= New England Amateur =

Golf tournament

Tournament information
- Location: Laconia, New Hampshire
- Established: 1926
- Course: Laconia Country Club
- Format: Stroke play (1971–); Match play (1926–1970)

Current champion
- C.J. Winchenbaugh

The New England Amateur is an American amateur golf tournament. In its very early years, the tournament did not garner much attention due to inadequate fields and poor play. However, the fifth edition, held in 1930 at Portland Country Club in Maine, was a watershed moment due to the tight competition and excellent tournament administration. In the mid-20th century, the tournament advanced on this success, regularly being hosted by the top clubs in New England, like Worcester Country Club and The Country Club, while annually boasting a competitive field. In the 1970s, the character of the tournament changed significantly as organizers modified the format, transforming it to a stroke play event, while the top players were primarily young, college students. Student-athletes like Bill Mallon, Brad Faxon, and Billy Andrade won during the late 20th century.

== History ==
=== Early editions: struggle and growth ===
In early 1926, it was announced by The Springfield Daily Republican that the state of Rhode Island had been selected to host the inaugural New England Amateur. The first tournament would be held at Rhode Island Country Club. The New England Amateur would commence with a two-round medal play qualifier; the tournament proper would be played in the match play format. The event was sanctioned by the New England Golf Association (NEGA). Organizers decided to rotate the tournament, playing in a different state in New England each year. The state of Vermont was not immediately included in the rotation, however. The state lacked a golf association and organizers feared, due to Vermont's relatively obscure location, that an insufficient amount of players would commit. By the late 1930s, however, Vermont was added to the rotation.

The very early years of the tournament were known for mediocre fields and mistake-prone golf. According to The Springfield Daily Republican, "In its early years the New England didn't attract general attention." This was true at the inaugural event, held in 1926. The Boston Globe noted, "There was a good deal of disappointment because some of the prominent golfers failed to put in an appearance," including Francis Ouimet, the best golfer in the region. The top draw was Jesse Guilford, former U.S. Amateur champion. Guilford, however, did not play well at the preliminary rounds. According to the Globe he "qualified well up in the list, scoring 160," which included an opening 82. In general, the quality of play at the qualifier was seen to be poor. "Outside of the first five players," the Globe continued, "the golf displayed by the field was not of championship caliber." At the tournament proper, Guilford's play did not improve. In the third round, he faced Frank Newton. Though "rated as one of the best putters in the country" Guilford gave "a weird exhibition on the putting green," putting poorly. He hit his drives erratically as well. He lost to Newton, who was 55-years-old, in extra holes. Newton reached the finals where he played the medalist, Ed Stimpson. Stimpson had an 18-inch putt on the 36th hole to win but missed. Newton won the match in extra holes. The tournaments immediately following were not perceived to be much better. The second tournament was played at Worcester Country Club. In the qualifier, according to the Associated Press, "Most of the field... experienced trouble" and "[h]igh [s]cores" were common. Even Fred Wright, the recent Massachusetts Amateur champion, opened with a "mediocre" 79 at the qualifier. In the tournament proper, however, Wright had much success and reached the finals where he faced W.A. Whitcomb. Similar to Stimpson's mistake the previous year, Whitcomb had a two-foot putt on the 36th hole to force extra holes but missed. Wright earned the championship. The tournament continued to get inadequate fields. At the following year's event Wright elected to not defend his championship. The next season, in 1929, most of the "stand-out golfers from the Boston district" decided not to play, including Ouimet, electing to play in the Massachusetts Amateur, also held in late July. In addition, top draws like Wright and Guilford chose not to compete citing business commitments.

However, the 1930 event, marked a turning point in the history of the tournament. Even in the late 1920s, there was some signs of progress. According to Springfield Daily Republican, the third edition of the event was seen as one of the challenging "warm-ups" for the 1928 U.S. Amateur, also held in New England. The Hartford Courant referred to the following year's event, held in 1929, as the "best" tournament the state of Connecticut would host throughout the season. However, the fifth edition of the tournament, held at Portland Country Club in Falmouth, Maine, marked a sea change in the significance of the New England Amateur. The Boston Globe opined that "the tournament is rapidly reaching a place in the forefront of amateur golf in New England." The Hartford Courant noted the 1930 New England Amateur possessed "one of the best balanced fields in the history of the event." A hitherto unknown teenager from Greenwich, Connecticut named Dick Chapman stole the show. In the first round, Chapman upset defending champion Paul Haviland. In the quarterfinals, Chapman easily defeated medalist Emery Stratton, 5 and 3, receiving much attention for breaking the course record in the process. In the semifinals, he defeated Charles Clare, one of the favorites, in an "effortless manner," 5 and 4. Elmer Ward of Massachusetts narrowly defeated him in the finals, however. According to "enthusiastic consensus" the event was "the most successful in the history of the New England Golf Association." The legendary tournament director Fred Corcoran "declared without equivocation that everything was perfect about the local arrangements." The politician and regional "sports authority" William Garcelon stated after the event to organizers: "You have put the New England [Golf] Association on the map. Congratulations to you and the Maine hosts on the success of the tournament."

Despite the loss, Chapman's good performance precipitated Connecticut dominance of the tournament in the ensuing years. In 1932, a "fairly amazing" scenario manifested itself as only Connecticut golfers reached the semifinals: Bobby Grant, Frank Ross, Dow Ahern, and Charles Clare. Grant defeated Ahern in the finals. According to sportswriter Bill Lee, the achievement was an important step for Connecticut golf, noting in a retrospective article for the Hartford Courant: "That was a New England first that put some of the Massachusetts feats of Francis Ouimet, Jess Guilford, and Fred Wright in the shade for a while." In 1933, for the second successive year, it was "an all-Connecticut semifinal." Clare, Grant, and Ross as well as newcomer Dom Soccoli all won their quarterfinals matches. Ross defeated Clare, 4 and 3, in the finals. In the words of W.A. Whitcomb, The Boston Globe golf writer, the tournament was starting "to resemble a Connecticut sweepstakes." The following year's event was held in Connecticut at the Country Club of Waterbury. At the qualifier, Clare earned medalist honors. Clare reached the finals where he earned a "decisive" 7 and 6 win over Charley Round. It was the "third successive year" that the title went to a Connecticut golfer. The following year, in 1935, the Hartford Courant predicted that there could be "a break in the domination of Connecticut golfers" due to a new format and challenges from top golfers from other states. Connecticut, indeed, "suffered astonishing reverses" of fortunate; of the dozens of Connecticut players that entered the event only three remained after the 4th round. As the semifinals approached the only Connecticut golfer that remained was unknown Holly Mandly, Jr. Mandly went on to win the tournament, though, assuring "the fourth successive year that a Connecticut man has won the New England crown." The following year, in 1936, it looked as if another Connecticut champion was imminent as three of the four semifinalists were from the state. However, Johnny Levinson, a summer resident of Maine, won the event.

=== World War II interregnum and afterwards ===
In the 1940s, the event was severely effected by World War II. At the 1940 tournament, held at Manchester Country Club in Manchester, New Hampshire, the tournament was colored by the likelihood of conscription. According to Bill Lee, a sportswriter for the Hartford Courant, "Most of the players in this tournament are in the age group that would be called first if the draft bill goes through. They've been talking about that almost as much as the golf that is played." Leo J. Martin of Weston, Massachusetts was victorious, defeating Tommy Leonard in the finals, 6 and 4. In early 1942, a couple months after the United States entered the war, the New England Golf Association (NEGA) decided to suspend the tournament. The United States Golf Association (USGA) had recently suspended their championships and the NEGA was following their precedent. According to Raynor Gardiner, the Secretary of the NEGA, "With so many of New England's outstanding golfers in the Army and Navy, it certainly would be an empty honor for the winner if we held our championship next summer." Indeed, many golfers who regularly played the tournament entered the service. Bobby Knowles joined the army. Dow Ahern, the 1932 runner-up, joined the navy. In addition, Leo J. Martin, the 1940 champion, joined the navy and his twin brother, Eddie Martin, joined the army. Leo was stationed in Europe and Eddie in North Africa. Ahern survived but was in veterans' hospitals for much of the remainder of his life. Knowles returned safely and had a number of top performances in the event in the 1950s. Among the Martin twins, Leo did not return, dying in a strange incident in the North Atlantic, though Eddie survived. Eddie would also have a number of top performances in the event in the 1950s.

The tournament resumed in 1946 and managed to preserve its prestige with top fields. During the decade, according to Donald B. Bagg of the Springfield Daily Republican, "The New England amateur tournament draws a stronger field every year than any other golf event in this corner of the country." Despite the gap between events it was largely the same collection of golfers who did well, including a number of surviving veterans, though a few newcomers played well. The most recent champion, Ted Bishop, was successful again, "trouncing" Ernie Gerardi in the finals, 7 and 5. The following year, Johnny Levinson, the 1936 and 1937 champion, won for the third time, defeating Ernie Doherty 4 and 3 in the finals. He was the first three-time champion. The following year, in 1948, Robert Walsh defeated Tommy Leonard, the 1940 runner-up, 3 and 1 in the finals. In 1949, Bobby Knowles, a World War II veteran, reached the semifinals but was defeated by Ernie Gerardi. Gerardi went on to win the tournament 8 and 7. However, Knowles reached the finals the following year, facing another World War II veteran, Eddie Martin. Knowles "holed a thrilling 45-foot putt on the 36th green" to defeat Martin, 1 up. In 1951, Dick Chapman, the 1930 runner-up, won for the tournament for the first time, defeating Dr. Ray Lebel, a dentist from Maine, 8 and 6.

In the 1950s the tournament belonged to Bob Kosten, a newly transplanted professional from Grand Rapids, Michigan who recently moved to Rhode Island. In 1952, Kosten became the first Rhode Islander to win the tournament, defeating Johnny Mandly 6 and 4 at Agawam Hunt Club. The following year, he successfully defended his championship, defeating Jim Jerome 6 and 4. It was Kosten's 20th consecutive individual match play victory, including two recent Rhode Island Amateur triumphs. He was only the second player to successfully defend his championship after Johnny Levinson in the 1930s. The following year, however, Kosten reached the finals but lost, falling to Bobby Grant. It was Grant's second win, his first since 1932. Kosten did not enter the following year. However, he returned to play the next tournament, in 1956, where he reached the finals, losing to Art Butler. Butler became the first golfer representing New Hampshire to win. The following year's event was at Rhode Island Country Club in Barrington, Rhode Island. In the semifinals, Kosten defeated Eddie Martin in extra holes to reach the finals for the fifth straight time. He played Bobby Allen in the finals. Things did not look good down the stretch for Kosten as he was 3 down with three holes left. However, he won the final holes of regulation to force extra holes. Kosten then holed a 15-foot birdie putt on the 38th hole to win. It was his third win in the event matching another record of Levinson's.

In ensuing years, a number of older players had success in the tournament. In 1960, 40-year-old Warren Tibbetts defeated Dick Siderowf, a recent graduate of Duke University, 2 and 1 in the finals. Three years later, at the age of 43, Tibbetts would again have much success. He was one of the oldest players to qualify; and by the second round he was the oldest player left. Tibbetts reached the finals and faced Eddie Barry, a former Boston Bruins hockey player. Tibbetts defeated him 4 and 3. The following year's event was held at Portland Country Club in Falmouth, Maine, site of the breakthrough 1930 tournament where teenager Dick Chapman reached the finals. The now 53-year-old Chapman once again made the headlines, defeating a number of younger players to earn rights to play for the championship. In the finals, he faced 22-year-old Ron "Red" Smith. Chapman had the lead during the afternoon round but squandered it, making several bogeys late. Smith won 4 and 3. In 1966, 44-year-old Dr. Ted Lenczyk, a Connecticut dentist, reached the semifinals. The following year, Lenczyk again reached the semifinals again but lost to Eddie Barry, the 1963 runner-up, 3 and 2. In the finals, Barry, now 48, defeated a "young Jimmy Grant" 3 and 2. He became "the oldest ever to win" the tournament. The following year, in 1968, Dr. Lenczyk reached the semifinals again. However, it was 46-year-old lawyer Peter Zaccagino that was ultimately victorious, defeating 20-year-old Lee Burke in the finals, 1 up.

=== Modern times: college stars dominate ===
In the 1970s, however, the character of the players changed significantly, as younger, college students now dominated. In 1971, in the first year of a new medal play format, veteran Frederick Kask built a seven-stroke lead over Bill Mallon, a student at Duke University, in the final round. Mallon made a "late charge" but it was not enough; Kask defeated Mallon, the solo runner-up, by three. In 1972, however, Mallon, now the captain of the Duke team, returned with a victory in the New England Amateur. The following year, 18-year-old Bobby Caprera, also a student at Duke, won the event. He was the youngest player ever to win the tournament. In general, according to The Boston Globe, the 1973 tournament "the leader board was dominated by young players," with the top six all between 18 and 22 years of age. The following year, in 1974, Murray State University student Bruce Douglass took a four-stroke lead at the midway lead. However, Douglass faltered late and Capera, now 19-years-old, won again. He was the first back-to-back champion since Bob Kosten in the early 1950s. Bill Lee, a middle-aged contestant, explained the success of the young golfers to the Globe: "The college kids come here with their games honed... The rest of us are just trying to reach mid-season form." The following year, in 1975, Mallon took a two-stroke lead over Douglass at the midway point. Despite a "late charge" from Douglass it was Mallon that secured the win. In 1977, University of Houston junior Kirk Hanefeld was victorious, defeating John Maloney and a member of the Yale University's golf team, Peter Teravainen, by four strokes.

In the 1980s, the tournament arguably reached its apogee as "a Who's Who of winners" regularly won. The 1980 tournament was held at Rhode Island Country Club. Future PGA Tour star Brad Faxon, playing on his home course, birdied the final hole to defeat Cutts Benedict by a shot. He was the first Rhode Islander to win in nearly twenty years. The following year, Faxon, now 19-years-old, was one of the "pre-tournament favorites." However, he opened with a four-over-par 74 and failed to break par in the second round. In the final day, though, Faxon shot rounds of 68 and 66 to win easily. His performance over the final two rounds earned comparisons to Jack Nicklaus. He was only the fourth player to successfully repeat in the history of the event. However, Faxon "elected not to defend" his championship the following year. Jim Hallet, another future PGA Tour pro, won. The following year, Hallett, feeling "burned out" from playing too much golf in the summer, missed the cut. In addition, once again Faxon did not play, having recently turned professional. Wake Forest sophomore Billy Andrade took advantage of this vacuum at the top, winning by nine strokes. Three years later, in 1986, Tim Petrovic, a University of Hartford golfer, won by one stroke. "I finally broke through," he told The Boston Globe. "I finally won a big tournament. I still can't believe I won." During the era, the New England Amateur was referred to as "the most prestigious amateur tournament in the region."

At the cusp of the century there continued to be some notable events. In 1989, Shawn Baker "became the first Vermonter ever to win the New England Amateur Golf Championship" defeating Rodney Butcher and Hans Albertsson, also of Vermont, by six. "I made a lot of mistakes in my first N.E. Tournament, but it will not be my last," Albertsson said after the tournament. "I will be back next year." Albertsson indeed contented the following year, playing "what he called the best golf of his life." He won, defeating Baker, the solo runner-up, by two strokes. In 1995, 17-year-old James Driscoll closed with rounds of 68 (−4) and 66 (−6) to win by a "whopping" 13 strokes. Five years later, Jim Salinetti, a former champ, matched Driscoll's margin of victory, recording a thirteen-stroke win at Waterville Country Club. In 2002, Kevin Quinn, was ten shots behind Rob Oppenheim entering the final day. However, he played well in the two-round finale while Oppenheim self-destructed; Quinn won. His victory was almost 36 years to day that his father, Fran Quinn Sr., won the event. Mike Welch won a "rain-shortened" event the next year, defeating a trio of golfers by six strokes at Salem Country Club. The following year, in 2004, Quinn opened with rounds of 64 and 67, "[m]oving into position for his second victory in three years in the event." He held a three-stroke lead over Bret Stegmaier, in second, and five stroke lead over Welch, in joint third. However, Quinn failed to match par in each round of the 36-hole finale while Welch closed with a 67, the round of the day, to defeat Quinn and Stegmaier by one. Welch became the first back-to-back winner since Brad Faxon. "That's some pretty elite company right there," Welch said after his victory. In 2008, Matt Broome, the leader after two rounds, was declared the champion at the midway point of the tournament; rain made the final two rounds impossible to play. Broome "directed credit" to Faxon after his victory. "Brad's been a great friend and a huge influence," he said.

In contemporary times, the length of the event has changed a number of times. In 2013, the tournament organizers pursued an "experiment" and shortened the New England Amateur to 54 holes. Many of the recent tournaments had been limited due to excessive rain. In addition, organizers felt the truncated tournament would accommodate out-of-state players and older players who were often worn out by the full, two-round finale. Now the 36-hole final day would be reduced to one, 18-hole final round. However, the following year, in 2014, the length of the tournament returned to 72 holes. Despite the reversion, the tournament was abruptly shortened to 54 holes in ensuing years. In 2018, rain interrupted the second round and the tournament was reduced to 54 holes. In 2020, the final round was cancelled due to rain. Shortly thereafter, the tournament largely reverted to a 54-hole format.

== Winners ==
Year	Winner	Score	To par	Margin of victory	Runner-up	Venue	Location	Ref.
2024	C.J. Winchenbaugh	205	−11	Playoff (Note: Winchenbaugh defeated Broderick with a birdie on the first hole of a sudden-death playoff.)	John Broderick	Laconia Country Club	Laconia, New Hampshire	
2023	Joey Lenane	281	−7	2 strokes	John Broderick	The Woodlands Club	Falmouth, Maine	
2022	Jared Nelson	208	−8	1 stroke	Bryson Richards; Christian Emmerich; Joseph Harney	Alpine Country Club	Cranston, Rhode Island	
2021	Cody Paladino	206	−10	1 stroke	Caleb Manuel	Great River Golf Club	Milford, Connecticut	
2020	John Broderick	206 (Note: Final round cancelled due to rain.)	−4	Playoff (Note: Broderick defeated Maccario with a birdie on the second hole of a sudden-death playoff.)	Nick Maccario	Concord Country Club	Concord, Massachusetts	
2019	Xavier Marcoux	279	−9	1 stroke	Bobby Leopold	The Quechee Club	Quechee, Vermont	
2018	Reese McFarlane	206 (Note: Play suspended during first round due to "unplayable" conditions. Event ultimately reduced from 72 to 54 holes.)	−4	2 strokes	Drake Hull	Portland Country Club	Falmouth, Maine	
2017	Bobby Leopold	277	−3	1 stroke	Billy Walthouse; Kevin Silva	Metacomet Country Club	East Providence, Rhode Island	
2016	James Turner	273	−7	5 strokes	Zach Zaback; Geoff Vartelas; Matt Paradis; Ryan Tombs; Bobby Leopold	The Hartford Golf Club	West Hartford, Connecticut	
2015	Nick McLaughlin	281	−7	1 stroke	Ben Balter	Baker Hill Golf Club	Newbury, New Hampshire	
2014	John VanDerLaan	278	−6	3 strokes	Nicholas Pandelena	Winchester Country Club	Winchester, Massachusetts	
2013	Evan Russell	208	−6	1 stroke	Brad Valois	Green Mountain National Golf Club	Killington, Vermont	
2012	Christopher Swift	282	−2	5 strokes	Garren Poirier; Jake Nutter; Herbie Aikens	Falmouth Country Club	Falmouth, Maine	
2011	Jeff Hedden	267	−13	6 strokes	Richy Werenski	Metacomet Country Club	East Providence, Rhode Island	
2010	Brian Higgins	204	−6	1 stroke	Mike Ballo, Jr. Colin Brennan; Joshua Briere	Yale Golf Course	New Haven, Connecticut	
2009	Matt Parziale	283	−5	3 strokes	Garrett Medeiros	Portsmouth Country Club	Greenland, New Hampshire	
2008	Matt Broome	137 (Note: Second round suspended due to darkness. Final round cancelled due to rain.)	−3	1 stroke	Charles McAndrew	Charles River Country Club	Newton, Massachusetts	
2007	Brent Paladino	136 (Note: Final two rounds cancelled due to rain.)	−8	2 strokes	Frank Vana, Jr.	Quechee Club	Quechee, Vermont	
2006	Brad Valois	287	−1	2 strokes	Kevin Velardo	The Woodlands	Falmouth, Maine	
2005	Jim Renner	278	−6	Playoff (Note: Renner defeated Drohen on the first hole of a sudden-death playoff.)	Andy Drohen	Valley Country Club	Warwick, Rhode Island	
2004	Mike Welch (2)	274	−6	1 stroke	Kevin Quinn; Brett Stegmaier	Race Brook Country Club	Orange, Connecticut	
2003	Mike Welch	204 (Note: Due to a number of rain delays during the first day and forecasts for poor weather later the third and fourth rounds were cancelled.)	−6	6 strokes	Charlie Blanchard; Kevin Silva; Billy Auger	Salem Country Club	Peabody, Massachusetts	
2002	Kevin Quinn	281	+1	1 stroke	Matthew Torrance; Dany Arvanitis	Manchester Country Club	Bedford, New Hampshire	
2001	Craig Steckowych	280	−8	1 stroke	Rob Oppenheim	Quechee Club	Quechee, Vermont	
2000	Jim Salinetti (2)	271	−9	13 strokes	Mark Plummer	Waterville Country Club	Oakland, Maine	
1999	Joey Pohle	284	+4	1 stroke	Ned Yetten, Jr.	Potowomut Golf Club	East Greenwich, Rhode Island	
1998	J. J. Henry	276	−4	2 strokes	Larry Nuger	New Haven Country Club	Hamden, Connecticut	
1997	Jim Salinetti	275	−9	5 strokes	Phil Pleat	Portsmouth Country Club	Greenland, New Hampshire	
1996	John Curley	283	+3	2 strokes	James Driscoll	Charles River Country Club	Newton, Massachusetts	
1995	James Driscoll	274	−14	13 strokes	John Curley	Quechee Club	Quechee, Vermont	
1994	Mark Plummer (2)	290	+6	2 strokes	Jason Caron	Falmouth Country Club	Falmouth, Maine	
1993	Bill Hadden (2)	280	E	6 strokes	Ted Rockwell, Jr.	Oak Hill Country Club	Fitchburg, Massachusetts	
1992	John Veneziano	293	+7	1 stroke	Louis O'Keefe	Warwick Country Club	Warwick, Rhode Island	
1991	Sean Gorgone	286	−2	7 strokes	Rodney Butcher	Sky Meadow Country Club	Nashua, New Hampshire	
1990	Hans Albertson	275	−9	2 strokes	Shawn Baker	Woodbridge Country Club	Woodbridge, Connecticut	
1989	Shawn Baker	279	−1	6 strokes	Hans Albertsson; Rodney Butcher	Rutland Country Club	Rutland, Vermont	
1988	Bill Hadden	279	−1	1 stroke	Jim Ruschioni	Portland Country Club	Falmouth, Maine	
1987	Jim Ruschioni	280	−4	4 strokes	Bill Haden	Oak Hill Country Club	Fitchburg, Massachusetts	
1986	Tim Petrovic	287	+7	1 stroke	Lucas Sirois	Potowomut Golf Club	East Greenwich, Rhode Island	
1985	Bruce Chalas	291	+11	5 strokes	Bob Mielcarz; John Parsons	Concord Country Club	Concord, New Hampshire	
1984	Mark Hollfelder	221 (Note: Rain ultimately cancelled one of the rounds.)	+5	Playoff (Note: Hollfelder defeated Siderowf with a par on the second hole of a sudden-death playoff.)	Dick Siderowf	Brooklawn Country Club	Fairfield, Connecticut	
1983	Billy Andrade	274	−10	9 strokes	Bill Hadden	Crown Point Country Club	Springfield, Vermont	
1982	Jim Hallet	213 (Note: First round was "rained out." Tournament reduced to 54 holes.)	E	2 strokes	John Ruby	Belmont Country Club	Belmont, Massachusetts	
1981	Brad Faxon (2)	278	−2	5 strokes	Kevin Klier	York Golf and Tennis Club	York, Maine	
1980	Brad Faxon	287	+3	1 stroke	Cutts Benedict	Rhode Island Country Club	Barrington, Rhode Island	
1979	Mark Plummer	289	+1	2 strokes	Bill Lee	Portsmouth Country Club	Greenland, New Hampshire	
1978	Steve Robbins	283	−1	5 strokes	Cutts Benedict	The Hartford Golf Club	West Hartford, Connecticut	
1977	Kirk Hanefeld	285	−3	4 strokes	John Maloney; Peter Teravainen	Quechee Club	Quechee, Vermont	
1976	Dave Lane	287	+3	2 strokes	Dana Saad	Portland Country Club	Falmouth, Maine	
1975	Bill Mallon (2)	286	−2	5 strokes	Bruce Douglass	Vesper Country Club	Tyngsborough, Massachusetts	
1974	Bob Caprera (2)	284	+4	1 stroke	Kevin Morris	Metacomet Country Club	East Providence, Rhode Island	
1973	Bob Caprera	292	+4	Playoff (Note: Mallon defeated Nash with a par on the second hole of a sudden-death playoff.)	Dave Nash	Portsmouth Country Club	Greenland, New Hampshire	
1972	Bill Mallon	289	+9	2 strokes	Duane Haley	Yale Golf Course	New Haven, Connecticut	
1971	Frederick Kask	280	E	3 strokes	Bill Mallon	Rutland Country Club	Rutland, Vermont	
Format change from match play to stroke play								
1970	John Ruby			2 & 1	Joe Browning	Augusta Country Club	Manchester, Maine	
1969	John Sale			7 & 6	Harry Cain	Nashawtuc Country Club	Concord, Massachusetts	
1968	Peter Zaccagnino			1 up	Lee Burke	Pawtucket Country Club	Pawtucket, Rhode Island	
1967	Eddie Barry			3 & 2	Jimmy Grant	Nashua Country Club	Nashua, New Hampshire	
1966	Fran Quinn, Sr.			5 & 4	Ken Corcoran, Jr.	Ellington Ridge Country Club	Ellington, Connecticut	
1965	Jimmy Grant			8 & 6	Joe Browning	Equinox Club	Manchester, Vermont	
1964	Ron "Red" Smith, Jr.			4 & 3	Dick Chapman	Portland Country Club	Falmouth, Maine	
1963	Warren Tibbetts (2)			4 & 3	Eddie Barry	Brae Burn Country Club	Newton, Massachusetts	
1962	Ron Quinn			6 & 5	Steve Robbins	Warwick Country Club	Warwick, Rhode Island	
1961	Dick Siderowf			8 & 7	Bobby Allen	Manchester Country Club	Bedford, New Hampshire	
1960	Warren Tibbetts			2 & 1	Dick Siderowf	Wampanoag Country Club	West Hartford, Connecticut	
1959	Dan Hoenig			10 & 9	Pat Mazzerella	Rutland Country Club	Rutland, Vermont	
1958	Bobby Allen			38 holes	Dick Diversi	Oak Hill Country Club	Fitchburg, Massachusetts	
1957	Bob Kosten (3)			1 up	Bobby Allen	Rhode Island Country Club	Barrington, Rhode Island	
1956	Art Butler			4 & 3	Bob Kosten	Penobscot Valley Country Club	Orono, Maine	
1955	Dave Sullivan			2 & 1	Al Faenza	Manchester Country Club	Bedford, New Hampshire	
1954	Robert M. Grant (2)			6 & 5	Bob Kosten	Brooklawn Country Club	Fairfield, Connecticut	
1953	Bob Kosten (2)			6 & 5	Jim Jerome	Ekwanok Country Club	Manchester, Vermont	
1952	Bob Kosten			6 & 4	Johnny Mandly	Agawam Hunt Club	Rumford, Rhode Island	
1951	Dick Chapman			8 & 6	Dr. Ray Lebel	The Country Club	Brookline, Massachusetts	
1950	Bobby Knowles			1 up	Eddie Martin	Nashua Country Club	Nashua, New Hampshire	
1949	Ernie Gerardi			8 & 7	Johnny Mandly	Portland Country Club	Falmouth, Maine	
1948	Robert Walsh			3 & 1	Tommy Leonard	Country Club of Waterbury	Waterbury, Connecticut	
1947	Johnny Levinson (3)			4 & 3	Ernie Doherty	Rhode Island Country Club	Barrington, Rhode Island	
1946	Ted Bishop (2)			7 & 5	Ernie Gerardi	Brae Burn Country Club	Newton, Massachusetts	
1942–1945: Not held due to World War II								
1941	Ted Bishop			3 & 2	Holly Mandly, Jr.	New Haven Country Club	Hamden, Connecticut	
1940	Leo J. Martin			6 & 4	Tommy Leonard	Manchester Country Club	Bedford, New Hampshire	
1939	Holly Mandly, Jr. (2)			1 up	Wilfred Crossley	Wannamoisett Country Club	Rumford, Rhode Island	
1938	Wilfred Crossley			7 & 5	Mel Merritt	The Country Club	Brookline, Massachusetts	
1937	Johnny Levinson (2)			2 & 1	Eddie Lowery	Ekwanok Country Club	Manchester, Vermont	
1936	Johnny Levinson			3 & 2	Spencer Brainard	Portland Country Club	Falmouth, Maine	
1935	Holly Mandly, Jr.			6 & 5	Wilfred Crossley	Worcester Country Club	Worcester, Massachusetts	
1934	Charles Clare			7 & 6	Charley Round	Country Club of Waterbury	Waterbury, Connecticut	
1933	Frank Ross			4 & 3	Charles Clare	Manchester Country Club	Bedford, New Hampshire	
1932	Robert M. Grant			7 & 6	Dow Ahern	Rhode Island Country Club	Barrington, Rhode Island	
1931	Joseph M. Batchelder			9 & 7	Jimmy Dolan	The Country Club	Brookline, Massachusetts	
1930	Elmer Ward			3 & 1	Dick Chapman	Portland Country Club	Falmouth, Maine	
1929	Paul Haviland			2 up	Brad Oxnard	Hartford Golf Club	West Hartford, Connecticut	
1928	Bill Blaney			4 & 2	P.F. Crosby	Nashua Country Club	Nashua, New Hampshire	
1927	Fred Wright, Jr.			1 up	W.A. "Billy" Whitcomb	Worcester Country Club	Worcester, Massachusetts	
1926	Frank Newton			39 holes	Edward Stimpson	Rhode Island Country Club	Barrington, Rhode Island	
