= Connecticut Open (golf) =

American golf tournament

The Connecticut Open is the Connecticut state open golf tournament, open to both amateur and professional golfers. It is organized by the Connecticut State Golf Association. It has been played annually since 1931 (except for war years) at a variety of courses around the state. It was considered a PGA Tour event in the 1930s.

== History ==
In 1915 and 1916 there was a significant golf event entitled the Connecticut Open. The English golfer Jim Barnes won it both years. In the 1920s, there was talk of renewing the event. In 1930, an event entitled the Connecticut Open was scheduled to be hosted on September 13 and 14. The event was scheduled to be held at Shenecossett Club. However, it failed to receive "sanction" from the Connecticut Golf Association. The event was canceled by September 3. It was also reported during late 1930 that the Connecticut Golf Association was planning on sanctioning an official state open in the summer of 1931.

The first Connecticut Open sanctioned by the Connecticut Golf Association was held in 1931. Eighty players entered in the first tournament. The event was two rounds long and played over one day at Yale Golf Course. Playing against "a light rain" and "a strong, chilly wind," as reported by The New York Times, Henry Ciuci managed to score 152 to win. He defeated Jack Ryan, the assistant professional at Yale GC, by two shots. A number of players finished one shot further back to tie for third, including amateur Charles Clare. As low amateur, he earned a silver plate. Ciuci won $250 and the right to hold a Connecticut Golf Association shield for a year. For most of the early years of the Connecticut Open, however, it was the professional Johnny Golden that dominated. Golden won four consecutive tournaments from 1932 through 1935. However, in January 1936 he abruptly died of pneumonia. Later in the year, Leo Mallory, Golden's former assistant at Wee Burn, won the Connecticut Open with 283 total. It was the lowest total since the tournament switched from a two-round tournament to a four-round tournament. The following year, at Wampanoag Country Club, he won by 10 shots, another tournament record. In 1941, Jimmy Demaret, who won the Masters the previous year, won the Connecticut Open. The tournament was not held until 1946 due to World War II.

Former PGA Tour pro Mike Colandro won the event in 1986. Despite his win, he advocated some changes to the tournament. According to the Hartford Courant, shortly after his victory "he called for the sponsoring Connecticut State Golf Association to open the event to all state pros, get a sponsor and increase the $10,000 purse."

In 1997, PGA Tour player Ken Green played the event. Many were surprised to see a current PGA Tour player in the field. He explained, "I don't really want to be here, but I don't have any choice. I have a negative net worth."

== Winners ==
Year	Champion(s)	Venue	Score	Ref.
2026	Bradley Sawka (a)	Country Club of Fairfield	196	
2025	Mike Ballo Jr.	Black Hall Club	202	
2024	Jackson Roman (a)	Shorehaven Golf Club	201	
2023	Brett Stegmaier	Shuttle Meadow Country Club	198	
2022	Peter Ballo	New Haven Country Club	203	
2021	Peter Ballo	Country Club of Darien	201	
2020	Max Theodorakis	Ridgewood Country Club	206	
2019	Rasmey Kong	Torrington Country Club	202	
2018	John VanDerLaan	New Haven Country Club	194	
2017	Jeffrey Evanier	Ellington Ridge Country Club	205	
2016	Adam Rainaud	Woodway Country Club	206	
2015	Cody Paladino	Patterson Club	207	
2014	Frank Bensel	Rolling Hills Country Club	203	
2013	Jeff Curl	Torrington Country Club	209	
2012	Jason Caron	Wee Burn Country Club	214	
2011	Frank Bensel	Brooklawn Country Club	205	
2010	Kyle Gallo	Country Club of Fairfield	200	
2009	Frank Bensel	Hartford Golf Club	204	
2008	Jeff Hedden (a)	Round Hill Club	206	
2007	Jeff Curl	Lake of Isles	208	
2006	Nick Cook	Ridgewood Country Club	211	
2005	Nick Cook	Country Club of Waterbury	206	
2004	Kyle Gallo	Mill River Country Club	203	
2003	Steve Sokol	Black Hall Club	209	
2002	Jim St. Pierre	New Haven Country Club	203	
2001	John Paesani	Golf Club of Avon	207	
2000	Kyle Gallo	Country Club of Fairfield	209	
1999	Jay Rice (a)	Wee Burn Country Club	213	
1998	Kyle Gallo	Ellington Ridge Country Club	214	
1997	Michael Gilmore	Race Brook Country Club	204	
1996	Brendan Walsh	Patterson Club	208	
1995	John A. Gentile	Woodway Country Club	209	
1994	Kevin Giancola	Wethersfield Country Club	207	
1993	Michael Gilmore	Stanwich Club	216	
1992	Ken Green	Ridgewood Country Club	200	
1991	Mike Colandro	Brooklawn Country Club	207	
1990	Michael Downey	Wee Burn Country Club	218	
1989	John David Parsons	Golf Club of Avon	213	
1988	Kevin Giancola	Woodbridge Country Club	204	
1987	Kevin Giancola (a)	Tamarack Country Club	211	
1986	Mike Colandro	Hartford Golf Club	215	
1985	Ken Green	New Haven Country Club	209	
1984	Jack McConachie	Tumble Brook Country Club	214	
1983	Ed Sabo	Woodway Country Club	218	
1982	Ed Sabo	Wethersfield Country Club	205	
1981	Ed Sabo	Yale Golf Course	213	
1980	Doug Dalziel	Wampanoag Country Club	205	
1979	Doug Dalziel	Ellington Ridge Country Club	209	
1978	Mike Ballo	Golf Club of Avon	209	
1977	Bobby Benson	Race Brook Country Club	210	
1976	Jim Becker	Woodbridge Country Club	214	
1975	Jim Becker	Ellington Ridge Country Club	208	
1974	Austin Straub	Wee Burn Country Club	217	
1973	Dick Siderowf (a)	Brooklawn Country Club	213	
1972	Paul Kelly	Tamarack Country Club	211	
1971	Bobby Benson	Wethersfield Country Club	203	
1970	John Gentile Jr. (a)	Hartford Golf Club	212	
1969	Mike Ballo	New Haven Country Club	208	
1968	Denny Lyons	Wampanoag Country Club	209	
1967	Roy Pace Jr.	Golf Club of Avon	210	
1966	Roy Pace Jr.	Tumble Brook Country Club	216	
1965	Jerry Courville Sr.	Race Brook Country Club	207	
1964	Bob Kay	Woodway Country Club	211	
1963	John Cleary	Country Club of Farmington	212	
1962	Bob Cloughen	Torrington Country Club	207	
1961	Edward Kuna	Mill River Country Club	209	
1960	Allan Breed	Shennecossett Golf Course	211	
1959	Dick Siderowf (a)	Shorehaven Golf Club	214	
1958	Dick Siderowf (a)	Brooklawn Country Club	214	
1957	Don Hoenig	Golf Club of Avon	204	
1956	Don Hoenig	New Haven Country Club	214	
1955	John Galeski	Ridgewood Country Club	210	
1954	Ted Lenczyk	Shuttle Meadow Country Club	207	
1953	Les Brownlee (a)	Wee Burn Country Club	213	
1952	Joe Curtin	Hartford Golf Club	209	
1951	Harry Nettelbladt	Wethersfield Country Club	207	
1950	Harry Nettelbladt	Wampanoag Country Club	284	
1949	Frank Staszowski	New Haven Country Club	286	
1948	Frank Staszowski	Race Brook Country Club	277	
1947	Frank Strazza	Indian Hill Country Club	285	
1946	Felice Torza (a)	Torrington Country Club	293	
1942–45: No tournament due to World War II
1941	Jimmy Demaret	Race Brook Country Club	280	
1940	Harold H. Mandly Jr. (a)	Wampanoag Country Club	289	
1939	Harry Cooper	New Haven Country Club	279	
1938	Eddie Burke	Brooklawn Country Club	287	
1937	Leo Mallory	Wampanoag Country Club	284	
1936	Leo Mallory	Shuttle Meadow Country Club	283	
1935	Johnny Golden	Brooklawn Country Club	291	
1934	Johnny Golden	New Haven Country Club	286	
1933	Johnny Golden	Shuttle Meadow Country Club	291	
1932	Johnny Golden	Wampanoag Country Club	143	
1931	Henry Ciuci	Yale Golf Course	152	

== See also ==
- Connecticut Open (1910s event)
- New Haven Open
