= Connecticut Amateur =

American golf tournament

The Connecticut Amateur is the state amateur golf championship in Connecticut. First played in 1899, it is one of the oldest state amateur championships in the United States.

== History ==
The inaugural tournament was won by Thomas L. Cheney, a Yale University student and Yale Golf Team member. A decade later, the tournament was won in consecutive years by another member of Yale's golf team, Buck Merriman. In 1910, Merriman was the medalist at the event.

In modern times, the tournament usually begins with two qualifying rounds of stroke play. The medalist earns the R.M. Grant Medalist honors. The top 32 players then move on to the match play format of the tournament. The match play consists of two rounds each of the next two days. On the third and final day of match play, the remaining two players compete in a 36-hole final.

Reverend William T. Lee, pastor of the Emanuel Lutheran Church in New Haven, won the Connecticut Amateur three times from 1975 to 1990.

== Winners ==
Year	Champion	Venue	Ref.
2026	Will Lodge	Wampanoag	
2025	Adam Friedman	Shuttle Meadow	
2024	Austin Perkins	Torrington	
2023	Richard Dowling III	Darien	
2022	Ben Carpenter	Ridgewood	
2021	Chris Fosdick	Hartford	
2020	Chris Fosdick	Shorehaven	
2019	Richard Dowling III	Fox Hopyard	
2018	Ben Conroy	Waterbury	
2017	Richard Dowling III	Tashua Knolls	
2016	Zach Zaback	Wethersfield	
2015	Evan Grenus	Black Hall	
2014	Zach Zaback	Lake of Isles	
2013	Cody Paladino	New Haven	
2012	Matt Smith	Race Brook	
2011	Tommy McDonagh	Rolling Hills	
2010	Bernie D'Amato	Waterbury	
2009	R.J. Zielinski	Woodway	
2008	Will Strickler	Ellington Ridge	
2007	Will Strickler	Woodbridge	
2006	Tommy McDonagh	Torrington	
2005	Tim Kane	New Haven	
2004	Steve Velardi	Patterson	
2003	Justin Goodhue	Wampanoag	
2002	Jeff Hedden	Farmington	
2001	Mark Farrell	Brooklawn	
2000	Brian Hedstrom	Ridgewood	
1999	Brian Ahern	Waterbury	
1998	J. J. Henry	Wallingford	
1997	Brian Hedstrom	Darien	
1996	Kevin Gai	Farmington	
1995	J. J. Henry	Hop Meadow	
1994	J. J. Henry	Torrington	
1993	William L. Hadden III	Fairfield	
1992	Greg Karakashian	New Haven	
1991	Bill Hermanson	Patterson	
1990	William T. Lee	Hartford	
1989	Roger Everin	Tumble Brook	
1988	Tim Petrovic	Shuttle Meadow	
1987	Fred Kask	Wethersfield	
1986	John Ruby	Brooklawn	
1985	Dick Siderowf	Wee Burn	
1984	Dick Siderowf	Race Brook	
1983	Jonas Saxton	Waterbury	
1982	William L. Hadden III	Wampanoag	
1981	Jerry Courville Jr.	Ridgewood	
1980	Fred Kask	Shorehaven	
1979	William T. Lee	New Haven	
1978	David Szewczul	Brooklawn	
1977	Fred Kask	Wethersfield	
1976	Robert Zink	Tumble Brook	
1975	William T. Lee	Yale Golf Course	
1974	Richard Weigold	Waterbury	
1973	John Parsons	Wampanoag	
1972	Joe Dennis	Race Brook	
1971	William Brew	Woodway	
1970	Fred Kask	Shuttle Meadow	
1969	John A. Gentile	Hartford	
1968	Jerry Courville Sr.	Wee Burn	
1967	James Grant	Waterbury	
1966	Ron W. Smith Jr.	Brooklawn	
1965	Dick Siderowf	New Haven	
1964	Ron W. Smith Jr.	Wethersfield	
1963	Allan Breed	Wampanoag	
1962	Robert Allen	Waterbury	
1961	T. Lenczyk	Race Brook	
1960	Dick Siderowf	Shorehaven	
1959	Pat Mazzarella	Indian Hill	
1958	James T. Healey	Waterbury	
1957	Don Hoenig	New Haven	
1956	Alpheus Winter Jr.	Brooklawn	
1955	Dick Siderowf	Wampanoag	
1954	John Netcho	Yale Golf Course	
1953	Ernest Gerardi	Race Brook	
1952	Robert M. Grant	Shuttle Meadow	
1951	James T. Healey	Ridgewood	
1950	W. W. Markham	Brooklawn	
1949	Holly Mandly	Wethersfield	
1948	Alpheus Winter Jr.	Greenwich	
1947	Holly Mandly	Waterbury	
1946	Robert M. Grant	New Haven	
1943-45	No tournament due to World War II		
1942	Edward Wilkos	Waterbury	
1941	R. J. Walsh	Brooklawn	
1940	Holly Mandly Jr.	Shuttle Meadow	
1939	A. Kosinski	Wampanoag	
1938	Dick Chapman	Racebrook	
1937	A. Kosinski	Woodway	
1936	Dick Chapman	Greenwich	
1935	Charles Clare	Hartford	
1934	A. Kosinski	Brooklawn	
1933	Charles Clare	Waterbury	
1932	Robert M. Grant	Shuttle Meadow	
1931	Charles Clare	Wee Burn	
1930	Frank Ross	Wampanoag	
1929	Ken Reid	New Haven	
1928	P. Haviland	Woodway	
1927	F. K. English	Hartford	
1926	Frank Ross	Shennecossett	
1925	A. C. Giles	New Haven	
1924	Parker Seeley	Shuttle Meadow	
1923	H. J. Topping	Shennecossett	
1922	W. P. Seeley	Shennecossett	
1921	R. M. Lewis	Greenwich	
1920	Roger H. Hoovey	Brooklawn	
1919	Roger H. Hoovey	Shuttle Meadow	
1918	H. S. White	New Haven	
1917	No tournament due to World War I		
1916	R. M. Lewisy	Greenwich	
1915	H. K. Kerr	Brooklawn	
1914	W. P. Seeley	Hartford	
1913	R. Abbott	New Haven	
1912	C. G. Waldo Jr.	Hartford	
1911	C. G. Waldo Jr.	Hartford	
1910	Roger H. Hovey	New Haven	
1909	Buck Merriman	Greenwich	
1908	Buck Merriman	New Haven	
1907	W. K. Shepard	Hartford	
1906	R. D. Sanford	Wee Burn	
1905	W. K. Shepard	New Haven	
1904	S. H. Patterson	Hartford	
1903	Charles H. Seeley	New Haven	
1902	Charles H. Seeley	Hartford	
1901	Charles H. Seeley	New Haven	
1900	Carl E. Martin	Wee Burn	
1899	Thomas L. Cheney	Brooklawn	

== R.M. Grant Medalist ==
The R.M. Grant Medalist goes to the medalist of the qualifying rounds. It is named after the amateur golfer Robert M. Grant. Grant won the Connecticut Amateur three times in the mid-20th century.

Year	Medalist	Ref.
2022	Jack Woods	
2021	Bradford Tilley	
2020	Bradford Tilley	
2019	Chris Ayers	
2018	Evan Grenus	
2017	Nick Cook / Benjamin Day	
2016	Brian Ahern	
2015	John Flaherty	
2014	Sean Gaudette	
2013	Kevin Josephson	
2012	Brendan Lem	
2011	John Murphy	
2010	Jeff Hedden	
2009	Kevin Josephson	
2008	Philip Perry	
2007	Richard Jung	
2006	Cody Paladino / Pete Catanzaro	
2005	Chet Hrostek	
2004	Nick Cook	
2003	Justin Goodhue	
2002	Chris Maxwell	
2001	Kevin Henry	
2000	Tim Kane / Mark Farrell	
1999	Dave Szewczul	
1998	Paul Delucco	
1997	Steve Ligi	
1996	Joe Dennis	
1995	Kevin Gai	
1994	Jerry LaPlaca	
1993	Joe Dennis / George Zahringer	
1992	Joe Dennis	
1991	Fred Hyatt / Tom Yellin	
1990	John Bracken	
1989	Jerry LaPlaca	
1988	Andrew Brock	
1987	Joe Dennis	
1986	Dick Siderowf / William Hadden III	
1985	Dick Siderowf	
1984	Alan Helfer	
1983	Jon Saxton / Ron Henry Jr. / Ralph Salito Jr.	
1982	Roger Everin	
1981	James Saldamarco / Allan Breed	
1980	Brian Claar	
1979	Jeff Duncan	
1978	George Wilson Jr. / Richard Weigold	
1977	Fred Kask	
1976	Fred Kask	
1975	Paul Maloney	
1974	Edward Day Jr. / Richard Weigold	
1973	John Parsons	
1972	Dick Siderowf	
1971	Clem Miner / Fred Kask / P. J. Zaccagnino	
1970	Fred Kask	
1969	Jerry Courville	
1968	Jerry Courville	
1967	James Grant	
1966	Pat Mazzarella	
1965	Allen Breed / Dick Siderowf	
1964	Jerry Courville	
1963	Dick Siderowf	
1962	J. A. Grant	
1961	Jerry Courville	
1960	S. Petrone	
1959	C. E. Creed	
1958	J. T. Healey	
1957	D. Hoenig	
1956	A. Fuchs / T. N. Lenczyk	
1955	T. Lenczyk	
1954	A. Winter	
1953	H. L. Emanuelson Jr.	
1952	L. Lostoski	
1951	R. E. Tarrant (won playoff)	
1950	E. J. Gerardi	
1949	Julius Boros	
1948	Julius Boros	
1947	F. Torza (won playoff)	
1946	C. C. Clare	
1943-45	No tournament due to World War II	
1942	W. A. Hughes (won playoff)	
1941	W. Galla	
1940	A. Kosinski	
1939	C. C. Clare	
1938	R. M. Grant	
1937	A. Kosinski	
1936	R. M. Grant	
1935	S. Brainard	
1934	A.Kosinski	
1933	C. C. Clare	
1932	C. C. Clare (won in playoff)	
1931	Robert M Grant	
1930	Robert M Grant	
1929	Paul Haviland	
1928	F. Jarvis Jr.	
1927	R. M. Grant	
1926	W. K Reid	
1925	C. F. Stoddard	
1924	J Sill Jr.	
1923	Billy Burke	
1922	F.R English	
1921	Buck Merriman	
1920	R. H. Hovey	
1919	W. P. Seeley	
1918	F. K. English	
1917	No tournament due to World War I	
1916	W. P. Seeley	
1915	W. P. Seeley	
1914	Percy Rothwell	
1913	W. K. Shepard	
1912	Roger H. Hovey	
1911	Roger H. Hovey	
1910	Buck Merriman	
1909	Buck Merriman	
1908	Roger H. Hovey	
1907	W. A. Jackson	
1906	Roger H. Hovey	
1905	J. E. Sprott	
1904		
1903	J. E. Sprott	
