= Will Strickler =

American professional golfer (born 1986)

Personal information
- Full name: William Belden Strickler
- Nationality: United States
- Born: January 15, 1986 (age 40) Bronxville, New York, U.S.
- Height: 6 ft 5 in (1.96 m)
- Weight: 190 lb (86 kg; 14 st)
- Spouse: Jamie Strickler

Career
- Sport: Golf
- College: University of Florida
- Turned professional: 2009
- Current tours: Web.com Tour; PGA Tour Canada
- Former tour: PGA Tour

William Belden Strickler (born January 15, 1986) is an American professional golfer who has played on the PGA Tour, Web.com Tour and PGA Tour Canada.

== Early life ==
Strickler was born in Bronxville, New York. He is the son of Diana and Richard S. Strickler Jr. His father served as managing director for mergers and acquisitions of financial companies at Morgan Stanley in New York until his retirement in 1989.

Strickler grew up in Charlottesville, Virginia and Madison, Connecticut. Strickler was the MVP for the varsity tennis team at St. Anne's-Belfield School in Charlottesville as a freshman. He transferred to Woodberry Forest School in [Madison County, Virginia] beginning his sophomore year. Strickler found similar success on the golf course as the 2003 Virginia Prep League Individual Champion, and Strickler also led Woodberry Forest's golf team to the 2003 and 2004 Prep League Championships. Strickler served as the golf team's captain as a senior. His sister, Meggie, played lacrosse at Harvard University.

== Amateur career ==
Strickler received an athletic scholarship to attend the University of Florida in Gainesville, Florida, where he played for coach Buddy Alexander's Florida Gators men's golf team in National Collegiate Athletic Association (NCAA) competition in 2005 and from 2007 to 2009. During his career as a Gator golfer, he was a four-time letter winner and a senior team captain in 2008–2009. In tournament play, Strickler earned medalist honors at the 2009 Golden Ocala Collegiate, along with top 10 finishes at the 2009 Azalea Invitational, 2008 Monroe Invitational, 2008 Northeast Amateur, 2008 John Hayt Collegiate Invitational and 2008 New Year's Invitational.

Strickler graduated from the University of Florida with a bachelor's degree, in both anthropology and economics in 2009.

Strickler also won the Connecticut Amateur in both 2007 and 2008, becoming the first repeat winner since J. J. Henry in 1994 and 1995. He tied for second in stroke play qualifying at the 2009 U.S. Amateur, with a two-round total of 141 at Southern Hills Country Club in Tulsa, Oklahoma. He won one match before dropping his second round (round of 32) contest.

== Professional career ==
He turned professional shortly after the 2009 U.S. Amateur. He placed second at the Canadian Tour fall qualifying school in September, earning tour privileges for the 2010 season. He made 7 cuts in 10 tournaments on the Canadian Tour in 2010, with his best finish a fourth-place tie at the Desert Dunes Classic in November.

In December 2010, Strickler successfully gained a 2011 PGA Tour card through the qualifying school. Strickler entered the 6th and final round tied for 4th, but struggled, finishing with a last-hole bogey to make the cut on the number. Strickler's bogey on the 18th, plus Nationwide Tour graduates Michael Putnam and Justin Hicks placing in the top 25, allowed Scott Gordon and Billy Horschel (Strickler's friend and former Florida teammate) to earn their tour cards as well. Shortly after earning his PGA Tour card, he signed with TaylorMade-adidas for endorsement and sponsorship.

In January 2011, Strickler made his first career PGA Tour start at the Farmers Insurance Open. In May 2011, Strickler contended for the lead at the HP Byron Nelson Championship. He posted a 4-under-par 66 in the opening round, carding an eagle and five birdies along the way, including an impressive 52-foot putt at the 15th hole. In December 2011, Strickler made his first appearance at the Australian Masters.

Strickler failed to retain his tour card and returned to the Canadian Tour in 2012. During the 2012 Canadian Tour season, he made six of eight cuts and posted three top-10 finishes. His best finish came at the Dakota Dunes Casino Open in July where Strickler shot -19 to force a playoff in which he narrowly lost to Matt Hill in a sudden-death playoff.

Strickler returned to the renamed PGA Tour Canada in 2013, making six of nine cuts with his best finish coming at The Great Waterway Classic (T-4) where he shot -18. In September 2013, Strickler made his first European Tour appearance where he finished T-11 in the first stage of qualifying school. To wrap up the 2013 season, Strickler successfully advanced through qualifying school to earn conditional status on the Web.com Tour for 2014. He was fully exempt on PGA Tour Canada in 2014 after finishing 35th on the 2013 Order of Merit.

In 2014, Strickler returned to the PGA Tour at the Farmers Insurance Open after earning a spot in the Monday qualifier where he shot 6 under par with one eagle and six birdies. On May 13, 2014, Strickler earned medalist honors at the HP Byron Nelson Championship qualifier after posting a 4-under-par 68, which included six birdies and an eagle on the par-5 18th hole at The Lakes at Castle Hills in Lewisville. He placed second at the 2014 Southern Ontario Open in Burlington, Ontario (a Great Lakes Tour/NGA Tour event) after shooting 16 under par.

== Amateur wins ==
- 2007 Connecticut Amateur
- 2008 Connecticut Amateur

== See also ==
- 2010 PGA Tour Qualifying School graduates
- List of Florida Gators golfers
