= Country Club of Fairfield =

Private golf club in Connecticut

- Interactive map of Country Club of Fairfield
- 41.1272°N 73.2739°W

Club information
- Location: Fairfield, Connecticut, U.S.
- Established: 1921; 105 years ago
- Type: Private
- Total holes: 18
- Designed by: Seth Raynor
- Par: 70
- Length: 6,358 yards (5,814 m)

The Country Club of Fairfield is a private golf and country club on Sasco Hill Road in the Southport section of Fairfield, Connecticut, on the shore of Long Island Sound beside Southport Harbor. Founded in 1914 by financier Oliver Gould Jennings and a group of friends, the club opened its 18-hole course in 1921. The course was laid out by Seth Raynor and later altered by A. W. Tillinghast, Robert Trent Jones Sr., Geoffrey Cornish and, most recently, restoration architect Bruce Hepner. The Country Club of Fairfield has consistently been ranked as a top course in Connecticut.

== History ==
=== Founding (1914) ===
By the 1910s, Brooklawn Country Club was the only golf course in the Fairfield area, and some members felt it had grown crowded. Oliver Gould Jennings, a financier and heir to the Standard Oil fortune described by the Fairfield Museum as the town's leading citizen, was frustrated by waits for tee times and organized a group of influential friends to form a smaller club in 1914. Other founders of the club included Ira DeVer Warner, a Bridgeport industrialist who owned the Warner Brothers Corset Company, George Platt Brett Sr, publisher of author Jack London and Chairman of Macmillan Publishing, and John Hoyt Perry, a Connecticut politician.

Jennings chose the Sasco Point area of Southport, where several of his friends were already building homes. The site was a mix of onion fields sloping down to a tidal marsh along Southport Harbor; the clouds of insects rising from the marsh in summer had earned it the local nickname "Mosquito Hill." Jennings bought about 100 acres of farmland and the eastern section of the beach, and signed a 200-year lease with the town and with landowner Winthrop Perry for the adjoining salt meadow, marsh and beach. An existing farmhouse on Sasco Hill Road was converted into the first clubhouse.

Spectators at a club tournament, c. 1926

=== Construction and opening (1914–1921) ===
Jennings hired Seth Raynor, then an engineer and associate of Charles Blair Macdonald, to design and build the course. It was one of Raynor's first solo commissions. Raynor had recently worked on the large landfill project at Lido Golf Club on Long Island, experience that suited a site that needed to be built up from marsh.

Construction took seven years. During World War I, the federal government ordered improvements to Southport Harbor to make it navigable for patrol boats, and the club's plan to dredge the harbor, fill the marsh and culvert the tidal flow fit that goal. Topsoil was brought from Long Island and moved on site by a small steam locomotive; workmen from the Barnum and Bailey circus's Bridgeport headquarters, who camped on the beach, helped unload it. Because fill was scarce, Raynor kept his green pads lower than on many of his other courses, rarely more than four feet high.

Raynor routed the course on the assumption that a permanent clubhouse would be built on the beach, near the present seventh tee. Shortly after the routing was finished, the club decided to keep using the house on Sasco Hill instead, and the sequence of holes was altered to fit. The club opened officially on July 2, 1921. Professionals Walter Hagen, Johnny Farrell, Joe Kirkwood and Jock Hutchison attended, and four of the founders played the opening foursome.

=== Early decades (1921–1945) ===
Through the 1920s the club hosted invitational amateur events that drew leading players from around the country and attention for the course's design. Membership was initially by invitation to friends and relatives; by the early 1920s the limit had been raised to 150. Social life included teas, luncheons and parties around the Harvard–Yale and Yale–Princeton football games. The club's 1927 "Gold Ball Tournament" featured many notable golfers including Glenna Collett-Vare, later called by the World Golf Hall of Fame as "the greatest female golfer of her day," as well as Maureen Orcutt, Roland MacKenzie, and Max Marston, the 1923 winner of the U.S. Amateur.

Raynor died in 1926, and the club turned to A. W. Tillinghast for further work. Tillinghast sketched a new set of fourth through sixth holes around the property's nine-acre tidal lagoon. His changes moved the green of the par-3 fourth flush against a pond and, in 1939, pushed the sixth green to the right beside the lagoon, bringing water into play on both holes. He also reworked several green complexes. Tillinghast, like Raynor, still planned around an eventual beachside clubhouse.

During the Great Depression, when clubs nationally lost large shares of their members, the club broadened its appeal. In 1935 it built a beach house and tennis courts and created a cheaper membership category aimed at non-golfers and younger families.

=== Postwar changes (1945–1990) ===
After three hurricanes struck the Connecticut shore in 1954, the club abandoned the idea of a beach clubhouse and settled permanently on the higher ground of Sasco Hill.

Robert Trent Jones Sr. was hired around 1960 to add a practice range and reconfigure the course around the inland clubhouse. To make room for the range he eliminated the old par-4 18th. His work was carried out in two phases, in 1961 and 1970. He built three new holes (the 11th, 17th and 18th), so that the round finished up the hill at the clubhouse, and rerouted or changed the par of the 1st, 2nd, 5th, 10th and 12th. Among the changes, the fifth became a dogleg over the lagoon and the 12th was shortened by about 60 yards into a par 4. Jones's friend, the architect Geoffrey Cornish, supervised construction and made further alterations in the 1980s.

=== Restoration (1992–present) ===
In 1992 the membership adopted a master plan that called for restoring the course's Golden Age character. In 1999 the club hired Tom Doak's firm, Renaissance Golf Design, which assigned most of the work to its restoration specialist Bruce Hepner. Hepner, who later went out on his own and remained the club's consulting architect, removed several hundred trees that had blocked views of the Sound, rebuilt Raynor-style bunkering, and tied the Trent Jones holes in visually with Raynor's. Rather than lengthen the course, the club added two shorter tees, at the 14th and 17th. A project to restore the front-left plateau of the 15th hole's double-plateau green was scheduled for the winter of 2009.

The club later replaced its clubhouse with a new one-story building of about 9,500 square feet with a walk-out lower level, overlooking the course and Long Island Sound.

== Golf course ==
The course is a flat, nearly treeless par-70 layout at sea level, exposed to wind off Long Island Sound. The front nine runs counter-clockwise around the perimeter of the property and the back nine runs roughly clockwise inside it, so the wind affects consecutive holes from changing directions. Like most Raynor courses, it is built around "template" holes adapted from famous British originals, though the mix of architects has left bunkering that combines Raynor's deep, steep-walled hazards with Trent Jones's flashed, rounder faces. In places the water table is only a few feet below ground, which prevented Raynor from building his usual Hill bunker at the Eden 14th.

== Tournaments ==
The club has hosted a range of Metropolitan Golf Association (MGA) and Met PGA Section championships, along with the Connecticut Open. At the 2008 Met Open, Timothy Hegarty shot an 8-under 62, then the lowest score in any MGA championship, even though the field averaged nearly five over par per round. Stewart Hagestad broke that record with a 9-under 61 in stroke-play qualifying at the 2016 Met Amateur, the club's first. The inaugural MGA Masters, for amateurs 65 and over, was delayed a year after Tropical Storm Irene damaged the course in 2011.

| Year | Event | Winner | Notes |
|---|---|---|---|
| 2016 | 114th Met Amateur | Stewart Hagestad | Beat Ethan Ng in 38 holes |
| 2012 | Inaugural MGA Masters | Robert Howe | Postponed from 2011 after Tropical Storm Irene |
| 2012 | Met PGA Section Championship | | Held the week after the Masters |
| 2008 | Met Open | Mark Mielke | 205 (−5), won by 3 strokes |
| 2002 | Met PGA Championship | Charlie Bolling | 209 (−1) |
| 1991 | Met PGA Championship | Ron McDougal | 200 (−10), won by 7 strokes |
| 1985 | Met PGA Championship | Don Reese | 210 (E) |

== Reception ==
Sportswriter Dan Jenkins judged the Country Club of Fairfield to be Seth Raynor's best work, calling it short but full of charm. Reviewers have also frequently placed it at or near the top of Connecticut's courses. One Golf Advisor reviewer called it easily the best course in the state. Golf Digest panelists have written that it is as good as it gets in Connecticut, with historic architecture and world-class views, and that it has to be among the top five courses in the state. In Golf Digest's Best in State ranking, it places third in Connecticut. The magazine also includes it in its ranking of America's best courses on the water. Raynor historian George Bahto considered the eighth green one of Raynor's finest, and Hepner ranked the ninth among the strongest Redan holes anywhere.
