= CVS Health Charity Classic =

Golf tournament in Rhode Island, US

Coordinates: 41.73°N 71.33°W

Tournament information
- Location: Barrington, Rhode Island
- Established: 1999
- Course: Rhode Island Country Club
- Tour: PGA Tour
- Format: Team stroke play
- Prize fund: $1,500,000
- Month played: June
- Final year: 2019

Location in the United States

The CVS Health Charity Classic was a professional golf tournament. It was contested annually as a one-day, three-person team event. Each team is made up of one player from each of three Tours: PGA Tour, PGA Tour Champions, and LPGA Tour. The top two scores at each hole for the team count towards the team's final score.

It was held at Rhode Island Country Club in Barrington, Rhode Island. It was an unofficial event on the PGA Tour and was first played in 1999. The original format was a two-man team event, involving players solely from the PGA Tour. However, since 2017, it has become a three-person team event, with players from PGA Tour Champions and LPGA Tour joining up with a PGA Tour player to form each team. Rhode Island natives Brad Faxon and Billy Andrade serve as hosts.

== Television ==
The event was televised by Golf Channel from 1999 to 2010. It was traditionally tape-delayed until 4 p.m. on both days to make buying tickets to the event more appealing. In 2009, the broadcast was delayed until 8 p.m. because the final round of the U.S. Open ran into Monday, and the Golf Channel ran post-tournament coverage during the afternoon. The Classic lost many of the PGA Tour members in its field that year because of the run over.

In 2011, coverage moved to Fox Sports Net. The broadcast was still delayed until 4:00 p.m. as in past years. It was the first PGA Tour sanctioned event ever covered by a Fox network. However, Fox declined to renew its contract, as it did not cover any other golf events, and as such, the event has since been untelevised. It is unknown whether Fox might return to covering the event with the pickup of a small golf schedule, which includes the Franklin Templeton Shootout, an event very similar to the CVS Caremark Charity Classic.

== Charity event winners ==
CVS Health Charity Classic

- 2019 Keegan Bradley, Brooke Henderson and Billy Andrade
- 2018 Keegan Bradley, Brooke Henderson and Billy Andrade
- 2017 Keegan Bradley, Brooke Henderson and Billy Andrade
- 2016 Keegan Bradley and Jon Curran
- 2015 Keegan Bradley and Jon Curran

CVS Caremark Charity Classic

- 2014 Steve Stricker and Bo Van Pelt
- 2013 Steve Stricker and Bo Van Pelt
- 2012 Jay Haas and Morgan Pressel
- 2011 Matt Kuchar and Zach Johnson
- 2010 Ricky Barnes and J. B. Holmes
- 2009 Nick Price and David Toms
- 2008 Bubba Watson and Camilo Villegas
- 2007 Stewart Cink and J. J. Henry

CVS/pharmacy Charity Classic

- 2006 Tim Clark and Nick Price

CVS Charity Classic

- 2005 Chris DiMarco and Fred Funk
- 2004 Bill Haas and Jay Haas
- 2003 Rocco Mediate and Jeff Sluman
- 2002 Chris DiMarco and Dudley Hart
- 2001 Mark Calcavecchia and Nick Price
- 2000 Justin Leonard and Davis Love III
- 1999 Stuart Appleby and Jeff Sluman

== See also ==
- CVS Charity Classic - a former PGA Tour event of the same name
