= Yale Bulldogs golf =

University sports team, founded 1896

Yale University Bulldogs golf
- Founded: Men's: 1896 Women's: 1980
- University: Yale University
- Conference: Ivy League
- Head coach: Men's: Keith Tyburski (2023-present) Women's: Lauren Harling (2019-present)
- Location: New Haven, Connecticut
- Course: Yale Golf Course
- Nickname: Bulldogs

NCAA champions
- Men (21): 1897, 1898 (Fall), 1902 (Spring), 1905, 1906, 1907, 1908, 1909, 1910, 1911, 1912, 1913, 1915, 1924, 1925, 1926, 1931, 1932, 1933, 1936, 1943

NCAA individual champions
- Men (13): John Reid Jr. (1898 Spring), Charles Hitchcock Jr. (1902 Spring), Robert Abbott (1905), W.E. Clow Jr. (1906), Ellis Knowles (1907), Robert Hunter (1910), George Stanley (1911), Nathaniel Wheeler (1913), Francis Blossom (1915), Jess Sweetser (1920), Dexter Cummings (1923, 1924), Tom Aycock (1929)

Conference champions
- Men (12): 1984, 1985, 1988, 1990, 1991, 1996, 1997, 2003, 2011, 2018, 2022, 2024 Women (7): 1997, 1998, 2000, 2002, 2003, 2006, 2011

Individual conference champions
- Men (16): Peter Teravainen (1977, 1978), Jim Goff (1984), Bill Huddleston (1985), Chip Arndt (1988), Bob Heintz (1990, 1991, 1992), Ken Rivzi (1996), Chris Eckerle (1999), Louis Aurelio (2001), Brian Kim (2003), Eoin Leonard (2018), James Nicholas (2019), Ben Carpenter (2022, 2024) Women (5): Natalie Wong (1998), Sarah Seo (2000), Cindy Shin (2005), Alyssa Roland (2010), Jennifer Peng (2016)

The Yale Bulldogs golf teams represent Yale University in intercollegiate competition. The men's team has won more national team championships and more individual national championships than any other university golf program in the United States. The women's team was founded in 1980 and has won a number of Ivy League championships. The teams play out of the Yale Golf Course and compete as members of the Ivy League.

== History ==
=== Early success ===
In the fall of 1896, Yale Alumni Weekly reported that a "new game," golf, was the "rage among seniors" at the school. Students used hockey sticks and tennis balls to simulate golf clubs and golf balls on a "makeshift course" on campus. For a more "serious" game, students traveled off-campus to a complete, nine-hole course, New Haven Golf Club, that had been completed the previous year. The top Yale undergraduates at New Haven created an independent organization, Yale Golf Club, later in the fall. In November, they played their "first intercollegiate competition." The match was against Columbia University. Yale won the event. In December, it was announced that Yale would discuss founding an "intercollegiate golf association" with representatives of Harvard, Princeton, Columbia, and the University of Pennsylvania. The first intercollegiate championship was held the following year. They won the tournament against Harvard 24-4.

The game continued to gain popularity through the 1890s. In 1897, the Brooklyn Times-Union noted that the sport was rivaling football in popularity. The following year, the Brooklyn Daily Eagle announced that students from Yale were showing an "unusual interest in the game." In May 1898, Yale won the intercollegiate championship for the second straight year. The New York Times reported that the overall quality of play at the tournament was "much better golf [than] was shown... last year." The following year, it was reported by The Boston Globe that Yale students' enthusiasm for the sport was so strong that they had essentially monopolized the facilities at New Haven Golf Club. The Globe stated, "The popularity of the game has so taxed the capacity of New Haven Golf Club that most of the townspeople have gone to the New Haven Country Club and left the golf club to the students. The links of the New Haven Club are convenient to the campus and the students have been joining the club by the dozen, preparatory for the coming season." The game's prestige at the university continued to advance. In May 1899, it was announced that Yale golfers could place the revered "Y" emblem on their jackets like other athletes could, a sign that the sport "had been placed on an equality with other sports." In April 1900, the legendary Harry Vardon played exhibition matches at New Haven Golf Club against Yale golfers. Vardon broke the course record and the event received much media attention, including from The New York Times.

In the early 1900s, however, Yale's team had fallen slightly backward in recent years, however, losing three consecutive intercollegiate championships to Harvard. A few days after their final loss to Harvard, Charles Hitchcock was promoted to team captain. He felt that Yale's performance was "very lax over two years" and "decided to send the team into some practice matches this fall" in an effort to improve performance. Over the course of the 1901-02 academic year, Yale's performance improved and Hitchcock himself had great success. In 1902 finals, Yale "developed an unexpectedly forceful game" and beat Harvard 18-6. Captain Hitchcock displayed a "great performance" in his individual match, winning 8 up. According to The Boston Globe, the "glory in Hitchcock's score was more in evidence with the boys than delight in their defeat of Harvard." In the individual tournament, played a few days later, Hitchcock again scored "an easy victory" over his competitor, claiming honors. In late May, Hitchcock completed his great year by winning the Yale University Golf Championship.

A few years later, in 1905, Yale began one of the greatest stretches in the history of college golf, winning the intercollegiate championship nine consecutive years. Yale also possessed some of the top individual golfers in the country during this era. The team included Eben Byers and Robert Gardner, champions of the U.S. Amateur in 1906 and 1909, respectively. In addition, Buck Merriman, winner of the 1909 and 1910 Connecticut Amateur, and Harry Legg, the 1910 Trans-Mississippi Amateur champion, represented Yale. A number of Yale golfers also won individual intercollegiate championship in the early 1900s too. In 1905, Robert Abbott won the event. Subsequently, W.E. Clow, Jr. and Ellis Knowles won the individual tournament. A few years later, in 1910, Robert Hunter won the individual championship and George Stanley followed him.

By the 1920s, however, Yale had not won a championship in several years. George Townsend Adee made some proposals to the Director of the Athletic Association to improve the program. One of them was to create a new golf course. In 1923, construction on Yale Golf Course began and opened three years later. In addition, in 1926 the university hired a new coach, the Scottish-born Ben Thomson. The team was also able to recruit a number of star golfers during this era, including Paul Haviland and Jess Sweetser, the future legend.

The changes paid off and by the mid-1920s, Yale's team was again among the best in the nation. In 1924, Yale won the first of three consecutive national championship. In 1929, Yale became a founding member of the Eastern Intercollegiate Association (EIGA). Yale had great success in the EIGA, winning eight consecutive conference championships starting in 1931. In the 1930s, Yale also had much success at the national intercollegiate golf tournament. In 1931, Jack Reese was medalist at the event while Sidney Noyes, Jr., also of Yale, finished joint runner-up. The remaining players from Yale, especially Aycock, played well and with a 610 total they defeated Princeton by four strokes. They successfully repeated as team champions the following two years. In 1935, they lost the national finals to the University of Michigan but won the following year.

=== Post War War II ===
In the 1940s, however, Yale entered a period of decline, partly due to sacrifices related to World War II. In 1942, Yale announced it would "dispense with the services of three veteran coaches" including Ben Thomson, the golf coach, "as a wartime economy move." Thomson coached the team for 17 years. In the spring, the team's captain Edmund Gravely was recruited by the United States Air Force. Arthur Williams was elected captain shortly thereafter however he was also quickly drafted into World War II. Overall, the Yale team won no notable championships from 1944 to 1948.

Shortly thereafter, in the late 1940s and early 1950s, the Yale golf team began playing better. Yale won the Eastern Intercollegiate Championship in 1949, 1951, 1953, and 1954. In addition, Lincoln Roden III won the 1951 Eastern Intercollegiate individual championship. In 1955, Al Wilson became the golf coach. Wilson coached the team for 15 years. The Yale golf team had much success during this era. During Wilson's tenure, the team recorded 136 wins against 14 losses for a winning percentage of 90%. This included seven Eastern Intercollegiate Championships. During this era, Robert Trent Jones Jr. and Rees Jones, future golf course architects, participated as a player and manager, respectively, for the team.

Shortly thereafter, marked another period of decline. "The 1970s were not a good times for Yale golf," it was reported. Coach Wilson left his position in 1970. Yale undergraduates were reportedly uninterested in golf during the era. The Yale golf team "won no league championships" during the first half of the 1970s. University administration was considering selling Yale Golf Course.

In the 1970s, Scottish-born David Paterson became the golf coach. Paterson turned around the team. He arranged a national schedule where Yale would play the best schools around the nation in an effort to improve performance. Paterson also inaugurated a number of significant tournaments, including the William S. Beinecke Annual Member-Guest Tournament, Widdy Neale Invitational, Yale Men's College-Am, Yale Fall Intercollegiate Tournament (now Macdonald Cup), F.A. Borsodi Student Championship, "Scratch Cup," and Yale Spring Opener. During this era, the future PGA Tour and European Tour pro Peter Teravainen played on the golf team. By freshman year, he was generally regarded as the best player on the team. In 1980, Paterson also inaugurated a spring break golf trip to the United Kingdom for the Yale golf team. This event would occur at four year intervals. The Yale golf team would play matches against leading British universities and golf clubs. Later on, at the end of the 20th century, the Yale golf team won the Ivy League championship in back-to-back years, in 1996 and 1997. In 2008, Paterson retired.

== Women's coaching history ==
| Coach | Tenure | Accolades |
|---|---|---|
| David Paterson | 1980–1993 | One of the driving forces behind the creation of the Yale women's golf team. Coached the team to their first victory in program history at the Mount Holyoke Invitational. |
| Darci Wilson | 1993–1994 | Yale's first ever female golf coach on the men's or women's side. |
| Amy Huether | 1994–1997 | Coached the team to their first ever Ivy League Championship by 34 shots in 1997. Coached Yale's first three All-Ivy selections: Charity Barras, Natalie Wong, Chawwadee Rompothong. |
| Heather Daly-Donofrio | 1997–2000 | Two Ivy League Championships: 1998 and 2000. Coached the program's first ever Individual Ivy League Champion, Natalie Wong (1998). |
| Mary Moan | 2000–2006 | Two Ivy League Championships: 2002 and 2003. Two NCAA Regional Appearances: 2002 and 2003. Multiple team victories. |
| Chawwadee Rompothong | 2006–2019 | Two Ivy League Championships: 2006 and 2011, Three Ivy League Championship runner-ups: 2009, 2010, 2015. Coached Three Ivy League Individual Champions. Won inaugural Ivy League Women's Coach of the Year Award in 2015. |
| Lauren Harling | 2019–present | Coached the team to three top-five finishes in the team's five tournaments prior to the season being canceled due to COVID-19. |
