= Scott Gordon (golfer) =

American professional golfer (born 1981)

Personal information
- Full name: Scott Ryan Gordon
- Nationality: United States
- Born: May 1, 1981 (age 45) Sacramento, California, U.S.
- Height: 6 ft 0 in (1.83 m)
- Weight: 170 lb (77 kg; 12 st)

Career
- Sport: Golf
- College: University of California, Davis
- Turned professional: 2004
- Former tours: PGA Tour; Nationwide Tour

Scott Ryan Gordon (born May 1, 1981) is an American professional golfer who plays on the PGA Tour.

== Career ==
In 2004, Gordon graduated from the University of California, Davis and turned professional that year. In 2008, he qualified for the Nationwide Tour, playing in 26 tournaments and making four cuts. Gordon made it to the final stage of qualifying school for the PGA Tour in 2010, and earned his playing rights for the following year by a single stroke. This made him the first ever UC Davis Aggie golfer to make it to the PGA Tour.

== See also ==
- 2010 PGA Tour Qualifying School graduates
