= Zack Miller =

American professional golfer (born 1984)

Personal information
- Nationality: United States
- Born: July 5, 1984 (age 42) Greenbrae, California, U.S.
- Height: 6 ft 2 in (1.88 m)
- Weight: 195 lb (88 kg; 13.9 st)

Career
- Sport: Golf
- College: Stanford University
- Turned professional: 2007
- Former tours: PGA Tour; Nationwide Tour; Korean Tour; Gateway Tour
- Professional wins: 2

Zack Miller (born July 5, 1984) is an American professional golfer who has played on the PGA Tour.

== Career ==
In 2007, Miller graduated from Stanford University where he was captain of the golf team. He turned professional that year, and spent two years playing on the Korean Tour and Gateway Tour, where he won twice.

In 2010 he qualified for the Nationwide Tour, finishing 56th in the standings, and at the end of that year graduated to the main PGA Tour via the qualifying school.

== Professional wins (2) ==
=== Gateway Tour wins (2) ===
No.	Date	Tournament	Winning score	Margin of victory	Runner-up
1	Jul 31, 2009	Desert Summer 7	−19 (65-69-63=197)	2 strokes	(United States) Brandon Knight
2	Aug 21, 2009	Desert Summer 9	−16 (69-64-67=200)	3 strokes	(Australia) Jake Younan-Wise

== See also ==
- 2010 PGA Tour Qualifying School graduates
