= Wampanoag Country Club =

Club in Connecticut, United States

Coordinates: 41°48′02″N 72°45′19″W

- Interactive map of Wampanoag Country Club

Club information
- Location: West Hartford, Connecticut, U.S.
- Established: 1924
- Type: Private
- Operator: Isaac W. Storandt
- Tota holes: 18
- Tournaments: Connecticut Amateur: 1930, 1939, 1955, 1963, 1973, 1982, 2003; Connecticut Open: 1932, 1937, 1940, 1950, 1968, 1980; New England Amateur: 1960
- Website: https://www.wampanoagcc.com/
- Designed by: Donald Ross (golf course architect)
- Par: 72
- Length: 7,011
- Course rating: 73.4

Wampanoag Country Club is a country club in West Hartford, Connecticut. The club was created in the early 1920s by the famed golf course architect Donald Ross. His design was considered "one of his masterpieces" and the club hosted the Connecticut Open, PGA Tour-level event, shortly after its creation. In the 1950s, "a new era" was inaugurated when new clubhouse was created. The club has continued to host significant tournaments through the 21st century, including the Connecticut Amateur and the Connecticut Women's Open.

== History ==
In the early 1920s, 330 men from the area decided to spend $1,000 each to purchase territory near Hartford to create a country club. The club's property was acquired in April 1924.

The course was designed by the well-known golf course architect Donald Ross. In June 1924, builder Peter Sazio and engineer Fred Dale began work on creating the course. Shortly thereafter, "[e]ntire charge of the proposition" was given to J.G. Kanter, an "expert" golf course construction engineer. In 1925, the course was under construction. As of February 1925, everything was moving ahead of schedule. The course was to exist upon 185 acres. The course was intended to have moderate terrain, never rising above "fifty feet" with "undulations [that] gently rise and fall" and a lack of "steep hills." The engineering was known to be ahead of its time and the bunkers were intended to be "self-draining."

The members of the club also wanted a clubhouse. Construction of the clubhouse was intended to begin in the spring of 1925 and the clubhouse was expected to open concurrent with the golf course. However, building the "golf course was above expectations" and the intended clubhouse was not completed. The members decided to purchase a farmhouse on North Main Street and use that as a clubhouse.

In 1928, the golf course was complete. William B. Goodwin would be the first president. Over half a million dollars had been invested to create the club. It was also announced that the entrance membership fee was $1,000 and annual membership fees were $150. Membership was then limited to 350 people but was intended to expand to 400 people.

In the 1930s, the course began hosting significant tournaments. The club hosted the Connecticut Open, then a PGA Tour-level event, several times during this era.

In 1954, construction for a new clubhouse began. The Anderson Fairoaks Construction Company was commissioned to build the clubhouse. On January 22, 1955, the new clubhouse with "ranch-style architecture" opened. A swimming pool and locker room were new additions from the old clubhouse. According to The Hartford Courant, "[o]nly minor changes" were made to the golf course.

A few months after the opening of the new clubhouse, the course hosted the Connecticut Amateur. Wampanoag has hosted the tournament several times since then. In the late 20th and early 21st century, Wampanoag has hosted a number of other significant tournaments. In 1998, the course hosted the Kennedy Cup, an event pitting local golfers from Hartford County, Connecticut against amateur golfers from Wexford County, Ireland. In 2005, the course hosted the Connecticut Women's Open. The event was won by Elizabeth Janangelo, a member of the club.

== Scorecard ==
Wampanoag Country Club
Tee	Rating/Slope	1	2	3	4	5	6	7	8	9	Out	10	11	12	13	14	15	16	17	18	In	Total
Par		4	4	3	5	4	5	4	4	3	36	4	5	5	3	4	4	3	4	4	36	72
SI	(Men)	15	5	13	7	3	9	11	1	17		10	8	6	12	14	2	18	16	4
Blue	M: 72.4 / 136	370	399	199	465	402	492	337	439	159	3,262	384	463	509	225	368	427	174	366	432	3,348	6,610
White	M: 71.5 / 134 W: 77.8 / 141	361	392	193	458	381	476	327	429	152	3,169	368	453	505	219	358	402	161	358	420	3,244	6,413
Yellow	M: 69.5 / 127	358	353	158	417	354	434	324	425	142	2,965	272	418	456	184	275	347	152	342	376	2,822	5,787
Red	W: 72.5 / 128	355	365	153	340	355	403	315	420	147	2,853	235	394	462	187	260	370	145	326	300	2,679	5,532
SI	(Women)	7	13	17	1	3	11	5	9	15		18	4	8	12	14	2	16	10	6
