= Dick Chapman =

American amateur golfer (1911–1978)

Personal information
- Full name: Richard Davol Chapman
- Nationality: United States
- Born: March 23, 1911 Greenwich, Connecticut, U.S.
- Died: November 15, 1978 (aged 67) Rancho Santa Fe, California, U.S.
- Height: 5 ft 10 in (1.78 m)
- Weight: 168 lb (76 kg; 12.0 st)

Career
- Sport: Golf
- Status: Amateur

Best results in major championships (wins: 2)
- Masters Tournament: 11th: 1954
- PGA Championship: DNP
- U.S. Open: T21: 1954
- The Open Championship: CUT: 1961
- U.S. Amateur: Won: 1940
- British Amateur: Won: 1951

Richard Davol Chapman (March 23, 1911 – November 15, 1978) was an American amateur golfer. Time magazine dubbed him "the Ben Hogan of amateur golf".

== Career ==
Chapman was born in Greenwich, Connecticut.

Chapman won the 1940 U.S. Amateur. He was a member of Winged Foot Golf Club in Mamaroneck, New York, which was the site of his first major triumph. He remains one of only three players to have won a USGA title on their home course. He holds a place in the Masters Tournament record book for the most appearances (19) as an amateur, a distinction he shares with Charles Coe.

Although Chapman was quite the international player, winning the 1951 British Amateur and French Amateur twice. Chapman also won a number of notable domestic events, including the Connecticut Amateur, Massachusetts Amateur, New York Amateur, New England Amateur, and Carolinas Amateur. He also won the prestigious North and South Amateur. At the 1958 U.S. Amateur, Chapman and his son, Dixie, both qualified, giving a rare father-and-son appearance.

Chapman's career was put on hold for World War II, where he served as a major in the U.S. Army Air Corps. After the war, Chapman picked up where he left off, with a string of victories in the British, French, Canadian, and Italian amateurs. Chapman is one of only two players (the other is Harvie Ward) who has won the U.S., British, and Canadian Amateur Championships.

"Blessed with a strong competitive spirit and an inquiring mind into the technicalities of the swing," reads the entry on Chapman in Who's Who in Golf. "Chapman not only played the game but wrote about it and worked at its many phases."

In the 1950s, Chapman collaborated with the USGA on a handicap format for foursomes play called the Chapman System, also known as Pinehurst or American Foursomes. The system worked as follows: two golfers on the same team each tee off, then play the other's ball. From there, they select the ball with which to complete the hole and continue as in foursomes.

Chapman played on the winning Walker Cup teams in 1947, 1951, and 1953. Chapman was a member of The Tin Whistles. Chapman's final success came in 1967 with a victory in the International Senior Amateur.

== Death ==
In the early 1970s, a stroke hampered his career. In 1978, he died in Rancho Santa Fe, California.

== Awards and honors ==
- In 1986, Chapman was inducted into the Carolinas Golf Association Hall of Fame
- In 2001, Chapman was inducted into the Connecticut Golf Hall of Fame

== Amateur wins ==
this list is probably incomplete

- 1934 Westchester Amateur
- 1936 Connecticut Amateur
- 1938 Connecticut Amateur
- 1939 French Amateur, New York State Amateur
- 1940 U.S. Amateur
- 1948 Golf Illustrated Gold Vase
- 1949 Canadian Amateur
- 1950 Massachusetts Amateur
- 1951 British Amateur, New England Amateur
- 1952 French Amateur
- 1953 Carolinas Amateur
- 1957 Carolinas Amateur
- 1958 North and South Amateur
- 1960 Italian Open Amateur

== Major championships ==
=== Amateur wins (2) ===
Year	Championship	Winning score	Runner-up
1940	U.S. Amateur	11 & 9	(United States) Duff McCullough
1951	British Amateur	5 & 4	(United States) Charles Coe

=== Results timeline ===
Tournament	1934	1935	1936	1937	1938	1939
Masters Tournament						T37
U.S. Open	WD				T50	
British Open						
U.S. Amateur			R256		SF	R16
British Amateur		R16	R256	QF		QF

Tournament	1940	1941	1942	1943	1944	1945	1946	1947	1948	1949
Masters Tournament		T19 LA		NT	NT	NT	T41	T14	T40 LA	50
U.S. Open	T36	T49	NT	NT	NT	NT		CUT		
British Open	NT	NT	NT	NT	NT	NT				
U.S. Amateur	1 M	R64	NT	NT	NT	NT	R16	R16	R128	
British Amateur	NT	NT	NT	NT	NT	NT		2	R16	

Tournament	1950	1951	1952	1953	1954	1955	1956	1957	1958	1959
Masters Tournament	T35	T20	T55	37	11	T53	T65	CUT	CUT	CUT
U.S. Open				CUT	T21				CUT	54
British Open										
U.S. Amateur	R32	R32				R256	R64	QF	R16	R64
British Amateur	2	1	R32							

Tournament	1960	1961	1962
Masters Tournament	DQ	CUT	CUT
U.S. Open	CUT		
British Open		CUT	
U.S. Amateur	R64		R32
British Amateur			

Note: Chapman never played in the PGA Championship.

Win
Top 10
Did not play

M = Medalist
LA = Low Amateur
NT = No tournament
WD = withdrew
CUT = missed the half-way cut
R256, R128, R64, R32, R16, QF, SF = Round in which player lost in match play
"T" indicates a tie for a place

Source for The Masters: www.masters.com
Source for U.S. Open and U.S. Amateur: USGA Championship Database
Sources for British Amateur: The Glasgow Herald, May 24, 1935, pg. 22., The Glasgow Herald, May 26, 1936, pg. 20., The Glasgow Herald, May 29, 1937, pg. 21., The Glasgow Herald, May 27, 1939, pg. 3., The Glasgow Herald, May 28, 1948, pg. 6., The Glasgow Herald, May 30, 1952, pg. 2., www.opengolf.com
Source: Past Champions at Winged Foot Golf Club

== U.S. national team appearances ==
Amateur

- Walker Cup: 1947 (winners), 1951 (winners), 1953 (winners)
