= Dick Siderowf =

American amateur golfer (born 1937)

Personal information
- Full name: Richard L. Siderowf
- Nationality: United States
- Born: July 3, 1937 (age 89) New Britain, Connecticut, U.S.

Career
- Sport: Golf
- College: Duke University
- Status: Amateur
- Professional wins: 3

Best results in major championships
- Masters Tournament: 46th: 1969, 1976
- PGA Championship: DNP
- U.S. Open: T57: 1968
- The Open Championship: DNP

Richard L. Siderowf (born July 3, 1937) is an American amateur golfer, who is best known for winning the British Amateur twice.

== Early life ==
Siderowf was born in New Britain, Connecticut. He attended Duke University and played golf for the Blue Devils.

== Golf career ==
Siderowf's first British Amateur victory came in 1973, a 5 and 3 victory over Peter H. Moody, at Royal Porthcawl Golf Club in Wales. His second British title came in 1976, on the 37th hole over J.C. Davies. In the match against Davies, over the Old Course at St Andrews in Scotland, Siderowf hooked his ball so far left on the 36th hole of the match—the 18th at St Andrews—that it came to rest next to the caddiemaster's office near the first tee. Befuddled, he asked his local caddie the distance to the green, and the caddie replied, "I don't know, I've never had someone hit it here before." Siderowf managed a halve and won the championship on the first hole of sudden death.

In his career, Siderowf has won numerous other amateur tournaments. He is a five-time winner of both the Connecticut Amateur and the Metropolitan Amateur. He won the Connecticut Open three times and the Northeast Amateur twice. He has also won the Canadian Amateur, the New England Amateur, the Sunnehanna Amateur, and the Azalea Invitational.

One of America's most renowned amateurs, Siderowf played on four Walker Cup teams (1969, 1973, 1975, 1977), and was captain of the 1979 team, all winning teams. He also played on two Eisenhower Trophy teams, in 1968 (winning) and 1976.

Former Ryder Cup captain and PGA Championship winner Hal Sutton credited Siderowf with jump-starting his career, by selecting him to the Walker Cup team in 1979, Sutton's first major international competition.

In 1982, Siderowf attempted to become the first American to win the British Amateur three times. He reached the fourth round where he played South African Wilhelm Winsnes. Siderowf, in his words, "hit a lot of dumb shots out there" including a number of missed "short putts." He lost to par six times which facilitated Winsnes' 4 & 3 victory.

Siderowf still plays golf regularly, mostly at Century Country Club in Purchase, New York, where he won the club championship in 1978 in his only attempt, The Connecticut Golf Club in Easton, CT as well as at Seminole Golf Club, the renowned Donald Ross design in Juno Beach, Florida.

== Personal life ==
For his career, Siderowf worked as a stockbroker.

== Honors and awards ==
- In 1974, Siderowf was inducted into the Connecticut Golf Hall of Fame.
- In 1988, he was inducted into the Duke Sports Hall of Fame.

== Tournament wins ==
- 1955 Connecticut Amateur
- 1958 Connecticut Open
- 1959 Connecticut Open
- 1960 Connecticut Amateur
- 1961 Sunnehanna Amateur, New England Amateur
- 1962 Northeast Amateur
- 1965 Connecticut Amateur
- 1966 Northeast Amateur
- 1968 Metropolitan Amateur
- 1969 Azalea Invitational, Metropolitan Amateur
- 1970 Metropolitan Amateur
- 1971 Canadian Amateur
- 1973 British Amateur, Connecticut Open
- 1974 Metropolitan Amateur
- 1976 British Amateur
- 1984 Connecticut Amateur
- 1985 Connecticut Amateur
- 1989 Metropolitan Amateur
- 1996 Metropolitan Senior Amateur

== U.S. national team appearances ==
Amateur

- Eisenhower Trophy: 1968 (winners), 1976
- Walker Cup: 1969 (winners), 1973 (winners), 1975 (winners), 1977 (winners), 1979 (winners, non-playing captain)
