= Bill Mallon =

American surgeon, golfer, and historian (born 1952)

Personal information
- Full name: William James Mallon
- Nationality: United States
- Born: February 2, 1952 (age 74) Paterson, New Jersey, U.S.
- Height: 5 ft 10 in (1.78 m)
- Weight: 165 lb (75 kg; 11.8 st)

Career
- Sport: Golf
- College: Duke University
- Turned professional: 1975
- Former tour: PGA Tour
- Professional wins: 2

Best results in major championships
- Masters Tournament: DNP
- PGA Championship: DNP
- U.S. Open: 53rd: 1977
- The Open Championship: DNP

William James Mallon (born February 2, 1952) is an American orthopedic surgeon, former professional golfer and a historian of the Olympic Games.

== Early life and education ==
Mallon was born in Paterson, New Jersey. He studied at Duke University and graduated magna cum laude with an A.B. in math and physics.

== Golf career ==
While at Duke University, Mallon played collegiate golf and was a two-time All-American, twice voted to the Outstanding College Athletes of America and was a two-time participant in the NCAA tournament. He won over 40 amateur tournaments including two victories each at the Massachusetts Amateur and New England Amateur. He also has won the Middle Atlantic Amateur once.

In 1975, Mallon turned professional. He joined the PGA Tour after qualifying Fall 1975 PGA Tour Qualifying School. Mallon played four seasons, from 1976 to 1979, posting three top-10 finishes. Mallon played in the 1977 U.S. Open, finishing 53rd. He was also on the editorial staff of Golf Digest.

== Medical career ==
During his golf career in the 1970s, Mallon injured his shoulder and required surgery, which he said helped him become interested in medicine. After retiring from golf, Mallon became an orthopedic surgeon specializing in complex shoulder reconstructions. He also served as the editor-in-chief of the Journal of Shoulder and Elbow Surgery. He did a fellowship with Richard Hawkins at the University of Western Ontario.

== Olympics historian ==
Mallon is a notable historian of the Olympic Games. By 2022 he had written 24 books on the subject. He is a member of the International Society of Olympic Historians as well as the official historian for the United States Olympic & Paralympic Committee. Mallon is also the founder of Olympedia, an online encyclopedia website owned by the International Olympic Committee compiling data on the history of the Olympics. He was awarded the Olympic Order in 2001.
