= 2010 PGA Tour Qualifying School graduates =

This is a list of the 29 players who earned their 2011 PGA Tour card through Q School in 2010. Note: Michael Putnam and Justin Hicks had already qualified for the PGA Tour by placing in the Top 25 during the 2010 Nationwide Tour season; they did not count among the Top 25 Q school graduates, but Putnam did improve his status.

Place	Player	PGA Tour starts	Cuts made	Notes
1	(United States) Billy Mayfair	673	433	5 PGA Tour wins
T2	(United States) William McGirt	2	0	
T2	(United States) Ben Martin	3	0	2009 U.S. Amateur runner-up
4	(United States) Cameron Tringale	22	5	
5	(Australia) Jarrod Lyle	65	35	2 Nationwide Tour wins
T6	(United States) Michael Putnam	36	23	1 Nationwide Tour win
T6	(United States) Brandt Jobe	266	147	6 Japan Golf Tour wins
T6	(United States) Zack Miller	1	0	
T9	(United States) Kyle Stanley	12	6	
T9	(United States) Paul Stankowski	364	197	2 PGA Tour wins
T11	(United States) Gary Woodland	26	11	
T11	(Canada) Chris Baryla	13	5	1 Nationwide Tour win Retained rookie status after making only seven starts in 2010
T11	(United States) Nate Smith	0	0	1 Nationwide Tour win
T11	(United States) Scott Stallings	0	0	Fell one stroke short of a Tour Card in 2009 Q School
T11	(South Korea) Kim Bi-o	0	0	
T16	(Canada) Matt McQuillan	0	0	
T16	(United States) Michael Thompson	4	3	2007 U.S. Amateur runner-up, 2010 leading money-winner on NGA Tour
T16	(United States) Joseph Bramlett	2	0	One of only two players of African-American descent on the Tour, first through Q School since 1985
T16	(South Korea) Kang Sung-hoon	0	0	
T16	(United States) Kent Jones	323	162	2 Nationwide Tour wins
T16	(United States) James Driscoll	139	64	1 Nationwide Tour win
T22	(Brazil) Alexandre Rocha	4	1	Second Brazilian to earn a PGA Tour card after Jaime Gonzalez
T22	(United States) Jim Renner	1	0	
T22	(Sweden) Richard S. Johnson	212	119	1 PGA Tour win
T22	(United States) Andres Gonzales	2	2	
T22	(United States) Justin Hicks	3	1	2 Nationwide Tour wins
T27	(United States) Scott Gordon	0	0	
T27	(United States) Billy Horschel	7	0	Retained rookie status after making only four starts in 2010
T27	(United States) Will Strickler	0	0	

- Players in yellow are 2011 PGA Tour rookies.

== 2011 Results ==
Player	Starts	Cuts made	Best finish	Money list rank	Earnings ($)
(United States) Billy Mayfair	29	17	T6	109	780,578
(United States) William McGirt*	32	19	T16	141	532,933
(United States) Ben Martin*	25	12	T6	164	340,080
(United States) Cameron Tringale	32	23	T4	68	1,327,807
(Australia) Jarrod Lyle	29	12	T5	167	317,459
(United States) Michael Putnam	21	13	T12	153	398,400
(United States) Brandt Jobe	28	21	T2	51	1,629,764
(United States) Zack Miller*	30	13	T9	147	427,341
(United States) Kyle Stanley*	28	22	2	55	1,523,657
(United States) Paul Stankowski	24	14	T21	177	290,211
(United States) Gary Woodland	25	21	Win	17	3,448,591
(Canada) Chris Baryla*	20	1	T18	219	68,000
(United States) Nate Smith*	24	8	T30	201	154,814
(United States) Scott Stallings*	28	13	Win	41	1,957,162
(South Korea) Kim Bi-o*	25	10	T11	162	345,588
(Canada) Matt McQuillan*	21	7	T3	137	582,933
(United States) Michael Thompson*	25	15	3	98	935,265
(United States) Joseph Bramlett*	25	12	T18	196	178,728
(South Korea) Kang Sung-hoon*	21	11	T3	120	702,382
(United States) Kent Jones	25	14	11	159	360,624
(United States) James Driscoll	24	12	5	114	741,010
(Brazil) Alexandre Rocha*	22	11	T20	184	225,026
(United States) Jim Renner*	22	11	T4	155	392,945
(Sweden) Richard S. Johnson	23	10	T21	186	212,106
(United States) Andres Gonzales*	21	9	T16	192	186,847
(United States) Justin Hicks*	23	7	T14	179	284,990
(United States) Scott Gordon*	19	2	T45	237	28,311
(United States) Billy Horschel*	25	11	T7	140	533,024
(United States) Will Strickler*	19	6	T32	213	109,031

*PGA Tour rookie in 2011
T = Tied
Green background indicates the player retained his PGA Tour card for 2012 (finished inside the top 125).
Yellow background indicates the player did not retain his PGA Tour card for 2012, but retained conditional status (finished between 126-150).
Red background indicates the player did not retain his PGA Tour card for 2012 (finished outside the top 150).

== Winners on the PGA Tour in 2011 ==
No.	Date	Player	Tournament	Runner-up	Winning score	Margin of victory
1	Mar 20	(United States) Gary Woodland	Transitions Championship	(United States) Webb Simpson	−15 (67-68-67-67=269)	1 stroke
2	Jul 31	(United States) Scott Stallings	Greenbrier Classic	(United States) Bill Haas, (United States) Bob Estes	−10 (70-65-66-69=270)	Playoff

== Runners-up on the PGA Tour in 2011 ==
No.	Date	Player	Tournament	Winner	Winning score	Runner-up score
1	Jan 23	(United States) Gary Woodland lost in three-man playoff	Bob Hope Classic	(Venezuela) Jhonattan Vegas	−27 (64-67-67-66-69=333)	−27 (65-69-64-66-69=333)
2	Jun 5	(United States) Brandt Jobe	Memorial Tournament	(United States) Steve Stricker	−16 (68-67-69-68=272)	−15 (71-68-69-65=273)
3	Jul 10	(United States) Kyle Stanley	John Deere Classic	(United States) Steve Stricker	−22 (66-64-63-69=262)	−21 (65-67-65-66=263)

== See also ==
- 2010 Nationwide Tour graduates
