= U.S. Junior Amateur =

National golf championship for boys under 19

The United States Junior Amateur Championship is one of the fourteen U.S. national golf championships organized by the United States Golf Association. It is open to amateur boys who are under 19 on the last day of the competition and have a USGA Handicap Index of 4.4 or less. The competition was established in 1948. It consists of two days of stroke play, with the leading 64 competitors then playing a match play competition to decide the champion.

The first tournament in 1948 was won by Dean Lind from a field of 495 entries. In 1999, the tournament set a record with 4,508 entries. Only two players have won the championship multiple times: Tiger Woods won the tournament for three consecutive years beginning in 1991; Jordan Spieth won in 2009 and 2011. In 2010, Jim Liu, at 14 years, 11 months, became the youngest champion ever, breaking Woods' mark of 15 years and 220 days.

The number of winners who have gone on to become PGA pros is considerable. Apart from Woods, well known winners include Johnny Miller (1964), David Duval (1989), Hunter Mahan (1999), Jordan Spieth (2009 and 2011), and Scottie Scheffler (2013). Jack Nicklaus's best result was a semifinal loss.

The equivalent competition for girls is the U.S. Girls' Junior Championship.

== Winners ==
Year	Winner	Score	Runner-up	Venue
2026	(United States) Noah Maclauchlan	6 & 5	(United States) Miles Russell	Saucon Valley Country Club (PA)
2025	(United States) Hamilton Coleman	2 & 1	(Vietnam) Nguyen Anh Minh	Trinity Forest Golf Club (TX)
2024	(United States) Trevor Gutschewski	4 & 3	(United States) Tyler Watts	Oakland Hills Country Club (MI)
2023	(United States) Bryan Kim	2 up	(New Zealand) Joshua Bai	Daniel Island Club (SC)
2022	(China) Ding Wenyi	3 & 2	(United States) Caleb Surratt	Bandon Dunes Golf Resort (OR)
2021	(United States) Nick Dunlap	3 & 2	(United States) Cohen Trolio	Country Club of North Carolina, Dogwood Course (NC)
2020	Canceled due to the COVID-19 pandemic			
2019	(United States) Preston Summerhays	2 & 1	(China) Jin Bo	Inverness Club (OH)
2018	(United States) Michael Thorbjornsen	1 up	(United States) Akshay Bhatia	Baltusrol Golf Club, Upper Course (NJ)
2017	(United States) Noah Goodwin	1 up	(United States) Matthew Wolff	Flint Hills National Golf Club (KS)
2016	(Australia) Min Woo Lee	2 & 1	(United States) Noah Goodwin	Honors Course (TN)
2015	(United States) Philip Barbaree	37 holes	(United States) Andrew Orischak	Colleton River Plantation Club, Dye Course (SC)
2014	(United States) Will Zalatoris	5 & 3	(United States) Davis Riley	The Club at Carlton Woods, Nicklaus Course (TX)
2013	(United States) Scottie Scheffler	3 & 2	(United States) Davis Riley	Martis Camp (CA)
2012	(South Korea) Andy Hyeon Bo Shim	4 & 3	(United States) Jim Liu	The Golf Club of New England (NH)
2011	(United States) Jordan Spieth (2)	6 & 5	(United States) Chelso Barrett	Gold Mountain Golf Club, Olympic Course (WA)
2010	(United States) Jim Liu	4 & 2	(United States) Justin Thomas	Egypt Valley Country Club (MI)
2009	(United States) Jordan Spieth	4 & 3	(United States) Jay Hwang	Trump National Golf Club, Old and New Courses (NJ)
2008	(United States) Cameron Peck	10 & 8	(United States) Evan Beck	Shoal Creek Golf and Country Club (AL)
2007	(United States) Cory Whitsett	8 & 7	(United States) Anthony Paollucci	Boone Valley Golf Club (MO)
2006	(United States) Philip Francis	3 & 2	(Canada) Richard T. Lee	Rancho Santa Fe Golf Club (CA)
2005	(United States) Kevin Tway	3 & 2	(United States) Brad Johnson	Longmeadow Country Club (MA)
2004	(South Korea) Sihwan Kim	1 up	(United States) David Chung	The Olympic Club (CA)
2003	(United States) Brian Harman	5 & 4	(United States) Jordan Cox	Columbia Country Club (MD)
2002	(United States) Charlie Beljan	20 holes	(United States) Zac Reynolds	Atlanta Athletic Club, Highlands Course (GA)
2001	(United States) Henry Liaw	2 & 1	(Canada) Richard Scott	Oak Hills Country Club (TX)
2000	(United States) Matthew Rosenfeld	3 & 2	(United States) Ryan Moore	Pumpkin Ridge Golf Club, Ghost Creek Course (OR)
1999	(United States) Hunter Mahan	4 & 2	(Colombia) Camilo Villegas	Country Club of York (PA)
1998	(United States) James Oh	1 up	(Australia) Aaron Baddeley	Conway Farms Golf Club (IL)
1997	(United States) Jason Allred	1 up	(South Africa) Trevor Immelman	Aronimink Golf Club (PA)
1996	(United States) Shane McMenamy	19 holes	(United States) Charles Howell III	Forest Highlands Golf Club (AZ)
1995	(United States) D. Scott Hailes	1 up	(United States) James Driscoll	Fargo Country Club (ND)
1994	(South Korea) Terry Noe	2 up	(United States) Andy Barnes	Echo Lake Country Club (NJ)
1993	(United States) Tiger Woods (3)	19 holes	(United States) Ryan Armour	Waverley Country Club (OR)
1992	(United States) Tiger Woods (2)	1 up	(United States) Mark Wilson	Wollaston Golf Club (MA)
1991	(United States) Tiger Woods	19 holes	(United States) Brad Zwetschke	Bay Hill Club and Lodge (FL)
1990	(United States) Mathew Todd	1 up	(United States) Dennis Hillman	Lake Merced Golf Club (CA)
1989	(United States) David Duval	1 up	(United States) Austin Maki	Singing Hills Golf and Country Club (CA)
1988	(United States) Jason Widener	1 up	(United States) Brandon Knight	Yale Golf Course (CT)
1987	(United States) Brett Quigley	1 up	(United States) Bill Heim	Singletree Golf Club (CO)
1986	(United States) Brian Montgomery	2 & 1	(United States) Nicky Goetze	Muirfield Village (OH)
1985	(United States) Charlie Rymer	19 holes	(United States) Gregory Lesher	Brookfield Country Club (NY)
1984	(United States) Doug Martin	4 & 2	(United States) Brad Agee	Wayzata Country Club (MN)
1983	(United States) Tim Straub	1 up	(United States) John Mahon	Saucon Valley Country Club, Old Course (PA)
1982	(United States) Rich Marik	4 & 3	(United States) Tim Straub	Crooked Stick Golf Club (IN)
1981	(United States) Scott Erickson	4 & 3	(United States) Matt McCarley	Sunnyside Country Club (CA)
1980	(United States) Eric Johnson	4 & 3	(New Zealand) Bruce Soulsby	Pine Lake Country Club (MI)
1979	(United States) Jack Larkin	1 up	(United States) Billy Tuten	Moss Creek Golf Club (SC)
1978	(United States) Donald Hurter	21 holes	(United States) Keith Banes	Wilmington Country Club, South Course (DE)
1977	(United States) Willie Wood	4 & 3	(United States) David Games	Ohio State University Golf Club, Scarlet Course (OH)
1976	(United States) Madden Hatcher III	3 & 2	(United States) Doug Clarke	Hiwan Golf Club (CO)
1975	(United States) Brett Mullin	2 & 1	Scott Templeton	Richland Country Club (TN)
1974	(United States) David Nevatt	4 & 3	Mark Tinder	Brooklawn Country Club (CT)
1973	(United States) Jack Renner	20 holes	(United States) Mike Brannan	Singing Hills Country Club (CA)
1972	(United States) Bob Byman	2 & 1	(United States) Scott Simpson	Brookhaven Country Club (TX)
1971	(United States) Mike Brannan	4 & 3	Robert Steele	Manor Country Club (MD)
1970	(United States) Gary Koch	8 & 6	(United States) Mike Nelms	Athens Country Club (GA)
1969	(United States) Aly Trompas	3 & 1	(United States) Eddie Pearce	Spokane Country Club (WA)
1968	(United States) Eddie Pearce	6 & 5	W.B. Harman Jr.	The Country Club (MA)
1967	(United States) John T. Crooks	2 & 1	(United States) Andy North	Twin Hills Golf & Country Club (OK)
1966	(United States) Gary Sanders	2 up	(United States) Ray Leach	California Country Club (CA)
1965	(United States) James Masserio	3 & 2	(United States) Lloyd Liebler	Wilmington Country Club, South Course (DE)
1964	(United States) Johnny Miller	2 & 1	(Mexico) Enrique Sterling Jr.	Eugene Country Club (OR)
1963	(United States) Gregg McHatton	4 & 3	Richard Bland	Florence Country Club (SC)
1962	(United States) Jim Wiechers	4 & 3	James Sullivan	Lochmoor Club (MI)
1961	(United States) Charles S. McDowell	2 up	(United States) Jay Sigel	Cornell University Golf Club (NY)
1960	(United States) William L. Tindall	2 & 1	Robert L. Hammer	Milburn Golf & Country Club (KS)
1959	(United States) Larry J. Lee	2 up	Michael V. McMahon	Stanford University Golf Course (CA)
1958	(United States) Gordon Baker	2 & 1	R. Douglas Lindsay	University of Minnesota Golf Club (MN)
1957	(United States) Larry Beck	6 & 5	David C. Leon	Manor Country Club (MD)
1956	(United States) Harlan Stevenson	3 & 1	(United States) Jack Rule Jr.	Taconic Golf Club (MA)
1955	(United States) Billy J. "Cotton" Dunn	3 & 2	William J. Seanor	Purdue University Golf Club, South Course (IN)
1954	(United States) Foster Bradley Jr.	3 & 1	(United States) Al Geiberger	Los Angeles Country Club, North Course (CA)
1953	(United States) Rex Baxter	2 & 1	(United States) George Warren III	Southern Hills Country Club (OK)
1952	(United States) Donald M. Bisplinghoff	2 up	Eddie M. Meyerson	Yale Golf Course (CT)
1951	(United States) Tommy Jacobs	4 & 2	(United States) Floyd Addington	University of Illinois Golf Club (IL)
1950	(United States) Mason Rudolph	2 & 1	Charles Beville	Denver Country Club (CO)
1949	(United States) Gay Brewer	6 & 4	(United States) Mason Rudolph	Congressional Country Club (MD)
1948	(United States) Dean Lind	4 & 2	(United States) Ken Venturi	University of Michigan Golf Club (MI)

== Multiple winners ==
- 3 wins: Tiger Woods
- 2 wins: Jordan Spieth

== Future sites ==
Year	Edition	Course	Location	Dates
2027	79th	Chambers Bay	University Place, Washington	July 19–24
2028	80th	Woodmont Country Club	Rockville, Maryland	July 17–22
2029	81st	Sand Valley Resort	Nekoosa, Wisconsin	July 23–28
2030	82nd	Colorado Golf Club	Parker, Colorado	July 22–27
2032	84th	Pinehurst Resort	Pinehurst, North Carolina	July 19–24
2033	85th	Whistling Straits	Kohler, Wisconsin	July 25–30
2035	87th	Ridgewood Country Club	Paramus, New Jersey	TBD
2036	88th	Sunriver Resort (Crosswater Course)	Sunriver, Oregon	July 21–26

- Erin Hills is slated to host in 2039.
- Bandon Dunes Golf Resort is slated to host in 2045.
