= Brooklawn Country Club =

Private country club in Fairfield, Connecticut

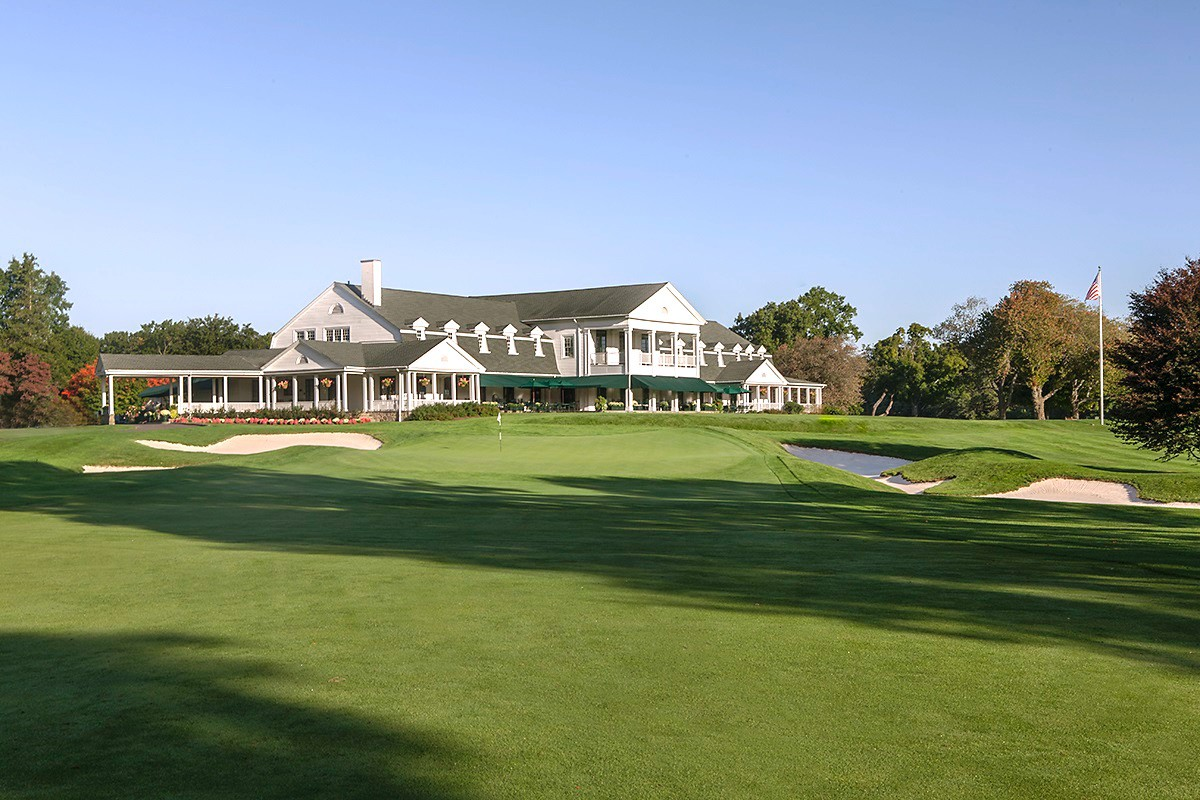

- Location within Connecticut
- 41°11′11″N 73°13′33″W

Club information
- Location: 500 Algonquin Road, Fairfield, Connecticut
- Established: 1895
- Type: Private
- Tota holes: 18
- Tournaments: Connecticut Open: 1935, 1938, 1958, 1973, 1991, 2011; New England Amateur: 1954, 1984; U.S. Junior Amateur: 1974; U.S. Women's Open: 1979; U.S. Senior Open: 1987; Connecticut Amateur: 2001; U.S. Girls' Junior: 2003; U.S. Senior Women's Open: 2021
- Website: Brooklawn Country Club
- Designed by: A.W. Tillinghast
- Par: 71
- Length: 6,711 yards (6,137 m)
- Course rating: 73.3

Brooklawn Country Club is a private country club in Fairfield, Connecticut. Founded in 1895, Brooklawn became one of the earliest members of the United States Golf Association (USGA) when it was admitted on January 22, 1896. Sited on the property's highest point, the club's 57,667-square-foot clubhouse was opened in 1916.

Brooklawn's championship golf course traces to a nine-hole layout, designed by members shortly after the club's founding. In 1899, the first professional hired by the club was Tom Morris, the great nephew of Old Tom Morris, and the grandson of Old Tom's brother George, who laid out the links at Hoylake (now Royal Liverpool) in 1869. In 1911, the acquisition of additional property enabled the course to expand to 18 holes. In 1930, the course was completely redesigned by the noted architect A.W. Tillinghast, and it continues to undergo improvements under the direction of architect Ron Forse. Brooklawn has hosted five USGA championships:

- 1974 U.S. Junior Amateur (won by David Nevatt)
- 1979 U.S. Women's Open (won by Jerilyn Britz)
- 1987 U.S. Senior Open (won by Gary Player)
- 2003 U.S. Girls' Junior (won by Sukjin-Lee Wuesthoff)
- 2021 U.S. Senior Women's Open (won by Annika Sörenstam)

The course was scheduled to host the 2020 U.S. Senior Women's Open, but it was canceled because of the pandemic, but was held in 2021.

Several widely recognized golfers have been associated with the club. One of the early champions in women's golf, member Georgianna Bishop, won the 1904 U.S. Women's Amateur at Merion Golf Club in Ardmore, Pennsylvania. Gene Sarazen, one of only five golfers to have won all the current major championships and inventor of the sand wedge, was assistant golf professional before emerging on the national stage. He still holds the course record (63). In 1943, Sarazen presented a collection of his championship medals, including major tournaments and the Ryder Cup, to the club, which subsequently donated them to the USGA Museum in Far Hills, New Jersey. Julius Boros, a Fairfield native, is an honorary member of the club and played frequently at Brooklawn, stunning the gallery with a hole-in-one at the second hole during an exhibition match in 1961. President William Howard Taft was also an honorary member.

Brooklawn's golf course measures 6,711 yards, is rated at 73.3 and plays to a slope of 138. In addition to the golf course, club facilities include a practice tee and putting green; a tennis center with seven Har-Tru courts and clubhouse; three platform tennis courts and warming hut; and a swimming pool with casual dining facilities. The clubhouse includes a bowling center with eight lanes; men's and women's locker rooms; golf pro shop; dining room; grill room; living room; ball room; private dining and meeting spaces; and a wrap-around porch overlooking the course for outdoor dining and social events.

== Notable golfers who have played Brooklawn ==
Willie Anderson won the inaugural Brooklawn Open in July 1903, the day after he won his second of four US Opens, and first of three in a row, at Baltusrol. Also present was Alex Smith, winner of two US Opens. Renowned golfers Harry Vardon and Ted Ray played two exhibition matches at Brooklawn during their tour of the US in 1920. The matches took place on October 24 just two months after Ted Ray had won the US Open at the Inverness Club in Toledo, OH. and Harry Vardon, at age 50, had finished tie second after leading for most of the tournament. The matches at Brooklawn consisted of 18 holes match play in the morning against Mr W. Parker Seeley and Jesse Sweetzer. The British pair won 3 & 2. In the afternoon the two Jersey islanders beat George Sparling and Al Cuici 5 & 4. In that second match Harry Vardon shot a score of 71. It was reported in the Bridgeport Times & Evening Farmer newspaper of October 25, 1920 that some 500 spectators were in attendance to witness the crack British pair.

Francis Ouimet played in a team match at Brooklawn the same year. In separate events three years later, Gene Sarazen and Jock Hutchison appeared in a four-ball match and Walter Hagen and Australian Joe Kirkwood, Sr. played against Brooklawn professional George Sparling and his partner. After the redesign by Tillinghast, there was a grand opening of the new course on June 30, 1932, starring Gene Sarazen, just five days after he won the US Open at Fresh Meadow. Also present was Billy Burke, 1931 Open winner, Leo Diegel, winner of the 1928 and 1929 PGA, and Henry Ciuci, touring pro and the younger brother of Al Ciuci, who was the pro that introduced Sarazen to Brooklawn's George Sparling. Numerous notable golfers competed in the U.S. Women's Open and the U.S. Senior Open when those events were played at Brooklawn. Competitors in the former included Nancy Lopez, Kathy Whitworth, JoAnne Carner and Pat Bradley (golfer), while the latter included Arnold Palmer, Billy Casper, Chi-Chi Rodríguez and Gene Littler in addition to the winner Gary Player.

Among contestants in the U.S. Junior Amateur were Payne Stewart and Chip Beck. Among those playing in the U.S. Junior Girls' Championship were Inbee Park, Michelle Wie, Morgan Pressel, Brittany Lang and Paula Creamer.
