= Yale Golf Course =

Golf course in New Haven, Connecticut, United States; home of the Yale Golf Teams

Coordinates: 41°19′10″N 72°59′10″W

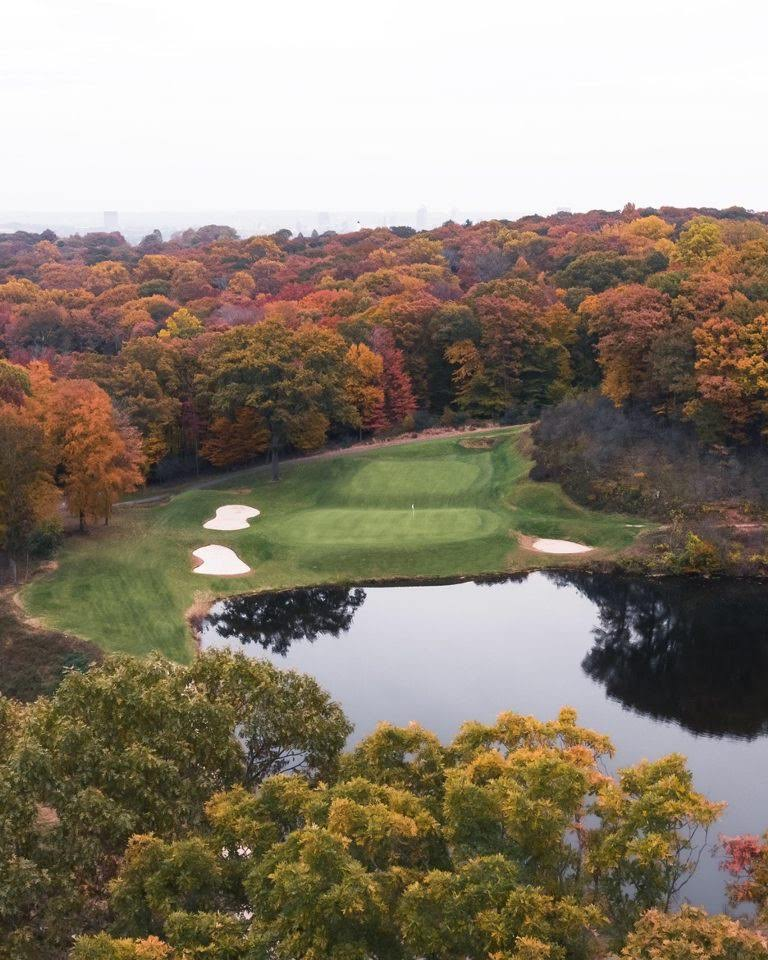
- The 9th hole
- Interactive map of Yale Golf Course

Club information
- Location: New Haven, Connecticut, U.S.
- Established: Surveyed 1923, constructed 1924-1925, opened for play April, 1926
- Type: Private
- Owner: Yale University
- Total holes: 18
- Tournaments: Connecticut Open: New Haven Open: New England Amateur: 1972, 2010
- Website: yalegolf.yale.edu
- Designed by: Charles Blair Macdonald and Seth Raynor
- Par: 70
- Length: 6,825 yards (6.241 km)
- Course rating: 72.9
- Slope rating: 135
- Course record: 60, Li Wang (2016 Macdonald Cup)

The Yale Golf Course, or Yale University Golf Course, is a golf course in New Haven, Connecticut, owned and operated by Yale University. The course is the varsity facility for the men's and women's Yale Golf Teams and hosts three collegiate invitational tournaments each year. The course is primarily open to university students, alumni, and the university community.

== History ==
In October 1895, Yale students began playing the at New Haven Golf Club in the city’s Newhallville neighborhood. That course expanded to 18 holes in 1899 and was home to the students and team until 1910, when the course was developed into housing. Some Yale students subsequently joined the new Race Brook Country Club in Orange, Connecticut, but it was relatively far away and not convenient to campus.

In 1922, Yale Athletic Advisory Committee member George Adee, a noted athlete in the Class of 1895, advanced a proposal to the Yale Athletic Association. He described the current students’ enthusiasm for golf and frustration, and noted that Princeton University already had a university golf course while Harvard University had begun talking about building one of its own. Adee's proposed to ask Sarah Wey Tompkins, the widow of Ray Tompkins, to purchase and donate a plot of land on which Yale could build a course of its own. Ray Tompkins was a Yale football captain in 1882 and 1883. Tompkins had become wealthy while serving as the president of the Chemung Canal Trust Company in New York. Upon his death in 1918, Tompkins left his Sarah more than $1 million. However, in his will existed a provision that upon the death of his wife the remainder of his wealth would be given to Yale "to furnish facilities for extending and developing the practice of athletic exercises on the part of students of the University." In 1923, following Adee's proposal, Yale approached Sarah Tompkins in hopes that she would purchase a plot of land known of the Greist Estate and donate it to the University. She accepted without hesitation and the 720 acres (290 ha) was purchased for $375,000.

After the donation of the Griest Estate by Sarah Tompkins, a Yale Golf Committee was formed. With George Adee as its first chairman and J.F. Byers and Jess Sweetser on the committee, they contacted golf course architect Charles Blair Macdonald to confirm the possibility of having a golf course on the estate. Upon viewing the property and seeing its potential, Macdonald agreed to serve as a consultant to the project. Macdonald pushed for the hiring of a former associate of his, Seth Raynor, to be the course architect. Raynor was paid $7,500 to complete the project and began surveying the land in the summer of 1923.

To fund the golf course, the Board of Control of the Yale Athletic Association reached out to alums with the opportunity to become either a patron of the Ray Tompkins Memorial, a founder, or a member of the Yale Golf Club. To become a patron, one would have to pay $1000 but would be granted, “all privileges of the Ray Tompkins Memorial, including unrestricted lifetime use of the Yale Golf Course, and the option to make during lifetime one transfer of his rights, subject to the approval of the Board of Control.” Some of the alums who supported became patrons include Edwin Herr, George Adee, W. T. Adee, Charles Tiffany, Edward S. Harkness, M.N. Buckner, M.J. Warner, Clarence Blakeslee, Oliver Gould Jennings, J. Frederic Byers, Eben Byers, Charles Merrill, S. Brink Thorne, Julian Curtiss, Henry Havemeyer, Harry Rosenbaum, and S.B. Rosenbaum. Founders of the Yale Golf Club received lifetime use of the course, subject to restriction during the college year based on undergraduate use of the course. Founders within a 25-mile radius of the University paid $750 while those beyond 25 miles paid $500. Members of the Yale Golf Club received use, of course, subject to restrictions during the college year based on undergraduate use of the course. The initiation fee was $250 in addition to annual dues of $40 for those within a 25-mile radius of the university, or $20 for those beyond the 25-mile radius.

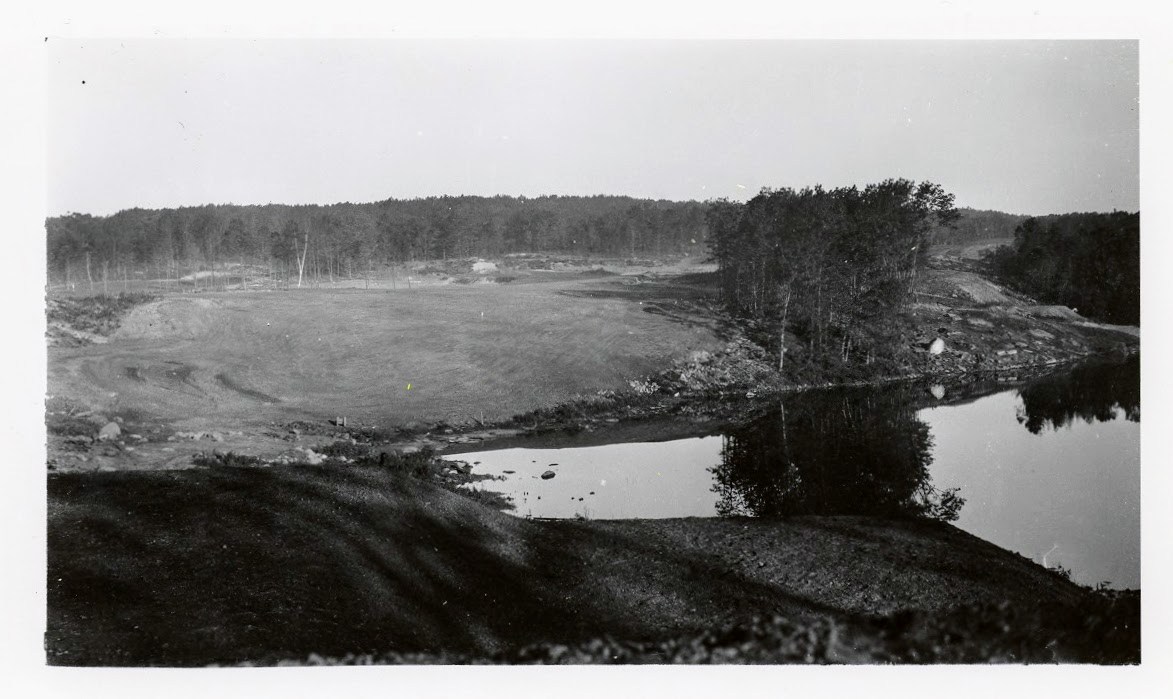
A view from the 1st tee at Yale Golf Course during construction

The clearing of the Griest Estate began during the summer of 1923. The crew had to blast, dig and drain the land that was mostly swampland.

Macdonald described it:

The building of it was a difficult engineering problem. The land was high, heavily wooded, hilly, and no part of it had been cultivated for over forty years. There were no roads or houses upon it. It was a veritable wilderness when given to Yale ... When in the timber one could not see fifty feet ahead, the underbrush was so thick.

In total 120 acres of the estate was made available for the course. Heavier construction began in April 1924. The project initially began with 60 workers and rose to 150 at the height of the project. Although the crew ran into irrigation issues that required 35,000 feet (11 km) of pipes to correct and the project itself ran way over budget, the course officially opened for play on April 15, 1926. Upon opening, the course set up as a 6,552-yard (5.991 km) par 71. The courses' final cost was a then-record $400,000. One reviewer, the legendary sportswriter Herbert Warren Wind, wrote that the Yale Golf Course was, "a back-breaking job over an untouched plot of rugged land whose hazards and greens have the kind of dimensions that one would have expected of Michelangelo."

In 1983, Ben Crenshaw referred to the course as a "national treasure."

In 1994, Yale hired a new Athletic Director, Tom Beckett. He was "shocked" to find the course in such "poor condition." Beckett improved the financial situation of the course, which included an investment program and alumni support base. With the additional funds Yale was able to advance the quality of the course through tree removal, improved irrigation, and regular visits from USGA agronomists. Staffing on the course also increased which "made a tremendous difference in the conditions of the golf course." By 2004, "a restored and beautiful course" had manifested itself.

In 2006, the course was voted the top university golf course in the country. In 2019, the course was ranked #53 in Golfweek's Top 200 Classic Courses. It was also voted Best Campus Course in 2019 by Golfweek. According to the USA Today, it is the "perennial" #1 pick.

== Tournaments hosted ==
Yale Golf Course has hosted many significant golf tournaments. These include significant amateur tournaments like the U.S. Junior Amateur Golf Championship and Connecticut Amateur. In addition, the course has hosted many significant college tournaments including the NCAA Regional Championships, Macdonald Cup, and the Yale Spring Invitational. The course has also hosted some significant professional tournaments. It hosted the Connecticut Open in 1931 and 1981. The course also hosted a Ben Hogan Tour event, New Haven Open, in the early 1990s.

David Patterson, the Scottish-born Yale Bulldogs golf coach during the late 20th century, also helped establish a number of significant tournaments at Yale Golf Course during his tenure. These included the 1988 USGA National Junior Championship, 1991 and 1995 NCAA Regional Championships, 1995 World Special Olympics Golf Championship, and the Yale Golf Classic, a senior event.

Like many courses, the course has a club championship. Reverend William T. Lee, who won the Connecticut Amateur three times, has won the club championship 11 times.

In 2004, the course hosted the NCAA Eastern Regional tournament. Bill Haas, from Wake Forest University, won the tournament at two-under-par.

== Scorecard ==
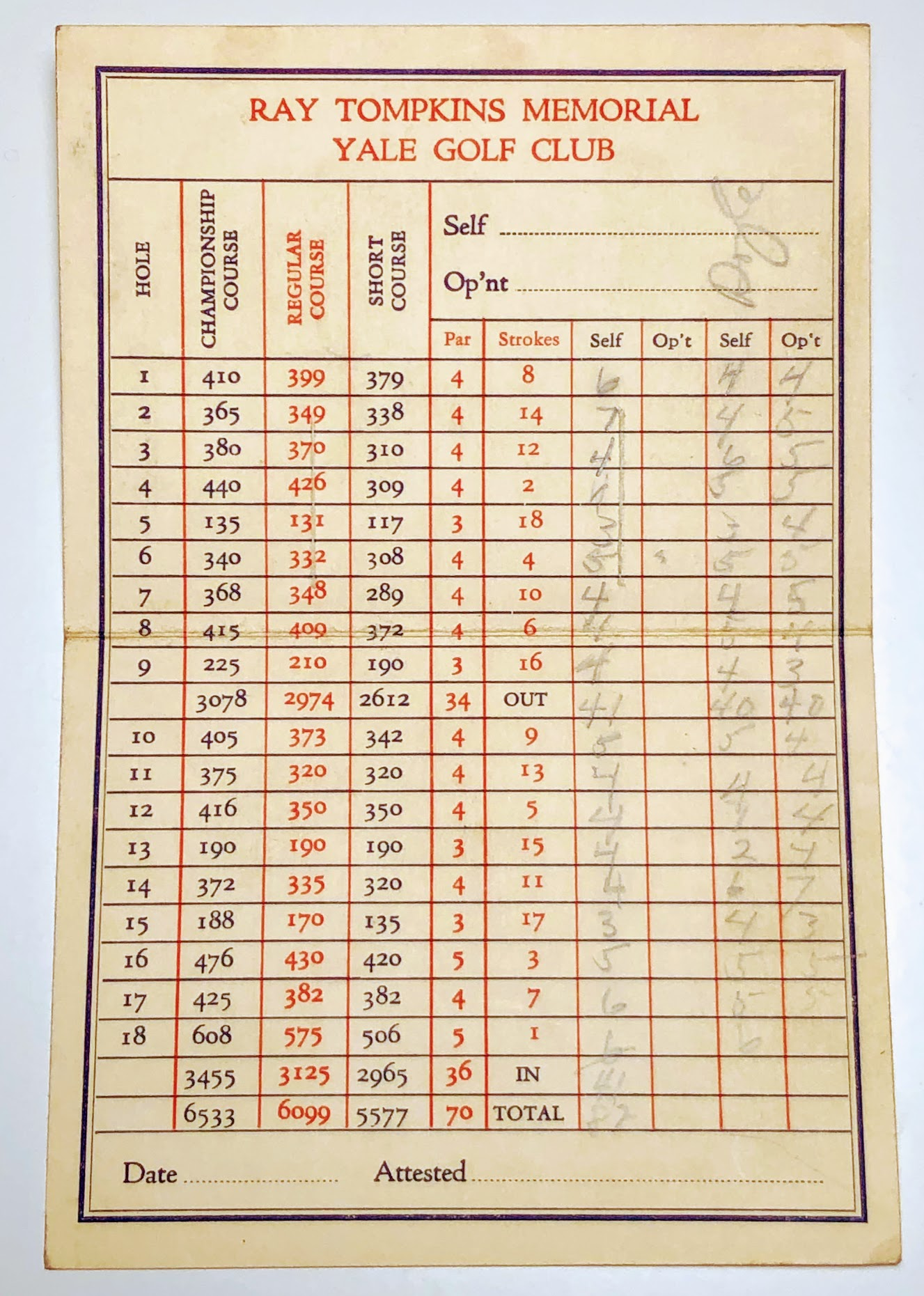
A 1926 Yale Golf Course Scorecard

Yale Golf Course
Tee	Rating/Slope	1	2	3	4	5	6	7	8	9	Out	10	11	12	13	14	15	16	17	18	In	Total
Par		4	4	4	4	3	4	4	4	3	34	4	4	4	3	4	3	5	4	5	36	70
SI		3	13	7	1	17	15	11	9	5		2	14	8	10	12	18	16	4	6
Championship	M: 72.9 / 135 W: 79.6 / 146	420	374	411	437	160	421	377	406	213	3,219	396	379	400	230	365	225	553	437	621	3,606	6,825
Long (blue)	M: 71.3 / 133 W: 77.1 / 140	383	362	399	425	135	409	365	394	201	3,074	382	347	387	196	353	171	495	425	580	3,335	6,409
Regular (green)	M: 69.3 / 130 W: 75.8 / 137	340	344	379	410	135	349	350	382	201	2,874	356	334	343	192	342	141	465	395	542	3,110	5,984
Short (gold)	M: 65.4 / 114 W: 70.2 / 121	310	280	332	344	115	317	288	328	165	2,479	235	303	318	182	331	126	435	255	480	2,665	5,144
SI	(Short)	9	11	1	3	17	13	15	7	5		6	10	2	8	12	18	14	16	4
