= Rhode Island Country Club =

Country club in Barrington, Rhode Island

Coordinates: 41.730657°N 71.330052°W

Rhode Island Country Club (RICC) is a private country club located in Barrington, Rhode Island. It includes a golf course designed in 1911 by Donald Ross and overlooks the Narrangansett Bay near the intersection of Nayatt Road and Middle Highway.

Each June the country club hosts the CVS Caremark Charity Classic, hosted by club member and PGA Tour player Brad Faxon.

== History ==
RICC was founded in 1911 by a group of Providence businessmen, and originally consisted of a golf course designed by Donald Ross and a small clubhouse. In 1950, the main clubhouse caught fire, burning down to the basement. In the aftermath of the fire, the club expanded, building a swimming pool in 1955 and opening women's activities during the 1950s. The club played a role in introducing Barrington to New England sports fans.
