= New Haven Open =

Golf tournament

Nike Connecticut Open
Tournament information
- Location: New Haven, Connecticut
- Established: 1990
- Course: Yale Golf Course
- Par: 70
- Tour: Nike Tour
- Format: Stroke play
- Prize fund: US$150,000
- Month played: June
- Final year: 1993

Tournament record score
- Aggregate: 198 Jon Christian (1992)
- To par: −12 as above

Final champion
- (United States) Dave Stockton Jr.
- Location in the United States Location in Connecticut

The New Haven Open was a golf tournament on the Nike Tour. It ran from 1990 to 1993. It was played at the Yale Golf Course in New Haven, Connecticut.

== Winners ==
Year	Winner	Score	To par	Margin of victory	Runner-up
Nike Connecticut Open
1993	(United States) Dave Stockton Jr.	204	−6	1 stroke	(United States) Jeff Coston
Ben Hogan Connecticut Open
1992	(United States) Jon Christian	198	−12	7 strokes	(United States) Jeff Coston
1991	(United States) Mike Holland	199	−11	4 strokes	(United States) P. H. Horgan III
Ben Hogan New Haven Open
1990	(United States) Jim McGovern	201	−9	3 strokes	(United States) Tray Tyner
