= Metacomet Country Club =

Private golf club in East Providence, Rhode Island

- The 10th at Metacomet

- Location within Rhode Island Location within the United States
- 41°48′25″N 71°22′48″W

Club information
- Location: East Providence, Rhode Island, United States
- Established: 1901
- Type: private
- Designed by: Donald Ross

Metacomet Country Club was a private golf club in East Providence, Rhode Island in the United States. It was incorporated in 1901 by five Rhode Island businessmen. The playing grounds were, at that time, in the Rumford section of East Providence.

The club's name derived from the fashion at the turn of the 20th century for golf clubs organizing in New England to select Native American names. Metacomet was a great Indian Chief of the Wampanoag tribe, a friend of the Pilgrim settlers of the 17th century who was later named King Philip by the English after he succeeded his father as leader of the tribe.

The course was originally designed by Leonard Byles, but in 1924 Donald Ross was hired to re-design the golf course into the layout which now exists. The new layout was opened on August 7, 1926. Known as a challenging course with lots of character, it is widely considered to have putting greens among the best in New England.

On September 30, 2020, Golf Digest reported that the club, recently purchased by Marshall Properties, was closing, as Marshall had failed to obtain a necessary zoning change needed to keep the club operating.
