= J. J. Henry =

American professional golfer (born 1975)

Personal information
- Full name: Ronald Henry III
- Nationality: United States
- Born: April 2, 1975 (age 51) Fairfield, Connecticut, U.S.
- Height: 6 ft 3 in (1.91 m)
- Weight: 200 lb (91 kg; 14 st)
- Spouse: Lee Henry

Career
- Sport: Golf
- College: Texas Christian University
- Turned professional: 1998
- Current tours: PGA Tour (past champion status)
- Professional wins: 5
- Highest ranking: 58 (January 7, 2007)

Number of wins by tour
- PGA Tour: 3
- Korn Ferry Tour: 1
- Other: 1

Best results in major championships
- Masters Tournament: T37: 2007
- PGA Championship: T40: 2013
- U.S. Open: T26: 2007
- The Open Championship: T27: 2007

Ronald "J.J." Henry III (born April 2, 1975) is an American professional golfer who plays on the PGA Tour.

== Early life and amateur career ==
Henry was born in Fairfield, Connecticut. While attending Texas Christian University, he was the individual runner up at the 1998 NCAA Division I Men's Golf Championships.

== Professional career ==
Henry turned pro in 1998. He joined the Nationwide Tour in 1999 and after winning the 2000 Buy.com Knoxville Open moved up to the PGA Tour in 2001. His first PGA Tour win came in 2006 at the Buick Championship. He played on the 2006 Ryder Cup team, halving all three matches he was involved in.

Henry came close at the 2012 Byron Nelson Championship where he had one-shot lead with two holes to play. A double bogey on the 71st hole resulted in him eventually finishing two strokes behind winner Jason Dufner. Later in the year, Henry won for the second time on the PGA Tour at the Reno–Tahoe Open. The event used the modified Stableford scoring system and Henry prevailed by one point over Brazilian Alexandre Rocha. He earned entry into the PGA Championship the following week.

After finishing 158th in the 2018 FedEx Cup, Henry became the first player to take advantage of a one-time PGA Tour exemption for those who made at least 300 cuts, six priority positions higher than the past champions category.

== Personal life ==
Henry lives with his wife Lee and his two children in Fort Worth, Texas.

In 2006, Henry founded the Henry House Foundation, a non-profit organization with a mission to generate public awareness and to support community-based programs that focus on the healthcare and well-being of children in the community. The foundation makes donations to fund specific, tangible projects initiated by children's medical and support services and organizations in Fort Worth and Southern New England.

== Awards and honors ==
In 2015, Henry was inducted into the Connecticut Golf Hall of Fame.

== Amateur wins ==
- 1994 Connecticut Amateur
- 1995 Connecticut Amateur
- 1998 New England Amateur, Connecticut Amateur

== Professional wins (5) ==
=== PGA Tour wins (3) ===
No.	Date	Tournament	Winning score	Margin of victory	Runner(s)-up
1	Jul 2, 2006	Buick Championship	−14 (68-68-63-67=266)	3 strokes	(United States) Hunter Mahan, (United States) Ryan Moore
2	Aug 5, 2012	Reno–Tahoe Open	43 pts (10-12-14-7=43)	1 point	(Brazil) Alexandre Rocha
3	Aug 9, 2015	Barracuda Championship (2)	47 pts (13-11-17-6=47)	Playoff	(United States) Kyle Reifers

PGA Tour playoff record (1–0)

No.	Year	Tournament	Opponent	Result
1	2015	Barracuda Championship	(United States) Kyle Reifers	Won with eagle on second extra hole

=== Buy.com Tour wins (1) ===
No.	Date	Tournament	Winning score	Margin of victory	Runners-up
1	May 7, 2000	Buy.com Knoxville Open	−15 (67-67-66-73=273)	1 stroke	(United States) Tripp Isenhour, (United States) Spike McRoy, (United States) Gene Sauers, (United States) Chris Smith

=== Other wins (1) ===
No.	Date	Tournament	Winning score	Margin of victory	Runners-up
1	Jun 19, 2007	CVS Caremark Charity Classic (with (United States) Stewart Cink)	−20 (60-62=122)	1 stroke	(United States) Brad Faxon and (United States) Zach Johnson

== Results in major championships ==
Tournament	2002	2003	2004	2005	2006	2007	2008	2009	2010	2011	2012	2013	2014	2015	2016
Masters Tournament						T37									
U.S. Open			64	57	CUT	T26		CUT	CUT	T54					CUT
The Open Championship					CUT	T27									
PGA Championship	63				41	CUT	CUT	T63		CUT	T42	T40		T72	

Did not play

CUT = missed the half-way cut
"T" = tie

=== Summary ===
Tournament	Wins	2nd	3rd	Top-5	Top-10	Top-25	Events	Cuts made
Masters Tournament	0	0	0	0	0	0	1	1
U.S. Open	0	0	0	0	0	0	8	4
The Open Championship	0	0	0	0	0	0	2	1
PGA Championship	0	0	0	0	0	0	9	6
Totals	0	0	0	0	0	0	20	11

- Most consecutive cuts made – 4 (2006 PGA – 2007 Open Championship)
- Longest streak of top-10s – 0

== Results in The Players Championship ==
Tournament	2002	2003	2004	2005	2006	2007	2008	2009	2010	2011	2012	2013	2014	2015	2016	2017	2018
The Players Championship	CUT	CUT	CUT	CUT	T45	CUT	T42	CUT	T58	CUT	T40	CUT	T48		T28		T67

Did not play

CUT = missed the halfway cut
"T" indicates a tie for a place

== Results in World Golf Championships ==
Tournament	2006	2007	2008
Match Play		R64	
Championship	37	T55	
Invitational	T10	T41	T73

Top 10
Did not play

QF, R16, R32, R64 = Round in which player lost in match play
"T" = Tied

== U.S. national team appearances ==
Amateur

- Palmer Cup: 1998 (tie)

Professional

- Ryder Cup: 2006
- World Cup: 2006

== See also ==
- 2000 Buy.com Tour graduates
- 2014 Web.com Tour Finals graduates
