= New Haven Country Club =

Country club in Hamden, Connecticut

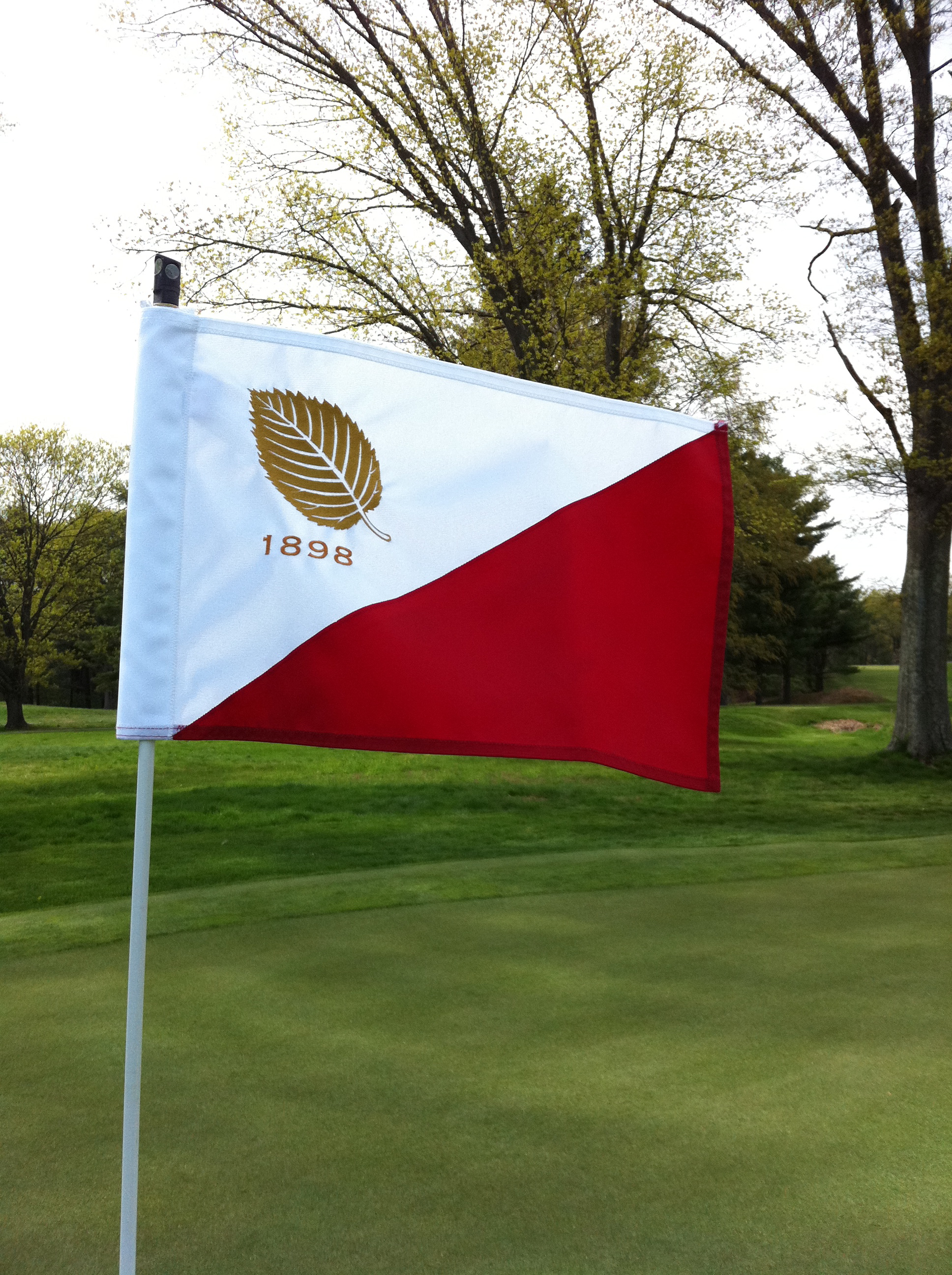

- Location in Connecticut
- 41.349043°N 72.907231°W

Club information
- Location: Hamden, Connecticut
- Established: 1898
- Type: Private
- Total holes: 18
- Tournaments: New England Amateur: 1941, 1998
- Website: newhavencc.com
- Designed by: Willie Park Jr.
- Par: 70
- Length: 6,602 yards
- Course rating: 71.8
- Slope rating: 131
- Course record: 58

New Haven Country Club is a private country club located in Hamden, Connecticut. Founded in 1898 NHCC is one of the oldest golf courses in America. The club was founded as the New Haven Golf Club in downtown New Haven and then moved to newly purchased farmland along Lake Whitney in Hamden later. Notable early members include President William Taft, Walter Camp, Eli Whitney III, Henry Sargent, Frank Bigelow, Winthrop Bushnell, Charles C Claire, and Henry Hotchkiss. The club's PGA Head Golf Professional is William Wallis.

The original golf course was completely redesigned in 1921 by two-time Open Champion Willie Park Jr., incorporating the natural elevation changes of the 110-acre plot. In recent years thousands of trees have been cut down to restore the original vistas of Lake Whitney. New Haven Country Club's distinctively fast and large greens are a defining feature of the course. Del Kinney, the former executive director of the Connecticut State Golf Association remarked, “New Haven [Country Club] is very demanding and sneaky tough, but a very fair test. In fact, it’s the best in the state from the perspective of being both fun to play and challenging.”

== History ==
New Haven Country Club dates its origins to downtown New Haven in the 1890s. Yale University professor Theodore S. Woolsey was instrumental in the development of the nine-hole New Haven Golf Club in 1895 at what is now Albertus Magnus College. Woolsey and other NHGC members desired a new setting as the nine-hole course became overcrowded with Yale students who began to enjoy the newly imported sport. A major provision of the newly established NHCC was that it would allow guest play but not membership to Yale students. Notable Yale-associated members included U.S. President Howard Taft, who taught law at his alma mater, and Yale alumnus Walter Camp, the father of American football. Since the creation of Yale Golf Course the club does not have as strong of a Yale connection, but many members have dual memberships at both courses or work at Yale University.

In the first 17 years of existence, NHCC leased the farmland. However, in 1915 the members voted to buy the land for $80,000.

In the late 20th century NHCC became a much more inclusive and egalitarian club than it was in its first 50 years. The porch off the men's locker room eventually allowed access to female members and the grill room allowed women to dine in 1991. The club's membership became increasingly diverse with Italian, Jewish, and other cultural groups. With the closing of several area country clubs around the Great Recession NHCC absorbed many new golfing members. Today NHCC is more socially, economically, geographically diverse than it has ever been. While members in the first half century mostly lived within a few miles of the club, today they live as far as Fairfield and Hartford Counties.

== Course ==
New Haven Country Club
Tee	Rating/Slope	1	2	3	4	5	6	7	8	9	Out	10	11	12	13	14	15	16	17	18	In	Total
Par		4	3	4	4	4	4	4	4	3	34	5	4	3	4	4	4	4	3	5	36	70
Gold		423	159	394	360	423	403	418	348	173	3101	518	424	192	374	458	388	409	170	568	3501	6602

== Facilities ==
The distinctive clubhouse was modeled after Scottish golf clubhouses of the era. In 1913 Spanish-style red tiles were added to the roof which remain today. Despite renovations to the grille room and dining rooms, the men's locker room, pro shop, and patios retain a historic feel of golf's early days. As a purist's golf club, the primary usage of the club is golf. The large practice green is steps away from the clubhouse with views of the driving range, 9th green, and 18th green. Due to land constraints the driving range has remained an iron-only facility for most accomplished players with a maximum allowed carry distance of approximately 190 yards. Distance-limited balls are available for longer clubs. In 2015 a modern short game practice area was constructed including 2 bunkers and an undulating green for chipping and pitching practice.

Other facilities include an olympic size swimming pool and paddle ball courts.

== Tournaments ==
New Haven Country Club has been selected to host six Connecticut Open Championships, 14 Connecticut Amateur Championships, the New England Amateur, countless USGA and CSGA qualifiers, and the Women's Western Championship. The club is the host of the 2018 Connecticut Open
