= Mystic Cottage =

Historic house in North Carolina, United States

- U.S. National Historic Landmark District – Contributing property
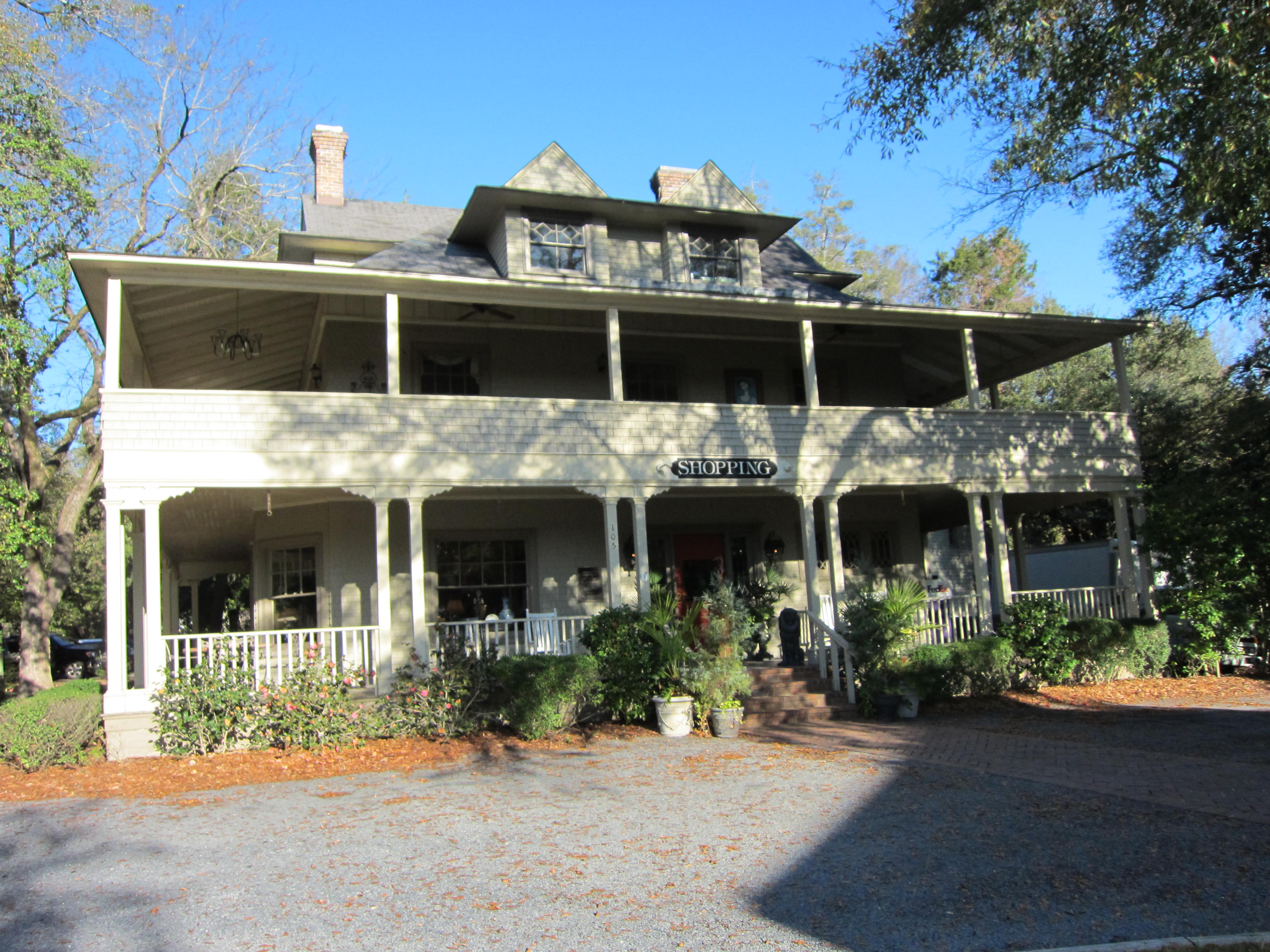

- Location within North Carolina Location within the United States
- Location: 105 Magnolia Road, Pinehurst, North Carolina
- Coordinates: 35.1955°N 79.4704°W
- Built: 1899
- Architect: Taylor Kendall and Boston Stevens
- Part of: Pinehurst Historic District (ID73001361)

Significant dates
- Added to NRHP: August 14, 1973
- Designated {{{NRHP_TYPE2}}}: June 19, 1996

Mystic Cottage is a historic U.S. home located at 105 Magnolia Road, Pinehurst, North Carolina. It was the first home of the Leonard Tufts family in Pinehurst. Tufts took over from father James Walker Tufts and was followed by son Richard Tufts, in running the Pinehurst Resort.

The cottage was described in 1900 as elaborate, with 14 rooms and all the modern improvements. The three-story building has a wrap around porch. The porch was extended to the second story later. It is now used for commercial purposes. The cottage is part of the Pinehurst Historic District, added to the National Register of Historic Places in 1973. The district became a National Historic Landmark District in 1996.
