= Pinehurst Historic District =

Pinehurst Historic District may refer to:

- Pinehurst Historic District (Tuscaloosa, Alabama), Tuscaloosa County, listed on the National Register of Historic Places (NRHP)
- Pinehurst Historic District (Pinehurst, North Carolina), Moore County, NRHP-listed

== See also ==
- Pinehurst (disambiguation)
