= Richard Tufts =

Richard Sise Tufts (March 16, 1896 – December 17, 1980) was a notable figure in American golf in the mid-20th century.

== Early life and education ==
Born in Medford, Massachusetts, he was a grandson of James Walker Tufts, the founder of Pinehurst Resort in North Carolina, which was long America's preeminent golf resort. Richard Tufts grew up in Massachusetts and attended Harvard.

== Career ==
He served in World War I before starting work at Pinehurst with his father Leonard, and later taking over himself. He added 40 holes to the resort and hosted the 1936 PGA Championship and the 1951 Ryder Cup. He ran Pinehurst until relatives sold their stock to Diamondhead Corp., ending family control.

Tufts was a heavyweight of the golfing establishment, eventually rising to be President of the United States Golf Association in 1956-57. Like Bobby Jones, Tufts was a great believer in amateur golf, and had a rather patrician disapproval of any commercialization of the sport. He was non-playing captain of the U.S. team in the Walker Cup amateur team competition in 1963. He also wrote several books about golf.

== Awards and honors ==
In 1992, Tufts was inducted into the World Golf Hall of Fame.

== Gallery ==
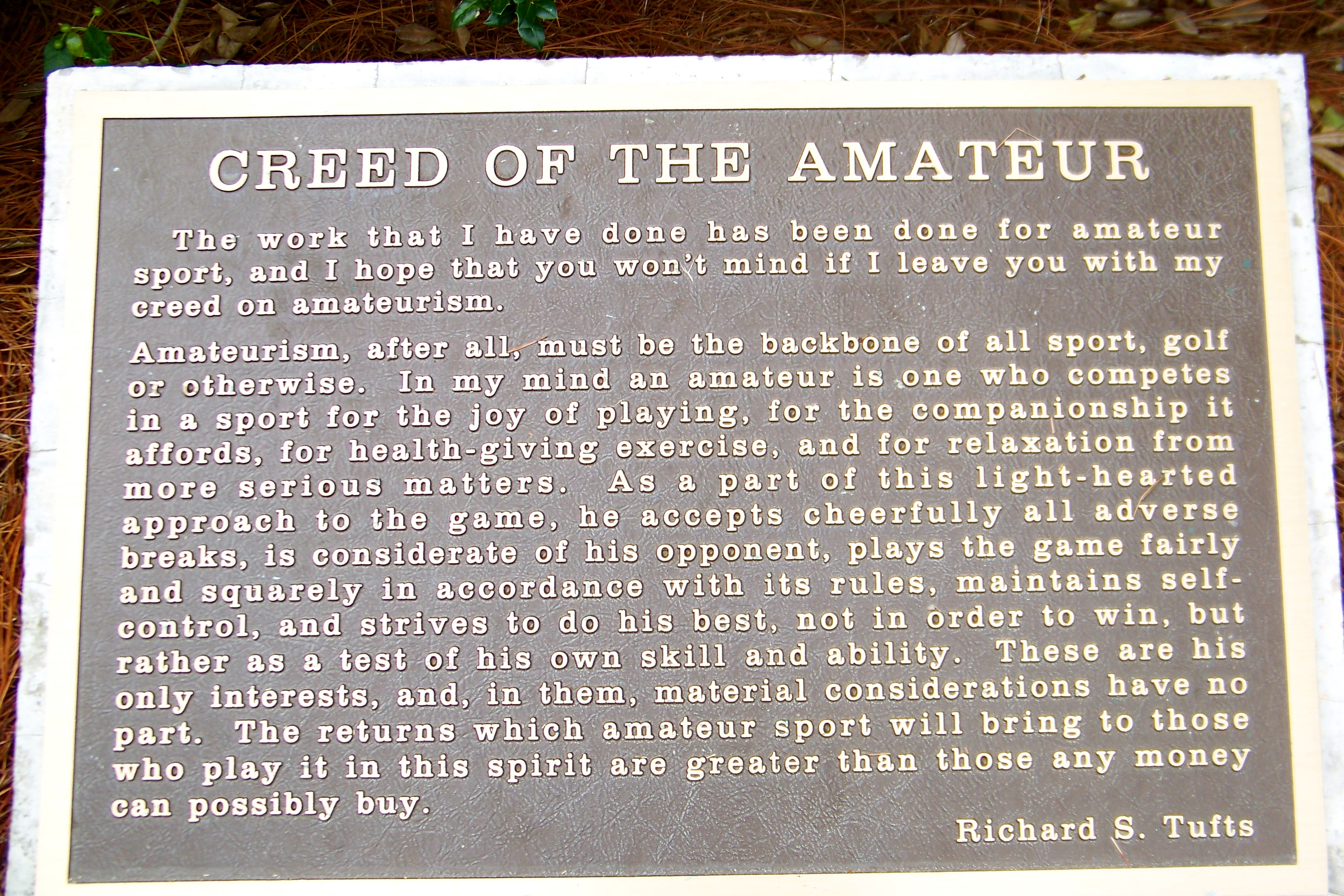
Creed of the Amateur by Richard S. Tufts
