= 1936 PGA Championship =

Coordinates: 35.1895°N 79.4678°W

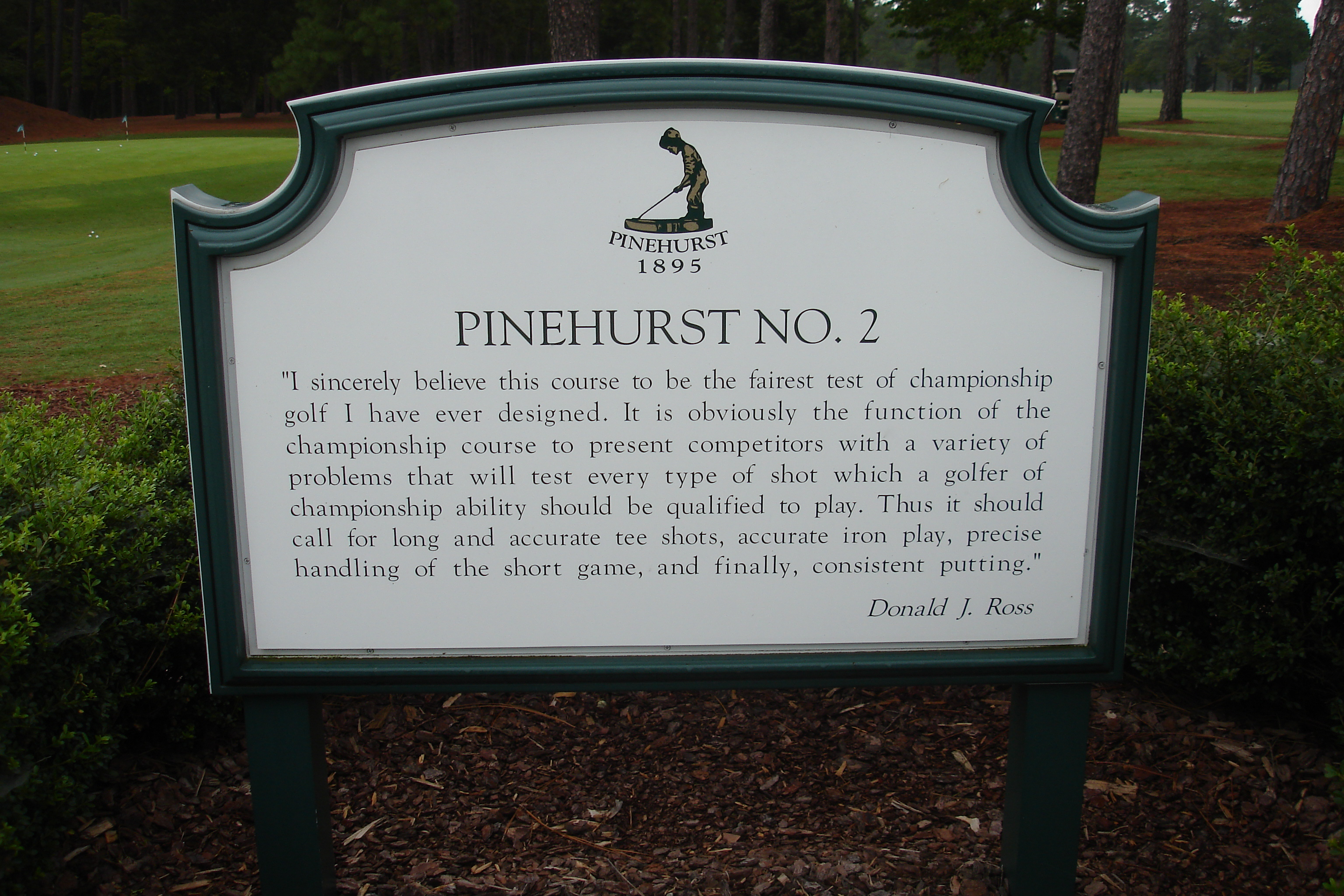

Tournament information
- Dates: November 16–22, 1936
- Location: Pinehurst, North Carolina
- Course(s): Pinehurst Resort; No. 2 Course
- Organized by: PGA of America
- Tour: PGA Tour
- Format: Match play - 6 rounds

Statistics
- Par: 72
- Field: 113 players, 64 to match play
- Cut: 156 (+12), playoff
- Prize fund: $9,200
- Winner's share: $1,000

Champion
- (United States) Denny Shute
- def. Jimmy Thomson, 3 and 2

Location in the United States
Location in North Carolina

The 1936 PGA Championship was the 19th PGA Championship, held November 16–22 at Pinehurst Resort in Pinehurst, North Carolina. Then a match play championship, Denny Shute won the first of his consecutive PGA Championships, defeating Jimmy Thomson 3 and 2 on the No. 2 Course.

It was Shute's second major title; his first was at the British Open in 1933 at St. Andrews. He previously made the finals at the PGA Championship in 1931.

Fay Coleman was the medalist in the stroke play qualifier at 143 (−1). Five-time champion Walter Hagen and two-time winner Leo Diegel both shot 157 (+13), one stroke out of the playoff. Defending champion Johnny Revolta lost in the second round to Harold "Jug" McSpaden in 19 holes.

Shute repeated as champion less than seven months later in May 1937. He was the last to successfully defend his title at the PGA Championship until Tiger Woods won consecutive titles twice, in 1999–2000 and 2006–2007.

This was the first major played at Pinehurst and Course No. 2, which had sand greens until 1935. While the PGA Championship has yet to return, the U.S. Open was held at the course in 1999, 2005, and 2014. It hosted the Ryder Cup in 1951 and the U.S. Women's Open was also here in 2014.

== Format ==
The match play format at the PGA Championship in 1936 called for 12 rounds (216 holes) in seven days:

- Monday and Tuesday – 36-hole stroke play qualifier, 18 holes per day;
  - defending champion Johnny Revolta and top 63 professionals advanced to match play
- Wednesday – first two rounds, 18 holes each
- Thursday – third round – 36 holes
- Friday – quarterfinals – 36 holes
- Saturday – semifinals – 36 holes
- Sunday – final – 36 holes

== Final results ==
Sunday, November 22, 1936

Place	Player	Money ($)
1	(United States) Denny Shute	1,000
2	(United States) Jimmy Thomson	500
T3	(United States) Bill Mehlhorn	250
T3	(United States) Craig Wood	250
T5	(United States) Jimmy Hines	200
T5	(United States) Tony Manero	200
T5	(United States) Harold "Jug" McSpaden	200
T5	(United States) Horton Smith	200

== Final eight bracket ==
Quarter-finals; November 20
Denny Shute	3&2
Horton Smith
Bill Mehlhorn	4&2
Jimmy Hines
Jimmy Thomson	1up
Jug McSpaden
Craig Wood	5&4
Tony Manero

Semi-finals; November 21
Denny Shute	1up
Bill Mehlhorn
Jimmy Thomson	4&3
Craig Wood

Finals; November 22
Denny Shute	3&2
Jimmy Thomson

== Final match scorecards ==
Morning

Hole	1	2	3	4	5	6	7	8	9	10	11	12	13	14	15	16	17	18
Par	4	4	4	5	5	3	4	4	3	5	4	4	4	4	3	5	3	4
Shute	4	5	4	4	5	3	4	5	3	5	5	4	5	4	2	5	3	4
Thomson	5	4	5	6	4	3	4	4	4	5	5	4	4	4	4	5	3	4
Leader	S1	–	S1	S2	S1	S1	S1	–	S1	S1	S1	S1	–	–	S1	S1	S1	S1

Afternoon

Hole	1	2	3	4	5	6	7	8	9	10	11	12	13	14	15	16	17	18
Par	4	4	4	5	5	3	4	4	3	5	4	4	4	4	3	5	3	4
Shute	4	4	4	5	5	3	4	5	2	6	3	4	4	4	3	3	Shute wins 3 & 2	
Thomson	4	5	4	4	5	3	4	4	3	6	4	4	4	4	3	5	Shute wins 3 & 2	
Leader	S1	S2	S2	S1	S1	S1	S1	–	S1	S1	S2	S2	S2	S2	S2	S3	Shute wins 3 & 2	

Eagle	Birdie	Bogey
