= Pinehurst =

Pinehurst may refer to:

== Place names ==
=== Canada ===
- Pinehurst, Nova Scotia, village located outside New Germany
- Pinehurst Lake, lake in northeastern Alberta

=== South Africa ===
- Pinehurst, Western Cape, home belonging to an 'Ostrich Baron'
- Pinehurst, Durbanville, a residential estate in Durbanville, Western Cape.

=== United States ===
- Pinehurst, Georgia
- Pinehurst, Idaho
- Pinehurst, Massachusetts
- Pinehurst, New York
- Pinehurst, North Carolina, a village in Moore County
  - Pinehurst Resort, golf resort
  - Pinehurst Race Track, race track complex
- Pinehurst, Ohio
- Pinehurst, Oregon
  - Pinehurst State Airport
- Pinehurst, Montgomery County, Texas
- Pinehurst, Orange County, Texas
- Pinehurst, Seattle, Washington

== Other ==
- Pinehurst School, school in Auckland, New Zealand
- Pinehurst F.C., a former association football team from England
- Pinehurst System, a pairs playing format in golf
- Gorse Hill and Pinehurst (ward), Wiltshire, England
