= Stephanie Meadow =

Northern Irish professional golfer

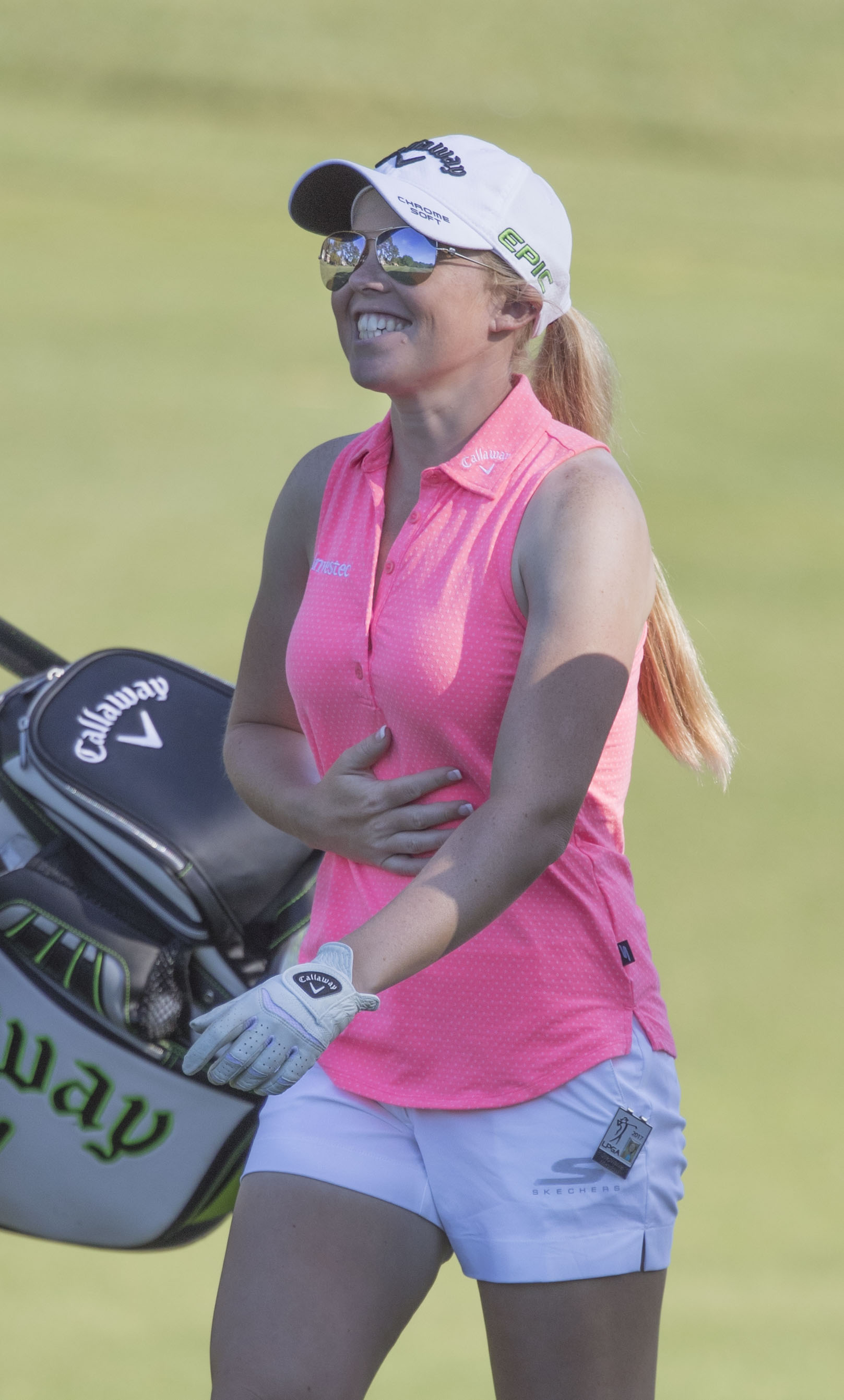

Personal information
- Nationality: Northern Ireland
- Born: 20 January 1992 (age 34) Jordanstown, Northern Ireland
- Height: 5 ft 4 in (163 cm)

Career
- Sport: Golf
- College: University of Alabama
- Turned professional: 2014
- Current tour: LPGA Tour
- Former tour: Symetra Tour
- Professional wins: 2

Number of wins by tour
- Epson Tour: 1
- Other: 1

Best results in LPGA major championships
- Chevron Championship: T19: 2021
- Women's PGA C'ship: T3: 2023
- U.S. Women's Open: 3rd: 2014
- Women's British Open: T39: 2020
- Evian Championship: T29: 2021

Achievements and awards
- Heather Farr Player Award: 2015

Stephanie Meadow (born 20 January 1992) is a Northern Irish professional golfer who played for the University of Alabama and made her professional debut at the 2014 U.S. Women's Open at Pinehurst where she finished third.

== Personal life ==
Meadow married long time boyfriend Kyle Kallan in April 2023.

== Amateur career ==
Meadow won The Women's Amateur Championship in 2012. She appeared for the British and Irish team at the 2012 and 2014 Curtis Cup.

At the University of Alabama, Meadow became the Crimson Tide's first four-time first-team All-American. She left Alabama as the career record holder in most every category. She finished with a 71.89 scoring average, just 0.17 strokes above par per round over her 132 career rounds. Meadow won nine career tournaments - three times more than anyone else in school history, men's or women's - while carding school records with 73 career rounds of par or better, 125 counting rounds (95.5 percent) and 404 birdies.

Meadow was part of the Tide's first NCAA Women's Golf Championship in 2012 and is a recipient of the 2014 Elite 89 Award. She is also the only Southeastern Conference women's golfer to achieve both first team All-American and first team Academic All-American honors in consecutive years.

== Professional career ==
Meadow officially turned professional in 2014 shortly after qualifying for the 2014 U.S. Women's Open and went on to secure 3rd place. This remains her best result at a major championship to date, equalled by joint third in the 2023 Women's PGA Championship. In 2014, she achieved her highest ever position in the Women's World Golf Rankings with number eighty-two.

Meadow represented Ireland at the 2016 Summer Olympics where she finished tied 31st.

Meadow gained an LPGA Tour card for 2017 via the LPGA Final Qualifying Tournament.

Meadow won her first Symetra Tour tournament at the 2018 IOA Championship in a playoff. She finished sixth on the Symetra Tour money list, thus earning her LPGA Tour Card for 2019. In August 2019, she won the World Invitational at Galgorm Castle, Northern Ireland.

At the 2020 Summer Olympics, held in August 2021, she finished 7th.

Meadow came joint third at the 2023 KPMG Women's PGA Championship, receiving the largest ever prize check of her career at $423,070. This pushed her back into the top 100 in the world rankings, into 89th place.

== Professional wins (2) ==
=== Symetra Tour wins (1) ===
No.	Date	Tournament	Winning score	To par	Margin of victory	Runner-up	Winner's share ($)
1	8 Apr 2018	IOA Championship	69-73-70=212	−4	Playoff	(United States) Carleigh Silvers	15,000

Symetra Tour playoff record (1–1)

No.	Year	Tournament	Opponent	Result
1	2018	IOA Championship	(United States) Carleigh Silvers	Won with birdie on first extra hole
2	2018	Danielle Downey Credit Union Classic	(South Korea) Seong Eun-jeong	Lost on fourth extra hole

=== Other wins (1) ===
- 2019 ISPS Handa World Invitational (Women's event)

== Results in LPGA majors ==
Results not in chronological order

Tournament	2011	2012	2013	2014	2015	2016	2017	2018	2019	2020
Chevron Championship			47		T20	CUT				T51
Women's PGA Championship				CUT	CUT		CUT		CUT	CUT
U.S. Women's Open		CUT		3	CUT		CUT		CUT	
The Evian Championship ^										NT
Women's British Open	CUT			CUT	CUT					T39

Tournament	2021	2022	2023	2024	2025	2026
Chevron Championship	T19	T35	CUT	T30		
U.S. Women's Open	CUT	CUT				
Women's PGA Championship	CUT	T10	T3	CUT		CUT
The Evian Championship	T29	T40	T61	CUT		
Women's British Open		CUT	T56	CUT		

^ The Evian Championship was added as a major in 2013

Top 10
Did not play

CUT = missed the half-way cut
NT = no tournament
T = tied

=== Summary ===
Tournament	Wins	2nd	3rd	Top-5	Top-10	Top-25	Events	Cuts made
Chevron Championship	0	0	0	0	0	2	8	6
U.S. Women's Open	0	0	1	1	1	1	7	1
Women's PGA Championship	0	0	1	1	2	2	10	2
The Evian Championship	0	0	0	0	0	0	4	3
Women's British Open	0	0	0	0	0	0	7	2
Totals	0	0	2	2	3	5	36	14

- Most consecutive cuts made – 4 (2023 Women's PGA – 2024 Chevron)
- Longest streak of top-10s – 1 (three times)

== Team appearances ==
Amateur

- European Ladies' Team Championship (representing Ireland ): 2011, 2013
- Vagliano Trophy (representing Great Britain & Ireland): 2011, 2013
- Curtis Cup (representing Great Britain & Ireland): 2012 (winners), 2014
- Espirito Santo Trophy (representing Ireland): 2012
