= James Twitty =

American painter (c. 1916–1994)

- Born: James Watson Twitty; Mount Vernon, New York, U.S. c. 1916
- Died: October 12, 1994; Pinehurst, North Carolina, U.S.
- Other name: James W. Twitty
- Education: Art Students League of New York, University of Miami
- Occupations: Painter, printmaker
- Movement: Abstract

James Watson Twitty (c. 1916 – October 12, 1994) was an American painter. He is known for his geometric abstract paintings and prints.

== Life and career ==
James Watson Twitty was born c. 1916, in Mount Vernon, New York. He attended the Art Students League of New York, and the University of Miami.

Twitty retired in the late 1950s as a colonel in the United States Air Force. After retirement from the military he taught at the Corcoran School of the Arts and Design in Washington, D.C.

He is known for his geometric abstract paintings and prints, and large collage paintings. Some of his works include an aspect of landscape painting in a dichotomy with geometric shapes.

Twitty's artwork is included museum collections including at the National Gallery of Art in Washington, D.C.; the Smithsonian American Art Museum in Washington, D.C.; the Appleton Museum of Art at the College of Central Florida; the Georgia Museum of Art in Athens, Georgia; and the Dallas Museum of Art in Texas.
