= Country Club of North Carolina =

Gated golf community in North Carolina, US

Coordinates: 35°10′35″N 79°26′26″W

The Country Club of North Carolina
- The CCNC Logo
- Interactive map of The Country Club of North Carolina

Club information
- Location: Pinehurst, North Carolina, U.S.
- Established: 1963
- Type: Private
- Tota holes: 36
- Tournaments: U.S. Amateur (1980), U.S. Girls' Junior (2010), U.S. Junior Amateur (2021), U.S. Senior Amateur (2030), U.S. Women's Amateur (2037), Carolinas Open (3 times), Southern Amateur (1971, 1979, 1985, 1990, 1996, 2007, 2017), U.S. Professional Match Play Championship, ACC Men's Golf Championship (2023)
- Website: www.ccofnc.com

Dogwood Course
- Designed by: Ellis Maples and William C. Byrd (1963); Arthur Hills (2001); Kris Spence (2016)
- Par: 72 (blue tees)
- Length: 6,369 yards (5,824 m)
- Course rating: 71.3
- Slope rating: 131

Cardinal Course
- Designed by: William C. Byrd (1970); Robert Trent Jones (1981); Arthur Hills (2002)
- Par: 72 (blue tees)
- Length: 6,467 yards (5,913 m)
- Course rating: 71.7
- Slope rating: 134

The Country Club of North Carolina (CCNC) is a gated golf community in Pinehurst, North Carolina. The Club will be the host site of the U.S. Senior Amateur in 2030 and the U.S. Women's Amateur in 2037. CCNC will be the first golf club to host the five original USGA Amateur Championships.

== History ==
The Country Club of North Carolina is the oldest gated golf community in the Sandhills, established in 1963. It was begun by several North Carolina investors, 4-6 individuals from each major North Carolina city. Together they purchased an initial 1,200 acres of rolling hills from 13 different land owners just south of the Village of Pinehurst and the notorious Pinehurst No. 2 golf course. Working with community planner William Byrd of Atlanta, Georgia, the group agreed on a master plan for the land they acquired, including a golf course, named Dogwood. The Cardinal Course would come later. Today, the club has a large membership base numbering close to 1,000 covering families across the state and around the world. Over 400 homes have been built over the years behind the gates.

== Golf courses ==
CCNC is home to two golf courses, called the Dogwood Course and the Cardinal Course. Both courses are currently ranked in the top 15 courses in North Carolina.

=== Dogwood Course ===
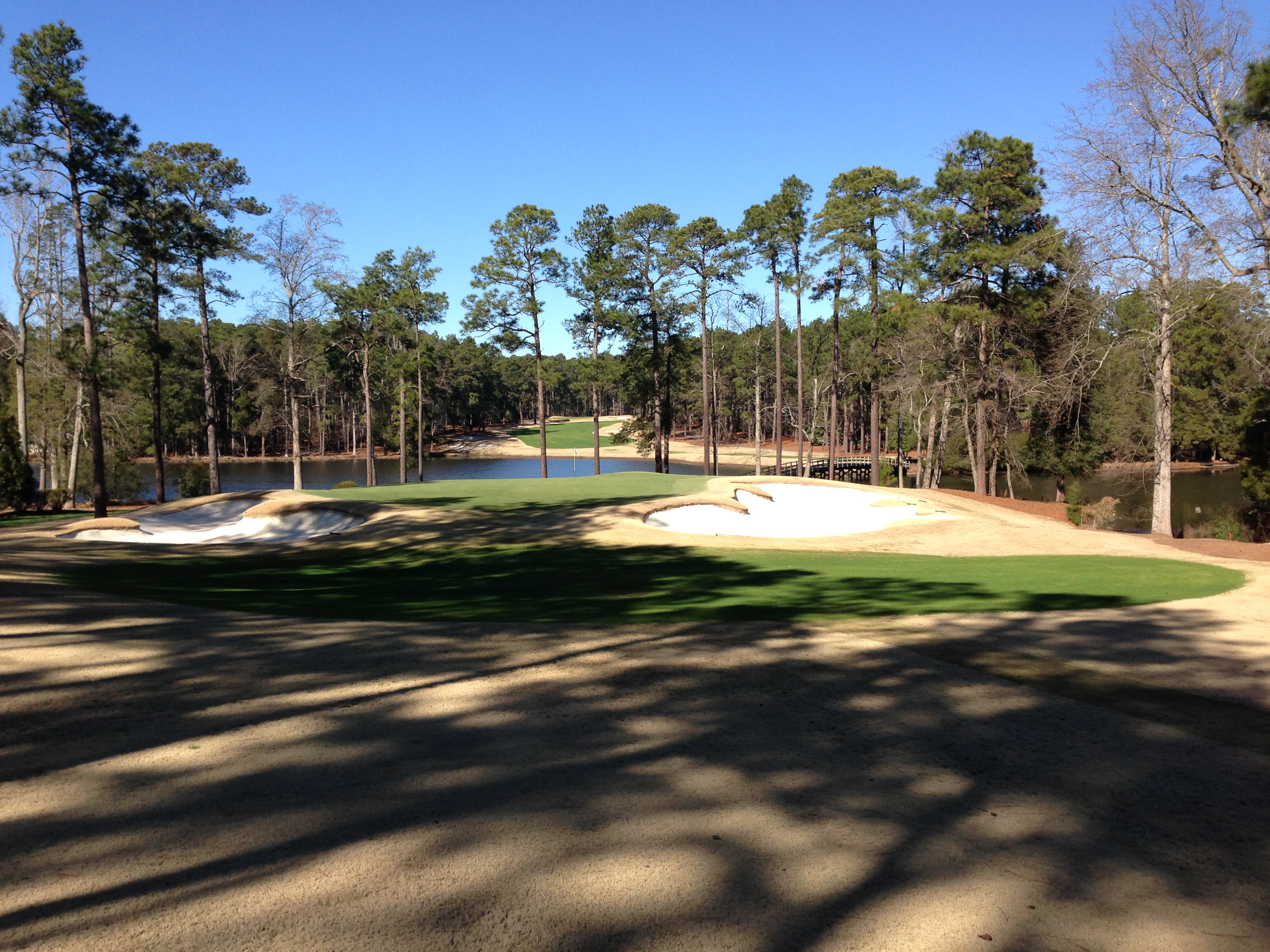
The 13th Hole of the Dogwood Course at The Country Club of North Carolina

The Dogwood Course opened in 1963 surrounding Watson Lake and Lake Dornoch, the two biggest water features in the club. The course was designed by Ellis Maples and William Byrd. A full 18 holes was constructed. The course has hosted a number of different local, state and national tournaments. They include three Carolinas Amateurs, six Southern Amateurs, the PGA Tour World Match Play Championship, and the 1980 USGA Amateur. The club recently hosted the 2010 U.S. Girls Junior on the Dogwood Course. The 1999 renovation was overseen by Arthur Hills and included a rebuilding of the greens, tees, and bunkers. In 2016, the course was switched over to Zeon Zoysia grass during the renovation by Kris Spence. The course is currently ranked 2nd in the Top Courses of the Sandhills Region and 3rd in the Top 100 Courses of North Carolina.

=== Cardinal Course ===
The Cardinal Course began as a 9-hole golf course constructed in 1970. A second 9 holes was completed in 1981, bringing the hole count to 18. The course is currently ranked 6th in the Top Courses of the Sandhills Region and 13th in the Top 100 Courses of North Carolina.

== Facilities ==
The Country Club of North Carolina has a clubhouse, tennis club, and swimming pool that overlooks Watson Lake. A renovation plan has been developed for facilities and will be implemented over the following years.

=== Clubhouse ===
The Country Club of North Carolina constructed its clubhouse in 1965, soon after the club's founding in 1963. Since then, numerous additions have added more space to the predominantly brick structure. The clubhouse overlooks one of the most scenic views in CCNC, being perched on a hill overlooking Watson Lake. The clubhouse has views of different holes of the Dogwood and Cardinal golf courses.

=== Tennis club ===
The tennis complex is home to 8 Har-Tru tennis courts. Six of them are lighted for match play. The facility also hosts a new fitness center and pickleball courts.

=== Swimming pool ===
The swimming pool was renovated in 2004. The entire pool deck overlooks Watson Lake.
