= 1999 U.S. Open (golf) =

Coordinates: 35.190°N 79.468°W

Tournament information
- Dates: June 17–20, 1999
- Location: Pinehurst, North Carolina
- Course(s): Pinehurst Resort, Course No. 2
- Organized by: USGA
- Tour(s): PGA Tour; European Tour; Japan Golf Tour

Statistics
- Par: 70
- Length: 7,175 yards (6,561 m)
- Field: 156 players, 68 after cut
- Cut: 147 (+7)
- Prize fund: $3,500,000 €3,044,423
- Winner's share: $625,000 €543,647

Champion
- (United States) Payne Stewart
- 279 (−1)

Location in the United States

The 1999 United States Open Championship was the 99th U.S. Open, held June 17–20 at Pinehurst Resort Course No. 2 in Pinehurst, North Carolina. Payne Stewart won his second U.S. Open and third major championship, one stroke ahead of runner-up Phil Mickelson.

After a birdie at the penultimate hole to regain an outright lead, Stewart sank a 15-foot (5 m) par putt on the final hole for 279 (−1) and avoided a Monday playoff. He redeemed himself at the U.S. Open, after losing a four-stroke 54-hole lead the year before in San Francisco. Stewart did not get a chance to defend his title in 2000, as he would die four months later in a plane crash. The U.S. Open was his eleventh and final PGA Tour win.

Major winners Tiger Woods and Vijay Singh were in contention late in their final rounds, but each bogeyed and finished two strokes back, tied for third.

This was the first U.S. Open at Pinehurst, which returned in 2005, 2014, and once again in 2024. Previously, it hosted the PGA Championship in 1936, the Ryder Cup in 1951, and the North and South Open from 1902 through 1951. More recently, it was the site of season-ending Tour Championship in 1991 and 1992.

== Course layout ==
Course No. 2

Hole	1	2	3	4	5	6	7	8	9	Out	10	11	12	13	14	15	16	17	18	In	Total
Yards	404	447	335	566	482	222	358	485	179	3,478	610	453	447	383	436	202	489	191	446	3,657	7,135
Par	4	4	4	5	4	3	4	4	3	35	5	4	4	4	4	3	4	3	4	35	70

== Round summaries ==
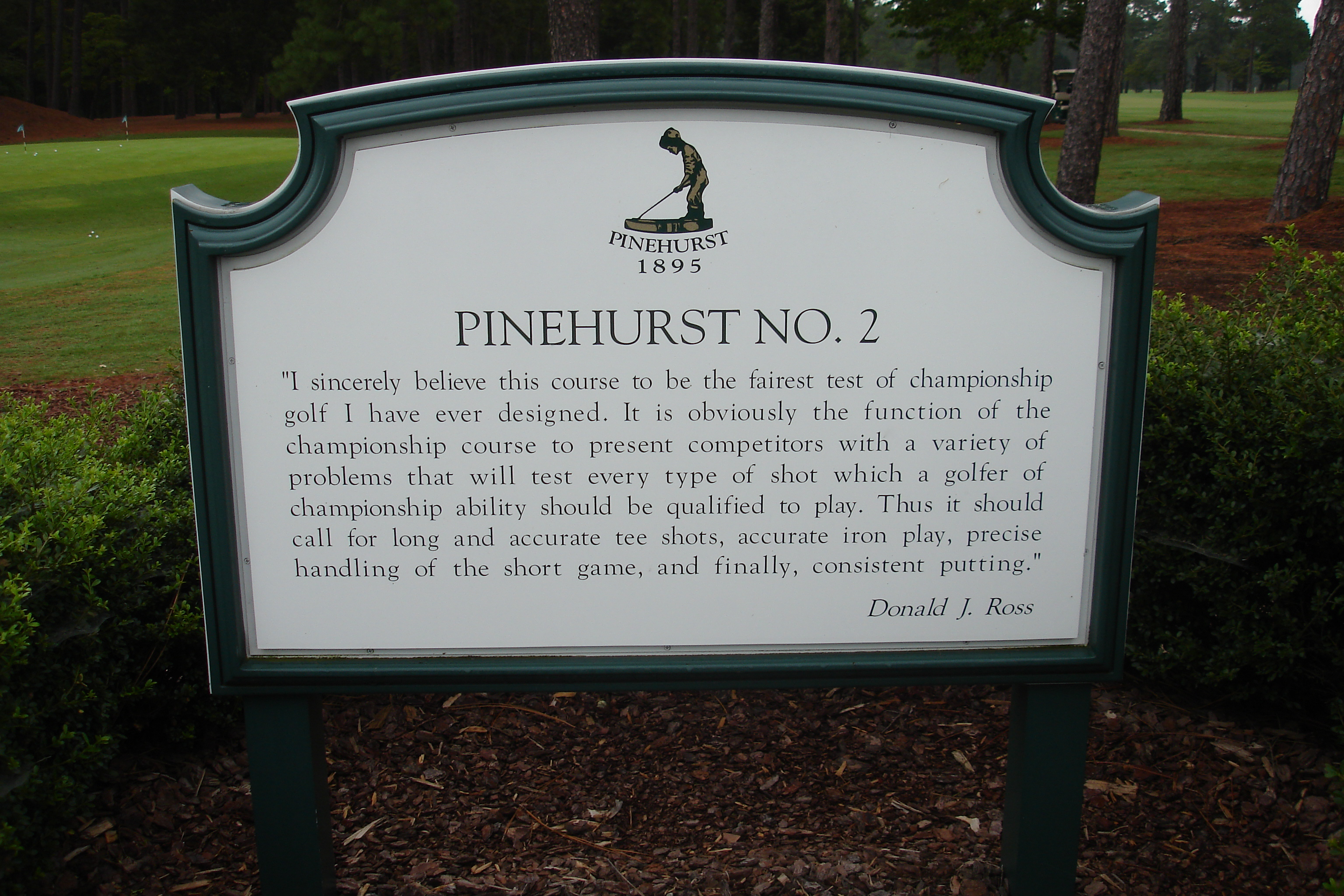

=== First round ===
Thursday, June 17, 1999

Place	Player	Score	To par
T1	(United States) David Duval	67	−3
T1	(United States) Paul Goydos	67	−3
T1	(United States) Billy Mayfair	67	−3
T1	(United States) Phil Mickelson	67	−3
T5	(United States) David Berganio Jr.	68	−2
T5	(United States) John Daly	68	−2
T5	(United States) Payne Stewart	68	−2
T5	(United States) Tiger Woods	68	−2
T5	(Japan) Kaname Yokoo	68	−2
T10	(United States) Brad Fabel	69	−1
T10	(Paraguay) Carlos Franco	69	−1
T10	(United States) Jim Furyk	69	−1
T10	(United States) Tim Herron	69	−1
T10	(United States) Justin Leonard	69	−1
T10	(United States) Rocco Mediate	69	−1
T10	(United States) Larry Mize	69	−1
T10	(Australia) Craig Parry	69	−1
T10	(Fiji) Vijay Singh	69	−1
T10	(United States) Chris Smith	69	−1
T10	(United States) Hal Sutton	69	−1
T10	(United States) Bob Tway	69	−1
T10	(United States) Brian Watts	69	−1
T10	(United States) D. A. Weibring	69	−1

=== Second round ===
Friday, June 18, 1999

The 36-hole cut was at 147 (+7) or better, and 68 players advanced to the weekend.

Place	Player	Score	To par
T1	(United States) David Duval	67-70=137	−3
T1	(United States) Phil Mickelson	67-70=137	−3
T1	(United States) Payne Stewart	68-69=137	−3
T4	(United States) Billy Mayfair	67-72=139	−1
T4	(Fiji) Vijay Singh	69-70=139	−1
T4	(United States) Hal Sutton	69-70=139	−1
T4	(United States) Tiger Woods	68-71=139	−1
T8	(United States) John Huston	71-69=140	E
T8	(United States) Jeff Maggert	71-69=140	E
T10	(United States) Bob Estes	70-71=141	+1
T10	(United States) Paul Goydos	67-74=141	+1
T10	(United States) Tim Herron	69-72=141	+1
T10	(United States) Rocco Mediate	69-72=141	+1

Amateurs: Kuehne (+7), Molder (+11), Barnes (+13), Kuchar (+15), McKnight (+15), Call (+20).

=== Third round ===
Saturday, June 19, 1999

Place	Player	Score	To par
1	(United States) Payne Stewart	68-69-72=209	−1
2	(United States) Phil Mickelson	67-70-73=210	E
T3	(United States) Tim Herron	69-72-70=211	+1
T3	(United States) Tiger Woods	68-71-72=211	+1
T5	(United States) David Duval	67-70-75=212	+2
T5	(Fiji) Vijay Singh	69-70-73=212	+2
T5	(United States) Steve Stricker	70-73-69=212	+2
8	(United States) Billy Mayfair	67-72-74=213	+3
9	(United States) Jeff Maggert	71-69-74=214	+4
T10	(United States) Paul Goydos	67-74-74=215	+5
T10	(United States) John Huston	71-69-75=215	+5
T10	(Spain) Miguel Ángel Jiménez	73-70-72=215	+5
T10	(United States) Hal Sutton	69-70-76=215	+5

=== Final round ===
Sunday, June 20, 1999

Place	Player	Score	To par	Money ($)
1	(United States) Payne Stewart	68-69-72-70=279	−1	625,000
2	(United States) Phil Mickelson	67-70-73-70=280	E	370,000
T3	(Fiji) Vijay Singh	69-70-73-69=281	+1	196,792
T3	(United States) Tiger Woods	68-71-72-70=281	+1	196,792
5	(United States) Steve Stricker	70-73-69-73=285	+5	130,655
6	(United States) Tim Herron	69-72-70-75=286	+6	116,935
T7	(United States) David Duval	67-70-75-75=287	+7	96,260
T7	(United States) Jeff Maggert	71-69-74-73=287	+7	96,260
T7	(United States) Hal Sutton	69-70-76-72=287	+7	96,260
T10	(Northern Ireland) Darren Clarke	73-70-74-71=288	+8	78,863
T10	(United States) Billy Mayfair	67-72-74-75=288	+8	78,863

Amateurs: Hank Kuehne (+26)

==== Scorecard ====
Final round

Hole	1	2	3	4	5	6	7	8	9	10	11	12	13	14	15	16	17	18
Par	4	4	4	5	4	3	4	4	3	5	4	4	4	4	3	4	3	4
(United States) Stewart	−2	−1	−2	−2	−2	−2	−2	−2	−2	−1	−1	E	−1	−1	E	E	−1	−1
(United States) Mickelson	E	E	E	E	E	E	−1	−1	−1	−1	−1	−1	−1	−1	−1	E	E	E
(Fiji) Singh	+2	+2	+2	+2	+2	+2	+2	+1	+1	E	E	E	E	E	E	+1	+1	+1
(United States) Woods	E	E	+1	E	+1	+1	+1	+1	+1	+1	+2	+2	+2	+1	+1	E	+1	+1
(United States) Stricker	+2	+2	+3	+4	+4	+4	+4	+4	+4	+4	+4	+5	+5	+4	+3	+4	+5	+5
(United States) Herron	+1	+1	+1	+2	+1	+3	+4	+5	+4	+4	+4	+5	+5	+5	+5	+5	+5	+6
(United States) Duval	+2	+1	E	E	E	+1	+1	+2	+4	+4	+5	+5	+6	+6	+6	+7	+7	+7
(United States) Maggert	+4	+3	+4	+4	+4	+4	+5	+5	+6	+6	+5	+6	+7	+7	+7	+7	+7	+7
(United States) Sutton	+5	+5	+5	+5	+5	+5	+5	+6	+6	+6	+7	+7	+7	+7	+6	+7	+7	+7
(Northern Ireland) Clarke	+7	+9	+9	+9	+9	+9	+8	+8	+8	+8	+7	+7	+7	+7	+7	+8	+8	+8
(United States) Mayfair	+2	+3	+3	+2	+3	+3	+4	+5	+5	+5	+6	+7	+7	+7	+7	+7	+7	+8

Cumulative tournament scores, relative to par

Birdie	Bogey	Double bogey
