= Joseph Patrick Dwyer =

American soldier (1976–2008)

Joseph Dwyer
- The famous photo of Dwyer on March 25, 2003
- Born: September 28, 1976; Manhasset, New York, U.S.
- Died: June 28, 2008 (aged 31); Pinehurst, North Carolina, U.S.
- Military career
- Allegiance: United States of America
- Branch: United States Army
- Rank: Specialist
- Units: 3rd Squadron, 7th Cavalry Regiment, 3rd Infantry Division
- Conflicts: Iraq War

Joseph Patrick Dwyer (September 28, 1976 – June 28, 2008) was an American soldier, who became famous for a photograph of him helping an ailing Iraqi boy. Dwyer had enlisted in the United States Army after 9/11 and went on to serve as a combat medic in the 3rd Infantry Division. The photograph, taken by Army Times photographer Warren Zinn, was taken five days into the Iraq War and was highly publicized at the time as "hopeful" and "inspirational".

Dwyer died on June 28, 2008. On that day, Dwyer, 31, called a taxi to take him to a hospital near his home in Pinehurst, North Carolina, after earlier taking prescription pills and inhaling fumes from a computer cleaner aerosol. When the driver arrived, Dwyer said that he was too weak to open the door. Police had to kick it down and found that he had collapsed. Within minutes, he had died. He suffered from post-traumatic stress disorder.

A statue of Dwyer in Rocky Point, New York was dedicated on June 28, 2021.
