= Ruth La'Ontra =

American musician

- Born: Ruth La'Ontra Jones; July 22, 1992 (age 33); Pinehurst, North Carolina
- Origin: Aberdeen, North Carolina
- Genres: Christian R&B, black gospel, urban contemporary gospel, contemporary R&B
- Occupation(s): Singer, songwriter
- Instrument(s): vocals, singer-songwriter
- Years active: 2013–present
- Labels: Tyscot
- Website: tyscot.com/members/ruth-laontra/

Ruth La'Ontra Horton (born July 22, 1992), who goes by the stage name Ruth La'Ontra, is an American Christian R&B and urban contemporary gospel artist and musician. She started her music career, in 2013, with the release of So Good by Tyscot Records. She saw her first studio album, So Good, chart on two Billboard charts the Top Gospel Albums and Heatseekers Albums. She also released her second studio album "I Got You (Live)" on September 22, 2017.

== Early life ==
Ruth La'Ontra was born on July 22, 1992, in Pinehurst, North Carolina as Ruth La'Ontra Jones. Her father is Bishop Arvetra Jones, Jr. of Come As You Are Evangelistic Center in Aberdeen, North Carolina and her mother is Ruth C. Jones. She has a sister, Princess, a brother, Arvetra Dominic. Ruth La’Ontra along with her siblings have been singing ever since they were children. They have posted many videos online showcasing their singing abilities and have collaborated on many songs.

== Music career ==
Her music career started in 2013, with the release of So Good, on November 12, 2013, by Tyscot Records. The album charted on the Billboard charts at No. 19 on the Top Gospel Albums and at the 43 position on the Heatseekers Albums chart. This was awarded a four out of five crickets review by Da Gospel Truth, while Timothy Yap of BREATHEcast recognizes "Just like Tasha Cobbs, Tamela Mann and other women of gospel, Ruth has proven once again that if music is to make an impact for the sake of God's kingdom, it's not in the way the artist dresses or moves, but it's in being a sell-out for Jesus Christ." She was nominated at the 30th Stellar Awards for New Artist of the Year and the Traditional Female Vocalist of the Year categories.

== Discography ==
=== Studio albums ===
List of studio albums, with selected chart positions
Title	Album details	Peak chart positions	
Title	Album details	US Gos	US Heat
I Got You	Released: September 12, 2017; Label: Tyscot; CD, digital download	7	–
So Good	Released: November 12, 2013; Label: Tyscot; CD, digital download	19	43
