= 2014 U.S. Women's Open =

Coordinates: 35.190°N 79.468°W

Tournament information
- Dates: June 19–22, 2014
- Location: Pinehurst, North Carolina
- Courses: Pinehurst Resort, Course No. 2
- Organized by: USGA
- Tour: LPGA Tour

Statistics
- Par: 70
- Length: 6,649 yards (6,080 m)
- Field: 156 players, 71 after cut
- Cut: 149 (+9)
- Prize fund: $4.0 million
- Winner's share: $720,000

Champion
- (United States) Michelle Wie
- 278 (−2)

Location in the United States
Location in North Carolina

The 2014 U.S. Women's Open was the 69th U.S. Women's Open, held June 19-22 at Pinehurst Resort Course No. 2 in Pinehurst, North Carolina. It marked the first time that the U.S. Women's Open was played on the same course in the same year as the U.S. Open. The U.S. Women's Open was played a week after the U.S. Open.

First played in 1946, the U.S. Women's Open is the oldest of the five major championships and the second of the 2014 season. It has the largest purse in women's golf at $4.0 million, with a winner's share of $720,000. The tournament was televised for the final time by ESPN and NBC Sports.

Michelle Wie won the only major title of her career as of 2025, two strokes ahead of runner-up Stacy Lewis. Stephanie Meadow was a stroke back in solo third in her debut event as a professional.

== Qualifying and field ==
The championship is open to any female professional or amateur golfer with a USGA handicap index not exceeding 2.4. Players qualified by competing in one of twenty 36-hole qualifying tournaments held at sites across the United States and at international sites in China, England, Japan, and South Korea. Additional players were exempt from qualifying because of past performances in professional or amateur tournaments around the world.

The United States Golf Association received 1,702 entries for the championship, breaking the year-old record of 1,420 in 2013. The handicap index limit in 2013 was 4.4.

=== Exempt from qualifying ===
Many players were exempt in multiple categories. Players are listed only once, in the first category in which they became exempt, with additional categories in parentheses ( ) next to their names. Golfers qualifying in Category 12 who qualified in other categories are denoted with the tour by which they qualified.

1. Winners of the U.S. Women's Open for the last ten years (2004–2013)
Na Yeon Choi (9,13,14), Paula Creamer (8,9,10,11,13,14), Eun-Hee Ji (9), Cristie Kerr (4,9,13,14), Birdie Kim, Inbee Park (4,6,8,9,10,11,13,14), So Yeon Ryu (8,9,13,14)

- Exempt but did not enter tournament: Meg Mallon, Annika Sörenstam

2. Winner and runner-up from the 2013 U.S. Women's Amateur (must be an amateur)
Emma Talley. The runner-up, Yueer Cindy Feng, turned professional in December 2013, forfeiting her exemption from qualifying. She qualified in Bradenton, Florida.

3. Winner of the 2013 Mark H. McCormack Medal (Women's World Amateur Golf Ranking) (must be an amateur)
The winner, Lydia Ko, turned professional in October 2013, forfeiting her exemption from qualifying. She qualified for the tournament in four other categories, with the highest-ranking being category 10.

4. Winners of the LPGA Championship for the last five years (2009–2013)
Shanshan Feng (8,9,11,13,14), Anna Nordqvist (9,10,11,13,14), Yani Tseng (5,6,9)

5. Winners of the Ricoh Women's British Open for the last five years (2009–2013)
Stacy Lewis (6,9,10,11,13,14), Catriona Matthew (9,13,14)
Jiyai Shin was exempt in this category and in categories 9 and 13 but did not enter the tournament.

6. Winners of the Kraft Nabisco Championship for the last five years (2010–2014)
Lexi Thompson (9,10,11,12-LET,13,14), Sun-Young Yoo (9)

7. Winner of the 2013 Evian Championship
Suzann Pettersen (9,11,12-LET,13,14)

8. Ten lowest scorers and anyone tying for 10th place from the 2013 U.S. Women's Open Championship
Jodi Ewart Shadoff (9), I.K. Kim (9,13,14), Jessica Korda (9,11,13,14), Brittany Lang (9), Brittany Lincicome (9), Angela Stanford (9,13,14)

9. Top 70 money leaders from the 2013 final official LPGA money list
Chie Arimura, Christel Boeljon, Nicole Castrale, Chella Choi (10,13,14), Carlota Ciganda (12-LET), Irene Coe, Jacqui Concolino, Sandra Gal, Julieta Granada, Natalie Gulbis, Mina Harigae, Caroline Hedwall, Katherine Hull-Kirk, Karine Icher, Juli Inkster, Jennifer Johnson, Moriya Jutanugarn, Danielle Kang, Haeji Kang, Candie Kung, Ilhee Lee, Jee Young Lee, Meena Lee, Pernilla Lindberg, Mo Martin, Caroline Masson, Ai Miyazato, Mika Miyazato, Azahara Muñoz (10,13,14), Se Ri Pak (13,14), Hee Young Park (11,13,14), Jane Park, Pornanong Phatlum, Gerina Piller, Stacy Prammanasudh (did not enter), Morgan Pressel, Beatriz Recari (11), Jennifer Rosales, Lizette Salas (11,13,14), Dewi Claire Schreefel, Hee Kyung Seo (did not enter), Giulia Sergas, Jenny Shin, Ayako Uehara, Mariajo Uribe, Alison Walshe, Karrie Webb (10,11,13,14), Michelle Wie (10,11,13,14), Amy Yang (11,13,14)

10. Top 10 money leaders from the 2014 official LPGA money list, through the close of entries on April 30
Lydia Ko (11,13,14)

11. Winners of LPGA co-sponsored events, whose victories are considered official, from the conclusion of the 2013 U.S. Women's Open Championship to the initiation of the 2014 U.S. Women's Open Championship
Teresa Lu (12-JLPGA)

12. Top five money leaders from the 2013 Japan LPGA Tour, Korea LPGA Tour and Ladies European Tour

- Japan LPGA Tour: Sun-Ju Ahn (14, withdrew), Rikako Morita, Sakura Yokomine, Yumiko Yoshida
- Korea LPGA Tour: Choi Yoo-lim, Chun In-gee (did not enter), Jang Ha-na (13,14), Kim Hyo-joo (did not enter), Kim Sei-young
- Ladies European Tour: Gwladys Nocera, Lee-Anne Pace

13. Top 25 point leaders from the current Rolex Rankings and anyone tying for 25th place as of April 30, 2014
All players already qualified in other categories.

14. Top 25 point leaders from the current Rolex Rankings and anyone tying for 25th place as of June 16, 2014
All players already qualified in other categories.

15. Special exemptions selected by the USGA
None selected

=== Qualifiers ===
Additional players qualified through sectional qualifying tournaments. For the first time in the history of the U.S. Women's Open, qualifying tournaments took place outside of the United States.

May 5 at Honors Golf Club, Carrollton, Texas
Katie Burnett, Jaye Marie Green, María Hernández, Lisa McCloskey, Belén Mozo

May 12 at Waialae Country Club, Honolulu, Hawaii
Xyra Suyetsugu

May 12 at Butler Country Club, Butler, Pennsylvania
Jessica Porvasnik (a), Jennifer Song, Bailey Tardy (a)

May 14 at Oak Valley Golf Course, Beaumont, California
Marissa Chow (a), Tzu-Chi Lin

May 14 at The Heritage at Westmoor, Westminster, Colorado
Céline Boutier (a), Janie Jackson (a)

May 19 at Higashi Nagoya Country Club, Aichi Prefecture, Japan
Lala Anai, Chisato Hashimoto (a), Eri Joma, Misuzu Narita, Ayaka Watanabe

May 19 at Buckinghamshire Golf Course, Buckinghamshire, England
Amy Boulden, Nikki Campbell, Holly Clyburn, Nicole Garcia, Rebecca Hudson, Kelsey Macdonald, Stephanie Na, Lucy Williams

May 19 at Half Moon Bay G.L., Half Moon Bay, California
Paige Lee (a), Lucy Li (a), Kathleen Scavo (a)

May 19 at Woo Jeong Hills Country Club, Chungnam, South Korea
Narangyi Bae (a), So-young Lee (a) (withdrew)

May 19 at Dunwoody Country Club, Dunwoody, Georgia
Brooke Pancake, Erica Popson, Jessica Wallace

May 19 at Indian Hill Club, Winnetka, Illinois
Hannah Pietila (a), Elizabeth Tong (a)

May 19 at North Oaks Golf Course, North Oaks, Minnesota
Minjee Lee (a)

May 19 at CGA Nanshan International Training Center, Shandong, China
So-Young Jang, Yuting Shi (a)

May 19 at Hermitage Country Club, Manakin-Sabot, Virginia
Dori Carter, Brooke Henderson (a), Sue Kim, Rebecca Lee-Bentham, Kristy McPherson, Kris Tamulis

May 20 at Lake Forest Golf and Country Club, St. Louis, Missouri
Jasi Acharya, Samantha Gotcher (a)

May 20 at The Woodlands Country Club, The Woodlands, Texas
Ashley Knoll, Marissa Steen

May 20 at Rainier Golf & Country Club, Seattle, Washington
Jordan Ferreira (a), Carleigh Silvers

May 21 at Rumson Country Club, Rumson, New Jersey
Laura Davies, Catherine O'Donnell

May 27 at Industry Hills Golf Club, City of Industry, California
Brianna Do, Andrea Lee (a)

May 27 at Thorny Lea Gof Club, Brockton, Massachusetts
Megan Khang (a), Caroline Powers

May 28 at Country Club at DC Ranch, Scottsdale, Arizona
Madison Kerley (a), Sadena Parks, Cheyenne Woods

May 28 at The Ritz-Carlton Members Golf Club, Bradenton, Florida
Sandra Changkija, Yueer Cindy Feng, Paula Hurtado

May 29 at Carolina Trace Country Club, Sanford, North Carolina
Weiling Hsu, Stacey Keating, Ally McDonald (a), Marta Silva

May 30 at Quail Valley Golf Club, Vero Beach, Florida
Karlin Beck, Mathilda Cappeliez (a), Emily Penttila (a)

(a) indicates amateur

=== Alternates added to field ===
The following players were added to the field on June 4 when spots reserved for exemptions in various categories were not used:

- Stephanie Meadow, the first alternate from the Beaumont, California qualifier
- Ashleigh Simon, the first alternate from the Carrollton, Texas qualifier
- Sarah Jane Smith, the first alternate from the Manakin-Sabot, Virginia qualifier
- Kelly Tan, the first alternate from the Dunwoody, Georgia qualifier

Sierra Sims, the first alternate from The Woodlands, Texas, qualifier, was added to the field when Sun-Ju Ahn who was exempt in category 12 withdrew.

Hee Kyung Bae, the first alternate from the Korea qualifier, was added to the field when So-young Lee, who had advanced through the Korea qualifier, withdrew.

Laura Diaz, the first alternate from the Butler, Pennsylvania qualifier, was added to the field on June 10 when the space reserved for the winner of the Manulife Financial LPGA Classic was not used because the winner, Inbee Park, had already qualified in multiple categories.

== Course layout ==
Course No. 2

Hole	1	2	3	4	5	6	7	8	9	Out	10	11	12	13	14	15	16	17	18	In	Total
Yards	366	432	330	451	503	175	389	429	155	3,230	571	447	417	348	419	156	458	184	419	3,419	6,649
Par	4	4	4	4	5	3	4	4	3	35	5	4	4	4	4	3	4	3	4	35	70

- Based on the course setup for the championship, the USGA course rating was 78.1 and the slope rating was 145.

== Round summaries ==
=== First round ===
Thursday, June 19, 2014
Friday, June 20, 2014

Play was suspended Thursday at 7:12 pm EDT due to inclement weather and thirty players completed the first round on Friday morning. Five players finished the round under-par; Stacy Lewis led with a bogey-free 67 (−3) and fellow American Michelle Wie was one stroke back at 68. Minjee Lee, the number one female in the World Amateur Golf Ranking, was tied for third place at one-under-par. The scoring average for the field was 75.83, almost six strokes over-par.

Place	Player	Score	To par
1	(United States) Stacy Lewis	67	−3
2	(United States) Michelle Wie	68	−2
T3	(Australia) Katherine Kirk	69	−1
T3	(Australia) Minjee Lee (a)	69	−1
T3	(South Korea) So Yeon Ryu	69	−1
T6	(United States) Paula Creamer	70	E
T6	(Australia) Karrie Webb	70	E
T8	(Australia) Rebecca Artis	71	+1
T8	(Netherlands) Christel Boeljon	71	+1
T8	(South Korea) Na Yeon Choi	71	+1
T8	(United States) Mina Harigae	71	+1
T8	(Canada) Brooke Henderson (a)	71	+1
T8	(United States) Juli Inkster	71	+1
T8	(South Korea) Eun-Hee Ji	71	+1
T8	(South Korea) I. K. Kim	71	+1
T8	(Canada) Sue Kim	71	+1
T8	(Taiwan) Candie Kung	71	+1
T8	(Northern Ireland) Stephanie Meadow	71	+1
T8	(Thailand) Pornanong Phatlum	71	+1
T8	(United States) Angela Stanford	71	+1
T8	(United States) Lexi Thompson	71	+1
T8	(South Korea) Amy Yang	71	+1

=== Second round ===
Friday, June 20, 2014

Michelle Wie was the only one to break par in both rounds, shooting 68 again (tied for low round) to lead at 136 (−4), three strokes ahead of Lexi Thompson. First round leader Stacy Lewis shot 73 (+3) and was tied for third with amateur Minjee Lee and Amy Yang at even-par 140. Only six players shot under-par, and the field average was 75.01. Six amateurs made the cut along with 65 professionals at 149 (+9) or better.

Place	Player	Score	To par
1	(United States) Michelle Wie	68-68=136	−4
2	(United States) Lexi Thompson	71-68=139	−1
T3	(Australia) Minjee Lee (a)	69-71=140	E
T3	(United States) Stacy Lewis	67-73=140	E
T3	(South Korea) Amy Yang	71-69=140	E
6	(South Korea) Na Yeon Choi	71-70=141	+1
T7	(United States) Paula Creamer	70-72=142	+2
T7	(Colombia) Mariajo Uribe	72-70=142	+2
T7	(Japan) Sakura Yokomine	74-68=142	+2
T10	(Northern Ireland) Stephanie Meadow	71-72=143	+3
T10	(South Korea) So Yeon Ryu	69-74=143	+3
T10	(United States) Angela Stanford	71-72=143	+3
T10	(Australia) Karrie Webb	70-73=143	+3

=== Third round ===
Saturday, June 21, 2014

Amy Yang shot 68 (−2) to move into a tie for first with Michelle Wie, who shot a two-over-par 72. They were the only competitors under par after the third round, at 208 (−2). Two-time champion Juli Inkster, age 53, shot the low round of the first three days, 66 (−4), to move into a tie for third, four strokes back. First round leader Stacy Lewis carded a 74 (+4) and fell to 214 (+4), six strokes back in a tie for twelfth. Eight were under par for the round and the field scoring average was 73.30, the lowest of the championship.

Place	Player	Score	To par
T1	(United States) Michelle Wie	68-68-72=208	−2
T1	(South Korea) Amy Yang	71-69-68=208	−2
T3	(South Korea) Na Yeon Choi	71-70-71=212	+2
T3	(United States) Juli Inkster	71-75-66=212	+2
T3	(Australia) Minjee Lee (a)	69-71-72=212	+2
T3	(Northern Ireland) Stephanie Meadow	71-72-69=212	+2
T7	(Thailand) Pornanong Phatlum	71-73-69=213	+3
T7	(South Korea) So Yeon Ryu	69-74-70=213	+3
T7	(United States) Lexi Thompson	71-68-74=213	+3
T7	(Australia) Karrie Webb	70-73-70=213	+3
T7	(Japan) Sakura Yokomine	74-68-71=213	+3

=== Final round ===
Sunday, June 22, 2014

Michelle Wie shot an even-par 70 final round to win by two strokes over Stacy Lewis. It was Wie's first major and fourth LPGA Tour win. She had a three-shot lead with three holes to play, but double-bogeyed the 16th hole. A birdie on 17 and par on 18 sealed the win. Lewis and Catriona Matthew shot the low rounds of the day, 66. This was the easiest scoring day of the championship; 16 players scored under-par and the field average was 72.39.

Place	Player	Score	To par	Money ($)
1	(United States) Michelle Wie	68-68-72-70=278	−2	720,000
2	(United States) Stacy Lewis	67-73-74-66=280	E	432,000
3	(Northern Ireland) Stephanie Meadow	71-72-69-69=281	+1	271,373
4	(South Korea) Amy Yang	71-69-68-74=282	+2	191,536
T5	(South Korea) Meena Lee	72-73-70-68=283	+3	149,942
T5	(South Korea) So Yeon Ryu	69-74-70-70=283	+3	149,942
T7	(Thailand) Pornanong Phatlum	71-73-69-71=284	+4	113,582
T7	(United States) Lexi Thompson	71-68-74-71=284	+4	113,582
T7	(Japan) Sakura Yokomine	74-68-71-71=284	+4	113,582
T10	(Canada) Brooke Henderson (a)	71-73-72-69=285	+5	90,861
T10	(Scotland) Catriona Matthew	75-69-75-66=285	+5	90,861
T10	(South Korea) Jenny Shin	74-70-73-68=283	+5	90,861

==== Scorecard ====
Final round

Hole	1	2	3	4	5	6	7	8	9	10	11	12	13	14	15	16	17	18
Par	4	4	4	4	5	3	4	4	3	5	4	4	4	4	3	4	3	4
(United States) Wie	−1	−1	−1	−1	−1	−1	−1	−1	−1	−3	−3	−3	−3	−3	−3	−1	−2	−2
(United States) Lewis	+5	+4	+4	+5	+5	+4	+4	+3	+2	+1	+1	+1	E	+1	+1	+2	+1	E
(Northern Ireland) Meadow	+2	+2	+2	+3	+3	+3	+3	+3	+4	+2	+2	+2	+2	+2	+2	+2	+2	+1
(South Korea) Yang	−1	+1	+1	+2	+1	+1	+2	+2	+2	+1	+1	+2	+2	+3	+3	+3	+3	+2
