= Pinehurst Race Track =

Historic harness race track in North Carolina, United States

- Pinehurst Harness Track
- U.S. National Register of Historic Places
- U.S. Historic district
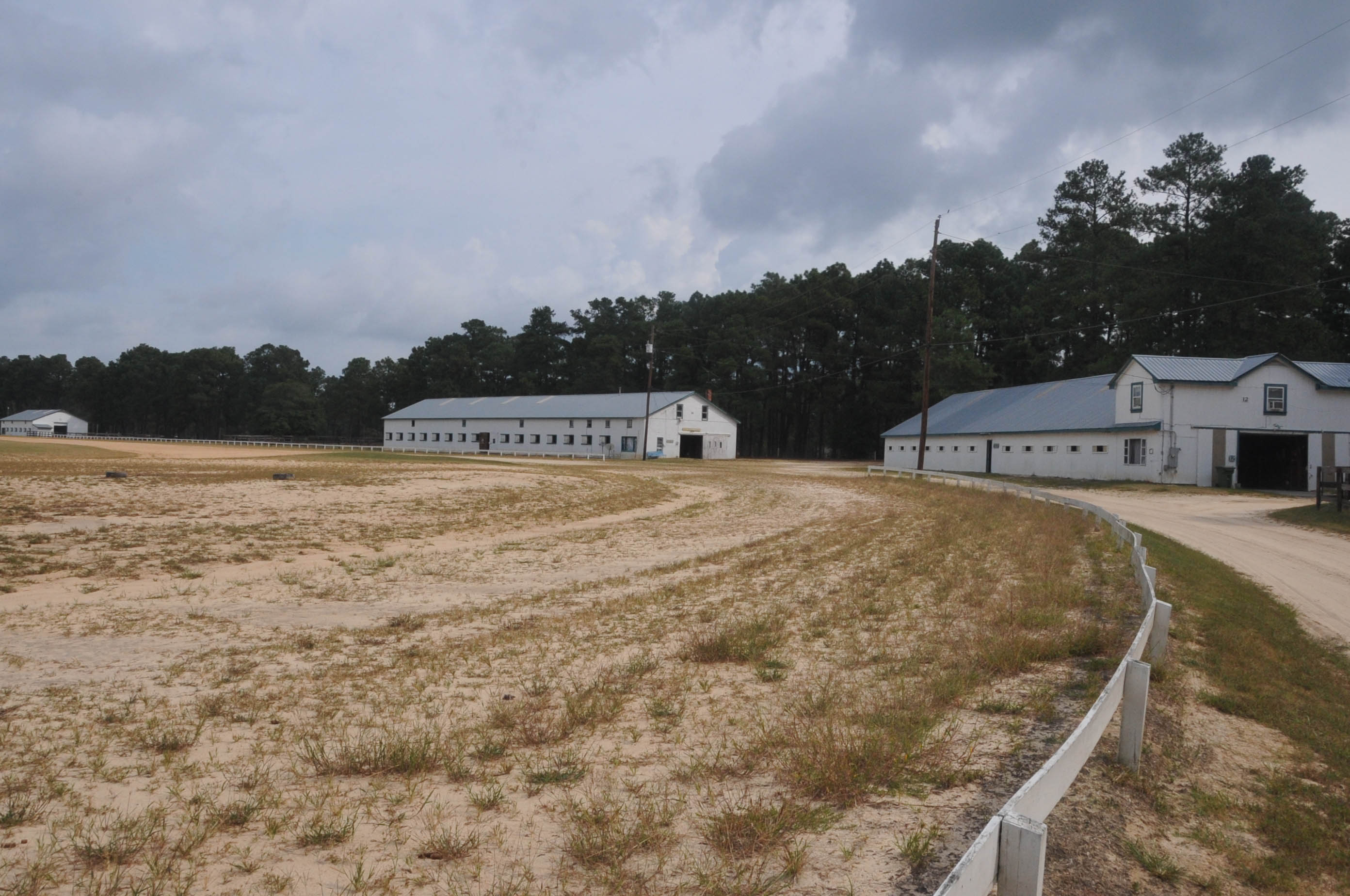
- Pinehurst Harness Track, March 2007

- Location within North Carolina Location within the United States
- Nearest city: Jct. of Morgantown Rd. and NC 5, SE corner, near Pinehurst, North Carolina
- Coordinates: 35°10′54″N 79°27′59″W
- Area: 50 acres (20 ha)
- Built: 1915
- Architectural style: Mission/spanish Revival, Spanish Colonial Revival
- NRHP reference No.: 92001628
- Added to NRHP: November 27, 1992

Pinehurst Harness Track is a historic horse racing track and national historic district located at Pinehurst in Moore County, North Carolina, USA. The district encompasses 10 contributing buildings, 8 contributing sites, and 1 contributing structure on a complex of barns, stables and other horse-related buildings and paddocks arranged around two oval-shaped race tracks. The oval-shaped race tracks are believed to have been laid out by 1915 as part of the Pinehurst Harness Track established by Leonard Tufts. The Amphidrome is a large agricultural exhibition hall built about 1917. It is a 2 1/2-story, gable-roofed building with stuccoed exterior walls and massive timber roof trusses in the Mission Revival style. Other contributing resources include six paddocks (c. 1916-1920), six barns (c. 1910), harness shop (1930), farrier shop (c. 1910), clubhouse (c. 1916), the network of lanes and driveways (c. 1910), and fences (c. 1910). Pinehurst Harness Track is the site of the oldest surviving early-20th century fair exhibition hall in the state.

It was added to the National Register of Historic Places in 1992.
