= James Walker Tufts =

American businessman (1835–1902)

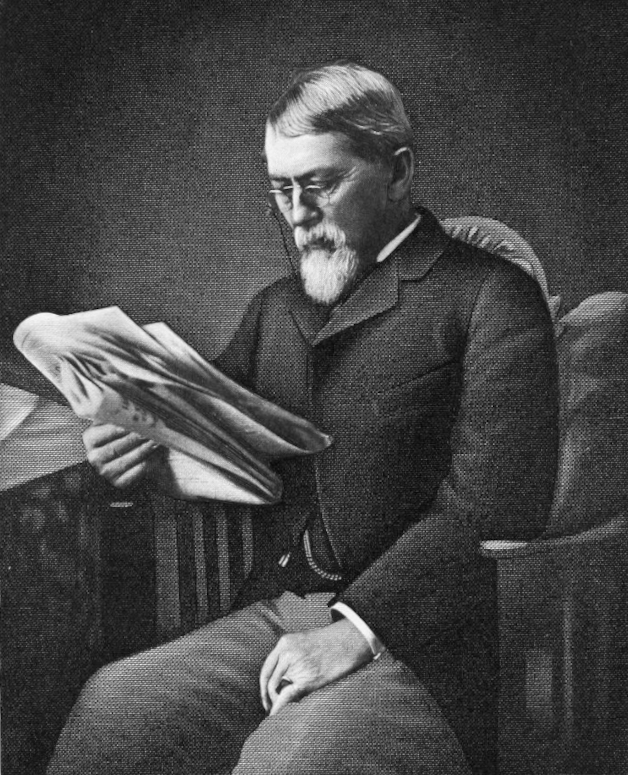
- Born: February 11, 1835; Charlestown, Massachusetts
- Died: February 3, 1902 (aged 66); Pinehurst, North Carolina
- Occupation: Businessman

Signature
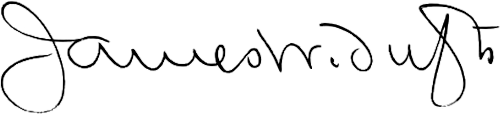

James Walker Tufts (February 11, 1835 – February 3, 1902) is known for his founding of Pinehurst, North Carolina and for his development of a successful business in silver plate tableware. He also founded the Arctic Soda Fountain Co. and eventually merged with A. D. Puffer & Sons (Boston, Massachusetts), John Matthews (New York City, New York), and Charles Lippincott (Philadelphia, Pennsylvania) to form the American Soda Fountain Co. Tufts was the inventor of the Arctic Soda Fountain and was installed as the first president of the merger that formed American Soda Fountain.

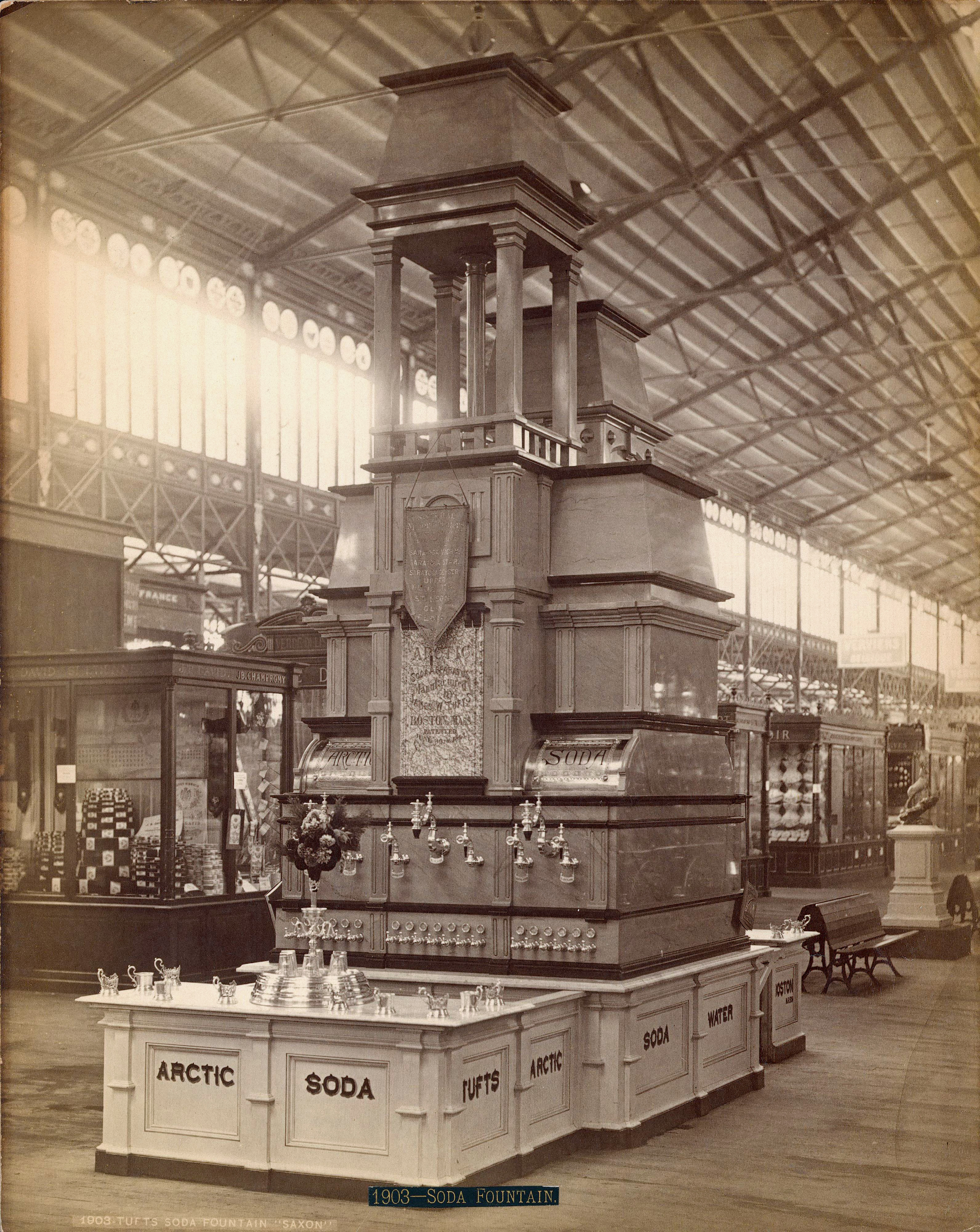
Tufts Arctic Soda Fountain ("Saxon" model) at the U.S. Centennial Exhibition, Philadelphia, 1876

== Biography ==
Tufts was born in Charlestown, Massachusetts on February 11, 1835, to Leonard Tufts and Hepzebah Fosdick Tufts. He was "an entrepreneur, inventor, and philanthropist. He rose from being a sixteen-year-old drug store apprentice to becoming a wealthy businessman who had the vision and determination to build Pinehurst, in only six months." In 1895, Tufts initially purchased 500 acres (2.0 km^{2}), and eventually purchased an additional 5,500 acres (22 km^{2}), of land for approximately $1.25 per acre in the North Carolina Sandhills, with the vision of building a "health resort for people of modest means". Originally dubbed "Tuftstown" during development, Tuftstown became the village of Pinehurst, and home of the Pinehurst Resort—the name was chosen from a list of losing names proposed for Oak Bluffs on Martha's Vineyard, formerly known as Cottage City. James Walker Tufts was a prominent summer resident of Cottage City.

Tufts hired the landscape architecture firm started by Frederick Law Olmsted to do the initial city planning; because his health was failing, Olmsted himself was unable to play an active role.

Pinehurst later became known for its golf courses with the arrival of golf pro Donald Ross (originally of Dornoch, Scotland) in December, 1900. Ross designed four of Pinehurst's golf courses.

Tufts died in Pinehurst on February 2, 1902. Pinehurst was controlled by the Tufts family until 1970. James Tufts's son Leonard, and his grandson, Richard, succeeded him.
