= 1951 Ryder Cup =

Golf tournament in the United States

9th Ryder Cup Matches
- Dates: November 2–4, 1951
- Venue: Pinehurst Resort; Course No. 2
- Location: Pinehurst, North Carolina
- Captains: Sam Snead (USA); Arthur Lacey (Great Britain)
(United States)	9 1/2	2 1/2	(United Kingdom)
- United States wins the Ryder Cup

Location map
- Location within North Carolina

The 9th Ryder Cup Matches were held November 2–4, 1951 at Course No. 2 of the Pinehurst Resort in Pinehurst, North Carolina. The United States team won their fifth consecutive competition by a score of 9 1/2 to 2 1/2 points.

The two-day competition was held on Friday and Sunday; Saturday was an off day so that the participants (and spectators) could attend a college football game in Chapel Hill, about 70 miles (110 km) northeast. North Carolina hosted top-ranked Tennessee and the visiting Volunteers won in a rout, 27-0.

Course No. 2, designed by Donald Ross, was set at 7,007 yards (6,407 m) for this Ryder Cup. It later hosted the U.S. Open in 1999, 2005, and 2014.

== Format ==
The Ryder Cup is a match play event, with each match worth one point. From 1927 through 1959, the format consisted of 4 foursome (alternate shot) matches on the first day and 8 singles matches on the second day, for a total of 12 points. Therefore, 6½ points were required to win the Cup. All matches were played to a maximum of 36 holes.

== Teams ==
This was the second and final Ryder Cup for Ben Hogan as a competitor, following 1947. Although he won three majors in 1953, he declined to participate on that year's team. Hogan was a non-playing captain in 1949 and 1967.

Team USA
Name	Age	Previous Ryder Cups	Matches	W–L–H	Winning percentage
Sam Snead – captain	39	3	5	4–1–0	80.00
Skip Alexander	33	1	1	0–1–0	0.00
Jack Burke Jr.	28	0	Rookie
Jimmy Demaret	41	2	4	4–0–0	100.00
Dutch Harrison	41	2	3	2–1–0	66.67
Clayton Heafner	37	1	2	2–0–0	100.00
Ben Hogan	39	1	1	1–0–0	100.00
Lloyd Mangrum	37	2	4	3–1–0	75.00
Ed Oliver	36	1	2	2–0–0	100.00
Henry Ransom	40	0	Rookie

In April 1951 the British P.G.A. appointed Arthur Lacey as non-playing captain and chose a selection committee of four which included Lacey and Bill Cox. In late-July eight players were selected: Bousfield, Daly, Faulkner, Hargreaves, Lees, Panton, Rees and Ward. The remaining two places were to be selected after the News of the World Match Play. The final two places were later given to Weetman and Adams, the finalists in the News of the World Match Play.

Team Great Britain
Name	Age	Previous Ryder Cups	Matches	W–L–H	Winning percentage
(England) Arthur Lacey	47	Non-playing captain
(Scotland) Jimmy Adams	41	2	4	2–2–0	50.00
(England) Ken Bousfield	32	1	1	1–0–0	100.00
(Northern Ireland) Fred Daly	40	2	4	1–3–0	25.00
(England) Max Faulkner	35	2	4	1–3–0	25.00
(England) Jack Hargreaves	37	0	Rookie
(England) Arthur Lees	43	2	4	1–3–0	25.00
(Scotland) John Panton	35	0	Rookie
(Wales) Dai Rees	38	3	5	2–2–1	50.00
(England) Charlie Ward	40	2	4	0–4–0	0.00
(England) Harry Weetman	31	0	Rookie

== Friday's foursome matches ==
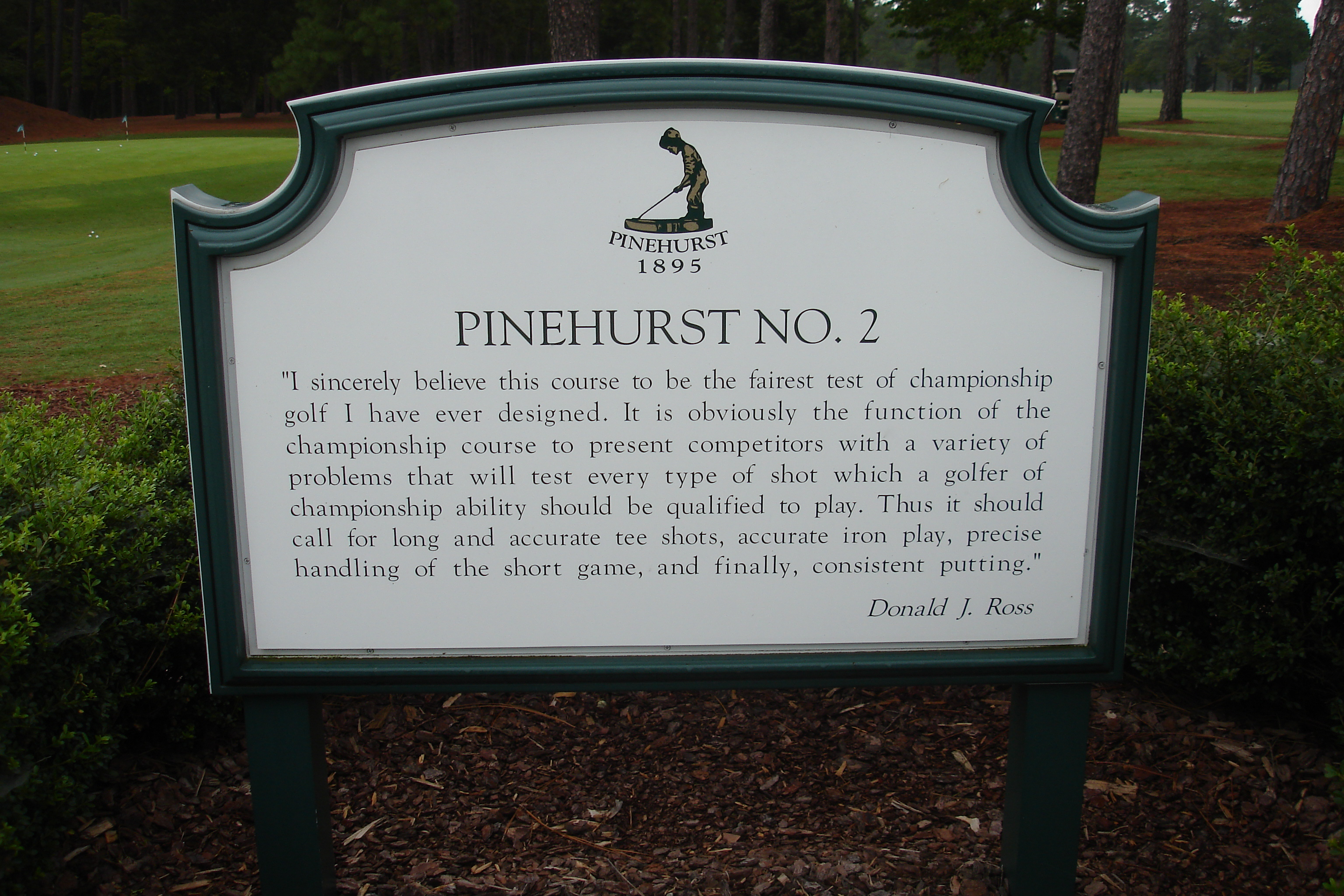

	Results
Faulkner/Rees	(United States) 5 & 3	Heafner/Burke
Ward/Lees	(United Kingdom) 2 & 1	Oliver/Ransom
Adams/Panton	(United States) 5 & 4	Snead/Mangrum
Daly/Bousfield	(United States) 5 & 4	Hogan/Demaret
1	Session	3
1	Overall	3

18 hole scores: Heafner/Burke: 2 up, Ward/Lees: 3 up, Snead/Mangrum: 5 up, Hogan/Demaret: 3 up.

== Sunday's singles matches ==
	Results
Jimmy Adams	(United States) 4 & 3	Jack Burke Jr.
Dai Rees	(United States) 2 up	Jimmy Demaret
Fred Daly	halved	Clayton Heafner
Harry Weetman	(United States) 6 & 5	Lloyd Mangrum
Arthur Lees	(United Kingdom) 2 & 1	Ed Oliver
Charlie Ward	(United States) 3 & 2	Ben Hogan
John Panton	(United States) 8 & 7	Skip Alexander
Max Faulkner	(United States) 4 & 3	Sam Snead
1 1/2	Session	6 1/2
2 1/2	Overall	9 1/2

18 hole scores: Burke: 6 up, Rees: 1 up, Heafner: 3 up, Mangrum: 6 up, Lees: 2 up, Hogan: 2 up, Alexander: 5 up, Snead: 4 up.

== Individual player records ==
Each entry refers to the win–loss–half record of the player.

=== United States ===
Player	Points	Overall	Singles	Foursomes
Skip Alexander	1	1–0–0	1–0–0	0–0–0
Jack Burke Jr.	2	2–0–0	1–0–0	1–0–0
Jimmy Demaret	2	2–0–0	1–0–0	1–0–0
Clayton Heafner	1.5	1–0–1	0–0–1	1–0–0
Ben Hogan	2	2–0–0	1–0–0	1–0–0
Lloyd Mangrum	2	2–0–0	1–0–0	1–0–0
Ed Oliver	0	0–2–0	0–1–0	0–1–0
Henry Ransom	0	0–1–0	0–0–0	0–1–0
Sam Snead	2	2–0–0	1–0–0	1–0–0

Dutch Harrison did not play in any matches.

=== Great Britain ===
Player	Points	Overall	Singles	Foursomes
Jimmy Adams	0	0–2–0	0–1–0	0–1–0
Ken Bousfield	0	0–1–0	0–0–0	0–1–0
Fred Daly	0.5	0–1–1	0–0–1	0–1–0
Max Faulkner	0	0–2–0	0–1–0	0–1–0
Arthur Lees	2	2–0–0	1–0–0	1–0–0
John Panton	0	0–2–0	0–1–0	0–1–0
Dai Rees	0	0–2–0	0–1–0	0–1–0
Charlie Ward	1	1–1–0	0–1–0	1–0–0
Harry Weetman	0	0–1–0	0–1–0	0–0–0

Jack Hargreaves did not play in any matches.
