= Pinehurst Resort =

Golf resort in North Carolina, United States

Pinehurst Golf Resort

- Location within North Carolina Location within the United States
- 35.1895°N 79.4678°W

Club information
- Location: Pinehurst, North Carolina, United States
- Established: 1895
- Type: Resort
- Total holes: 171
- Website: pinehurst.com

Course No. 1
- Designed by: Leroy Culver: First Nine; John Dunn Tucker: Second Nine
- Par: 70 (72)
- Length: 6,089 yards (5,568 m)
- Course rating: 68.4
- Slope rating: 118

Course No. 2
- Designed by: Donald J. Ross; Bill Coore & Ben Crenshaw (2010 renovation)
- Par: 70 (72)
- Length: 7,588 yards (6,938 m)
- Course rating: 76.5
- Slope rating: 138

Course No. 3
- Designed by: Donald J. Ross
- Par: 68
- Length: 5,155 yards (4,714 m)
- Course rating: 64.9
- Slope rating: 112

Course No. 4
- Designed by: Gil Hanse
- Par: 72
- Length: 7,227 yards (6,608 m)
- Course rating: 74.9
- Slope rating: 138

Course No. 5
- Designed by: Ellis Maples
- Par: 72
- Length: 6,828 yards (6,244 m)
- Course rating: 73.1
- Slope rating: 135

Course No. 6
- Designed by: George Fazio & Tom Fazio
- Par: 72
- Length: 7,053 yards (6,449 m)
- Course rating: 74.7
- Slope rating: 139

Course No. 7
- Designed by: Rees Jones
- Par: 72
- Length: 7,216 yards (6,598 m)
- Course rating: 75.5
- Slope rating: 143

Course No. 8
- Designed by: Tom Fazio
- Par: 72
- Length: 7,099 yards (6,491 m)
- Course rating: 74.1
- Slope rating: 137

Course No. 9
- Designed by: Jack Nicklaus
- Par: 72
- Length: 7,118 yards (6,509 m)
- Course rating: 74.2
- Slope rating: 135

Course No. 10
- Designed by: Tom Doak Angela Moser
- Par: 70
- Length: 7,020 yards (6,420 m)
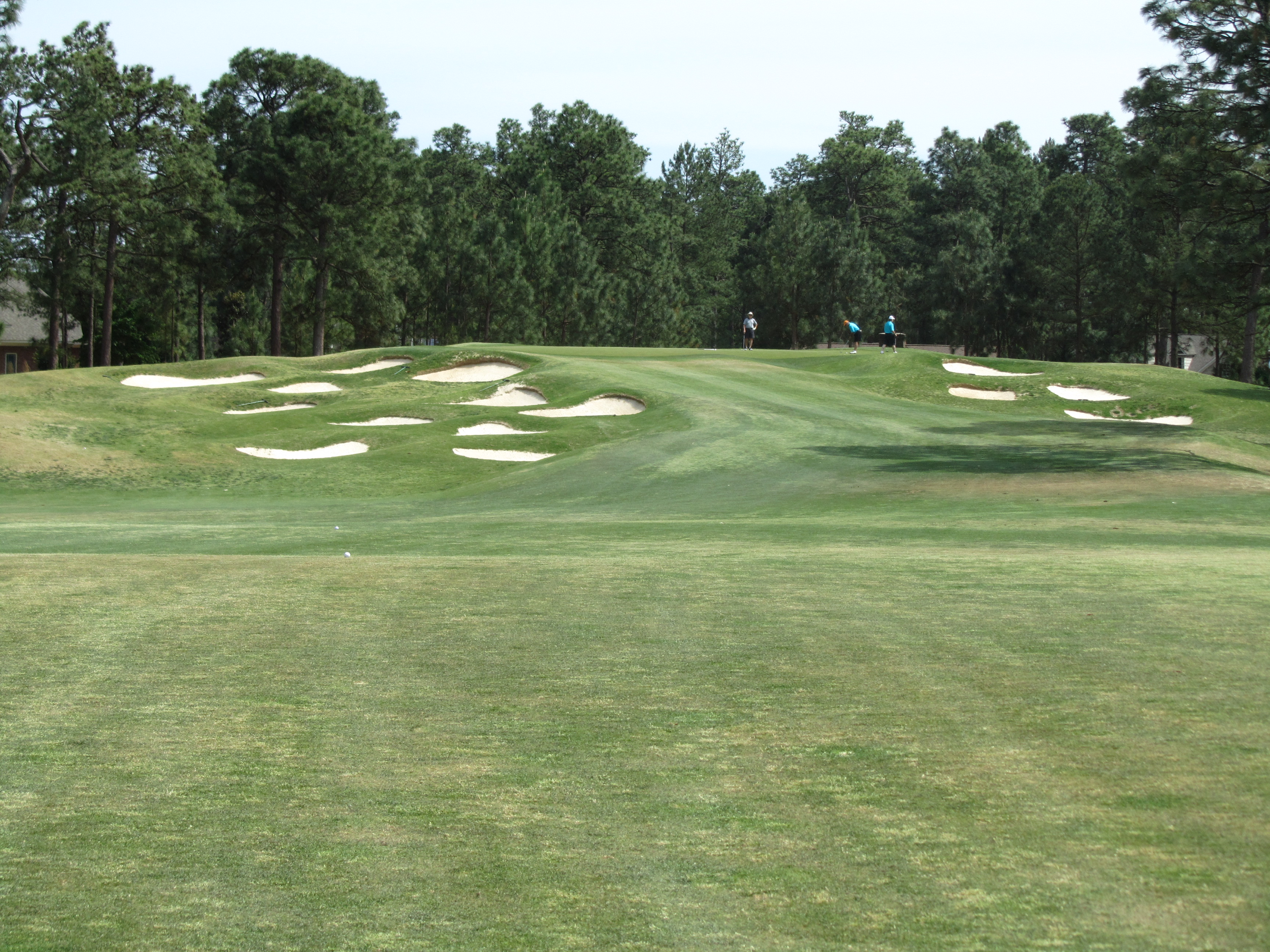
- Course No. 4

Pinehurst Resort is a golf resort in Pinehurst, North Carolina, United States. It has hosted a number of prestigious golf tournaments including four U.S. Open Championships, one U.S. Women's Open, three U.S. Amateurs, one PGA Championship, and the Ryder Cup.

Pinehurst consists of ten 18-hole golf courses, each named simply by a number, an 18 hole putting course, and a 9-hole short course. Pinehurst No. 2 has consistently been ranked as one of the top courses in North Carolina and among the best in the United States. In addition to the golf courses, Pinehurst has three hotels, as well as many villas, condos, restaurants, and other leisure facilities. Pinehurst Resort was inducted into Historic Hotels of America, the official program of the National Trust for Historic Preservation, since 1991.

== History ==
Pinehurst was founded by Boston soda fountain magnate James Walker Tufts. He purchased 5,500 acres (22 km^{2}) for approximately $1.25 per acre in 1895, and opened the Holly Inn New Year's Eve of that year. The first golf course was laid out in 1897-98, and the first championship held at Pinehurst was the United North and South Amateur Championship of 1901. Pinehurst's best known course, "Pinehurst No. 2," was completed in 1907 to designs by Donald Ross, who became associated with Pinehurst for nearly half a century. After Pinehurst No. 2 was opened in 1907, Donald Ross said that the course was, "The fairest test of championship golf I have ever designed."

From 1902-1951, Pinehurst was the home of the North and South Open, which was one of the most prestigious golf tournaments in the United States at that time. Pinehurst is still home to the annual North and South Amateur Golf Championships, a series of tournaments that includes a Men's Championship, inaugurated in 1901, and the Women's Championship that began two years later.

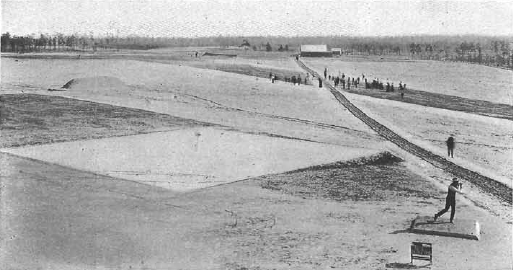
Pinehurst in 1901. The No. 1 course had square sand greens at that time. The No. 2 course was converted from oiled sand greens to Bermuda turf in 1935.

The first PGA Tour major staged at Pinehurst was the PGA Championship in 1936, won by Denny Shute. In 1951, the resort hosted the Ryder Cup, and, in 1991 and 1992, it was the venue for The Tour Championship.

In 1999, Pinehurst staged its second major, the U.S. Open, won by Payne Stewart at the No. 2 course. There is currently a statue behind the 18th hole at Pinehurst No. 2 showing Stewart's famous victory pose after making a putt on the 18th hole to defeat Phil Mickelson. The U.S. Open returned in 2005, won by New Zealand's Michael Campbell. In 2011, Pinehurst No. 2 completed a $2.5 million, year-long renovation led by Bill Coore and Ben Crenshaw. The goal was to revert the course back to the original Donald Ross design.

In an unprecedented move, the USGA brought both the men's U.S. Open and the U.S. Women's Open to Pinehurst No. 2 in 2014. The U.S. Open was scheduled at its normal time, ending on the third Sunday in June (Father's Day), and the women played the following week. The USGA has since named Pinehurst No. 2 as an "anchor" venue for the national championship, hosting the men's open at least once every six years through 2047 including a repeat of the U.S. Open/U.S. Women's Open double in 2029.

Apart from elite amateur and professional tournaments, Pinehurst's courses are the traditional site for the NCHSAA state high school championship for both boys and girls in the largest enrollment classes.

The resort now has ten golf courses, three hotels, a spa and extensive sports and leisure facilities. It was ranked as the world's largest golf resort by the Guinness World Records before it was surpassed by Mission Hills Golf Club in China. The property’s old-growth longleaf pine trees are home to the federally endangered Red-cockaded Woodpecker.

The No. 2 course is included in the Links and the Tiger Woods PGA Tour video game series; the No. 8 course is also available for the Links game. Both Pinehurst No. 2 and Pinehurst No. 8 are available to play on E6 software.

Pinehurst was owned by the Tufts family until 1970, when it was sold to Malcom McLean. The Tufts Archives are located in the Given Memorial Library in Pinehurst. After the property was acquired by a set of banks in 1982, it was sold to Robert H. Dedman, Sr., founder of ClubCorp. When the Dedman family sold ClubCorp, they retained Pinehurst.

In June 1999, National Public Radio reported that the Pinehurst Resort was using threats of trademark infringement lawsuits to prevent any businesses located in the area of Pinehurst village from using the term "Pinehurst" in their business names.

== Major tournaments hosted ==
| Year | Tournament | Winner | Winner's share ($) |
|---|---|---|---|
| 1936 | PGA Championship | (United States) Denny Shute | 1,000 |
| 1951 | Ryder Cup | United States | n/a |
| 1962 | U.S. Amateur | (United States) Labron Harris Jr. | n/a |
| 1994 | U.S. Senior Open | (South Africa) Simon Hobday | 145,000 |
| 1999 | U.S. Open | (United States) Payne Stewart | 625,000 |
| 2005 | U.S. Open | (New Zealand) Michael Campbell | 1,170,000 |
| 2008 | U.S. Amateur | (New Zealand) Danny Lee | n/a |
| 2014 | U.S. Open | (Germany) Martin Kaymer | 1,620,000 |
| 2014 | U.S. Women's Open | (United States) Michelle Wie | 720,000 |
| 2019 | U.S. Amateur | (United States) Andy Ogletree | n/a |
| 2024 | U.S. Open | (United States) Bryson DeChambeau | 4,300,000 |
| 2027 | U.S. Women's Amateur | | |
| 2029 | U.S. Open | | |
| 2029 | U.S. Women's Open | | |
| 2035 | U.S. Open | | |

- All professional tournaments and 1962 U.S. Amateur held at Course No. 2. 2008 and 2019 U.S. Amateur qualifying rounds played on No. 2 & 4. 2019 U.S. Amateur played final on No. 2 & 4.

== World Amateur Team Championships hosted ==
| Year | Tournament | Winner | Organizer |
|---|---|---|---|
| 1980 | Espirito Santo Trophy | United States (Juli Inkster, Patti Rizzo, Carol Semple) | World Amateur Golf Council |
| 1980 | Eisenhower Trophy | United States (Jim Holtgrieve, Jay Sigel, Hal Sutton, Bob Tway) | World Amateur Golf Council |

- Both tournaments held at Course No. 2.

== Golf courses ==
Pinehurst Resort operates ten golf courses; the best known, Course No. 2, opened in 1907. Designed by Donald Ross, it has hosted several major tournaments. Several notable golf course architects have designed courses for the resort. These architects include Donald Ross, Ellis Maples, Tom Fazio, Jack Nicklaus, and Gil Hanse. Houses border most of the courses but only one course was created specifically as a housing development: Pinehurst #7.

=== Pinehurst No. 1 ===
The first nine of what would become Pinehurst No. 1 was designed by Leroy Culver in 1897 and the second nine by John Dunn Tucker in 1898. Donald Ross however came in 1901 to tie it all together into a full 18-hole course, beginning a long career at what would become Pinehurst Resort. While there have been many changes to No. 1 over the years, many to accommodate the construction and renovation of the other courses, the original design is still there. The course is currently grassed with Certified Tifway 419 Bermuda tees, fairways, and rough and Mini Verde ultradwarf greens.

Pinehurst No. 1
| Tee | Rating/Slope | 1 | 2 | 3 | 4 | 5 | 6 | 7 | 8 | 9 | Out | 10 | 11 | 12 | 13 | 14 | 15 | 16 | 17 | 18 | In | Total |
| Blue | 68.4 / 118 | 391 | 401 | 353 | 466 | 173 | 375 | 167 | 366 | 148 | 2840 | 367 | 410 | 222 | 414 | 337 | 352 | 390 | 331 | 426 | 3249 | 6089 |
| White | M:67.4/113 W:73.0/126 | 365 | 391 | 345 | 458 | 143 | 355 | 161 | 338 | 126 | 2682 | 357 | 394 | 218 | 369 | 324 | 345 | 381 | 318 | 418 | 3124 | 5806 |
| Green | M:65.5/109 W:70.8/120 | 365 | 358 | 345 | 422 | 118 | 355 | 143 | 338 | 126 | 2570 | 327 | 394 | 157 | 331 | 324 | 324 | 303 | 318 | 418 | 2896 | 5466 |
| Par | | 4 | 4 | 4 | 5 | 3 | 4 | 3 | 4 | 3 | 34 | 4 | 4 | 3 | 4 | 4 | 4 | 4 | 4 | 5 | 36 | 70 |
| SI | | 3 | 1 | 7 | 17 | 11 | 5 | 15 | 13 | 9 | | 8 | 2 | 10 | 6 | 12 | 14 | 4 | 16 | 18 |
| Red | M:64.1/107 W:69.1/115 | 319 | 358 | 331 | 422 | 118 | 281 | 143 | 249 | 109 | 2330 | 327 | 385 | 136 | 369 | 316 | 324 | 303 | 288 | 389 | 2837 | 5167 |
| Yellow | M:61.0/95 W:63.2/103 | 237 | 358 | 250 | 340 | 90 | 215 | 104 | 249 | 106 | 1949 | 242 | 262 | 136 | 331 | 227 | 235 | 227 | 288 | 300 | 2248 | 4197 |
| Par | Red/Yellow | 4 | 5 | 4 | 5 | 3 | 4 | 3 | 4 | 3 | 35 | 4 | 4 | 3 | 5 | 4 | 4 | 4 | 4 | 5 | 37 | 72 |
| SI | Red/Yellow | 4 | 18 | 2 | 8 | 12 | 6 | 14 | 16 | 10 | | 3 | 1 | 17 | 11 | 5 | 7 | 9 | 15 | 13 |

=== Pinehurst No. 2 ===
Pinehurst No. 2, the best-known course at Pinehurst Resort, was first opened in 1907 and designed by Donald Ross. Pinehurst is considered to be Ross' best work and he continued to perfect it until his death in 1948. The course is famous for its exceptionally difficult green complexes which were a signature of Ross designs, and many of the greens are crowned, causing shots that are short to roll off the green, leaving a difficult chip shot. Johnny Miller once famously compared trying to land a shot on a Pinehurst green as "like trying to hit a ball on top of a VW Beetle". Pinehurst, like many Sandhills courses, was without long rough for much of its early history, but in 1974, a redesign by RT Jones led to the installation of thick bermuda rough throughout the course, which lasted until a restoration in 2010 by Bill Coore and Ben Crenshaw, who removed all of the rough and reshaped the fairways and bunkers to restore the course to its original Ross design. In lieu of rough, golfers now find hardpan sand and native scrub bordering the fairways. The course since its inception has been host to many significant tournaments including 5 men's majors (1936 PGA Championship, and 1999, 2005, 2014, 2024 U.S. Opens). Additional U.S. Opens are scheduled in 2029, 2035, 2041, and 2047 under a partnership with the USGA announced in September 2020 naming Pinehurst as the USGA's first "anchor site". It also hosted the 1951 Ryder Cup and the 2014 U.S. Women's Open played the week after the men's. Not only has the course hosted numerous professional events, but it has also hosted the U.S. Amateur three times (1962, 2008, and 2019). The course is currently grassed with Tifway Bermuda tees and fairways and Champion Ultradwarf greens. For its 2019-2020 course rankings, Golf Digest ranked No. 2 as the 29th best golf course in the United States and the 6th best public course in the country. Golf Magazine for its 2020-2021 rankings named No. 2 as the 11th best course in the country and the best in North Carolina.

The North Carolina Golf Panel has consistently ranked it as the best course in the state, both public and private. A statue of Payne Stewart is beside the 18th green, showing him celebrating his winning putt from the 1999 U.S. Open – his second and final U.S. Open and third and final major championship before his death in October of that year.

Pinehurst No. 2
| Tee | Rating/Slope | 1 | 2 | 3 | 4 | 5 | 6 | 7 | 8 | 9 | Out | 10 | 11 | 12 | 13 | 14 | 15 | 16 | 17 | 18 | In | Total |
| 2024 U.S. Open | / - | 395 | 504 | 387 | 528 | 588 | 228 | 426 | 488 | 184 | 3728 | 617 | 482 | 486 | 381 | 472 | 197 | 530 | 207 | 448 | 3820 | 7548 |
| Par | | 4 | 4 | 4 | 4 | 5 | 3 | 4 | 4 | 3 | 35 | 5 | 4 | 4 | 4 | 4 | 3 | 4 | 3 | 4 | 35 | 70 |
| Blue | 73.7 / 133 | 393 | 439 | 350 | 474 | 508 | 203 | 393 | 469 | 174 | 3403 | 580 | 455 | 419 | 375 | 433 | 183 | 513 | 185 | 415 | 3558 | 6961 |
| White | 70.7 / 126 | 376 | 411 | 330 | 434 | 462 | 178 | 385 | 440 | 148 | 3164 | 455 | 375 | 360 | 358 | 419 | 170 | 478 | 162 | 366 | 3143 | 6307 |
| Par | | 4 | 4 | 4 | 4 | 5 | 3 | 4 | 5 | 3 | 36 | 5 | 4 | 4 | 4 | 4 | 3 | 5 | 3 | 4 | 36 | 72 |
| SI | | 11 | 3 | 9 | 1 | 15 | 5 | 7 | 17 | 13 | | 18 | 8 | 10 | 6 | 2 | 12 | 16 | 14 | 4 |
| Green | M:68.0/123 W:73.3/129 | 366 | 390 | 309 | 326 | 432 | 170 | 313 | 419 | 140 | 2865 | 438 | 358 | 336 | 327 | 347 | 153 | 437 | 152 | 358 | 2906 | 5771 |
| Red | M:65.5/117 W:70.3/127 | 340 | 342 | 283 | 316 | 417 | 116 | 306 | 400 | 124 | 2644 | 421 | 320 | 293 | 278 | 337 | 124 | 411 | 145 | 329 | 2658 | 5302 |
| SI | Green/Red | 9 | 5 | 3 | 1 | 11 | 17 | 13 | 15 | 7 | | 10 | 14 | 12 | 6 | 8 | 18 | 4 | 16 | 2 |

=== Pinehurst No. 3 ===
Pinehurst No. 3, which is by far the shortest 18-hole course at the Resort, was designed by Donald Ross in 1910. The course is known for its very small greens placing a premium on accuracy and ball position, a hallmark of Ross courses. No. 3 underwent minor renovations in 2017 to make room for the new short course "The Cradle," and return the course to a more traditional Pinehurst appearance of sandscape and native scrub with minimal rough. These renovations led by Kye Goalby lowered the par to 68 from 70 and shortened the length of the course. The course is currently grassed with Certified Tifway 419 Bermuda tees, fairways, and rough and Champion Ultradwarf greens.

Pinehurst No. 3
| Tee | Rating/Slope | 1 | 2 | 3 | 4 | 5 | 6 | 7 | 8 | 9 | Out | 10 | 11 | 12 | 13 | 14 | 15 | 16 | 17 | 18 | In | Total |
| White | M:66.1/123 W:71.2/125 | 283 | 119 | 346 | 151 | 296 | 166 | 327 | 111 | 327 | 2126 | 338 | 502 | 196 | 423 | 191 | 328 | 319 | 346 | 386 | 3029 | 5155 |
| Green | M:64.8/118 W:69.2/121 | 263 | 109 | 316 | 124 | 285 | 149 | 304 | 99 | 311 | 1960 | 321 | 458 | 177 | 411 | 177 | 316 | 297 | 336 | 370 | 2863 | 4823 |
| Par | | 4 | 3 | 4 | 3 | 4 | 3 | 4 | 3 | 4 | 32 | 4 | 5 | 3 | 5 | 3 | 4 | 4 | 4 | 4 | 36 | 68 |
| SI | | 11 | 15 | 1 | 7 | 13 | 9 | 5 | 17 | 3 | | 2 | 16 | 6 | 18 | 12 | 14 | 10 | 8 | 4 |
| Red | M:63.0/109 W:66.4/118 | 251 | 98 | 307 | 113 | 276 | 134 | 278 | 83 | 283 | 1823 | 309 | 429 | 124 | 403 | 128 | 296 | 267 | 306 | 262 | 2524 | 4347 |
| Yellow | M:60.4/105 W:63.0/110 | 193 | 60 | 267 | 82 | 187 | 97 | 252 | 76 | 244 | 1458 | 238 | 289 | 119 | 329 | 109 | 256 | 241 | 251 | 252 | 2184 | 3642 |
| SI | Red/Yellow | 13 | 15 | 3 | 11 | 7 | 9 | 1 | 17 | 5 | | 2 | 12 | 14 | 8 | 18 | 6 | 10 | 4 | 16 |

=== Pinehurst No. 4 ===
Pinehurst No. 4, debatable as the second best course at the Resort was originally laid out by Donald Ross in 1919 but has undergone many significant changes in the years since, so significant that Ross is not credited by the Resort as the course's architect. The course was redesigned in 1973 by Robert Trent Jones, in 1982 by Rees Jones and in 1999 by Tom Fazio. Most recently the course reopened in 2018 after a major redesign by Gil Hanse which saw the course stripped of its rough much like No. 2 replacing it instead with native sandscapes. Also removed by Hanse were Fazio's numerous pot bunkers which some considered to be out of place at Pinehurst. No. 4 assisted its sister course No. 2 during the 2008 and 2019 US Amateurs by hosting several rounds in addition to those played on No. 2. Golf Magazine in its 2020-2021 rankings named No. 4 the 92nd best course in the country and the 4th best in North Carolina.

Pinehurst No. 4
| Tee | Rating/Slope | 1 | 2 | 3 | 4 | 5 | 6 | 7 | 8 | 9 | Out | 10 | 11 | 12 | 13 | 14 | 15 | 16 | 17 | 18 | In | Total |
| Orange | 74.9 / 138 | 450 | 512 | 431 | 153 | 489 | 217 | 439 | 409 | 527 | 3627 | 432 | 174 | 453 | 529 | 216 | 398 | 321 | 590 | 487 | 3600 | 7227 |
| Blue | 73.7 / 135 | 420 | 498 | 411 | 140 | 481 | 200 | 421 | 402 | 517 | 3490 | 420 | 165 | 440 | 521 | 207 | 386 | 298 | 573 | 461 | 3471 | 6961 |
| White | M:70.8/131 W:76.9/140 | 404 | 473 | 378 | 119 | 460 | 184 | 404 | 374 | 484 | 3280 | 392 | 137 | 387 | 504 | 179 | 331 | 274 | 536 | 408 | 3148 | 6428 |
| Par | | 4 | 5 | 4 | 3 | 4 | 3 | 4 | 4 | 5 | 36 | 4 | 3 | 4 | 5 | 3 | 4 | 4 | 5 | 4 | 36 | 72 |
| SI | Orange/Blue/White | 7 | 13 | 11 | 17 | 1 | 9 | 3 | 15 | 5 | | 4 | 18 | 10 | 8 | 12 | 16 | 14 | 6 | 2 |
| Green | M:68.5/123 W:73.8/133 | 382 | 443 | 359 | 100 | 355 | 159 | 380 | 350 | 464 | 2992 | 368 | 124 | 360 | 474 | 161 | 245 | 260 | 510 | 376 | 2872 | 5864 |
| Red | M:65.4/116 W:70.1/124 | 319 | 402 | 276 | 83 | 341 | 231 | 356 | 331 | 436 | 2676 | 345 | 102 | 340 | 455 | 115 | 228 | 244 | 426 | 329 | 2584 | 5260 |
| SI | Green/Red | 13 | 9 | 15 | 17 | 1 | 11 | 3 | 7 | 5 | | 2 | 18 | 4 | 8 | 16 | 14 | 12 | 10 | 6 |

=== Pinehurst No. 5 ===
Pinehurst No. 5, which opened in 1961 was designed by Ellis Maples, an understudy of Donald Ross and one of the leading figures in North Carolina golf course architecture. The course differs from the four courses that predate it in that it takes on a more classic parkland style than the traditional rugged courses the Sandhills region is known for. The course is currently grassed with Certified Tifway 419 Bermuda tees, fairways, and rough and Champion Ultradwarf greens.

Pinehurst No. 5
| Tee | Rating/Slope | 1 | 2 | 3 | 4 | 5 | 6 | 7 | 8 | 9 | Out | 10 | 11 | 12 | 13 | 14 | 15 | 16 | 17 | 18 | In | Total |
| Gold | 73.1 / 135 | 412 | 484 | 393 | 428 | 168 | 407 | 374 | 434 | 381 | 3481 | 369 | 386 | 185 | 523 | 188 | 437 | 504 | 384 | 371 | 3347 | 6828 |
| Blue | 72.0 / 132 | 403 | 480 | 352 | 420 | 168 | 403 | 353 | 435 | 372 | 3376 | 363 | 381 | 180 | 511 | 180 | 397 | 497 | 370 | 362 | 3241 | 6617 |
| White | M:69.8/126 W:75.9/136 | 375 | 450 | 327 | 392 | 160 | 391 | 327 | 389 | 363 | 3174 | 334 | 324 | 158 | 479 | 161 | 370 | 471 | 360 | 343 | 3000 | 6174 |
| Green | M:67.4/119 W:73.0/129 | 337 | 443 | 315 | 351 | 141 | 368 | 317 | 338 | 353 | 2963 | 300 | 311 | 138 | 439 | 121 | 350 | 420 | 329 | 314 | 2722 | 5685 |
| Par | | 4 | 5 | 4 | 4 | 3 | 4 | 4 | 4 | 4 | 36 | 4 | 4 | 3 | 5 | 3 | 4 | 5 | 4 | 4 | 36 | 72 |
| SI | | 15 | 7 | 3 | 1 | 17 | 5 | 13 | 11 | 9 | | 2 | 4 | 16 | 6 | 18 | 10 | 14 | 8 | 12 |
| Red | M:64.9/112 W:70.2/121 | 310 | 414 | 289 | 323 | 128 | 319 | 288 | 290 | 315 | 2676 | 292 | 287 | 110 | 415 | 106 | 322 | 407 | 303 | 305 | 2547 | 5223 |
| Yellow | M:61.9/105 W:65.4/121 | 235 | 357 | 289 | 261 | 120 | 234 | 288 | 220 | 285 | 2289 | 210 | 237 | 92 | 340 | 87 | 274 | 347 | 241 | 240 | 2068 | 4357 |
| SI | Red/Yellow | 7 | 13 | 1 | 5 | 17 | 3 | 15 | 11 | 9 | | 2 | 4 | 12 | 18 | 16 | 6 | 14 | 8 | 10 |

=== Pinehurst No. 6 ===
Pinehurst No. 6, designed by George Fazio and his nephew Tom Fazio, opened in 1979 and much like No. 5 before it, deviated from the earlier courses in that it took on a more typical parkland style with numerous lakes and more traditional bunker shapes. Additionally No. 6 was different from the five before it in that it was the first course at the Resort to not play out of the main clubhouse. With the Resort out of room for a new course on the same site as the five other, No. 6 was built several miles away. Tom Fazio made some minor renovations in 2005, including the addition of new bunkers and installing faster greens. The course is currently grassed with Certified Tifway 419 Bermuda tees, fairways, and rough and Champion Ultradwarf greens.

Pinehurst No. 6
| Tee | Rating/Slope | 1 | 2 | 3 | 4 | 5 | 6 | 7 | 8 | 9 | Out | 10 | 11 | 12 | 13 | 14 | 15 | 16 | 17 | 18 | In | Total |
| Gold | 74.7 / 139 | 441 | 537 | 198 | 402 | 415 | 515 | 213 | 385 | 441 | 3547 | 500 | 417 | 413 | 212 | 391 | 499 | 223 | 415 | 436 | 3506 | 7053 |
| Blue | 72.6 / 134 | 411 | 529 | 176 | 379 | 391 | 492 | 171 | 371 | 420 | 3340 | 500 | 398 | 359 | 186 | 368 | 490 | 181 | 387 | 425 | 3294 | 6634 |
| White | 70.7 / 125 | 381 | 515 | 163 | 342 | 366 | 467 | 159 | 344 | 401 | 3138 | 442 | 376 | 344 | 172 | 340 | 465 | 149 | 357 | 397 | 3042 | 6180 |
| Green | M:68.3/120 W:73.5/128 | 355 | 461 | 136 | 310 | 339 | 452 | 151 | 324 | 381 | 2909 | 403 | 355 | 322 | 146 | 313 | 413 | 135 | 332 | 355 | 2774 | 5683 |
| Par | | 4 | 5 | 3 | 4 | 4 | 5 | 3 | 4 | 4 | 36 | 5 | 4 | 4 | 3 | 4 | 5 | 3 | 4 | 4 | 36 | 72 |
| SI | | 9 | 5 | 17 | 1 | 15 | 7 | 11 | 13 | 3 | | 8 | 12 | 2 | 18 | 6 | 14 | 16 | 10 | 4 |
| Red | M:64.3/112 W:69.7/120 | 322 | 422 | 112 | 239 | 324 | 397 | 131 | 294 | 335 | 2576 | 377 | 278 | 269 | 132 | 272 | 399 | 92 | 306 | 291 | 2416 | 4992 |
| Yellow | M:62.2/105 W:65.6/108 | 234 | 330 | 112 | 239 | 240 | 338 | 131 | 275 | 250 | 2149 | 314 | 278 | 200 | 100 | 272 | 340 | 92 | 235 | 220 | 2051 | 4200 |
| SI | Red/Yellow | 5 | 7 | 15 | 17 | 1 | 9 | 13 | 11 | 3 | | 14 | 8 | 4 | 16 | 2 | 10 | 18 | 6 | 12 |

=== Pinehurst No. 7 ===
Pinehurst No. 7 which opened in 1986 was designed by Rees Jones. This course, which was built on the site of a forgotten 9-hole employee course designed by Donald Ross, was the second at the Resort to play from a clubhouse other than the main one, even though No. 7 backs up to several holes on No. 2. The course features some of the most uneven topography of any course at the Resort and is as such a unique experience. Tiger Woods won the Big I Junior Classic in 1992 on No. 7. In 2002 the course underwent minor renovations by its original designer Rees Jones to keep it modern and in premium shape. The course is currently grassed with Certified Tifway 419 Bermuda tees, fairways, and rough and Champion Bermuda greens.

Pinehurst No. 7
| Tee | Rating/Slope | 1 | 2 | 3 | 4 | 5 | 6 | 7 | 8 | 9 | Out | 10 | 11 | 12 | 13 | 14 | 15 | 16 | 17 | 18 | In | Total |
| Gold | 75.6 / 142 | 520 | 462 | 406 | 418 | 205 | 479 | 394 | 543 | 191 | 3618 | 399 | 421 | 525 | 207 | 408 | 435 | 197 | 406 | 600 | 3598 | 7216 |
| Blue | 74.0 / 139 | 493 | 440 | 387 | 405 | 179 | 463 | 365 | 517 | 174 | 3423 | 370 | 395 | 503 | 189 | 388 | 413 | 177 | 392 | 574 | 3401 | 6824 |
| White | 71.7 / 134 | 476 | 411 | 367 | 386 | 145 | 438 | 329 | 495 | 153 | 3200 | 337 | 380 | 464 | 165 | 364 | 387 | 149 | 373 | 528 | 3147 | 6347 |
| Green | M:68.7/121 W:74.1/136 | 460 | 391 | 295 | 340 | 111 | 411 | 291 | 445 | 124 | 2868 | 316 | 323 | 431 | 98 | 337 | 366 | 128 | 352 | 490 | 2841 | 5709 |
| Par | | 5 | 4 | 4 | 4 | 3 | 4 | 4 | 5 | 3 | 36 | 4 | 4 | 5 | 3 | 4 | 4 | 3 | 4 | 5 | 36 | 72 |
| SI | | 5 | 1 | 13 | 11 | 17 | 3 | 9 | 7 | 15 | | 6 | 10 | 4 | 16 | 8 | 14 | 18 | 2 | 12 |
| Red | W:71.3/130 | 420 | 323 | 285 | 322 | 103 | 353 | 261 | 402 | 113 | 2582 | 294 | 286 | 405 | 91 | 314 | 326 | 117 | 308 | 460 | 2601 | 5183 |
| Yellow | M:61.0/108 W:63.6/112 | 318 | 213 | 184 | 217 | 203 | 228 | 215 | 305 | 113 | 1896 | 188 | 229 | 305 | 91 | 203 | 233 | 117 | 217 | 354 | 1937 | 3833 |
| SI | Red/Yellow | 9 | 7 | 15 | 5 | 17 | 11 | 1 | 3 | 13 | | 14 | 12 | 8 | 18 | 4 | 2 | 16 | 10 | 6 |

=== Pinehurst No. 8 ===
Pinehurst No. 8, No. 4's contender for second best at the Resort, was designed by Tom Fazio and opened in 1996 to commemorate the 100th anniversary of Pinehurst. The course is a classic Fazio design which puts a premium on playability with a nod to the tradition of Ross' signatures including many difficult green complexes. The course has the least amount of housing bordering it of any course at the Resort and as such is a more tranquil round, winding through wetlands and forests, earning it a Signature Sanctuary designation from the Audubon Society in 1996. No. 8 has played host to the PGA Club Pro Championship twice and hosted the 2017 US Amateur Four Ball with No. 2. The course is currently grassed with Certified Tifway 419 Bermuda tees, fairways, and rough and Champion Ultradwarf greens. No. 8 has ranked in the Top 100 public courses in the United States.

Pinehurst No. 8
| Tee | Rating/Slope | 1 | 2 | 3 | 4 | 5 | 6 | 7 | 8 | 9 | Out | 10 | 11 | 12 | 13 | 14 | 15 | 16 | 17 | 18 | In | Total |
| Gold | 74.1 / 137 | 361 | 559 | 382 | 464 | 149 | 605 | 370 | 236 | 442 | 3568 | 441 | 579 | 373 | 204 | 404 | 187 | 398 | 500 | 445 | 3531 | 7099 |
| Blue | 72.3 / 131 | 334 | 532 | 374 | 437 | 138 | 585 | 346 | 204 | 416 | 3366 | 416 | 573 | 353 | 181 | 363 | 165 | 368 | 489 | 420 | 3328 | 6694 |
| White | M:70.3/128 W:76.8/141 | 316 | 502 | 358 | 408 | 115 | 565 | 323 | 181 | 392 | 3160 | 387 | 550 | 335 | 165 | 363 | 145 | 325 | 464 | 417 | 3151 | 6311 |
| Green | M:68.0/121 W:73.7/131 | 302 | 492 | 339 | 379 | 98 | 453 | 313 | 155 | 328 | 2859 | 358 | 513 | 297 | 132 | 352 | 131 | 311 | 456 | 396 | 2946 | 5805 |
| Par | | 4 | 5 | 4 | 4 | 3 | 5 | 4 | 3 | 4 | 36 | 4 | 5 | 4 | 3 | 4 | 3 | 4 | 5 | 4 | 36 | 72 |
| SI | | 15 | 9 | 11 | 5 | 17 | 1 | 13 | 7 | 3 | | 6 | 4 | 18 | 12 | 8 | 16 | 10 | 14 | 2 |
| Red | W:70.4/124 | 281 | 418 | 301 | 338 | 94 | 450 | 271 | 81 | 323 | 2557 | 339 | 429 | 289 | 126 | 307 | 125 | 286 | 399 | 296 | 2596 | 5153 |
| SI | Red/ | 11 | 7 | 9 | 1 | 15 | 3 | 13 | 17 | 5 | | 2 | 6 | 16 | 14 | 4 | 18 | 10 | 12 | 8 |

=== Pinehurst No. 9 ===
Pinehurst No. 9, which opened in 1988 and was designed by Jack Nicklaus, was originally a private club known as "National Golf Club" separate from the Resort, but was purchased by Pinehurst in 2014, and became No. 9, available just like all the other courses to Resort guests. The course is a true Nicklaus original with all the hallmarks, including lush playing conditions and tricky greens. As with the others newer than No. 5, No. 9 plays out of its own clubhouse but is not far from the main resort, sitting just across the road from No. 7. The course underwent minor renovations in 2012 to keep it up to date and the course is currently grassed with Certified Tifway 419 Bermuda tees, fairways, and rough and Penn A-1/A-4 creeping bentgrass greens, the only course at the resort with bentgrass greens.

Pinehurst No. 9
| Tee | Rating/Slope | 1 | 2 | 3 | 4 | 5 | 6 | 7 | 8 | 9 | Out | 10 | 11 | 12 | 13 | 14 | 15 | 16 | 17 | 18 | In | Total |
| Gold | 74.8 / 143 | 411 | 190 | 404 | 572 | 431 | 421 | 419 | 536 | 176 | 3560 | 515 | 423 | 175 | 437 | 417 | 530 | 384 | 219 | 446 | 3546 | 7106 |
| Blue | 72.5 / 139 | 394 | 180 | 364 | 548 | 389 | 389 | 373 | 503 | 160 | 3300 | 490 | 390 | 160 | 396 | 402 | 503 | 357 | 195 | 414 | 3307 | 6607 |
| White | 70.5 / 132 | 375 | 168 | 327 | 527 | 375 | 361 | 355 | 488 | 142 | 3118 | 457 | 337 | 151 | 349 | 375 | 479 | 317 | 179 | 385 | 3029 | 6147 |
| Green | M:68.00/121 W:72.6/130 | 296 | 161 | 304 | 498 | 342 | 316 | 320 | 453 | 122 | 2812 | 423 | 314 | 132 | 326 | 329 | 404 | 309 | 148 | 341 | 2726 | 5538 |
| Par | | 4 | 3 | 4 | 5 | 4 | 4 | 4 | 5 | 3 | 36 | 5 | 4 | 3 | 4 | 4 | 5 | 4 | 3 | 4 | 36 | 72 |
| SI | | 5 | 13 | 7 | 1 | 3 | 11 | 9 | 15 | 17 | | 10 | 14 | 18 | 6 | 2 | 12 | 8 | 16 | 4 |
| Red | W:69.8/121 | 270 | 102 | 269 | 414 | 307 | 310 | 275 | 386 | 91 | 2424 | 370 | 291 | 101 | 277 | 318 | 359 | 268 | 139 | 332 | 2455 | 4879 |
| Yellow | M:60.4/106 W:63.2/107 | 231 | 102 | 221 | 274 | 202 | 219 | 218 | 306 | 91 | 1864 | 276 | 237 | 101 | 215 | 214 | 300 | 174 | 139 | 247 | 1903 | 3767 |
| SI | Red/Yellow | 13 | 17 | 7 | 1 | 5 | 9 | 11 | 3 | 15 | | 2 | 12 | 18 | 8 | 6 | 4 | 14 | 16 | 10 |

=== The Cradle ===
The Cradle is a 9-hole par 3 course designed by Gil Hanse; it opened in 2017 and is Pinehurst's shortest course.

The Cradle
| Tee | Rating/Slope | 1 | 2 | 3 | 4 | 5 | 6 | 7 | 8 | 9 | Total |
| Yardage | | 113 | 85 | 66 | 127 | 56 | 58 | 92 | 80 | 112 | 789 |
| Par | | 3 | 3 | 3 | 3 | 3 | 3 | 3 | 3 | 3 | 27 |

=== Pinehurst No. 10 ===
Pinehurst Number 10 started construction in 2023 and opened in 2024. Golf architects Tom Doak and Angela Moser led the design. The site is the former location of The Pit Golf Course.

Pinehurst No. 10
| Tee | Rating/Slope | 1 | 2 | 3 | 4 | 5 | 6 | 7 | 8 | 9 | Out | 10 | 11 | 12 | 13 | 14 | 15 | 16 | 17 | 18 | In | Total |
| Blue | 74.1 / 142 | 447 | 182 | 555 | 342 | 400 | 489 | 150 | 385 | 468 | 3418 | 634 | 182 | 544 | 508 | 264 | 385 | 477 | 175 | 433 | 3602 | 7020 |
| White | 71.5 / 137 | 400 | 163 | 532 | 308 | 374 | 437 | 122 | 357 | 439 | 3132 | 585 | 170 | 494 | 483 | 224 | 361 | 443 | 142 | 405 | 3307 | 6439 |
| Green | M:68.2/129 W:73.5/140 | 351 | 129 | 492 | 300 | 348 | 415 | 100 | 268 | 431 | 2834 | 536 | 147 | 450 | 448 | 213 | 353 | 352 | 107 | 345 | 2951 | 5785 |
| Par | | 4 | 3 | 5 | 4 | 4 | 4 | 3 | 4 | 4 | 35 | 5 | 3 | 5 | 4 | 3 | 4 | 4 | 3 | 4 | 35 | 70 |
| SI | | 5 | 13 | 11 | 15 | 9 | 1 | 17 | 7 | 3 | | 6 | 14 | 16 | 2 | 10 | 12 | 4 | 18 | 8 |
| Red | M:64.3/117 W:69.0/124 | 336 | 100 | 443 | 260 | 306 | 364 | 82 | 242 | 309 | 2442 | 428 | 123 | 415 | 344 | 174 | 319 | 312 | 101 | 327 | 2543 | 4985 |
| SI | Women | 3 | 15 | 9 | 13 | 7 | 1 | 17 | 11 | 5 | | 14 | 16 | 6 | 2 | 10 | 8 | 12 | 18 | 4 |

== Croquet ==
Pinehurst is also the home of three championship croquet courts and a lawn bowling court. Players from around the country are attracted to this resort to play six wicket championship croquet. Mack Penwell is a US national champion, member of the United States Croquet Association hall of fame and, now retired, croquet professional at Pinehurst resort. Ron Lloyd took over as the croquet professional in 2004.

In May 2015 Pinehurst hosted the Solomon Trophy, the international match between teams representing the USA and Great Britain.

== See also ==
- List of Historic Hotels of America
- Country Club of North Carolina
