= Pinehurst, North Carolina =

- Village
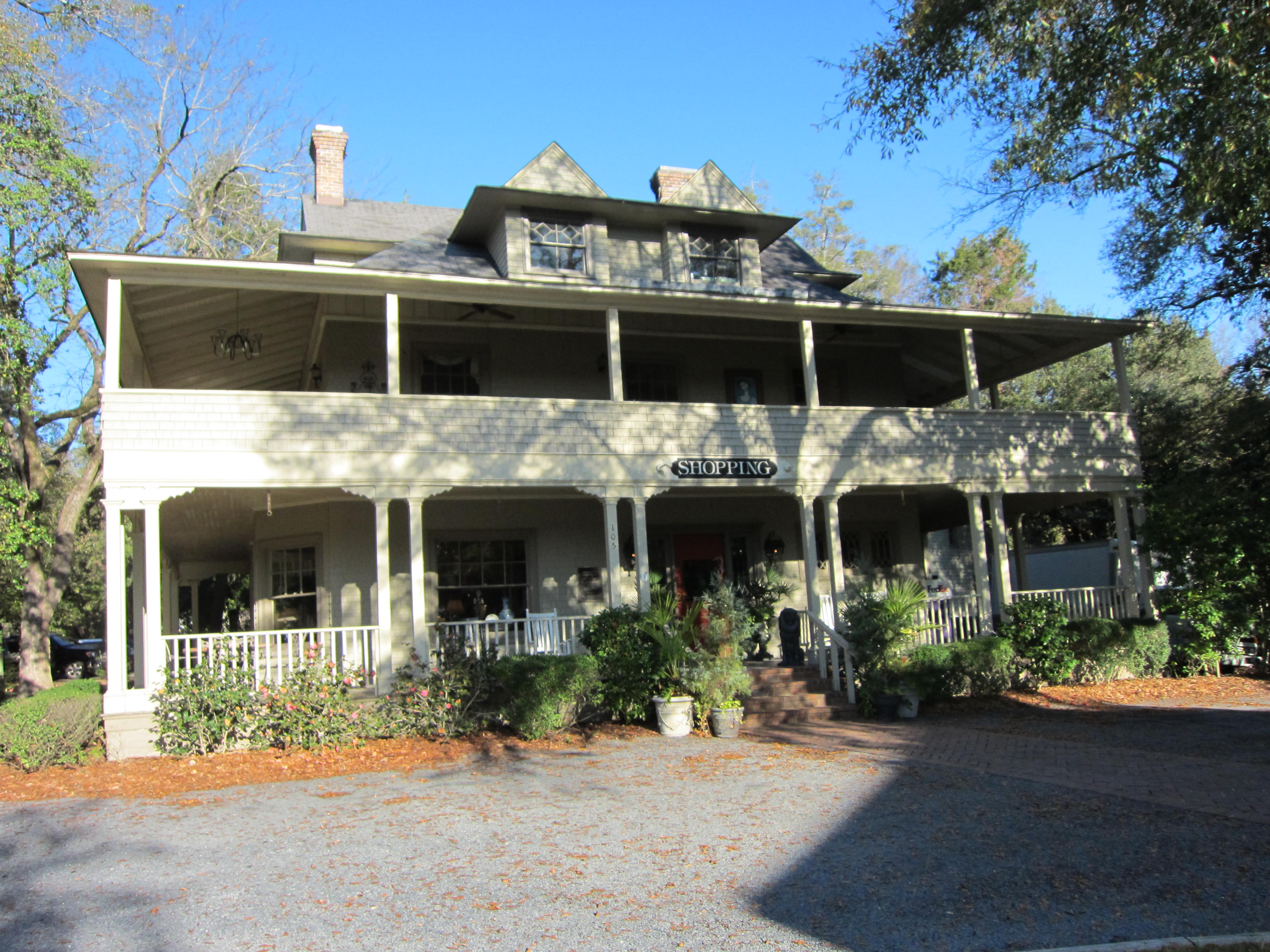
- Mystic Cottage (1900), historic building in the district

- Seal
- Nickname: "Home of American Golf"
- Location in Moore County and the state of North Carolina
- Coordinates: 35°11′32″N 79°28′06″W
- Country: United States
- State: North Carolina
- County: Moore
- Founded: 1895
- Incorporated: 1980
- Named for: Its location in a pine forest

Government
  - Mayor: Patrick Pizzella

Area
  - Village: 17.36 sq mi (44.95 km^{2})
  - Land: 16.71 sq mi (43.28 km^{2})
  - Water: 0.65 sq mi (1.68 km^{2})
- Elevation: 509 ft (155 m)

Population (2020)
  - Village: 17,581
  - Density: 1,052.2/sq mi (406.24/km^{2})
  - Urban: 50,319 (Pinehurst–Southern Pines) (US: 506th)
  - Urban density: 1,059.6/sq mi (409.1/km^{2})
- Time zone: UTC-5 (Eastern (EST))
  - Summer (DST): UTC-4 (EDT)
- ZIP codes: 28370, 28374
- Area codes: 910, 472
- FIPS code: 37-51940
- GNIS feature ID: 2407523
- Website: www.vopnc.org
- Pinehurst Historic District
- U.S. National Register of Historic Places
- U.S. National Historic Landmark District
- Area: 250 acres (100 ha)
- Built: 1895
- Architect: Frederick Law Olmsted
- Architectural style: Colonial Revival, Queen Anne
- NRHP reference No.: 73001361

Significant dates
- Added to NRHP: August 14, 1973
- Designated NHLD: June 19, 1996

Pinehurst, officially The Village of Pinehurst, is a village in Moore County, North Carolina, United States. As of the 2020 census, the population was 17,581, up from 13,124 in 2010. "Pinehurst" refers to both the village and the Pinehurst Resort, a golf resort, which has hosted multiple U.S. Open championships in the sport. A large portion of the central village, including the resort complexes, is a National Historic Landmark District, designated in 1996 for its landscape design by Frederick Law Olmsted and its significance in the history of golf in the United States. Pinehurst has been designated as the "Home of American Golf" by the US Golf Association and by the state of North Carolina. The surrounding area is known for its strong equestrian community, including the former Stoneybrook Steeplechase, and the current Pinehurst Harness Track. Fox hunting is also a common sport in the area.

The Pinehurst Resort is one of three designated anchor sites for the men's US Open in Golf. Since 1999, the resort has hosted the event four times, most recently in 2024. The US Open will return to Pinehurst in 2029, 2035, 2041, and 2047.

Golf House Pinehurst, which opened in 2024, hosts the World Golf Hall of Fame. In addition to the Pinehurst Resort, the village is home to the Country Club of North Carolina. In the immediate area surrounding Pinehurst, there are more than 40 other golf courses, including the Pine Needles Lodge and Golf Club in the adjacent town of Southern Pines, which itself has hosted the U.S. Open tournament in women's golf four times.

For several years in the late 2010s-early 2020s, the Pinehurst-Southern Pines area was continuously ranked by POLICOM as the best micropolitan area to live in North Carolina, and a top ten micropolitan area nationwide. Contributing factors included the quality of local amenities, as well as the strong medical and golf tourism industries. As of July 2023, Pinehurst and Southern Pines were re-designated as the Pinehurst-Southern Pines Metropolitan Statistical Area by the Office of Management and Budget.

== History ==
In 1895, James Walker Tufts purchased 500 acres (200 ha), and eventually purchased an additional 5,500 acres (2,200 ha), of land for approximately $1.25 per acre in the North Carolina Sandhills, with the vision of building a "health resort for people of modest means". Tufts retained Frederick Law Olmsted to design the village, which features curving lanes and a picturesque central green.

Originally a health retreat titled "Tuftstown" and also "Pinealia" during construction stages in 1895, it expanded and was renamed Pinehurst by December of that year. The name was suggested in a public contest to name a new development in Martha's Vineyard; as it was not selected, Tufts decided to re-appropriate the name for use at his new development in the South. The village saw its first guests in January 1896.

The first golf course at Pinehurst Resort was laid out in 1897–1898. The first championship held at Pinehurst was the United North and South Amateur Championship of 1901. The best known course, Pinehurst No. 2, was designed by Donald Ross and completed in 1907. Pinehurst Race Track was established in 1915. In 1980, the village became a municipality.

In 1999, National Public Radio reported that many local business owners in Pinehurst were upset because the Pinehurst Resort was using lawsuits to prevent local businesses from using the term "Pinehurst" in the names of their businesses. The village council sought a written guarantee from the Pinehurst Resort that it would not force any business in the village to remove the name "Pinehurst" from its name unless the business is a direct competitor. The request came a week later in a local newspaper. The village also sued the resort over control of the name shared between the resort and village. In the quarter century of growth since, the relationship between the village and the resort has been amicable and mutually beneficial. As the village and resort are geographically intertwined, it is permissible to operate a registered golf cart on public roads throughout the village.

The Lloyd-Howe House, Pinehurst Historic District and Pinehurst Race Track are listed on the National Register of Historic Places.

== Geography ==
Pinehurst is in southern Moore County, bordered to the east by Southern Pines, to the south by Aberdeen, and to the north by Taylortown. It is 43 miles (69 km) by road west-northwest of Fayetteville, 70 miles (110 km) southwest of Raleigh, and 74 miles (119 km) south-southeast of Greensboro.

U.S. Routes 15 and 501 pass together through the eastern side of the village, leading south 5 miles (8 km) to Aberdeen and north 10 miles (16 km) to Carthage, the Moore county seat. North Carolina Highway 2 has its western terminus in the center of Pinehurst and leads east 5 miles (8 km) to its eastern terminus at U.S. Route 1 in Southern Pines. NC Highway 5 has its northern terminus at in the northern part of Pinehurst and leads southeast through the center of the village, ending 6 miles (10 km) to the southeast at US 1-15-501 in Aberdeen. NC Highway 211 crosses the northern and eastern sides of Pinehurst, leading south with Routes 15-501 to Aberdeen and northwest 18 miles (29 km) to Candor.

The village of Pinehurst has a total area of 17.37 square miles (45.0 km^{2}), of which 16.72 square miles (43.3 km^{2}) are land and 0.65 square miles (1.7 km^{2}), or 3.72%, are water. Three streams, Aberdeen Creek, Horse Creek, and Joes Fork, have their headwaters in the Pinehurst area. Aberdeen Creek and Horse Creeks are within the Lumber River watershed, while Joes Fork is within the Cape Fear River watershed.

== Demographics ==
Historical population
Census	Pop.	Note	%±
1950	1,016		—
1960	1,124		10.6%
1970	1,056		−6.0%
1990	5,103		—
2000	9,706		90.2%
2010	13,124		35.2%
2020	17,581		34.0%
U.S. Decennial Census

=== 2020 census ===
Pinehurst racial composition
Race	Number	Percentage
White (non-Hispanic)	15,190	86.4%
Black or African American (non-Hispanic)	555	3.16%
Native American	75	0.43%
Asian	381	2.17%
Pacific Islander	7	0.04%
Other/Mixed	682	3.88%
Hispanic or Latino	691	3.93%

As of the 2020 census, Pinehurst had a population of 17,581, with 4,991 families residing in the village.

The median age was 57.2 years. 16.8% of residents were under the age of 18 and 39.2% of residents were 65 years of age or older. For every 100 females there were 90.8 males, and for every 100 females age 18 and over there were 88.5 males age 18 and over.

98.8% of residents lived in urban areas, while 1.2% lived in rural areas.

There were 7,894 households in Pinehurst, of which 20.6% had children under the age of 18 living in them. Of all households, 62.2% were married-couple households, 11.8% were households with a male householder and no spouse or partner present, and 22.9% were households with a female householder and no spouse or partner present. About 26.9% of all households were made up of individuals and 17.7% had someone living alone who was 65 years of age or older.

There were 9,363 housing units, of which 15.7% were vacant. The homeowner vacancy rate was 1.9% and the rental vacancy rate was 23.7%.

=== Income and poverty ===
The median income for a household in the village was $92,342, and the median income for a family was $108,433. About 2.2% of families were below the poverty line.

=== Demographic estimates ===
As of 2023, there were 17,992 people, 8,330 households, and 5,333 families residing in the village.

== Notable people ==
- Donna Andrews, professional LPGA golfer, six-time tournament winner including the Nabisco Dinah Shore
- Rick Azar, television sports anchor (WKBW-TV) and radio play-by-play announcer of the Buffalo Bills
- Brian Bass, MLB pitcher
- Bill Beutel, news reporter and anchor for ABC News and WABC-TV in New York City, resided in Pinehurst following his retirement from broadcast journalism
- Charles E. Brady Jr., physician, captain in the U.S. Navy, and NASA astronaut
- Del Cameron, Hall of Fame harness racing driver and trainer
- Joseph Patrick Dwyer, United States Army soldier and medic
- Ruth La'Ontra, gospel singer
- Seth Maness, professional baseball player for the St. Louis Cardinals
- George C. Marshall, U.S. Army chief of staff, secretary of state, and secretary of defense
- Vince McMahon, professional wrestling promoter and former owner of World Wrestling Entertainment (WWE)
- William H. McRaven, U.S. Navy admiral
- Fred Pickler, actor, author and former deputy
- Larry Ray (born 1959), criminal convicted of sex trafficking, extortion, forced labor, and other offenses, sentenced to 60 years in prison
- Carson Abel Roberts, U.S. Marine Corps lieutenant general
- Tony Terry, R&B singer
- James Twitty (c. 1916–1994) painter

== See also ==
- National Register of Historic Places listings in Moore County, North Carolina
- List of National Historic Landmarks in North Carolina
