= 1930 Open Championship =

1930 golf tournament held at the Royal Liverpool Golf Club, Hoylake, Wirral, England

Coordinates: 53.385°N 3.190°W

Tournament information
- Dates: 18–20 June 1930
- Location: Hoylake, England
- Course: Royal Liverpool Golf Club

Statistics
- Par: 72
- Length: 6,750 yards (6,172 m)
- Field: 112 players, 61 after cut
- Cut: 158 (+14)
- Prize fund: £400
- Winner's share: (£100)

Champion
- (United States) Bobby Jones (a)
- 291 (+3)

Location in England
Royal Liverpool Golf Club in Hoylake, Merseyside, west of Liverpool, England

The 1930 Open Championship was the 65th Open Championship, held 18–20 June at Royal Liverpool Golf Club in Hoylake, England. Bobby Jones won his third Open Championship title, two strokes ahead of runners-up Leo Diegel and Macdonald Smith, on his way to the single-season Grand Slam.

Qualifying took place on 16–17 June, Monday and Tuesday, with 18 holes at Royal Liverpool and 18 holes at Wallasey, and the top 100 and ties qualified. Archie Compston led the field with 141; the qualifying score was 158 (+14) and 112 players advanced. Prize money was increased sixty per cent, from £250 to £400.

Jones arrived in Hoylake after winning the British Amateur championship in late May. He opened with 70 on Wednesday, in a tie for the lead with Henry Cotton and Smith. Jones followed with a 72 on Thursday to take a one-stroke lead over Fred Robson after 36 holes. The top 60 and ties would make the cut and qualify for the final 36 holes; it was at 158 (+14) and 61 advanced.

Archie Compston's third round score of 68 on Friday morning gave him a one-shot lead over Jones heading to the final round, but he then collapsed with an 82 in the afternoon and finished in sixth. Jones also struggled on the round, but a brilliant bunker shot on the 16th to within inches of the hole helped him card a 75 and a clubhouse lead of 291 (+3). Diegel was tied with Jones after the 13th, but he dropped shots at 14 and 16 and finished two behind. Smith came to the 17th needing to play the final two holes in no worse than six shots to tie Jones, but he missed his putt for a three and tied Diegel for second place.

Jones became the first player since John Ball in 1890 to win both the British Amateur and British Open in the same year. Returning to the United States with the first two jewels of the Grand Slam, he completed the feat by winning the U.S. Open in July and the U.S. Amateur in late September at Merion. Jones then retired from competitive golf at age 28 and never played in the Open Championship again; through 2016, he remains the last amateur to win it.

Jones' win ended a stretch where American-born golfers won ten consecutive major championships. This is the third longest winning streak in majors for American-born golfers after streaks that ended in 1947 and 1977.

Four-time winner and two-time defending champion Walter Hagen did not enter. Arnaud Massy, the 1907 champion, played in his final Open at age 52 and missed the cut by a stroke.

== Course ==
Hole	Name	Yards	Par	Hole	Name	Yards	Par
1	Course	415	4	10	Dee	410	4
2	Road	369	4	11	Alps	193	3
3	Long	480	5	12	Hilbre	401	4
4	New	158	3	13	Rushes	160	3
5	Telegraph	418	4	14	Field	511	5
6	Briars	383	4	15	Lake	443	4
7	Dowie	200	3	16	Dun	532	5
8	Far	482	5	17	Royal	394	4
9	Punch Bowl	393	4	18	Stand	408	4
Out		3,298	36	In		3,452	36
Source:				Total		6,750	72

== Round summaries ==
=== First round ===
Wednesday, 18 June 1930

Place	Player	Score	To par
T1	(England) Henry Cotton	70	−2
T1	(United States) Bobby Jones (a)	70	−2
T1	(United States) Macdonald Smith	70	−2
T4	(England) Jim Barnes	71	−1
T4	(England) Fred Robson	71	−1
T6	(United States) Horton Smith	72	E
T6	(England) Norman Sutton	72	E
T8	(France) Auguste Boyer	73	+1
T8	(Wales) Tom Green	73	+1
T10	(England) Archie Compston	74	+2
T10	(United States) Leo Diegel	74	+2
T10	(Wales) Bert Hodson	74	+2
T10	(United States) Don Moe (a)	74	+2
T10	(England) Philip Rodgers	74	+2
T10	(England) Charles Whitcombe	74	+2

=== Second round ===
Thursday, 19 June 1930

Place	Player	Score	To par
1	(United States) Bobby Jones (a)	70-72=142	−2
2	(England) Fred Robson	71-72=143	−1
3	(United States) Horton Smith	72-72=144	E
T4	(England) Archie Compston	74-73=147	+3
T4	(United States) Leo Diegel	74-73=147	+3
T4	(United States) Don Moe (a)	74-73=147	+3
T4	(England) Philip Rodgers	74-73=147	+3
T4	(United States) Macdonald Smith	70-77=147	+3
9	(England) Jim Barnes	71-77=148	+4
T10	(England) Percy Alliss	75-74=149	+5
T10	(England) Henry Cotton	70-79=149	+5
T10	(England) Charles Whitcombe	74-75=149	+5

=== Third round ===
Friday, 20 June 1930 (morning)

Place	Player	Score	To par
1	(England) Archie Compston	74-73-68=215	−1
2	(United States) Bobby Jones (a)	70-72-74=216	E
3	(United States) Leo Diegel	74-73-71=218	+2
T4	(England) Jim Barnes	71-77-72=220	+4
T4	(France) Auguste Boyer	73-77-70=220	+4
6	(United States) Macdonald Smith	70-77-75=222	+6
T7	(England) Tom Barber	75-76-72=223	+7
T7	(United States) Don Moe (a)	74-73-76=223	+7
T7	(England) Philip Rodgers	74-73-76=223	+7
T7	(England) Reg Whitcombe	78-72-73=223	+7

=== Final round ===
Friday, 20 June 1930 (afternoon)

Place	Player	Score	To par	Money (£)
1	(United States) Bobby Jones (a)	70-72-74-75=291	+3	0
T2	(United States) Leo Diegel	74-73-71-75=293	+5	87; 10s
T2	(United States) Macdonald Smith	70-77-75-71=293	+5	87; 10s
T4	(England) Fred Robson	71-72-78-75=296	+8	37; 10s
T4	(United States) Horton Smith	72-73-78-73=296	+8	37; 10s
T6	(England) Jim Barnes	71-77-72-77=297	+9	17; 10s
T6	(England) Archie Compston	74-73-68-82=297	+9	17; 10s
8	(England) Henry Cotton	70-79-77-73=299	+11	15
T9	(England) Tom Barber	75-76-72-77=300	+12	10
T9	(France) Auguste Boyer	73-77-70-80=300	+12	10
T9	(England) Charles Whitcombe	74-75-72-79=300	+12	10

Amateurs: Jones (+3), Moe (+15), L. Hartley (+23), Sutton (+29), Tolley (+29),
Bentley (+30), Oppenheimer (+33), Souley (+34).
