= William Breck Torrance =

Scottish golfer

Personal information
- Nationality: Scotland
- Born: 1888 Edinburgh, Scotland
- Died: 25 July 1956 (aged 67) Edinburgh, Scotland

Career
- Sport: Golf
- Status: Amateur

Best results in major championships
- Masters Tournament: DNP
- PGA Championship: DNP
- U.S. Open: DNP
- The Open Championship: T10: 1927

William Breck Torrance (1888 – 25 July 1956) was a Scottish amateur golfer who played in the early 20th century.

== Early life ==
In 1888, Torrance was born in Edinburgh. His younger brother, Tony, was also a noted amateur golfer.

== Golf career ==
The 1927 Open Championship was the 62nd Open Championship, held 13–15 July at the Old Course at St Andrews in St Andrews, Scotland. Amateur Bobby Jones successfully defended the title with a dominating six stroke victory. Torrance's best performance came at the event where he tied for a tenth place finish.

== Death ==
Torrance died suddenly at his home in Edinburgh on 25 July 1956.

== Team appearances ==
- Walker Cup (representing Great Britain): 1922
- England–Scotland Amateur Match (representing Scotland): 1922 (winners), 1923 (winners), 1924, 1926, 1927 (tie), 1928, 1930
- Ireland–Scotland Amateur Match (representing Scotland): 1928 (winners), 1929 (winners), 1930 (tie)
