= Roland Vickers =

English golfer

Personal information
- Full name: Roland D. Vickers
- Nationality: England
- Born: 1896 Farnworth, Lancashire, England
- Died: 21 January 1947 (aged 50) Hull, Yorkshire, England

Career
- Sport: Golf
- Status: Professional

Best results in major championships
- Masters Tournament: DNP
- PGA Championship: DNP
- U.S. Open: DNP
- The Open Championship: T10: 1927

Roland D. Vickers (1896 – 21 January 1947) was an English professional golfer who played in the early 20th century. Vickers' best performance came in the 1927 Open Championship when he tied for tenth place. He finished tied for 31st in 1933, his last appearance in the Open. In press reports he is always called "R D Vickers" but official documents do not include a middle name.

== Early life ==
Vickers was born in Farnworth, Lancashire in late 1896. He was the son of George Ellis Vickers and his wife Sarah. George worked as a greenkeeper at Farnworth Golf Club.

Vickers served in France during World War I. He was blown up at an observation post and later severely gassed.

== Golf career ==
After World War I, Vickers was at Chadderton Golf Club in Chadderton, north of Manchester. In 1922 he became the professional at Heswall Golf Club in Heswall on the Wirral Peninsula, moving to Hull Golf Club, in Hull, Yorkshire in 1932, where he remained until his death.

He won the Liverpool and District Professional Championship in 1923, 1924 and 1928. In 1923 he won the Northern section qualifying for the News of the World Matchplay. In 1924 he had a top-10 finish in the Daily Mail Tournament. It was also reported that he held a long-driving record having finished 15 yards past the pin on the 374 yard first hole at Heswall on 21 May 1923.

=== 1927 Open Championship ===
The 1927 Open Championship was the 62nd Open Championship, held 13–15 July at the Old Course at St Andrews in St Andrews, Scotland. Amateur Bobby Jones successfully defended the title with a dominating six stroke victory, the second of his three victories at the Open Championship. Vickers carded rounds of 75-75-77-73=300, the final round 73 being one of the better scores from the final round. He took home £8 in prize money.

== Results in major championships ==
| Tournament | 1923 | 1924 | 1925 | 1926 | 1927 | 1928 | 1929 | 1930 | 1931 | 1932 | 1933 |
|---|---|---|---|---|---|---|---|---|---|---|---|
| The Open Championship | T78 | | 39 | WD | T10 | CUT | | | | | T31 |

Note: Vickers only played in the Open Championship.

Top 10
Did not play

WD = withdrew
CUT = missed the half-way cut
"T" indicates a tie for a place

== Personal life ==
Vickers married Marion Phoebe Turner (1901-1972) in 1931. He had one child.

== Death ==
Vickers died in Hull Royal Infirmary on 21 January 1947 aged 50.
