= Brae Burn Country Club =

Golf course in Newton, Massachusetts

Coordinates: 42°20′18.67″N 71°14′2.50″W

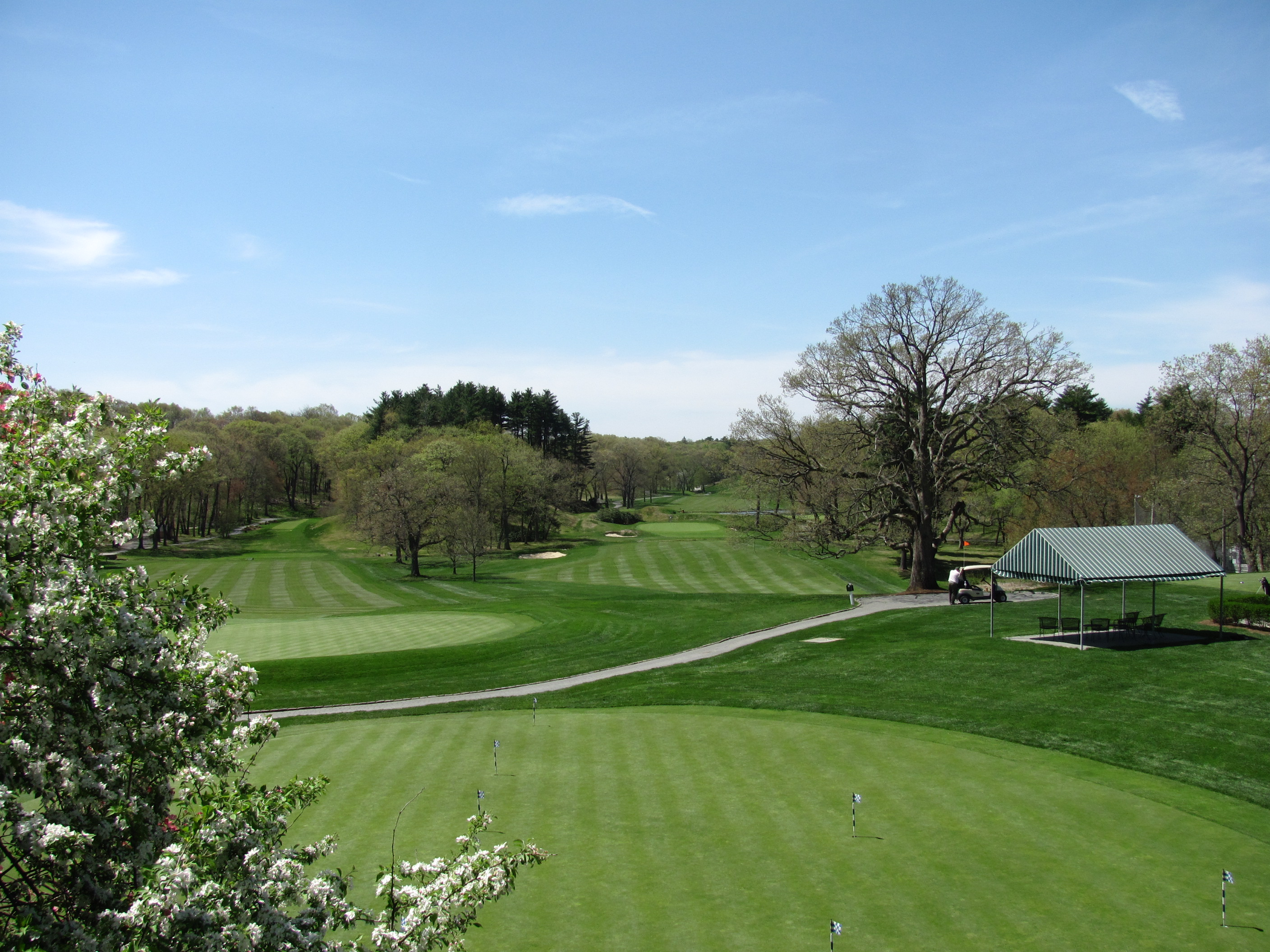
- Brae Burn County Club
- Interactive map of Brae Burn Country Club

Club information
- Location: Newton, Massachusetts
- Established: 1897
- Type: Private
- Total holes: 27
- Tournaments: Massachusetts Amateur: 1906, 1910, 1912, 1914, 1923, 1926, 1935, 1950, 1969, 1991, 2021; U.S. Women's Amateur: 1906, 1975, 1997; Massachusetts Open: 1907, 1913, 1916, 1930, 1979; U.S. Open: 1919; U.S. Amateur: 1928; New England Amateur: 1946, 1963; Curtis Cup: 1958, 1970; U.S. Women's Mid-Amateur: 2024
- Website: www.braeburngolf.com
- Designed by: Donald Ross
- Par: 72
- Length: 6,724 (championship tees)
- Course rating: 74.7
- Course record: 64 – Nick Maccario

Brae Burn Country Club is a country club located in Newton, Massachusetts. Brae Burn was originally a six-hole golf course but quickly evolved into a nine-hole course and then a full 18-hole course. In 1912 and 1928, Donald Ross re-designed the course, convincing the USGA to host the 1919 U.S. Open and 1928 U.S. Amateur at the club. The course has been largely stable since then other than some modifications by Geoffrey Cornish in the 1960s. In the early 21st century, however, Brae Burn has been the source of a controversy regarding alleged "generous tax breaks" they have received from the Commonwealth of Massachusetts though Brae Burn has noted this exemption has been legal since the 1930s.

== History ==
The Brae Burn course was built in 1897. Early in the year the Boston Evening Transcript announced, "Grounds have already been secured and work on the course is under way." There were supposed to be around 80 original members. The club's first president was Mr. George Phelps. Brae Burn Golf Club opened on May 12, 1897. The course was built during "a golf course building boom" in Newton, Massachusetts during the late 1890s. Six courses, including Brae Burn and Woodland Golf Club, were built in town during this era. The course is referred to as Brae Burn in honor of golf's Scottish heritage. There are many meadows and brooks on the course and in the Scots language "brae" means a bank against a valley and "burn" refers to a stream. In March 1898, the club was "elected to allied membership" to the United States Golf Association (USGA). The following year, the first clubhouse was constructed.

Brae Burn was originally six-hole course. However, it soon evolved into a nine-hole course. In 1901, The Boston Post suggested that Brae Burn and Woodland Golf Club could merge their nine-hole courses into one 18-hole course. There were several nine-hole courses in Newton but no full-length courses. In 1903, this almost became a reality. In March, the USGA reported that the courses intended to combine "with a subsidiary nine-hole course for beginners" too. However, at the last minute, Brae Burn rejected this idea. At the annual meeting, held in December, the committee voted to extend the course to 18 holes. The course had 135 acres to work with which helped facilitate this expansion. The course would be 6,007 yards. The committee also announced that they intended to expand the venue from a golf club to a country club. The members wanted to add winter sports like skating and tobogan. Summer sports like tennis and archery were possible additions. A new clubhouse was intended to be completed in the spring of 1904. Also during the spring, the club voted to change its name from Brae Burn Golf Club to Brae Burn Country Club. In addition, they voted to limit membership to 300 members; however, this was an expansion from the original 100 members list.

During the era, the club also received media attention for other activities at the club. Brae Burn started hosting ice skating festivals during this time. During the first decade of the 20th century, Brae Burn started The Boston Hockey League in conjunction with Winchester Country Club. Curling and skiing were also popular winter sports.

Shortly thereafter, Brae Burn started hosting notable golf tournaments. In the fall of 1906, the club hosted the U.S. Women's Amateur. It was their first USGA championship. It was won by Harriot Curtis. Two years later, her sister, Margaret Curtis, won the Massachusetts Women's Amateur held at the club. In 1912, the famed golf course architect Donald Ross re-designed the course in preparation for the Massachusetts Amateur. In the middle of the summer, the course hosted the tournament. In the finals, Heinrich Schmitt defeated Francis Ouimet 1 up. Two years later, Brae Burn hosted the event again. Ouimet won this time. In 1916, Brae Burn hosted the Massachusetts Open again, now a PGA Tour-level event. Boston's Mike Brady defeated Ireland's Pat Doyle in a playoff.

In January 1917, the United States Golf Association (USGA) announced that Brae Burn would host the 1917 U.S. Open. However, the event had to be delayed two years due to World War I. In June 1919, Brae Burn held the 1919 U.S. Open. Brae Burn's greenskeeper spent much time preparing the course for the event. One of his changes was to make the fairways narrower. Meanwhile, the USGA decided to set tees as far back as possible. The tournament is best remembered as a duel between Mike Brady and Walter Hagen. Brady took the solo second and third round leads. However, Brady played poorly in the final round, ultimately shooting an 80, opening doors for Hagen. On the final hole Hagen had a 10-foot putt to win. In an act of showmanship he solicited Brady from the clubhouse to show off and make him watch the winning putt. However, Hagen actually barely missed the putt. There would be an 18-hole playoff the next day. The playoff was another neck-and-neck struggle. The most significant hole was the par-3 17th. Hagen held a two-stroke lead. He hit his tee shot into a bank of mud but was allowed a free drop. Though Brady picked up a stroke on this hole some thought Hagen's score would be far worse if not for this "generous ruling." On the par-4 final hole, Hagen again hit a poor tee shot, nearly into a brook, but managed to recover well and made par. Brady had a chip shot from just off the green to tie but it barely missed. Hagen won by one, 77 to 78.

In the 1920s, there were many modifications to the course, partly to suit the growing membership. At the onset of the decade, membership had reached a record 800 members. Early in the 1920s, Brae Burn obtained more land from Henry B. Day, one of the founding members of the club, to create an additional nine hole course. In 1921, work on the course began. It was opened the following year, on September 22, 1922. It was known as the No. 2 course. In 1924, nine holes on the main course underwent an "improvement of a minor or on a large scale." In 1925, there were more modifications, "the most important being the from the 14th hole to the tee." Fourteen new fairway bunkers were installed on the hole. In addition, the fairway was narrowed by 20 yards. During the era, Irish-born "Old" John Shanahan was the greenskeeper. He was known as one of the best greenskeepers in the country. According to The Boston Globe, he was known for producing the best "putting surfaces" in the country.

In the mid-1920s, Brae Burn applied to host the 1926 U.S. Amateur. The USGA ultimately selected them for the 1928 U.S. Amateur. Architect Donald Ross performed another re-design in preparation of the event. According to The Pittsburgh Press, he "tightened up" the course. A journalist for The Springfield Daily Republican noted that "few would recognize" it from the 1919 U.S. Open days. The tournament is best remembered for the second round match between Bobby Jones and Ray Gorton. Jones was the top golfer in the world and the defending champion while Gorton was a local insurance executive and Brae Burn club member. Gorton shocked Jones and led for much of the match. On the 18th hole they were tied. It looked like Jones had won as his fourth shot landed about three feet from the cup and partially obscured Gorton's putt, his fifth shot. However, Gorton somehow "curled his putt around the partial stymie" to tie and force extra holes. On the extra hole, Gorton again nearly made an extraordinary putt to tie but his 30-footer barely missed. Jones won the match. Notable figures in the sports world were effusive in their praise of the performance. The following day Grantland Rice, the famed sportswriter, wrote it was "one of the most spectacular golf matches ever played." Referring to the back nine and extra hole, Walter Hagen stated: "That is the greatest 10 holes of match play golf I have ever seen." The near loss did not have any effect on Jones. He dominated the rest of the tournament, winning all of his remaining three matches easily, defeating defending British Amateur champion Philip Perkins in the finals, 10 & 9.

By the mid-20th century, Brae Burn was unable to host any more major championships or PGA Tour-level events as the length of the course was no longer challenging enough for modern players. However, the club continued to host minor tournaments. In 1946, the course hosted the New England Amateur. It was won by local star Ted Bishop who won the U.S. Amateur that year. In 1950, Brae Burn hosted the Massachusetts Amateur. The Boston Globe noted that Dick Chapman, former U.S. Amateur champ, was deemed to be a threat. Chapman did indeed win the event, defeating Edward Martin in extra holes. In addition, that year the club hosted the Massachusetts Women's Amateur again. It was won by Ann Boros, the wife of Julius Boros. In 1958, the course hosted the Curtis Cup, a ladies match play event between British amateurs and American amateurs. The Associated Press noted that it was "perhaps significant" that Brae Burn was hosting the tournament as the event's namesake was Margaret Curtis, champion of the 1906 U.S. Women's Amateur at Brae Burn. Curtis attended the event. The British, the defending champions, retained the cup at the 1958 Curtis Cup, tying 4.5−4.5 points.

The course has not had many alterations since Donald Ross' second re-design. In the mid-20th century, The Guardian commented that Brae Burn had not changed in decades. In 1978, The Boston Globe noted that the length of all of the individual holes "has been unchanged for more than half a century." In the late 20th century, club pro Mickey Lane confirmed that the club had not changed much. "The place still has the feel and the look that it did years ago, with a few minor changes," he said. One of the "minor changes" occurred in the 1960s. Noted local architect Geoffrey Cornish made some modifications, especially improving the 11th green. In addition, in 1990s the No. 2 course went under a series of renovations, especially the construction of cart paths. To correspond with club's Scottish influence, the No. 2 was renamed the Highlands Course. These changes have largely met with praise. For most of the late 20th century, the course was referenced as one of the top ten courses in the state by Golf Digest.

In 1997, Brae Burn celebrated its 100th anniversary. A book was published by members to commemorate the anniversary. It is entitled Brae Burn Country Club, 1897−1997 Centenary: 100 Years of Golf and Family Life. In addition, the USGA elected Brae Burn as the host for the U.S. Women's Amateur that year to honor the centenary. Italy's Silvia Cavalleri won defeating Robin Burke 5 & 4 in the finals. She became the first Italian to win the event.

In the early 21st century, however, there has been a controversy concerning "generous tax breaks" the club has allegedly received from the Commonwealth of Massachusetts. The Boston Globe reported that, in 2022, the club received $600,000 worth of tax exemptions from the state. The mayor of Newton, Ruthanne Fuller, was looking into the issue. She stated, "the level of abatement that state law currently allows deserves a second look." Brae Burn, however, has noted that its tax exempt status is legal under the Commonwealth's laws, specifically under Title IX, Chapter 61B, a chapter pertaining to the "Classification and Taxation of Recreational Land." The first section of this chapter refers to territories greater "than five acres in area shall be deemed to be recreational land" if the territory is maintained "in a landscaped or pasture condition." A number of recreational activities, including "golfing," meet these criteria. Brae Burn has noted that it has been "Tax-exempt since Aug. 1934." Brae Burn's tax exempt status is available to the public.

== Scorecard ==
Main Course
Tee	Rating/Slope	1	2	3	4	5	6	7	8	9	Out	10	11	12	13	14	15	16	17	18	In	Total
Par		4	4	4	4	5	3	4	3	4	35	5	4	3	5	5	4	4	3	4	37	72
SI	(Men)	13	7	9	3	1	17	5	15	11		8	4	18	6	2	14	12	16	10
Gold	M: 74.7/144	321	315	365	440	568	160	457	225	305	3,156	494	460	163	486	555	310	405	255	440	3,568	6,724
Blue	M: 71.2/136	318	289	345	424	546	149	400	164	289	2,924	480	418	151	467	535	295	351	226	352	3,275	6,199
White	M:64.9/112	406	279	318	362	477	133	377	159	250	2,760	456	406	117	460	439	285	340	216	333	3,094	5,854
Par		4	4	4	4	5	3	4	3	4	35	5	5	3	5	5	4	4	3	4	38	73
Red	W: 73.4/132	308	272	305	359	474	131	374	148	241	2,612	453	403	117	449	434	277	336	212	316	2,997	5,609
SI	(Women)	11	9	7	5	1	17	3	15	13		4	10	18	6	2	14	8	16	12

Highlands Course
Tee	Rating/Slope	1	2	3	4	5	6	7	8	9	Total
Par		4	3	5	3	4	3	4	4	3	33
SI	(Men)	3/4	15/16	9/10	13/14	1/2	17/18	5/6	7/8	11/12
Blue	64.2/114	360	147	418	163	405	155	342	298	152	2,440
Par		4	3	5	3	5	3	4	4	3	34
SI	(Women)	7/8	13/14	1/2	11/12	3/4	17/18	5/6	9/10	15/16
Red	66.2/117	352	135	406	148	392	123	330	288	139	2,313
