= 1928 U.S. Amateur =

Tournament information
- Dates: September 10–15, 1928
- Location: Newton, Massachusetts
- Course(s): Brae Burn Country Club
- Organized by: USGA
- Format: Match play − 5 rounds

Statistics
- Par: 72
- Length: 6,643 yards (6,074 m)
- Field: 32 players

Champion
- (United States) Bobby Jones
- def. (England) Philip Perkins, 10 and 9

The 1928 United States Amateur was the 32nd U.S. Amateur. It was hosted by Brae Burn Country Club in Newton, Massachusetts. Bobby Jones, the defending champion, was the favorite entering the event. However, a number of people had reservations about his chances. Jones did not play much golf in 1928, taken up by his work as a lawyer and golf writer, and he himself stated that Brae Burn did not align well with his game. These reservations seemed to be confirmed early in the event, as Jones struggled in the qualifier and barely won his second round match against Brae Burn club member, Ray Gorton. However, he cruised home in the 36-hole matches, ultimately defeating British Amateur champion Philip Perkins, 10 and 9, in the finals.

== Tournament summary ==
Defending champion Bobby Jones was the favorite entering the event. However, some had misgivings about his chances. As a teenager, Jones played the 1919 U.S. Open at Brae Burn and did not play well. While a student at Harvard University he continued to play at Brae Burn but still disliked it. One reporter claimed, "It was just not suited to his game at the time." It was noted by The Boston Globe, the day before the tournament began, that Jones still did not find the course amenable. "Brae Burn is not one of his favorite courses," the paper exclaimed. In addition, Jones at the time was largely focused on his work as a lawyer and golf writer. Due to these obligations, he had little competitive play during the year and some thought his game might be rusty.

The Brae Burn course had changed drastically since it held the 1919 U.S. Open. The famed golf course architect Donald Ross performed a second re-design of the course specifically for the U.S. Amateur. A journalist for the Springfield Daily Republican noted that "few would recognize" it from the 1919 tournament days. The Pittsburgh Press noted that Ross had "tightened up" the course and that it was subtly difficult. Walter R. McCallum of The Evening Star confirmed this, noting the myriad of "tricky second shots" and "deceptively placed water ditches." Another publication, The Republican, referred to Brae Burn as possessing "the most severe" course conditions "ever designed for a national amateur championship." The players generally agreed with the reporters that the course was hard. The 1914 champion Francis Ouimet wrote in The Boston Globe, "Length and accuracy are required, and the man who is the least bit inclined to stray from the fairways will find plenty of bother." However, he felt the greens would be "the chief difficulty." George Von Elm, champion of the 1926 U.S. Amateur, thought that Brae Burn was more challenging than the previous year's site at Minikahda Club in Minneapolis, Minnesota. According to The Brooklyn Daily Eagle, Jones, who won at Minikahda, also implied that Brae Burn was tougher.

The tournament began on September 10, 1928. It was the top story for that day's The Boston Globe. The entire field would play 18 qualifying holes that day and another 18 holes the following day. Bobby Jones "got off to a ragged start," taking five shots to make the green on the opening hole and recording a six. He ultimately "struggled" to a 77 and was outside the top ten. "I was just plain lousy," he said after the round. He told the media he was struggling with his swing. "I know what's the matter, but it seems impossible to fix it," he said. "I'm turning my right hand into the stroke too fast... It's disgusting." Brae Burn club member Ray Gorton was "well satisfied" with his round, also shooting a 76, putting him within the cut-off. In the second qualifying round, Jones "play[ed] it safe," shooting a 74 to easily qualify. George Voigt was the medalist, shooting rounds of 71 and 72. Gorton shot a second round 78 to qualify for the tournament proper. He was the only Brae Burn member to qualify.

The event proper was a single-elimination match play event. The first two rounds would be 18 holes. Some writers thought this was a conducive scenario for upsets. This limited amount of time might allow for "an unknown to catch fire" and defeat a star. The famed sportswriter Grantland Rice thought this was the best strategy to defeat Bobby Jones. The remaining rounds would be 36 holes each. Jones won his first round match again over J. Wolcott Brown, 4 and 3. Ray Gorton's match "was close all the way" but he defeated fellow Massachusetts golfer Carl Nettlebladt on the final hole. Jones and Gorton would play in the second round. The match between Jones and Gorton is generally regarded as one of the top matches in golf history. Jones opened poorly and Gorton was 2 up after 7 holes. Jones came back and won the next two holes; it was all square at the turn. On the par-5 10th hole, Gorton made the green in two and holed his 12-foot eagle putt. He had the lead again. The "fireworks" continued on the 11th hole. Jones sliced his drive into the rough and appeared to be "stymied" by a grove of trees but hit a "great recovery shot" to 15 feet. Gorton made his 20-foot birdie putt but Jones responded with his own birdie. On the par-3 12th, Gorton "had a short putt for a 2" but ended three-putting and lost the hole. They were now tied. Both remained tied entering the 18th hole. Jones hit a poor drive but Gorton's was even worse. Gorton took four shots to make the green. Jones made 5 but Gorton "curled" an 8-foot putt around a partial stymie to halve the hole. Legendary golfer Walter Hagen wrote after the match, "Gorton's 5 at this hole was the greatest 5 I have ever seen in golf." The Plain Dealer later referred to it as the "greatest shot of the 1928 season." On the extra hole, however, Gorton again hit a poor drive and it took him three shots to make the green. Jones made a routine 4. Gorton "almost tied him again when his 30-footer rimmed the cup" but it barely missed. Jones won. It was the only time he had the lead the entire match. Referring to back nine and the extra hole, Hagen also noted, "That is the greatest 10 holes of match play golf I have ever seen." The following day, Rice referred to it as "one of the most spectacular golf matches ever played." Several decades later, at the end of the century, the match was recalled in multiple articles by The Boston Globe.

Although he almost lost, Jones was still the overwhelming favorite. The remainder of the tournament matches would be 36 holes, a format he excelled in. Before the quarterfinals Grantland Rice wrote, "I think Jones is now almost a sure thing to reach the final round." Walter Hagen exclaimed, "I predict that Jones will breeze home a winner." Their predictions were accurate. Jones "had no opposition" for the remainder of the tournament. In the quarterfinals, he "annihilate[d]" England's John Beck, 14 and 13. This tied for the greatest margin of victory ever in the U.S. Amateur. He had now won 22 of his last 23 matches in the tournament going back several years. In the semifinals, against Harvard University student Phillips Finlay, Jones "had everything" again, winning 13 and 12. It was his "second spectacular score in two days." In the finals, Jones played English golfer Philip Perkins, defending champion of the British Amateur. Perkins won the first hole and the match was all square after four. However, Jones "started applying relentless pressure at the fifth," winning that hole and the following hole. He was 3 up at the turn. Jones then "uncorked four successive birdies" starting at the 10th to suddenly go 7 up. In the afternoon, Jones again dominated, winning four holes and losing none. He defeated Perkins 10 and 9. Perkins received a runner-up medal. In his speech, he referred to Jones as "the greatest golfer in the world − indeed the greatest golfer the world has ever known."
