= Bobby Jones Open =

The Bobby Jones Open is a golf tournament for people whose names are Robert Jones, Bob Jones, Bobby Jones, Robby Jones, or Rob Jones. It was founded by Robert A. Jones from Bloomfield Hills, Michigan. The tournament has raised over $300,000 for Syringomyelia research and support for Syringomyelia patients. It is named after Bobby Jones, considered the greatest amateur golfer ever. In 1930 at the age of 28, he won the U.S. and British Opens and the U.S. and British Amateur Championships. To date, no one has duplicated that record. He was stricken with Syringomyelia, a disorder of the spinal nerves which eventually led to his death in 1971.

== Winners ==
Year; Low Gross; Low Net, Golf Course; City/State

1979 No-Sag (Republic), Federal at Pine Lake Country Club - Orchard Lake, MI

1980 No-Sag (Republic), Federal at Tyrone Hills - Fenton, MI

1981 Tonn&Blank (Indiana), W. Virginia at Tyrone Hills - Fenton, MI

1982 Derby City Jr., Tyree at Tyrone Hills - Fenton, MI

1983 Tyree, Republic at Tyrone Hills - Fenton, MI

1984 Derby City Jr., New Jersey at U of M Golf Course - Ann Arbor, MI

1985 Derby City Jr., Indiana at U of M Golf Course - Ann Arbor, MI

1986 Tyree, Grey Wally at U of M Golf Course - Ann Arbor, MI

1987 Tyree, Derby City Jr. at U of M Golf Course - Ann Arbor, MI

1988 Derby City Jr., Kingsmill at U of M Golf Course - Ann Arbor, MI

1989 Derby City Jr., Iron Man at U of M Golf Course - Ann Arbor, MI

1990 Iron Man, Builder at Lincolnshire Resort - Chicago, IL

1991 Derby City Jr., Iron Man at Fox Hills - Plymouth, MI

1992 Kingsmill, Iron Man at Cordova Club - Memphis, TN

1993 Kingsmill, Iron Man at Eagle Crest - Ypsilanti, MI

1994 Kingsmill, R.D. at Bent Tree - Columbus, OH

1995 R.D., Builder at Eagle Crest - Ypsilanti, MI

1996 R.D., Derby City Jr. at Eagle Creek - Indianapolis, IN

1997 Iron Man, R.D. at Eagle Crest - Ypsilanti, MI

1998 Kingsmill, Derby City Jr. at Country Club of Illinois - Chicago, IL

1999 Holly, Derby City Jr. at Country Club of Hershey - Hershey, PA

2000 Derby City Jr., Pisgah at Tanglewood Golf Course - South Lyon, MI

2001 BaBa, Junior at White Water Country Club - Atlanta, GA

2002 Iron Man, Derby City Jr. at Marriott Griffen Gate - Lexington, KY

2003 Junior, Derby City Jr. at Shanty Creek - Bellaire, MI

2004 Derby City Jr., Holly at French Lick Springs Resort - French Lick, IN

2005 Holly, Junior at The Fortress - Frankenmuth, MI

2006 R.D., Holly at Talega Golf Club - San Clemente, CA

2007 Derby City Jr. Ironman at Brickyard Crossing - Indianapolis, IN

2008 Derby City Jr., R.D. at The Fortress - Frankenmuth, MI

2009 Derby City Jr., Stellar at Gaylord Springs Golf Links - Nashville, TN

2010 Holly, Stellar at Cleveland Country Club - Shelby, NC

2011 Stellar, Bugs at Boundary Oak Golf Club - Walnut Creek, CA

2012 Steeler, Stellar at Thousand Oak Golf Club, Grand Rapids, MI

2013 Red, Stellar & Holly at Inn at Pocono Manor East & West Course - Pocono Manor, PA

2014 Holly, Bodyshop at The Star Ranch - Round Rock, TX

2015 Bugs, Holly at Braelin Golf Club - Peach Tree City, GA

2016 Bodyshop, Bugs at The Hyperion Field Club - Des Moines, IA

2017 Derby City Jr., Bodyshop at Heritage Palms Golf Course - Indio, CA

2018 Derby City Jr.. Bugs at Treetops Resort - Gaylord MI

2019 Derby City Jr., Bodyshop at Evergreen Country Club - Haymarket, VA
