= Bert Hodson =

Welsh golfer (1905–1971)

Personal information
- Nationality: Wales
- Born: 1905 Rogerstone, Newport, Wales
- Died: 1971 (aged 66) Virginia, U.S.

Career
- Sport: Golf
- Status: Professional
- Professional wins: 4

Best results in major championships
- Masters Tournament: DNP
- PGA Championship: DNP
- U.S. Open: DNP
- The Open Championship: T7: 1927, 1934

Bert Hodson (1905–1971) was a Welsh professional golfer who played in the early 20th century. Hodson's best performances in major championships came in the 1927 and 1934 Open Championships when he was tied for seventh place in each event. Hodson played on the Great Britain Ryder Cup team in 1931.

== Early life ==
Hodson was born in Rogerstone, Newport, Wales in 1905. He started his career in golf as a caddie at Newport Golf Club and later became the head professional at Chigwell, Essex, England. While at Chigwell he was the mentor and teacher of Michael Bonallack. His younger brother Tim was the professional at Tredegar Park.

== Golf career ==
Hodson played in the 1926 Welsh Professional Championship at Harlech where he finished fifth. Bert Weastell won the championship by 12 strokes. In 1927 at Tenby he was a shot behind Ernest Kenyon at the end of the first day but won with a score of 290. He won the Welsh Professional Championship a second time in 1929.

=== 1927 Open Championship ===
The 1927 Open Championship was the 62nd Open Championship, held 13–15 July at the Old Course at St Andrews in St Andrews, Scotland. Amateur Bobby Jones successfully defended the title with a dominating six stroke victory, the second of his three victories at the Open Championship. Hodson finished T7 and carded rounds of 72-70-81-74=297 and won £10.

In September 1927 Hodson was one of twelve young professionals invited by Samuel Ryder to play in a tournament at Verulam, St Albans. He finished joint-winner with Jack Smith. Hodson was also involved in a "Seniors" v "Juniors" match organised by Ryder at Verulam in April 1928. He played for the juniors, losing his match against Harry Vardon 4 and 3.

Hodson moved from Newport Golf Club to Chigwell, Essex, starting his new position on 1 August 1929. Hodson remained at Chigwell until 1950 when he was replaced by Eddie Whitcombe.

=== 1934 Open Championship ===
Hodson finished T7 in the 1934 Open Championship held 27–29 June at Royal St George's Golf Club in Sandwich, England. The English linksman Henry Cotton dominated the championship, leading wire-to-wire on his way to a five stroke win and his first of three Open titles. Hodson fired rounds of 71-74-74-76=295 and won £17 10s.

=== Ryder Cup ===
Hodson was a member of the 1931 Great Britain Ryder Cup team.

== Tournament wins ==
Note: This list may be incomplete

- 1927 Welsh Professional Championship, Young Professionals' Tournament (joint winner with Jack Smith)
- 1929 Welsh Professional Championship
- 1932 Yorkshire Evening News Tournament

== Results in major championships ==
| Tournament | 1927 | 1928 | 1929 | 1930 | 1931 | 1932 | 1933 | 1934 | 1935 | 1936 | 1937 | 1938 | 1939 | 1940 | 1941 | 1942 | 1943 | 1944 | 1945 | 1946 | 1947 |
|---|---|---|---|---|---|---|---|---|---|---|---|---|---|---|---|---|---|---|---|---|---|
| U.S. Open | | | | | CUT | | | | | | | | | | | NT | NT | NT | NT | | |
| The Open Championship | T7 | T41 | CUT | 12 | T26 | T17 | CUT | T7 | T34 | T57 | CUT | | WD | NT | NT | NT | NT | NT | NT | | 38 |

Note: Hodson only played in the U.S. Open and The Open Championship.

Top 10
Did not play

NT = No tournament
WD = withdrew
CUT = missed the half-way cut
"T" indicates a tie for a place

== Team appearances ==
- Ryder Cup (representing Great Britain): 1931
- Seniors vs Juniors (representing the Juniors): 1928
- England–Ireland Professional Match (representing England): 1933 (winners)
- Triangular Professional Tournament (representing Wales): 1937
- Llandudno International Golf Trophy (representing Wales): 1938
