= 1927 Open Championship =

Coordinates: 56.3433°N 2.8028°W

Tournament information
- Dates: 13–15 July 1927
- Location: St Andrews, Scotland
- Course(s): Old Course at St Andrews

Statistics
- Par: 73
- Field: 108 players, 54 after cut
- Cut: 154 (+8)
- Prize fund: £250
- Winner's share: (£75)

Champion
- (United States) Bobby Jones (a)
- 285 (−7)

Location in Scotland
Location in Fife, Scotland

The 1927 Open Championship was the 62nd Open Championship, held 13–15 July at the Old Course in St Andrews, Scotland. Amateur Bobby Jones successfully defended the title with a dominating six-stroke victory, the second of his three victories at the Open Championship.

The regional qualification that had been used in 1926 was abandoned and the previous system of local qualifying just before the Open was reintroduced. Qualifying was held 11–12 July, Monday and Tuesday, with 18 holes on the Old Course and 18 holes on the New Course, and the top 100 and ties qualified. In heavy rain early that flooded the bunkers, Jones shot 76 on Monday at the Old Course, and 71 on Tuesday at the New Course for 147, three strokes behind the low qualifier. Amateur Cyril Tolley led the field with 144; the qualifying score was 160 and 108 players advanced.

Prize money was increased £50 to £250, although the winner's share remained at £75.

Jones, age 25, returned to St Andrews to make amends for his first experience on the course; six years earlier in 1921, he walked off the Old Course in frustration during the third round. He shot 68 (−5) in the first round on Wednesday, three clear of the rest of the field, and after a second round 72 was at 140 (−6), two shots ahead of Bert Hodson and four clear of Joe Kirkwood Sr. To make the cut, players had to be within fourteen strokes of the leader after 36 holes; it was at 154 (+8) and 54 advanced.

On Friday, Hodson ballooned to 81 (+8) in the third round and Jones closed with 73-72 for 285, a new championship record. Aubrey Boomer and Fred Robson tied for second place, six shots back.

Future three-time champion Henry Cotton, age 20, made his Open debut and finished in ninth place. Five-time champion J.H. Taylor made his last cut in the Open at the age of 56.

== Round summaries ==
=== First round ===
Wednesday, 13 July 1927

Place	Player	Score	To par
1	(United States) Bobby Jones (a)	68	−5
2	(Australia) Len Nettlefold (a)	71	−2
T3	(Scotland) Tom Dobson	72	−1
T3	(Wales) Bert Hodson	72	−1
T3	(Australia) Joe Kirkwood Sr.	72	−1
T3	(Republic of Ireland) Dan Murray	72	−1
T3	(England) Eustace Storey (a)	72	−1
T3	(Scotland) William Torrance (a)	72	−1
T9	(England) Henry Cotton	73	E
T9	(England) Don Curtis	73	E
T9	(England) Tom King Jr.	73	E
T9	(England) Mark Seymour	73	E

=== Second round ===
Thursday, 14 July 1927

Place	Player	Score	To par
1	(United States) Bobby Jones (a)	68-72=140	−6
2	(Wales) Bert Hodson	72-70=142	−4
3	(Australia) Joe Kirkwood Sr.	72-72=144	−2
4	(England) Henry Cotton	73-72=145	−1
T5	(Jersey) Aubrey Boomer	76-70=146	E
T5	(England) George Buckle	77-69=146	E
T7	(England) Percy Alliss	73-74=147	+1
T7	(Scotland) Tom Dobson	72-75=147	+1
T7	(England) Tom King Jr.	73-74=147	+1
T7	(England) Ernest Whitcombe	74-73=147	+1

=== Third round ===
Friday, 15 July 1927 (morning)

Place	Player	Score	To par
1	(United States) Bobby Jones (a)	68-72-73=213	−6
2	(England) Fred Robson	76-72-69=217	−2
T3	(Jersey) Aubrey Boomer	76-70-73=219	E
T3	(Australia) Joe Kirkwood Sr.	72-72-75=219	E
T5	(England) Percy Alliss	73-74-73=220	+1
T5	(England) Ernest Whitcombe	74-73-73=220	+1
T7	(England) Len Holland	75-75-71=221	+2
T7	(England) Charles Whitcombe	74-76-71=221	+2
9	(England) Henry Cotton	73-72-77=222	+3
T10	(England) George Buckle	77-69-77=223	+4
T10	(Wales) Bert Hodson	72-70-81=223	+4
T10	(England) Philip Rodgers	76-73-74=223	+4
T10	(United States) Tom Stevens	76-73-74=223	+4

=== Final round ===
Friday, 15 July 1927 (afternoon)

Place	Player	Score	To par	Money (£)
1	(United States) Bobby Jones (a)	68-72-73-72=285	−7	0
T2	(Jersey) Aubrey Boomer	76-70-73-72=291	−1	62; 10s
T2	(England) Fred Robson	76-72-69-74=291	−1	62; 10s
T4	(Australia) Joe Kirkwood Sr.	72-72-75-74=293	+1	20
T4	(England) Ernest Whitcombe	74-73-73-73=293	+1	20
6	(England) Charles Whitcombe	74-76-71-75=296	+4	15
T7	(England) Arthur Havers	80-74-73-70=297	+5	10
T7	(Wales) Bert Hodson	72-70-81-74=297	+5	10
9	(England) Henry Cotton	73-72-77-76=298	+6	10
T10	(England) Percy Alliss	73-74-73-80=300	+8	8
T10	(Scotland) Sandy Herd	76-75-78-71=300	+8	8
T10	(England) Philip Perkins (a)	76-78-70-76=300	+8	0
T10	(England) Philip Rodgers	76-73-74-77=300	+8	8
T10	(Scotland) William Torrance (a)	72-80-74-74=300	+8	0
T10	(England) Roland Vickers	75-75-77-73=300	+8	8
T10	(England) Tom Williamson	75-76-78-71=300	+8	8

Amateurs: Jones (−7), Perkins (+8), Torrance (+8), Tweddell (+14),
Harris (+15), Tolley (+15), de Montmorency (+17), Nettlefold (+26).
