= Philip Rodgers =

English golfer (1891–1966)

Personal information
- Full name: Philip Hugh Rodgers
- Nationality: England
- Born: 1891 Sandycroft, Hawarden, Flintshire, Wales
- Died: 1 August 1966 (aged 74) Blackpool, Lancashire, England

Career
- Sport: Golf
- Status: Professional
- Professional wins: 1

Best results in major championships
- Masters Tournament: DNP
- PGA Championship: DNP
- U.S. Open: DNP
- The Open Championship: T10: 1927

Philip Hugh Rodgers (1891 – 1 August 1966) was an English professional golfer who played in the early 20th century. Rodgers' best performance came in the 1927 Open Championship when he tied for tenth place.

== Early life ==
Rodgers was born in Sandycroft, Hawarden, Flintshire, Wales in 1891, the son of Walter Ernest Rodgers.

== Golf career ==
=== 1927 Open Championship ===
The 1927 Open Championship was the 62nd Open Championship, held 13–15 July at the Old Course at St Andrews in St Andrews, Scotland. Amateur Bobby Jones successfully defended the title with a dominating six stroke victory, the second of his three victories at the Open Championship. Rodgers had rounds of 76-73-74-77=300 and tied for tenth place with three other players. He won £8 in prize money.

=== 1929 News of the World Matchplay ===
Rodgers was runner-up to Abe Mitchell in the 1929 News of the World Matchplay at Wentworth, losing 8 & 7 in the final. In 1932 he won the Northern Professional Championship, scoring 298 and winning by a stroke from D. C. Jones.

== Death ==
Rodgers died in Blackpool, Lancashire, on 1 August 1966 aged 74.

== Tournament wins ==
- 1932 Northern Professional Championship

== Results in major championships ==
Tournament	1924	1925	1926	1927	1928	1929	1930	1931	1932	1933	1934	1935	1936
The Open Championship	T65			T10			T15	T29	T25	CUT	CUT	T18	CUT

Note: Rodgers only played in The Open Championship.

Top 10
Did not play

CUT = missed the half-way cut
"T" indicates a tie for a place
