= Philip Perkins =

English professional golfer

Personal information
- Full name: Thomas Philip Perkins
- Nationality: England
- Born: 3 September 1904 West Bromwich, Staffordshire, England
- Died: 26 December 1978 (aged 74) Broward County, Florida, U.S.
- Spouse: Cecil Lupton (m. 1932)

Career
- Sport: Golf
- Turned professional: 1932
- Professional wins: 1

Best results in major championships (wins: 1)
- Masters Tournament: T28: 1935
- PGA Championship: DNP
- U.S. Open: T2: 1932
- The Open Championship: T10: 1927
- U.S. Amateur: 2nd: 1928
- British Amateur: Won: 1928

Thomas Philip Perkins (3 September 1904 – 26 December 1978) was an English professional golfer best known for winning the 1928 Amateur Championship (British Amateur).

== Amateur career ==
In May 1928, Perkins won the Amateur Championship, 6 & 4, over Roger Wethered. In August, he came to the United States with the 1928 Walker Cup team. The Great Britain team lost to the U.S. team, 11–1. Perkins played Bobby Jones in a singles match, losing 13 & 12. In September 1928, Perkins and Jones met again in the final of the U.S. Amateur at Brae Burn Country Club. It was the first time that the reigning U.S. Amateur champion (Jones) and Amateur Championship champion (Perkins) met in the final. Jones won the match, 10 & 9.

== Professional career ==
Perkins stayed in the U.S., living in New York, and turned professional in June 1932, four months after being wounded in a shooting in Florida. Later in June, he finish tied for second in the U.S. Open, after having been the co-leader at the half-way point.

== Amateur wins ==
this list may be incomplete

- 1927 English Amateur
- 1928 The Amateur Championship
- 1931 Long Island Amateur, New York State Amateur

== Professional wins ==
- 1937 Ohio Open

== Major championships ==
=== Wins (1) ===
Year	Championship	Winning score	Runner-up
1928	British Amateur	6 & 4	(England) Roger Wethered

=== Results timeline ===
Tournament	1927	1928	1929	1930	1931	1932	1933	1934	1935	1936	1937	1938	1939	1940
Masters Tournament	NYF	NYF	NYF	NYF	NYF	NYF	NYF	33	T28					
U.S. Open				T43	T7 LA	T2	T33	T21	T36		CUT			CUT
The Open Championship	T10	T14 LA	T23 LA											NT
U.S. Amateur		2		R32	DNQ	–	–	–	–	–	–	–	–	–
The Amateur Championship	R128	1	R32			–	–	–	–	–	–	–	–	–

Note: Perkins never played in the PGA Championship.

Win
Top 10
Did not play

LA = Low Amateur
NYF = Tournament not yet founded
NT = No tournament
DNQ = Did not qualify for match play portion
R128, R64, R32, R16, QF, SF = Round in which player lost in match play
"T" indicates a tie for a place

Sources: Masters, U.S. Open and U.S. Amateur, Open Championship, Amateur Championship

== Team appearances ==
Amateur

- Walker Cup (representing Great Britain & Ireland): 1928
- England–Scotland Amateur Match (representing England): 1927 (tie), 1928 (winners), 1929 (tie)
