= Bobby Jones (golfer) =

American amateur golfer (1902–1971)

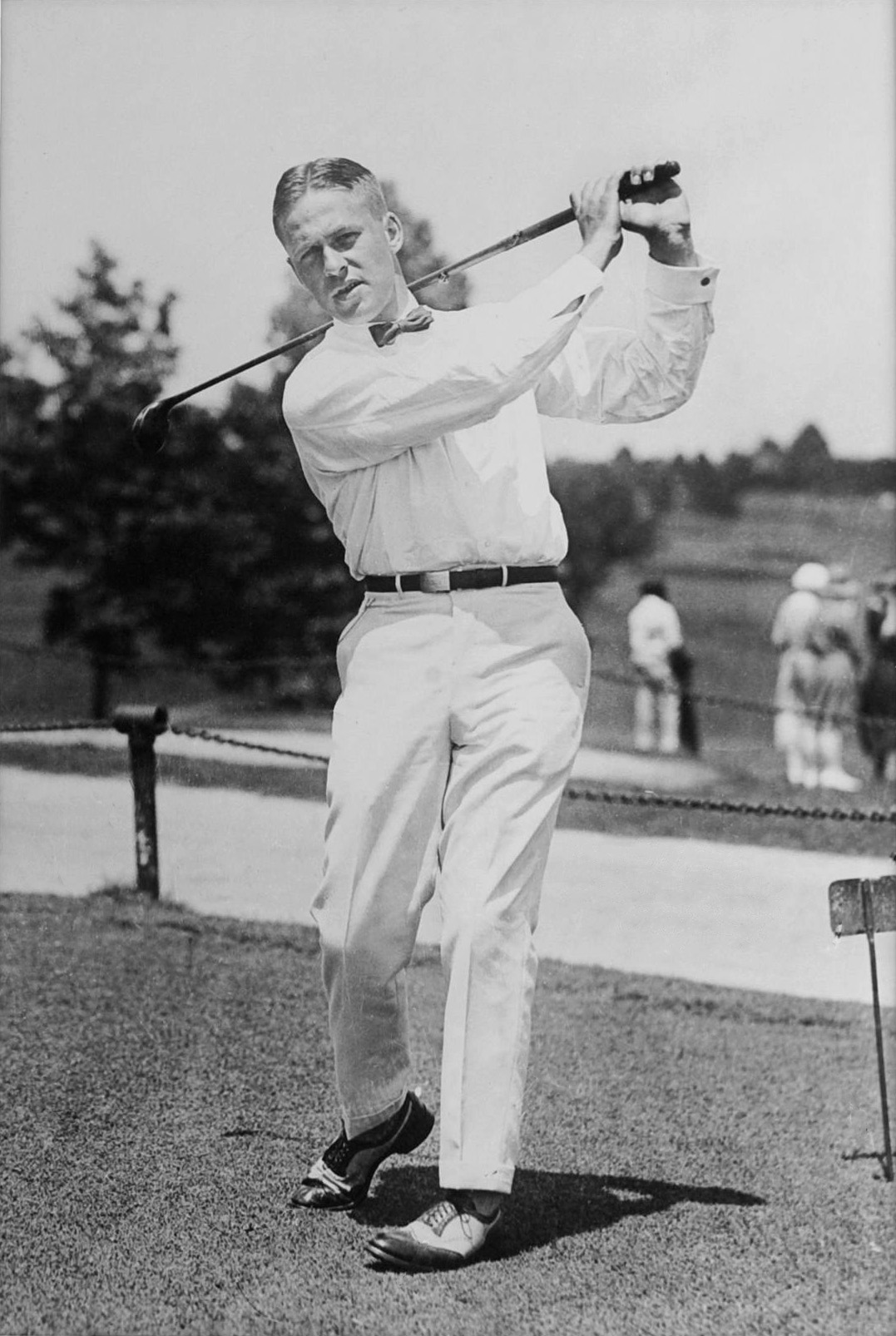
- Jones, c. 1921

Personal information
- Full name: Robert Tyre Jones Jr.
- Nationality: United States
- Born: March 17, 1902 Atlanta, Georgia, U.S.
- Died: December 18, 1971 (aged 69) Atlanta, Georgia, U.S.
- Height: 5 ft 8 in (173 cm)
- Weight: 165 lb (75 kg; 11.8 st)
- Spouse: Mary Rice Malone (m. 1924)
- Children: 3

Career
- Sport: Golf
- College: Georgia Tech (BS); Harvard University (BA); Emory University (No degree)
- Turned professional: 1930
- Professional wins: 9

Number of wins by tour
- PGA Tour: 9

Best results in major championships (wins: 13)
- Masters Tournament: T13: 1934
- PGA Championship: DNP
- U.S. Open: Won: 1923, 1926, 1929, 1930
- The Open Championship: Won: 1926, 1927, 1930
- U.S. Amateur: Won: 1924, 1925, 1927, 1928, 1930
- British Amateur: Won: 1930

Achievements and awards
- World Golf Hall of Fame: 1974 (member page)
- James E. Sullivan Award: 1930
- Georgia Tech Athletic Hall of Fame: 1958
- Georgia Tech Engineering Hall of Fame: 1997

Robert Tyre Jones Jr. (March 17, 1902 – December 18, 1971) was an American amateur golfer who was one of the most influential figures in the history of the sport; he was also a lawyer by profession. Jones founded and helped design Augusta National Golf Club, and co-founded the Masters Tournament. The innovations that he introduced at the Masters have been copied by virtually every professional golf tournament in the world.

Jones was the most successful amateur golfer ever to compete at a national and international level. During his peak from 1923 to 1930, he dominated top-level amateur competition, and competed very successfully against the world's best professional golfers. Jones often beat stars such as Walter Hagen and Gene Sarazen, the era's top pros. Jones earned his living mainly as a lawyer, and competed in golf only as an amateur, primarily on a part-time basis, and chose to retire from competition at age 28, though he earned significant money from golf after that, as an instructor and equipment designer.

Explaining his decision to retire, Jones said, "It [championship golf] is something like a cage. First you are expected to get into it and then you are expected to stay there. But of course, nobody can stay there." Jones is most famous for his unique "Grand Slam," consisting of his victory in all four major golf tournaments of his era (the open and amateur championships in both the U.S. and the U.K.) in a single calendar year (1930). In all Jones played in 31 majors, winning 13 and placing among the top ten finishers 27 times.

After retiring from competitive golf in 1930, Jones founded and helped design the Augusta National Golf Club soon afterwards in 1933. He also co-founded the Masters Tournament, which has been annually staged by the club since 1934 (except for 1943–45, when it was canceled due to World War II). The Masters evolved into one of golf's four major championships. Jones came out of retirement in 1934 to play in the Masters on an exhibition basis through 1948. Jones played his last round of golf at East Lake Golf Club, his home course in Atlanta, on August 18, 1948. A picture commemorating the event now sits in the clubhouse at East Lake. Citing health reasons, he quit golf permanently thereafter. Jones suffered from a rare neurological condition called syringomyelia, which eventually robbed him of the ability to walk. He died of cardiovascular disease in 1971.

Bobby Jones was often confused with the prolific golf course designer Robert Trent Jones, with whom he worked from time to time. "People always used to get them confused, so when they met, they decided each be called something different," Robert Trent Jones Jr. said. To help avoid confusion, the golfer was called "Bobby," and the golf course designer was called "Trent."

== Early life ==
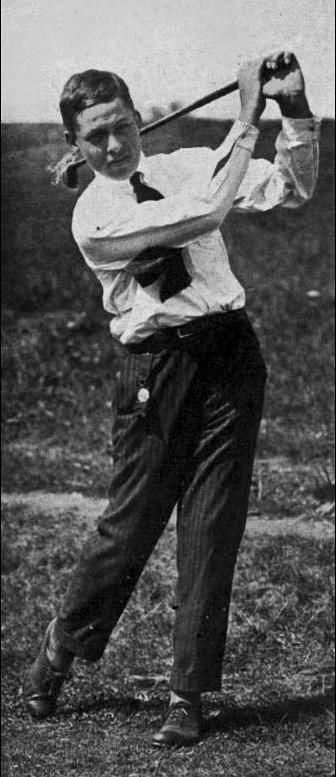
Jones, age 14

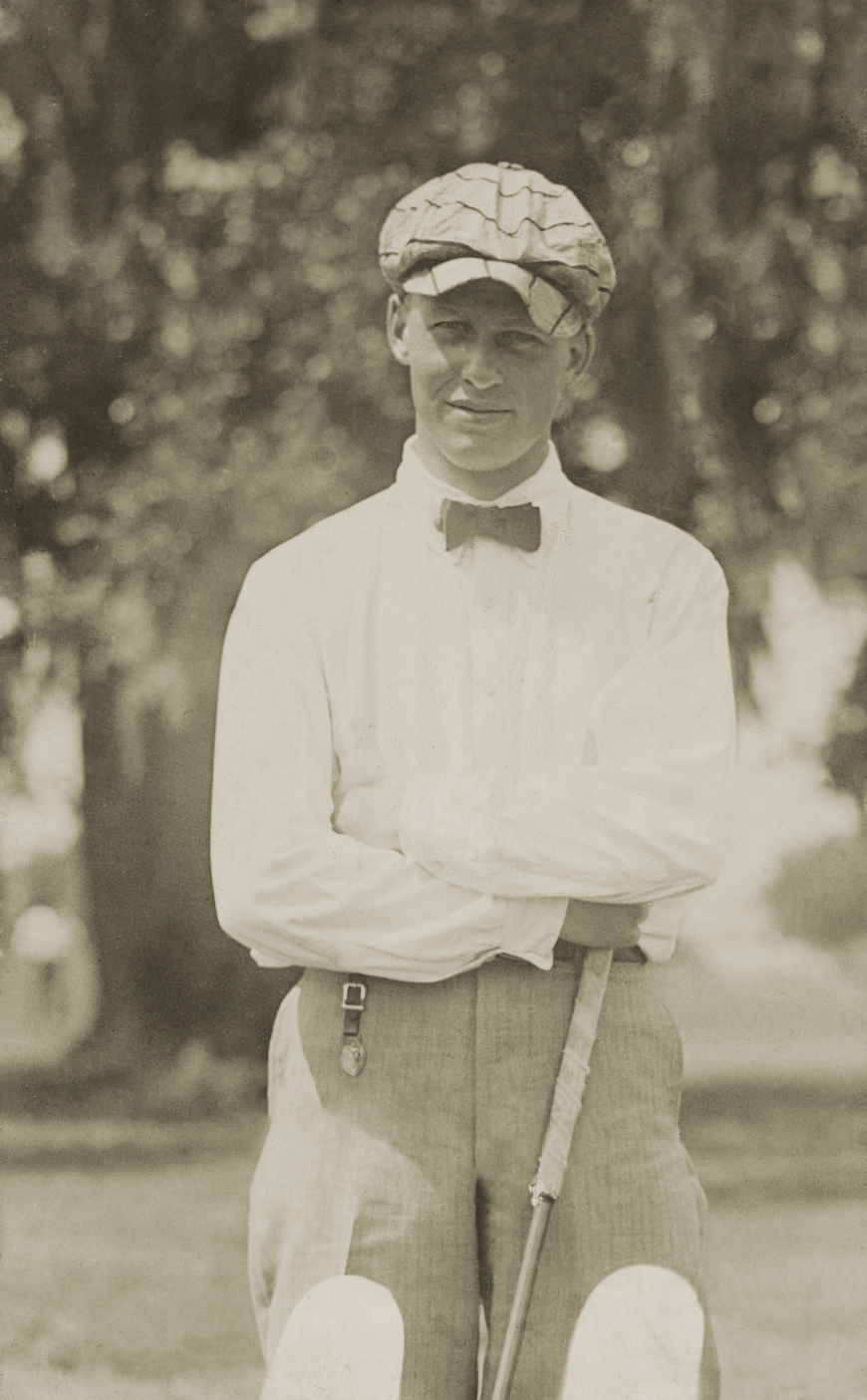
Jones at the Southern Open in New Orleans, 1919

Jones was born on March 17, 1902, in Atlanta, Georgia. He battled health issues as a young boy, and golf was prescribed to strengthen him. Encouraged by his father, "Colonel" Robert Purmedus Jones, an Atlanta lawyer, Jones loved golf from the start. He developed quickly into a child prodigy who won his first children's tournament at the age of six at his home course at East Lake Golf Club. In 1916, Jones won his first major golf event when he claimed the inaugural Georgia Amateur Championship conducted by the Georgia State Golf Association at the Capital City Club, in Brookhaven, at age 14. His victory at this event put him in the national spotlight for the first time. The Georgia Amateur win caught the eye of the United States Golf Association which awarded Jones his first invitation to the U.S. Amateur at Merion near Philadelphia. Jones advanced to the quarterfinals in his first playing in the event.

He was influenced by club professional Stewart Maiden, a native of Carnoustie, Scotland. Maiden was the professional at the Atlanta Athletic Club's East Lake Golf Club, who also trained Alexa Stirling, the three-time winner of the U.S. Women's Amateur, who was five years older than Jones but also a prodigy at East Lake. Jones also received golf lessons from Willie Ogg when he was in his teenage years. Jones played frequently with his father, a skilled golfer himself. The younger Jones sometimes battled his own temper on the course, but later controlled his emotions as he became more experienced. Jones toured the U.S. during World War I from 1917 to 1918, playing exhibition matches before large crowds, often with Alexa Stirling and Perry Adair, to generate income for war relief. Playing in front of such crowds in these matches helped him, as he moved into national competition a bit later on.

Jones successfully represented the United States for the first time, in two winning international amateur team matches against Canada, in 1919 and 1920, earning three of a possible four points in foursomes and singles play. In 1919 he traveled to Hamilton Golf and Country Club, for his first serious competitive action outside the U.S., while in 1920, Engineers Country Club, in Roslyn, Long Island, hosted the matches. Still a teenager, he was by far the youngest player in the series. Jones also played in the 1919 Canadian Open while in Hamilton, Ontario, performing very well to place tied for second, but 16 shots behind winner J. Douglas Edgar. Edgar had immigrated from England in 1919 to take a club professional's job in Atlanta at Druid Hills Golf Club; Edgar mentored and played frequently with Jones from 1919 to 1921. Edgar was credited by Jones with helping develop his game significantly.

Jones qualified for his first U.S. Open at age 18 in 1920, and was paired with the legendary Harry Vardon for the first two rounds. He won the Southern Amateur three times: 1917, 1920, and 1922. Jones earned his B.S. in Mechanical Engineering from Georgia Tech in 1922 and played for the varsity golf team, lettering all four years. Jones was a member of the Sigma Alpha Epsilon fraternity, and the Georgia Phi chapter house at Georgia Tech is named in his honor. He then earned an A.B. in English Literature from Harvard College in 1924, where he was a member of the Owl Club. In 1926 he entered Emory University School of Law and became a member of Phi Delta Phi. After only three semesters he passed the Georgia bar exam and subsequently joined his father's law firm, Jones, Evins, Moore and Howell, (predecessor to Alston & Bird), in Atlanta, Georgia.

== Golf ==
=== First majors ===
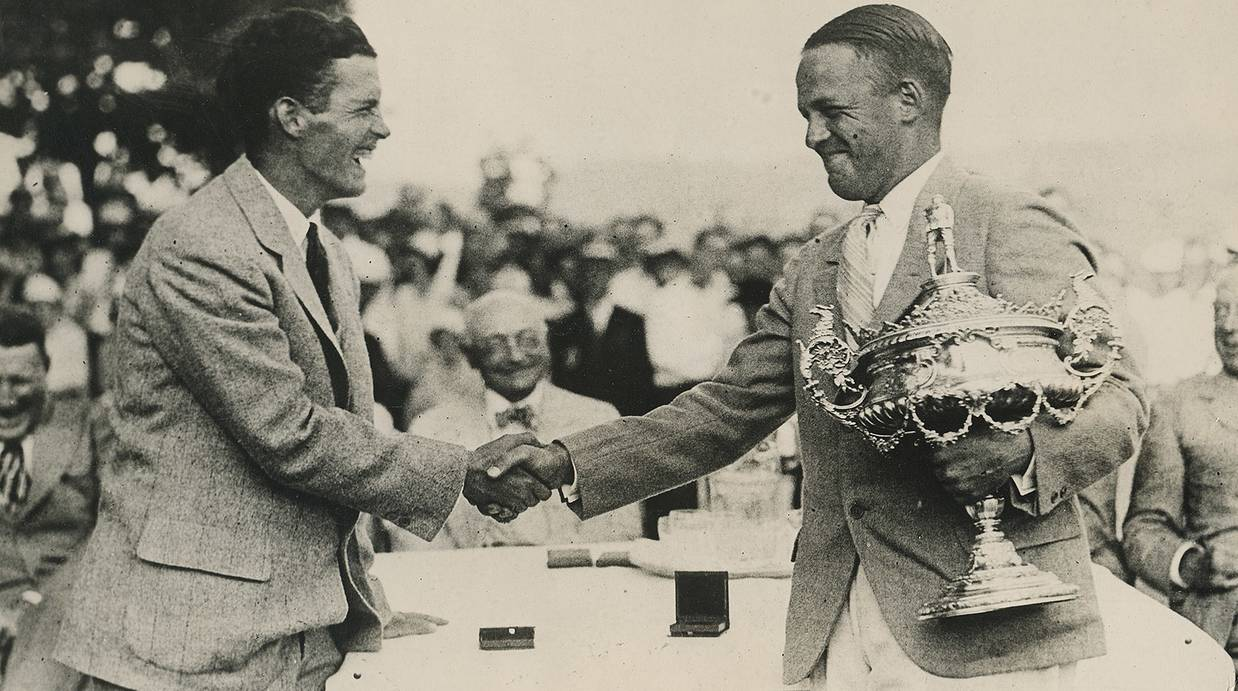
Jones holding trophy at 1925 U.S. Amateur final

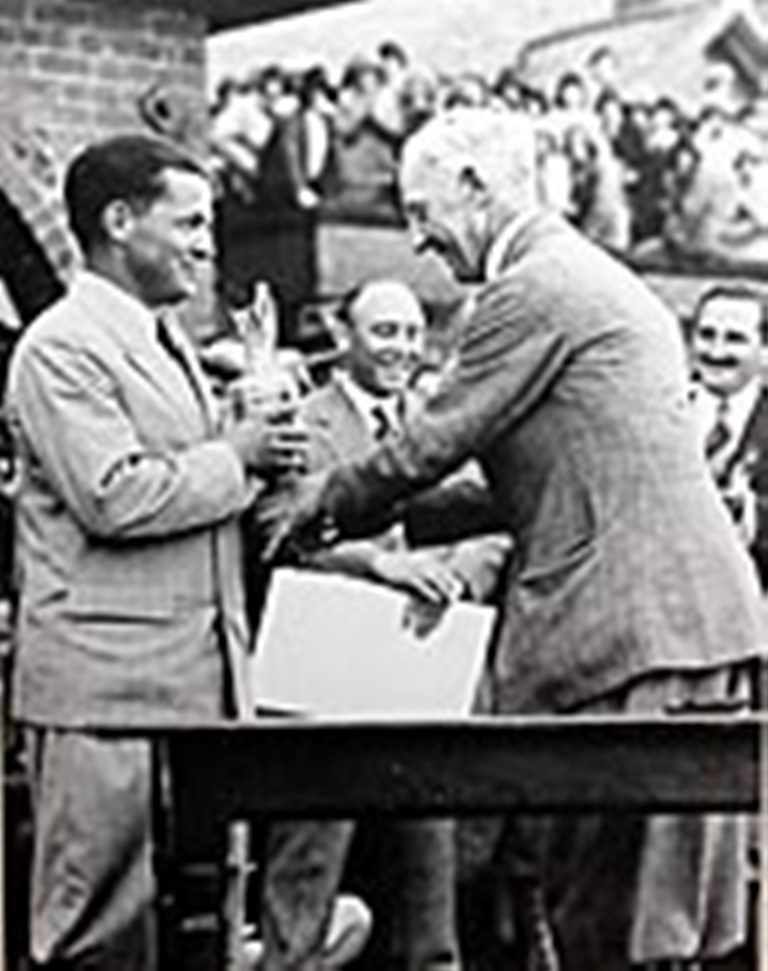
The Open Championship win 1930

As an adult, he hit his stride and won his first U.S. Open in 1923. From that win at New York's Inwood Country Club, through his 1930 victory in the U.S. Amateur, he won 13 major championships (as they were counted at the time) in 21 attempts. Jones was the first player to win "The Double", both the Open Championship and the U.S. Open Championships in the same year (1926). He was the second (and last) to win the U.S. Open and U.S. Amateur in the same year (1930), first accomplished in 1916 by Chick Evans. Jones also won both the British Amateur and the Open Championships in 1930, and is the second golfer in history after John Ball to win those two tournaments in the same year.

=== 1930: Grand Slam ===
Jones is the only player ever to have won the (pre-Masters) Grand Slam, or all four major championships, in the same calendar year (1930). Jones's path to the 1930 Grand Slam title was:

1. The Amateur Championship, Old Course at St Andrews, Scotland (May 31, 1930)
2. The Open Championship, Royal Liverpool Golf Club, Hoylake, England (June 20, 1930)
3. U.S. Open, Interlachen Country Club, Minnesota (July 12, 1930)
4. U.S. Amateur, Merion Golf Club, Pennsylvania (September 27, 1930)

Jones made a bet on himself achieving this feat with British bookmakers early in 1930, before the first tournament of the Slam, at odds of 50–1, and collected over $60,000 when he did it.

=== Walker Cup ===
Jones represented the United States in the Walker Cup five times, winning nine of his 10 matches, and the U.S. won the trophy all five times. He served as playing captain of the U.S. team in 1928 and 1930. He also won two other tournaments against professionals: the 1927 Southern Open and the 1930 Southeastern Open. Jones was a lifelong member of the Atlanta Athletic Club (at the club's original site, now East Lake Golf Club), and the Capital City Club in Atlanta.

=== Sportsmanship ===
In the first round of the 1925 U.S. Open at the Worcester Country Club near Boston, his approach shot to the 11th hole's elevated green fell short into the deep rough of the embankment. As he took his stance to pitch onto the green, the head of his club brushed the grass and caused a slight movement of the ball. He took the shot, then informed his playing partner Walter Hagen and the USGA official covering their match that he was calling a penalty on himself. Hagen was unable to talk him out of it, and they continued play. After the round and before he signed his scorecard, officials argued with Jones but he insisted that he had violated Rule 18, moving a ball at rest after address, and took a 77 instead of the 76 he otherwise would have carded. Jones's self-imposed one-stroke penalty eventually cost him the win by a stroke in regulation, necessitating a playoff, which he then lost. Although praised by many sports writers for his gesture, Jones was reported to have said, "You might as well praise me for not robbing banks."

A similar event occurred in the next U.S. Open, played at the Scioto Country Club in Columbus, Ohio. In the second round, after his opening round put him in second place, Jones was putting on the 15th green in the face of a strong wind. After grounding his putter during address to square up the club face, the ball rolled a half turn in the wind when Jones lifted the club head to place it behind the ball. Although no one else observed this movement of the ball either, again Jones called a penalty on himself, but this time Jones went on to win the tournament, the second of his four U.S. Open victories.

=== St Andrews, Scotland ===
Jones had a unique relationship with the town of St Andrews. On his first appearance on the Old Course in The Open Championship of 1921, he withdrew after 11 holes in the third round, when he failed to complete the hole (in effect disqualifying himself), and tore up his scorecard, although he finished the round and indeed played the fourth round as well. He firmly stated his dislike for The Old Course and the town reciprocated, saying in the press, "Master Bobby is just a boy, and an ordinary boy at that."

Later, he came to love the Old Course and the town like few others. When he won the Open at the Old Course in 1927, he wowed the crowd by asking that the trophy remain with his friends at the Royal and Ancient Golf Club rather than return with him to Atlanta. He won the British Amateur over The Old Course in 1930, and scored a double eagle 2 on the fourth hole (then a par-5, now a par-4), by holing a very long shot from a fairway bunker.

In 1958, he was named a Freeman of the City of St Andrews, becoming only the second American to be so honored, the other being Benjamin Franklin in 1759. As Jones departed Younger Hall with his honor, the assembly spontaneously serenaded him off to the traditional tune of "Will Ye No Come Back Again?" in a famously moving tribute.

Today, a scholarship exchange bearing the Jones name exists between the University of St Andrews and Emory University, Queen's University, The University of Western Ontario and the Georgia Institute of Technology in Atlanta. At Emory, four students are sent to St Andrews for an all-expenses-paid year of study and travel. In return, Emory accepts four students from St Andrews each year. The program, the Robert T. Jones Scholarship, is among the most unusual scholarships offered by any university.

=== Turned professional ===
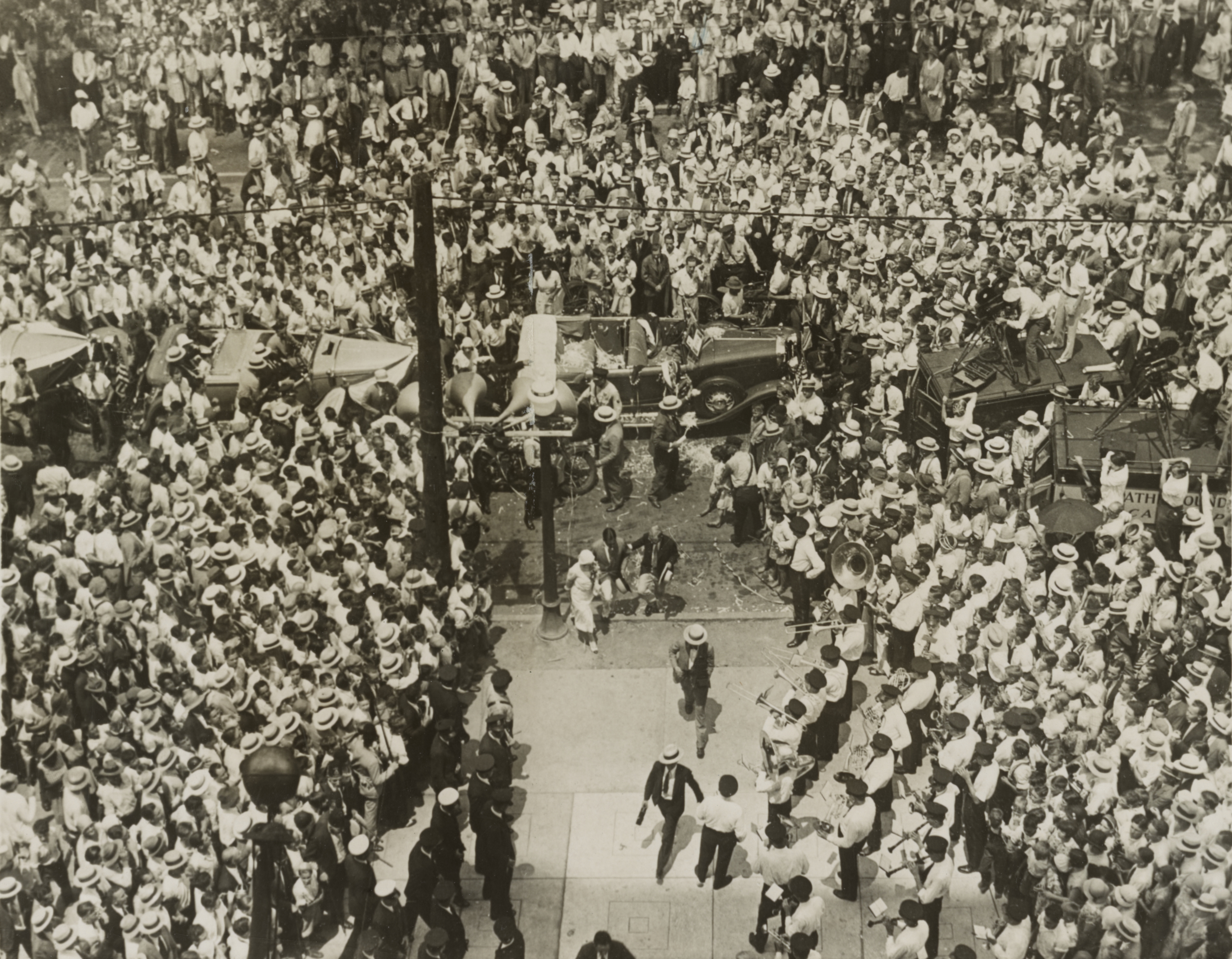
Crowds and band greeting Jones at Atlanta City Hall in July 1930

In September 1930, a month and a half after his final U.S. Amateur victory, Jones turned professional. Though he did not intend to earn money from playing golf in pro tournaments, Jones intended to make money from instructional films and books. According to USGA rules, only professionals were allowed to make money from golf in any form. In addition, Jones worked with J Victor East, an Australian of A.G. Spalding & Co., to develop the first set of matched steel-shafted clubs; the clubs sold very well and into the 1970s were still considered among the best-designed sets ever made.

=== Masters Tournament ===
Jones played in the first dozen Masters, through 1948, but only in the first as a contender. By then, his health at age 46 had declined to the stage where this was no longer possible. With his health difficulties, being past his prime, and not competing elsewhere to stay in tournament form, he never truly contended at the Masters, although his scores were usually respectable. These were almost all ceremonial performances, since his main duty was as host of the event. His extraordinary popularity, efforts with the course design, and tournament organization boosted the profile of the Masters significantly. The tournament, jointly run by Jones and Clifford Roberts, made many important innovations that became the norm elsewhere, such as gallery ropes to control the flow of the large crowds, many scoreboards around the course, the use of red / green numbers on those scoreboards to denote under / over par scores, an international field of top players, high-caliber television coverage, and week-long admission passes for patrons, which became extremely hard to obtain. The tournament also sought and welcomed feedback from players, fans, and writers, leading to continual improvement over the years. The Masters gradually evolved to being one of the most respected tournaments in the world, one of the four major championships.

== Augusta National Golf Club ==
Following his retirement from competitive golf in 1930, and even in the years leading up to that, Jones had become one of the most famous sports figures in the world and was recognized virtually everywhere he went. While certainly appreciative of the enormous adulation and media coverage, this massive attention caused Jones to lose his privacy in golf circles, and he wished to create a private golf club where he and his friends could play golf in peace and quiet. For several years, he searched for a property near Atlanta where he could develop his own golf club. His friend Clifford Roberts, a New York City investment dealer, knowing of Jones's desire, became aware of a promising property for sale in Augusta, Georgia, where Jones's mother-in-law had grown up, and informed Jones about it. Jones first visited Fruitlands, an Augusta arboretum and indigo plantation since the Civil War era, in the spring of 1930, and he purchased it for $70,000 in 1931, with the plan to design a golf course on the site.

Alister MacKenzie followed Jones at the 1927 Open Championship and presented him with an inscribed copy of his book Golf Architecture after his victory at the Old Course in St. Andrews. Two years later, Jones was in California for the 1929 U.S. Amateur at Pebble Beach, which provided an opportunity to experience two courses designed by MacKenzie. Jones played in an exhibition at Pasatiempo and practice round at Cypress Point Club. It is said that Jones was so impressed by Cypress Point that he asked MacKenzie about his interest in the Augusta project, which was originally envisioned as a "golfing hotel resort" before he won the Grand Slam. Jones co-designed the Augusta National course with MacKenzie. The new club opened in early 1933 with the purpose of hosting golf tournaments. Jones had hoped the U.S. Open could be played at Augusta, but the course conditions were not suitable in the summer when the Open was played. Grantland Rice, editor of American Golfer, made the suggestion to hold a tournament for sports writers who were returning home after attending spring training in Florida. The tournament was held in March 1934. The new tournament, originally known as the Augusta National Invitational, was an immediate success and attracted most of the world's top players right from its start. Jones came out of retirement to play, essentially on an exhibition basis, and his presence guaranteed enormous media attention, boosting the new tournament's fame. In 1939, the tournament was renamed The Masters. The Masters, one of the best-known golf tournaments, is part of the modern Grand Slam.

Later, in 1947, he founded Peachtree Golf Club in Atlanta and co-designed the course with Robert Trent Jones.

== Amateur wins ==
- 1915 Invitation Tournament at Roebuck Springs
- 1916 Georgia Amateur, Birmingham Country Club Invitation, Cherokee Club Invitation, East Lake Invitational
- 1917 Southern Amateur
- 1919 Yates-Gode Tournament
- 1920 Southern Amateur, Morris County Invitational, Birmingham Country Club Invitation
- 1922 Southern Amateur
- 1924 **U.S. Amateur**
- 1925 **U.S. Amateur**
- 1927 **U.S. Amateur**
- 1928 Warren K. Wood Memorial, **U.S. Amateur**
- 1930 Golf Illustrated Gold Vase, **The Amateur Championship**, **U.S. Amateur**

Amateur majors shown in bold.

== Professional wins (9) ==
=== PGA Tour wins (9) ===
- 1923 **U.S. Open**
- 1926 **The Open Championship**, **U.S. Open**
- 1927 Southern Open, **The Open Championship**
- 1929 **U.S. Open**
- 1930 Southeastern Open, **The Open Championship**, **U.S. Open**

Professional majors shown in bold.

Note: all as an amateur

== Major championships ==
=== Wins (13) ===
==== The Opens (7) ====
Year	Championship	54 holes	Winning score	Margin	Runner(s)-up
1923	U.S. Open	3 shot lead	+8 (71–73–76–76=296)	Playoff ^{1}	(Scotland) Bobby Cruickshank
1926	The Open Championship	2 shot deficit	(72–72–73–74=291)	2 strokes	(United States) Al Watrous
1926	U.S. Open	3 shot deficit	+5 (70–79–71–73=293)	1 stroke	(United States) Joe Turnesa
1927	The Open Championship	4 shot lead	−7 (68–72–73–72=285)	6 strokes	(Jersey) Aubrey Boomer, (England) Fred Robson
1929	U.S. Open	3 shot lead	+6 (69–75–71–79=294)	Playoff ^{2}	(United States) Al Espinosa
1930	The Open Championship	1 shot deficit	+3 (70–72–74–75=291)	2 strokes	(United States) Leo Diegel, (Scotland) Macdonald Smith
1930	U.S. Open	5 shot lead	−1 (71–73–68–75=287)	2 strokes	(Scotland) Macdonald Smith

^{1} Defeated Bobby Cruickshank in an 18-hole playoff: Jones 76 (+4), Cruickshank 78 (+6).
^{2} Defeated Al Espinosa in a 36-hole playoff: Jones 72–69=141 (−3), Espinosa 84–80=164 (+20).

==== The Amateurs (6) ====
Year	Championship	Winning score	Runner-up
1924	U.S. Amateur	9 & 8	(United States) George Von Elm
1925	U.S. Amateur	8 & 7	(United States) Watts Gunn
1927	U.S. Amateur	8 & 7	(United States) Chick Evans
1928	U.S. Amateur	10 & 9	(England) Philip Perkins
1930	The Amateur Championship	7 & 6	(England) Roger Wethered
1930	U.S. Amateur	8 & 7	(United States) Eugene V. Homans

National Amateur championships were counted as majors at the time. Jones' actual major total using the standard in place in his lifetime was 13.

==== U.S. national team appearances: amateur ====
- Walker Cup: 1922 (winners), 1924 (winners), 1926 (winners), 1928 (winners, playing captain), 1930 (winners, playing captain)

=== Results timeline ===
The majors of Jones' time (those for which as an amateur he was eligible) were the U.S. and British Opens and Amateurs.

Tournament	1916	1917	1918	1919	1920	1921	1922	1923	1924	1925	1926	1927	1928	1929	1930
The Amateur Championship	NT	NT	NT	NT		R32					QF				**1**
The Open Championship	NT	NT	NT	NT		WD					**1** LA	**1** LA			**1** LA
U.S. Open		NT	NT		T8	T5	T2 LA	**1** LA	2 LA	2 LA	**1** LA	T11 LA	2 LA	**1** LA	**1** LA
U.S. Amateur	QF	NT	NT	2 M	SF	QF	SF	R16 M	**1**	**1**	2 M	**1** M	**1**	R32 M	**1** M

Jones retired after his Grand Slam in 1930, playing only his own tournament, The Masters. As an amateur golfer, he was not eligible to compete in the PGA Championship.

Tournament	1934	1935	1936	1937	1938	1939	1940	1941	1942	1943	1944	1945	1946	1947	1948
Masters Tournament	T13	T25	33	T29	T16	T33	WD	40	T28	NT	NT	NT	T32	T55	50

Win
Second
Third
Top 5
Top 10
Did not play

M = Medalist
LA = Low amateur
NT = No tournament
WD = Withdrew
R32, R16, QF, SF = Round in which Jones lost in amateur match play
"T" indicates a tie for a place

Sources for U.S. Open and U.S. Amateur, British Open, 1921 British Amateur, 1926 British Amateur, 1930 British Amateur, and The Masters.

=== Summary ===
Tournament	Wins	2nd	3rd	Top-5	Top-10	Top-25	Events	Cuts made
Masters Tournament	0	0	0	0	0	3	12	–
U.S. Open	4	4	0	9	10	11	11	11
The Open Championship	3	0	0	3	3	3	4	3
U.S. Amateur	5	2	2	11	12	13	13	13
The Amateur Championship	1	0	0	2	2	3	3	–
Totals	13	6	2	25	27	33	43	27

- Most consecutive cuts made – 21 (1916 U.S. Amateur – 1930 U.S. Amateur)
- Longest streak of top-10s – 14 (1921 U.S. Open – 1926 U.S. Amateur)

=== Other records ===
Jones's four titles in the U.S. Open remain tied for the most ever in that championship, along with Willie Anderson, Ben Hogan, and Jack Nicklaus. His four-second-place finishes in the U.S. Open place him second all-time with Sam Snead and Nicklaus. Phil Mickelson holds the record with six (1999, 2002, 2004, 2006, 2009, 2013) second-place finishes. His five titles in the U.S. Amateur are a record. Jones was ranked as the fourth greatest golfer of all time by Golf Digest magazine in 2000. Nicklaus was first, Hogan second, and Snead third. Jones was ranked as the third greatest golfer of all time in a major survey published by Golf Magazine, September 2009. Nicklaus was ranked first, with Tiger Woods second, Hogan fourth, and Snead fifth.

== Films ==
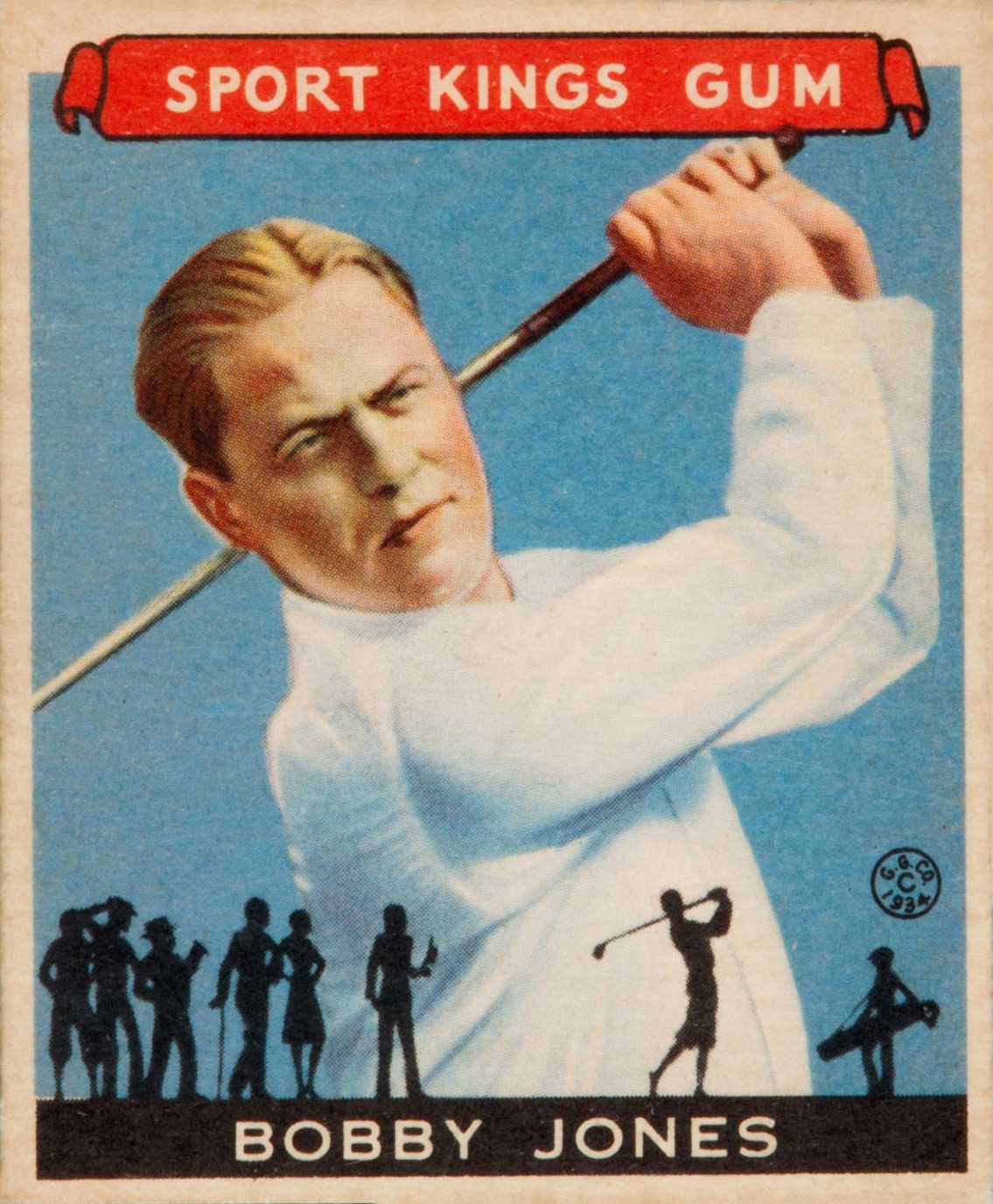
1933 Goudey Sport Kings card

Jones appeared in a series of short instructional films produced by Warner Brothers in 1931 titled How I Play Golf, by Bobby Jones (12 films) and in 1933 titled How to Break 90 (six films). The shorts were designed to be shown in theaters alongside feature films, whereby "would-be golfers of the country can have the Jones' instruction for the price of a theater ticket." Jones indicated at the time of the making of the 1931 series that the films would be "designed as instructive" but not "so complicated that a non-golfer can't understand them."

The films were popular, and Jones gave up his amateur status while earning lucrative contract money for this venture. These films were put into storage and were unavailable for decades, but a surviving print was located sixty years later and put into video format for preservation by Ely Callaway, a distant cousin of Jones's. All 18 shorts were subsequently preserved and released in a DVD collection by Warner Archive on November 6, 2012. They also air occasionally on Turner Classic Movies, usually in the space between features.

Actors and actresses, mostly under contract with Warner Brothers, but also from other studios, volunteered to appear in these 18 episodes. Some of the more well-known actors to appear in the instructional plots included James Cagney, Joe E. Brown, Edward G. Robinson, W.C. Fields, Douglas Fairbanks, Jr., Richard Barthelmess, Richard Arlen, Guy Kibbee, Warner Oland and Loretta Young. Various scenarios involving the actors were used to provide an opportunity for Jones to convey a lesson about a particular part of the game. The shorts were directed by the prolific George Marshall.

=== Title list of the shorts ===
How I Play Golf

- The Putter (April 26, 1931, Film Daily review)
- Chip Shots (April 26)
- The Niblick (May 31)
- The Mashie Niblick (June 5)
- Medium Irons (July 5)
- The Big Irons (July 12)
- The Spoon (July 19)
- The Brassie (August 1)
- The Driver (August 30)
- Trouble Shots (September 13)
- Practice Shots (September 27)
- A Round of Golf (September 4)

How To Break 90

- The Grip (April 17, 1933)
- Position and Backswing (May 15)
- Hip Action (May 20)
- Down Swing (The Downswing) (May 29)
- Impact (July 15)
- Fine Points (August 5)

Jones was the subject of the quasi-biographical 2004 feature film Bobby Jones: A Stroke of Genius in which he was portrayed by Jim Caviezel. The Jones legend was also used to create a supporting character in The Legend of Bagger Vance in 2000, portrayed by Joel Gretsch, and the event where he called his own penalty is used for the fictional protagonist, Rannulph Junuh.

== Bibliography ==
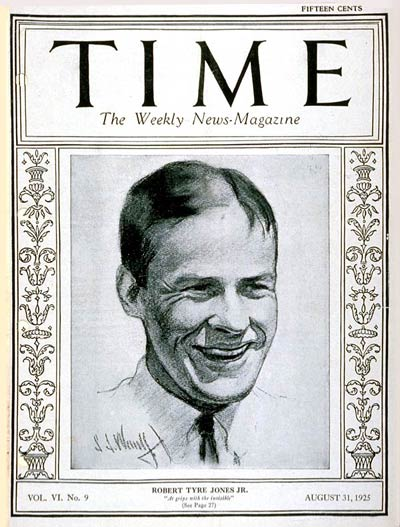
Time, August 31, 1925

Jones authored several books on golf including Down the Fairway with Oscar Bane "O.B." Keeler (1927), The Rights and Wrongs of Golf (1933), Golf Is My Game (1959), Bobby Jones on Golf (1966), and Bobby Jones on the Basic Golf Swing (1968) with illustrator Anthony Ravielli. The 300-copy limited edition of Down the Fairway is considered one of the rarest and most sought-after golf books by collectors. To keep this book readily available to golfers, Herbert Warren Wind included a reproduction of Down the Fairway in his Classics of Golf Library.

Jones has been the subject of several books, most notably The Bobby Jones Story and A Boy's Life of Bobby Jones, both by O.B. Keeler. Other notable texts are The Life and Times of Bobby Jones: Portrait of a Gentleman by Sidney L. Matthew, The Greatest Player Who Never Lived by J. Michael Veron, and Triumphant Journey: The Saga of Bobby Jones and the Grand Slam of Golf by Richard Miller. Published in 2006, The Grand Slam by Mark Frost has received much note as being evocative of Jones's life and times.

In 1934 Agatha Christie wrote the detective novel Why Didn't They Ask Evans? The novel's hero was named Bobby Jones and the book starts with a scene in which he plays golf rather badly.

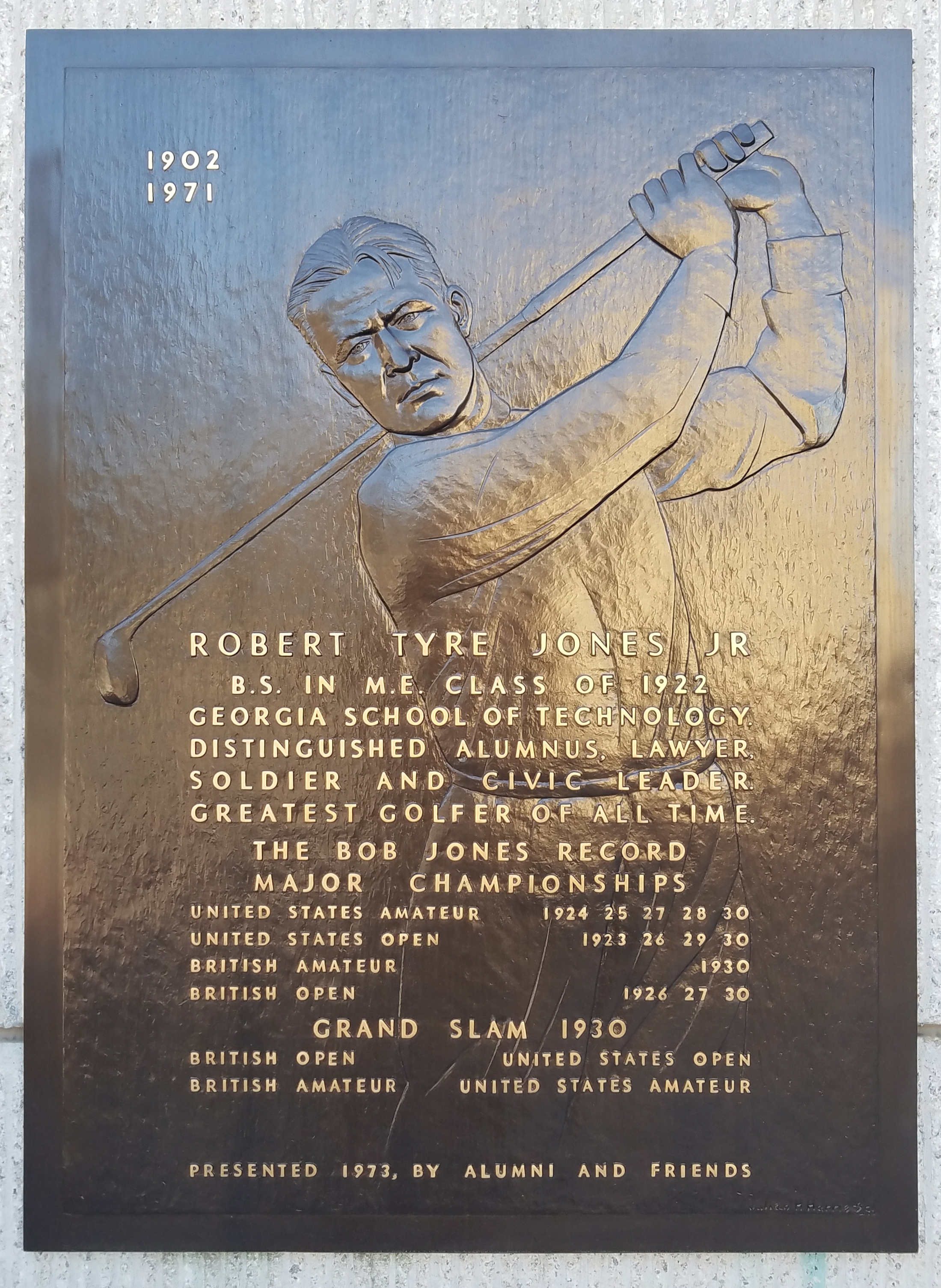
Plaque at Georgia Tech honoring Jones

== Awards and honors ==
- Jones was on the cover of Time magazine on August 31, 1925.
- In 1930, he received the first James E. Sullivan Award, awarded annually by the Amateur Athletic Union (AAU) to the most outstanding amateur athlete in the United States.
- In 1981, the U.S. Postal Service issued an 18-cent stamp commemorating Jones.
- Jones is considered one of the five giants of the 1920s American sports scene, along with baseball's Babe Ruth, boxing's Jack Dempsey, football's Red Grange, and tennis player Bill Tilden.
- He is the only sports figure to receive two ticker-tape parades in New York City, the first in 1926 and the second in 1930.
- Jones is memorialized with a statue in Augusta, Georgia, at the Golf Gardens
- The Bobby Jones Expressway, also known as Interstate 520, is named after him.
- The Georgia Phi chapter house at Georgia Tech is named in his honor.
- Jones was inducted into the World Golf Hall of Fame in 1974.
- A special room is dedicated to Jones's life and accomplishments at the United States Golf Association Museum and Arnold Palmer Center for Golf History in Far Hills, New Jersey.
- The USGA's sportsmanship award is named the Bob Jones Award in his honor.
- In 1966, the governing board and membership of Augusta National passed a resolution naming Jones President in Perpetuity.
- He was inducted into the Georgia Sports Hall of Fame in 1964.

== Personal life ==
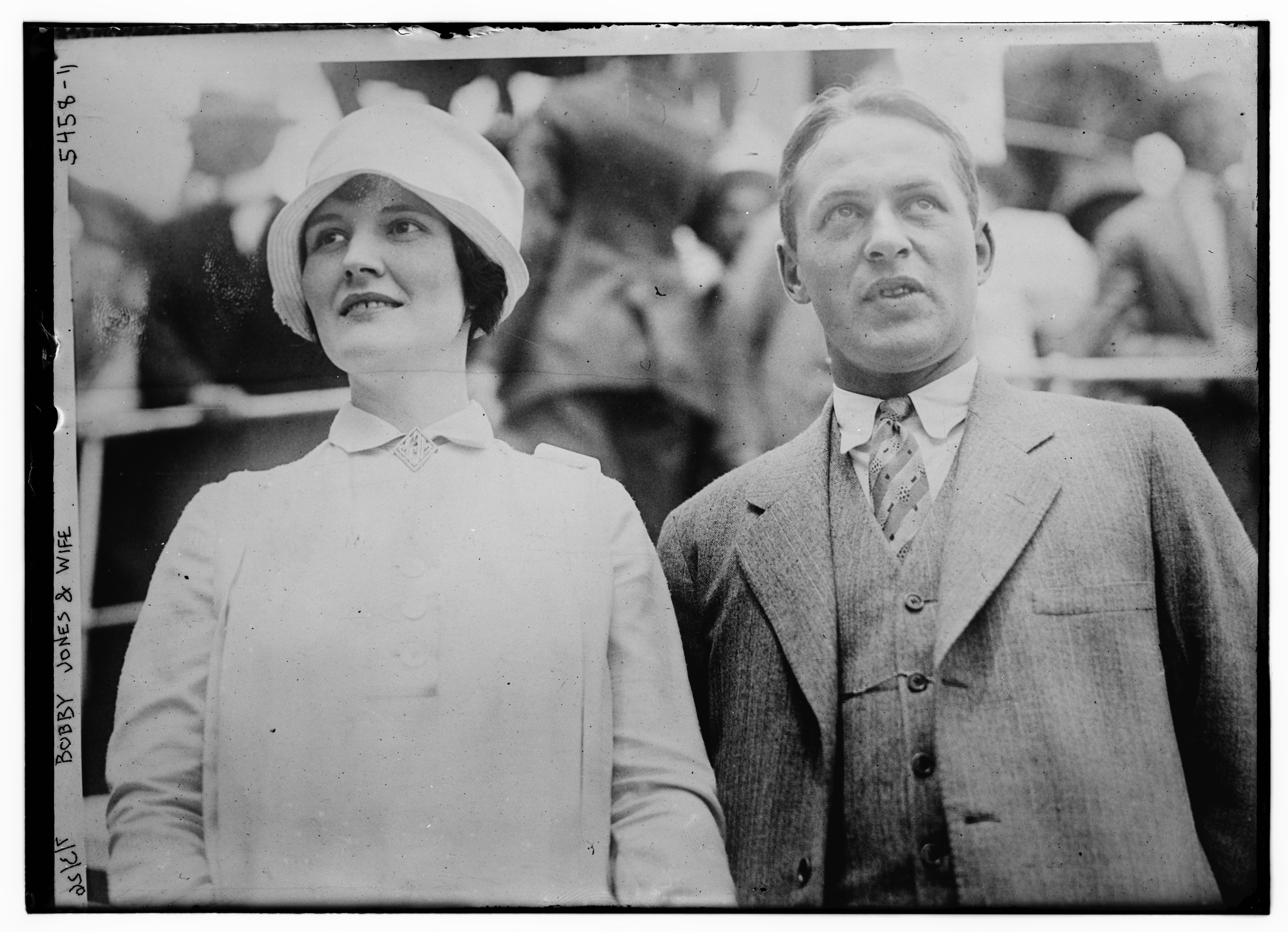
Mary and Bobby Jones

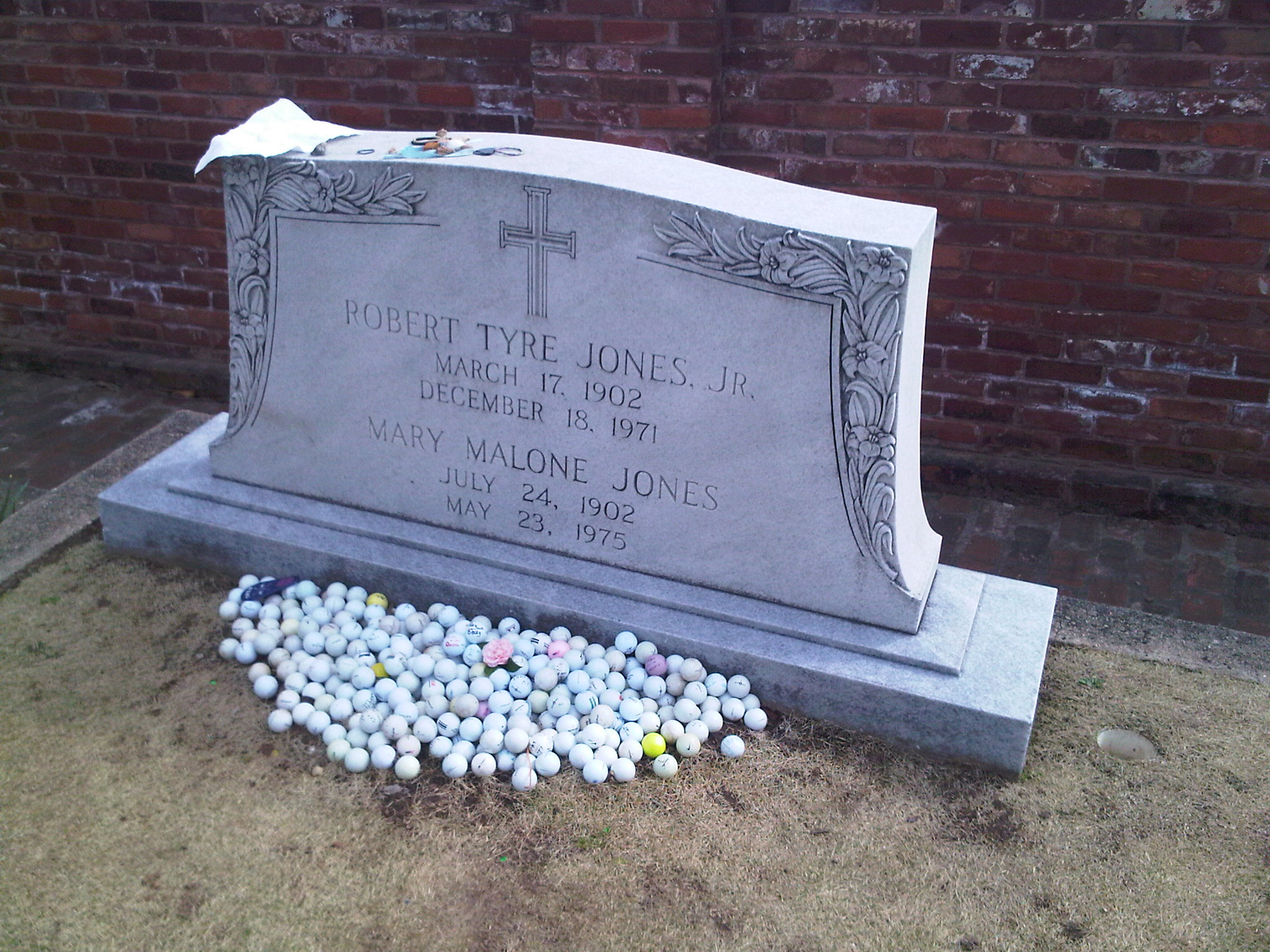
Jones's grave in Atlanta's Oakland Cemetery, with putting green, golf balls, and mementos

Jones married Mary Rice Malone in 1924, whom he met in 1919 while a freshman at Georgia Tech. They had three children: Clara Malone (1925–1994), Robert Tyre III (1926–1973), and Mary Ellen (1931–1977).

When he retired from golf at age 28, he concentrated on his Atlanta law practice.

During World War II, Jones served as an officer in the U.S. Army Air Corps. His superiors wanted him to play exhibition golf in the United States, but Jones was insistent on serving overseas. In 1943, he was promoted to major and trained as an intelligence officer, serving in England with the 84th Fighter Wing, which was part of the Ninth Air Force. While in England, he made the acquaintance of General Dwight D. Eisenhower. Landing in Normandy on June 7, 1944, Jones spent two months with a front line division as a prisoner of war interrogator, reaching the rank of lieutenant colonel. During the war, Jones permitted the U.S. Army to graze cattle on the grounds at Augusta National. He was awarded the American Campaign Medal, European-African-Middle Eastern Campaign Medal and World War II Victory Medal.

In 1948, Jones was diagnosed with syringomyelia, a fluid-filled cavity in the spinal cord that causes crippling pain, then paralysis; he was eventually restricted to a wheelchair. He died in Atlanta on December 18, 1971, three days after converting to Catholicism. Jones was baptized on his deathbed by Monsignor John D. Stapleton, rector of the Cathedral of Christ the King in Atlanta, and attended by the Jones family was buried in Atlanta's historic Oakland Cemetery.

His widow Mary died less than four years later in 1975 at age 72, following the death of their son, Robert T. Jones III, of a heart attack in 1973 at age 47.

The family of Bobby Jones (known as Jonesheirs, Inc.) started the Bobby Jones men's premium apparel line in 1989 through the HMX Group. Bobby Jones men's apparel is a leading premium golf apparel brand. In 2013, Jones Global Sports, an affiliate of C3 Brands, took over operations of the Bobby Jones brand from the HMX Group. The company has an exclusive, worldwide license agreement with the family of Bobby Jones for the use of the Bobby Jones name.

In 2019, the family of Bobby Jones partnered with the Chiari & Syringomyelia Foundation to form the Bobby Jones Chiari & Syringomyelia Foundation (Bobby Jones CSF), a nonprofit which works to raise awareness of Chiari malformation and syringomyelia and to search for a cure. The Bobby Jones Classic golf tournament is an annual fundraiser that supports research and education efforts.

== See also ==
- Bobby Jones Open
- Career Grand Slam champions
- List of golfers with most PGA Tour wins
- List of men's major championships winning golfers
- List of ticker-tape parades in New York City
