= Metropolitan Amateur =

Golf tournament in the United States

The Metropolitan Amateur or Met Amateur is an amateur golf tournament organized by the Metropolitan Golf Association. It has been played annually since 1899 and is one of the oldest amateur golf tournaments in the United States along with the U.S. Amateur and the Western Amateur. It is held at member clubs in New York, New Jersey, and Connecticut.

== Winners ==
- 2026 Christian Cavaliere
- 2025 Dean Greyserman
- 2024 Donte Groppuso
- 2023 Josh German
- 2022 Brad Tilley
- 2021 Garett Engel
- 2020 Jack Wall
- 2019 Chris Gotterup
- 2018 Ryan Davis
- 2017 Matt Mattare
- 2016 Stewart Hagestad
- 2015 Peter Kim
- 2014 David Pastore
- 2013 Pat Wilson
- 2012 Ryan McCormick
- 2011 Mike Miller
- 2010 Evan Beirne
- 2009 Cameron Wilson
- 2008 Tommy McDonagh
- 2007 Greg Rohlf
- 2006 Tommy McDonagh
- 2005 Ronald Vannelli
- 2004 Andrew Svoboda
- 2003 Michael Stamberger
- 2002 Johnson Wagner
- 2001 Johnson Wagner
- 2000 David Kwon
- 1999 Greg Rohlf
- 1998 Jerry Courville Jr.
- 1997 Jerry Courville Jr.
- 1996 Ken Bakst
- 1995 Jerry Courville Jr.
- 1994 Dennis Hillman
- 1993 Jeff Putman
- 1992 Mike Muehr
- 1991 Dennis Slezak
- 1990 John Baldwin
- 1989 Dick Siderowf
- 1988 Jim McGovern
- 1987 George Zahringer
- 1986 George Zahringer
- 1985 George Zahringer
- 1984 George Zahringer
- 1983 Mark Diamond
- 1982 George Zahringer
- 1981 Peter Van Ingen
- 1980 Howard Pierson
- 1979 Jerry Courville, Sr.
- 1978 Mike Burke Jr.
- 1977 Dave Ferrell
- 1976 Bill Britton
- 1975 Bill Britton
- 1974 Dick Siderowf
- 1973 Jerry Courville, Sr.
- 1972 George Burns
- 1971 Richard Spears
- 1970 Dick Siderowf
- 1969 Dick Siderowf
- 1968 Dick Siderowf
- 1967 John C. Baldwin
- 1966 James E. Fisher
- 1965 Mark J. Stuart Jr.
- 1964 Robert W. Gardner
- 1963 Robert W. Gardner
- 1962 Robert W. Gardner
- 1961 Robert W. Gardner
- 1960 Robert W. Gardner
- 1959 Paul Kelly
- 1958 Robert W. Gardner
- 1957 Paul Kelly
- 1956 Thomas J. Goodwin
- 1955 Bobby Kuntz
- 1954 Frank Strafaci
- 1953 Wilson Barnes Jr.
- 1952 Joseph Marra
- 1951 Joe Gagliardi
- 1950 Frank Strafaci
- 1949 Joseph McBride
- 1948 Ray Billows
- 1947 Frank Strafaci
- 1946 Frank Strafaci
- 1945 Frank Strafaci
- 1944 E.H. Driggs Jr.
- 1942–1943 No tournament
- 1941 Michael Cestone
- 1940 John P. Burke
- 1939 Frank Strafaci
- 1938 Frank Strafaci
- 1937 Willie Turnesa
- 1936 George Dunlap
- 1935 John Parker Jr.
- 1934 T.S. Tailer Jr.
- 1933 Mark J. Stuart
- 1932 T.S. Tailer Jr.
- 1931 Leonard Martin
- 1930 M.J. McCarthy Jr.
- 1929 M.J. McCarthy Jr.
- 1928 Eugene Homans
- 1927 E.H. Driggs Jr.
- 1926 W.M. Reekie
- 1925 Jess Sweetser
- 1924 W.M. Reekie
- 1923 F.W. Dyer
- 1922 Jess Sweetser
- 1921 G.W. White
- 1920 D.E. Sawyer
- 1919 Oswald Kirkby
- 1917–1918 No tournament
- 1916 Oswald Kirkby
- 1915 Walter Travis
- 1914 Oswald Kirkby
- 1913 Jerome Travers
- 1912 Jerome Travers
- 1911 Jerome Travers
- 1910 F. Herreshoff
- 1909 Walter Travis
- 1908 Charles H. Seely
- 1907 Jerome Travers
- 1906 Jerome Travers
- 1905 Charles H. Seely
- 1904 H. Wilcox
- 1903 Findlay Douglas
- 1902 Walter Travis
- 1901 Findlay Douglas
- 1900 Walter Travis
- 1899 Herbert M. Harriman
