= Oswald Kirkby =

American amateur golfer (1886–1934)

Oswald Kirkby (February 18, 1886 – February 27, 1934) was an amateur golfer. He won three New Jersey Amateurs, three Metropolitan Amateurs, the 1911 Nassau Invitational, and the 1921 Garden City Club Invitational. He was one of the six golfers to be assigned no handicap when the United States Golf Association issued its first handicap report in 1912. He was runner-up in the Metropolitan Amateur in 1911 and 1912, to Jerome Travers.

A resident of Englewood, New Jersey, Kirkby died of pneumonia at Englewood Hospital on February 27, 1934.
