= Cape Cod Open =

Golf tournament in Massachusetts, US

The Cape Cod Open was a golf event in the early 1930s. The tournament was held at Eastward Ho!, a links course in Chatham, Massachusetts, on the Cape Cod Peninsula. The event was generally known for its strong fields and windy weather. The first event, won by English golfer Jim Barnes in 1930, was later deemed to be an official PGA Tour win.

== History ==
The first event was held in 1930. It was hosted by Eastward Ho! in Chatham, Massachusetts. The Boston Globe featured a full-length preview of the inaugural event. The journalist W.A. Whitcomb deemed that the amateur Jess Sweetser and professional Joe Turnesa were the favorites because they had the two lowest scores of all-time at the course. Other notable golfers scheduled to play were Francis Ouimet and Johnny Farrell. The event was sanctioned by the Massachusetts Golf Association. It was intended to be 72-holes-long and held over two days, on Friday August 22 and Saturday August 23. The purse was $900. There were more than 60 players at the event. Late in the week, it was announced that Jim Barnes and Bobby Cruickshank were "among the late entries" for the tournament. On Friday, the tournament began. It was reported by the Associated Press that a "strong northeast wind raised havoc with the scores." Barnes and Turnesa held the first round lead at 76. After a second round 73, Barnes was the solo leader. He held a seven-stroke lead over Silas Newton. Turnesa, Jack Curley, and Sweetser followed them respectively. In the third round, Barnes shot an 80 but playing against a "fierce northeast wind and rainstorm" it was enough to maintain the lead. In the final round, he shot a 76, the second best round of the day, to finish at 305 to defeat Sweetser by 12 shots. Curley finished at 319, in solo third place.

The second Cape Cod Open was held the following August. According to the Associated Press, there was again a "strong field" as well as challenging, "wind-swept" weather. The event was two rounds long. Jess Sweetser opened the tournament with a "brilliant" 33 on the outward half and ultimately scored a first round 72. He recorded a second round 78 to win. He defeated Charles McAndrew of Quincy, Massachusetts by one shot.

The third and final event was played at Eastward Ho! in August 1932. There were 77 players in the field. Defending champion Jess Sweetser "was unable to play because of illness." Conditions were relatively similar as previous years with "heavy showers" and "gale swept" winds. Roland Hancock, a club pro from Unicorn Club in Stoneham, Massachusetts, shot a one-over-par 73 to take the solo lead. He led by one over Jim Shephard, Joe Turnesa, and Tom Kerrigan. Other notable names near the lead included Ted Bishop, Mike Turnesa, Jack Curley, Leo Diegel, and Johnny Farrell. In the second and final round, Curley shot a 71 (−1) to defeat Hancock by one shot. Farrell and Kerrigan finished another shot back at 149.

A fourth tournament was scheduled for 1933. However, it was cancelled days before the event was supposed to begin.

This event is different from the modern Cape Cod Open founded in 1992. That event is now entitled the Jim & Lois Gaquin Memorial Cape Cod Open.

== Winners ==
Year	Winner	Score	Margin of victory	Runners-up	Ref.
1930	(England) Jim Barnes	305	12 strokes	(United States) Jess Sweetser (a)	
1931	(United States) Jess Sweetser (a)	150	1 stroke	(United States) Charles McAndrew	
1932	(United States) Jack Curley	148	1 stoke	(United States) Roland Hancock	
~~1933~~	Cancelled				
