= National Golf Links of America =

Golf course in Southampton, New York

Coordinates: 40.909444°N 72.450833°W

- Interactive map of National Golf Links of America

Club information
- Location: Southampton, New York
- Established: 1911
- Type: Private
- Total holes: 18
- Tournaments: Walker Cup (1922, 2013)
- Designed by: Charles B. Macdonald
- Par: 72
- Length: 6,873 yards
- Course rating: 73.6
- Slope rating: 137

National Golf Links of America is a links-style golf course in Southampton, New York, located on Long Island between Shinnecock Hills Golf Club and Peconic Bay. Though the course is noted for hosting the initial Walker Cup in 1922, which the United States won 8 and 4, it has never hosted a major men's championship. The Walker Cup was again held at the National in 2013.

== History ==
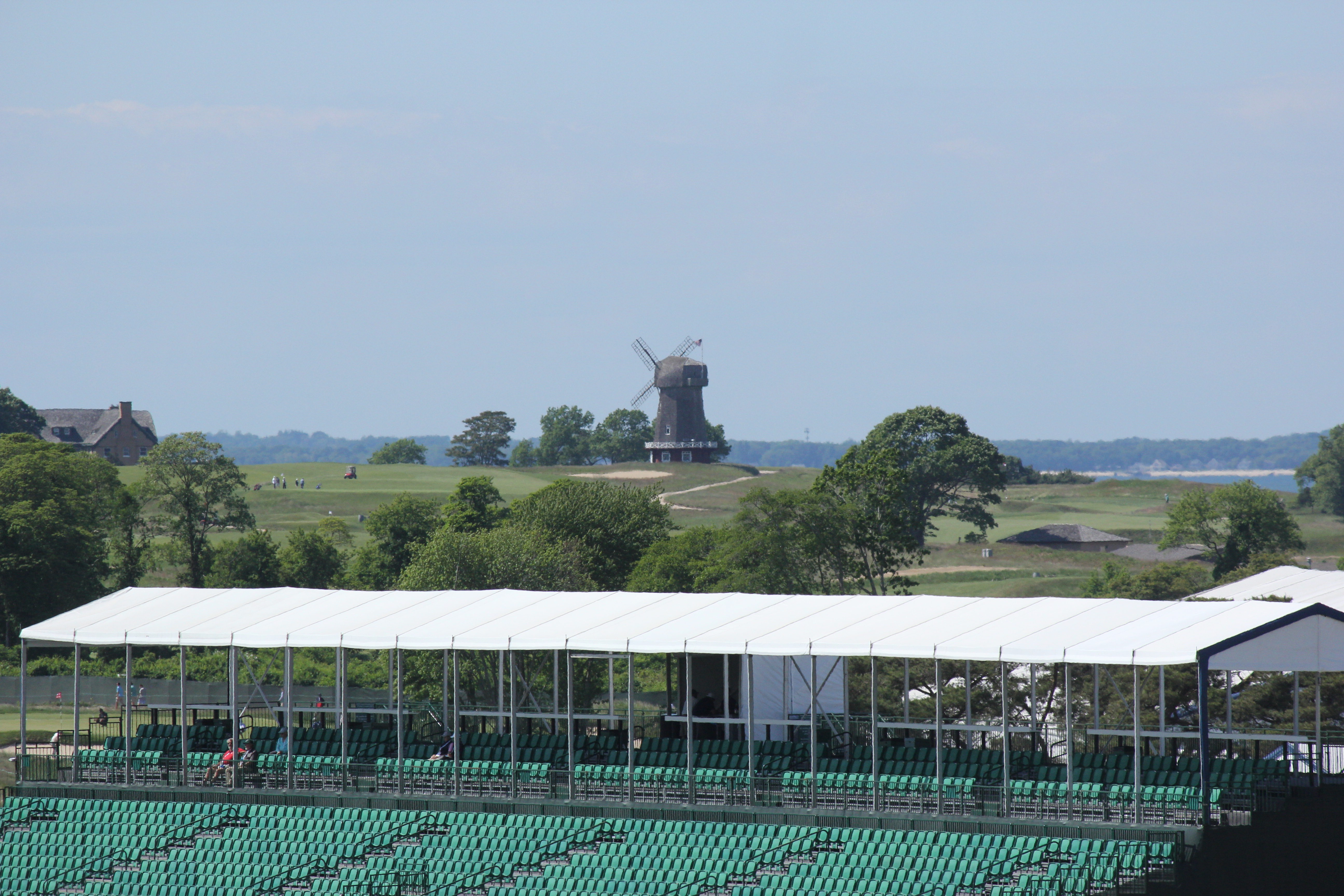
Windmill at National as viewed from Shinnecock Hills

The course was designed by Charles B. Macdonald, who had been schooled at the University of St Andrews in Scotland during the 1870s. Macdonald was introduced to golf at St. Andrews old course, playing many rounds there with Tom Morris, Sr. and Tom Morris, Jr., both of whom were multiple winners of the Open Championship, founded in 1860 as the first major championship in golf.

Macdonald, the founder and original designer of the Chicago Golf Club, had been paired with John Shippen, an African American, in the 1896 U.S. Open at Shinnecock Hills. Following the event, he quit Shinnecock and founded the new club. He set out to design a course that would rival the prominent golf courses located abroad, looking at potential sites in Cape Cod and Napeague before settling on a plot of land on Sebonac Neck next to Peconic Bay. Macdonald relied on his extensive knowledge of Britain's finest holes, using them as templates for his new course.

The course was constructed adjacent to Shinnecock Hills Golf Club, and now also borders Sebonack Golf Club, which opened in 2006. Construction of the golf course was supervised by Seth Raynor, a local civil engineer from Long Island who went on to design several golf courses of his own, including the Fishers Island Club.

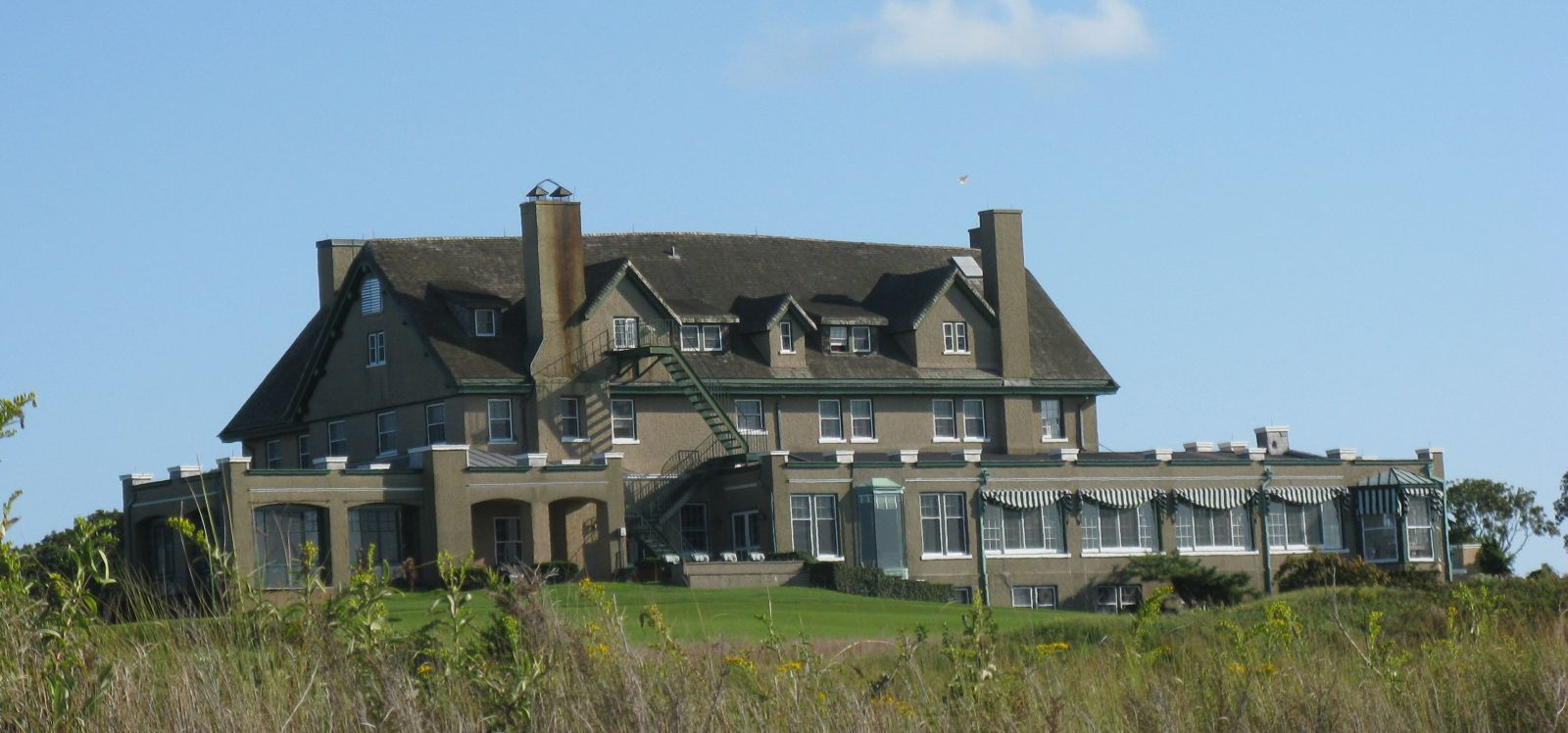
Jarvis Hunt designed the club house that overlooks Peconic Bay

When it opened in 1911, the course was called the National Golf Links of America because its 67 founding members, who included Robert Bacon, George W. Baxter, Urban H. Broughton, Charles Deering, James Deering, Findlay S. Douglas, Henry Clay Frick, Elbert Henry Gary, Clarence Mackay, De Lancey Nicoll, James A. Stillman, Walter Travis, and William Kissam Vanderbilt II, resided in various parts of the United States. The clubhouse was designed by Jarvis Hunt, one of the club's founding members. James Hepburn—one of the founding members of the PGA of America—served as one of the early head professionals, working at the club from 1914 until 1928. There is a small bar half-way round the course which contains P.G. Wodehouse memorabilia, and the course is mentioned, surprisingly negatively, in the preface to The Heart of a Goof short story collection.

The National Golf Links of America was selected as the host of the 2013 Walker Cup in September 2008. In 2009, "The National" was ranked 15th in Golf Digest's list of America's 100 Greatest Golf Courses.

The current head golf professional is Jim Morris.

On April 18, 2018, the right wing of the building caught fire, but was extinguished by local fire departments causing minimal damage to the exterior.

== Course design ==
National Golf Links of America is laid out over 250 acres (1.0 km^{2}). The course is a par 72 and plays 6,873 yards (6,285 m) from the back tees. Many of the holes were patterned from famous golf courses in the British Isles and adapted to fit the local setting:

- The 2nd hole, named "Sahara", is a par four modeled after the 3rd hole at Royal St. George.
- The 3rd hole, named "Alps", is a par four that requires a blind approach shot to the green, similar to the 17th hole at Prestwick.
- The 4th hole, named "Redan", is a par three that copied the 15th hole at North Berwick, the site of the original Redan hole.
- The 7th hole, named "St. Andrews", is a par five that was designed based on the 17th hole (Road Hole) at St. Andrews.
- The 8th hole, named "Bottle", is a par four that resembles the 12th hole at Sunningdale Golf Club.
- The 13th hole, named "Eden", is a par three that replicates the 11th hole at St. Andrews.

Some of the other holes were original designs, the most notable of which is the par four 14th hole. It was named "Cape" because the green was located on a small peninsula that jutted into a bay. The green was later moved during construction of Sebonac Inlet Road but is now surrounded on three sides by a large bunker. A unique feature on the golf course is a windmill located between the 2nd and 16th holes. A member once remarked that a windmill would make a nice addition to the course, so Macdonald purchased one when he was in Europe and sent the member the bill.

National Golf Links of America
Tee	Rating/Slope	1	2	3	4	5	6	7	8	9	Out	10	11	12	13	14	15	16	17	18	In	Total
Back	73.6/137	327	330	426	195	478	141	478	424	540	3339	450	432	435	174	365	397	404	375	502	3534	6873
Middle	71.7/133	307	270	411	177	466	131	462	404	532	3160	429	408	388	161	336	367	381	350	478	3298	6458
Forward	68.8/127	289	240	378	159	451	110	406	286	514	2833	391	370	352	147	286	311	360	319	448	2984	5817
Par		4	4	4	3	4	3	5	4	5	36	4	4	4	3	4	4	4	4	5	36	72
SI		11	15	1	13	9	17	7	3	5		2	8	4	18	14	12	10	16	6
