= Ekwanok Country Club =

Golf course in Manchester, Vermont

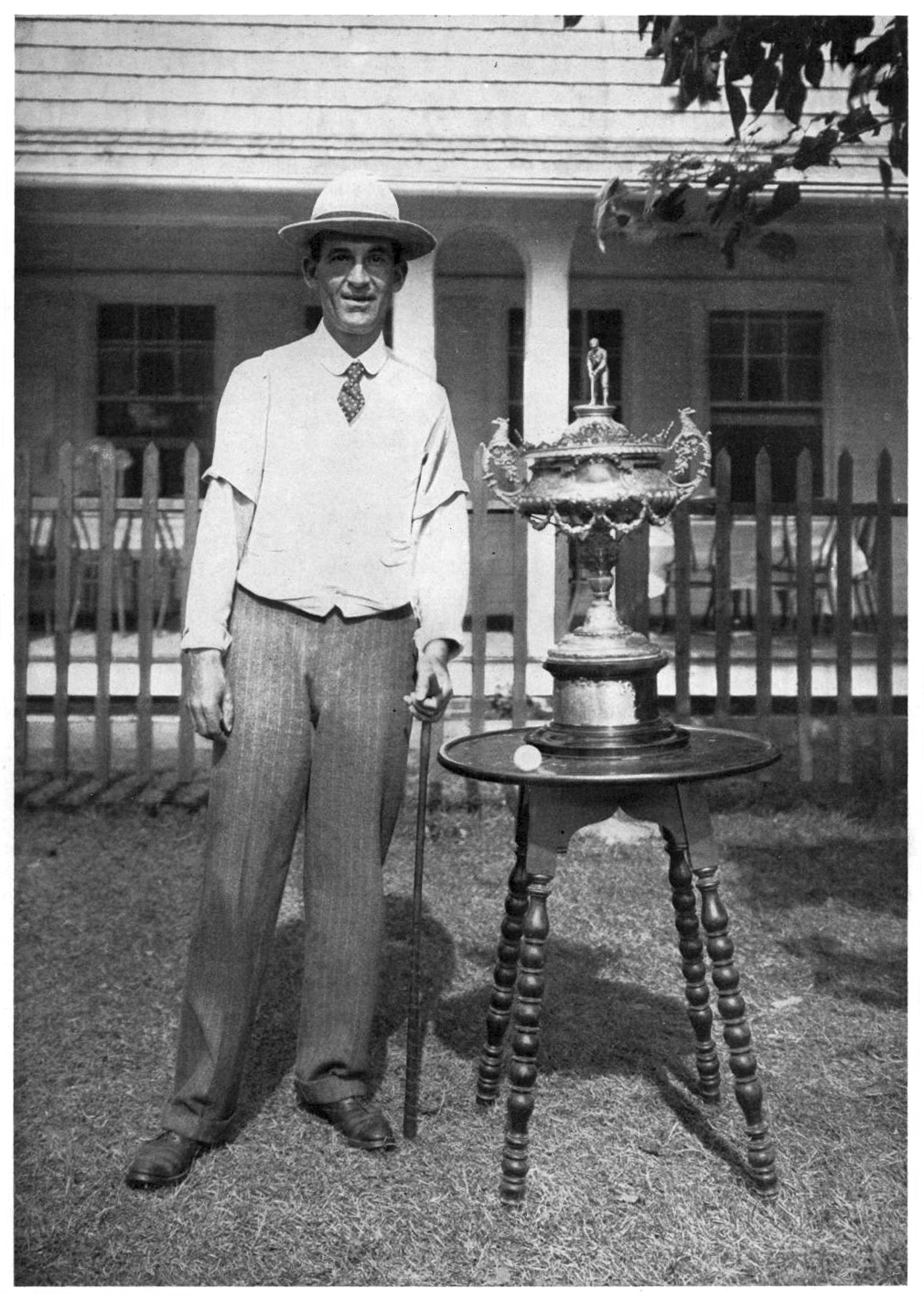
- Walter Travis - Ekwanok Country Club architect
- Interactive map of Ekwanok Country Club
- 43°9′29″N 73°3′46″W

Club information
- Location: Manchester, Vermont
- Established: 1899
- Tournaments: U.S. Amateur: 1914; New England Amateur: 1937, 1953
- Designed by: Walter Travis
- Length: 6,082 yards

Ekwanok Country Club is a golf course in Manchester, Vermont. It was built by Walter Travis.

== Early history ==
Ekwanok is among Walter Travis' best-known works. The Ekwanok Country Club is very "old school," and it was Travis's first involvement in golf course architecture. Today, it is recognized as the finest course in the Green Mountain State by Golf Digest.

Ekwanok was one of the longest courses in the country when it opened in 1899, at a mere 6,082 yards.

In 1914, Francis Ouimet won the U.S. Amateur, defeating Jerry Travers, 6 and 5, in the 36-hole final. After that U.S. Amateur, Ekwanok Country Club, of its own volition, quietly withdrew from the national golf scene.

== Restoration ==
Since 2011, the Ekwanok Club has begun a restoration of the course's original bunkers and greens, some that had been lost or modified over the years. Bruce Hepner of Renaissance Designs was hired to complete these changes.

Ekwanok's restoration followed many of the original principles of Walter Travis. Ekwanok preserved the unique Travis features and history of the course for the enjoyment of future generations.

== Seventh hole ==
The most well-known hole at Ekwanok is the seventh hole, which is a par 5 playing 595 yards. It is quite a long hole considering the average hole's distance around the time that it was built.

The golf course was designed around the area's natural features. Notably, the course contains a hole with a hill that bisects the fairway from the 300 to 370 yard mark.
