= Findlay S. Douglas =

Scottish amateur golfer (1874–1959)

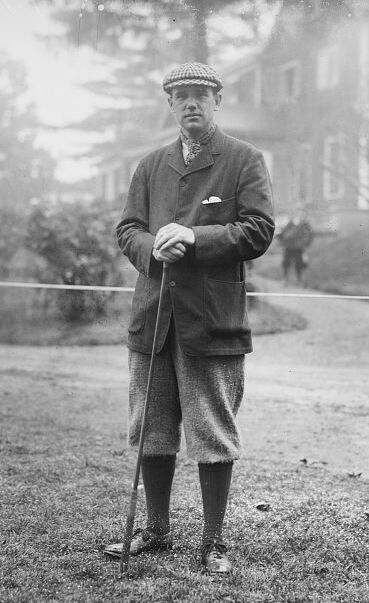
- Douglas in 1927

Personal information
- Full name: Findlay Small Douglas
- Nationality: Scotland
- Born: 17 November 1874 St Andrews, Scotland
- Died: 29 March 1959 (aged 84)

Career
- Sport: Golf
- College: University of St Andrews
- Status: Amateur

Best results in major championships (wins: 1)
- U.S. Open: 8th: 1903
- The Open Championship: DNP
- U.S. Amateur: Won: 1898
- British Amateur: R256: 1913, 1920

Achievements and awards
- Bob Jones Award: 1959

Findlay Small Douglas (17 November 1874 – 29 March 1959) was a Scottish amateur golfer who won the U.S. Amateur in 1898, and later became President of the United States Golf Association (USGA).

== Early life ==
Born in St Andrews, Scotland, Douglas learned to play golf as a boy. He attended the University of St Andrews from 1892 to 1896, and played on the golf team. After graduation, he followed his oldest brother Robert and emigrated to the United States in 1897.

== Golf career ==
Douglas qualified for the U.S. Amateur in 1897, but lost in the semifinal. In 1898 he won the event, defeating Walter B. Smith 5 & 3 in the final match. He was the last Scot to win the tournament until 2006, when Richie Ramsay won. Douglas made it to the final match in 1899 and again in 1900, but lost to H.M. Harriman and Walter Travis respectively. In his only U.S. Open appearance in 1903, Douglas finished 8th, winning low amateur. He won the Metropolitan Amateur in 1901 and 1903.

Douglas joined several golf clubs in the New York area, and helped start others. In 1908, he was one of the 70 founders of the National Golf Links of America. Eventually, Douglas got involved in administrative roles, and served in various capacities at the Metropolitan Golf Association for 17 years, including president from 1922 to 1924.

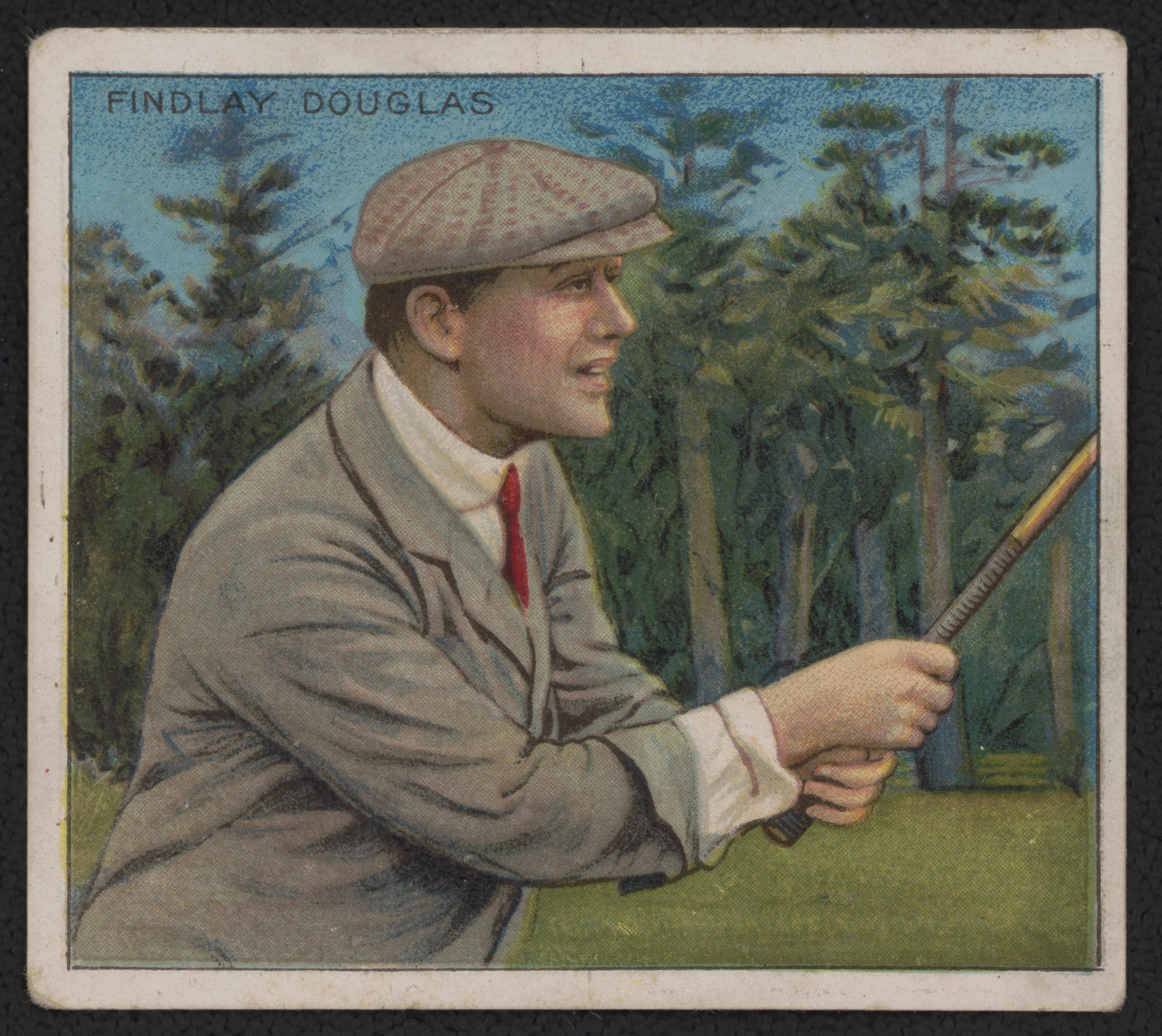
Douglas on a 1910 tobacco card.

In 1926, Douglas became vice-president of the United States Golf Association, and then from 1929 to 1930 served as president. He presented Bobby Jones with the U.S. Open and U.S. Amateur trophies during Jones' Grand Slam in 1930.

Douglas later got involved with senior golf, winning the championship of the United States Senior's Golf Association (not affiliated with the USGA) in 1932, and later served as the organization's president from 1937 to 1941. This was the forerunner to the USGA's U.S. Senior Amateur, which was started in 1955.

== Death and legacy ==
He died on Easter Sunday in 1959 with no surviving family, and his ashes were buried in a family plot in St Andrews. In the late 1990s, the Royal and Ancient club restored the headstone, which had deteriorated, and added an inscription with Douglas' name, which had not been there.

== Awards and honors ==
In 1959, Douglas was the USGA's Bob Jones Award winner in 1959, given in recognition of distinguished sportsmanship in golf

== Amateur wins ==
- 1898 U.S. Amateur
- 1901 Metropolitan Amateur
- 1903 Metropolitan Amateur
- 1932 United States Senior's Golf Association Championship

== Results in major championships ==
=== Amateur wins (1) ===
Year	Championship	Winning score	Runner-up
1898	U.S. Amateur	5 & 3	(United States) Walter B. Smith

=== Results timeline ===
Note: Douglas played in only the U.S. Open, U.S. Amateur, and The Amateur Championship.

Tournament	1897	1898	1899
U.S. Open	19		
U.S. Amateur	SF	1	2
The Amateur Championship			

Tournament	1900	1901	1902	1903	1904	1905	1906	1907	1908	1909
U.S. Open				8 LA						T23
U.S. Amateur	2	SF		R128					R32	
The Amateur Championship										

Tournament	1910	1911	1912	1913	1914	1915	1916	1917	1918	1919
U.S. Open								NT	NT	
U.S. Amateur								NT	NT	
The Amateur Championship				R256		NT	NT	NT	NT	NT

Tournament	1920	1921	1922	1923	1924
U.S. Open					
U.S. Amateur					DNQ
The Amateur Championship	R256				

Win
Top 10
Did not play

LA = Low amateur
NT = No tournament
"T" indicates a tie for a place
DNQ = Did not qualify for match play portion
R256, R128, R64, R32, R16, QF, SF = Round in which player lost in match play

Source for U.S. Open and U.S. Amateur: USGA Championship Database

Source for 1913 British Amateur: The American Golfer, July 1913, pg. 222.

Source for 1920 British Amateur: The Glasgow Herald, 8 June 1920, pg. 12.
