= Jess Sweetser =

American amateur golfer

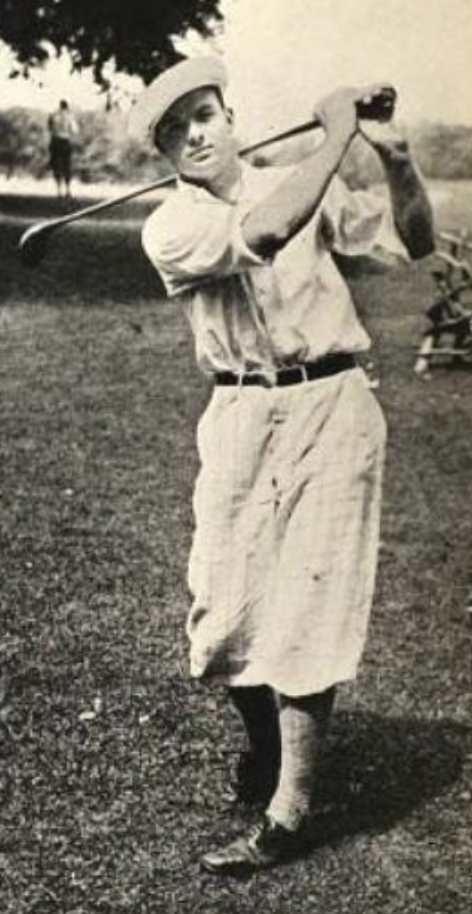
- Sweetser in 1925

Personal information
- Full name: Jesse William Sweetser
- Nationality: United States
- Born: April 18, 1902 St. Louis, Missouri, U.S.
- Died: May 27, 1989 (aged 87) Bethesda, Maryland, U.S.
- Spouses: Agnes Isobel "Nan" Lewis Sweetser; Virginia Lee Sweetser
- Children: 3

Career
- Sport: Golf
- College: Yale University
- Status: Amateur

Best results in major championships (wins: 2)
- Masters Tournament: T29: 1939
- PGA Championship: DNP
- U.S. Open: T14: 1920
- The Open Championship: DNP
- U.S. Amateur: Won: 1922
- British Amateur: Won: 1926

Achievements and awards
- Bob Jones Award: 1986

Jesse William Sweetser (April 18, 1902 – May 27, 1989) was an amateur golfer, best known as the first American-born player to win the British Amateur.

== Early life and college career ==
In 1902, Sweetser was born in St. Louis, Missouri. He later attended Phillips Exeter Academy.

For college, Sweetser attended Yale University. He was a member of the Yale Bulldogs golf team. In 1920, Sweetser won the individual title at the NCAA Division I Men's Golf Championships. While at Yale, Sweetser regularly played the U.S. Amateur. He played the 1922 U.S. Amateur at the age of 20, defeating Bobby Jones, 8 and 7, in the semi-final and then Chick Evans, 3 and 2, in the final match. The following year, at the 1923 U.S. Amateur, he again made it to the finals again but lost on the second playoff hole to Max Marston. He also played on the original Walker Cup team in 1922.

== Golf career ==
In his professional life, Sweetser started work as a stockbroker in the 1920s, and later went to work for Curtiss-Wright. He still played high-level amateur golf during this timeframe. In 1926, Sweetser won the British Amateur at Muirfield, defeating Scottish amateur Fred Simpson, 6 and 5, in the final match. He continued to play for the American team of the Walker Cup team for the remainder of the 1920s. He was also selected for the 1930 team but withdrew for business reasons.

In 1967, Sweetser retired as vice-president of Martin Marietta. In his retirement, he maintained involvement with the golf world. In 1967 and 1973, he was the captain of the American Walker Cup team. Sweetser also served as treasurer and on the executive committee of the United States Golf Association late in life.

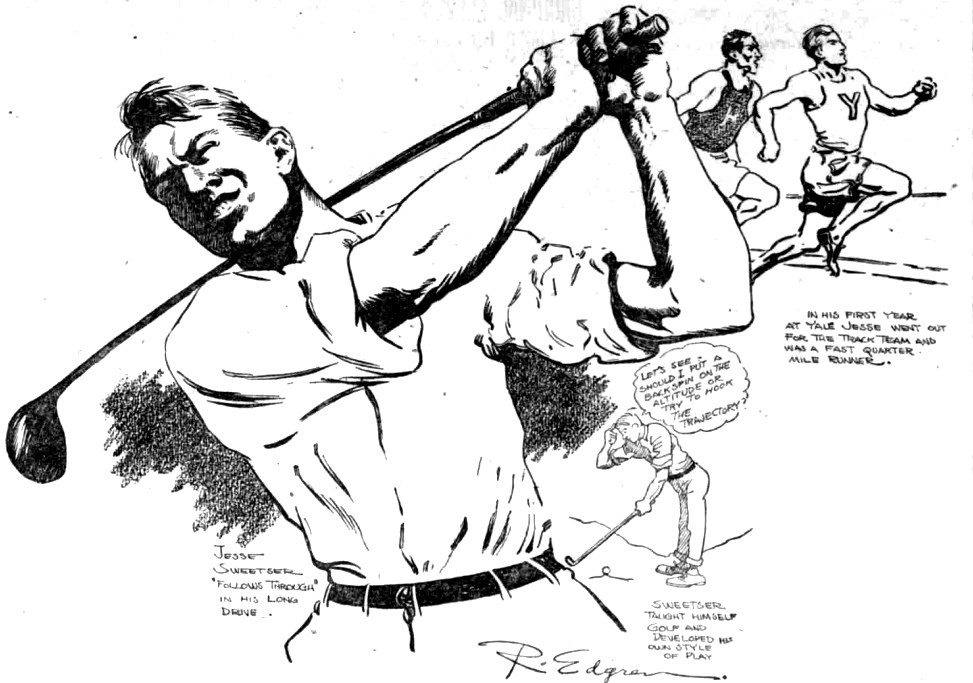
A sketch of amateur golfer Jess Sweetser by Robert Edgren

== Death ==
Sweetser died on May 27, 1989, in Bethesda, Maryland.

== Awards and honors ==
In 1986, he was named the Bob Jones Award winner, given in recognition of distinguished sportsmanship in golf.

== Tournament wins ==
this list may be incomplete

- 1920 NCAA Championship
- 1922 U.S. Amateur, Metropolitan Amateur
- 1923 Gold Mashie Tournament
- 1925 Metropolitan Amateur, Gold Golf Ball Tourney (with Glenna Collett), Gibson Island Club Invitational
- 1926 British Amateur
- 1927 Gold Mashie Tournament
- 1931 Cape Cod Open

== Major championships ==
=== Wins (2) ===
Year	Championship	Winning score	Runner-up
1922	U.S. Amateur	3 & 2	(United States) Chick Evans
1926	British Amateur	6 & 5	(Scotland) Fred Simpson

=== Results timeline ===
Tournament	1919	1920	1921	1922	1923	1924	1925	1926	1927	1928	1929
U.S. Open		T14			WD						
U.S. Amateur	DNQ	R16	QF	1	2	DNQ	QF			R16	QF
British Amateur					R256			1			

Tournament	1930	1931	1932	1933	1934	1935	1936	1937	1938	1939	1940
Masters Tournament	NYF	NYF	NYF	NYF	58		WD	40	33	T29	
U.S. Open											
U.S. Amateur	SF		DNQ		R64		R128		R32		R16
British Amateur											NT

Sweetser played in the Masters each year from 1952 to 1955 but withdrew on each occasion.

Win
Top 10
Did not play

NYF = Tournament not yet founded
NT = No tournament
DNQ = Did not qualify for match play portion
R128, R64, R32, R16, QF, SF = Round in which player lost in match play

Source for The Masters: www.masters.com

Source for U.S. Open and U.S. Amateur: USGA Championship Database

Source for 1923 British Amateur: The American Golfer, July, 1923, pg. 10.

Source for 1926 British Amateur: The American Golfer, July, 1926, pg. 9.

== U.S. national team appearances ==
Amateur

- Walker Cup: 1922 (winners), 1923 (winners), 1924 (winners), 1926 (winners), 1928 (winners), 1932 (winners), 1967 (winners, non-playing captain), 1973 (winners, non-playing captain)
