= U.S. Amateur =

Annual golf tournament in the United States

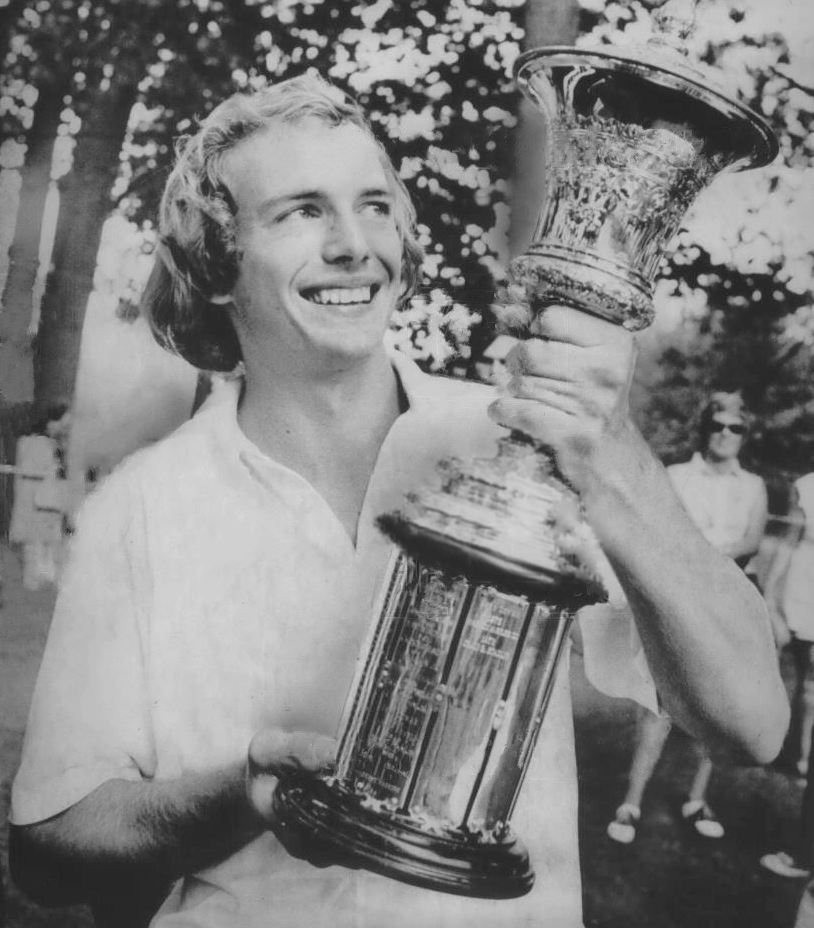
- Jerry Pate with U.S. Amateur trophy, 1974

Tournament information
- Location: Philadelphia, Pennsylvania (2026)
- Established: 1895
- Course: Merion Golf Club (2026)
- Par: 70 (2026)
- Length: 6,939 yd (6,345 m) (2026)
- Organized by: USGA
- Format: Stroke play and match play
- Month played: August
- Website: Official website

Current champion
- (England) Jack Whaley (2026)

The United States Amateur Championship, commonly known as the U.S. Amateur, is the leading annual golf tournament in the United States for amateur golfers. It is organized by the United States Golf Association and is currently held each August over a 7-day period.

== History ==
In 1894, there were two tournaments called the "National Amateur Championship". One of them was played at Newport Country Club and was won by William G. Lawrence, and the other took place at Saint Andrew's Golf Club and was won by Laurence B. Stoddart. This state of affairs prompted Charles B. Macdonald of the Chicago Golf Club to call for the creation of a national governing body to authorize an official national championship, and the Amateur Golf Association of the United States, which was soon to be renamed the United States Golf Association, was formed on December 22 of that year. In 1895 it organized both the first U.S. Amateur Championship and the first U.S. Open, both of which were played at Newport Country Club.

There are no age or gender restrictions on entry, but players must have a handicap index of 0.4 or less. Originally, entry was restricted to members of USGA-affiliated private clubs (and, presumably, international players who were members of private clubs affiliated with their nations' golf governing bodies), a restriction that was not lifted until 1979. The tournament consists of two days of stroke play, with the leading 64 competitors then playing a knockout competition held at match play to decide the champion. All knockout matches are over 18 holes except for the final, which consists of 36 holes, separated into morning and afternoon 18-hole rounds. Nowadays it is usually won by players in their late teens or early twenties who are working towards a career as a tournament professional. Before World War II more top-level golfers chose to remain amateur, and the average age of U.S. Amateur champions was higher.

Many of the leading figures in the history of golf have been U.S. Amateur champions, including Bobby Jones five times, Jerome Travers four times, Jack Nicklaus twice and Tiger Woods three times (all consecutive; the only player to win three in a row). Woods' first win, as an 18-year-old in 1994, made him the youngest winner of the event, breaking the previous record of 19 years 5 months set by Robert Gardner in 1909. In 2008, New Zealander Danny Lee became the youngest ever winner, only to be eclipsed by 17-year-old An Byeong-hun the following year. Before the professional game became dominant, the event was regarded as one of the majors. This is no longer the case, but the champion still receives an automatic invitation to play in all of the majors except the PGA Championship. In addition, the runner-up also receives an invitation to play in the Masters and the U.S. Open. The golfers must maintain their amateur status at the time the events are held (unless they qualify for the tournaments by other means). The USGA added an exception starting with the 2019 U.S. Amateur Championship in that the tournament winner only may turn professional and keep his berth for the ensuing U.S. Open.

With the growth in professional golf through the latter half of the 20th century, the U.S. Amateur has become dominated by younger players destined to soon become professionals. In 1981 the USGA established a new championship called the U.S. Mid-Amateur for amateurs aged at least 25 years old in order to give players who had not joined the professional ranks, and those who had regained their amateur status, a chance to play against each other for a national title.

== Field ==
While most players at the U.S. Amateur advance through sectional qualifying, many players are exempt each year. Below are the exemptions:

1. Winners of the U.S. Amateur each of the last ten years.
2. Runner-up of the U.S. Amateur each of the last three years.
3. Semi-finalists of the U.S. Amateur each of the last two years.
4. Quarter-finalists of the U.S. Amateur the previous year.
5. Any amateur who qualified for the current year's U.S. Open.
6. Those amateurs returning 72 hole scores from the previous year's U.S. Open.
7. The amateur with the lowest score from the current year's U.S. Senior Open.
8. From the U.S. Mid-Amateur: winner each of the last two years and runner-up from the previous year.
9. From the U.S. Junior Amateur: winner each of the last two years and runner-up from the previous year.
10. From the U.S. Senior Amateur: winner each of the last two years and runner-up from the previous year.
11. Playing members of the two most recent Walker Cup teams.
12. Playing members of the two most recent U.S. Eisenhower Trophy teams.
13. Playing members of the current year's U.S. Men's Copa de las Américas team.
14. Winner of the current year's individual NCAA Division I Championship.
15. Winner of the British Amateur Championship each of the last five years.
16. Top hundred golfers in World Amateur Golf Ranking.
17. Winner of the current year Latin America Amateur Championship.

In all cases, the exemptions only apply if the player has not turned professional as of the tournament date.

== Winners ==
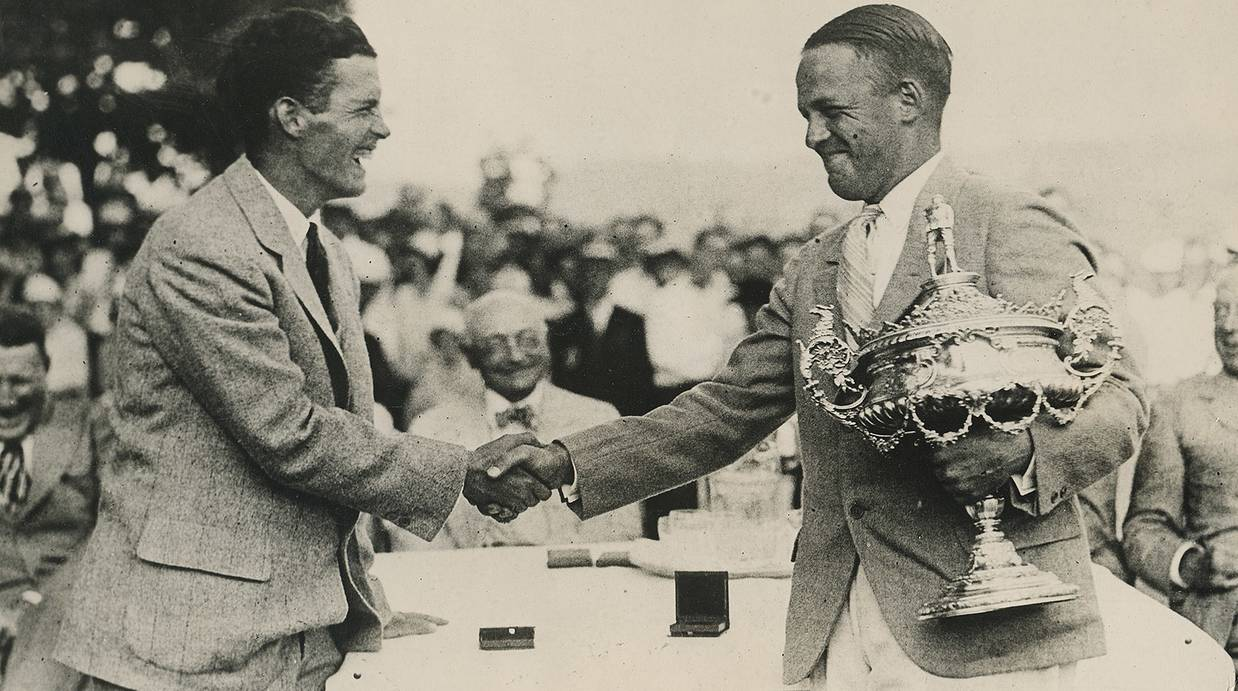
Watts Gunn (left) with Bobby Jones (holding trophy) at the 1925 U.S. Amateur, which Jones won.

| Year | Winner | Score | Runner-up | Primary course | Stroke play co-host |
|---|---|---|---|---|---|
| 2026 | (England) Jack Whaley | 4 & 3 | (United States) Jay Leng Jr | Merion Golf Club | Philadelphia Country Club |
| 2025 | (United States) Mason Howell | 7 & 6 | (United States) Jackson Herrington | Olympic Club (Lake Course) | Olympic Club (Ocean Course) |
| 2024 | (Spain) José Luis Ballester | 2 up | (United States) Noah Kent | Hazeltine National Golf Club | Chaska Town Course |
| 2023 | (United States) Nick Dunlap | 4 & 3 | (United States) Neal Shipley | Cherry Hills Country Club | Colorado Golf Club |
| 2022 | (United States) Sam Bennett | 1 up | (United States) Ben Carr | Ridgewood Country Club | Arcola Country Club |
| 2021 | (United States) James Piot | 2 & 1 | (United States) Austin Greaser | Oakmont Country Club | Longue Vue Club |
| 2020 | (United States) Tyler Strafaci | 1 up | (United States) Ollie Osborne | Bandon Dunes Golf Resort (Bandon Dunes) | Bandon Dunes Golf Resort (Bandon Trails) |
| 2019 | (United States) Andy Ogletree | 2 & 1 | (United States) John Augenstein | Pinehurst Resort (No. 2) | Pinehurst Resort (No. 4) |
| 2018 | (Norway) Viktor Hovland | 6 & 5 | (United States) Devon Bling | Pebble Beach Golf Links | Spyglass Hill Golf Course |
| 2017 | (United States) Doc Redman | 37th hole | (United States) Doug Ghim | Riviera Country Club | Bel-Air Country Club |
| 2016 | (Australia) Curtis Luck | 6 & 4 | (United States) Brad Dalke | Oakland Hills Country Club (South Course) | Oakland Hills Country Club (North Course) |
| 2015 | (United States) Bryson DeChambeau | 7 & 6 | (United States) Derek Bard | Olympia Fields Country Club (North Course) | Olympia Fields Country Club (South Course) |
| 2014 | (South Korea) Gunn Yang | 2 & 1 | (Canada) Corey Conners | Atlanta Athletic Club (Highlands Course) | Atlanta Athletic Club (Riverside Course) |
| 2013 | (England) Matt Fitzpatrick | 4 & 3 | (Australia) Oliver Goss | The Country Club | Charles River Country Club |
| 2012 | (United States) Steven Fox | 37th hole | (United States) Michael Weaver | Cherry Hills Country Club | CommonGround Golf Course |
| 2011 | (United States) Kelly Kraft | 2 up | (United States) Patrick Cantlay | Erin Hills | Blue Mound Golf & Country Club |
| 2010 | (United States) Peter Uihlein | 4 & 2 | (United States) David Chung | Chambers Bay | The Home Course |
| 2009 | (South Korea) An Byeong-hun | 7 & 5 | (United States) Ben Martin | Southern Hills Country Club | Cedar Ridge Country Club |
| 2008 | (New Zealand) Danny Lee | 5 & 4 | (United States) Drew Kittleson | Pinehurst Resort (No. 2) | Pinehurst Resort (No. 4) |
| 2007 | (United States) Colt Knost | 2 & 1 | (United States) Michael Thompson | Olympic Club (Lake Course) | Olympic Club (Ocean Course) |
| 2006 | (Scotland) Richie Ramsay | 4 & 2 | (United States) John Kelly | Hazeltine National Golf Club | Chaska Town Course |
| 2005 | (Italy) Edoardo Molinari | 4 & 3 | (United States) Dillon Dougherty | Merion Golf Club | Philadelphia Country Club |
| 2004 | (United States) Ryan Moore | 2 up | (United States) Luke List | Winged Foot Golf Club (West Course) | Winged Foot Golf Club (East Course) |
| 2003 | (Australia) Nick Flanagan | 37th hole | (United States) Casey Wittenberg | Oakmont Country Club | Pittsburgh Field Club |
| 2002 | (United States) Ricky Barnes | 2 & 1 | (United States) Hunter Mahan | Oakland Hills Country Club (South Course) | Oakland Hills Country Club (North Course) |
| 2001 | (United States) Bubba Dickerson | 1 up | (United States) Robert Hamilton | East Lake Golf Club | Druid Hills Golf Club |
| 2000 | (United States) Jeff Quinney | 39th hole | (United States) James Driscoll | Baltusrol Golf Club (Upper Course) | Baltusrol Golf Club (Lower Course) |
| 1999 | (United States) David Gossett | 9 & 8 | (South Korea) Kim Sung-yoon | Pebble Beach Golf Links | Spyglass Hill Golf Course |
| 1998 | (United States) Hank Kuehne | 2 & 1 | (United States) Tom McKnight | Oak Hill Country Club (East Course) | Oak Hill Country Club (West Course) |
| 1997 | (United States) Matt Kuchar | 2 & 1 | (United States) Joel Kribel | Cog Hill Golf & Country Club (No. 4) | Cog Hill Golf & Country Club (No. 2) |
| 1996 | (United States) Tiger Woods (3) | 38th hole | (United States) Steve Scott | Pumpkin Ridge Golf Club (Witch Hollow Course) | Pumpkin Ridge Golf Club (Ghost Creek Course) |
| 1995 | (United States) Tiger Woods (2) | 2 up | (United States) Buddy Marucci | Newport Country Club | Wanumetonomy Golf and Country Club |
| 1994 | (United States) Tiger Woods | 2 up | (United States) Trip Kuehne | TPC at Sawgrass (Stadium Course) | TPC at Sawgrass (Valley Course) |
| 1993 | (United States) John Harris | 5 & 3 | (United States) Danny Ellis | Champions Golf Club (Cypress Creek Course) | Champions Golf Club (Jackrabbit Course) |
| 1992 | (United States) Justin Leonard | 8 & 7 | (United States) Tom Scherrer | Muirfield Village | The Country Club at Muirfield Village |
| 1991 | (United States) Mitch Voges | 7 & 6 | (South Africa) Manny Zerman | Honors Course | Cleveland Country Club |
| 1990 | (United States) Phil Mickelson | 5 & 4 | (South Africa) Manny Zerman | Cherry Hills Country Club | Meridian Golf Club |
| 1989 | (United States) Chris Patton | 3 & 1 | (United States) Danny Green | Merion Golf Club | Waynesborough Country Club |
| 1988 | (United States) Eric Meeks | 7 & 6 | (United States) Danny Yates | The Homestead (Cascades Course) | The Homestead (Lower Cascades Course) |
| 1987 | (United States) Billy Mayfair | 4 & 3 | (United States) Eric Rebmann | Jupiter Hills Club (Hills Course) | Jupiter Hills Club (Village Course) |
| 1986 | (United States) Buddy Alexander | 5 & 3 | (United States) Chris Kite | Shoal Creek Golf and Country Club | Country Club of Birmingham |
| 1985 | (United States) Sam Randolph | 1 up | (United States) Peter Persons | Montclair Golf Club (fourth and second nines) | Montclair Golf Club (first and third nines) |
| 1984 | (United States) Scott Verplank | 4 & 3 | (United States) Sam Randolph | Oak Tree Golf Club | Oak Tree Country Club |
| 1983 | (United States) Jay Sigel (2) | 8 & 7 | (United States) Chris Perry | North Shore Country Club | Skokie Country Club |
| 1982 | (United States) Jay Sigel | 8 & 7 | (United States) David Tolley | The Country Club | Charles River Country Club |
| 1981 | (United States) Nathaniel Crosby | 1 up | (United States) Brian Lindley | Olympic Club (Lake Course) | Olympic Club (Ocean Course) |
| 1980 | (United States) Hal Sutton | 9 & 8 | (United States) Bob Lewis | The Country Club of North Carolina | Pinehurst Resort (No. 2) |
| 1979 | (United States) Mark O'Meara | 8 & 7 | (United States) John Cook | Canterbury Golf Club | Shaker Heights Country Club |
| 1978 | (United States) John Cook | 5 & 4 | (United States) Scott Hoch | Plainfield Country Club | n/a |
| 1977 | (United States) John Fought | 9 & 8 | (United States) Doug Fischesser | Aronimink Golf Club | n/a |
| 1976 | (United States) Bill Sander | 8 & 6 | (United States) Cary Parker Moore Jr. | Bel-Air Country Club | n/a |
| 1975 | (United States) Fred Ridley | 2 up | (United States) Keith Fergus | Country Club of Virginia | n/a |
| 1974 | (United States) Jerry Pate | 2 & 1 | (United States) John Grace | Ridgewood Country Club | n/a |
| 1973 | (United States) Craig Stadler | 6 & 5 | (United States) David Strawn | Inverness Club | n/a |
1965–1972: Stroke play
| 1972 | (United States) Vinny Giles | 285 | (United States) Mark Hayes, (United States) Ben Crenshaw | Charlotte Country Club | n/a |
| 1971 | (Canada) Gary Cowan (2) | 280 | (United States) Eddie Pearce | Wilmington Country Club | n/a |
| 1970 | (United States) Lanny Wadkins | 279 | (United States) Tom Kite | Waverley Country Club | n/a |
| 1969 | (United States) Steve Melnyk | 286 | (United States) Vinny Giles | Oakmont Country Club | n/a |
| 1968 | (United States) Bruce Fleisher | 284 | (United States) Vinny Giles | Scioto Country Club | n/a |
| 1967 | (United States) Bob Dickson | 285 | (United States) Vinny Giles | Broadmoor Golf Club | n/a |
| 1966 | (Canada) Gary Cowan | 285 | (United States) Deane Beman | Merion Golf Club | n/a |
| 1965 | (United States) Bob Murphy | 291 | (United States) Bob Dickson | Southern Hills Country Club | n/a |
1895–1964: Match play
| 1964 | (United States) William C. Campbell | 1 up | (United States) Ed Tutwiler | Canterbury Golf Club | n/a |
| 1963 | (United States) Deane Beman (2) | 2 & 1 | (United States) R. H. Sikes | Wakonda Club | n/a |
| 1962 | (United States) Labron Harris Jr. | 1 up | (United States) Downing Gray | Pinehurst Resort | n/a |
| 1961 | (United States) Jack Nicklaus (2) | 8 & 6 | (United States) Dudley Wysong | Pebble Beach Golf Links | n/a |
| 1960 | (United States) Deane Beman | 6 & 4 | (United States) Robert W. Gardner | St. Louis Country Club | n/a |
| 1959 | (United States) Jack Nicklaus | 1 up | (United States) Charles Coe | Broadmoor Golf Club | n/a |
| 1958 | (United States) Charles Coe (2) | 5 & 4 | (United States) Tommy Aaron | Olympic Club | n/a |
| 1957 | (United States) Hillman Robbins | 5 & 4 | (United States) Bud Taylor | The Country Club | n/a |
| 1956 | (United States) Harvie Ward (2) | 5 & 4 | (United States) Chuck Kocsis | Knollwood Club | n/a |
| 1955 | (United States) Harvie Ward | 9 & 8 | (United States) Bill Hyndman | Country Club of Virginia | n/a |
| 1954 | (United States) Arnold Palmer | 1 up | (United States) Robert Sweeny Jr. | Country Club of Detroit | n/a |
| 1953 | (United States) Gene Littler | 1 up | (United States) Dale Morey | Oklahoma City Golf & Country Club | n/a |
| 1952 | (United States) Jack Westland | 3 & 2 | (United States) Al Mengert | Seattle Golf Club | n/a |
| 1951 | (United States) Billy Maxwell | 4 & 3 | (United States) Joe Gagliardi | Saucon Valley Country Club | n/a |
| 1950 | (United States) Sam Urzetta | 39th hole | (United States) Frank Stranahan | Minneapolis Golf Club | n/a |
| 1949 | (United States) Charles Coe | 11 & 10 | (United States) Rufus King | Oak Hill Country Club | n/a |
| 1948 | (United States) Willie Turnesa (2) | 2 & 1 | (United States) Ray Billows | Memphis Country Club | n/a |
| 1947 | (United States) Skee Riegel | 2 & 1 | (United States) Johnny Dawson | Pebble Beach Golf Links | n/a |
| 1946 | (United States) Ted Bishop | 37th hole | (United States) Smiley Quick | Baltusrol Golf Club | n/a |
| 1942–1945: No championships due to World War II | | | | | n/a |
| 1941 | (United States) Bud Ward (2) | 4 & 3 | (United States) Pat Abbott | Omaha Field Club | n/a |
| 1940 | (United States) Dick Chapman | 11 & 9 | (United States) Duff McCullough | Winged Foot Golf Club | n/a |
| 1939 | (United States) Bud Ward | 7 & 5 | (United States) Ray Billows | North Shore Country Club | n/a |
| 1938 | (United States) Willie Turnesa | 8 & 7 | (United States) Pat Abbott | Oakmont Country Club | n/a |
| 1937 | (United States) Johnny Goodman | 2 up | (United States) Ray Billows | Alderwood Country Club | n/a |
| 1936 | (United States) Johnny Fischer | 37th hole | (Scotland) Jack McLean | Garden City Golf Club | n/a |
| 1935 | (United States) Lawson Little (2) | 4 & 2 | (United States) Walter Emery | The Country Club | n/a |
| 1934 | (United States) Lawson Little | 8 & 7 | (United States) David Goldman | The Country Club | n/a |
| 1933 | (United States) George Dunlap | 6 & 5 | (United States) Max Marston | Kenwood Country Club | n/a |
| 1932 | (Canada) Ross Somerville | 2 & 1 | (United States) Johnny Goodman | Baltimore Country Club | n/a |
| 1931 | (United States) Francis Ouimet (2) | 6 & 5 | (United States) Jack Westland | Beverly Country Club | n/a |
| 1930 | (United States) Bobby Jones (5) | 8 & 7 | (United States) Eugene V. Homans | Merion Golf Club | n/a |
| 1929 | (United States) Jimmy Johnston | 4 & 3 | (United States) Oscar Willing | Pebble Beach Golf Links | n/a |
| 1928 | (United States) Bobby Jones (4) | 10 & 9 | (England) Philip Perkins | Brae Burn Country Club | n/a |
| 1927 | (United States) Bobby Jones (3) | 8 & 7 | (United States) Chick Evans | Minikahda Club | n/a |
| 1926 | (United States) George Von Elm | 2 & 1 | (United States) Bobby Jones | Baltusrol Golf Club | n/a |
| 1925 | (United States) Bobby Jones (2) | 8 & 7 | (United States) Watts Gunn | Oakmont Country Club | n/a |
| 1924 | (United States) Bobby Jones | 9 & 8 | (United States) George Von Elm | Merion Golf Club | n/a |
| 1923 | (United States) Max Marston | 38th hole | (United States) Jess Sweetser | Flossmoor Country Club | n/a |
| 1922 | (United States) Jess Sweetser | 3 & 2 | (United States) Chick Evans | The Country Club | n/a |
| 1921 | (United States) Jesse Guilford | 7 & 6 | (United States) Robert Gardner | St. Louis Country Club | n/a |
| 1920 | (United States) Chick Evans (2) | 7 & 6 | (United States) Francis Ouimet | Engineers Country Club | n/a |
| 1919 | (United States) Davidson Herron | 5 & 4 | (United States) Bobby Jones | Oakmont Country Club | n/a |
1917–1918: No championships due to World War I
| 1916 | (United States) Chick Evans | 4 & 3 | (United States) Robert Gardner | Merion Golf Club | n/a |
| 1915 | (United States) Robert Gardner (2) | 5 & 4 | (United States) John G. Anderson | Country Club of Detroit | n/a |
| 1914 | (United States) Francis Ouimet | 6 & 5 | (United States) Jerome Travers | Ekwanok Country Club | n/a |
| 1913 | (United States) Jerome Travers (4) | 5 & 4 | (United States) John G. Anderson | Garden City Golf Club | n/a |
| 1912 | (United States) Jerome Travers (3) | 7 & 6 | (United States) Chick Evans | Chicago Golf Club | n/a |
| 1911 | (England) Harold Hilton | 37th hole | (United States) Fred Herreshoff | The Apawamis Club | n/a |
| 1910 | (United States) William C. Fownes Jr. | 4 & 3 | (United States) Warren Wood | The Country Club | n/a |
| 1909 | (United States) Robert Gardner | 4 & 3 | (United States) Chandler Egan | Chicago Golf Club | n/a |
| 1908 | (United States) Jerome Travers (2) | 8 & 7 | (United States) Max H. Behr | Garden City Golf Club | n/a |
| 1907 | (United States) Jerome Travers | 6 & 5 | (United States) Archibald Graham | Euclid Club | n/a |
| 1906 | (United States) Eben Byers | 2 up | (Canada) George Lyon | Englewood Golf Club | n/a |
| 1905 | (United States) Chandler Egan (2) | 6 & 5 | (United States) Daniel Sawyer | Chicago Golf Club | n/a |
| 1904 | (United States) Chandler Egan | 8 & 6 | (United States) Fred Herreshoff | Baltusrol Golf Club | n/a |
| 1903 | (United States) Walter Travis (3) | 5 & 4 | (United States) Eben Byers | Nassau Country Club | n/a |
| 1902 | (United States) Louis N. James | 4 & 2 | (United States) Eben Byers | Glen View Club | n/a |
| 1901 | (United States) Walter Travis (2) | 5 & 4 | (United States) Walter Egan | Atlantic City Country Club | n/a |
| 1900 | (United States) Walter Travis | 2 up | (Scotland) Findlay S. Douglas | Garden City Golf Club | n/a |
| 1899 | (United States) Herbert M. Harriman | 3 & 2 | (Scotland) Findlay S. Douglas | Onwentsia Club | n/a |
| 1898 | (Scotland) Findlay S. Douglas | 5 & 3 | (United States) Walter B. Smith | Morris County Golf Club | n/a |
| 1897 | (Scotland) H. J. Whigham (2) | 8 & 6 | (United States) W. Rossiter Betts | Chicago Golf Club | n/a |
| 1896 | (Scotland) H. J. Whigham | 8 & 7 | (United States) Joseph G. Thorp | Shinnecock Hills Golf Club | n/a |
| 1895 | (United States) Charles B. Macdonald | 12 & 11 | (United States) Charles Sands | Newport Country Club | n/a |

== Multiple winners ==
Twelve players have won both the U.S. Amateur and U.S. Open Championships, through 2024:

- Jerome Travers: 1907, 1908, 1912, 1913 Amateurs; 1915 Open
- Francis Ouimet: 1914, 1931 Amateurs; 1913 Open
- Chick Evans:^ 1916, 1920 Amateurs; 1916 Open
- Bobby Jones:^ 1924, 1925, 1927, 1928, 1930 Amateurs; 1923, 1926, 1929, 1930 Opens
- Lawson Little: 1934, 1935 Amateurs; 1940 Open
- Johnny Goodman: 1937 Amateur; 1933 Open
- Gene Littler: 1953 Amateur; 1961 Open
- Arnold Palmer: 1954 Amateur; 1960 Open
- Jack Nicklaus: 1959, 1961 Amateurs; 1962, 1967, 1972, 1980 Opens
- Jerry Pate: 1974 Amateur; 1976 Open
- Tiger Woods: 1994, 1995, 1996 Amateurs; 2000, 2002, 2008 Opens
- Bryson DeChambeau: 2015 Amateur; 2020, 2024 Opens
- Matt Fitzpatrick: 2013 Amateur; 2022 Open

Thirteen players have won both the U.S. Amateur and British Amateurs, through 2024:

- Walter Travis: 1900, 1901, 1903 U.S.; 1904 British
- Harold Hilton:^ 1911 U.S.; 1900, 1901, 1911, 1913 British
- Jess Sweetser: 1922 U.S.; 1926 British
- Bobby Jones:^ 1924, 1925, 1927, 1928, 1930 U.S.; 1930 British
- Lawson Little:^ 1934, 1935 U.S.; 1934, 1935 British
- Willie Turnesa: 1938, 1948 U.S.; 1947 British
- Dick Chapman: 1940 U.S.; 1951 British
- Harvie Ward: 1955, 1956 U.S.; 1952 British
- Deane Beman: 1960, 1963 U.S.; 1959 British
- Bob Dickson:^ 1967 U.S.; 1967 British
- Steve Melnyk: 1969 U.S.; 1971 British
- Vinny Giles: 1972 U.S.; 1975 British
- Jay Sigel: 1982, 1983 U.S.; 1979 British

Two players have won both the U.S. Amateur and U.S. Junior Amateur through 2024:

- Tiger Woods: 1994, 1995, 1996 Amateurs; 1991, 1992, 1993 Junior Amateur
- Nick Dunlap: 2023 Amateur; 2021 Junior Amateur

Two players have won both the U.S. Amateur and U.S. Amateur Public Links in the same year:

- Ryan Moore: 2004
- Colt Knost: 2007

^ Won both in same year. Bobby Jones won the Grand Slam in 1930, winning the U.S. Amateur, U.S. Open, British Amateur, and British Open.

== Most times hosted ==
- Seven
  - Merion Golf Club (1916, 1924, 1930, 1966, 1989, 2005, 2026)
- Six
  - The Country Club (1910, 1922, 1934, 1957, 1982, 2013)
  - Oakmont Country Club (1919, 1925, 1938, 1969, 2003, 2021)
- Five
  - Pebble Beach Golf Links (1929, 1947, 1961, 1999, 2018)
- Four
  - Chicago Golf Club (1897, 1905, 1909, 1912)
  - Garden City Golf Club (1900, 1908, 1913, 1936)
  - Baltusrol Golf Club (1904, 1926, 1946, 2000)
  - Olympic Club (1958, 1981, 2007, 2025)

== Future sites ==
| Year | Edition | Course | Location | Dates | Previous championships hosted |
|---|---|---|---|---|---|
| 2027 | 127th | Oak Hill Country Club | Pittsford, New York | August 9–15 | 1949, 1998 |
| 2028 | 128th | Whistling Straits | Kohler, Wisconsin | August 14–20 | |
| 2029 | 129th | Inverness Club | Toledo, Ohio | August 13–19 | 1973 |
| 2030 | 130th | Atlanta Athletic Club | Johns Creek, Georgia | August 12–18 | 2014 |
| 2031 | 131st | Honors Course | Ooltewah, Tennessee | August 11–17 | 1991 |
| 2032 | 132nd | Bandon Dunes Golf Resort | Bandon, Oregon | August 9–15 | 2020 |
| 2033 | 133rd | Chambers Bay | University Place, Washington | August 15–21 | 2010 |
| 2034 | 134th | The Country Club | Brookline, Massachusetts | August 14–20 | 1910, 1922, 1934, 1957, 1982, 2013 |
| 2035 | 135th | Erin Hills | Erin, Wisconsin | August 13–19 | 2011 |
| 2036 | 136th | Scioto Country Club | Upper Arlington, Ohio | August 11–17 | 1968 |
| 2038 | 138th | Pinehurst Resort | Pinehurst, North Carolina | TBD | 1962, 2008, 2019 |
| 2039 | 139th | Baltusrol Golf Club | Springfield, New Jersey | TBD | 1904, 1926, 1946, 2000 |
| 2041 | 141st | Bandon Dunes Golf Resort | Bandon, Oregon | TBD | 2020, 2032 |
| 2042 | 142nd | Ridgewood Country Club | Paramus, New Jersey | TBD | 1974, 2022 |
| 2044 | 144th | Southern Hills Country Club | Tulsa, Oklahoma | TBD | 1965, 2009 |
| 2047 | 147th | Oakland Hills Country Club | Bloomfield Hills, Michigan | TBD | 2002, 2016 |
| 2051 | 151st | Saucon Valley Country Club | Bethlehem, Pennsylvania | TBD | 1951 |

== Exemptions ==
The U.S. Amateur results lead to exemptions into other tournaments. Except for the U.S. Open exemption for the winner, the exemption holds only if the golfer retains their amateur status. All the exemptions listed below pertain to only the winner of the U.S. Amateur, unless otherwise stated.

Here are the major exemptions:

- The next 10 years of the U.S. Amateur
- The next 3 years of the U.S. Amateur (runner-up)
- The next 2 years of the U.S. Amateur (semi-finalists)
- The following year's U.S. Amateur (quarter-finalists)
- The following year's U.S. Open (winner and runner-up) (winner is permitted to turn professional before the tournament)
- The following year's Masters Tournament (winner and runner-up)
- The following year's Open Championship
- The next 10 years of the Amateur Championship

Here are the other exemptions:

- The following year's Monroe Invitational (top 8 + top 20 stroke portion)
- The following year's Northeast Amateur (top 8)
