= Jerome Travers =

American amateur golfer

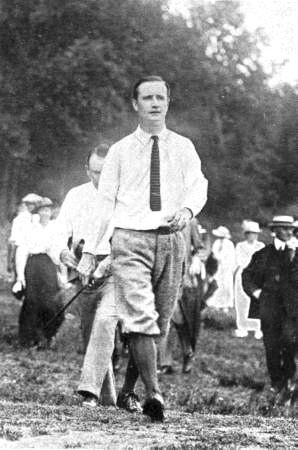
- Travers playing in the 1915 U.S. Open

Personal information
- Full name: Jerome Dunstan Travers
- Nickname: Jerry
- Nationality: United States
- Born: May 19, 1887 New York City, New York, U.S.
- Died: March 29, 1951 (aged 63) East Hartford, Connecticut, U.S.

Career
- Sport: Golf
- Status: Professional
- Professional wins: 1

Best results in major championships (wins: 5)
- Masters Tournament: DNP
- PGA Championship: DNP
- U.S. Open: Won: 1915
- The Open Championship: DNP
- U.S. Amateur: Won: 1907, 1908, 1912, 1913
- British Amateur: T129: 1909, 1914

Achievements and awards
- World Golf Hall of Fame: 1976 (member page)

Jerome Dunstan "Jerry" Travers (May 19, 1887 – March 29, 1951) was one of the leading amateur golfers of the early 1900s. He won the U.S. Amateur in 1907, 1908, 1912 and 1913, the New Jersey Amateur three times, and the Metropolitan Amateur (New York) five times. He was regarded as one of the finest match play golfers of his time and had a famous rivalry with Walter Travis. He won the 1915 U.S. Open.

== Early life ==
Travers was born on May 19, 1887, in New York City, New York.

== Golf career ==
On September 16, 1905, a then 18-year-old Travers partnered with Herbert Strong to tie for second place, shooting 72, in a four-ball tournament held at Fox Hills Golf Club on Staten Island as part of the 1905 Metropolitan Open. The stroke play portion of the tournament was won by Alex Smith.

In 1915 Travers won the U.S. Open at Baltusrol Golf Club, making him the second of the five amateurs to win the event. It was his only top ten finish in four appearances at the U.S. Open – he never entered the tournament again once he had won it.

Although all of Travers' notable victories came as an amateur, he later became a teaching professional and gave exhibitions.

== Death and legacy ==
Travers died on March 29, 1951, in East Hartford, Connecticut.

== Awards and honors ==
In 1976, Travers was inducted into the World Golf Hall of Fame

== Tournament wins ==
- 1904 Nassau Invitational
- 1906 Metropolitan Amateur, Eastern Scholastic, Lynnewood Hall Cup
- 1907 **U.S. Amateur**, Metropolitan Amateur, New Jersey Amateur
- 1908 **U.S. Amateur**, New Jersey Amateur, Morris County Invitation Tournament, Lynnewood Hall Cup
- 1910 Montclair G.C. Invitational
- 1911 Metropolitan Amateur, New Jersey Amateur
- 1912 **U.S. Amateur**, Metropolitan Amateur
- 1913 **U.S. Amateur**, Metropolitan Amateur, New Jersey Amateur
- 1914 Prince of Wales Medal
- 1915 **U.S. Open**, Lynnewood Hall Cup

Note: Major championships in bold

== Major championships ==
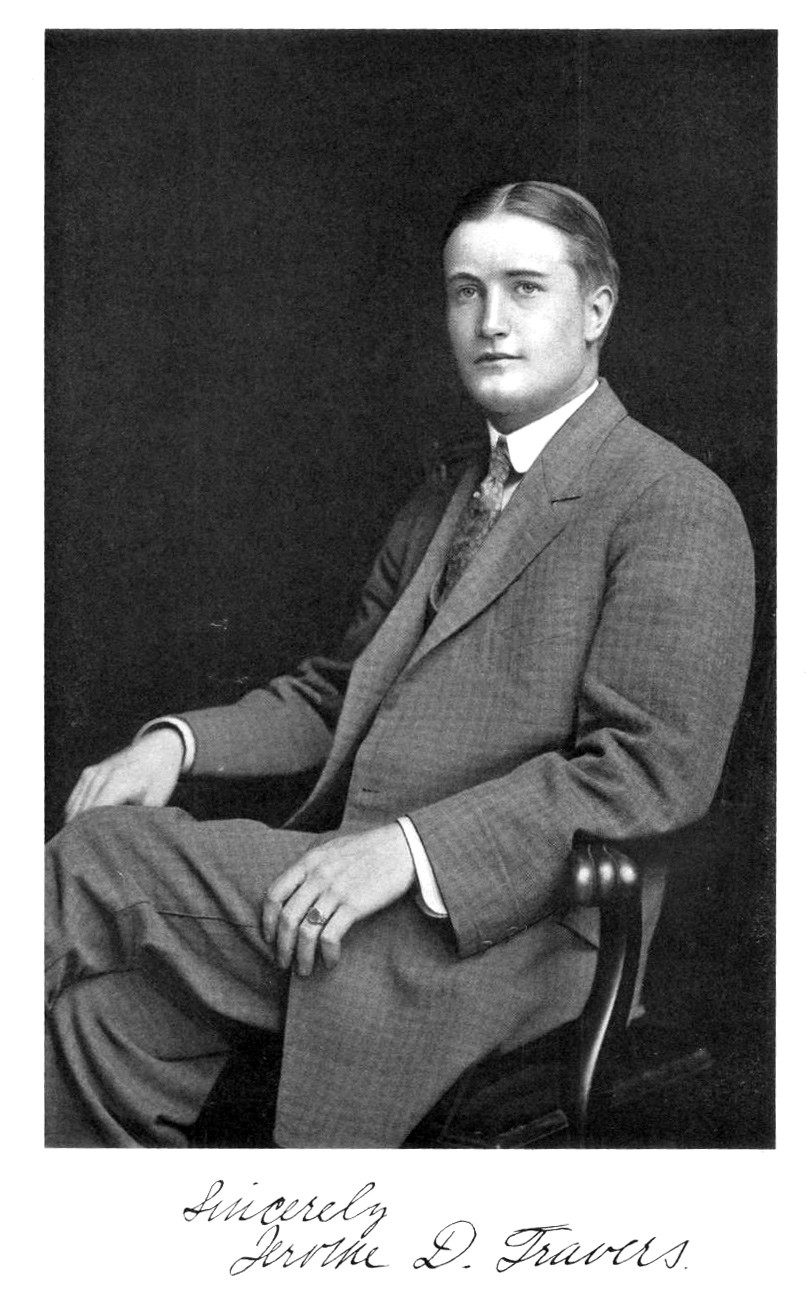
Jerome Travers

=== Professional wins (1) ===
Year	Championship	54 holes	Winning score	Margin	Runner-up
1915	U.S. Open	1 shot lead	+1 (76-72-73-76=297)	1 stroke	(United States) Tom McNamara

=== Amateur wins (4) ===
Year	Championship	Winning score	Runner-up
1907	U.S. Amateur	6 & 5	(United States) Archibald Graham
1908	U.S. Amateur	8 & 7	(United States) Max H. Behr
1912	U.S. Amateur	7 & 6	(United States) Chick Evans
1913	U.S. Amateur	5 & 4	(United States) John G. Anderson

=== Results timeline ===
Tournament	1903	1904	1905	1906	1907	1908	1909
U.S. Open					T25		CUT
U.S. Amateur	R64	R32	R32	QF	**1**	**1**	
The Amateur Championship							R256

Tournament	1910	1911	1912	1913	1914	1915	1916	1917	1918	1919
U.S. Open				T27		**1**		NT	NT	
U.S. Amateur		QF	**1**	**1**	2	R16		NT	NT	R32
The Amateur Championship					R256	NT	NT	NT	NT	NT

Note: Travers played in only the U.S. Open, U.S. Amateur, and The Amateur Championship.

Win
Top 10
Did not play

NT = no tournament
"T" indicates a tie for a place
R256, R128, R64, R32, R16, QF, SF = round in which player lost in match play

Sources: U.S. Open and U.S. Amateur, Amateur Championship: 1909, 1914
