= Paul M. Hunter =

American professional golfer

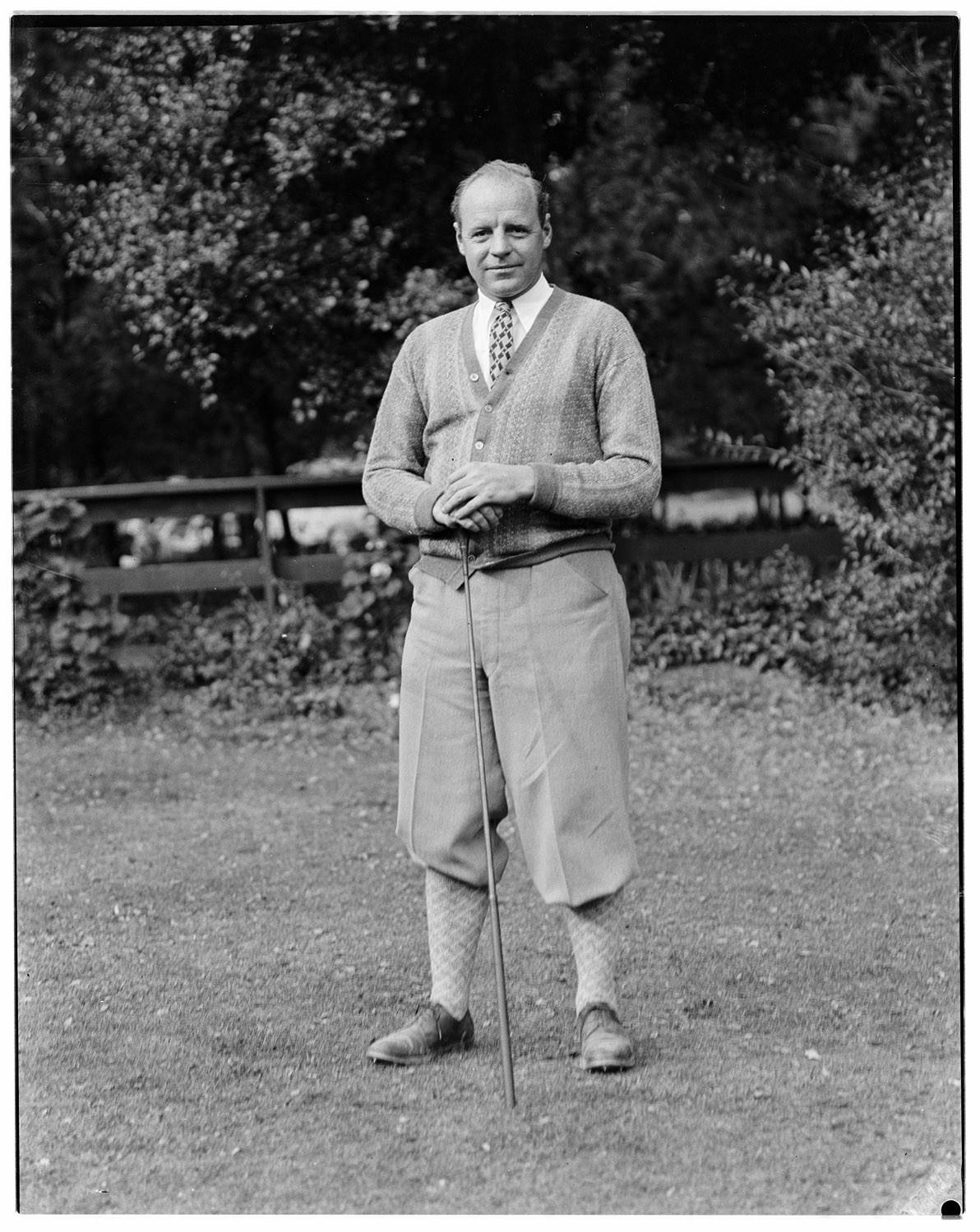
- Hunter in 1928

Personal information
- Full name: Paul Mallers Hunter
- Born: October 28, 1890 Illinois, US
- Died: April 28, 1944 (aged 53) Los Angeles, California, US
- Spouse: Elizabeth Hixon
- Children: 3

Career
- Sport: Golf
- College: University of Chicago
- Status: Amateur
- U.S. Amateur: T5: 1920, 1921

Achievements and awards
- Won: California State Amateur Championship: 1920, 1921
- Won: SCGA Amateur champion: 1908, 1909, 1921, 1924, 1926

Paul Mallers Hunter (October 28, 1890 – April 28, 1944) was an American amateur golfer. He was the only five-time Southern California Championship Golf Amateur (SCGA) champion (1908, 1909, 1921, 1924 and 1926), and won the California State Amateur Championship in 1920 and 1921.

== Early life ==
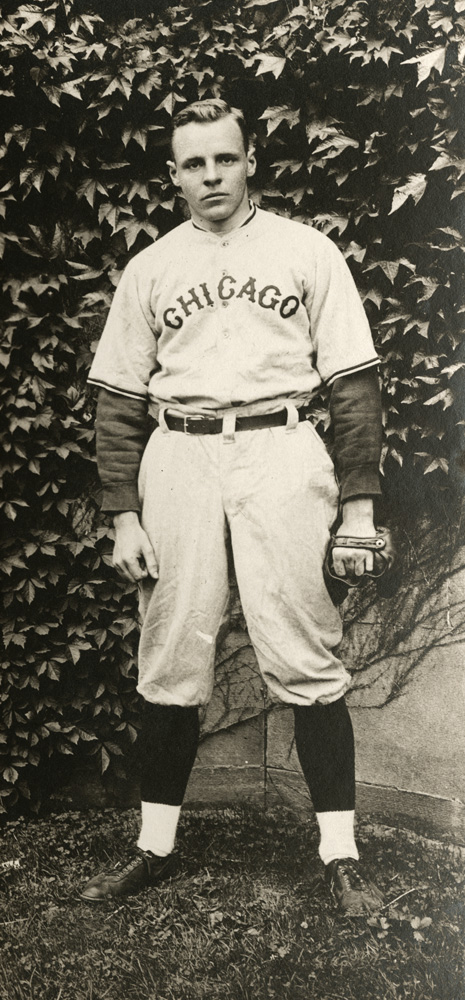
Paul M. Hunter at University of Chicago (1912).

Hunter was born on October 28, 1890, in Illinois, the son of Charles Legrand Hunter and Ida Malles. He was a student at the University of Chicago, a member of the baseball and golf teams, and was a golf team captain. At age 14, Hunter moved from Chicago to California in 1904. At the outbreak of World War I, Hunter enlisted as an officer in the United States Army Medical Corps.

In the 1930s, Hunter practiced medicine in Monterey and Carmel-by-the-Sea. He had a home in Pebble Beach, California and a ranch in Carmel Valley.

== Golf career ==
Hunter was president of Western Research Laboratories and president of the California Golf Association.

Hunter won the California State Amateur Championship in 1920 and 1921. He won the state amateur championship on September 12, 1920, defeating Erwin S. Armstrong 6 to 4. In September 1921, Hunter won the state amateur championship tournament for the second time against C. H. Walter of Oakland. Both years the matches were played on the 19-hole Pebble Beach Golf Links.

Hunter travelled to Europe in 1921. In May, he played for an American team in an international match that was held at Royal Liverpool before the start of the Amateur Championship the following week. The American team won the match 9–3, Hunter winning his foursomes match but losing to Colin Aylmer in the singles. In the Amateur Championship, Hunter reached the fifth round, the last-16 stage, before losing to Bernard Darwin. The following month, Hunter played in the Open Championship held June 23–25 at the Old Course in St Andrews, Scotland. In the qualifying, he started with an 80 on the Eden course but qualified comfortably after a second round of 73 on the Old course. In the championship itself he started with a 75 and eventually finished in a tie for 19th place, the second best amateur behind Roger Wethered.

He won the Southern California Championship five times (1908, 1909, 1921, 1924 and 1926). In the 1909 amateur golf championship of Southern California, Hunter, age 19, won the title against N. F. Wilshire. At this time he won for the second time and his name was inscribed on the silver trophy cup. He went on to win the Southern California Amateur title in April 1926, for the fifth time by defeating R. G. Cawsey of the California club.

=== Team appearances ===
- Great Britain vs USA (representing the American team): 1921

== Death and legacy ==
Hunter died of a heart attack on April 28, 1944, at the Huntington Memorial Hospital in Pasadena. Funeral services were held at the Hunter residence and he was buried at the San Gabriel cemetery in San Gabriel, California.

== See also ==
- The Open Championship
