= Wethered =

Wethered is a surname, and may refer to:

- John Wethered (1809–1888), American politician
- Joyce Wethered (1901–1997), English golfer
- Newton Wethered (1870–1957), English writer, father of Roger and Joyce Wethered
- Roger Wethered (1899–1983), English golfer, brother of Joyce Wethered
- Thomas Owen Wethered (1832–1921), English brewer and politician
