= Orme Bristowe =

English sportsman

Personal information
- Full name: Orme Cheshyre Bristowe
- Born: 12 April 1895; Watford, Hertfordshire, England
- Died: 27 December 1938 (aged 43); Freiston Shore, Lincolnshire, England
- Batting: Right-handed
- Role: Bowler

Domestic team information
- Years: Team
- 1913–1914: Essex

Career statistics
Competition	FC
Matches	21
Runs scored	567
Batting average	18.29
100s/50s
Top score	81
Balls bowled
Wickets	74
Bowling average	23.66
5 wickets in innings	4
10 wickets in match	0
Best bowling	6/81
Catches/stumpings	6/0
- Source: Cricinfo, 22 July 2013

Orme Cheshyre Bristowe (12 April 1895 – 27 December 1938) was an English cricketer and golfer. As a cricketer he played for Essex between 1913 and 1914 and won a Blue for cricket at Oxford University as a freshman in 1914.

Orme also got his Blue for golf in 1914, winning his match 4&3 in a close 5–4 victory for Oxford. After World War I Orme concentrated on golf and was a reserve for the 1923 Walker Cup. In January 1924 he beat Ernest Holderness in the President's Putter. This was the first defeat of Holderness in the event which he had won in the previous four years. Bristowe reached the final but lost to Bernard Darwin. In 1924 he was in the Walker Cup team at Garden City Golf Club, Garden City, New York. Playing with Tony Torrance he lost his foursomes match 4&3 and was not selected for the singles matches on the second day. Heart problems later limited his playing opportunities and he died while out shooting in Norfolk, aged 43. He was a member of the Stock Exchange.
