= Golf Illustrated Gold Vase =

Amateur golf tournament in England

Tournament information
- Location: England
- Established: 1909
- Format: Stroke play
- Final year: 2002

Final champion
- Roger Roper

The Golf Illustrated Gold Vase was a prestigious amateur golf tournament in England. It was a 36-hole scratch stroke play competition.

== History ==
The contest for a gold vase was announced in The Times on 3 April 1909. The vase, valued at 250 guineas, was presented by the proprietors the Golf Illustrated. The initial event was to be at Mid-Surrey on 17 June and was open to amateurs with a handicap of scratch or better. The vase would be held by the winner's home club and the winner himself would receive a silver replica. Three consecutive wins would win the vase outright.

=== Winners ===
Year	Venue	Winners	Score	Margin of victory	Runner(s)-up	Ref
2003	Cardrona Golf Club	(England) Roger Roper				
2002	Walton Heath Golf Club	(England) Andrew Inglis				
2001	Walton Heath Golf Club	(England) James Heath				
2000	Walton Heath Golf Club	(England) John Kemp				
1999	Walton Heath Golf Club	(England) Mark Side	138	1 stroke	(England) Nick Soto	
1998	Walton Heath Golf Club	(England) Rupert Rea				
1997	Walton Heath Golf Club	(England) Mark James	142	4 strokes	(England) Chris Rodgers	
1996	Not played					
1995	The Oxfordshire Golf Club	(England) Anthony Wall	141	1 stroke	(England) Charlie Challen	
1994	Walton Heath Golf Club	(England) Simon Burnell	240	1 stroke	(England) Andrew Raitt	
1993	Sunningdale Golf Club	(England) Van Phillips (England) Charles Challen	131	Tie		
1992	Walton Heath Golf Club	(England) Paul Page	141	1 stroke	(England) Mathew Stanford (England) Lee Westwood	
1991	Sunningdale Golf Club	(England) Rupert Scott	142	2 strokes	(England) Lloyd Warwick (England) Gary Wolstenholme	
1990	Walton Heath Golf Club	(England) Andy Rogers				
1989	Sunningdale Golf Club	(England) Gary Wolstenholme	142	3 strokes	(England) Jim Payne	
1988	Walton Heath Golf Club	(England) Max Turner				
1987	Walton Heath Golf Club	(England) David Lane				
1986	Walton Heath Golf Club	(Guernsey) Bobby Eggo				
1985	Walton Heath Golf Club	(England) Mark Davis	145	2 strokes	(England) Gary Brett (England) Richard Latham	
1984	Walton Heath Golf Club	(England) Jon Marks	146	1 stroke	(England) Peter Baker	
1983	Walton Heath Golf Club	(England) Stephen Keppler	143	2 strokes	(England) Andrew Sherborne	
1982	Walton Heath Golf Club	(Scotland) Iain Carslaw	140	3 strokes	(England) Jonathan Plaxton	
1981	Walton Heath Golf Club	(England) Pat Garner	143	1 stroke	(Scotland) Gordon Brand Jnr	
1980	Walton Heath Golf Club	(Scotland) Gordon Brand Jnr	142	4 strokes	(England) Mark Johnson (England) Peter McEvoy (England) Paul Way (England) Brian Winteridge	
1979	Walton Heath Golf Club	(England) Kevin Miller	140	1 stroke	(England) Peter Thomas	
1978	Walton Heath Golf Club	(England) Peter Thomas	141	1 stroke	(England) Stuart Robson	
1977	Walton Heath Golf Club	(England) John Davies	141	1 stroke	(Scotland) Allan Brodie	
1976	Walton Heath Golf Club	(Scotland) Allan Brodie	141	1 stroke	(England) David Hyde	
1975	Walton Heath Golf Club	(England) Michael Bonallack	142	1 stroke	(England) Keith Tate	
1974	Walton Heath Golf Club	(England) Peter Hedges	146	1 stroke	(England) Peter Benka (England) David Harrison	
1973	Walton Heath Golf Club	(England) John Davies	142	1 stroke	(England) Nigel Denham	
1972	Sunningdale Golf Club	(England) Harry Ashby (England) Peter Davidson (England) Robin Hunter	143	Tie		
1971	Sunningdale Golf Club	(England) Michael Bonallack	137	6 strokes	(Republic of Ireland) Roddie Carr	
1970	Sunningdale Golf Club	(England) David Harrison	140	1 stroke	(England) Bruce Critchley	
1969	Sunningdale Golf Club	(England) Michael Bonallack (England) Jimmy Hayes	142	Tie		
1968	Sunningdale Golf Club	(England) Michael Bonallack	143	1 stroke	(England) Ted Dexter (England) Peter Oosterhuis	
1967	Sunningdale Golf Club	(England) Michael Bonallack (England) Bob Durrant	141	Tie		
1966	Sunningdale Golf Club	(South Africa) Bobby Cole (England) Peter Townsend	142	Tie		
1965	Sunningdale Golf Club	(England) Clive Clark	139	2 strokes	(England) Dudley Millensted	
1964	Sunningdale Golf Club	(England) David Moffat	148	1 stroke	(England) Michael Burgess	
1963	Sunningdale Golf Club	(England) Bob Mummery	143	5 strokes		
1962	Sunningdale Golf Club	(England) Brian Chapman	145	4 strokes	(England) Peter Green (England) David Harrison	
1961	Sunningdale Golf Club	(England) Michael Bonallack (England) David Harrison	141	Tie		
1960	Sunningdale Golf Club	(England) Doug Sewell	142	1 stroke	(England) Francis Francis (England) Gordon Huddy (England) Guy Wolstenholme	
1959	Sunningdale Golf Club	(Scotland) Alan Bussell	141	1 stroke	(England) Guy Wolstenholme	
1958	Sunningdale Golf Club	(England) Michael Lunt	141	3 strokes	(Scotland) James Walker	
1957	Sunningdale Golf Club	(England) Guy Wolstenholme	138	3 strokes	(England) Philip Scrutton	
1956	Sunningdale Golf Club	(Scotland) David Blair	141	3 strokes	(England) Philip Scrutton	
1955	Sunningdale Golf Club	(Scotland) David Blair	140	5 strokes	(England) W Henderson	
1954	Sunningdale Golf Club	(United States) Harold Ridgley	143	4 strokes	(Australia) Doug Bachli (Australia) Herb Berwick	
1953	Sunningdale Golf Club	(England) John Langley	143	2 strokes	(Republic of Ireland) Cecil Beamish	
1952	Sunningdale Golf Club	(England) John Langley	140	6 strokes	(United States) Dick Chapman	
1951	Southerndown Golf Club	(Republic of Ireland) Joe Carr	143	7 strokes	(United States) Dick Chapman	
1950	Western Gailes Golf Club	(Scotland) Alex Whyte	148	2 strokes	J L Hastings	
1949	Royal Dublin Golf Club	(England) Ronnie White	142	1 stroke	(Scotland) Charles Lawrie (Republic of Ireland) Joe Carr	
1948	Sunningdale Golf Club	(United States) Dick Chapman	143	4 strokes	(England) Harry Bentley (England) Charlie Stowe (United States) Robert Sweeny Jr.	
1940–1947: No tournament
1939	Pulborough Golf Club	(Wales) Sam Roberts	143	2 strokes	(England) Stanley Anderson	
1938	Bramshot Golf Club	(Scotland) Cameron Anderson	150	2 strokes	(Scotland) Andrew McNair	
1937	West Herts Golf Club	(United States) Robert Sweeny Jr.	137	7 strokes	(England) Rex Hartley (England) A G S Penman (England) K V Scott	
1936	Ashridge Golf Club	(Australia) Jim Ferrier	139	3 strokes	(Northern Ireland) Lionel Munn	
1935	Berkshire Golf Club	(England) Ivor Thomas	147	1 stroke	(Scotland) Andrew McNair (United States) Robert Sweeny Jr.	
1934	Walton Heath Golf Club	(England) Lister Hartley	147	4 strokes	(England) Noel Layton (Northern Ireland) Lionel Munn (Wales) Sam Roberts	
1933	Stoke Poges Golf Club	(England) Rex Hartley	143	1 stroke	(England) Cecil Hayward	
1932	Woking Golf Club	(England) Rex Hartley	147	3 strokes	(England) Raymond Oppenheimer	
1931	West Hill Golf Club	(Scotland) William Murray	147	1 stroke	(England) John Beck	
1930	Sunningdale Golf Club	(United States) Bobby Jones	143	1 stroke	(Northern Ireland) William Brownlow	
1929	Walton Heath Golf Club	(United States) Douglas Grant	151	1 stroke	(Scotland) William Murray	
1928	Northwood Golf Club	(England) Cyril Tolley	150	1 stroke	(Scotland) William Hope	
1927	Beaconsfield Golf Club	(England) Roger Wethered	147	1 stroke	(Scotland) Cyril Tolley	
1926	Addington Golf Club	(England) Cyril Tolley (Scotland) Tony Torrance	147	Tie		
1925	Moor Park Golf Club	(England) John Beck (England) Ernest Holderness	147	Tie		
1924	Moor Park Golf Club	(England) Colin Aylmer	149	2 strokes	(Scotland) William Murray	
1923	Oxhey Golf Club	(England) Cyril Tolley	153	1 stroke	(England) W A Powell	
1922	Stoke Poges Golf Club	(Scotland) William Murray	151	4 strokes	(England) Colin Aylmer	
1921	Sunningdale Golf Club	(England) Mark Seymour	149	4 strokes	(Scotland) Alex Armour (India) Hardit Malik (Scotland) Tony Torrance	
1920	St George's Hill Golf Club	(England) Stoner Crowther	154	1 stroke	(Scotland) Tommy Armour	
1919	Royal Mid-Surrey Golf Club	(England) Bernard Darwin	153	1 stroke	(England) Edwin Scott	
1915–1918: No tournament
1914	Sunningdale Golf Club	(England) Harold Hilton	151	4 strokes	(New Zealand) Harold Gillies	
1913	Walton Heath Golf Club	(England) Abe Mitchell	152	5 strokes	(Scotland) Robert Harris	
1912	Royal Mid-Surrey Golf Club	(Scotland) Robert Harris	147	2 strokes	(England) B Hammond-Chambers	
1911	Stoke Poges Golf Club	(Scotland) Robert Harris	145	3 strokes	(England) Herbert Taylor	
1910	Sunningdale Golf Club	(England) Abe Mitchell	150	5 strokes	(England) Angus Hambro	
1909	Royal Mid-Surrey Golf Club	(Scotland) Cecil Hutchison	146	7 strokes	(Scotland) Robert Harris	
