= Richard Holderness =

Richard Holderness may refer to:

- Richard Wood, Baron Holderness
- Sir Richard William Holderness, 3rd Baronet (1927–1998) of the Holderness baronets
