= 1923 Walker Cup =

Golf tournament

Coordinates: 56.343°N 2.803°W

2nd Walker Cup Match
- Dates: 18–19 May 1923
- Venue: Old Course
- Location: St Andrews, Scotland
- Captains: Robert Harris (Great Britain); Robert Gardner (USA)
(United Kingdom)	5	6	(United States)
- United States wins the Walker Cup

The 1923 Walker Cup, the second Walker Cup Match, was a team golf match played on 18 and 19 May 1923 on the Old Course at St Andrews in Fife, Scotland. The United States won 6 to 5, with one match halved.

== Format ==
There were ten players in each team. Four 36-hole matches of foursomes were played on Friday and eight singles matches on Saturday. Each of the 12 matches was worth one point in the larger team competition. Matches level after 36 holes were halved.

== Teams ==
=== Team Great Britain ===
Playing captain: (Scotland) Robert Harris

- (Scotland) John Caven
- (England) Ernest Holderness
- (England) Chubby Hooman
- (Scotland) William Hope
- (Scotland) Willis Mackenzie
- (Scotland) William Murray
- (England) Cyril Tolley
- (England) Roger Wethered
- (Scotland) John Wilson

Orme Bristowe was the reserve. John Caven was not selected for any matches.

=== Team United States ===
Playing captain: Robert Gardner

- Davidson Herron
- Jimmy Johnston
- Max Marston
- Jack Neville
- Francis Ouimet
- George Rotan
- Jess Sweetser
- Oscar Willing
- Fred Wright

== Friday's foursomes ==
	Results
Wethered/Tolley	(United Kingdom) 6 & 5	Ouimet/Sweetser
Harris/Hooman	(United States) 7 & 6	Gardner/Marston
Holderness/Hope	(United Kingdom) 1 up	Rotan/Herron
Wilson/Murray	(United Kingdom) 4 & 3	Johnston/Neville
3	Session	1
3	Overall	1

== Saturday's singles ==
	Results
Roger Wethered	halved	Francis Ouimet
Cyril Tolley	(United Kingdom) 4 & 3	Jess Sweetser
Robert Harris	(United States) 1 up	Robert Gardner
Willis Mackenzie	(United States) 5 & 4	George Rotan
William Hope	(United States) 6 & 5	Max Marston
Ernest Holderness	(United States) 1 up	Fred Wright
John Wilson	(United Kingdom) 1 up	Davidson Herron
William Murray	(United States) 2 & 1	Oscar Willing
2	Session	5
5	Overall	6
