= Cyril Tolley =

British amateur golf champion and politician (1895–1978)

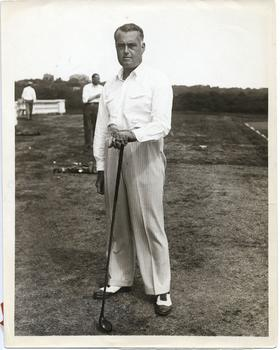
- Tolley in 1930

Personal information
- Full name: Cyril James Hastings Tolley
- Nationality: England
- Born: 14 September 1895 Brockley, England
- Died: 18 May 1978 (aged 82) Eastbourne, England

Career
- Sport: Golf
- Status: Amateur
- Professional wins: 2

Best results in major championships (wins: 2)
- U.S. Open: DNP
- The Open Championship: T18: 1924, 1933
- U.S. Amateur: DNQ: 1922
- British Amateur: Won: 1920, 1929

Major Cyril James Hastings Tolley MC (14 September 1895 – 18 May 1978) was a British amateur golf champion and briefly a Liberal Party politician.

== Early life ==
Tolley was the son of James T. Tolley and Christiana Mary Pascall. He was educated at University College, Oxford. He won the Military Cross at Ypres during the First World War for "conspicuous gallantry and devotion to duty in getting his Tank into action over very difficult ground. Walking in front of his Tank until close to his objectives, he then dispersed the crews of four separate machine guns and silenced them, one of which he captured himself, and thus materially assisted the infantry in the capture of a strong enemy redoubt which had held up the attack for some time." He was later captured, and spent thirteen months in a German prison camp.

== Career ==
Tolley was connected with the London Stock Exchange. He lived for a time in New York.

Tolly was also an excellent golfer. Tolley twice won The Amateur Championship in 1920 and 1929. In the 4th round in 1930 at St Andrews he lost to Bobby Jones on the 19th hole after Jones had laid a "horrid stymie" with Tolley within 4 feet of the hole. Jones eventually won the tournament. He won the French Open in 1924 and 1928 and was the Welsh Open Amateur Championship in 1921 and 1923. Tolley played in the first Walker Cup in 1922 and again in 1923, 1924, 1926, 1930, and 1934. He captained the team in 1924. He was captain of the R&A in 1948, being one of the few captains to play in the Amateur Championship during their year of office, losing in the third round to defending champion Willie Turnesa.

In 1928, Tolley launched a libel action against J. S. Fry & Sons of Bristol, chocolate manufacturers. Frys had produced an advert in which Tolley was caricatured and which contained a limerick, published in two newspapers in June 1928. Tolley claimed that the advert suggested that he had made some financial gain and had been guilty of conduct unworthy of his status as an amateur golfer. In 1929, Tolley won £1,000 damages although this decision was set aside by the Court of Appeal. Tolley then took the case to the House of Lords where he was successful but it was decided that the damages were excessive. Eventually, in July 1931, he received £500 damages and costs.

In the Second World War, he commanded a company of the Royal Sussex Regiment and was a liaison officer with the United States Army.

On 3 December 1949, Tolley was adopted as the North Devon Liberal Association's prospective parliamentary candidate. North Devon was a winnable seat, however, by 11 January 1950, he had been replaced as prospective candidate. Instead he became Liberal candidate for the less winnable Hendon South division of Middlesex for the 1950 General Election. However, he lost. He did not stand for parliament again. He continued his activity in the Liberal Party, serving as Honorary Treasurer of the London Liberal Party from 1950 to 1951. By the end of the decade he had left the Liberals and joined the Conservative Party. He was elected to Eastbourne Borough Council in 1958 and served for one 4-year term.

== Death ==
In 1978, Tolley died in Eastbourne, England.

== Tournament wins ==
- 1920 The Amateur Championship
- 1921 Welsh Open Amateur
- 1923 Golf Illustrated Gold Vase, Welsh Open Amateur
- 1924 French Open
- 1926 Golf Illustrated Gold Vase (tie with Tony Torrance)
- 1928 French Open, Golf Illustrated Gold Vase
- 1929 The Amateur Championship

== Major championships ==
=== Amateur wins (2) ===
Year	Championship	Winning score	Runner-up
1920	The Amateur Championship	37 holes	(United States) Robert A. Gardner
1929	The Amateur Championship	4 & 3	(Scotland) J. Nelson Smith

=== Results timeline ===
Tournament	1920	1921	1922	1923	1924	1925	1926	1927	1928	1929
The Open Championship	T40		T43	T35	T18 LA	T28	CUT	T36		T25
The Amateur Championship	1	R32	R256	QF	R16	R64		R64	R64	1
U.S. Amateur				DNQ						

Tournament	1930	1931	1932	1933	1934	1935	1936	1937	1938	1939
The Open Championship	T52			T18			CUT		T28	
The Amateur Championship	R32			SF	R64	R32	QF	R64	QF	R128

Tournament	1940	1941	1942	1943	1944	1945	1946	1947	1948	1949
The Open Championship	NT	NT	NT	NT	NT	NT				CUT
The Amateur Championship	NT	NT	NT	NT	NT	NT	R128	R128	R64	

Tournament	1950	1951	1952	1953	1954	1955
The Amateur Championship	SF	R32		R256		R256

Note: Tolley only played in The Open Championship, the U.S. Amateur, and The Amateur Championship.

Win
Top 10
Did not play

LA = low amateur
NT = no tournament
DNQ = did not qualify for match play portion
R256, R128, R64, R32, R16, QF, SF = round in which player lost in match play
"T" indicates a tie for a place

== Team appearances ==
- Walker Cup (representing Great Britain & Ireland): 1922, 1923, 1924 (playing captain), 1926, 1930, 1934
- Great Britain vs USA (representing Great Britain): 1921
- England–Scotland Amateur Match (representing England): 1922, 1923, 1924 (winners), 1925 (winners), 1926 (winners), 1927 (tie), 1928 (winners), 1929 (tie), 1930 (winners)

== Results in elections ==
General Election 1950: South Hendon
Party	Candidate	Votes	%	±%
Conservative	Sir Hugh Vere Huntly Duff Munro-Lucas-Tooth	24,917	52.2	
Labour	Thomas Sargant	15,389	32.2	
Liberal	Cyril James Hastings Tolley	7,436	15.6	
Majority		9,528	20.0	
Turnout			83.6	
Conservative hold		Swing		
