= Thomas Holderness =

British colonial administrator (1849–1924)

Sir Thomas Holderness Bt GCB KCSI

Permanent Under-Secretary of State for India
- In office 1912–1920

Secretary, Revenue, Statistics and Commerce Department, India Office
- In office 1901–1912

Secretary, Revenue and Agricultural Department, India
- In office 1898–1900

Personal details
- Born: Thomas William Holderness; 11 June 1849 Saint John, New Brunswick, Canada
- Died: 16 September 1924 (aged 75) Walton-on-the-Hill, Surrey, England

Sir Thomas William Holderness, 1st Baronet, GCB, KCSI (11 June 1849 – 16 September 1924) was the first former member of the Indian Civil Service to be appointed to the post of Permanent Under-Secretary of State for India (although Sir George Russell Clerk had previously been a member of the East India Company Civil Service).

== Early life and education ==
Holderness came from a wealthy Hull family, but was born in Saint John, New Brunswick, Canada, where his parents, John William Holderness and his wife Mary Ann (née Macleod), had settled. The family returned to England shortly after his birth. Although the premature death of his father in 1865 left the family in straitened circumstances, he managed to fund his education at Cheltenham College by winning several scholarships and prizes, and in 1879 he went up to University College, Oxford, again with a scholarship. He passed the entrance exam for the Indian Civil Service in 1870, one of only about forty who passed every year, with high enough marks to be allowed to choose which province he served in. He received a second in classical mods in 1871 and a second in law and modern history in 1872, before leaving for India after his graduation.

== Career in the Indian Civil Service ==
Holderness chose to enter civil service in the North-Western Provinces and served from 1873 to 1876 as a district officer in the small towns of Bijnor, Fatehpur, and Muzaffarnagar. He also wrote articles for the press, and his writings and administrative ability brought him to the notice of Lieutenant-Governor Sir John Strachey, who called him to the provincial capital, Allahabad, in 1876 to take up a post in the provincial government offices.

In 1881, he was appointed under-secretary to the Revenue Department of the Government of India in Calcutta. In 1885, he became head of Pilibhit district, and in 1888 he was appointed director of land records and agriculture of the North-Western Provinces. Later he became secretary to the Government of the North-West Provinces. In 1898, he was appointed secretary to the Revenue and Agricultural Department of the Government of India.

Upon retirement from the ICS in 1901, he joined the India Office in Whitehall as Secretary of the Revenue, Statistics and Commerce Department. Upon the death of Sir Richmond Ritchie in 1912, he became the permanent under-secretary, the professional head of the India Office, continuing to occupy the post until his retirement in 1919. Although he reached the usual retirement age of 65 in June 1914, he was granted an extension, which was extended still further after the outbreak of the First World War, in which his long experience of Indian administration was invaluable.

== Awards and honours ==
Holderness was appointed Companion of the Order of the Star of India (CSI) in 1898, awarded the Kaisar-i-Hind Medal in Gold in 1901, and appointed Knight Commander of the Order of the Star of India (KCSI) in 1907. He was then appointed Knight Commander of the Order of the Bath (KCB) in the 1914 Birthday Honours and Knight Grand Cross of the Order of the Bath (GCB) in the 1917 Birthday Honours, and was created a baronet, of Tadworth, in the County of Surrey, in the 1920 New Year Honours. He was offered a peerage, but refused it on financial grounds.

== Family and later life ==
On 14 March 1885, Holderness married Lucy Shepherd Elsmie, daughter of George Robert Elsmie, a fellow member of the ICS. They had a daughter and a son. He died suddenly while walking on the golf links at Walton-on-the-Hill near his home in Tadworth, Surrey. He was succeeded in the baronetcy by his son, Ernest, a British international golfer.

== Writings ==
- Narrative of the Indian Famine, 1897
- Editor, 4th edition of Sir John Strachey's India, 1911
- People and Problems of India, 1912

== Footnotes ==
Government offices
Preceded by Sir Edward Buck	Secretary to the Government of India in the Revenue and Agricultural Department; 1898–1900	Succeeded by Bampfylde Fuller
Preceded by Sir Charles Bernard	Secretary of the Revenue, Statistics and Commerce Department, India Office; 1901–1912	Succeeded by Francis Courtney Drake
Preceded by Sir Richmond Ritchie	Permanent Under-Secretary of State for India; 1912–1920	Succeeded by Sir William Duke
Baronetage of the United Kingdom
New creation	Baronet (of Tadworth); 1920–1924	Succeeded by Ernest Holderness
