= 1921 Open Championship =

Coordinates: 56.343°N 2.803°W

Tournament information
- Dates: 23–25 June 1921
- Location: St Andrews, Scotland
- Course: Old Course at St Andrews

Statistics
- Length: 6,487 yards (5,932 m)
- Field: 85 players
- Cut: None
- Prize fund: £200
- Winner's share: £75

Champion
- (Scotland) (United States) Jock Hutchison
- 296, playoff

Location in Scotland
Location in Fife, Scotland

The 1921 Open Championship was the 56th Open Championship, held 23–25 June at the Old Course in St Andrews, Scotland. Former local Jock Hutchison won his only Open Championship, in a 36-hole playoff over amateur Roger Wethered. It was Hutchison's second and final major title.

== Qualification ==
Qualifying took place on 20–21 June, Monday and Tuesday, with 18 holes on the Eden Course and 18 holes on the Old Course; the top 80 and ties qualified. Jock Hutchison led the field on 146; the qualifying score was 161 and 85 players advanced.

The entries included an unusually large number of U.S.-based players following a funding-raising campaign by an American golf magazine. On 27 September 1920 Golf Illustrated wrote a letter to the Professional Golfers' Association of America with a suggestion that a team of twelve to twenty American professionals be chosen to play in the British Open, to be financed by popular subscription. At that time no American golfer had won the British Open. The idea was that of James D. Harnett, who worked for the magazine. The PGA of America made a positive reply and the idea was announced in the November 1920 issue. The fund was called the British Open Championship Fund. By the next spring the idea had been firmed-up. A team of 12 would be chosen, who would sail in time to play a warm-up tournament at Gleneagles (the Glasgow Herald 1000 Guinea Tournament) prior to the British Open at St Andrews, two weeks later. The team of 12 was chosen by PGA president George Sargent and PGA secretary Alec Pirie, with the assistance of USGA vice-president Robert Gardner. A team of 11 sailed from New York on the RMS Aquitania on 24 May, together with James Harnett, Harry Hampton deciding at the last minute that he could not travel. The American team was: Jim Barnes, Emmet French, Clarence Hackney, Walter Hagen, Charles Hoffner, Jock Hutchison, Tom Kerrigan, George McLean, Fred McLeod, Bill Mehlhorn, and Wilfrid Reid.

The day before the Glasgow Herald Tournament, a match was played between the Americans and a team of British professionals, the first match between American and British professionals. It was a forerunner of the Ryder Cup matches, which began six years later in 1927.

After the Glasgow tournament, most of the American team travelled to St Andrews to practice, however, Walter Hagen and Jock Hutchison played in a tournament at Kinghorn on 14 and 15 June. Hagen had a poor first round and didn't turn up for the second day, while Hutchison scored 74 and 64 and took the £50 first prize. The American-based entry was augmented by two other professionals, Jack Burgess and James Douglas Edgar, and some amateurs, including Bobby Jones. All the American-based professionals qualified with the exception of Wilfrid Reid, who scored 163. Two of the amateurs qualified, Bobby Jones and Paul M. Hunter.

== Venue ==
Hole	Name	Yards	Hole	Name	Yards
1	Burn	365	10	Tenth ^	312
2	Dyke	402	11	High (In)	148
3	Cartgate (Out)	353	12	Heathery (In)	318
4	Ginger Beer	417	13	Hole O'Cross (In)	413
5	Hole O'Cross (Out)	533	14	Long	516
6	Heathery (Out)	370	15	Cartgate (In)	395
7	High (Out)	345	16	Corner of the Dyke	338
8	Short	142	17	Road	456
9	End	303	18	Tom Morris	361
Out		3,230	In		3,257
Source:			Total		6,487

^ The 10th hole was posthumously named for Bobby Jones in 1972.

== Details ==
During the first round on Thursday morning, Hutchison made a hole-in-one at the 8th and then drove the green at the par-4 9th, his ball settling inches from the hole. He finished with a round of 72 and a two-shot lead, and continued to lead after 36 holes at 147, a shot ahead of Jim Barnes and Ted Ray. In the two-day format, there was no cut after 36 holes.

After the third round on Friday morning, Hutchison trailed Barnes and Sandy Herd by four shots, but both co-leaders shot 80 in the final round and fell into a tie for sixth with five others. Wethered, a student at Oxford, carded 71 to finish at 296, while Hutchison shot 70 to tie and force a Saturday playoff.

== Playoff ==
Wethered almost did not make it to the playoff, as he was scheduled to play for his cricket team that day and had to be persuaded to stay and play golf. In the playoff, the first two holes were halved before Hutchison gained two shots at the 3rd. However he played a poor 4th hole and took six to make the match all square again. Hutchison took a grip on the match by scoring four threes from the 7th to the 10th while Wethered took four fours. At lunch, Hutchison held a three shot lead.

In the afternoon, Hutchison struggled at the first three holes but managed to halve the holes with Wethered. The match then turned decisively with Wethered taking six at the 4th and Hutchison taking threes at the 5th and 6th. Wethered dropped another shot at the 7th and now Hutchison was nine strokes ahead. Hutchison was in trouble at the 11th and took five but Wethered three-putted and only gained one stroke. Thereafter, Hutchison's lead increased to twelve before his cautious play at the final holes reduced the lead to nine.

Although a native of St Andrews, Hutchison had become a U.S. citizen and was credited as being the Open's first American champion. The Times reported under the headline "Cup Goes to U.S.A." that "our Open Championship goes for the first time in its history to America." The following year, Hagen became the first U.S.-born winner. Bobby Jones, 19, played at St Andrews and the Open for the first time, and was the low amateur after 36 holes. He withdrew in the third round after taking four shots to get out of a bunker at the 11th.

== Round summaries ==
=== First round ===
Thursday, 23 June 1921 (morning)

Place	Player	Score
1	(United States) Jock Hutchison	72
2	(England) Henry Kinch	73
T3	(England) Jim Barnes	74
T3	(Scotland) George Duncan	74
T3	(United States) Walter Hagen	74
T3	(United States) Tom Kerrigan	74
T3	(France) Arnaud Massy	74
T3	(England) Walter Pursey	74
T9	(England) Percy Alliss	75
T9	(Scotland) Sandy Herd	75
T9	(England) Percy Hills	75
T9	(United States) Charles Hoffner	75
T9	(United States) Paul M. Hunter (a)	75
T9	(United States) Bill Mehlhorn	75
T9	(England) Alfred Miles	75
T9	(England) Mark Seymour (a)	75

=== Second round ===
Thursday, 23 June 1921 (afternoon)

Place	Player	Score
1	(United States) Jock Hutchison	72-75=147
T2	(England) Jim Barnes	74-74=148
T2	(Jersey) Ted Ray	76-72=148
T4	(Scotland) George Duncan	74-75=149
T4	(Scotland) Sandy Herd	75-74=149
T4	(France) Arnaud Massy	74-75=149
T4	(United States) George McLean	76-73=149
T8	(England) Arthur Havers	76-74=150
T8	(England) Henry Kinch	73-77=150
T8	(Australia) Joe Kirkwood	76-74=150
T8	(England) Tom Williamson	79-71=150

=== Third round ===
Friday, 24 June 1921 (morning)

Place	Player	Score
T1	(England) Jim Barnes	74-74-74=222
T1	(Scotland) Sandy Herd	75-74-73=222
T3	(Australia) Joe Kirkwood	76-74-73=223
T3	(France) Arnaud Massy	74-75-74=223
5	(England) Tom Williamson	79-71-74=224
T6	(United States) Walter Hagen	74-79-72=225
T6	(England) Roger Wethered (a)	78-75-72=225
T8	(United States) Jock Hutchison	72-75-79=226
T8	(United States) Tom Kerrigan	74-80-72=226
T10	(Scotland) George Duncan	74-75-78=227
T10	(England) Arthur Havers	76-74-77=227

=== Final round ===
Friday, 24 June 1921 (afternoon)

Place	Player	Score	Money (£)
T1	(United States) Jock Hutchison	72-75-79-70=296	Playoff
T1	(England) Roger Wethered (a)	78-75-72-71=296	Playoff
3	(United States) Tom Kerrigan	74-80-72-72=298	40
4	(England) Arthur Havers	76-74-77-72=299	25
5	(Scotland) George Duncan	74-75-78-74=301	15
T6	(England) Jim Barnes	74-74-74-80=302	6; 8s 7d
T6	(United States) Walter Hagen	74-79-72-77=302	6; 8s 7d
T6	(Scotland) Sandy Herd	75-74-73-80=302	6; 8s 7d
T6	(Australia) Joe Kirkwood	76-74-73-79=302	6; 8s 7d
T6	(England) Fred Leach	78-75-76-73=302	6; 8s 7d
T6	(France) Arnaud Massy	74-75-74-79=302	6; 8s 7d
T6	(England) Tom Williamson	79-71-74-78=302	6; 8s 7d

Amateurs: Wethered (296), Hunter (307), Kyle (309), Seymour (314),
Armour (315), Murray (316), Harris (322), Quilter (327).

=== Playoff ===
Saturday, 25 June 1921

Place	Player	Score	Money (£)
1	(United States) Jock Hutchison	74-76=150	75
2	(England) Roger Wethered (a)	77-82=159	0

==== Scorecards ====
Morning round

Hole	1	2	3	4	5	6	7	8	9	Out	10	11	12	13	14	15	16	17	18	Back	Total
(United States) Hutchison	4	5	3	6	5	4	3	3	3	36	3	4	4	5	5	4	5	4	4	38	74
(England) Wethered	4	5	5	4	5	4	4	4	4	39	4	4	4	4	4	4	4	5	5	38	77

Afternoon round

Hole	1	2	3	4	5	6	7	8	9	Out	10	11	12	13	14	15	16	17	18	Back	Total
(United States) Hutchison	4	5	4	4	3	3	4	3	3	33	4	5	5	4	5	4	5	6	5	43	76
(England) Wethered	4	5	4	6	5	4	5	3	3	39	4	4	7	4	7	4	4	5	4	43	82
