= California State Amateur Championship =

Golf championship in California, US

The California Amateur Championship or California Amateur is a golf championship held in California for the state's top amateur golfers. The tournament is run by the California Golf Association. The first event was held in 1912 at the Del Monte Golf Club. It was played at Pebble Beach Golf Links from 1919 to 2006. The tournament rotates between Northern California and Southern California, and involves two rounds of stroke play followed by match play.

== Winners ==
- 2026 Kailer Stone
- 2025 Jacob Goode
- 2024 Caden Fioroni
- 2023 Zach Pollo
- 2022 Charlie Reiter
- 2021 Noah Woolsey
- 2020 Joey Vrzich
- 2019 William Mouw
- 2018 Bobby Bucey
- 2017 P. J. Samiere
- 2016 Shintaro Ban
- 2015 Shotaro Ban
- 2014 Xander Schauffele
- 2013 Cory McElyea
- 2012 Kevin Marsh
- 2011 Bhavik Patel
- 2010 Scott Travers
- 2009 Geoff Gonzalez
- 2008 Nick Delio
- 2007 Josh Anderson
- 2006 Jordan Nasser
- 2005 Don DuBois
- 2004 Spencer Levin
- 2003 Patrick Nagle
- 2002 Eddie Heinen
- 2001 Darryl Donovan
- 2000 Nick Jones
- 1999 Tim Hogarth
- 1998 Ed Cuff Jr.
- 1997 Jason Gore
- 1996 Mark Johnson
- 1995 Jeff Sanday
- 1994 Steve Woods
- 1993 Casey Boyns
- 1992 Todd Demsey
- 1991 Harry Rudolph III
- 1990 Charlie Wi
- 1989 Casey Boyns
- 1988 Don Parsons
- 1987 Mike Springer
- 1986 Terrence Miskell
- 1985 Sam Randolph
- 1984 Duffy Waldorf
- 1983 Kris Moe
- 1982 Gary Vanier
- 1981 Joe Tamburino
- 1980 Bobby Clampett
- 1979 Mark O'Meara
- 1978 Bobby Clampett
- 1977 Lee Mikles
- 1976 Mike Brannan
- 1975 John Cook
- 1974 Curtis Worley
- 1973 Mike Brannan
- 1972 Mac Hunter, Jr.
- 1971 Doug Nelson
- 1970 Bob Risch
- 1969 Forrest Fezler
- 1968 Johnny Miller
- 1967 Bob E. Smith
- 1966 Bob Eastwood
- 1965 Vern Callison
- 1964 Steve Oppermann
- 1963 Paul Travis
- 1962 Dick Lotz
- 1961 John Richardson
- 1960 Larry Bouchey
- 1959 Vern Callison
- 1958 Eli Bariteau
- 1957 Tal Smith
- 1956 Ken Venturi
- 1955 Bud Taylor
- 1954 Bud Taylor
- 1953 Gene Littler
- 1952 Bob Silvestri
- 1951 Ken Venturi
- 1950 Bob Gardner
- 1949 Mac Hunter
- 1948 Eli Bariteau
- 1947 Bob Gardner
- 1946 Bruce McCormick
- 1945 Bruce McCormick
- 1944 Ernie Pieper, Jr.
- 1943 Elmer Cites
- 1942 Johnny Dawson
- 1941 Ernie Pieper, Jr.
- 1940 Ed Monaghan
- 1939 Jack Gage
- 1938 Roger Kelly
- 1937 Roger Kelly
- 1936 Mat Palacio, Jr.
- 1935 Jack Gaines
- 1934 Stuart Hawley
- 1933 Charles Seaver
- 1932 Neil White
- 1931 David Martin
- 1930 Francis H.I. Brown
- 1929 Jack F. Neville
- 1928 J.J. McHugh
- 1927 J.J. McHugh
- 1926 Chandler Egan
- 1925 George Von Elm
- 1924 Capt. A. Bullock-Webster
- 1923 J.J. McHugh
- 1922 Jack F. Neville
- 1921 Paul Hunter
- 1920 Paul Hunter
- 1919 Jack F. Neville
- 1918 Douglas Grant
- 1917 Chas H. Walter
- 1916 Larry Cowing
- 1915 E.S. Armstrong
- 1914 H.K.B. Davis
- 1913 Jack F. Neville
- 1912 Jack F. Neville
