= Robert Harris (golfer) =

Scottish golfer

Personal information
- Nationality: Scotland
- Born: 10 October 1882 Dundee, Scotland
- Died: 17 March 1959 (aged 76) London, England

Career
- Sport: Golf
- Status: Amateur

Best results in major championships (wins: 1)
- Masters Tournament: DNP
- PGA Championship: DNP
- U.S. Open: DNP
- The Open Championship: T11: 1925
- British Amateur: Won: 1925

Robert Harris (10 October 1882 – 17 March 1959) was a Scottish amateur golfer. He won the 1925 the Amateur Championship and was the low amateur in the Open Championship the same year. He was the British Walker Cup captain on three occasions.

Harris was the son of William Harris, one of the founders of a stationery company, Burns & Harris, in Dundee, Scotland. Harris moved to London and was a member of the Stock Exchange.

As well as winning the Amateur Championship in 1925, he was also twice runner-up, losing 6&5 to Harold Hilton in 1913 and 7&6 to Roger Wethered in 1923. His 1925 win over Kenneth Fradgley by 13&12 was a record win in the Amateur Championship at the time. Harris was 6 up after 7 holes and 9 up after 18. He then won 4 of the first 6 of the second round to complete his victory.

He wrote a book "Sixty Years of Golf" published in 1953.

== Amateur wins ==
this list is incomplete

- 1911 Golf Illustrated Gold Vase
- 1912 Golf Illustrated Gold Vase
- 1925 The Amateur Championship

== Major championships ==
=== Wins (1) ===
Year	Championship	Winning score	Runner-up
1925	Amateur Championship	13 & 12	(England) Kenneth Fradgley

=== Results timeline ===
Tournament	1911	1912	1913	1914	1915	1916	1917	1918	1919	1920	1921	1922	1923	1924	1925	1926	1927
The Open Championship	T27				NT	NT	NT	NT	NT	T35	T63	T38			T11 LA		T36

Note: Harris only played in The Open Championship.

Did not play

LA = Low amateur
NT = No tournament
"T" indicates a tie for a place

== Team appearances ==
- Walker Cup (representing Great Britain): 1922 (playing captain), 1923 (playing captain), 1926 (playing captain), 1930
- England–Scotland Amateur Match (representing Scotland): 1905 (winners), 1908 (winners), 1910, 1911 (winners), 1912 (winners), 1922 (winners), 1923 (winners), 1924, 1925, 1926, 1927 (tie), 1928
- Coronation Match (representing the Amateurs): 1911
