= Davidson Herron =

American golfer (1897–1956)

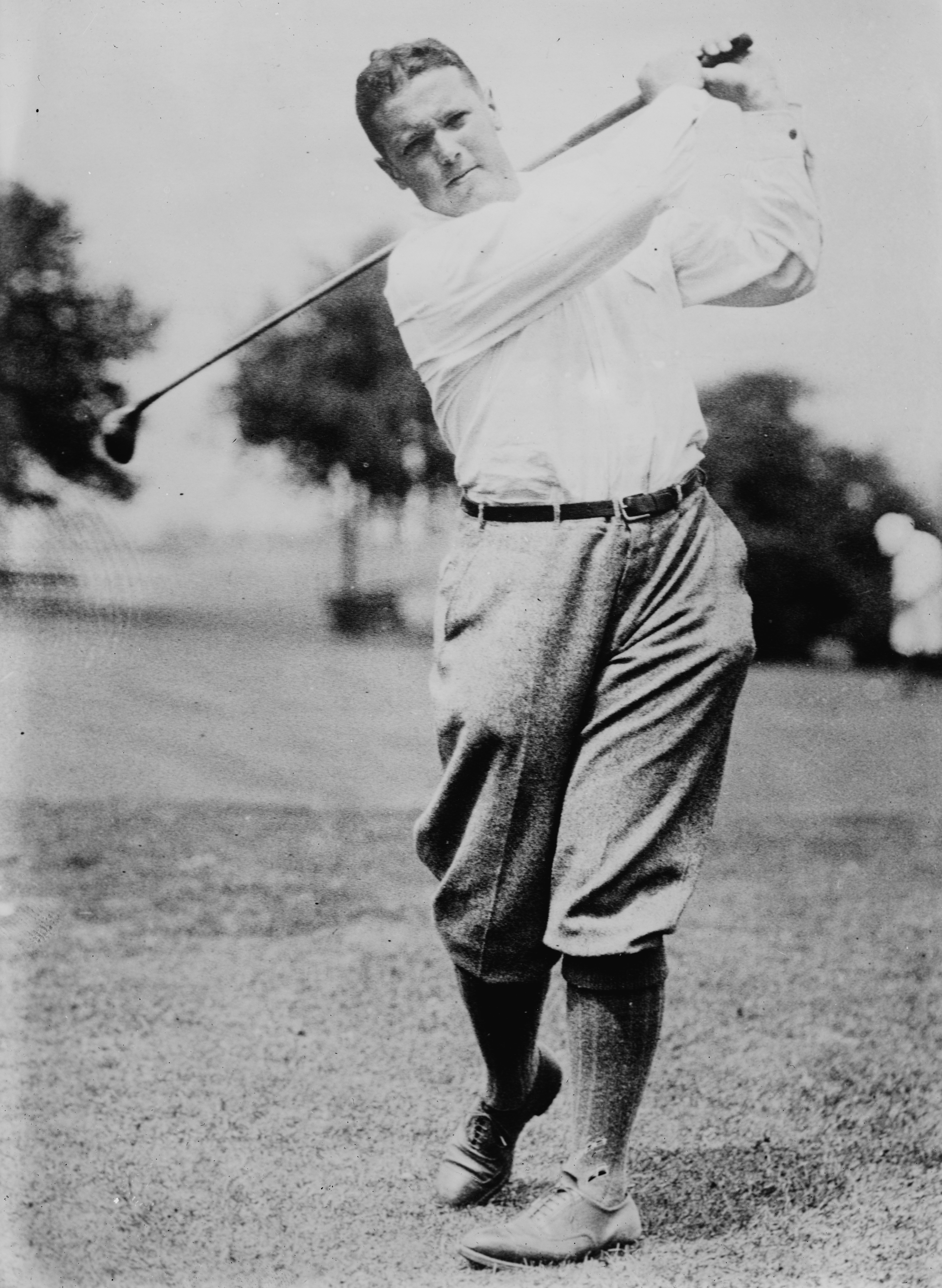

Personal information
- Full name: Samuel Davidson Herron
- Nationality: United States
- Born: October 16, 1897 Pittsburgh, Pennsylvania, U.S.
- Died: January 27, 1956 (aged 58) Pinehurst, North Carolina, U.S.

Career
- Sport: Golf
- Status: Amateur

Best results in major championships (wins: 1)
- Masters Tournament: DNP
- PGA Championship: DNP
- The Open Championship: DNP
- U.S. Amateur: Won: 1919

Samuel Davidson "Dave" Herron (October 16, 1897 – January 27, 1956) was an American amateur golfer.

== Golf career ==
Herron won the 1919 U.S. Amateur at Oakmont Country Club, his home club, defeating Bobby Jones in the final, 5 and 4.

Herron played on the winning 1923 Walker Cup team. He also won the Pennsylvania Amateur twice.

== Amateur wins ==
this list may be incomplete

- 1919 U.S. Amateur
- 1920 Pennsylvania Amateur
- 1929 Pennsylvania Amateur

== U.S. national team appearances ==
- Walker Cup: 1923 (winners)
