= Mark Johnson (golfer) =

American professional golfer (born 1954)

Personal information
- Full name: Mark William Johnson
- Nickname: Beer Man
- Nationality: United States
- Born: May 22, 1954 (age 72) Barstow, California, U.S.
- Height: 5 ft 10 in (1.78 m)
- Weight: 205 lb (93 kg; 14.6 st)

Career
- Sport: Golf
- Turned professional: 1972 (reinstated amateur); 1998
- Current tour: Champions Tour
- Former tour: Nationwide Tour
- Professional wins: 1

Number of wins by tour
- PGA Tour Champions: 1

Mark William "Beer Man" Johnson (born May 22, 1954) is an American professional golfer who plays on the Champions Tour.

== Professional career ==
Johnson was born in Barstow, California. He decided to forgo college and turned pro directly out of high school in 1972; he played on mini-tours around Southern California for two years, a decision which he regrets.

== Reinstated amateur status ==
Unable to support himself financially, Johnson regained his amateur status and for the next 18 years earned a living driving a Budweiser truck while continuing to hone his skills in amateur tournaments.

== Second professional career ==
In 1998, at the age of 45, Johnson parked his beer truck and regained his professional status. With the sponsorship of his long-time employer, H Olson Distributing of Barstow, and a handful of local businessmen, Johnson played five years on the Canadian Tour and a year on the Nationwide Tour to prepare for the Champions Tour, which he joined after reaching the age of 50 in May 2004.

Johnson won his first Champions Tour event at the 2005 Toshiba Senior Classic in his 14th start. He won in spectacular fashion holing out an 89-yard wedge shot for an eagle at the 510 yard par-5 18th hole.

Johnson's status as a former beer truck driver has earned him somewhat of a cult following from Champions Tour galleries. It is not uncommon to hear someone shout, "Way to Go Beer Man" during rounds. Johnson embraces the Beer Man persona, and has even named his personal website beermangolf.com.

== Personal life ==
Johnson lives in Helendale, California.

== Amateur wins (9) ==
- 1972 (1) CIF Championship (individual event)
- 1989 (1) SCGA Mid-Amateur
- 1990 (1) SCGA Tournament of Club Champions
- 1993 (1) SCGA Mid-Amateur
- 1994 (2) SCGA Mid-Amateur, Pacific Coast Amateur
- 1996 (2) California State Amateur, SCGA Tournament of Club Champions
- 1997 (1) SCGA Tournament of Club Champions

== Professional wins (1) ==
=== Champions Tour wins (1) ===
| No. | Date | Tournament | Winning score | Margin of victory | Runners-up |
|---|---|---|---|---|---|
| 1 | Mar 20, 2005 | Toshiba Senior Classic | −13 (67-63-70=200) | 4 strokes | (United States) Keith Fergus, (United States) Wayne Levi |
