= Thirty-five Years in the Punjab =

Book by George Robert Elsmie

Thirty-five Years in the Punjab, 1858-1893
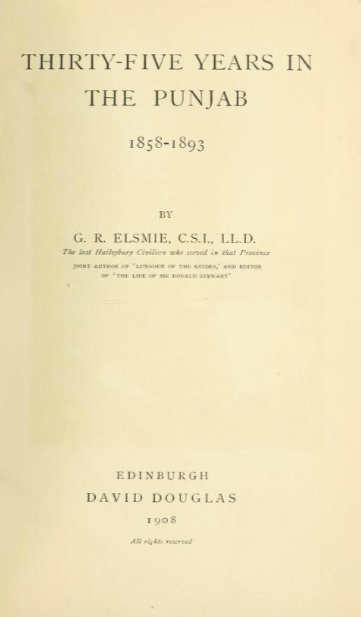
- Title page for Thirty-five Years in the Punjab (1908)
- Author: George Robert Elsmie
- Language: English
- Publisher: David Douglas
- Publication date: 1908
- Publication place: Scotland
- Media type: Print
- Pages: 386

Thirty-five Years in the Punjab is an English book, published in 1908, written by George Robert Elsmie, a civil officer in the Panjab for thirty-five years (1858-1893). This book consists mainly of extracts from letters and diaries by the author as he journeyed through the region.

== See also ==
- Panjab Castes, by Denzil Ibbetson
