= Panjab Castes =

Book by Denzil Ibbetson

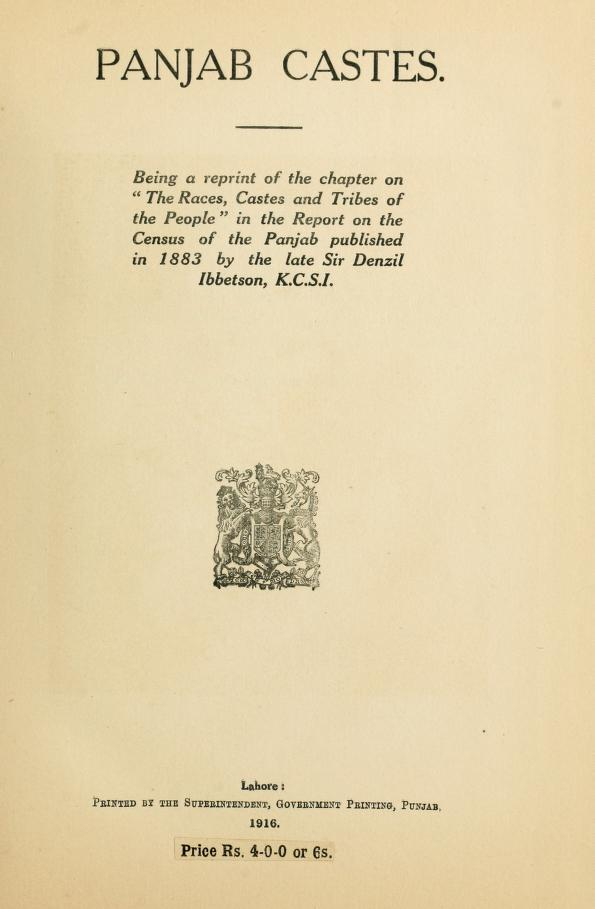
- Cover
- Author: Denzil Ibbetson
- Language: English
- Subject: Castes and tribes of the Panjab
- Publisher: The Superintendent, Government Printing, Panjab
- Publication date: 1916
- Publication place: India
- Media type: Print, On-line

Panjab Castes is a book based on a census report of the Panjab Province of British India by Sir Denzil Ibbetson, published in 1916. The census of the Panjab Province was carried out by Sir Denzil Ibbetson of the Indian Civil Service in 1881 and his report was published in 1883.

== See also ==
- Thirty-five years in the Punjab
- A Glossary of the Tribes and Castes of the Punjab and North-West Frontier Province
