= Ernest Holderness =

English golfer (1890–1968)

Sir Ernest William Elsmie Holderness, 2nd Baronet CBE (13 March 1890 – 23 August 1968) was an English amateur golfer and one of the Holderness baronets.

== Career ==
Holderness won The Amateur Championship in 1922 and 1924 and the Golf Illustrated Gold Vase in 1925. He played in the Walker Cup in 1923, 1926, and 1930.

== Amateur wins ==
- 1922 **The Amateur Championship**
- 1924 **The Amateur Championship**
- 1925 Golf Illustrated Gold Vase

Major championships in bold.

== Major championships ==
=== Amateur wins (2) ===
Year	Championship	Winning score	Runner-up
1922	The Amateur Championship	1 up	(Scotland) John Caven
1924	The Amateur Championship	3 & 2	(England) Eustace Storey

=== Results timeline ===
Tournament	1914	1915	1916	1917	1918	1919
The Amateur Championship	R128	NT	NT	NT	NT	NT

Tournament	1920	1921	1922	1923	1924	1925	1926	1927	1928	1929	1930	1931
The Amateur Championship	R16	QF	**1**	R64	**1**	R128	R128		R64			R128

Note: Holderness only played in the Amateur Championship.

Win
Top 10
Did not play

NT = No tournament
"T" indicates a tie for a place
R256, R128, R64, R32, R16, QF, SF = Round in which player lost in match play

Sources: The Glasgow Herald, May 20, 1914, pg. 12., The Glasgow Herald, June 10, 1920, pg. 9., The American Golfer, June 4, 1921, pg. 24., The Glasgow Herald, May 10, 1923, pg. 15., The Glasgow Herald, May 26, 1925, pg. 15., The Glasgow Herald, May 27, 1926, pg. 7., The Glasgow Herald, May 24, 1928, pg. 3.

== Team appearances ==
- Walker Cup (representing Great Britain): 1923, 1926, 1930
- Great Britain vs USA (representing Great Britain): 1921
- England–Scotland Amateur Match (representing England): 1922, 1923, 1924 (winners), 1925 (winners), 1926 (winners), 1928 (winners)

Baronetage of the United Kingdom
Preceded by Thomas Holderness	Baronet (of Tadworth); 1920–1968	Succeeded by Richard Holderness
