= Colin Aylmer =

English golfer

Personal information
- Full name: Collinson Charleton Aylmer
- Nationality: England
- Born: 6 February 1884 Cheltenham, Gloucestershire, England
- Died: 12 July 1964 (aged 80) Exeter, Devon, England

Career
- Sport: Golf
- Status: Amateur
- British Amateur: 2nd: 1910

Collinson Charleton Aylmer (6 February 1884 – 12 July 1964) was an English amateur golfer. He was runner-up in the 1910 Amateur Championship and was in the British team in the 1921 international match against America and in the first Walker Cup match in 1922.

Aylmer reached the final of the Amateur Championship in 1910, beating Harold Hilton 4&3 in the semi-final. However he lost heavily to John Ball in the final. 7 down after 18 holes, he eventually lost 10&9. He met Hilton again in a 1913 semi-final, losing by 1 hole. Aylmer was two up with four holes to play but lost the next three and could only halve the final hole.

Aylmer was secretary to a number of golf clubs. He was at Strathpeffer Golf Club before World War I and was at Ranelagh Golf Club from 1920 to 1929. He then took a similar position at the Roehampton Club.

== Amateur wins ==
- 1924 Golf Illustrated Gold Vase

== Team appearances ==
Amateur

- Walker Cup (representing Great Britain): 1922
- Great Britain vs USA (representing Great Britain): 1921
- England–Scotland Amateur Match (representing England): 1911, 1922, 1923, 1924 (winners)
