= Newton Wethered =

English non-fiction writer (1870–1957)

Herbert Newton Wethered (1870–1957) was a versatile English author, who wrote in a number of areas of non-fiction.

== Life ==
He was born on 14 November 1870, the third son of Henry Wethered, a colliery owner of Clifton, Bristol. His father Henry, who died in 1916, was the son of William Wethered and was born in Little Marlow, moving to the Bristol region around 1854, where he worked with his father and two brothers, Edwin and Joseph, in the coal business. Their sister Elizabeth married Handel Cossham. Cossham and H. O. Wills ultimately controlled the colliery.

Newton Wethered was educated at Clifton College from 1880 to 1888 and graduated B.A. from Corpus Christi College, Oxford in 1892. Around 1905 he made experiments with a friend, W. Graham Robertson, a friend, trying to recover the colour print process employed by William Blake.

== Works ==
- From Giotto to John: The Development of Painting (1920)
- Medieval Craftsmanship and the Modern Amateur (1923)
- The Architectural Side of Golf (1929), with Tom Simpson
- A Short History of Gardens (1933), influenced by Marie-Luise Gothein.
- The Mind of the Ancient World: A Consideration of Pliny's Natural History (1937)
- On the Art of Thackeray (1938)
- The Four Paths of Pilgrimage (1947)
- Design for Golf (1952), with Tom Simpson
- Selected Essays of E. V. Lucas (1954), editor
- The Curious Art of Autobiography, from Benvenuto Cellini to Rudyard Kipling (1956)

== Family ==
In 1890, Wethered married Marion Emmeline Lund, daughter of James Lund, and sister of Reginald William Lund, a college contemporary. They had a son and a daughter, who were the golfers Roger Wethered and Joyce Wethered.
