= Robert Gardner (golfer) =

American professional golfer (1890–1956)

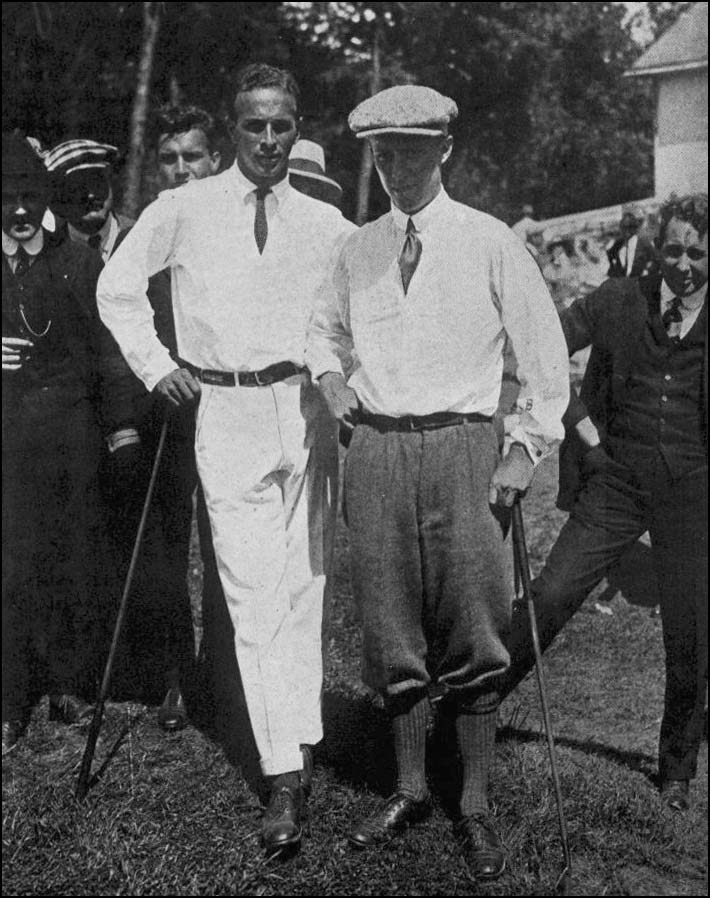

Personal information
- Full name: Robert Abbe Gardner
- Nationality: United States
- Born: April 9, 1890 Hinsdale, Illinois, U.S.
- Died: June 21, 1956 (aged 66) Lake Forest, Illinois, U.S.
- Spouse: Katherine Keep
- Children: Mary (1919)

Career
- Sport: Golf
- College: Yale University
- Status: Amateur

Best results in major championships (wins: 2)
- Masters Tournament: DNP
- PGA Championship: DNP
- U.S. Open: T23: 1911
- The Open Championship: DNP
- U.S. Amateur: Won: 1909, 1915
- British Amateur: 2nd: 1920

Robert Abbe Gardner (April 9, 1890 – June 21, 1956) was an American multi-sport athlete best known for winning the U.S. Amateur in golf twice.

== Early life and education ==
In 1890, Gardner was born in Hinsdale, Illinois. He spent most of his life in the Chicago area. He attended Phillips Academy in Andover, Massachusetts. He graduated from Yale University in 1912, where he was a member of Skull and Bones.

While a sophomore at Yale, Gardner won the 1909 U.S. Amateur golf tournament over Chandler Egan at the Chicago Golf Club. He was the youngest winner, at 19 years, 5 months, of the U.S. Amateur. His record stood for 85 years until Tiger Woods won his first of three amateurs. Gardner also finished runner-up at the 1911 Western Amateur while still in college.

Golf was not the only sport Gardner excelled at. On June 1, 1912, at an intercollegiate track and field competition in Philadelphia, he set the world pole vault record at 13 feet 1 inch (3.99 m). This record would be short lived as Marc Wright vaulted 13 feet 2 1/4 inches (4.020 m) one week later at the Olympic trials in Cambridge, Massachusetts.

== Career ==
After college, Gardner would continue to have success at the U.S. Amateur. Gardner won the event in 1915. The following year, he also reached the finals but lost.

Gardner enlisted in the Army in 1917 and served in France during World War I as a lieutenant in a field artillery unit. After the war he returned to Chicago and joined a stock brokerage firm where he spent the rest of his career. He served as president of the Chicago District Golf Association (CDGA) for many years and also served on several United States Golf Association committees.

Gardner continued to have success as an amateur golfer. In 1920 and 1921, respectively, he reached the finals of the British Amateur and U.S. Amateur. He won the CDGA Amateur Championship three times: in 1916, 1924, and 1925.

Gardner also was national champion in another sport, racquets. He and Howard Linn won the national doubles racquets championship in 1926 and 1929.

== Personal life ==
In the 1910s, Gardner married Katherine; they had one daughter.

In 1956, Gardner died in Lake Forest, Illinois. He was 66 years old.

== Amateur wins ==
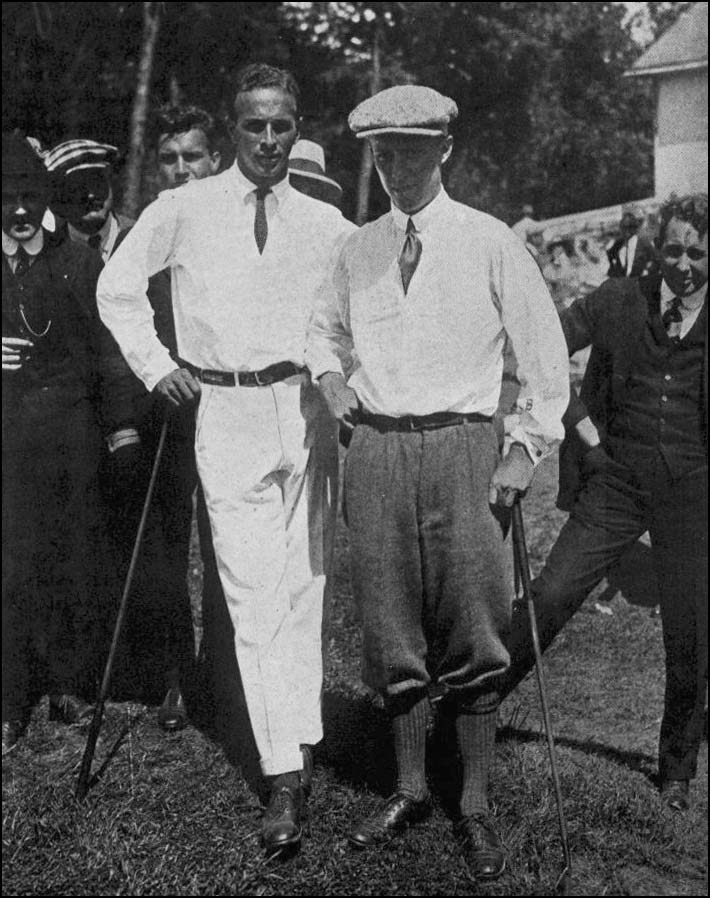
Gardner (left) during the 1916 U.S. Amateur. To the right is Chick Evans, who beat Gardner in the final match.

- 1909 U.S. Amateur
- 1915 U.S. Amateur
- 1916 Chicago District Amateur
- 1924 Chicago District Amateur
- 1925 Chicago District Amateur

== Major championships ==
=== Wins (2) ===
Year	Championship	Winning score	Runner-up
1909	U.S. Amateur	4 & 3	(United States) Chandler Egan
1915	U.S. Amateur	5 & 4	(United States) John G. Anderson

=== Results timeline ===
Tournament	1909	1910	1911	1912	1913	1914	1915	1916	1917	1918	1919
U.S. Open			T23						NT	NT	
U.S. Amateur	1	DNQ	R32		R32	QF	1	2	NT	NT	R16
British Amateur							NT	NT	NT	NT	NT

Tournament	1920	1921	1922	1923	1924	1925	1926	1927	1928	1929
U.S. Open										
U.S. Amateur	R16	2	R16	SF	R32	DNQ	DNQ	DNQ		
British Amateur	2			R256			R256			

Tournament	1930	1931	1932	1933	1934
U.S. Open					
U.S. Amateur					R256
British Amateur					

Win
Top 10
Did not play

LA = Low Amateur
NT = No tournament
"T" indicates a tie for a place
DNQ = Did not qualify for match play portion
R256, R128, R64, R32, R16, QF, SF = Round in which player lost in match play

Source for U.S. Open and U.S. Amateur: USGA Championship Database

Source for 1920 British Amateur: The American Golfer, June 19, 1920, pg. 8.

Source for 1923 British Amateur: The American Golfer, July, 1923, pg. 10.

Source for 1926 British Amateur: The American Golfer, July, 1926, pg. 58.

== U.S. national team appearances ==
Amateur

- Walker Cup: 1922 (winners), 1923 (winners, playing captain), 1924 (winners, playing captain), 1926 (winners, playing captain)
