= Holderness baronets =

Baronetcy in the Baronetage of the United Kingdom

The Holderness Baronetcy, of Tadworth in the County of Surrey, is a title in the Baronetage of the United Kingdom. It was created on 16 February 1920 for Sir Thomas Holderness, GCB, KCSI, Permanent Under-Secretary of State for India from 1912 to 1920.

== Holderness baronets, of Tadworth (1920) ==
- Sir Thomas William Holderness, 1st Baronet (1849–1924)
- Sir Ernest William Elsmie Holderness, 2nd Baronet (1890–1968)
- Sir Richard William Holderness, 3rd Baronet (1927–1998)
- Sir Martin William Holderness, 4th Baronet (born 1957)
  - Matthew William Thornton Holderness (born 1990) heir apparent
