= Roger Wethered =

English amateur golfer (1899–1983)

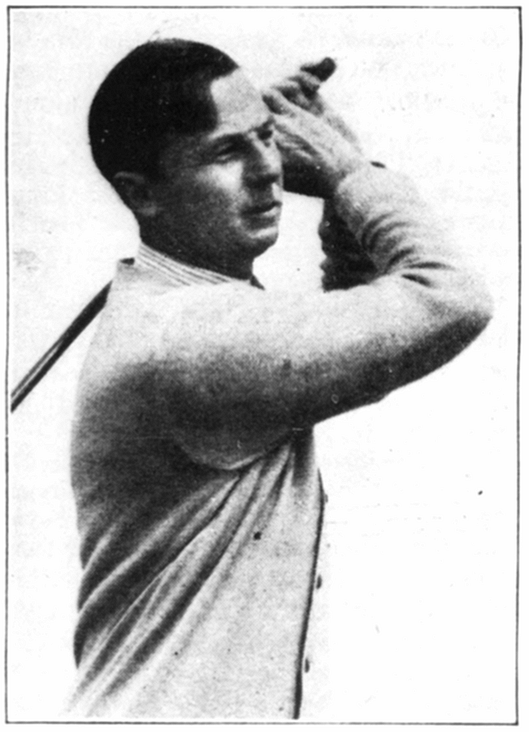
- Wethered in 1930

Personal information
- Full name: Roger Henry Wethered
- Nationality: England
- Born: 3 January 1899 New Malden, England
- Died: 12 March 1983 (aged 84) Wimbledon, England

Career
- Sport: Golf
- Status: Amateur

Best results in major championships (wins: 1)
- U.S. Open: DNP
- The Open Championship: 2nd: 1921
- U.S. Amateur: DNQ: 1922
- British Amateur: Won: 1923

Roger Henry Wethered (3 January 1899 – 12 March 1983) was an English amateur golfer, and the brother of female golfer Joyce Wethered.

== Early life ==
Born in Surrey, Wethered was the only son of Herbert Newton Wethered and his wife Marion Emmeline Lund. He was frequently ill as a child and this resulted in him being home-tutored. His father had authored numerous books about golf and this proved to be influential on Wethered as he took up golf from an early age.

Wethered was called up in 1918 to serve in the Royal Artillery in World War I. However, he was recalled from France some weeks later as peacetime was declared. Upon his return he enrolled at Christ Church at Oxford University. He joined the Oxford golf team with Cyril Tolley, a good friend of his, and both were successful young golfers. His game was defined by great power and technique with iron clubs. His driving was less accomplished but his ability to recover more than made up for this shortcoming.

He graduated from Oxford with a BA in English in 1921.

== Golfer ==
Wethered narrowly lost The Open Championship to Jock Hutchison in the 1921 edition of the tournament. Had he won the competition he would have been the last British amateur to do so. No British amateur had come so close since Harold Hilton won the 1897 Open Championship. He followed this achievement with further successes: his driving began to improve and he won his first Amateur Championship in 1923 at Deal, Kent. This was the peak of his sporting career. He continued to earn the respect of his peers for his modest demeanour.

A runner up in the Amateur Championship twice (1928 and 1930), Wethered won the President's Putter five times. Furthermore, he was capped by England numerous times in competition against Scotland and in the Walker Cup against the United States, emerging victorious with regularity. In singles competition he beat all-comers, losing only to American golfer Bobby Jones. He continued to be involved in golf, however, working with the committee at The Royal and Ancient Golf Club of St Andrews. He was elected captain of the club in 1939 and finally took office in 1946. He was successful as an investor and upon his retirement he returned to the golf courses to play out his remaining days. At the age of 74 he scored a remarkable round of 74 at the Royal Wimbledon Golf Club. He died at his home at Garnet House, Wimbledon.

Wethered's golfing abilities had begun to wane by the 1930s and his focus turned to his career as a stockbroker in London.

== Personal life ==
Wethered was married twice, but was childless. His first wife was Elizabeth, daughter of Lord Charles Cavendish-Bentinck (1868–1956), marriage dissolved in 1954. His second wife was Marjorie Stratford, whom he married in 1957.

== Results in major championships ==
=== Amateur wins (1) ===
Year	Championship	Winning score	Runner-up
1923	The Amateur Championship	7 & 6	(Scotland) Robert Harris

=== Results timeline ===
Tournament	1920	1921	1922	1923	1924	1925	1926	1927	1928	1929
The Open Championship		2 LA	T32		WD				CUT	
The Amateur Championship	R64	R256	QF	1	SF	R128	R128	SF	2	R128
U.S. Amateur			DNQ							

Tournament	1930	1931	1932	1933	1934	1935	1936
The Open Championship							
The Amateur Championship	2	R16	R128	R32	R32		R32
U.S. Amateur							

Note: Wethered only played in The Open Championship, The Amateur Championship, and U.S. Amateur.

Win
Top 10
Did not play

DNQ = Did not qualify for match play portion
LA = Low amateur
WD = withdrew
CUT = missed the half-way cut
R64, R32, R16, QF, SF = Round in which player lost in match play
"T" indicates a tie for a place

Source for British Open: www.opengolf.com

Source for 1920 British Amateur: The Glasgow Herald, 9 June 1920, pg. 11.

Source for 1921 British Amateur: The Glasgow Herald, 24 May 1921, pg. 3.

Source for 1922 U.S. Amateur: USGA Championship Database

Source for 1922 British Amateur: The American Golfer, 1 July 1922, pg. 31.

Source for 1924 British Amateur: The American Golfer, 28 June 1924, pg. 17.

Source for 1925 British Amateur: Golf Illustrated, July, 1925, pg. 40.

Source for 1926 British Amateur: Golf Illustrated, July, 1926, pg. 23.

Source for 1927 British Amateur: The American Golfer, July, 1927, pg. 15.

Source for 1929 British Amateur: The Glasgow Herald, 13 June 1929, pg. 10.

Source for 1931 British Amateur: The Glasgow Herald, 21 May 1931, pg. 16.

Source for 1932 British Amateur: The Glasgow Herald, 25 May 1932, pg. 6.

Source for 1933 British Amateur: The Glasgow Herald, 23 June 1933, pg. 20.

Source for 1934 British Amateur: Pittsburgh Post-Gazette, 24 May 1934, pg. 19.

Source for 1936 British Amateur: The Age, 29 May 1936, pg. 12.

== Team appearances ==
- Walker Cup (representing Great Britain & Ireland): 1922, 1923, 1926, 1930 (playing captain), 1934
- Great Britain vs USA (representing Great Britain): 1921
- England–Scotland Amateur Match (representing England): 1922, 1923, 1924 (winners), 1925 (winners), 1926 (winners), 1927 (tie), 1928 (winners), 1929 (tie), 1930 (winners)

== See also ==
- List of The Open Championship champions
