= England–Scotland Amateur Match =

Amateur golf competition

Tournament information
- Established: 1902
- Format: Team match play
- Final year: 1931

Final champion
- Scotland

The England–Scotland Amateur Match was an annual men's amateur golf competition organized by the Royal and Ancient Golf Club, contested by teams representing England and Scotland, with the winners being presented with the Walker Cup. It was played from 1902 to 1931, although the match lapsed between 1913 and 1921. It was played in connection with The Amateur Championship, on the Saturday either before or after the championship.

The match continued after 1931 but was organised by the national golf unions as part of the Men's Home Internationals, in which Ireland and Wales also competed.

== History ==
The 1902 match was decided by holes. After the morning round Scotland led in 5 matches, England in 4 with one level. At that point Scotland led by just one hole 14–13. In the afternoon rounds Scotland led in 6 matches, England in 3 with one level. In the afternoon matches alone Scotland won by 6 holes, 18–12. Over the 36 holes Scotland had won 6 of the 10 matches, England winning the other 4, Scotland winning by 28 holes in their 6 wins, England by 21 in their 4 wins. Some sources give the result as 32–25, the sum of the morning and afternoon results, while others give 28–21. Either way, Scotland won by 7 holes.

The event lapsed after 1912. A match was planned for 1921 but was cancelled because a match between Britain and America had been arranged, the forerunner of the Walker Cup matches.

Starting in 1927 Scotland and Ireland had played an annual match. In 1927 and 1929 this was held in Ireland, before the Irish Amateur Open Championship, while in 1928 and 1930 it was held in Scotland, just before the England–Scotland match.

The 1931 Amateur Championship was held at Royal North Devon. On the previous occasions that it had been held there, there were far fewer Scottish entries than normal and as a consequence the Scottish team was not fully representative. It was therefore decided to hold the England–Scotland match at a different time and on a different venue, being played at Royal Liverpool in August. In addition it was decided to play a match between England and Ireland on the day before. Ireland and Scotland had already decided to hold their match in Ireland in September. It was later arranged that a Welsh team should attend, playing matches against Scotland and Ireland on the days when England were playing Ireland and Scotland. England beat Ireland 10–4 while Wales lost 2–12 to Scotland and 2–11 to Ireland. England did not play Wales. With Scotland winning both their matches and then beating Ireland the following month, they were the unofficial champion country.

The Men's Home Internationals, in which all four countries play each other, started in 1932. In 1952 Raymond Oppenheimer, an ex-England and Walker Cup captain, presented a trophy for the tournament, known as the Raymond Trophy.

== Format ==
The 1902 match had teams of 10, who played singles matches over 36 holes. All 36 holes were played and the overall result was decided by holes won. From 1903 the teams were reduced to 9-a-side and the result was decided by matches. Extra holes were played if necessary to achieve a result. The format was changed for 1912, the main consisting of 5 foursomes matches rather than 9 singles.

When the event was revived in 1922 the format was changed. There were teams of 10 playing 5 foursomes matches in the morning and 10 singles in the afternoon. Matches were over 18 holes with halved matches not counting.

== Results ==
Year	Date	Venue	Winners	Score	Ref
1902	26 April	Royal Liverpool	Scotland	28–21	
1903	23 May	Muirfield	England	5–4	
1904	28 May	Royal St George's	Scotland	6–3	
1905	20 May	Prestwick	Scotland	6–3	
1906	19 May	Royal Liverpool	Scotland	7–2	
1907	25 May	St Andrews	Scotland	8–1	
1908	23 May	Royal St George's	Scotland	5–4	
1909	22 May	Muirfield	Scotland	7–2	
1910	28 May	Royal Liverpool	England	5–4	
1911	27 May	Prestwick	Scotland	5–4	
1912	1 June	Royal North Devon	Scotland	3–2	
1913–1921: Not held
1922	20 May	Prestwick	Scotland	10–4	
1923	5 May	Royal Cinque Ports	Scotland	7–5	
1924	24 May	St Andrews	England	9–6	
1925	23 May	Royal North Devon	England	8–5	
1926	22 May	Muirfield	England	9–5	
1927	21 May	Royal Liverpool	Tie	7–7	
1928	19 May	Prestwick	England	12–1	
1929	8 June	Royal St George's	Tie	7–7	
1930	24 May	St Andrews	England	8–4	
1931	8 August	Royal Liverpool	Scotland	7–6	

The 1902 match was decided by holes.

== Appearances ==
The following are those who played in at least one of the matches.

=== England ===
==== 1902–1912 ====
- Colin Aylmer 1911
- John Ball 1902, 1903, 1904, 1905, 1906, 1907, 1908, 1909, 1910, 1911, 1912
- Herbert Barker 1907
- Gordon Barry 1906, 1907
- Johnnie Bramston 1902
- Frank Carr 1911
- Horace Castle 1903, 1904
- Harry Colt 1908
- Bernard Darwin 1902, 1904, 1905, 1908, 1909, 1910
- Reymond de Montmorency 1908
- Herman de Zoete 1903, 1904, 1906, 1907
- Humphrey Ellis 1902, 1912
- William Herbert Fowler 1903, 1904, 1905
- Sidney Fry 1902, 1903, 1904, 1905, 1906, 1907, 1909
- Harold Gillies 1908
- Angus Hambro 1908, 1909, 1910
- Harold Hambro 1905
- Harold Hilton 1902, 1903, 1904, 1905, 1906, 1907, 1909, 1910, 1911, 1912
- Charles Hooman 1910
- Charles Hutchings 1902
- Horace Hutchinson 1902, 1903, 1904, 1906, 1907, 1909
- Edward Lassen 1909, 1910, 1911, 1912
- Alan Lincoln 1907
- Abe Mitchell 1910, 1911, 1912
- Frank Mitchell 1906, 1907, 1908
- Chales Palmer 1909
- Beaumont Pease 1903, 1904, 1905, 1906
- Vivian Pollock 1908
- Michael Scott 1911, 1912
- Osmund Scott 1902, 1905, 1906
- Edward Scratton 1912
- Everard Martin Smith 1908, 1909, 1910, 1912
- George Smith 1902, 1903
- Leicester Stevens 1912
- Herbert Taylor 1911
- Frank Woolley 1910, 1911, 1912
- James Worthington 1905

==== 1922–1931 ====
- Colin Aylmer 1922, 1923, 1924
- John Beck 1926, 1930
- John Beddard 1927, 1928, 1929
- Harry Bentley 1931
- Dale Bourn 1930
- Carl Bretherton 1922, 1923, 1924, 1925
- Leonard Crawley 1931
- Bernard Darwin 1923, 1924
- John de Forest 1931
- Froes Ellison 1922, 1925, 1926, 1927
- Eric Fiddian 1929, 1930, 1931
- Harold Gillies 1925, 1926, 1927
- Angus Hambro 1922
- Ronald Hardman 1927, 1928
- Rex Hartley 1926, 1927, 1928, 1929, 1930, 1931
- Lister Hartley 1927, 1931
- Ernest Hassall 1923
- Cecil Hayward 1925
- Charles Hodgson 1924
- Ernest Holderness 1922, 1923, 1924, 1925, 1926, 1928
- Charles Hooman 1922
- Geoffrey Illingworth 1929
- Noel Layton 1922, 1923, 1926
- Gustav Mellin 1922
- Raymond Oppenheimer 1930
- Philip Perkins 1927, 1928, 1929
- W Powell 1923, 1924
- Samuel Robinson 1925
- Sidney Roper 1931
- Michael Scott 1923, 1924, 1925, 1926
- Eric Martin Smith 1931
- Eustace Storey 1924, 1925, 1926, 1927, 1928, 1930
- Bill Stout 1928, 1929, 1930, 1931
- Bill Sutton 1929, 1931
- William Tweddell 1928, 1929, 1930
- Cyril Tolley 1922, 1923, 1924, 1925, 1926, 1927, 1928, 1929, 1930
- Roger Wethered 1922, 1923, 1924, 1925, 1926, 1927, 1928, 1929, 1930

In their match against Ireland in 1931 England had the same team that played against Scotland the following day.

=== Scotland ===
==== 1902–1912 ====
- Archibald Aitken 1906, 1907, 1908
- Robert Andrew 1905, 1906, 1907, 1908, 1909, 1910
- Leslie Balfour-Melville 1902, 1903
- Harold Beveridge 1908
- Edward Blackwell 1902, 1904, 1905, 1906, 1907, 1909, 1910, 1912
- Arnold Blyth 1904
- Guy Campbell 1909, 1910, 1911
- Charles Dick 1902, 1903, 1904, 1905, 1909, 1912
- Walter Fairlie 1912
- Samuel Mure Fergusson 1902, 1903, 1904
- John Gairdner 1902
- John Graham Jr. 1902, 1903, 1904, 1905, 1906, 1907, 1908, 1909, 1910, 1911
- Robert Harris 1905, 1908, 1910, 1911, 1912
- Norman Hunter 1903, 1912
- Cecil Hutchison 1904, 1905, 1906, 1907, 1908, 1909, 1910, 1911, 1912
- James Jenkins 1908, 1912
- Johnny Laidlay 1902, 1903, 1904, 1905, 1906, 1907, 1908, 1909, 1910, 1911
- Gordon Lockhart 1911, 1912
- John L. Low 1904
- Charles Macfarlane 1912
- Fred Mackenzie 1902, 1903
- Robert Maxwell 1902, 1903, 1904, 1905, 1906, 1907, 1909, 1910
- James Robb 1902, 1903, 1905, 1906, 1907
- James Robertson-Durham 1911
- Frank Scroggie 1910
- Gordon Simpson 1906, 1907, 1908, 1909, 1911, 1912
- George Wilkie 1911

==== 1922–1931 ====
- Alex Armour 1922
- Edward Blackwell 1923, 1924, 1925
- Jack Bookless 1930, 1931
- Harry Braid 1922, 1923
- Tom Burrell 1924
- William Campbell 1928, 1929, 1930, 1931
- John Caven 1926
- James Dawson 1930, 1931
- Robert Denholm 1931
- Charles Gibb 1927
- Allan Graham 1925
- William Guild 1925, 1927, 1928
- Robert Harris 1922, 1923, 1924, 1925, 1926, 1927, 1928
- William Hope 1923, 1925, 1926, 1927, 1928, 1929
- Willie Hunter 1922
- Andrew Jamieson Jr. 1927, 1928, 1931
- James Jenkins 1922, 1924, 1926, 1928
- Dennis Kyle 1924, 1930
- Edward Kyle 1925
- Jack Lang 1929, 1931
- Willis Mackenzie 1923, 1926, 1927, 1929
- Gilbert Manford 1922, 1923
- Archibald McCallum 1929
- Sam McKinlay 1929, 1930, 1931
- Eric McRuvie 1929, 1930, 1931
- Alex Menzies 1925
- William Murray 1923, 1924, 1925, 1926, 1927
- Thomas Osgood 1925
- Robert Scott Jr. 1924, 1928
- Fred Simpson 1927
- Gordon Simpson 1922, 1924, 1926
- John Nelson Smith 1929, 1930, 1931
- Keith Thorburn 1928
- Tony Torrance 1922, 1923, 1925, 1926, 1928, 1929, 1930
- William Breck Torrance 1922, 1923, 1924, 1926, 1927, 1928, 1930
- William Tulloch 1927, 1929, 1930, 1931
- John Wilson 1922, 1923, 1924, 1926

In their match against Wales in 1931 Scotland had the same team that played against England the following day.
