= John Graham Jr. (golfer) =

Scottish golfer (1877–1915)

- Graham hitting a tee shot, circa 1900

Personal information
- Nationality: Scotland
- Born: 1877 Liverpool, England
- Died: 16 June 1915 (aged 37–38) France

Career
- Sport: Golf
- Status: Amateur

Best results in major championships
- Masters Tournament: DNP
- PGA Championship: DNP
- U.S. Open: DNP
- The Open Championship: 4th: 1906

John Graham Jr. (1877 – 16 June 1915) was a Scottish amateur golfer. He had three top-10 finishes in the Open Championship. Graham's best finish was fourth place in the 1906 Open Championship. His other top finishes in the Open Championship were tied ninth in 1901 and tied seventh in 1904.

== Early life ==
Graham was born in Liverpool in 1877 to John and Mary Gilkison Graham.

== Golf career ==
=== 1901 Open Championship ===
The 1901 Open Championship was the 41st Open Championship, held 5–6 June at Muirfield in Gullane, East Lothian, Scotland. James Braid won the Championship, three strokes ahead of runner-up Harry Vardon. The Championship was a close contest between Braid, Vardon and J.H. Taylor with the leading amateur 11 strokes behind Braid and the next professional 16 strokes behind. Graham played steadily, posting rounds of 82-83-81-83=329 and finished tied for ninth place. He was playing as an amateur and therefore could not accept any prize money.

=== 1904 Open Championship ===
The 1904 Open Championship was the 44th Open Championship, held 8–10 June at Royal St George's Golf Club in Sandwich, England. Jack White won the Championship by a stroke from James Braid and J.H. Taylor. Graham maneuvered his way around the difficult Royal St George's course with rounds of 76-76-78-80=310 and finished in a tie for seventh place.

=== 1906 Open Championship ===
The 1906 Open Championship was the 46th Open Championship, held 13–15 June at Muirfield in Gullane, East Lothian, Scotland. Defending champion James Braid won the Championship for the third time, four strokes ahead of runner-up J.H. Taylor. There was no qualifying competition. All entries played 18 holes in pairs on the first two days with all those within 14 strokes of the leader making the cut and playing 36 holes on the final day.

The feature of the first day was the play of the amateurs. Graham led with a 71, while Robert Maxwell was amongst those tied for second on 73 with R. W. Whitecross and Hugh Watt, both from Dirleton Castle Golf Club, a further shot behind. Graham followed up his fine first round 71 with three much higher scoring rounds but still finished alone in fourth place. His rounds were 71-79-78-78=306.

== Death and legacy ==
Graham's career as an amateur golfer was cut short when he was killed on 16 June 1915 serving his country in France during World War I. He served with the 10th Bn., King's Regiment (Liverpool). He is buried at the Ypres Menin Gate Memorial, Ypres (Ieper), Arrondissement Ieper, West Flanders (West-Vlaanderen), Belgium. He is best remembered for having three top-10 finishes in the Open Championship.

== Results in major championships ==
Tournament	1897	1898	1899	1900	1901	1902	1903	1904	1905	1906	1907	1908	1909	1910	1911	1912	1913
The Open Championship	T18	DNP	DNP	DNP	T9	WD	DNP	T7 LA	WD	4 LA	T13 LA	T18	DNP	CUT	CUT	DNP	T11 LA

Note: Graham played only in The Open Championship.

CUT = missed the cut
WD = Withdrew
DNP = Did not play
"T" indicates a tie for a place
Yellow background for top-10

== Team appearances ==
- England–Scotland Amateur Match (representing Scotland): 1902 (winners), 1903, 1904 (winners), 1905 (winners), 1906 (winners), 1907 (winners), 1908 (winners), 1909 (winners), 1910, 1911 (winners)
- Coronation Match (representing the Amateurs): 1911
