= 1901 Open Championship =

Coordinates: 56.043°N 2.823°W

Tournament information
- Dates: 5–6 June 1901
- Location: Gullane, East Lothian, Scotland
- Course: Muirfield

Statistics
- Field: 100 players, 38 after cut
- Cut: 175
- Prize fund: £115
- Winner's share: £50

Champion
- (Scotland) James Braid
- 309

Location in Scotland

The 1901 Open Championship was the 41st Open Championship, held 5–6 June at Muirfield in Gullane, East Lothian, Scotland. James Braid won the Championship, three strokes ahead of runner-up Harry Vardon. The Championship was a close contest between Braid, Vardon and J.H. Taylor with the leading amateur 11 strokes behind Braid and the next professional 16 strokes behind.

All entries played 36 holes on the first day with all those within 19 strokes of the leader making the cut and playing 36 holes on the final day, with the additional provision that the final day's field had to contain at least 32 professionals.

In a strong wind, Vardon led after the first round with a 77 and followed this with a 78. At the end of the first day, he was joined on 155 by Braid. Taylor was next, seven shots behind with James Kinnell and Jack White a further two strokes back. Such was the dominance of Braid and Vardon that only 36 players (31 professionals and five amateurs) scored 174 or better and the cut was made at 175 to include 33 professionals.

After the third round, Braid was five shots clear of Vardon, with Taylor two further shots behind and the rest of the field a further eight strokes behind. With a clear lead, he played a cautious final round of 80. With Braid having finished his round, Vardon had a chance to tie if he could play the last three holes in level fours. However at the 16th he topped his second shot, put his third into a bunker and took six, ending his chances. Taylor finished third with amateur Harold Hilton a further seven strokes behind. If not for a brutal 89 in the first round, Hilton would have fared much better on the final leaderboard.

== First day leaderboard ==
Wednesday, 5 June 1901

Place	Player	Score
T1	(Scotland) James Braid	79-76=155
T1	(Jersey) Harry Vardon	77-78=155
3	(England) J.H. Taylor	79-83=162
T4	(Scotland) James Kinnell	79-85=164
T4	(Scotland) Jack White	82-82=164
T6	(Scotland) John Graham Jr. (a)	82-83=165
T6	(Scotland) Willie Park Jr.	78-87=165
T8	(Scotland) Charles Dalziel (a)	82-84=166
T8	(Scotland) Johnny Laidlay (a)	84-82=166
T10	(Jersey) Jack Gaudin	86-81=167
T10	(Scotland) Jim Hutchison	84-83=167
T10	(England) Rowland Jones	85-82=167
T10	(England) Alfred Lewis	85-82=167

== Final leaderboard ==
Thursday, 6 June 1901

Place	Player	Score	Money
1	(Scotland) James Braid	79-76-74-80=309	£50
2	(Jersey) Harry Vardon	77-78-79-78=312	£25
3	(England) J.H. Taylor	79-83-74-77=313	£15
4	(England) Harold Hilton (a)	89-80-75-76=320	−
5	(Scotland) Sandy Herd	87-81-81-76=325	£10
6	(Scotland) Jack White	82-82-80-82=326	£7 10s
T7	(Scotland) James Kinnell	79-85-86-78=328	£7 10s
T7	(Scotland) Johnny Laidlay (a)	84-82-82-80=328	−
T9	(Jersey) Phil Gaudin	86-81-86-76=329	0
T9	(Scotland) John Graham Jr. (a)	82-83-81-83=329	−
