= 1900 Open Championship =

Coordinates: 56.043°N 2.823°W

Tournament information
- Dates: 6–7 June 1900
- Location: St Andrews, Scotland
- Course: Old Course at St Andrews

Statistics
- Field: 81 players, 46 after cut
- Cut: 175
- Prize fund: £115
- Winner's share: £50

Champion
- (England) J.H. Taylor
- 309

Location in Scotland

The 1900 Open Championship was the 40th Open Championship, held 6–7 June at the Old Course at St Andrews, Fife, Scotland. J.H. Taylor won the Championship for the 3rd time, by eight strokes from runner-up Harry Vardon.

All entries played 36 holes on the first day with all those within 19 strokes of the leader making the cut and playing 36 holes on the final day, with the additional provision that the final day's field had to contain at least 32 professionals. The prize money for first place was increased from £30 to £50 while that for second place was increased from £20 to £25.

A strong breeze made scoring difficult on the first morning. Taylor together with Harry and Tom Vardon led with scores of 79. In the afternoon only Taylor, with a 77, broke 80. At the end of day, Taylor led on 156 followed by Harry Vardon on 160, Jack White on 161 and the amateur Robert Maxwell on 162. 46 players made the cut of 175.

Playing steadily, Taylor had a third round 78 to open up a six shot lead over Harry Vardon. Braid and White were a further three shots behind. He was even better in the afternoon, scoring 75, to win by eight strokes over Vardon and by 13 shots from the rest of the field. Taylor was the lowest or equal lowest scorer in each of the four rounds.

== First day leaderboard ==
Wednesday, 6 June 1900

Place	Player	Score
1	(England) J.H. Taylor	79-77=156
2	(Jersey) Harry Vardon	79-81=160
3	(Scotland) Jack White	80-81=161
4	(Scotland) Robert Maxwell (a)	81-81=162
T5	(Scotland) James Braid	82-81=163
T5	(Scotland) Willie Park Jr.	80-83=163
7	(Scotland) Ben Sayers	81-83=164
T8	(Scotland) James Kay	84-81=165
T8	(Scotland) Peter McEwan Jr.	85-80=165
T10	(Scotland) Willie Auchterlonie	81-85=166
T10	(Scotland) Sandy Herd	81-85=166
T10	(Jersey) Tom Vardon	79-87=166

== Final leaderboard ==
Thursday, 7 June 1900

Place	Player	Score	Money
1	(England) J.H. Taylor	79-77-78-75=309	£50
2	(Jersey) Harry Vardon	79-81-80-77=317	£25
3	(Scotland) James Braid	82-81-80-79=322	£15
4	(Scotland) Jack White	80-81-82-80=323	£10
5	(Scotland) Willie Auchterlonie	81-85-80-80=326	£7 10s
6	(Scotland) Willie Park Jr.	80-83-81-84=328	£7 10s
T7	(Scotland) Robert Maxwell (a)	81-81-86-81=329	−
T7	(Scotland) Archie Simpson	82-85-83-79=329	0
9	(Scotland) Ben Sayers	81-83-85-81=330	0
T10	(Scotland) Sandy Herd	81-85-81-84=331	0
T10	(Scotland) Andrew Kirkaldy	87-83-82-79=331	0
T10	(Jersey) Tom Vardon	79-87-84-81=331	0
