= 1902 Open Championship =

1902 golf tournament held at the Royal Liverpool Golf Club, Hoylake, Wirral, England

Coordinates: 53.385°N 3.190°W

Tournament information
- Dates: 4–5 June 1902
- Location: Hoylake, England
- Course: Royal Liverpool Golf Club

Statistics
- Field: 112 players, 45 after cut
- Cut: 168
- Prize fund: £115
- Winner's share: £50

Champion
- (Scotland) Sandy Herd
- 307

Location in England

The 1902 Open Championship was the 42nd Open Championship, held 4–5 June at Royal Liverpool Golf Club in Hoylake, England. Sandy Herd won the Championship, a stroke ahead of runners-up James Braid and Harry Vardon.

All entries played 36 holes on the first day with all those within 19 strokes of the leader making the cut and playing 36 holes on the final day, with the additional provision that the final day's field had to contain at least 32 professionals.

Vardon sliced his first two shots out of bounds at the 1st hole and took six, there being no penalty stroke for out of bounds at that time. However, he played the rest of the round so well that his score of 72 was four shots ahead of the second place Willie Fernie, the 1883 champion. Vardon again started badly in the afternoon but his 77 still gave him a four shot lead over Herd and Ted Ray. 45 players, including nine amateurs, made the cut on 168.

The next morning, Herd shot 73, four strokes better than anyone else. This gave him a three stroke lead over Vardon who had taken 80. Braid, J.H. Taylor and Tom Vardon were in third place, eight strokes behind Herd.

Herd started his final round well but took six at the 8th and 9th holes and then 5 at the short 11th. Another shot was dropped at the short 13th and he eventually finished in 81. Harry Vardon took six at the 3rd and 8th but then rallied and needed a four at the last to tie with Herd. However, he three putted to finish a shot behind. Braid was the final player with a change to match Herd. Reaching the turn in 40, the same as Herd, he need to come back in 33 to tie. He had a putt at the last to tie but missed to finish in a tie for second place with Vardon. The amateur Robert Maxwell matched Braid's 74 to finish in fourth place, the only player under 80 in all four rounds.

== First day leaderboard ==
Wednesday, 4 June 1902

Place	Player	Score
1	(Jersey) Harry Vardon	72-77=149
T2	(Scotland) Sandy Herd	77-76=153
T2	(Jersey) Ted Ray	79-74=153
4	(Scotland) James Braid	78-76=154
T5	(England) Harold Hilton (a)	79-76=155
T5	(Scotland) Andrew Kirkaldy	77-78=155
T7	(Scotland) Robert Maxwell (a)	79-77=156
T7	(Jersey) Tom Vardon	80-76=156
T9	(England) Sidney Fry (a)	78-79=157
T9	(England) Rowland Jones	79-78=157
T9	(England) Peter Rainford	78-79=157
T9	(England) Jack Rowe	79-78=157
T9	(England) J.H. Taylor	81-76=157
T9	(Scotland) Jack White	82-75=157

== Final leaderboard ==
Thursday, 5 June 1902

Place	Player	Score	Money
1	(Scotland) Sandy Herd	77-76-73-81=307	£50
T2	(Scotland) James Braid	78-76-80-74=308	£20
T2	(Jersey) Harry Vardon	72-77-80-79=308	£20
4	(Scotland) Robert Maxwell (a)	79-77-79-74=309	−
5	(Jersey) Tom Vardon	80-76-78-79=313	£10
T6	(England) Harold Hilton (a)	79-76-81-78=314	−
T6	(Scotland) James Kinnell	78-80-79-77=314	£7 10s
T6	(England) J.H. Taylor	81-76-77-80=314	£7 10s
9	(Jersey) Ted Ray	79-74-85-80=318	0
T10	(Scotland) Andrew Kirkaldy	77-78-83-82=320	0
T10	(France) Arnaud Massy	77-81-78-84=320	0
