= Edward Blackwell =

Scottish golfer

- Blackwell (center), Freddie Tait (left), and Old Tom Morris (right), at St Andrews, Scotland, playing in the 1899 R&A Order of Play Medal Match

Personal information
- Full name: Edward Baird Hay Blackwell
- Nationality: Scotland
- Born: 21 July 1866 St Andrews, Scotland
- Died: 22 June 1945 (aged 78) St Andrews, Scotland
- Height: 6 ft (183 cm)
- Weight: 196 lb (89 kg)

Career
- Sport: Golf
- Status: Amateur

Best results in major championships
- Masters Tournament: DNP
- PGA Championship: DNP
- U.S. Open: DNP
- The Open Championship: T13: 1892
- British Amateur: 2nd: 1904

Edward Baird Hay Blackwell (21 July 1866 – 22 June 1945) was a Scottish amateur golfer who played in the late 19th and early 20th century. He was a member of The Royal and Ancient Golf Club of St Andrews and finished in second place in the 1904 Amateur Championship contested at Royal St George's Golf Club in Sandwich, England. Although playing fine golf throughout, he eventually lost the final match to Walter Travis by the score of 4 and 3. He was known as a long hitter of the ball, often outdriving opponents by 50 yards or more. In 1898, Blackwell was described as probably the most consistently long driver the world had ever seen. As a result, his name became a household word among golfers.

His brothers—Sir Ernley Blackwell and Walter Blackwell—were also useful golfers, playing on several occasions in the Amateur Championship.

== Early life ==
Born in 1866—the son of Surgeon-Major James Hay Blackwell, H.E.I.C.S., and his wife, Eliza Jane Robertson—he began to play as soon as he could walk and the advantage of this early commencement was seen in his excellent playing style: a full, free swing, characterized by commanding power. His early boyhood was spent in St Andrews where he attended Dr. Browning's School. Before he left at age 13, he had won a prize with the score of 104. As a young man Blackwell had grown to a height of 6 feet, weighed 14 st (200 lb; 89 kg), and had powerful forearms and wrists. Being a tall man, he preferred heavy clubs with long hickory shafts. His cleek was once described as "a weaver's beam with an old boot at the end of it".

== 1904 Amateur championship ==
In the 1904 Amateur Championship, contested at Royal St George's Golf Club, Blackwell played well throughout the tournament but lost the final match 4 and 3 to the American player Walter Travis.

=== Details of play ===
The sky was overcast with occasional flurries of rain and a stiff, raw wind from the northeast greatly affected both Travis's and Blackwell's driving. The match was over 36 holes of golf.

Travis won the first 18-hole match by the score of 5 and 6. On starting the second round, Travis pulled his second shot into the rough and was bunkered on his third shot. Blackwell played his second shot into the same bunker and took two strokes to recover, but he won the hole in six to seven. Travis won the next but lost the third, where he failed at a 15-foot putt for a halve in three. The American, however, was four up at the fourth where Blackwell was weak on the green. After a good drive, a solid iron shot to the green, and a 30-foot putt for a birdie three at the fifth, Travis stood five up. He proceeded to win the sixth but lost the seventh. The eight was halved. Travis lost the ninth and made the turn four up. The next five holes were halved, Travis going somewhat off his long game, but saving holes on the greens. Travis became dormie four, halved the next and won 4 and 3.

After the match, Blackwell stated, "Travis is a great golfer. I was a trifle off my game during the morning and lost several holes I ought to have won".

== 1911 Open Championship ==
Blackwell was also a contestant in the 1911 Open Championship, which was the 51st Open Championship, held 26–30 June at Royal St George's Golf Club in Sandwich, England. British star Harry Vardon won the Championship for the fifth time after a playoff against the Frenchman Arnaud Massy. Blackwell led the first round scoring with a fine 71—with Michael Moran joined on 72 by J. H. Taylor—and finished tied for 21st.

== Results in major championships ==
Tournament	1892	1893	1894	1895	1896	1897	1898	1899	1900	1901	1902	1903	1904	1905	1906	1907	1908	1909	1910	1911	1912	1913	1914
The Open Championship	T13	DNP	DNP	DNP	DNP	DNP	36	DNP	DNP	DNP	DNP	DNP	T27	WD	DNP	DNP	DNP	DNP	WD	T21	DNP	41	DNP
The Amateur Championship	DNP	DNP	DNP	DNP	DNP	DNP	DNP	DNP	DNP	R128	R128	R32	2	QF	R32	QF	DNP	R64	R64	R128	R32	R64	R16

Tournament	1920	1921	1922	1923	1924	1925	1926	1927	1928	1929	1930
The Amateur Championship	R64	R16	DNP	R64	R256	R128	DNP	R128	DNP	R256	R128

Note: Blackwell played only in The Open Championship and The Amateur Championship.

DNP = Did not play
WD = Withdrew
"T" indicates a tie for a place
R256, R128, R64, R32, R16, QF, SF = Round in which player lost in match play
Yellow background for top-10

== Sources ==
Source for Open Championship: www.opengolf.com

Source for 1901 Amateur: The Glasgow Herald, 8 May 1901, pg. 8.

Source for 1902 Amateur: The Glasgow Herald, 30 Apr 1902, pg. 10.

Source for 1903 Amateur: The Glasgow Herald, 21 May 1903, pg. 13.

Source for 1905 Amateur: The Glasgow Herald, 26 May 1905, pg. 10.

Source for 1906 Amateur: The Glasgow Herald, 24 May 1906, pg. 8.

Source for 1907 Amateur: The Glasgow Herald, 31 May 1907, pg. 13.

Source for 1909 Amateur: The Glasgow Herald, 26 May 1909, pg. 14.

Source for 1910 Amateur: The Glasgow Herald, 1 Jun 1910, pg. 10.

Source for 1911 Amateur: The Glasgow Herald, 31 May 1911, pg. 10.

Source for 1912 Amateur: The American Golfer, July, 1912, pg. 199. Archived 24 February 2012 at the Wayback Machine

Source for 1913 Amateur: The Glasgow Herald, 28 May 1913, pg. 15.

Source for 1914 Amateur: The Glasgow Herald, 22 May 1914, pg. 14.

Source for 1920 Amateur: The American Golfer, June 19, 1920, pg. 9. Archived 8 March 2012 at the Wayback Machine

Source for 1921 Amateur: The American Golfer, June 4, 1921, pg. 24. Archived 16 June 2012 at the Wayback Machine

Source for 1923 Amateur: The Glasgow Herald, 10 May 1923, pg. 15.

Source for 1924 Amateur: The Glasgow Herald, 27 May 1924, pg. 3.

Source for 1925 Amateur: The Glasgow Herald, 26 May 1925, pg. 15.

Source for 1927 Amateur: The Glasgow Herald, 25 May 1927, pg. 4.

Source for 1929 Amateur: The Glasgow Herald, 12 Jun 1929, pg. 14.

Source for 1930 Amateur: The Glasgow Herald, 28 May 1930, pg. 4.

== Team appearances ==
- England–Scotland Amateur Match (representing Scotland): 1902 (winners), 1904 (winners), 1905 (winners), 1906 (winners), 1907 (winners), 1909 (winners), 1910, 1912 (winners), 1923 (winners), 1924, 1925
- Coronation Match (representing the Amateurs): 1911

== See also ==
- Players of the Period—Mr. Edward Blackwell
