= 1906 Open Championship =

Coordinates: 56.043°N 2.823°W

Tournament information
- Dates: 13–15 June 1906
- Location: Gullane, East Lothian, Scotland
- Course: Muirfield

Statistics
- Field: 181 players, 72 after cut
- Cut: 163
- Prize fund: £115
- Winner's share: £50

Champion
- (Scotland) James Braid
- 300

Location in Scotland
Location in East Lothian, Scotland

The 1906 Open Championship was the 46th Open Championship, held 13–15 June at Muirfield in Gullane, East Lothian, Scotland. Defending champion James Braid won the Championship for the third time, four strokes ahead of runner-up J.H. Taylor.

There was no qualifying competition. All entries played 18 holes in pairs on the first two days with all those within 14 strokes of the leader making the cut and playing 36 holes on the final day.

The feature of the opening round on Wednesday was the play of the amateurs. John Graham Jr. led with a 71, while Robert Maxwell was amongst those tied for second on 73 with Robert Whitecross and Hugh Watt, both from Dirleton Castle Golf Club, a further shot behind.

Taylor and Harry Vardon came to fore in the second round on Thursday. Taylor was out in 41 but came back in 31, despite three-putting the last. Vardon was only a shot worse with a 73. Taylor led on 149, with Vardon and Graham on 150; 72 players were within 14 shots of Taylor and made the cut.

Taylor's third round 75 on Friday morning was good enough for him to retain the lead by a stroke over Rowland Jones and three over Braid and Vardon. In the final round that afternoon, Jones scored a disappointing 83 to drop out of contention, while Taylor scored 80 and Vardon 78. Only two players bettered 77, Walter Toogood with a 71 and Braid with a 73, but Toogood was already out of the picture after an 83 in the morning. Needing a 76 for victory, Braid reached the turn in 38 and after more steady play he was left with two fives at the last two holes to win. A 45-foot (14 m) putt for a three at the 17th hole secured the victory.

== Round summaries ==
=== First round ===
Wednesday, 13 June 1906

Place	Player	Score
1	(Scotland) John Graham Jr. (a)	71
T2	(Scotland) George Duncan	73
T2	(England) Percy Hills	73
T2	(Scotland) Robert Maxwell (a)	73
T5	(England) Rowland Jones	74
T5	(Scotland) Robert Whitecross (a)	74
T5	(Scotland) Hugh Watt (a)	74
8	(Scotland) Ben Sayers Jr.	75
T9	(England) James Douglas Edgar	76
T9	(France) Arnaud Massy	76
T9	(Jersey) Thomas Renouf	76
T9	(Scotland) Robert Thomson	76
T9	(Jersey) Tom Vardon	76

=== Second round ===
Thursday, 14 June 1906

Place	Player	Score
1	(England) J.H. Taylor	77-72=149
T2	(Scotland) John Graham Jr. (a)	71-79=150
T2	(Jersey) Harry Vardon	77-73=150
T4	(Scotland) George Duncan	73-78=151
T4	(Scotland) Robert Maxwell (a)	73-78=151
6	(England) Rowland Jones	74-78=152
T7	(Scotland) James Braid	77-76=153
T7	(Jersey) Thomas Renouf	76-77=153
T9	(Jersey) Phil Gaudin	77-77=154
T9	(England) Ernest Gray	77-77=154
T9	(Scotland) David Kinnell	78-76=154
T9	(Scotland) Robert Thomson	76-78=154
T9	(England) Tom Williamson	77-77=154

=== Third round ===
Friday, 15 June 1906 (morning)

Place	Player	Score
1	(England) J.H. Taylor	77-72-75=224
2	(England) Rowland Jones	74-78-73=225
T3	(Scotland) James Braid	77-76-74=227
T3	(Jersey) Harry Vardon	77-73-77=227
T5	(Scotland) John Graham Jr. (a)	71-79-78=228
T5	(Scotland) Robert Maxwell (a)	73-78-77=228
7	(Jersey) Thomas Renouf	76-77-76=229
T8	(France) Arnaud Massy	76-80-76=232
T8	(England) Ernest Gray	77-77-78=232
T8	(England) Tom Williamson	77-77-78=232

=== Final round ===
Friday, 15 June 1906 (afternoon)

Place	Player	Score	Money (£)
1	(Scotland) James Braid	77-76-74-73=300	50
2	(England) J.H. Taylor	77-72-75-80=304	25
3	(Jersey) Harry Vardon	77-73-77-78=305	15
4	(Scotland) John Graham Jr. (a)	71-79-78-78=306	0
5	(England) Rowland Jones	74-78-73-83=308	10
6	(France) Arnaud Massy	76-80-76-78=310	7 10s
7	(Scotland) Robert Maxwell (a)	73-78-77-83=311	0
T8	(Scotland) George Duncan	73-78-83-78=312	2 10s
T8	(Jersey) Ted Ray	80-75-79-78=312	2 10s
T8	(Jersey) Thomas Renouf	76-77-76-83=312	2 10s
