= 1904 Open Championship =

Coordinates: 51.274°N 1.367°E

Tournament information
- Dates: 8–10 June 1904
- Location: Sandwich, England
- Course: Royal St George's Golf Club

Statistics
- Field: 144 players, 52 after cut
- Cut: 168
- Prize fund: £115
- Winner's share: £50

Champion
- (Scotland) Jack White
- 296

Location in England
Location in Kent. England

The 1904 Open Championship was the 44th Open Championship, held 8–10 June at Royal St George's Golf Club in Sandwich, England. Jack White won his only major title, one stroke ahead of runners-up James Braid and J.H. Taylor, both former champions.

For the first time, the Open was scheduled for three days; the final day remained at 36 holes, but the first two rounds were now over two days. Those within nineteen strokes of the leader made the 36-hole cut, with the additional provision that the final day's field had to contain at least 32 professionals.

The opening round on Wednesday was cold and windy, which led to some high scoring. Robert Thomson led with 75 after reaching the turn in 34. He was a shot ahead of amateur John Graham Jr. and Harry Vardon. It was less windy on Thursday for the second round, and Vardon led on 149, followed by Thomson on 151 and Graham on 152. James Sherlock set a new record for the Open with 71, while Willie Park Jr. scored 72; 52 players were within nineteen strokes of Vardon and made the cut at 168 or better.

Overnight rain and light winds made for some low scoring on Friday. Braid set a new Championship record with a 69 in the third round, reaching the turn in 31. White has the second best score with a 72. After the morning round, Braid led on 226 with White on 227; Vardon was at 228 after a disappointing 79.

White, one of the early starters in the afternoon, scored 69 for 296. Braid also played well but his 71 left him a shot behind. He holed a long putt at the 15th but a four at the short 16th left him too much to do. Taylor was the last player with a chance to catch White but needed a 67 to do so. Starting 3-3-2, he reached the turn in 32. However, like Braid, he took four at the 16th and also ended up a shot behind. His 68 was another new Open record. White's total of 296 was yet another, the first total under 300.

== Round summaries ==
=== First round ===
Wednesday, 8 June 1904

Place	Player	Score
1	(Scotland) Robert Thomson	75
T2	(Scotland) John Graham Jr. (a)	76
T2	(Jersey) Harry Vardon	76
T4	(Scotland) James Braid	77
T4	(England) J.H. Taylor	77
T4	(Jersey) Tom Vardon	77
7	(Scotland) Andrew Kirkaldy	78
T8	(England) George Coburn	79
T8	(Jersey) Phil Gaudin	79
T10	(Scotland) Robert Maxwell	80
T10	(Scotland) Ben Sayers	80
T10	(Scotland) Jack White	80

=== Second round ===
Thursday, 9 June 1904

Place	Player	Score
1	(Jersey) Harry Vardon	76-73=149
2	(Scotland) Robert Thomson	75-76=151
3	(Scotland) John Graham Jr. (a)	76-76=152
T4	(England) James Sherlock	83-71=154
T4	(Jersey) Tom Vardon	77-77=154
T6	(England) J.H. Taylor	77-78=155
T6	(Scotland) Jack White	80-75=155
8	(Scotland) Willie Park Jr.	84-72=156
T9	(Scotland) James Braid	77-80=157
T9	(Scotland) Andrew Kirkaldy	78-79=157

=== Third round ===
Friday, 10 June 1904 (morning)

Place	Player	Score
1	(Scotland) James Braid	77-80-69=226
2	(Scotland) Jack White	80-75-72=227
3	(Jersey) Harry Vardon	76-73-79=228
T4	(England) J.H. Taylor	77-78-74=229
T4	(Jersey) Tom Vardon	77-77-75=229
6	(Scotland) John Graham Jr. (a)	76-76-78=230
T7	(Scotland) Andrew Kirkaldy	78-79-74=231
T7	(Scotland) Robert Thomson	75-76-80=231
9	(England) James Sherlock	83-71-78=232
10	(England) Ernest Gray	84-77-74=235

=== Final round ===
Friday, 10 June 1904 (afternoon)

Place	Player	Score	Money (£)
1	(Scotland) Jack White	80-75-72-69=296	50
T2	(Scotland) James Braid	77-80-69-71=297	20
T2	(England) J.H. Taylor	77-78-74-68=297	20
4	(Jersey) Tom Vardon	77-77-75-72=301	10
5	(Jersey) Harry Vardon	76-73-79-74=302	7; 10s
6	(England) James Sherlock	83-71-78-77=309	7; 10s
T7	(Scotland) John Graham Jr. (a)	76-76-78-80=310	0
T7	(Scotland) Andrew Kirkaldy	78-79-74-79=310	0
9	(Scotland) Sandy Herd	84-76-76-75=311	0
T10	(Scotland) Robert Maxwell (a)	80-80-76-77=313	0
T10	(Scotland) Ben Sayers	80-80-76-77=313	0
