= Allan Macfie =

Scottish golfer

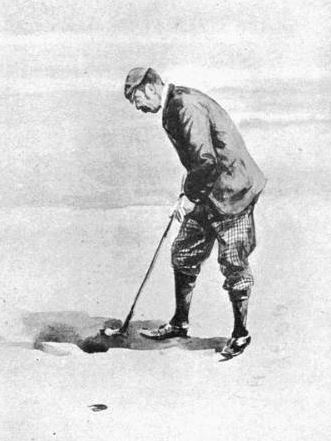
- A watercolor by T. Hodge of Macfie putting, c. 1886

Personal information
- Full name: Allan Fullarton Macfie
- Nationality: Scotland
- Born: 18 February 1854 Liverpool, England
- Died: 15 January 1943 (aged 88) St Andrews, Scotland
- Spouse: Isabel Rachel Tarbet

Career
- Sport: Golf
- Status: Amateur

Best results in major championships
- Masters Tournament: DNP
- PGA Championship: DNP
- U.S. Open: DNP
- The Open Championship: T18: 1888
- British Amateur: Won: 1885

Allan Fullarton Macfie (18 February 1854 – 15 January 1943) was a Scottish amateur golfer who played in the late 19th century. He won the first Amateur Championship in 1885.

== Early life and marriage ==
Macfie was born in Liverpool on 18 February 1854, the son of John and Lillias (née Fullarton). John was a senior partner in the Liverpool sugar refiners, Macfie and Sons. Macfie married but had no children.

== Golf career ==
=== 1885 Amateur Championship ===
==== Details of play ====
The 1885 event was organised by the Royal Liverpool Golf Club prior to the first official championship in 1886. It was, for many years, regarded as an unofficial championship but in 1922, the R&A decided that Macfie, the winner of the event, should be added to the list of Amateur Championship winners.

The tournament was played on 20, 21 and 23 April and was "open to all amateur members of recognised golf clubs". The format was match-play. All players were included in the draw for each round, any extra player receiving a bye. If a match was halved after the 18 holes both players progressed to the next round, playing each other again. There were 49 entries from 12 different clubs, although only 44 were included in the draw and four of these players did not turn up. Of the 22 first-round matches, 2 were halved, meaning that there were 12 matches in the second round. There were no more halved matches in the following rounds which meant that 3 players reached the semi-final stage.

In the first round Macfie halved his match against William Doleman. Under the rules Macfie and Doleman played each other again in the second round. This time Macfie was the comfortable winner. In the third round Macfie beat Thomas Gilroy 2&1 and then beat Walter de Zoete by 1 hole. Macfie was the lucky player to receive a bye at the semi-final stage with Horace Hutchinson beating Ball 2 up in the only semi-final match. After his morning round, Hutchinson played badly in the afternoon and Macfie won 7&6.

Each player paid a 1 guinea entry fee. This, together with 25 guineas from the Royal Liverpool club, was used for prizes. The losing finalist received £10 with the remainder being used to buy silver plate for the winner. The final amount for the winner was about £60 or £70. By comparison the winner of the 1885 Open Championship received £10.

=== Tournament wins ===
As well as winning the 1885 Amateur Championship, Macfie also won the Calcutta Cup in 1886, the Silver Cross in 1889 and 1893 and the Jubilee Vale in 1889 and 1898.

== Major championships ==
=== Amateur wins (1) ===
Year	Championship	Winning score	Runner-up
1885	The Amateur Championship	7 & 6	(England) Horace Hutchinson

=== Results timeline ===
Note: Macfie played in only The Open Championship and The Amateur Championship.

Tournament	1885	1886	1887	1888	1889
The Open Championship			T22	T18	
The Amateur Championship	1	R16		R64	QF

Tournament	1890	1891	1892	1893	1894	1895	1896	1897	1898	1899
The Open Championship		T34								
The Amateur Championship	R16	R32		R32	QF	R64		R64	R32	

Tournament	1900	1901	1902	1903	1904	1905	1906	1907
The Open Championship								
The Amateur Championship		R32						R32

Win
Top 10
Did not play

"T" indicates a tie for a place
R64, R32, R16, QF, SF = Round in which player lost in match play

== Death and legacy ==
Macfie died at his home, Brooklands, in St Andrews in 1943 aged 88. Macfie is best remembered for winning the first Amateur Championship in 1885.
