= Clifford Lingen =

English golfer

Personal information
- Full name: Charles Clifford Lingen
- Nationality: England
- Born: 26 November 1881 Wall, Staffordshire, England
- Died: 3 November 1907 (aged 25) London, England

Career
- Sport: Golf
- Status: Amateur

Best results in major championships
- Masters Tournament: DNP
- PGA Championship: DNP
- U.S. Open: DNP
- The Open Championship: DNP
- British Amateur: 2nd: 1906

Charles Clifford Lingen (26 November 1881 – 3 November 1907) was an English amateur golfer who played in the early 20th century. He was the losing finalist in the 1906 Amateur Championship.

== Family and early life ==
Lingen was born in Wall, Staffordshire in 1881, the son of Charles Nelson Lingen and Emily (née Radcliffe). He attended Repton School from 1896 to 1899.

== Golf career ==
Lingen started playing golf after leaving Repton. He was a member of the Sunningdale Golf Club and the Stock Exchange Golf Society.

Lingen first played in the Amateur Championship in 1904 but lost 7&6 in the first round. In 1905 he had a bye in the first round and then won three matches to reach the fifth round (last 16) before losing 3&1 to W. K. Whigham.

In 1906 at Royal Liverpool Golf Club he beat Herman de Zoete 4&3, Charles B. Macdonald 5&4, Henry Boyd 4&3, T. M. Turner 3&2, A. K. Hannay 1 up, J. Gordon Simpson 1up and E. A. Smirke 4&2 to reach the final.

He played James Robb in the 36-hole final. There was a strong breeze that increased during the day. It rained in the morning but was fine in the afternoon. Lingen started badly and lost the first 4 holes. He managed to halve the 5th with a 7-foot putt, despite being partly stymied by Robb's ball which was on the lip of the hole. Robb then played the next two holes badly and the deficit was reduced to 2 holes before Linden lost the 8th and 9th to be 4 down again. Both played better on the second nine and the round ended with Robb 4 holes ahead, despite scoring about 86 for the round. Although the play was bad in the morning, it was worse in the afternoon. Robb started 6-5-6 and increased his lead to 5, before Linden won the 5th.The Times reported that "The 6th is a very long story. Dead against a strong wind Mr. Lingen drove out of bounds, dropped another onto a bad lie on the tee, got a poor third, topped his fourth, and sliced his fifth into a bunker. On the other hand Mr. Robb drove against the fence, played his second backwards, reached some rushes with his third, played his fourth to square leg, almost into a ditch, his fifth into the garden, and his sixth into the rushes near the green. Eventually both were dead in 7. They both missed their putts and halved in 9." The Manchester Courier reported that the play at the hole "was the worst exhibition of golf that has probably ever been seen in a great match" while the "Yorkshire Post" noted that "the putting was extremely bad, and a half in nine caused some merriment to players and onlookers alike." The short 7th was halved in 5 after some "miserable putting" and the 8th was halved in 6. Linden managed to reduce the lead to 2 at the 12th but Robb won the next two and halved the 15th to win 4&3.

In 1907 he lost in the third round to P. L. Smith 3&1, having received a bye in the first round.

== Death ==
News of Lingen's illness was reported in October 1907. He died on 3 December at a nursing home in London, having contracted cancer and been confined to bed for 5 weeks. He had not been in the best of health at the Amateur Championship and had had an operation but later he "became seriously ill with an internal complaint" and there was no hope of recovery. He was buried at Nantmel, Powys.
