= Robert Maxwell (golfer) =

Scottish amateur golfer (1876–1949)

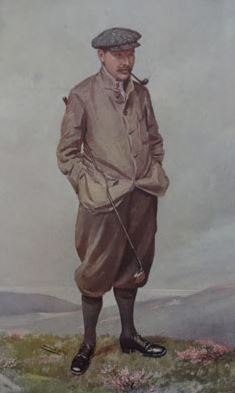
- 1906 caricature of Maxwell by Spy (from Vanity Fair magazine)

Personal information
- Nickname: Bobbie
- Nationality: Scotland
- Born: 12 May 1876 Edinburgh, Scotland
- Died: 25 July 1949 (aged 73) North Berwick, Scotland
- Height: 6 ft 2.5 in (1.89 m)
- Weight: 190 lb (86 kg; 14 st)

Career
- Sport: Golf
- Status: Amateur

Best results in major championships (wins: 2)
- Masters Tournament: DNP
- PGA Championship: DNP
- U.S. Open: DNP
- The Open Championship: 4th: 1902
- British Amateur: Won: 1903, 1909

Robert Maxwell (12 May 1876 – 25 July 1949) was a Scottish amateur golfer who played during the late 19th century and early 20th century. Maxwell had four top-10 finishes in The Open Championship. His best performance came in the 1902 Open Championship when he placed fourth. Maxwell won The Amateur Championship twice, in 1903 and 1909, both events having been played at Muirfield.

== Early life ==
Maxwell was born in Edinburgh, Scotland, on 12 May 1876. He was the son of Francis Maxwell and Adelaide Maxwell (née Hay). At age four, he was living in North Berwick, Scotland with his parents, two brothers, and a sister. He received his education at Eton College and was an energetic boy. While at Eton, he acquired a "short and concise" manner of speaking.

As a youth, he was adroit at football and rowing. By age seven, Maxwell had already honed his golf game and, thanks to golf lessons he had received from Ben Sayers, he carded a 74 in two rounds on the Ladies' Course at North Berwick. As a young man, he had powerful arms and wrists, a quick swing, and was a long hitter of the golf ball.

In 1909, Walter Travis, editor of The American Golfer magazine, described Maxwell as "... a big, tall, powerful man with massive proportions and a fine pair of legs under him. His style is rather forceful, and perhaps, as some would say, a trifle clumsy. He hits hard, but unlike many other hard hitters he is most wonderfully accurate. He employs an open stance ... and uses the Vardon grip with his right thumb down the shaft. With his irons he is wonderfully accurate ... and he uses an iron putter—and his style does not look as if it would make for delicacy, but he has an extraordinarily fine touch, and as a matter of fact he was about the best putter there was at Muirfield, hardly ever missing a short one."

== Golf career ==
Maxwell, the upstart youngster, first entered the Amateur Championship when he was only 21 years old. He made news in the 1897 tournament at Muirfield by beating John Ball, the 4-time (and later 8-time) Amateur champion, and also knocked off Harold Hilton.

In his match against Ball, Maxwell stymied the great champion on three of the first eight holes, and eventually finished him off by the score of 6 & 4. Maxwell finally fell victim himself when James Robb beat him 1 up in the fifth round.

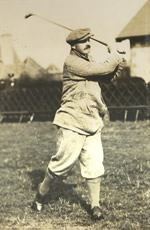
Maxwell at Muirfield, c. 1904

Known as "Bobbie" by his fans and those who knew him, Maxwell was skilled enough at golf by 1900 to begin winning tournaments. He notched three wins in the North Berwick club championship from 1902 to 1904. In 1903 he added the Amateur Championship to his list of tournament wins.

In total, he entered the British Amateur thirteen times and played in The Open Championship seven times between 1900 and 1909. Maxwell had nine caps for Scotland when he represented his country against England in international matches. In several of those matches he was paired against John Ball, crushing him on three occasions–once by 12 & 10 and twice by 8 & 6 margins of victory. He won the Glennie Medal at St Andrews three consecutive years from 1901 to 1903.

=== 1902 Open Championship ===
The 1902 Open Championship was held 4–5 June at Royal Liverpool Golf Club in Hoylake, England. Scottish professional Sandy Herd won the Championship, a stroke ahead of runners-up James Braid and Harry Vardon. Maxwell carded rounds of 79-77-79-74=309 and finished in fourth place, only two shots behind Herd. Maxwell was the only player in the tournament to score less than 80 in all four rounds.

=== 1903 Amateur Championship ===
Maxwell won the 1903 Amateur Championship, held at Muirfield, by the score of 7 & 5 over Horace Hutchinson. Maxwell made it into the final by first defeating Herman de Zoete on the 19th hole in the semi-final.

=== 1909 Amateur Championship ===
Muirfield was the host course once again for the Amateur Championship in 1909. Dressed in his normal brown tweeds and smoking his short, straight pipe—which he put into his pocket while still lit before hitting shots—Maxwell was in good form during the tournament and beat Cecil Hutchison 1 up in a closely contested match.

=== Retirement from tournament golf ===
He retired from tournament play at age 35 in 1911. Maxwell came out of retirement and played in the Amateur Championship one final time after World War I concluded, but it was largely a ceremonial appearance at Muirfield where he had so many fond memories of past success.

== Death and legacy ==
Maxwell died at his home in East Gribton, North Berwick, on 25 July 1949, aged 73. He is best remembered for winning the Amateur Championship twice, in 1903 and again in 1909. He also had four top-10 finishes in the Open Championship, including a superb fourth-place finish in 1902.

== Major championships ==
=== Amateur wins (2) ===
Year	Championship	Winning score	Runner-up
1903	The Amateur Championship	7 & 5	(England) Horace Hutchinson
1909	The Amateur Championship	1 up	(Scotland) Cecil Hutchison

=== Results timeline ===
Tournament	1897	1898	1899	1900	1901	1902	1903	1904	1905	1906	1907	1908	1909
The Open Championship				T7 LA		4 LA	T13 LA	T10 LA	CUT	7			13
The Amateur Championship	QF		QF	R32		SF	1	QF	QF	R128	R64		1

Tournament	1910	1911	1912	1913	1914	1915	1916	1917	1918	1919	1920
The Open Championship						NT	NT	NT	NT	NT	
The Amateur Championship	R256					NT	NT	NT	NT	NT	R128

Note: Maxwell only played in the Open Championship and the Amateur Championship.

Win
Top 10
Did not play

LA = Low amateur
NT = No tournament
CUT = missed the half-way cut
"T" indicates a tie for a place
R256, R128, R64, R32, R16, QF, SF = Round in which player lost in match play

Sources: The Open, 1897 Amateur, 1899 Amateur, 1902 Amateur, 1904 Amateur, 1905 Amateur, 1906 Amateur, 1907 Amateur, 1910 Amateur

== Team appearances ==
- England–Scotland Amateur Match (representing Scotland): 1902 (winners), 1903, 1904 (winners), 1905 (winners), 1906 (winners), 1907 (winners), 1909 (winners), 1910
