= The Amateur Championship =

Amateur golf tournament

- The Amateur Championship Trophy in 2009 at Gardagolf Country Club

Tournament information
- Location: United Kingdom
- Established: 1885
- Organized by: The R&A
- Format: Stroke play and match play
- Month played: June

Current champion
- (Republic of Ireland) Stuart Grehan

The Amateur Championship (sometimes referred to as the British Amateur or British Amateur Championship outside the UK) is a golf tournament which has been held annually in the United Kingdom since 1885 except during the two World Wars, and in 1949 and 2019 when Ireland hosted the championship. It is one of the two leading individual tournaments for amateur golfers, alongside the U.S. Amateur. It normally has the widest international representation of any individual amateur event, with 38 golf federations from all six continents represented in the 2018 championship.

Before World War II it was regarded as one of golf's major championships, but given the modern dominance of the sport by professional golfers, this is no longer the case. Two Amateur Championship winners in the post-World War II era have gone on to win professional major championships: José María Olazábal and Sergio García.

== History ==
The inaugural tournament was organised by the Royal Liverpool Golf Club in 1885. It was played on 20, 21 and 23 April and was "open to all amateur members of recognised golf clubs". The format was match-play. All players were included in the draw for each round, any extra player receiving a bye. If a match was halved after the 18 holes both players progressed to the next round, playing each other again. There were 49 entries from 12 different clubs, although only 44 were included in the draw and four of these players did not turn up. Of the 22 first-round matches, 2 were halved, meaning that there were 12 matches in the second round. There were no more halved matches in the following rounds which meant that 3 players reached the semi-final stage. John Ball beat his father, also called John, in the third round. Allan Macfie received a bye at the semi-final stage with Horace Hutchinson beating Ball 2 up in the only semi-final match. After his morning round, Hutchinson played badly in the afternoon and Macfie won 7&6. Each player paid a 1 guinea entry fee. This, together with 25 guineas from the Royal Liverpool club, was used for prizes. The losing finalist received £10 with the remainder being used to buy plate for the winner. The final amount for the winner was about £60 or £70. By comparison the winner of the 1885 Open Championship received £10. For many years the 1885 event was not regarded as the first Amateur Championship. It was only in 1922 that the Royal and Ancient Golf Club of St Andrews decided "to place on record the name of Mr. A. F. Macfie as the winner of the Amateur Championship of 1885".

Despite the unusual format of the 1885 event, it was regarded as a success. A meeting was arranged in 1886 where it was decided to start an amateur championship, to be held alternately at St Andrews, Hoylake and Prestwick. A number of clubs subscribed to buy a perpetual trophy for the championship. In addition, gold and silver medals were presented to the winner and runner-up, with bronze medals for the losing semi-finalists. The format became a simple knockout, with extra holes played in case of a tie after 18 holes. Otherwise the format remained the same as for the 1885 event. Because of the late arrangements the inaugural championship was not held until late September. With 42 entries, six rounds were needed which were completed in three days with the semi-finals and final on the last day. John Ball again lost in the semi-finals, 7&6 to Henry Lamb, but Lamb lost the final against Horace Hutchinson by the same score.

== Entry, format ==
Entry to the Championship is now given to the most-qualified 288 applicants from around the world, with perhaps half the places reserved for top players from the United Kingdom and Ireland. Qualifying rounds for all players were first introduced in 1983, when the popularity of the championship led to the number of applicants increasing to unmanageable levels. Major golf nations are allocated entries on what amounts to a quota basis for their top applicants, with each applicant's national federation cooperating with the R&A on selection. For example, the 2010 entry list included players from the British Isles (England, Wales, Scotland, Ireland, Northern Ireland), mainland Europe (France, Belgium, Netherlands, Germany, Italy, Spain, Portugal, Sweden, Norway, Finland, Denmark, Slovenia, Switzerland, Austria, Iceland), North America (USA, Canada, Mexico), South America (Argentina, Bolivia, Peru), Asia (China, India, South Korea, Japan, Singapore), Australasia (Australia, New Zealand) and Africa (South Africa).

The first stage of the Championship involves 288 players, each of whom plays two rounds of 18 holes, one on each of two courses, over the first two days. The 64 lowest scores over the 36 holes, and ties for 64th place compete in the match play stage of the Championship, on the event's principal course, and are seeded by qualifying scores. Each match consists of one round of 18 holes, except for the Final, which is over 36 holes. Since there are generally more than 64 qualifiers from the stroke play stage, the first round of the match play involves a small number of matches to reduce the number of qualifiers to exactly 64. In 2024 exactly 64 players qualified, ties for the final places being decided by a sudden-death playoff. Tied matches are broken by sudden death over extra holes. The event is played in June, normally with a Monday to Saturday schedule.

The winner receives invitations to three of the major championships, namely the following month's Open Championship, and the following year's Masters Tournament and U.S. Open, provided he remain an amateur prior to each major. The Amateur Championship is open to amateur golfers of any nationality in good standing with their national federations. Briton John Ball won the most career titles, with eight. Ball was still competing in the event as late as 1921 at Royal Liverpool Golf Club. In modern times, Briton Michael Bonallack's five titles lead. The most famous American winner of the competition was Bobby Jones, whose 1930 victory was part of his Grand Slam.

== Results ==
Year	Winner	Score	Runner-up	Semi-finalists	Venue	Ref.
2026	(Republic of Ireland) Stuart Grehan	1 up	(United States) Matthew Moloney	(Estonia) Richard Teder, (Germany) Emil Riegger	Royal Liverpool	
2025	(United States) Ethan Fang	1 up	(Republic of Ireland) Gavin Tiernan	(Finland) Veikka Viskari, (Italy) Riccardo Fantinelli	Royal St George's	
2024	(Denmark) Jacob Skov Olesen	4 & 3	(England) Dominic Clemons	(England) Jack Bigham, (United States) Luke Sample	Ballyliffin	
2023	(South Africa) Christo Lamprecht	3 & 2	(Switzerland) Ronan Kleu	(Thailand) Ratchanon Chantananuwat, (England) Frank Kennedy	Hillside	
2022	(South Africa) Aldrich Potgieter	3 & 2	(England) Sam Bairstow	(England) John Gough, (Republic of Ireland) Alex Maguire	Royal Lytham & St Annes	
2021	(England) Laird Shepherd	38 holes	(England) Monty Scowsill	(Wales) James Ashfield, (England) Jack Dyer	Nairn	
2020	(England) Joe Long	4 & 3	(England) Joe Harvey	(England) Jake Bolton, (Republic of Ireland) Mark Power	Royal Birkdale	
2019	(Republic of Ireland) James Sugrue	2 up	(Scotland) Euan Walker	(England) Ben Jones, (Australia) David Micheluzzi	Portmarnock	
2018	(South Africa) Jovan Rebula	3 & 2	(Republic of Ireland) Robin Dawson	(Republic of Ireland) Conor Purcell, (England) Mitch Waite	Royal Aberdeen	
2017	(England) Harry Ellis	38 holes	(Australia) Dylan Perry	(Italy) Luca Cianchetti, (Argentina) Alejandro Tosti	Royal St George's	
2016	(England) Scott Gregory	2 & 1	(Scotland) Robert MacIntyre	(Republic of Ireland) Paul McBride, (Poland) Adrian Meronk	Royal Porthcawl	
2015	(France) Romain Langasque	4 & 2	(Scotland) Grant Forrest	(France) Alexandre Daydou, (Scotland) Jack McDonald	Carnoustie	
2014	(Scotland) Bradley Neil	2 & 1	(South Africa) Zander Lombard	(Scotland) Connor Syme, (England) Sean Towndrow	Royal Portrush	
2013	(England) Garrick Porteous	6 & 5	(Finland) Toni Hakula	(United States) Jim Liu, (England) Max Orrin	Royal Cinque Ports	
2012	(Northern Ireland) Alan Dunbar	1 up	(Austria) Matthias Schwab	(Scotland) Paul Ferrier, (Scotland) Jack McDonald	Royal Troon	
2011	(Australia) Bryden Macpherson	3 & 2	(Scotland) Michael Stewart	(France) Sébastien Gros, (Scotland) Greg Paterson	Hillside	
2010	(South Korea) Jin Jeong	5 & 4	(Scotland) James Byrne	(England) Matthew Nixon, (England) Chris Paisley	Muirfield	
2009	(Italy) Matteo Manassero	4 & 3	(England) Sam Hutsby	(England) Stiggy Hodgson, (England) Darren Renwick	Formby	
2008	(Netherlands) Reinier Saxton	3 & 2	(England) Tommy Fleetwood	(England) Andy Sullivan, (Wales) Joe Vickery	Turnberry	
2007	(United States) Drew Weaver	2 & 1	(Australia) Tim Stewart	(Scotland) Callum Macaulay, (Wales) Jason Shufflebotham	Royal Lytham & St Annes	
2006	(France) Julien Guerrier	4 & 3	(England) Adam Gee	(United States) Mitchell Brown, (England) Jamie Moul	Royal St George's	
2005	(Republic of Ireland) Brian McElhinney	5 & 4	(Scotland) John Gallagher	(England) Oliver Fisher, (Scotland) Lloyd Saltman	Royal Birkdale	
2004	(Scotland) Stuart Wilson	4 & 3	(England) Lee Corfield	(Scotland) Eric Ramsay, (United States) Andrew Svoboda	St Andrews Links	
2003	(England) Gary Wolstenholme (2)	6 & 5	(Switzerland) Raphaël De Sousa	(Italy) Francesco Molinari, (Scotland) Eric Ramsay	Royal Troon	
2002	(Spain) Alejandro Larrazábal	1 up	(England) Martin Sell	(England) Jamie Elson, (Scotland) Graham Gordon	Royal Porthcawl	
2001	(Northern Ireland) Michael Hoey	1 up	(Wales) Ian Campbell	(England) Stuart Davis, (Scotland) Simon Mackenzie	Prestwick	
2000	(Finland) Mikko Ilonen	2 & 1	(Germany) Christian Reimbold	(England) David Ryles, (Australia) Andrew Webster	Royal Liverpool	
1999	(England) Graeme Storm	7 & 6	(England) Aran Wainwright	(Wales) Ian Campbell, (England) Richard McEvoy	Royal County Down	
1998	(Spain) Sergio García	7 & 6	(Wales) Craig Williams	(England) Mark Hilton, (England) Ben Mason	Muirfield	
1997	(Scotland) Craig Watson	3 & 2	(South Africa) Trevor Immelman	(England) Colin Edwards, (England) David Griffiths	Royal St George's	
1996	(England) Warren Bladon	1 up	(Scotland) Roger Beames	(United States) Steve Bodenheimer, (England) Robert Wiggins	Turnberry	
1995	(Scotland) Gordon Sherry	7 & 6	(England) Michael Reynard	(Republic of Ireland) Jody Fanagan, (Scotland) Roger Beames	Royal Liverpool	
1994	(England) Lee S. James	2 & 1	(Scotland) Gordon Sherry	(Sweden) Kalle Brink, (Scotland) Allan Turnbull	Nairn	
1993	(England) Iain Pyman	37 holes	(England) Paul Page	(Northern Ireland) Neil Anderson, (England) Raymond Russell	Royal Portrush	
1992	(Scotland) Stephen Dundas	7 & 6	(Wales) Bradley Dredge	(Scotland) Stephen Gallacher, (England) Matt Stanford	Carnoustie	
1991	(England) Gary Wolstenholme	8 & 6	(United States) Bob May	(Scotland) Wilson Bryson, (United States) David Duval	Ganton	
1990	(Netherlands) Rolf Muntz	7 & 6	(Wales) Michael Macara	(England) Craig Cassells, (Wales) Richard Johnson	Muirfield	
1989	(Wales) Stephen Dodd	5 & 3	(England) Craig Cassells	(Australia) Stephen McCraw, (Northern Ireland) Garth McGimpsey	Royal Birkdale	
1988	(Sweden) Cristian Härdin	1 up	(South Africa) Ben Fouchee	(England) Nigel Graves, (England) Carl Suneson	Royal Porthcawl	
1987	(Wales) Paul Mayo	3 & 1	(England) Peter McEvoy	(England) Russell Claydon, (United States) Len Mattiace	Prestwick	
1986	(England) David Curry	11 & 9	(England) Geoff Birtwell	(England) Peter McEvoy, (Scotland) Bryan Shields	Royal Lytham & St Annes	
1985	(Northern Ireland) Garth McGimpsey	8 & 7	(England) Graham Homewood	(England) Patrick Hall, (Scotland) David James	Royal Dornoch	
1984	(Spain) José María Olazábal	5 & 4	(Scotland) Colin Montgomerie	(England) David Curry, (England) David Gilford	Formby	
1983	(Wales) Philip Parkin	5 & 4	(United States) Jim Holtgrieve	(England) Peter Deeble, (England) Stephen Keppler	Turnberry	
1982	(England) Martin Thompson	4 & 3	(England) Andy Stubbs	(England) Peter Hedges, (Wales) Philip Parkin	Royal Cinque Ports	
1981	(France) Philippe Ploujoux	4 & 2	(United States) Joel Hirsch	(Republic of Ireland) John Carr, (Australia) Tony Gresham	St Andrews Links	
1980	(Wales) Duncan Evans	4 & 3	(South Africa) David Suddards	(South Africa) Duncan Lindsay-Smith, (Republic of Ireland) Arthur Pierse	Royal Porthcawl	
1979	(United States) Jay Sigel	3 & 2	(United States) Scott Hoch	(Australia) Tony Gresham, (Canada) Doug Roxburgh	Hillside	
1978	(England) Peter McEvoy (2)	4 & 3	(Scotland) Paul McKellar	(England) John Davies, (South Africa) David Suddards	Royal Troon	
1977	(England) Peter McEvoy	5 & 4	(Scotland) Hugh Campbell	(England) Michael Bonallack, (Scotland) Paul McKellar	Ganton	
1976	(United States) Dick Siderowf (2)	37 holes	(England) John Davies	(England) Allan Brodie, (Scotland) Iain Carslaw	St Andrews Links	
1975	(United States) Vinny Giles	8 & 7	(England) Mark James	(England) Geoff Marks, (United States) Dick Siderowf	Royal Liverpool	
1974	(England) Trevor Homer (2)	2 up	(United States) Jim Gabrielsen	(England) Martin Poxon, (Scotland) Hugh Stuart	Muirfield	
1973	(United States) Dick Siderowf	5 & 3	(England) Peter Moody	(England) Harry Ashby, (Scotland) Howard Clark	Royal Porthcawl	
1972	(England) Trevor Homer	4 & 3	(England) Alan Thirlwell	(England) Michael Bonallack, (England) Roger Revell	Royal St George's	
1971	(United States) Steve Melnyk	3 & 2	(United States) Jim Simons	(United States) Tom Kite, (England) Peter Moody	Carnoustie	
1970	(England) Michael Bonallack (5)	8 & 7	(United States) Bill Hyndman	(England) Bruce Critchley, (Northern Ireland) Brian Hoey	Royal County Down	
1969	(England) Michael Bonallack (4)	3 & 2	(United States) Bill Hyndman	(Scotland) Bill Davidson, (South Africa) Dale Hayes	Royal Liverpool	
1968	(England) Michael Bonallack (3)	7 & 6	(Republic of Ireland) Joe Carr	(England) Reg Glading, (England) Geoff Marks	Troon	
1967	(United States) Bob Dickson	2 & 1	(United States) Ron Cerrudo	(England) Gordon Clark, (United States) Marty Fleckman	Formby	
1966	(South Africa) Bobby Cole	3 & 2 (Note: The final was reduced to 18 holes after mist had caused a delayed start on the Thursday and only one round was played on that day rather than the two planned.)	(Scotland) Ronnie Shade	(Scotland) Gordon Cosh, (France) Henri de Lamaze	Carnoustie	
1965	(England) Michael Bonallack (2)	2 & 1	(England) Clive Clark	(England) Martin Christmas, (England) Rodney Foster	Royal Porthcawl	
1964	(England) Gordon Clark	39 holes	(England) Michael Lunt	(England) Martin Christmas, (England) John Hall	Ganton	
1963	(England) Michael Lunt	2 & 1	(England) John Blackwell	(United States) Ron Luceti, (United States) Ed Updegraff	St Andrews Links	
1962	(United States) Richard Davies	1 up	(Wales) John Povall	(England) Brian Chapman, (England) Rodney Foster	Royal Liverpool	
1961	(England) Michael Bonallack	6 & 4	(Scotland) James Walker	(England) Martin Christmas, (United States) Ralph Morrow	Turnberry	
1960	(Republic of Ireland) Joe Carr (3)	8 & 7	(United States) Bob Cochran	(England) Gordon Huddy, (Scotland) James Walker (Note: The semi-finals were played over 36 holes.)	Royal Portrush	
1959	(United States) Deane Beman	3 & 2	(United States) Bill Hyndman	(United States) Bob Magee, (England) Guy Wolstenholme	Royal St George's	
1958	(Republic of Ireland) Joe Carr (2)	3 & 2	(England) Alan Thirlwell	(England) Michael Bonallack, (United States) Tim Holland	St Andrews Links	
1957	(Scotland) Reid Jack	2 & 1	(United States) Harold Ridgley	(Scotland) Alan Bussell, (South Africa) Arthur Walker	Formby	
1956	(England) John Beharrell	5 & 4	(Scotland) Leslie Taylor	(Scotland) George Henderson, (Scotland) Reid Jack	Troon	
1955	(United States) Joe Conrad	3 & 2	(England) Alan Slater	(England) Arthur Perowne, (England) Philip Scrutton	Royal Lytham & St Annes	
1954	(Australia) Doug Bachli	2 & 1	(United States) William C. Campbell	(Republic of Ireland) Joe Carr, (England) Tony Slark	Muirfield	
1953	(Republic of Ireland) Joe Carr	2 up	(United States) Harvie Ward	(Northern Ireland) Cecil Beamish, (England) Arthur Perowne	Royal Liverpool	
1952	(United States) Harvie Ward	6 & 5	(United States) Frank Stranahan	(Republic of Ireland) Joe Carr, (Scotland) Robin Cater	Prestwick	
1951	(United States) Dick Chapman	5 & 4	(United States) Charles Coe	(Republic of Ireland) Joe Carr, (Wales) Albert Evans	Royal Porthcawl	
1950	(United States) Frank Stranahan (2)	8 & 6	(United States) Dick Chapman	(United States) Jim McHale Jr., (England) Cyril Tolley	St Andrews Links	
1949	(Northern Ireland) Max McCready	2 & 1	(United States) Willie Turnesa	(England) Bunny Millward, (England) Ken Thom	Portmarnock	
1948	(United States) Frank Stranahan	5 & 4	(England) Charlie Stowe	(England) Dennis Martin, (United States) Willie Turnesa	Royal St George's	
1947	(United States) Willie Turnesa	3 & 2	(United States) Dick Chapman	(Scotland) John Campbell, (Scotland) Sam McKinlay	Carnoustie	
1946	(Republic of Ireland) Jimmy Bruen	4 & 3	(United States) Robert Sweeny Jr.	(England) Gerald Micklem, (England) Harry Walker	Royal Birkdale	
1940–1945: Not played due to World War II
1939	(Scotland) Alex Kyle	2 & 1	(Wales) Tony Duncan	(United States) William Holt, (England) Charlie Stowe	Royal Liverpool	
1938	(United States) Charlie Yates	3 & 2	(Republic of Ireland) Cecil Ewing	(Canada) Ross Somerville, (Scotland) Hector Thomson	Troon	
1937	(United States) Robert Sweeny Jr.	3 & 2	(Northern Ireland) Lionel Munn	(England) Alaric de Bendern, (England) Charlie Stowe	Royal St George's	
1936	(Scotland) Hector Thomson	2 up	(Australia) Jim Ferrier	(Republic of Ireland) Cecil Ewing, (England) Alec Hill	St Andrews Links	
1935	(United States) Lawson Little (2)	1 up	(England) William Tweddell	(United States) Robert Sweeny Jr., (Scotland) Tony Torrance	Royal Lytham & St Annes	
1934	(United States) Lawson Little	14 & 13	(Scotland) James Wallace	(United States) George Dunlap, (England) Leslie Garnett	Prestwick	
1933	(England) Michael Scott	4 & 3	(England) Dale Bourn	(United States) George Dunlap, (England) Cyril Tolley	Royal Liverpool	
1932	(England) John de Forest	3 & 1	(England) Eric Fiddian	(Scotland) Eric McRuvie, (Northern Ireland) Lionel Munn	Muirfield	
1931	(England) Eric Martin Smith	1 up	(England) John de Forest	(Republic of Ireland) John MacCormack, (Scotland) William Tulloch	Royal North Devon	
1930	(United States) Bobby Jones	7 & 6	(England) Roger Wethered	(England) Lister Hartley, (United States) George Voigt	St Andrews Links	
1929	(England) Cyril Tolley (2)	4 & 3	(Scotland) John Nelson Smith	(United States) John Dawson, (England) Rex Hartley	Royal St George's	
1928	(England) Philip Perkins	6 & 4	(England) Roger Wethered	(United States) John Dawson, (England) Edward Tipping	Prestwick	
1927	(England) William Tweddell	7 & 6	(England) Eustace Landale	(Scotland) R H Jobson, (England) Roger Wethered	Royal Liverpool	
1926	(United States) Jess Sweetser	6 & 5	(Scotland) Fred Simpson	(Northern Ireland) William Brownlow, (Scotland) Andrew Jamieson Jr.	Muirfield	
1925	(Scotland) Robert Harris	13 & 12	(England) Kenneth Fradgley	(England) Ronald Hardman, (England) Noel Layton	Royal North Devon	
1924	(England) Ernest Holderness (2)	3 & 2	(England) Eustace Storey	(Scotland) William Murray, (England) Roger Wethered	St Andrews Links	
1923	(England) Roger Wethered	7 & 6	(Scotland) Robert Harris	(United States) Douglas Grant, (United States) Francis Ouimet	Royal Cinque Ports	
1922	(England) Ernest Holderness	1 up	(Scotland) John Caven	(Scotland) Willie Hunter, (Scotland) Robert Scott Jr.	Prestwick	
1921	(Scotland) Willie Hunter	12 & 11	(Scotland) Allan Graham	(England) Bernard Darwin, (England) Henry Tubbs	Royal Liverpool	
1920	(England) Cyril Tolley	37 holes	(United States) Robert A. Gardner	(England) Gustav Mellin, (England) Michael Scott	Muirfield	
1915–1919: Not played due to World War I
1914	(Scotland) James Jenkins	3 & 2	(Ireland) Charles Hezlet	(England) Robert Humphries, (England) Everard Martin Smith	Royal St George's	
1913	(England) Harold Hilton (4)	6 & 5	(Scotland) Robert Harris	(England) Colin Aylmer, (Scotland) Edward Kyle	St Andrews Links	
1912	(England) John Ball (8)	38 holes	(England) Abe Mitchell	(England) Angus Hambro, (Scotland) Charles Macfarlane	Royal North Devon	
1911	(England) Harold Hilton (3)	4 & 3	(England) Edward Lassen	(Scotland) Gordon Lockhart, (England) Leicester Stevens	Prestwick	
1910	(England) John Ball (7)	10 & 9	(England) Colin Aylmer	(England) Harold Hilton, (England) Abe Mitchell	Royal Liverpool	
1909	(Scotland) Robert Maxwell (2)	1 up	(Scotland) Cecil Hutchison	(Scotland) Robert Andrew, (England) Bernard Darwin	Muirfield	
1908	(England) Edward Lassen	7 & 6	(England) Herbert Taylor	(Scotland) Charles Dick, (Scotland) John Graham Jr.	Royal St George's	
1907	(England) John Ball (6)	6 & 4	(England) Charles Palmer	(Scotland) Guy Campbell, (Scotland) Robert Harris	St Andrews Links	
1906	(Scotland) James Robb	4 & 3	(England) Clifford Lingen	(England) Harry Colt, (England) Edward Smirke	Royal Liverpool	
1905	(England) Gordon Barry	3 & 2	(England) Osmund Scott	(Scotland) Archibald Aitken, (Scotland) John Graham Jr.	Prestwick	
1904	(United States) Walter Travis	4 & 3	(Scotland) Edward Blackwell	(England) Horace Hutchinson, (Scotland) Johnny Laidlay	Royal St George's	
1903	(Scotland) Robert Maxwell	7 & 5	(England) Horace Hutchinson	(England) Herman de Zoete, (Scotland) Angus MacDonald	Muirfield	
1902	(England) Charles Hutchings	1 up	(England) Sidney Fry	(Scotland) Robert Maxwell, (Scotland) James Robb	Royal Liverpool	
1901	(England) Harold Hilton (2)	1 up	(Scotland) John L. Low	(Scotland) John Graham Jr., (England) Horace Hutchinson	St Andrews Links	
1900	(England) Harold Hilton	8 & 7	(Scotland) James Robb	(England) Johnnie Bramston, (Scotland) John Graham Jr.	Royal St George's	
1899	(England) John Ball (5)	37 holes	(Scotland) Freddie Tait	(Scotland) Gilbert Whigham, (Scotland) John Williamson	Prestwick	
1898	(Scotland) Freddie Tait (2)	7 & 5	(Scotland) Samuel Mure Fergusson	(Scotland) John L. Low, (Scotland) James Robb	Royal Liverpool	
1897	(Scotland) Jack Allan	4 & 2	(Scotland) James Robb	(Scotland) Leslie Balfour-Melville, (Scotland) John L. Low	Muirfield	
1896	(Scotland) Freddie Tait	8 & 7	(England) Harold Hilton	(Scotland) John Graham Jr., (England) Horace Hutchinson	Royal St George's	
1895	(Scotland) Leslie Balfour-Melville	19 holes (Note: Finals from 1885 to 1895 were played over 18 holes.)	(England) John Ball	(Scotland) Laurie Auchterlonie, (Scotland) Freddie Tait	St Andrews Links	
1894	(England) John Ball (4)	1 up	(Scotland) Samuel Mure Fergusson	(Scotland) Johnny Laidlay, (Scotland) Freddie Tait	Royal Liverpool	
1893	(Scotland) P.C. Anderson	1 up	(Scotland) Johnny Laidlay	(Scotland) Samuel Mure Fergusson, (Scotland) Freddie Tait	Prestwick	
1892	(England) John Ball (3)	3 & 1	(England) Harold Hilton	(Scotland) Leslie Balfour, (Scotland) Johnny Laidlay	Royal St George's	
1891	(Scotland) Johnny Laidlay (2)	20 holes	(England) Harold Hilton	(Scotland) William Ballingall, (Ireland) Thomas Gilroy	St Andrews Links	
1890	(England) John Ball (2)	4 & 3	(Scotland) Johnny Laidlay	(Scotland) Leslie Balfour, (Scotland) David Leitch	Royal Liverpool	
1889	(Scotland) Johnny Laidlay	2 & 1	(Scotland) Leslie Balfour	(England) John Ball, (Scotland) William S. Wilson	St Andrews Links	
1888	(England) John Ball	5 & 4	(Scotland) Johnny Laidlay	(Scotland) Leslie Balfour, (Scotland) Alexander Stuart	Prestwick	
1887	(England) Horace Hutchinson (2)	1 up	(England) John Ball	(England) John Ball Sr., (Scotland) John Guthrie Tait	Royal Liverpool	
1886	(England) Horace Hutchinson	7 & 6	(England) Henry Lamb	(England) John Ball, (Scotland) Charles Chambers	St Andrews Links	
1885	(Scotland) Allan Macfie	7 & 6	(England) Horace Hutchinson	(England) John Ball (Note: There was only one semi-final, Macfie receiving a bye to the final.)	Royal Liverpool	

=== Multiple winners ===
Sixteen players have won more than one Amateur Championship, as of 2025:

- 8 wins: John Ball
- 5 wins: Michael Bonallack
- 4 wins: Harold Hilton
- 3 wins: Joe Carr
- 2 wins: Horace Hutchinson, Johnny Laidlay, Freddie Tait, Robert Maxwell, Ernest Holderness, Cyril Tolley, Lawson Little, Frank Stranahan, Trevor Homer, Dick Siderowf, Peter McEvoy, Gary Wolstenholme

Three players have won both the Amateur and the Open Championship:

- John Ball – 1888, 1890, 1892, 1894, 1899, 1907, 1910, 1912 Amateurs; 1890 Open
- Harold Hilton – 1900, 1901, 1911, 1913 Amateurs; 1892, 1897 Opens
- Bobby Jones – 1930 Amateur; 1926, 1927, 1930 Opens

== Stroke-play qualifying ==
Stroke-play qualifying was introduced in 1983. 36 holes are played, using two courses, with the leading 64 and ties advancing to the match-play stage. From 1983 to 1985 exactly 64 players qualified, ties for the final places being decided on countback. In 2020 qualifying was reduced to one round. In 2024 exactly 64 players qualified, ties for the final places being decided by a sudden-death playoff. The leading qualifiers are given below:

- 1983 Philip Parkin (140)
- 1984 Philip Parkin (141)
- 1985 Dana Banke (137)
- 1986 Dana Banke (142)
- 1987 Andrew Hare (136)
- 1988 Stephen Dodd+, Liam McNamara (145)
- 1989 Jim Milligan (141)
- 1990 Adam Hart (138)
- 1991 Fredrik Andersson, David Duval+ (141)
- 1992 Michael Welch (148)
- 1993 Craig Watson (141)
- 1994 Stephen Gallacher (145)
- 1995 Gary Clark (139)
- 1996 Warren Bladon+, Jody Fanagan (138)
- 1997 Matt Carver (145)
- 1998 Mark Hilton (137)
- 1999 Simon Dyson (139)
- 2000 Tim Rice+, Michael Thannhäuser (139)
- 2001 Nick Dougherty (135)
- 2002 Richard Finch (137)
- 2003 David Inglis (134)
- 2004 James Heath+, Kevin McAlpine (135)
- 2005 Damian Ulrich (135)
- 2006 Llewellyn Matthews (142)
- 2007 David Horsey (132)
- 2008 Sam Hutsby (139)
- 2009 Matteo Manassero (135)
- 2010 Tommy Fleetwood (135)
- 2011 Greg Eason (139)
- 2012 Daniel Jennevret (136)
- 2013 Craig Hinton, Adrian Meronk+ (140)
- 2014 Dan Brown (133)
- 2015 Ryan Chisnall, Craig Howie+ (135)
- 2016 Connor Syme (136)
- 2017 Caolan Rafferty (132)
- 2018 Wilco Nienaber (133)
- 2019 John Axelsen, Thomas Plumb+ (139)
- 2020 Ruben Lindsay (67)
- 2021 Matthew Clark (134)
- 2022 Jonathan Broomhead+, Barclay Brown (135)
- 2023 Ben Van Wyk (132)
- 2024 Connor Graham (136)
- 2025 Connor Graham (133)
- 2026 Wilhelm Ryding (135)

+ Number one seed. If two or more players are tied, the seeding is decided on countback using the combined scores on the last 9 holes of both qualifying rounds.

== Host courses ==
The Amateur has been played at the following courses, listed in order of number of tournaments hosted (as of 2026):

- 19 Royal Liverpool Golf Club
- 16 St Andrews Links
- 15 Royal St George's Golf Club
- 11 Prestwick Golf Club
- 11 Muirfield
- 7 Royal Porthcawl Golf Club
- 6 Royal Troon Golf Club
- 5 Carnoustie Golf Links, Royal Lytham & St Annes Golf Club
- 4 Formby Golf Club, Turnberry Golf Club, Royal Birkdale Golf Club,
- 3 Royal Cinque Ports Golf Club, Ganton Golf Club, Hillside Golf Club, Royal Portrush Golf Club, Royal North Devon Golf Club
- 2 Royal County Down Golf Club, Portmarnock Golf Club, Nairn Golf Club
- 1 Royal Aberdeen Golf Club, Royal Dornoch Golf Club, Ballyliffin Golf Club

=== Future sites ===
- 2027 - Royal Portrush
