= Herman de Zoete =

English cricketer (1877–1957)

Personal information
- Full name: Herman Walter de Zoete
- Born: 13 February 1877; Bromley Common, Kent, England
- Died: 26 March 1957 (aged 80); Ipswich, Suffolk, England
- Batting: Right-handed
- Bowling: Slow left-arm orthodox; Left-arm medium

Domestic team information
- Years: Team
- 1897–1898: Cambridge University
- 1897: Essex
- 1928: Hertfordshire

Career statistics
Competition	First-class
Matches	18
Runs scored	151
Batting average	6.86
100s/50s	0/0
Top score	29
Balls bowled	2,040
Wickets	55
Bowling average	18.78
5 wickets in innings	3
10 wickets in match	0
Best bowling	6/53
Catches/stumpings	7/–
- Source: Cricinfo, 24 February 2012

Herman Walter de Zoete (13 February 1877 – 26 March 1957) was an English cricketer. De Zoete was a right-handed batsman who bowled both slow left-arm orthodox and left-arm medium pace. He was born at Bromley Common, Kent, and was educated at Eton College.

While studying at the University of Cambridge, de Zoete made his first-class for Cambridge University against CI Thornton's XI in 1897. He made fifteen further first-class appearances for the university, the last of which came against Oxford University in the 1898 University Match at Lord's. Primarily a bowler, de Zoete took 52 wickets in his sixteen first-class appearances for the university, which came at an average of 18.11, with best figures of 6/53, one of three five wicket hauls he took. With the bat, he scored 149 runs at a batting average of 6.77, with a high score of 29. He also made two first-class appearances for Essex in the 1897 County Championship against Surrey and Hampshire, though without success. Thirty years later, de Zoete played for Hertfordshire in the 1928 Minor Counties Championship, making a single appearance against Cambridgeshire.

Outside of cricket, de Zoete represented Cambridge University at golf in 1896, 1897 and 1898, getting his blue each year. He first played in the Amateur Championship in 1903, reaching the semi-final where he lost to Robert Maxwell at the 19th hole. He played for England in the England–Scotland Amateur Match in 1903, 1904, 1906 and 1907.

De Zoete was married to Dorothy Courage, with the couple having five children. His brother-in-law, Charles Round, also played first-class cricket.

During World War I, de Zoete served in the Essex Yeomanry and rose to the rank of Captain.

De Zoete lived out his final years at Sproughton, Suffolk, before dying at Ipswich, Suffolk, on 26 March 1957. He was a paternal great grandfather of Harriet Phillips nee Sanders then Sperling, the second wife of Peter Phillips, eldest grandson of Queen Elizabeth II.
