= Harold Hilton =

English amateur golfer (1869-1942)

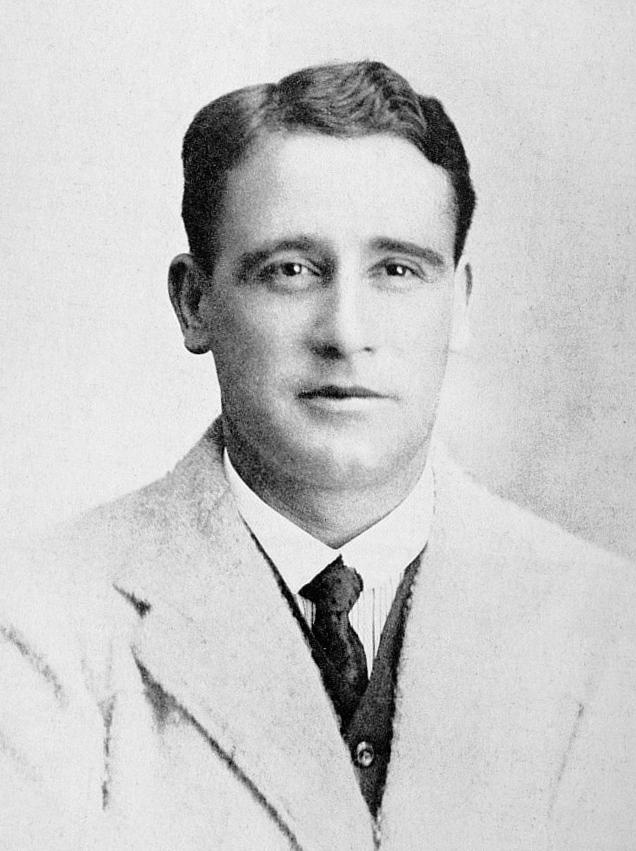
- Hilton in 1913

Personal information
- Full name: Harold Horsfall Hilton
- Nationality: England
- Born: 12 January 1869 West Kirby, Merseyside, England
- Died: 5 May 1942 (aged 73) Westcote, Gloucestershire, England
- Height: 5 ft 6 in (1.68 m)
- Weight: 155 lb (70 kg; 11.1 st)

Career
- Sport: Golf
- Status: Amateur

Best results in major championships (wins: 7)
- Masters Tournament: NYF
- PGA Championship: DNP
- U.S. Open: DNP
- The Open Championship: Won: 1892, 1897
- U.S. Amateur: Won: 1911
- British Amateur: Won: 1900, 1901, 1911, 1913

Achievements and awards
- World Golf Hall of Fame: 1978 (member page)

Harold Horsfall Hilton (12 January 1869 – 5 May 1942) was an English amateur golfer of the late 19th and early 20th centuries. He won The Open Championship twice, The Amateur Championship four times, and the U.S. Amateur Championship once.

== Career ==
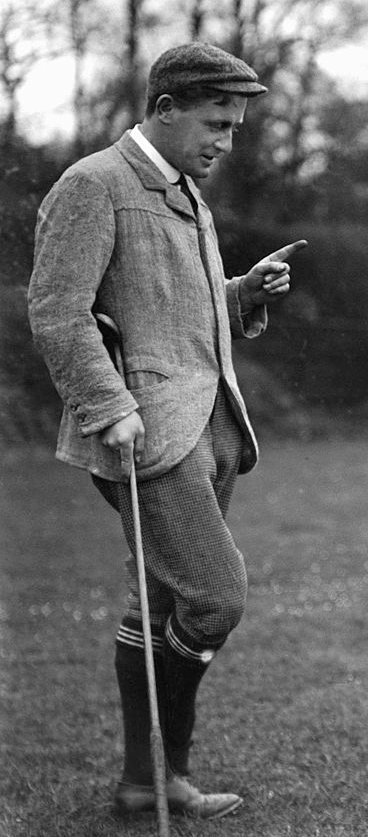
Hilton c. 1904

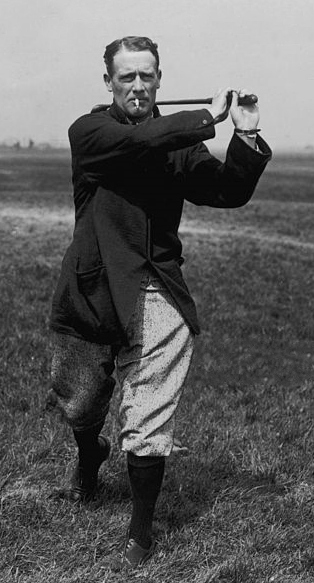
Hilton in 1914

Hilton was born in West Kirby and attended West Buckland School in Devon. In 1892, he won The Open Championship at Muirfield, becoming the second amateur to do so. He won again in 1897 at his home club, Royal Liverpool Golf Club, Hoylake. The only other amateurs who have won the Open Championship are John Ball and Bobby Jones. Hilton's autobiography My Golfing Reminiscences was published in 1907.

Hilton also won The Amateur Championship on four occasions, including 1911, when he became the only British player to win the British and U.S. Amateurs in the same year. Hilton retired with a 99–29 record (77.3%) at The Amateur Championship.

From 1905 to 1915, Hilton was a member at Ashford Manor Golf Club in Middlesex (now Surrey), the club having been incorporated in 1902. In 1912, he played a major part in designing Ferndown Golf Club in Dorset which became an Open Championship qualifying course and one of the top 100 courses in the UK.

== Personal life ==
Hilton died on 5 May 1942 at Gloucestershire, England at the age 73.

== Legacy ==
Hilton was also a golf writer. He was the co-author in 1912 of The Royal and Ancient Game of Golf with Garden Smith. The Donovan and Jerris golf book bibliography says about the book, "Quite simply stated, Hilton and Smith's "The Royal and Ancient Game of Golf" is one of the most magnificent books in the library of golf. Well-illustrated and sweeping in content…" He was also the first editor of Golf Monthly and also the editor of Golf Illustrated.

Hilton also designed many courses. In addition, he was inducted into the World Golf Hall of Fame in 1978.

== Bibliography ==
- 1907 My Golfing Reminiscences
- 1912 The Royal and Ancient Game of Golf (with Garden Smith)

== Tournament wins (47) ==
Note: This list may be incomplete

- 1889 Royal Liverpool Summer Lubbock Gold Medal, Royal Liverpool Autumn Kennard Gold Medal, Royal Liverpool St. Andrew's Gold Cross Medal, West Lancashire Golf Club Challenge Gold Medal, West Lancashire Golf Club Mayor's Prize, West Lancashire Golf Club St. Andrew's Challenge Gold Cross Medal
- 1891 Royal Liverpool Spring Club Gold Medal, Royal Liverpool Summer Lubbock Gold Medal, Birkdale Golf Club Crowther Cup
- 1892 **Open Championship**, Formby Cullen Silver Medal, Royal Liverpool Summer Lubbock Gold Medal, West Lancashire Golf Club Gold Medal, West Lancashire Golf Club Silver Challenge Cup, West Lancashire Golf Club St. Andrew's Gold Cross, West Lancashire Golf Club Easter Challenge Cup, Southport Golf Club Pilkington Centenary Gold Medal,
- 1893 St. George's Challenge Cup, Formby Prestwich Gold Medal, Formby Cullen Silver Medal, Royal Liverpool Spring Club Gold Medal, Royal Liverpool Spring Connaught Challenge Star Medal, Royal Liverpool Autumn Kennard Gold Medal, West Lancashire Golf Club Cookson Prize, West Lancashire Golf Club Silver Cup, West Lancashire Golf Club St. Andrew's Challenge Gold Cross Medal, Lytham & St. Anne's Golf Club Silver Iron, Lytham & St. Anne's Golf Club Thistleton Medal
- 1894 St. George's Challenge Cup
- 1897 **Open Championship**, Irish Amateur Open Championship
- 1899 Formby Prestwich Gold Medal, Formby Cullen Silver Medal, Formby St. Andrew's Medal, Royal Liverpool Spring Club Gold Medal, Royal Liverpool Spring Connaught Challenge Star Medal, Royal Liverpool Autumn Kennard Gold Medal, Royal Liverpool Milligan St. Andrew's Gold Cross
- 1900 **The Amateur Championship**, Irish Amateur Open Championship
- 1901 **The Amateur Championship**, Irish Amateur Open Championship
- 1902 Irish Amateur Open Championship
- 1911 **The Amateur Championship**, **U.S. Amateur**
- 1913 **The Amateur Championship**
- 1914 Golf Illustrated Gold Vase

Note: Major championship wins in bold

== Major championships ==
=== Professional wins (2) ===
Year	Championship	54 holes	Winning score	Margin	Runner(s)-up
1892	The Open Championship	2 shot deficit	78-81-72-74=305	3 strokes	(England) John Ball, (Scotland) Sandy Herd, (Scotland) Hugh Kirkaldy
1897	The Open Championship (2)	3 shot deficit	80-75-84-75=314	1 stroke	(Scotland) James Braid

=== Amateur wins (5) ===
Year	Championship	Winning score	Runner-up
1900	The Amateur Championship	8 & 7	(Scotland) James Robb
1901	The Amateur Championship	1 up	(Scotland) John L. Low
1911	The Amateur Championship	4 & 3	(England) Edward Lassen
1911	U.S. Amateur	37 holes	(United States) Fred Herreshoff
1913	The Amateur Championship	6 & 5	(Scotland) Robert Harris

=== Results timeline ===
Tournament	1887	1888	1889
The Open Championship			
The Amateur Championship	R16		R16

Tournament	1890	1891	1892	1893	1894	1895	1896	1897	1898	1899
The Open Championship		T8	1 LA	T8	WD	WD	23	1 LA	3 LA	T12
The Amateur Championship	QF	2	2	R32	QF	R32	2	R32	R16	QF
U.S. Amateur	NYF	NYF	NYF	NYF	NYF					

Tournament	1900	1901	1902	1903	1904	1905	1906	1907	1908	1909
The Open Championship	T16	4 LA	T6	T25	WD	CUT				WD
The Amateur Championship	1	1	QF	R64	QF	R64	R128	R16	R64	R32
U.S. Amateur										

Tournament	1910	1911	1912	1913	1914	1915	1916	1917	1918	1919
The Open Championship		T3 LA		WD	WD	NT	NT	NT	NT	NT
The Amateur Championship	SF	1	R16	1	R32	NT	NT	NT	NT	NT
U.S. Amateur		1 M	R32					NT	NT	

Tournament	1920	1921	1922	1923	1924	1925	1926	1927
The Open Championship								
The Amateur Championship	R32	R64	QF		R128	R256		R256
U.S. Amateur								

Note: Hilton only played in The Open Championship, U.S. Amateur, and The Amateur Championship.

Win
Top 10
Did not play

LA = Low amateur
M = Medalist
NYF = Tournament not yet founded
NT = No tournament
CUT = missed the half-way cut
WD = withdrew
"T" indicates a tie for a place
R256, R128, R64, R32, R16, QF, SF = Round in which player lost in match play

== Team appearances ==
- England–Scotland Amateur Match (representing England): 1902, 1903 (winners), 1904, 1905, 1906, 1907, 1908, 1909, 1910 (winners), 1911, 1912
- Coronation Match (representing the Amateurs): 1911
