= James Robb (golfer) =

Scottish golfer (1878–1949)

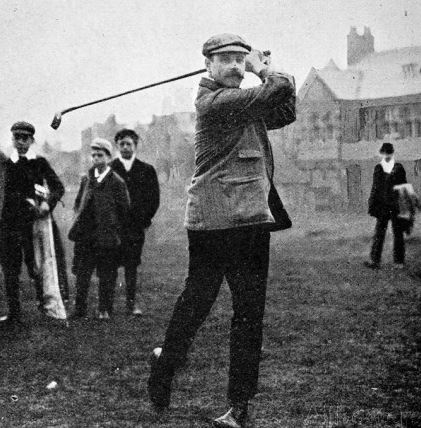
- Robb in 1906

Personal information
- Full name: James Robb, Jr.
- Nationality: Scotland
- Born: 1878 Dunfermline, Scotland
- Died: 24 July 1949 (aged 71) St Andrews, Scotland

Career
- Sport: Golf
- Status: Amateur

Best results in major championships (wins: 1)
- Masters Tournament: DNP
- PGA Championship: DNP
- U.S. Open: DNP
- The Open Championship: T13: 1895
- British Amateur: Won: 1906

James Robb, Jr. (1878 – 24 July 1949) was a Scottish amateur golfer who played in the late 19th and early 20th century. He won the Amateur Championship in 1906, finished runner-up in 1897 and 1900 and was a losing semi-finalist in 1898 and 1902.

== Early life and family ==
Robb was born in Dunfermline, Scotland, in 1878, the son of Agnes (née Wilson) and James Robb. His father was a shipper of potatoes for a London firm. He had an older brother, Tom, who was also an amateur golfer.

== Golf career ==
James and Tom Robb won the Glasgow Evening Times foursomes tournament in September 1895, representing St Andrews Thistle. James was still a teenager while Tom was just 21.

In 1896 he won the Dundee Evening Telegraph Cup, the unofficial Scottish Amateur Championship. In 1906 the golf writer Ernest Lehmann said of Robb, “Mr. Robb is one of those natural players of whom one says, the moment he takes club in hand, '"this man is a good player'". He has not got quite the length of some players with his wooden clubs, but any small deficiency in this respect is more than redressed by the deadly sureness of his short game. He hits the ball absolutely truly, and it runs to the hole in that smooth manner which terrifies the opponent and delights the striker, for each knows that the ball is going to have a good chance of going into the hole.” Robb's style of play was further described as one that employed "a great deal of supple wrist work in the address, a quick round swing, and a fine finish."

=== 1906 Amateur Championship ===
The afternoon round of the 1906 Amateur Championship final at Royal Liverpool Golf Club was going along normally until the two finalists reached the 6th hole. What happened next would become known as "the hole that was halved in 9". Robb and his opponent—Clifford Lingen—both failed to hit any quality golf shots for the onlooking spectators to admire. Instead, their performances on the hole were disastrous.

The Times reported that "The 6th is a very long story. Dead against a strong wind Mr. Lingen drove out of bounds, dropped another onto a bad lie on the tee, got a poor third, topped his fourth, and sliced his fifth into a bunker. On the other hand Mr. Robb drove against the fence, played his second backwards, reached some rushes with his third, played his fourth to square leg, almost into a ditch, his fifth into the garden, and his sixth into the rushes near the green. Eventually both were ^{†}dead in 7. They both missed their putts and halved in 9." The Manchester Courier and Lancashire General Advertiser reported that the play at the hole "was the worst exhibition of golf that has probably ever been seen in a great match."

Robb, however—in spite of his poor play at the 6th hole—went on to win the tournament.

== Career ==
Robb worked as a teller for Clydesdale Bank at St Andrews and Ayr. He retired in 1938 after 40 years service. In appreciation for his years of service with the bank, he was presented with an 18 carat gold pocket watch.

== Death and legacy ==
Robb died at the Memorial Cottage Hospital, St Andrews, in July 1949. Robb is best remembered for winning the 1906 Amateur Championship and twice finishing runner-up in 1897 and 1900.

== Tom Robb ==
James Robb's older brother Thomas Wilson 'Tom' Robb (1874 – 1920) played a number of times in the Amateur Championship, his best year being 1911 when he lost in the fourth round. Tom played in the 1920 Amateur Championship, losing to Tommy Armour in the first round. Just a few months later he died. He had played in a monthly medal two days before his death and had been to work at his job at Clydesdale Bank on the day of his death. He died of a heart seizure aged 46. Tom had lived in Glasgow since 1894.

== Major championships ==
=== Amateur wins (1) ===
Year	Championship	Winning score	Runner-up
1906	The Amateur Championship	4 & 3	(England) Clifford Lingen

=== Results timeline ===
Tournament	1895	1896	1897	1898	1899
The Open Championship	T13 LA				
The Amateur Championship	R64		2	SF	R64

Tournament	1900	1901	1902	1903	1904	1905	1906	1907	1908	1909
The Open Championship				T49						
The Amateur Championship	2	R32	SF	R64	R64	R128	1	R32		R64

Tournament	1910	1911	1912	1913	1914	1915	1916	1917	1918	1919
The Open Championship						NT	NT	NT	NT	NT
The Amateur Championship		R32		R256		NT	NT	NT	NT	NT

Tournament	1920	1921	1922
The Open Championship			
The Amateur Championship	R128	R256	R256

Note: Robb only played in the Open Championship and the Amateur Championship.

Win
Top 10
Did not play

LA = Low amateur
NT = No tournament
"T" indicates a tie for a place
R256, R128, R64, R32, R16, QF, SF = Round in which player lost in match play

Sources: Open Championship, 1898 Amateur, 1899 Amateur, 1901 Amateur, 1902 Amateur, 1903 Amateur, 1904 Amateur, 1905 Amateur, 1907 Amateur, 1909 Amateur, 1911 Amateur, 1913 Amateur, 1920 Amateur, 1921 Amateur, 1922 Amateur,

== Team appearances ==
- England–Scotland Amateur Match (representing Scotland): 1902 (winners), 1903, 1905 (winners), 1906 (winners), 1907 (winners)

== Notes ==
^{†} In British golf parlance, "dead" or "stone dead" refers to a golf ball very close to the hole—so close that a missed putt is highly unlikely.
