= Horace Hutchinson =

English golfer (1859–1932)

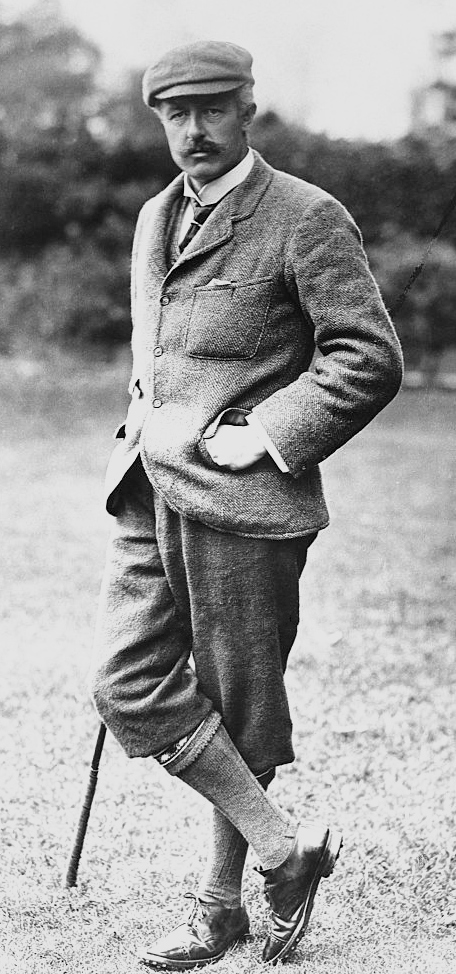
- Hutchinson, c. 1898

Personal information
- Full name: Horatio Gordon Hutchinson
- Nickname: Horace
- Nationality: England
- Born: 16 May 1859 London, England
- Died: 27 July 1932 (aged 73) Chelsea, London, England
- Height: 5 ft 11.5 in (182 cm)
- Weight: 175 lb (79 kg; 12.5 st)
- Spouse: Dorothy Margaret Chapman

Career
- Sport: Golf
- College: Corpus Christi College; Oxford University
- Status: Amateur

Best results in major championships
- Masters Tournament: DNP
- PGA Championship: DNP
- U.S. Open: DNP
- The Open Championship: 6th: 1890
- British Amateur: Won: 1886; 1887

Horatio Gordon "Horace" Hutchinson (16 May 1859 – 27 July 1932) was an English amateur golfer who played in the late 19th century and early 20th century. Hutchinson won the 1886 and 1887 Amateur Championships. He had three top-10 finishes in the Open Championship, his best result being sixth in the 1890 Open Championship.

He was also a prolific writer of books on the subject of golf and other sporting themes. Hutchinson was the second English captain of the St Andrews Golf Club, Scotland. Onesiphorus Tyndall Bruce was the first Englishman to captain the R&A in 1838. Hutchinson suffered from a grave illness in the latter portion of his life and committed suicide in Chelsea, London, England, on 27 July 1932.

== Early life ==
Hutchinson, born 16 May 1859 in London, England, was the third son of General William Nelson Hutchinson (1803–1895) and Mary Hutchinson (née Russell). He began his golfing career at an early age playing at the Royal North Devon Golf Club—also known as Westward Ho!—a course founded in 1864 and designed by Old Tom Morris. By the age of 16, he won the club medal championship. He attended the University of Oxford's Corpus Christi College from 1878 to 1881, where he was a cricket player, and where he made an immediate impression by playing number one on the Oxford University golf team, and led them to victory over arch-rival Cambridge in the University Golf Match.

During his Oxford years he would spend vacations at home playing the Royal North Devon course accompanied by a young orphaned caddie who was employed by the Hutchinson family as a houseboy. The young lad went by the name of John Henry Taylor. Taylor's future exploits in golf—which included winning five Open Championships—would become legendary.

Hutchinson was a keen billiards player and enjoyed rowing, shooting and angling. He graduated from Oxford BA with third-class honours in literae humaniores (1881) and entered the Inner Temple with a view to reading for the bar, but his health, always frail, temporarily broke down. In 1890 he considered becoming a sculptor and studied briefly under G. F. Watts. In 1893 he married Dorothy Margaret Chapman, daughter of Major Frederick Barclay Chapman of the 14th Hussars.

== The Amateur Championship ==
Hutchinson's major accomplishments in golf were his two victories in the 1886 and 1887 Amateur Championships. He became the first player to successfully defend the title by defeating the great John Ball on Ball's home course at Royal Liverpool Golf Club in Hoylake.

Hutchinson was an avid student—and later teacher—of the mechanics of the golf swing, so he decided to put forth in writing his suggestions on methods of play. He said, among other things, "The great secret of all strokes played for the most part is to make the club travel as long as possible in the direction in which you want the ball to go".

In 1896, showing his humorous side on the subject of golf etiquette, Hutchinson remarked:

If your adversary is badly bunkered, there is no rule against your standing over him counting his strokes aloud, with increasing gusto as their number mounts up, but it will be a wise precaution to arm yourself with the niblick before doing so, so as to meet him on equal terms.

== Business ventures ==
From 1910 a local director to their West End branch and later its chairman, Hutchinson was elected to the court of Directors of Royal Exchange Assurance Corporation in May 1919. Following Hutchinson's death in 1932 the chairman of Royal Exchange began his address to their 213th Annual General Court by telling of his deepest regret. "He had the interests of the Corporation always very much at heart and the charm of his personality endeared him to his colleagues and to all those with whom he came in contact. He is very much missed by us all".

In 1905, with his golfing friend H. C. B. Underdown, he became one of the two first directors of Commercial Cars Limited (Commer) which the pair of them set up to make Commer commercial vehicles. Their venture was intended to capitalize on a promising preselector gearbox invented for heavy vehicles. He remained on that board until his death.

== Death ==
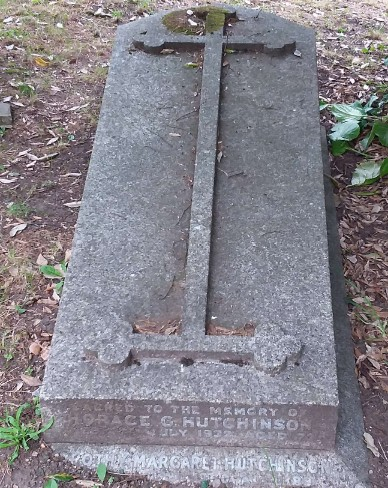
Grave of Horace Hutchinson in Highgate Cemetery

Although he lived to be 73 years old, Hutchinson suffered with poor health most of his life, and was for the last eighteen years of life incapacitated by grave illness. Before 1920 he left his Sussex home, Shepherds Gate, Coleman's Hatch, across Royal Ashdown Forest Golf Club from Forest Row, and moved to 29 Lennox Gardens, Chelsea, London. Eighteen years after he could no longer play golf, he committed suicide there on 27 July 1932 and was buried on the eastern side of Highgate Cemetery. He was survived by his wife. According to his 1932 probate, his wealth at death was £26,337 (£1.59 million today).

== Legacy ==
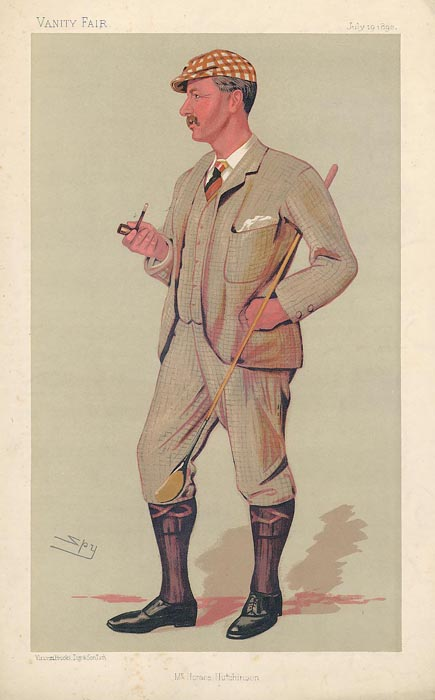
Caricature of Hutchinson (1890) by Leslie Ward, from Vanity Fair magazine

American golf teaching professional Mike Stevens said of Hutchinson, "In my mind, there is no question that Horace Hutchinson was a teacher extraordinaire and is clearly the father of golf instruction".

Walter Travis, in 1904—shortly after his victories in the 1903 U.S. Amateur and 1904 British Amateur—said of Hutchinson:

All things considered, the golfer whom I most admired as a player was Horace Hutchinson. Over here we have read so many of his books and spoken of him so long as a veteran that one is surprised to find he is only forty-seven years old. He plays every shot for what it is worth and in perfect style, as free as any supple youth, and, all told, I pronounce him, to my mind, the ideal golfer.

== Tournament wins (25) ==
Note: This list may be incomplete.

- 1875 Royal North Devon Golf Club Boy's Bronze Scratch Medal, Royal North Devon Golf Club Autumn Scratch Medal
- 1878 Crookham Cup
- 1879 Crookham Cup, Royal Liverpool Autumn Dowie Silver Cup Medal
- 1880 Crookham Cup
- 1884 St. Andrews Autumn Gold Medal, St. Andrews George Glennie Medal
- 1885 Royal Liverpool Spring Connaught Challenge Star Medal
- 1886 The Amateur Championship, Royal North Devon Golf Club Spring Prince of Wales Gold Challenge Medal
- 1887 The Amateur Championship, St. Andrews Autumn Gold Medal, St. Andrews Spring Silver Cross Medal, Royal North Devon Golf Club Spring Prince of Wales Gold Challenge Medal
- 1889 Royal Eastbourne Fall Hartington Gold Medal, St. Andrews Autumn Gold Medal
- 1892 Royal Eastbourne Spring Club Gold Medal, Royal Eastbourne Fall Hartington Gold Medal
- 1894 Royal Liverpool Spring Medal, Royal Liverpool Fall Medal
- 1895 Royal Liverpool Fall Medal
- 1896 Royal Liverpool Fall Medal

== Major championships ==
=== Amateur wins (2) ===
Year	Championship	Winning score	Runner-up
1886	The Amateur Championship	7 & 6	(England) Henry Lamb
1887	The Amateur Championship	1 up	(England) John Ball

=== Results timeline ===
Tournament	1885	1886	1887	1888	1889
The Open Championship	T11 LA	T16	T10		
The Amateur Championship	2	1	1	R16	R32

Tournament	1890	1891	1892	1893	1894	1895	1896	1897	1898	1899
The Open Championship	6	T24	10		WD					CUT
The Amateur Championship	QF		QF		R32		SF		R16	

Tournament	1900	1901	1902	1903	1904	1905	1906	1907	1908	1909
The Open Championship										
The Amateur Championship	R64	SF	R64	2	SF	R128	R16	R64	R256	R64

Tournament	1910	1911	1912
The Open Championship			
The Amateur Championship	R32	R64	R256

Note: Hutchinson played in only The Open Championship and The Amateur Championship.

Win
Top 10
Did not play

LA = low amateur
WD = withdrew
"T" indicates a tie for a place
R256, R128, R64, R32, R16, QF, SF = round in which player lost in match play

== Team appearances ==
- England–Scotland Amateur Match (representing England): 1902, 1903 (winners), 1904, 1906, 1907, 1909

== Books written by Hutchinson ==
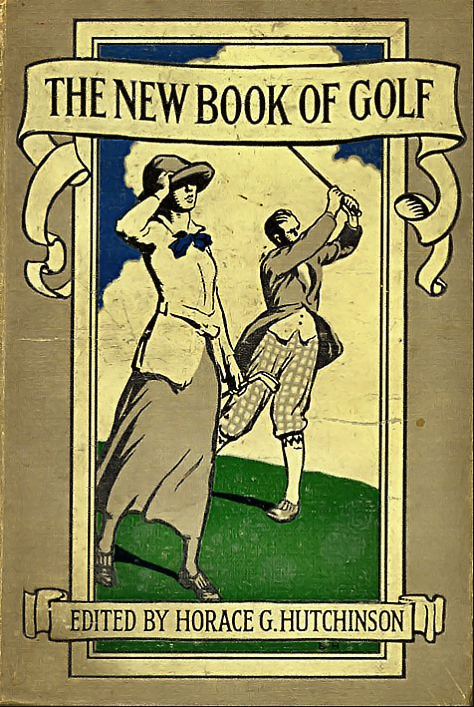
The New Book of Golf (1912).

Note: This list may be incomplete.

- Hints on the Game of Golf (1886)
- The Badminton Library of Sports and Pastimes – Golf (1890)
- The Golf Pilgrim on Many Links (1897)
- The Book of Golf and Golfers (1899)
- A Friend of Nelson (1902)
- Bert Edward, The Golf Caddie (1903)
- The New Book of Golf (1912) – with contributions by May Hezlet, et al.
- Life of Sir John Lubbock, Lord Avebury (1914)
- The Eight of Diamonds: the Story of Week-End (1914)
- Fifty Years of Golf (1919)
- Portraits of the Eighties (1920)
