= Muirfield =

Golf club in Gullane, Scotland

Coordinates: 56.042°N 2.821°W

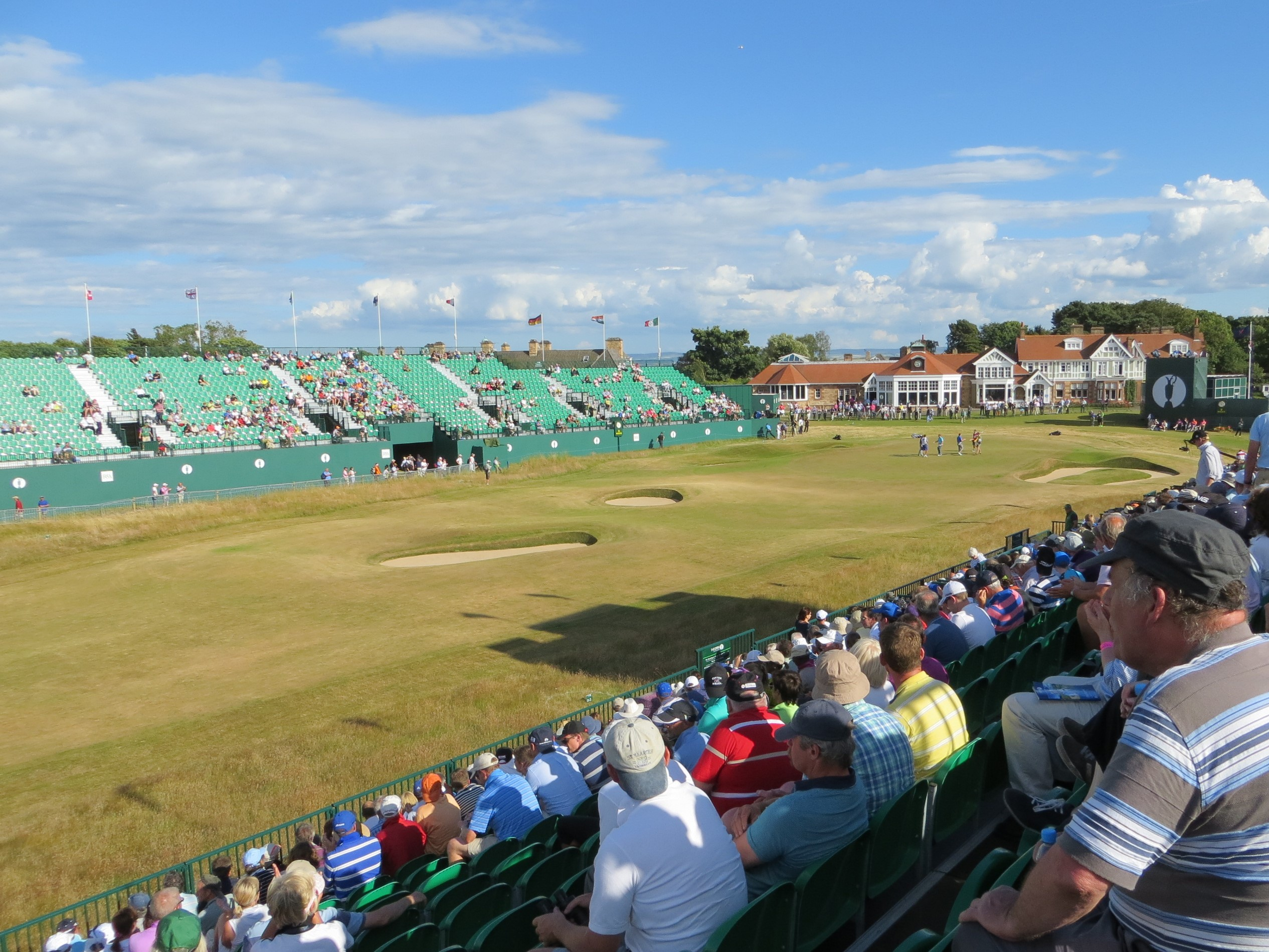
- The Open at Muirfield in July 2013

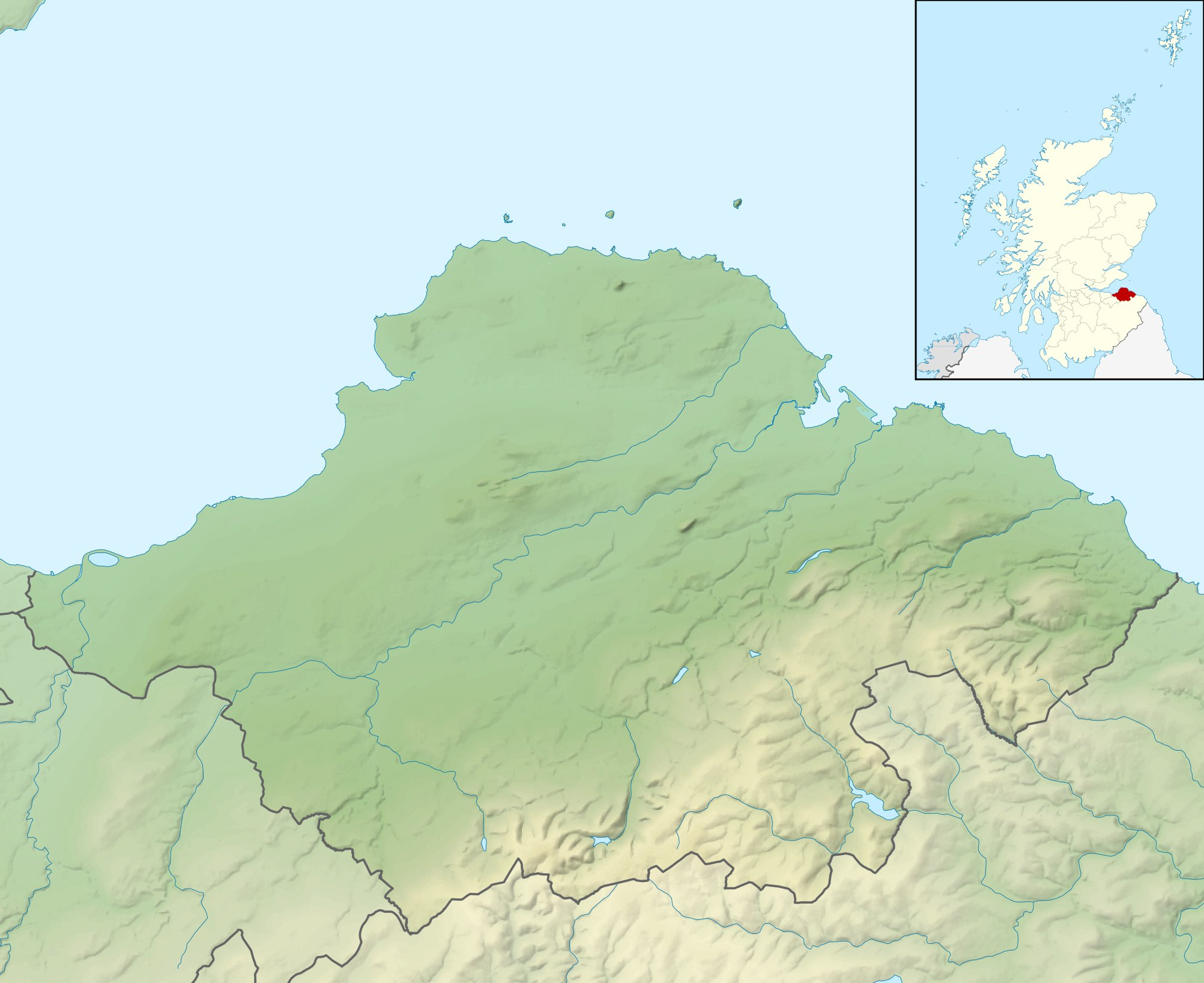
- Location in Scotland Location in East Lothian, Scotland

Club information
- Location: Gullane, Scotland, UK
- Established: 1744 (1891)
- Type: Private
- Tota holes: Golf:18
- Tournaments: The Open Championship; The Amateur; Senior Open Championship
- Website: https://www.muirfield.org.uk
- Designed by: Tom Morris Sr.
- Par: 71
- Length: 7,245 yards (6,625 m)
- Course rating: 73

Muirfield is a privately owned golf links which is the home of The Honourable Company of Edinburgh Golfers. Located in Gullane, Scotland, overlooking the Firth of Forth, Muirfield is one of the golf courses used in rotation for The Open Championship.

Muirfield has hosted The Open Championship sixteen times, most recently in 2013 when Phil Mickelson lifted the trophy. Other past winners at Muirfield include Ernie Els, Nick Faldo (twice), Tom Watson, Lee Trevino, Jack Nicklaus, Gary Player, Henry Cotton, Alf Perry, Walter Hagen, Harry Vardon and Harold Hilton. Muirfield has also hosted The Amateur Championship (ten times), the Ryder Cup in 1973, the 1959 and 1979 Walker Cup, the 1952 and 1984 Curtis Cup, and many other tournaments including the Women’s British Open.

Muirfield has an unusual layout for a links course. Most links courses run along the coast and then back again leading to two sets of nine holes, the holes in each set facing roughly in the same direction. Muirfield was among the first courses to depart from this arrangement and is arranged as two loops of nine holes, one clockwise, one anticlockwise. This means that assuming the wind direction remains the same throughout a round, virtually every hole on the course has a different apparent wind direction from the tee. No more than three consecutive holes follow the same direction at any stage. The course borders on Archerfield Wood, which features in "The Pavilion on the Links", the short story by Robert Louis Stevenson.

Jack Nicklaus won three Open Championships, the first at Muirfield in 1966, which completed the first of his three career grand slams. Nicklaus has described Muirfield as "the best golf course in Britain." He later developed a championship golf course and community in Dublin, Ohio, a suburb north of his hometown of Columbus. Opened in 1974, Nicklaus named it Muirfield Village; it has hosted his Memorial Tournament, a top invitational event on the PGA Tour since 1976.

Muirfield has halted two post-war attempts at the grand slam, denying the third major of the year to winners of the first two, the Masters and U.S. Open. Nicklaus was runner-up by a stroke in 1972 to Trevino, and Tiger Woods ran into gale-force winds and rain in the third round in 2002 and shot an 81; he rebounded with a 65 on Sunday to finish at even-par, six strokes out of the playoff in a tie for 28th place.

== The Honourable Company of Edinburgh Golfers ==
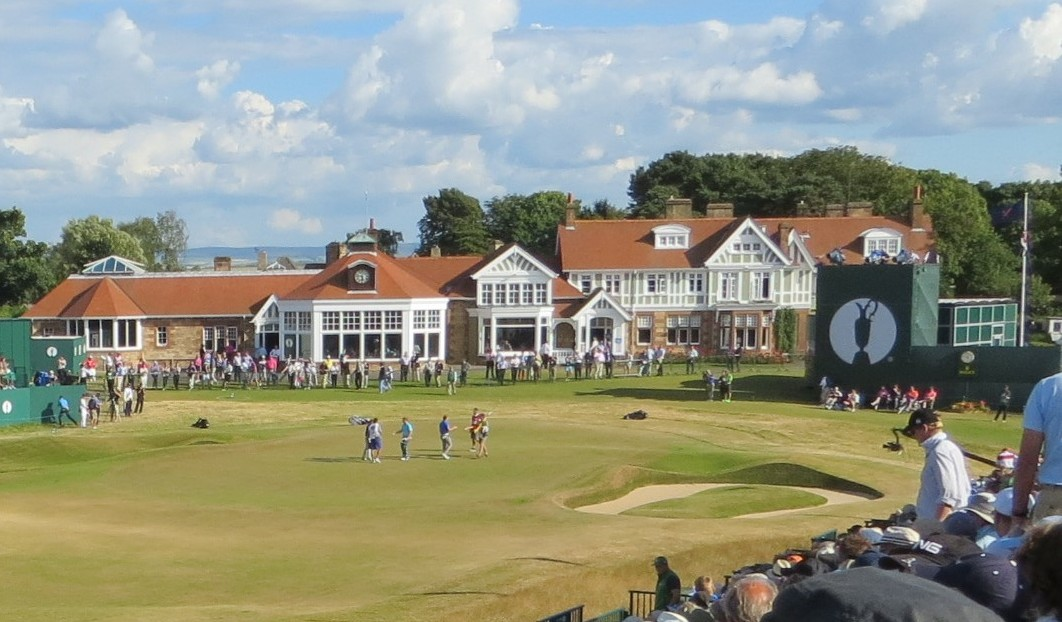
The clubhouse of The Honourable Company of Edinburgh Golfers

The Honourable Company of Edinburgh Golfers, now based at Muirfield, holds the claim of being the oldest verifiable organised golf club in the world, although the game of golf is several centuries older. The club's records date continuously back to 1744, when it produced thirteen "Rules of Golf" for its first competition which was played at Leith Links for the "Silver Club". This trophy had been requested by the HCEG from the City of Edinburgh Council, which agreed. The first competition was won by John Rattray, who signed the rules and became the first club captain. The club played on the five holes at Leith Links for nearly a century, but overcrowding forced a move in 1836 to Musselburgh Links's 9-hole Old Course which, like many prestigious Scottish courses including St Andrews, is a public course, and this course also eventually became too crowded for the liking of the HCEG's members.

In 1795 the Club applied to the Edinburgh Council for a Charter. This was granted on 26 March 1800 together with a Seal of Cause under the new title of 'The Honourable Company of Edinburgh Golfers'.

In 1891, the club built a new private 18-hole course at Muirfield, taking the Open Championship with them. This situation caused some ill feeling at Musselburgh, which lost the right to hold the Open. Old Tom Morris designed the new course, which met with wide approval from the start; it has been modified and updated several times since, in significant ways up to the late 1920s, after which it has remained stable. The first Open held on the new course in 1892 was the first tournament anywhere contested over four rounds, or 72 holes.

=== Membership policy ===
Until 2017, women were barred from holding membership of the Company, though were permitted to play the course as guests or visitors. The exclusion of women from membership was controversial. After a May 2016 vote on the policy reached a majority, but not the two-thirds supermajority required for change, The R&A removed Muirfield from the rotation of Open venues. Speaking shortly after the announcement, secretary Stuart McEwen said the outcome was 'a blow to the club, the local community and Scotland'.

The public backlash led Muirfield to re-ballot on the issue. In March 2017 the club voted to admit women as members. In August 2022 Muirfield hosted the Women's British Open for the first time.

== Course ==
The course has been extended by 211 yards (193 m) since the 2002 Championship to 7,245 yards (6,625 m).

Hole	1	2	3	4	5	6	7	8	9	Out	10	11	12	13	14	15	16	17	18	In	Total
Yards	450	367	379	229	561	469	187	445	558	3,645	472	389	382	193	478	447	188	578	473	3,600	7,245
Par	4	4	4	3	5	4	3	4	5	36	4	4	4	3	4	4	3	5	4	35	71

Lengths of the course for Opens since 1950:

- 2013: 7,192 yards (6,576 m), par 71
- 2002: 7,034 yards (6,432 m), par 71
- 1992: 6,970 yards (6,373 m), par 71
- 1987: 6,963 yards (6,367 m), par 71
- 1980: 6,926 yards (6,333 m), par 71
- 1972: 6,892 yards (6,302 m), par 71
- 1966: 6,887 yards (6,297 m), par 71
- 1959: 6,806 yards (6,223 m), par 72

== The Open Championship ==
The Open Championship was first held at Muirfield in 1892 and has hosted 16 times, the last in 2013.

Year	Winner	Score					Winner's share (£)
Year	Winner	R1	R2	R3	R4	Total	Winner's share (£)
1892	(England) Harold Hilton (a) ^{1st}	78	81	72	74	305	(am)
1896	(Jersey) Harry Vardon ^{1st}	83	78	78	77	316 ^{PO}	30
1901	(Scotland) James Braid ^{1st}	79	76	74	80	309	30
1906	(Scotland) James Braid ^{3rd}	77	76	74	73	300	30
1912	(Jersey) Ted Ray	71	73	76	75	295	50
1929	(United States) Walter Hagen ^{4th}	75	67	75	75	292 (+12)	100
1935	(England) Alf Perry	69	75	67	72	283 (−5)	100
1948	(England) Henry Cotton ^{3rd}	71	66	75	72	284 (E)	150
1959	(South Africa) Gary Player ^{1st}	75	71	70	68	284 (−4)	1,000
1966	(United States) Jack Nicklaus ^{1st}	70	67	75	70	282 (−2)	2,100
1972	(United States) Lee Trevino ^{2nd}	71	70	66	71	278 (−6)	5,500
1980	(United States) Tom Watson ^{3rd}	68	70	64	69	271 (−13)	25,000
1987	(England) Nick Faldo ^{1st}	68	69	71	71	279 (−5)	75,000
1992	(England) Nick Faldo ^{3rd}	66	64	69	73	272 (−12)	95,000
2002	(South Africa) Ernie Els ^{1st}	70	66	72	70	278 (−6)^{PO}	700,000
2013	(United States) Phil Mickelson	69	74	72	66	281 (−3)	945,000

- Note: For multiple winners of The Open Championship, superscript ordinal identifies which in their respective careers.
- (a) denotes amateur

== The Senior British Open ==
The Senior British Open Championship was first held at Muirfield in 2007.

Year	Winner	Score					Winner's share (£)
Year	Winner	R1	R2	R3	R4	Total	Winner's share (£)
2007	(United States) Tom Watson ^{3rd}	70	71	70	73	284 (E)	157,800

== Women's British Open ==
The Women's British Open has been held at Muirfield once:

Year	Winner	Score					Winner's share ($)
Year	Winner	R1	R2	R3	R4	Total	Winner's share ($)
2022	(South Africa) Ashleigh Buhai	70	65	64	75	274 (−10)^{PO}	1,095,000

== See also ==
- Golf in Scotland
