= Royal St George's Golf Club =

Golf club in Kent, England

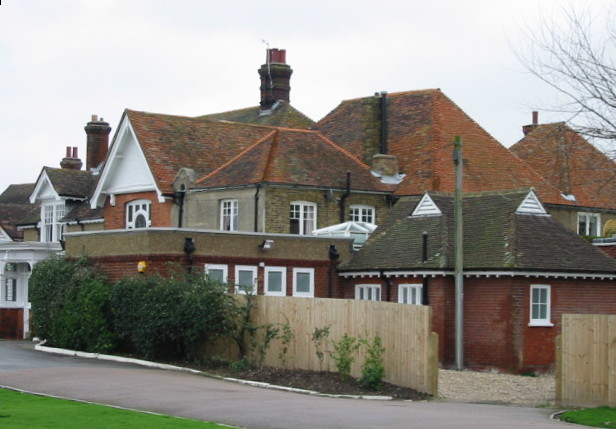
- Clubhouse in 2007

- Map showing the location of Royal St George's Golf Club in Sandwich, Kent, England
- 51.274°N 1.367°E

Club information
- Location: Sandwich, Kent, England
- Established: 1887
- Type: Private
- Total holes: 18
- Tournaments: The Open Championship (15 times); Dunlop Masters (1967); British PGA Championship (5 times (1975, 1976, 1977, 1980, 1983))
- Website: royalstgeorges.com
- Designed by: Laidlaw Purves (1887); Martin Ebert (2016 renovation)
- Par: 70
- Length: 7,204 yards (6,587 m)

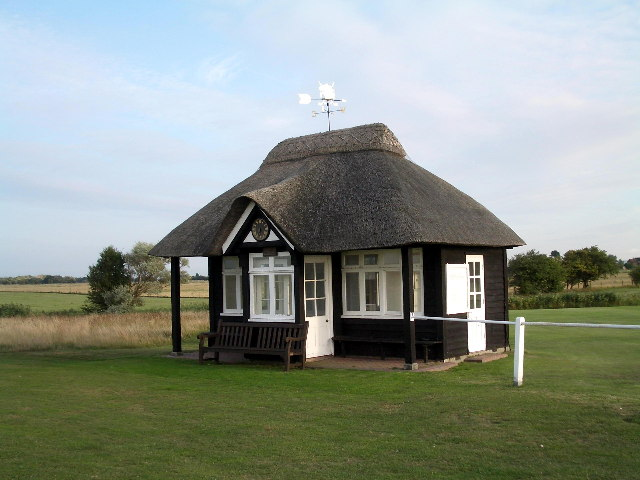
The starters hut at the 1st hole

The Royal St George's Golf Club is a golf club located in Sandwich, Kent, England. It is one of the courses on The Open Championship rota, and the only one in South East England. The club has hosted 15 Open championships, the first in 1894 when it became the first club outside Scotland to host the championship. Past champions include Collin Morikawa, Darren Clarke, Ben Curtis, Greg Norman, Sandy Lyle, Bill Rogers, Bobby Locke, Reg Whitcombe, Henry Cotton, Walter Hagen (on two occasions), Harry Vardon (on two occasions), Jack White and John Henry Taylor. In 2021, Royal St. George's saw Collin Morikawa win The Open Championship. It has also hosted The Amateur Championship 14 times.

== History ==
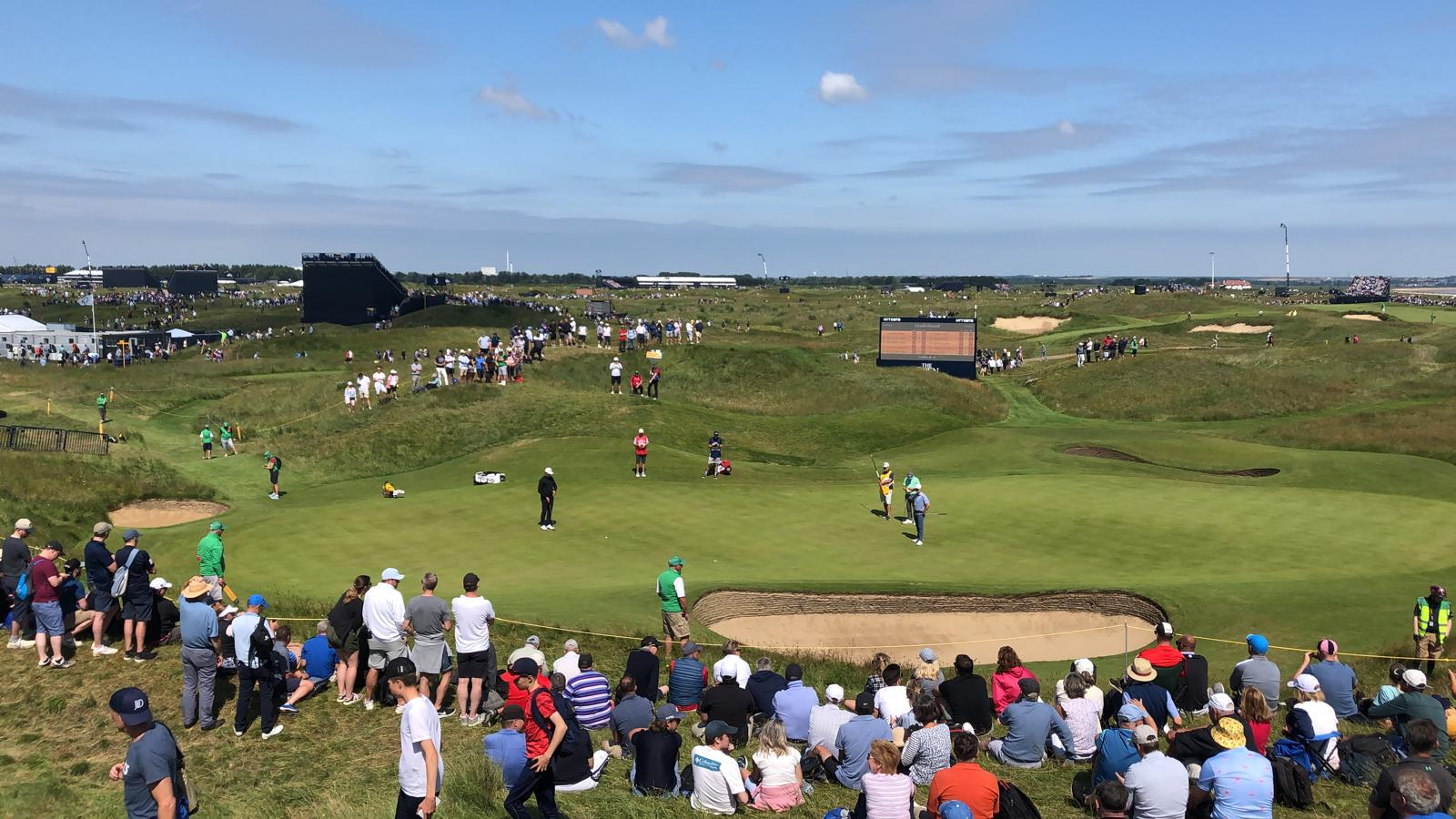
The 6th Green, 2021 Open Championship

The club was founded by the surgeon Laidlaw Purves in 1887 in a setting of wild duneland. Laidlaw Purves and his brother, Alexander Pattison Purves WS, stood at the top of the tower of St Clement's Church to survey the surrounding countryside. "By George, what a place for a golf course' was exclaimed by Doctor Purves. Whilst some believe the club's name was decided beforehand by the doctor's remark at St. Clement's, nevertheless, holding England's patron saint at the forefront of the club implicated 'a promise of national distinction'. It was only in 1902 that St George's became Royal St Georges, becoming the 31st golf club granted royal status in the world. Doctor Purves was adamant to create and present the ethos and traditions that are held at St. Andrews Golf Club, however in the South of England. Many holes feature blind or partially blind shots, although this element has been reduced somewhat, after several 20th century modifications. The course also possesses the deepest bunker in championship golf, located on its fourth hole.

Author Ian Fleming used the Royal St George's course under the name "Royal St. Marks" in his 1959 novel Goldfinger. In 1964, Fleming was elected Captain by his predecessor Eric Pemberton. The following day, Fleming died of a heart attack at a hospital in Canterbury.

== Competitions ==
=== Challenge Cup ===
The club's Challenge Cup dates from 1888 and is one of the oldest amateur events in golf. It has been contested annually over 36 holes except during the war years. A 19-year-old Jack Nicklaus won the tournament in 1959 shortly before going on to win the first of his two U.S. Amateur titles.

=== Halford Hewitt ===
After being founded in 1924, The Halford Hewitt, a foursomes knockout match, was originally played at Royal Cinque Ports Golf Club. In 1950, the competition, due to increased capacity, expanded its first two out of ten rounds to The Royal St George's Golf Club, and has since then been the case.

=== The Open Championship ===
Royal St George's has hosted The Open Championship on 15 occasions since 1894. This was the first time the event had been held outside Scotland. Due to Sandwich's medieval styled architecture and roads, traffic became increasingly difficult to manage, and the club would not see another Open Championship for more than 30 years after Bobby Locke's win in 1949. Along with traffic capabilities, Royal St George's was redeemed as inappropriate test for a modern professional.

Year	Winner	Score					Winners share (£)
Year	Winner	R1	R2	R3	R4	Total	Winners share (£)
1894	(England) J.H. Taylor ^{1st}	84	80	81	81	326	30
1899	(Jersey) Harry Vardon ^{3rd}	76	76	81	77	310	30
1904	(Scotland) Jack White	80	75	72	69	296	50
1911	(Jersey) Harry Vardon ^{5th}	74	74	75	80	303 ^{PO}	50
1922	(United States) Walter Hagen ^{1st}	76	73	79	72	300	75
1928	(United States) Walter Hagen ^{3rd}	75	73	72	72	292	100
1934	(England) Henry Cotton ^{1st}	67	65	72	79	283	100
1938	(England) Reg Whitcombe	71	71	75	78	295	100
1949	(South Africa) Bobby Locke ^{1st}	69	76	68	70	283 (−5)	300
1981	(United States) Bill Rogers	72	66	67	71	276 (−4)	25,000
1985	(Scotland) Sandy Lyle	68	71	73	70	282 (+2)	65,000
1993	(Australia) Greg Norman ^{2nd}	66	68	69	64	267 (−13)	100,000
2003	(United States) Ben Curtis	72	72	70	69	283 (−1)	700,000
2011	(Northern Ireland) Darren Clarke	68	68	69	70	275 (−5)	900,000
2021	(United States) Collin Morikawa	67	64	68	66	265 (−15)	$2,070,000

- Note: For multiple winners of The Open Championship, superscript ordinal identifies which in their respective careers.

== Scorecard ==
Royal St. George's Golf Club
Tee	Rating/Slope	1	2	3	4	5	6	7	8	9	Out	10	11	12	13	14	15	16	17	18	In	Total
Championship		442	426	239	496	416	176	573	457	410	3635	412	242	379	457	545	493	161	424	456	3569	7204
Par		4	4	3	4	4	3	5	4	4	35	4	3	4	4	5	4	3	4	4	35	70
Medal		411	385	195	415	416	152	490	419	373	3256	371	215	361	442	533	436	161	418	437	3374	6630
Weekday		399	350	180	412	406	142	464	395	366	3114	351	202	340	420	507	435	150	392	429	3226	6340
SI		10	6	16	2	8	18	14	4	12		9	7	15	3	13	1	17	5	11

== See also ==
- List of golf clubs granted Royal status
