= Jack White (golfer) =

Scottish professional golfer (1873–1949)

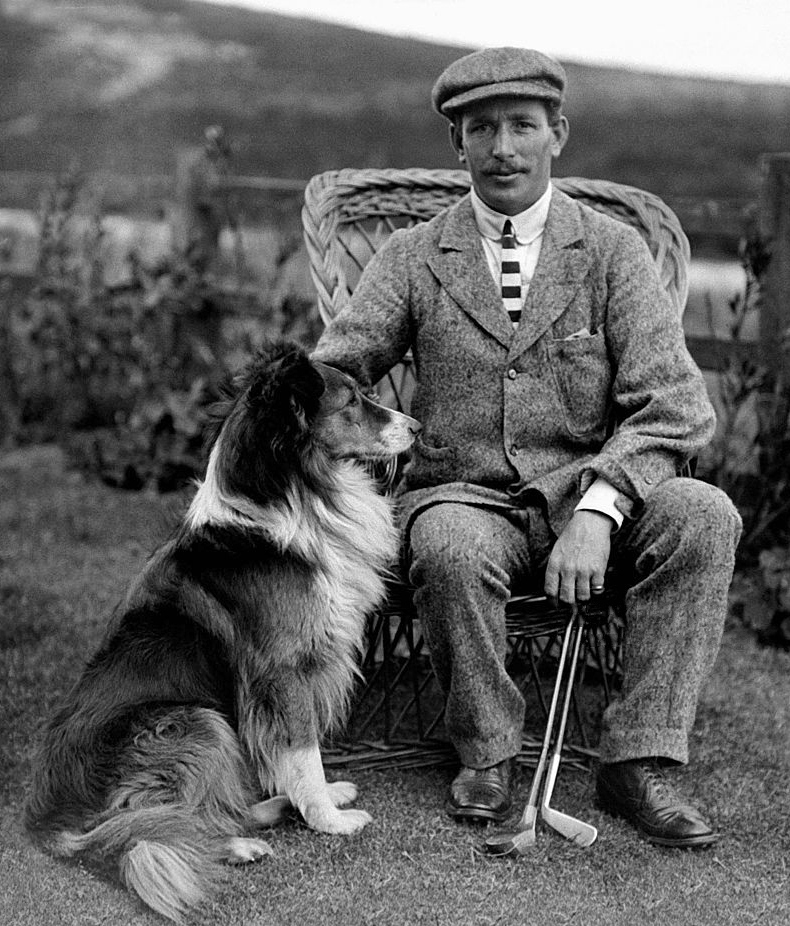
- Jack White in 1904

Personal information
- Full name: John White
- Nickname: Jack
- Nationality: Scotland
- Born: 15 August 1873 Pefferside, Whitekirk. Scotland
- Died: 24 March 1949 (aged 75) Musselburgh, Scotland

Career
- Sport: Golf
- Status: Professional
- Professional wins: 1

Best results in major championships (wins: 1)
- Masters Tournament: DNP
- PGA Championship: DNP
- U.S. Open: WD: 1929
- The Open Championship: Won: 1904

John White (15 August 1873 – 24 March 1949) was a Scottish professional golfer. He posted six top-10 finishes in the Open Championship, including a victory in 1904.

== Early life ==
White was born at Pefferside, Whitekirk, four miles east of North Berwick. He was the son of James White, an agricultural labourer, and his wife Emily Thomson White.

Thomson was born into what was called "famous Thomson golfing dynasty." That extended family included: Willie Thomson, a brother-in-law; Ben Sayers, a brother-in-law; Davie Grant, a brother-in-law; Wilfred Thomson, a brother-in-law and head professional at various UK and US golf clubs including The Country Club of Virginia; George Thomson, a nephew and a head pro at numerous UK clubs and the first professional at the Longniddry Golf Club in Scotland; Jimmy Thomson, a nephew.

White worked as a caddie from the age of ten. Like many early professionals he trained as a clubmaker. From his late teens he worked as a golf professional at the North Berwick Golf Club in the summer and at York Golf Club in England in the winter.

== Golf career ==
White first played in The Open Championship in 1891 and in 1904, when it was played at Royal St George's, where he won his only major championship. He was the professional at the prestigious Sunningdale Golf Club outside London for over twenty five years from 1902.

== Death and legacy ==
White died in 1949 in Musselburgh. He is best remembered as the winner of the 1904 Open Championship.

== Major championships ==
=== Wins (1) ===
Year	Championship	54 holes	Winning score	Margin	Runners-up
1904	The Open Championship	1 shot deficit	80-75-72-69=296	1 stroke	(Scotland) James Braid, (England) J.H. Taylor

=== Results timeline ===
Tournament	1891	1892	1893	1894	1895	1896	1897	1898	1899
U.S. Open	NYF	NYF	NYF	NYF					
The Open Championship	?	11	T10	WD	T21	WD	WD	T13	2

Tournament	1900	1901	1902	1903	1904	1905	1906	1907	1908	1909
U.S. Open										
The Open Championship	4	6	18	3	1	T18	WD			

Tournament	1910	1911	1912	1913	1914	1915	1916	1917	1918	1919
U.S. Open								NT	NT	
The Open Championship	?		T35			NT	NT	NT	NT	NT

Tournament	1920	1921	1922	1923	1924	1925	1926	1927	1928	1929
U.S. Open										WD
The Open Championship		T57	WD							

Note: White only played in The Open Championship and the U.S. Open.

Win
Top 10
Did not play

NYF = Tournament not yet founded
NT = No tournament
WD = Withdrew
? = unknown
"T" indicates a tie for a place

== Team appearances ==
- England–Scotland Professional Match (representing Scotland): 1903 (winners), 1904 (tie), 1905 (tie), 1906, 1907, 1909, 1912 (tie), 1913
