= Irish Amateur Open Championship =

Golf tournament

Tournament information
- Location: Ireland
- Established: 1892
- Format: Stroke play

Current champion
- Patrick Keeling

The Irish Amateur Open Championship is an amateur golf tournament held annually in Ireland and organised by the Golf Ireland. The championship has been played as a 72-hole stroke-play event since 1958. Previously it was played as a match-play tournament.

Golf Ireland also runs the Irish Amateur Close Championship which is restricted to players born in (or with a parent born in) Ireland or, at the discretion of Golf Ireland, resident in Ireland for at least five years.

== History ==
The Golfing Union of Ireland was founded in late 1891 and organised their first championship meeting at Portrush in 1892, which included an open amateur championship. The championship was held from 7 to 9 September. There were 32 entries, with two 18-hole match-play rounds on each of the first two days and an 18-hole final on the third day. Two Scottish golfers contested the final, with Alexander Stuart beating John Andrew by one hole.

The 1893 championship was held from 13 to 15 September. There were 35 entries which meant that three preliminary matches were required. The final was extended to 36 holes. Considerable interest was added by the entry of John Ball, a three-time winner of the Amateur Championship and the 1890 Open champion. He went on to win the event, winning the final 8&7. Ball reached the final again in 1894 at Royal Dublin, this time winning the final 9&7, adding the title to the Amateur Championship he had won earlier in the year. On six occasions between 1894 and 1901, the Irish Championship Meeting included a professional tournament as well as the Amateur Championship. The 1895 championship at Portrush attracted 64 entries and the event was expanded to four days. Ball played again but lost at the last-32 stage to Ranald Gilroy, a young Scottish golfer. Gilroy lost in the semi-final to William B. Taylor who went on the win the final 13&11. Taylor retained the title in 1896, again winning the final by a large margin, this time 9&8.

Harold Hilton made his first appearance in 1897 at Royal Dublin and won the title. William B Taylor won the third time in 1898, although only beating Richard Dallmeyer at the 37th hole. All his three successes came in the absence of John Ball and Hilton. Ball and Hilton both played in 1899 at Portmarnock. Hilton was surprisingly beaten in the semi-final by John Williamson, losing at the final hole. Ball beat Williamson 12&11 in a one-sided final. Ball was unable to defend his title in 1900 as he was serving in the Second Boer War. Hilton won the title, beating Sidney Fry 11&9 in the final. Hilton retained the title in 1901 and again in 1902, his fourth win. Hilton played again at Portmarnock in 1903 but lost in the quarter-finals to local player Henry Boyd. Boyd completed the first 8 holes in 30 strokes to be 5 holes up and eventually won 3&2. Boyd became the first Irish finalist but lost a close match to George Wilkie by one hole. The 1904 final was contested between James Worthington and James Mitchell. Mitchell led by 3 holes after the morning round but Worthington won 9 of the 14 holes in the afternoon to win 6&4.

The 1905 meeting was moved to early August to try to attract more of the leading British golfers. However it failed to do so and Henry Boyd and James Mitchell, the losing finalists in 1903 and 1904 met in the 1905 final. Boyd won the match 3&2 and became the first Irish winner. Herbert Barker won in 1906, beating the 1904 champion, James Worthington, in an all-English final. Two Scots won in 1907 and 1908, Douglas Brown followed by James Mitchell, the 1904 and 1905 runner-up. Lionel Munn became the second Irish winner in 1909, beating the Scot, Robert Garson, in the final. Munn led by 5 holes after the morning round and was still 4 up with 9 holes to play. The match, however, went to the final hole, Munn winning by two holes. Munn retained the title in 1910, beating Gordon Lockhart in the final. Munn led by 8 holes after the morning round and won 9&7. Munn won the third successive time in 1911, beating Michael Scott in the final. Scott was recently returned from Australia where he had enjoyed considerable success. Munn led by one hole after the morning round but dominated in the afternoon, winning 7&6. There was an all-Scottish final in 1912, with Gordon Lockhart winning. Charles Palmer won in 1913, beating Lou Phillips, an ex-Welsh rugby union international, in the final.

The championship resumed in 1919 and was won by the English golfer Carl Bretherton who beat Tommy Armour in the final at Portrush. Political troubles in Ireland saw a reduction in the number of leading non-Irish amateurs competing and the 1920 event produced the first all-Irish final with Noel Martin winning. Martin won again in 1923 and with Charles Hezlet winning in 1926 and 1929 and Wilson Smyth, Alfred Lowe, Edwin Spiller and Roy McConnell also winning, the 1920s produced eight Irish winners. the two non-Irish winners were Tony Torrance, who won in 1925 and Seymour Noon who won in 1928. The early 1930s produced a series of non-Irish winners. William Sutton won an all-English final in 1930 and there were five successive Scottish winners from 1931 to 1935. Eric McRuvie won in 1931 with Jack McLean winning in 1932 and 1933 and Hector Thomson in 1934 and 1935. The 1936 event clashed with the Walker Cup in which McLean and Thomson were playing and the championship produced an all-Irish final won by Joe Brown. There were further Irish winners in 1937 and 1938 with wins by Johnnie Fitzsimmons and Jimmy Bruen. The 1939 event was due to start at Portmarnock on 4 September but was cancelled following the start of World War II.

The event resumed in 1946. A Scot, Alex Kyle, reached the final in 1946 but otherwise all finals from 1946 to 1957 were contested by Irish players. Joe Carr won four times and was in three other finals. Cecil Ewing won twice in 1948 and 1951, while Norman Drew won in 1952 and 1953. In an attempt to attract more overseas players, the championship became a 72-hole stroke-play event in 1958. Planned for three days in late-August it was extended to four days by bad weather, and was won by Tom Craddock. Johnny Duncan won in 1959, five strokes ahead of Archibald Gordon. In late June 1960, Portmarnock hosted the Canada Cup. The Irish close championship was moved to the late August date and the amateur open was cancelled. Later in 1960 the GUI decided to discontinue the event, despite protests from the Leinster delegates.

The event was revived at Fota Island in 1995 and was won by Pádraig Harrington. Louis Oosthuizen won in 2002 while Rory McIlroy lost in a playoff in 2006.

== Winners ==
Year	Champion	Score	Margin of victory	Runner(s)-up	Venue	Ref
2026	(Republic of Ireland) Patrick Keeling	277	1 stroke	(Republic of Ireland) David Howard	Seapoint	
2025	(Republic of Ireland) Stuart Grehan	273	Playoff	(England) Lewy Hayward	Seapoint	
2024	(Northern Ireland) Matthew McClean	273	2 strokes	(Republic of Ireland) Liam Nolan	County Sligo	
2023	(England) John Gough	280	1 stroke	(England) Dylan Shaw-Radford	The Island	
2022	(Northern Ireland) Colm Campbell	289	Playoff	(Northern Ireland) Matthew McClean	The Island	
2021	(Republic of Ireland) Peter O'Keeffe	217	Playoff	(Switzerland) Nicola Gerhardsen	European Club	
2020	Cancelled due to the COVID-19 pandemic in the Republic of Ireland					
2019	(England) James Newton	275	5 strokes	(Republic of Ireland) Conor Purcell	County Sligo	
2018	(Republic of Ireland) Robin Dawson	282	4 strokes	(Republic of Ireland) Alex Gleeson (England) John Gough	Royal County Down	
2017	(Republic of Ireland) Peter O'Keeffe	286	3 strokes	(Scotland) Chris Maclean (England) Tom Sloman	County Down	
2016	(Northern Ireland) Colm Campbell	272	1 stroke	(Republic of Ireland) Jack Hume	Royal Dublin	
2015	(Republic of Ireland) Gavin Moynihan	284	3 strokes	(Northern Ireland) Cormac Sharvin	Royal Dublin	
2014	(Scotland) Jamie Savage	288	2 strokes	(Isle of Man) Tom Gandy (Republic of Ireland) Gary McDermott (Northern Ireland) Cormac Sharvin (Netherlands) Robbie van West	Royal Dublin	
2013	(Republic of Ireland) Robbie Cannon	295	Playoff	(Republic of Ireland) Gavin Moynihan (Scotland) Graeme Robertson	Royal Dublin	
2012	(Republic of Ireland) Gavin Moynihan	295	1 stroke	(Netherlands) Robin Kind	Royal Dublin	
2011	(Wales) Rhys Pugh	294	Playoff	(Scotland) Gordon Stevenson	Royal Dublin	
2010	(Northern Ireland) Alan Dunbar	292	1 stroke	(Scotland) Kris Nicol	Royal Dublin	
2009	(Scotland) Gavin Dear	289	2 strokes	(Scotland) Wallace Booth	Royal Dublin	
2008	(Portugal) Pedro Figueiredo	278	7 strokes	(Northern Ireland) Conor Doran (England) Billy Hemstock (Scotland) Keir McNicoll	Royal Dublin	
2007	(Scotland) Lloyd Saltman	291	2 strokes	(Northern Ireland) Richard Kilpatrick	Royal Dublin	
2006	(Finland) Antti Ahokas	291	Playoff	(Northern Ireland) Rory McIlroy	Portmarnock	
2005	(Scotland) Richie Ramsay	283	2 strokes	(Republic of Ireland) Darren Crowe	Carton House (O’Meara course)	
2004	(Wales) Craig Smith	289	1 stroke	(Republic of Ireland) Sean McTernan	Carton House (Montgomerie course)	
2003	(Republic of Ireland) Noel Fox	282	2 strokes	(Wales) Stuart Manley	Royal Dublin	
2002	(South Africa) Louis Oosthuizen	283	1 stroke	(England) Paul Bradshaw	Royal Dublin	
2001	(England) Richard McEvoy	277	Playoff	(Northern Ireland) Michael Hoey	Royal Dublin	
2000	(Republic of Ireland) Noel Fox	284	3 strokes	(Republic of Ireland) Ken Kearney (Republic of Ireland) Michael McDermott	Royal Dublin	
1999	(Republic of Ireland) Gary Cullen	282	1 stroke	(Republic of Ireland) Jody Fanagan	Royal Dublin	
1998	(Northern Ireland) Michael Hoey	286	2 strokes	(Republic of Ireland) Gary Cullen	Royal Dublin	
1997	(Republic of Ireland) Keith Nolan	279	6 strokes	(Republic of Ireland) Richie Coughlan (Republic of Ireland) Noel Fox	Fota Island	
1996	(Republic of Ireland) Keith Nolan	286	2 strokes	(Republic of Ireland) Peter Lawrie	Fota Island	
1995	(Republic of Ireland) Pádraig Harrington	283	4 strokes	(Northern Ireland) Garth McGimpsey	Fota Island	
1960–94: Not played
1959	(Northern Ireland) Johnny Duncan	313	5 strokes	(Scotland) Archibald Gordon	Royal County Down	
1958	(Republic of Ireland) Tom Craddock	294	1 stroke	(Republic of Ireland) Joe Carr (Republic of Ireland) Billy Hulme	Royal Dublin	
1957	(Northern Ireland) Ian Bamford	37 holes		(Republic of Ireland) Billy Meharg	Royal Portrush	
1956	(Republic of Ireland) Joe Carr	1 up		(Republic of Ireland) James Mahon	Portmarnock	
1955	(Republic of Ireland) John Fitzgibbon	1 up		(Republic of Ireland) Billy Hulme	Royal County Down	
1954	(Republic of Ireland) Joe Carr	6 and 4		(Republic of Ireland) Cecil Ewing	Royal Dublin	
1953	(Northern Ireland) Norman Drew	4 and 3		(Republic of Ireland) Billy O'Sullivan	Killarney	
1952	(Northern Ireland) Norman Drew	5 and 4		(Northern Ireland) Cecil Beamish	Royal Portrush	
1951	(Republic of Ireland) Cecil Ewing	2 and 1		(Republic of Ireland) Joe Carr	Portmarnock	
1950	(Republic of Ireland) Joe Carr	40 holes		(Republic of Ireland) Cecil Ewing	County Sligo	
1949	(Republic of Ireland) Billy O'Sullivan	2 up		(Republic of Ireland) Brennie Scannell	Killarney	
1948	(Republic of Ireland) Cecil Ewing	1 up		(Republic of Ireland) Joe Carr	Royal County Down	
1947	(Republic of Ireland) John Burke	1 up		(Republic of Ireland) Joe Carr	Royal Dublin	
1946	(Republic of Ireland) Joe Carr	3 and 1		(Scotland) Alex Kyle	Royal Portrush	
1940–45: Not played due to World War II
1939	Cancelled due to declaration of war				Portmarnock	
1938	(Republic of Ireland) Jimmy Bruen	9 and 8		(Republic of Ireland) James Mahon	Royal County Down	
1937	(Northern Ireland) Johnnie Fitzsimmons	4 and 3		(Scotland) Robert McKinna	Royal Dublin	
1936	(Republic of Ireland) Joe Brown	39 holes		(Republic of Ireland) Billy O'Sullivan	Portmarnock	
1935	(Scotland) Hector Thomson	5 and 4		(Scotland) Jack McLean	Royal Portrush	
1934	(Scotland) Hector Thomson	3 and 2		(England) Harry Bentley	Portmarnock	
1933	(Scotland) Jack McLean	3 and 2		(England) Eric Fiddian	Royal County Down	
1932	(Scotland) Jack McLean	9 and 8		(Republic of Ireland) Joe Brown	Royal Dublin	
1931	(Scotland) Eric McRuvie	7 and 5		(Northern Ireland) Donald Soulby	Royal County Down	
1930	(England) William Sutton	4 and 3		(England) Douglas Fiddian	Portmarnock	
1929	(Northern Ireland) Charles Hezlet	1 up		(Scotland) Jack Lang	Royal Portrush	
1928	(England) Seymour Noon	1 up		(Northern Ireland) Edwin Spiller	Royal Dublin	
1927	(Northern Ireland) Roy McConnell	5 and 3		(Northern Ireland) Donald Soulby	Royal County Down	
1926	(Northern Ireland) Charles Hezlet	7 and 6		(Northern Ireland) Roy McConnell	Portmarnock	
1925	(Scotland) Tony Torrance	4 and 3		(Northern Ireland) Charles Hezlet	Royal Portrush	
1924	(Northern Ireland) Edwin Spiller	3 and 1		(Republic of Ireland) John MacCormack	Royal Dublin	
1923	(Northern Ireland) Noel Martin	1 up		(Northern Ireland) Charles Hezlet	Royal County Down	
1922	(Northern Ireland) Alfred Lowe	6 and 4		(Northern Ireland) James Henderson	Royal Portrush	
1921	(Northern Ireland) Wilson Smyth	2 up		(Republic of Ireland) Joe Gorry	Royal County Down	
1920	(Ireland) Noel Martin	6 and 5		(Ireland) Charles Robertson	Portmarnock	
1919	(England) Carl Bretherton	4 and 3		(Scotland) Tommy Armour	Royal Portrush	
1914–18: Not played due to World War I
1913	(England) Charles Palmer	4 and 3		(Wales) Lou Phillips	Royal Dublin	
1912	(Scotland) Gordon Lockhart	11 and 9		(Scotland) Patrick Jenkins	Royal County Down	
1911	(Ireland) Lionel Munn	7 and 6		(England) Michael Scott	Portmarnock	
1910	(Ireland) Lionel Munn	9 and 7		(Scotland) Gordon Lockhart	Royal Portrush	
1909	(Ireland) Lionel Munn	2 up		(Scotland) Robert Garson	Royal Dublin	
1908	(Scotland) James Mitchell	3 and 2		(Ireland) Hugh Cairnes	Royal County Down	
1907	(Scotland) Douglas Brown	2 and 1		(England) Sidney Fry	Portmarnock	
1906	(England) Herbert Barker	6 and 4		(England) James Worthington	Royal Portrush	
1905	(Ireland) Henry Boyd	3 and 2		(Scotland) James Mitchell	Royal Dublin	
1904	(England) James Worthington	6 and 4		(Scotland) James Mitchell	County Down	
1903	(Scotland) George Wilkie	1 up		(Ireland) Henry Boyd	Portmarnock	
1902	(England) Harold Hilton	5 and 3		(Scotland) William Hamilton	Royal Portrush	
1901	(England) Harold Hilton	6 and 4		(Scotland) Peter Dowie	Royal Dublin	
1900	(England) Harold Hilton	11 and 9		(England) Sidney Fry	County Down	
1899	(England) John Ball	12 and 11		(Scotland) John Williamson	Portmarnock	
1898	(Scotland) William Taylor	37 holes		(England) Richard Dallmeyer	Royal Portrush	
1897	(England) Harold Hilton	6 and 5		(Scotland) Stuart Anderson	Royal Dublin	
1896	(Scotland) William Taylor	9 and 8		(Scotland) David Anderson	County Down	
1895	(Scotland) William Taylor	13 and 11		(Scotland) John Williamson	Royal Portrush	
1894	(England) John Ball	9 and 7		(Scotland) David Low	Royal Dublin	
1893	(England) John Ball	8 and 7		(Scotland) Stuart Anderson	County Down	
1892	(Scotland) Alexander Stuart	1 up		(Scotland) John Andrew	Royal Portrush	

The 1892 final was played over 18 holes. From 1893 finals were played over 36 holes.
