= Noel Martin (British Army officer) =

British Army officer and international golfer

Brigadier Noel Martin CBE DSO MC
- Born: 23 December 1892; Portrush, County Antrim, Ireland
- Died: 24 August 1985 (aged 92)
- Burial place: St. Martin's New Cemetery, St. Martin, Guernsey, Channel Islands
- Military career
- Allegiance: United Kingdom
- Branch: British Army
- Service years: 1912–1945
- Rank: Brigadier
- Service number: 4918
- Unit: Royal Artillery
- Commands: 18th Field Regiment, Royal Artillery
- Conflicts: First World War; Second World War
- Awards: Commander of the Order of the British Empire; Distinguished Service Order; Military Cross; Mentioned in Despatches (4)

Brigadier George Noel Chadwick Martin, CBE, DSO, MC (23 December 1892 – 24 August 1985) was a British Army officer and international golfer from Northern Ireland.

== Early life and military career ==
Martin was born on 23 December 1892 in Portrush, Ireland. His father, John Charles Martin, was a doctor born in British India and trained at Trinity College, Dublin.

Martin attended the Royal Military Academy, Woolwich, and from there was commissioned into the Royal Artillery on 19 July 1912. Clement West, Colin Jardine, Harold Price-Williams and Bernard Young, all future general officers, were among his fellow graduates. On the outbreak of the First World War in August 1914, he accompanied the British Expeditionary Force (BEF) to France, and served on the Western Front from 1914 to 1918. He was awarded the Military Cross for bravery in commanding a battery under fire. The citation for The medal reads:

For conspicuous gallantry and devotion to duty while in command of his battery, when his able dispositions greatly minimised casualties at a time of persistent heavy shelling. On one occasion a direct hit was obtained on a dug-out, killing and wounding its occupants and setting fire to the camouflage and ammunition in a gun-pit. His prompt efforts were most successful in getting away the wounded and putting out the fire. Throughout the operations he set a fine example of cheerfulness and determination under very trying conditions.

He was also awarded the Distinguished Service Order for having brought a field gun into action ahead of his supporting infantry.

For conspicuous gallantry and brilliant leadership at Les Mottes on 8th November, 1918. He led a gun at a gallop through the foremost infantry, coming into action at 700 yards, silencing several machine guns which were holding up the advance. He remained in action in the open for several hours, keeping down hostile fire and denying the ridge 600 yards distant to the enemy. He also silenced, two 77 mm. guns, which were firing on the troops at about 1,500 yards range. His intrepid behaviour set a fine example.

By the end of the war, he held the rank of captain (acting major) and commanded B Battery, 74th Brigade RFA, which was serving with the Guards Division.

== Between the wars ==
After the war, Martin remained in the army, attended the Staff College, Quetta from 1926 to 1927, and became a prominent golfer. As a member of the Royal Portrush Golf Club, he won the Irish Amateur Open Championship in 1920 and 1923, and the Army golf championship in 1928. He stood in for Cyril Tolley to play in the 1928 Walker Cup as part of the British and Irish team, where he was partnered with another Portrush golfer, Major Charles Hezlet. The British and Irish team had their worst showing ever that year, losing eleven matches to one. Hezlet had been the first Irishman on a Walker Cup team, in 1924, and Martin was the second. Martin also played several international matches for Ireland, captaining the team in 1930. He later became chairman of the Royal Portrush, and headed the club at the time it hosted the 1951 Open Championship, the first time the championship had been held outside Great Britain. He presented the winner's trophy to Max Faulkner.

== Second World War ==
During the early stages of the Second World War Martin commanded the 18th Field Regiment, Royal Artillery, leading the regiment overseas to France in September 1939. The regiment formed part of the 2nd Infantry Division, then commanded by Major General Henry Loyd, which itself formed part of the British Expeditionary Force (BEF) and, not immediately engaged in combat, the regiment spent most of the "Phoney War" digging defensive positions. In February 1940 the regiment transferred from the 2nd Division to the 48th (South Midland) Infantry Division, a first-line Territorial Army (TA) formation commanded by Major General Andrew Thorne, which had recently arrived in France the month before. The policy within the BEF was for the Regular Army formations to transfer units to the TA units which, for various reasons, were not as well trained as their Regular counterparts, and this would, in theory, strengthen the Territorial formations.

Sometime after this, Martin was appointed as Commander, Royal Artillery (CRA) in the 50th (Northumbrian) Infantry Division, another TA formation which, in April 1941, moved from the United Kingdom to the Middle East. In March 1942 Martin was promoted to Brigadier Royal Artillery (BRA) of the British Eighth Army, responsible for all of the army's artillery units. He pushed heavily for centralised control of artillery, reversing an earlier policy of dispersing the guns to support small forces. This approach bore fruit at the First Battle of El Alamein in July 1942, where concentrated artillery helped stall a German advance into Egypt. However, in August, Martin was sacked and sent home; the new Eighth Army commander, Lieutenant General Bernard Montgomery, blamed him for the previous policy of dispersion and wished to replace him with a new officer. Martin's successor was Brigadier Sidney Kirkman, one of Montgomery's protégés, later to command a corps in Italy and become a full general.

== Postwar ==
Martin retired from the army in 1945. He was made a Commander of the Order of the British Empire for his services in the Middle East, and mentioned in despatches. He died in 1985, aged 92, and is buried at St. Martin's New Cemetery, St. Martin, Guernsey, Channel Islands.

== Bibliography ==
- Converse, Alan (2011). Armies of Empire: The 9th Australian and 50th British Divisions in Battle 1939–1945. Cambridge University Press. ISBN 978-0521194808.
- Hammond, Bryn (2012). El Alamein: The Battle That Turned the Tide of the Second World War. Osprey. ISBN 9781849086400.
