= 66th Light Anti-Aircraft Regiment, Royal Artillery =

66th Light Anti-Aircraft Regiment, RA
- Royal Artillery cap badge
- Active: 1 December 1940 – 15 April 1945
- Country: United Kingdom
- Branch: British Army
- Role: Air defence
- Size: Regiment
- Part of: 3 AA Brigade; 2 AA Brigade; 52 AA Brigade; Arkforce
- Garrison/HQ: Belfast
- Engagements: Belfast Blitz; Operation Husky; Italian Campaign; Greek Civil War

Commanders
- Notable commanders: Lt-Col Charles Hezlet, DSO

66th Light Anti-Aircraft Regiment, Royal Artillery, was an air defence unit of the British Army formed in Northern Ireland during World War II. It served in the Belfast Blitz and then defended 'Hellfire Corner' in East Kent. Later it participated in the Allied invasion of Sicily and the campaign in mainland Italy. Late in the war it was converted into a transport unit that saw active service in the Greek Civil War.

== Organisation ==
102nd Heavy Anti-Aircraft Regiment, Royal Artillery, was forming in Antrim, Northern Ireland, just as World War II broke out in September 1939. Originally raised as part of the Territorial Army, it was immediately embodied for service. It consisted of three heavy anti-aircraft (HAA) batteries and was joined by two light anti-aircraft (LAA) batteries, 175 and 176, which were formed and regimented on 10 September 1939. The new regiment formed part of 3 AA Brigade defending Northern Ireland in 3rd AA Division.

On 1 June 1940 those AA regiments equipped with 3-inch or heavier guns were termed Heavy Anti-Aircraft (HAA); this included 102nd AA Regiment, despite its hybrid HAA/LAA organisation. However, 175 and 176 LAA Batteries left the regiment on 1 December 1940 to form a separate 66th Light Anti-Aircraft Regiment, Royal Artillery at Belfast.

The new regiment was under the command of Major Charles Hezlet, a prominent golfer who had been commissioned into the Antrim Royal Garrison Artillery (Special Reserve) before World War I and won a DSO while commanding a siege battery in 1918. He had been re-commissioned on the outbreak of World War II and was now promoted to Lieutenant-Colonel. Regimental Headquarters (RHQ) was established in Derryvolgie Avenue, Belfast.

The regiment had a few obsolescent 3-inch guns used in the LAA role, otherwise it was equipped with Lewis guns. On formation it was provided with a number of Z Battery 3-inch unguided rocket projectors and in January 1941 the first 12 Bofors 40 mm guns arrived, together with 146 Z Battery who landed at Larne to man the rocket projectors at Belfast and Portaferry.

A second LAA regiment now arrived in Belfast to join 3 AA Bde: 64th LAA Rgt, which had been formed the previous November at Watchet AA Practice Camp in Somerset with three batteries, 194, 195 and 196. On 28 March 1941 the D Troops of each of these batteries was detached and combined to form a new 251 LAA Battery for 66th LAA Rgt:

- D/194 Trp became A/251 Trp
- D/195 Trp became B/251 Trp
- D/196 Trp became C/251 Trp
- D/251 Trp was newly formed in Northern Ireland

At the end of the month 176 LAA Bty concentrated a troop of four Bofors guns to defend Larne Harbour.

12 AA Division's formation sign

== Belfast Blitz ==
AA Command rapidly expanded during the Battle of Britain and the following Luftwaffe night campaign against UK cities known as the Blitz. Five new AA divisions were created on 1 November 1940, including 12th AA Division, which was formed by separating responsibility for Northern Ireland and the industrial areas of Western Scotland from 3rd AA Division. 3 AA Brigade came under the command of this new formation.

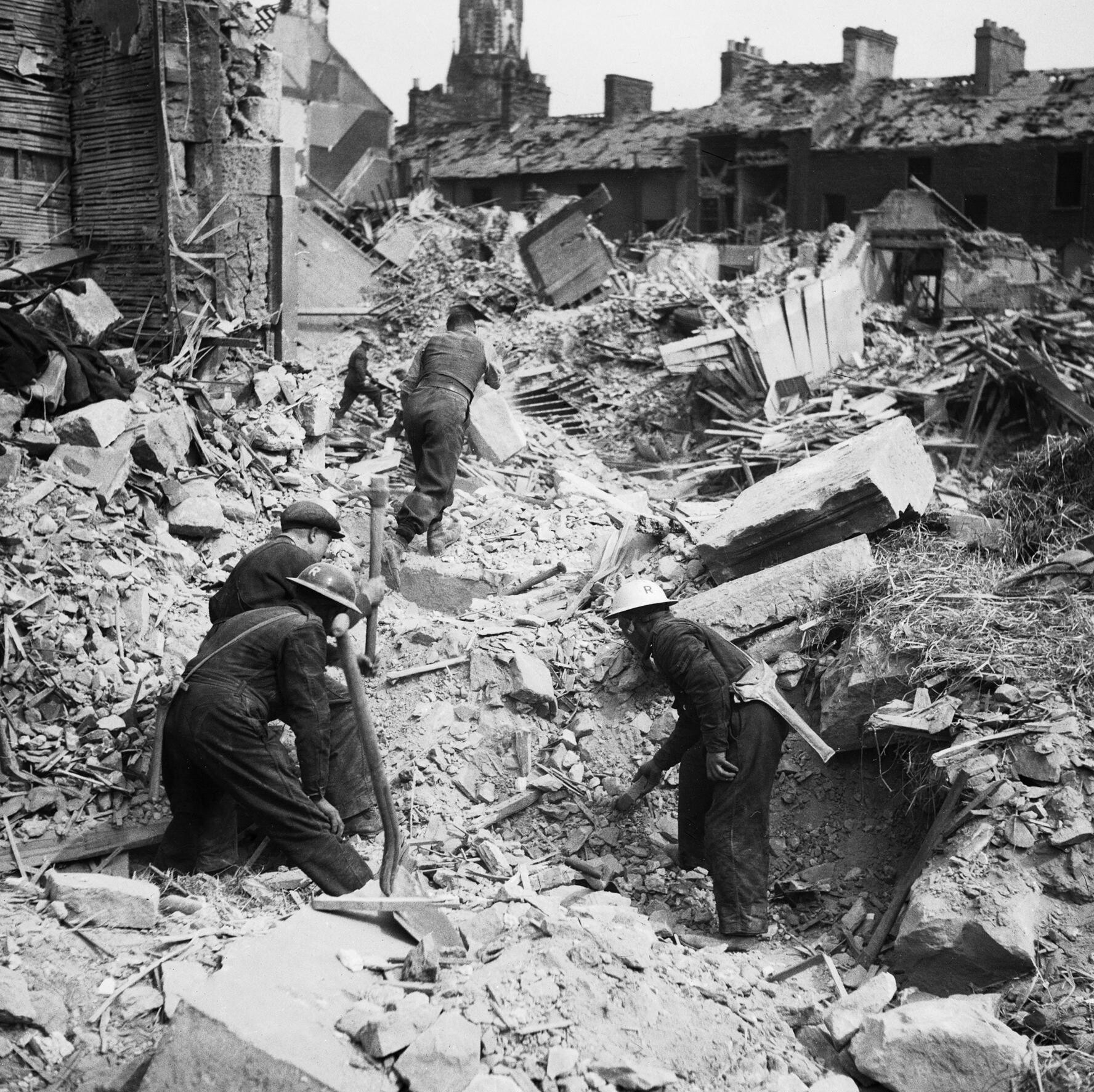
Rescue workers searching through rubble after an air raid on Belfast.

Although its shipyards made Belfast an important target, the city did not receive a major bombing raid until nearly the end of the Blitz. All the LAA batteries around the city were in action on 8 April. Then on the nights of 14/16 April and 4/5 May there were severe raids on the city (the Belfast Blitz) causing widespread damage and loss of life. There was considerable damage at Woodvale Camp on 14/16 April, and the men of 146 Z Bty had to be accommodated at Clonaver Camp. During the prolonged May raid the LAA guns fired fixed barrages under the control of the Gun Operations Room (GOR). On this occasion the regiment suffered a direct hit on a Lewis gun position with the death of three men, and considerable damage to 175 LAA Bty's HQ at Clonaver Camp. After May 1941, there were only rare incursions by the Luftwaffe, though the strength of Northern Ireland's AA defences steadily increased.

66th LAA Regiment shuffled its positions in the summer of 1941, with RHQ taking over 176th LAA Bty's HQ at Tyrone House in Malone Road, Belfast, while 251 LAA Bty's HQ moved into Derryvolgie Avenue from Portaferry, and then went to Tullycleagh House at Ballinamallard in the south-west of the province, commanding gunsites around Lough Erne. In September 176th LAA Bty moved to St Columb's House, Derry. The regiment also had guns stationed at RAF Aldergrove. The regiment supplied a cadre of experienced officers and men to provide the basis for a new 276 LAA Bty formed by 234th LAA Training Rgt at Carlisle on 12 June 1941. Once it had completed its training, 276 LAA Bty joined 66th LAA Rgt on 19 September to replace 251 LAA Bty, which transferred to the command of 84th LAA Rgt forming in Glasgow.

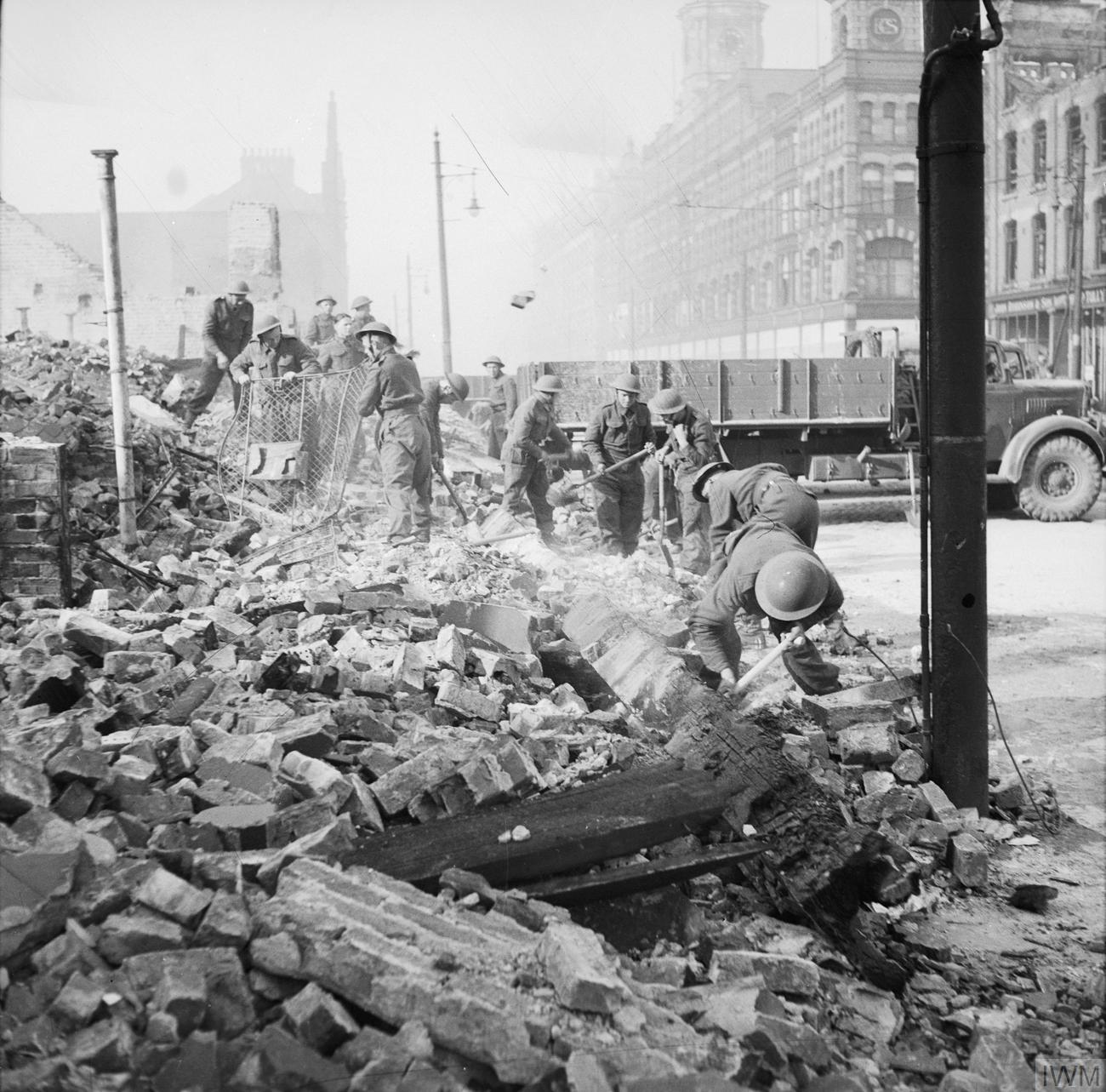
Troops clearing rubble after the May air raid on Belfast.

In the autumn of 1941 the regiment was able to send detachments to practice camps for live firing, and new Bofors guns and Kerrison Predictors were arriving. A large draft of 147 reinforcements arrived at Belfast from the training regiments in October and a regimental school was set up to complete their training; personnel of 146 Z Bty helped man the operational sites while the instructors were absent. In mid-October the regiment was deployed as follows:

- 175 LAA Bty:
  - Lough Erne – 16 x Bofors
- 176 LAA Bty:
  - Derry and Lisahally – 12 x Bofors
  - Limavady – 2 x Bofors
  - Aldergrove – 4 x Bofors
- 276 LAA Bty:
  - Belfast – 2 x Bofors, 4 x 3-inch Naval guns
  - Larne – 2 x Bofors, 6 x Lewis (used as training sites for the reinforcement draft)

== Mobile training ==
On 24 December 1941 66th LAA Rgt was rostered for overseas service and the batteries began intensive mobile training with infantry units, handing over some of the gunsites to 201 LAA Rgt of 84th LAA Rgt. The reinforcement draft was absorbed and then all the men of lower medical categories were posted to the D Trp of each battery, which were then detached to form a new 459 LAA Bty on 19 February 1942. This battery would remain in AA Command when the regiment went overseas. A draft of 160 drivers and motor mechanics also arrived.

On 20 April 1942 the regiment with its three mobile batteries handed over to 81st LAA Rgt and embarked at Larne to travel to the AA Mobile Training Centre at Gillingham, Kent, while 459 LAA Bty went to Epping, Essex. The regiment completed its training at Gillingham in May and as was normal practice was loaned back to AA Command until its next training period. It came under the command of 56 AA Bde, shortly afterwards transferring 71 AA Bde, and was deployed to Vulnerable Points (VPs) in East Kent:

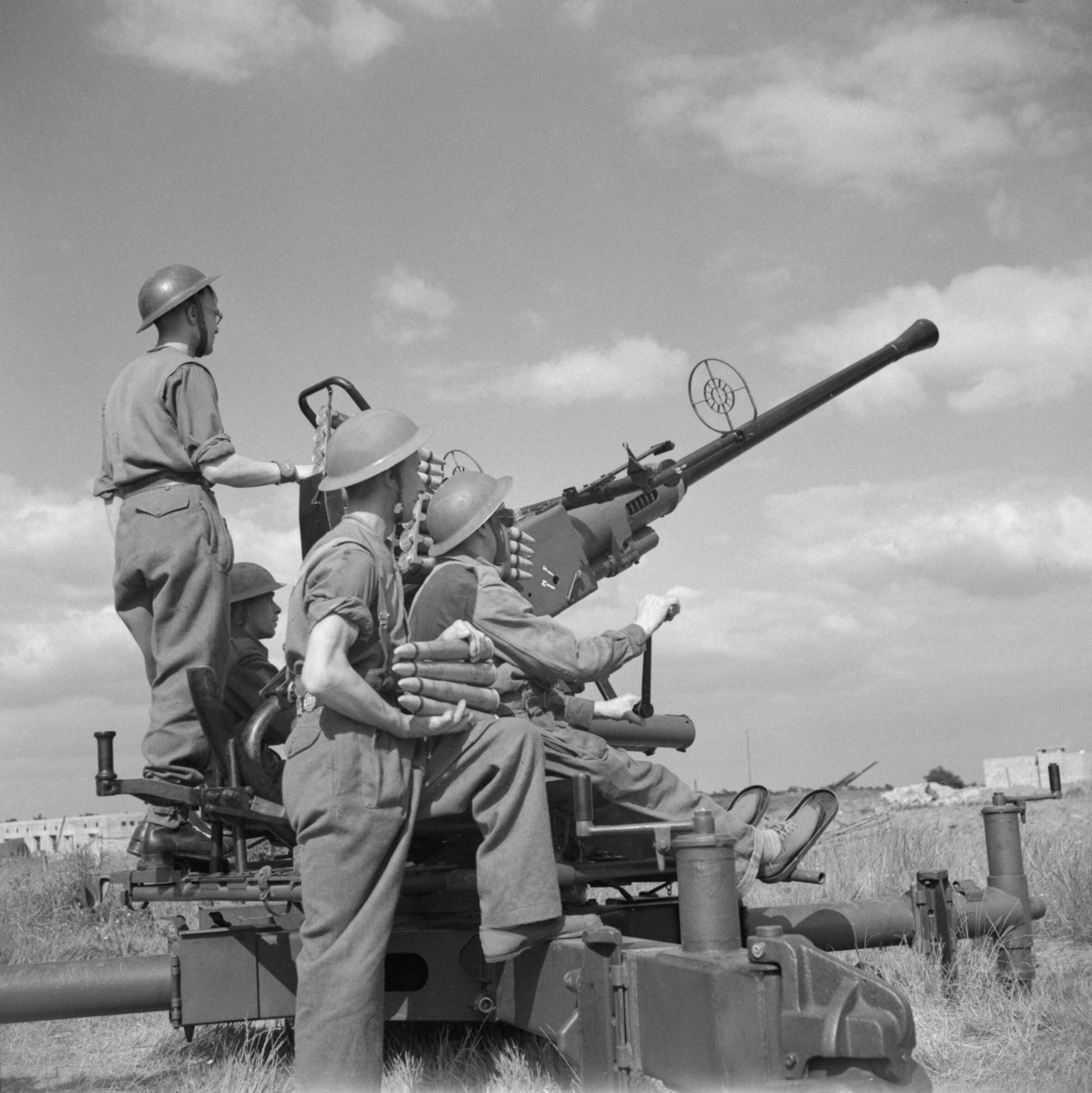
A Royal Artillery Bofors gun and crew keep watch in Southern England.

- RHQ at Upton House, Shepherdswell, Dover, later at Quarry Down, Hythe
- BHQ 175 LAA Bty at The Vicarage, Womenswold
  - Dunkirk Radar Station
  - Dover Coast Defences
  - RAF Lympne (4 guns)
- BHQ 176 LAA Bty at The Old Rectory, Betteshanger
  - Dover Radar Station
  - Dover Harbour
- BHQ 276 LAA Bty at Hill House, Minster
  - RAF Manston
  - Ramsgate Harbour
- BHQ 459 LAA Bty at Rye, East Sussex
  - Rye Harbour
  - Rye Radar Station
  - RAF Lympne (4 guns)
- 69 LAA Bty, 4th LAA Rgt, Royal Canadian Artillery (attached)
  - Chislit Colliery
  - Betteshanger Colliery
  - Tilmanstone Colliery

This was a period of 'hit and run' raids by Luftwaffe fighter-bombers against coastal targets and the LAA guns were in regular action. Dover was under occasional shelling from German long-range guns, which had gained the area the nickname of 'Hellfire Corner'; the regiment suffered some damage from these. Lt-Col Hezlet handed over command to Lt-Col E.S. Law during May, and 459 LAA Bty left on 14 July to join a newly-formed 140th LAA Rgt.

On 15 September 1942 the regiment handed over all its operational commitments and underwent a period of battle training. It then returned to AA Command for a few weeks dispersed across Hampshire and along the Sussex coast (where C Trp of 176 Bty at Littlehampton claimed a hit on a raider). At the end of October the regiment received its attached workshop section of the Royal Army Ordnance Corps (later renamed Royal Electrical and Mechanical Engineers or REME) and moved to a mobilisation centre at Easthampstead Park Camp where it took over its full complement of guns (18 x Bofors per battery) and vehicles. On 16 November Lt-Col P.A. Grandage took command of the regiment, which attended an LAA practice camp at Stiffkey in Norfolk. 66th LAA Regiment completed its mobilisation on 31 December. It then moved to Scotland to take part in various training exercises. On 18 February 1943 it received a warning order for a move to a tropical climate.

== Sicily ==
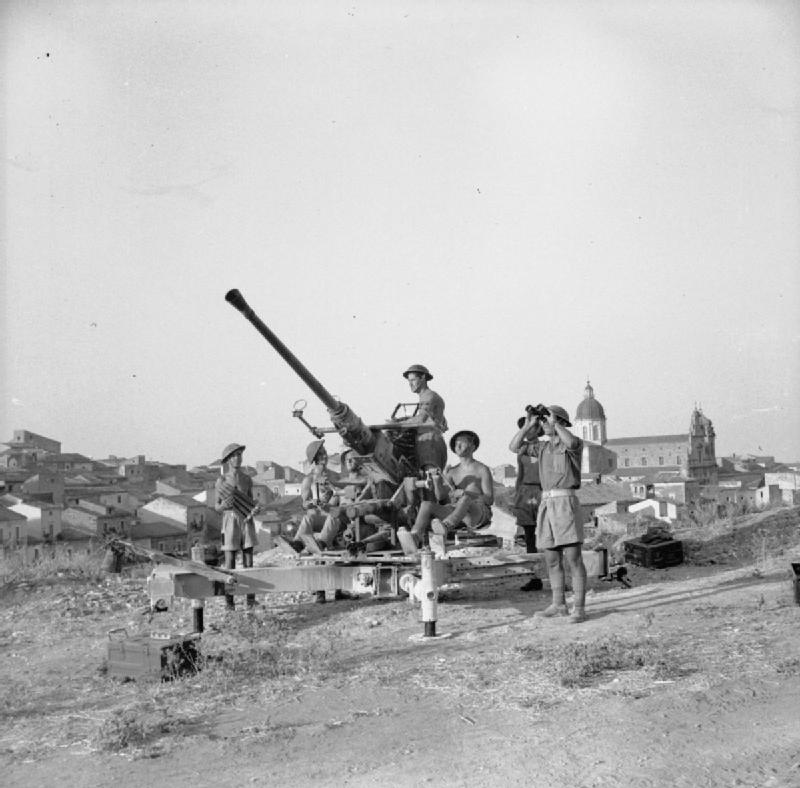
A Royal Artillery Bofors gun team on alert in Sicily, 16 July 1943.

The regiment's personnel embarked aboard HM Transport F10 on 13 March 1943 and arrived at Port Tewfik in Egypt on 6 May. It was issued with 36 US-pattern Bofors guns and a few vehicles, and attended a practice camp near Alexandria. It now came under the command of 2 AA Bde, which was assigned a role in the planned Allied invasion of Sicily (Operation Husky). First, in early June the guns and equipment were shipped to Haifa in Palestine and Beirut in Lebanon, then the personnel entrained for Suez, where on 30 June 175 and 176 LAA Btys boarded HM Transports Empire Trooper and Duchess of Bedford, while the main body (RHQ, REME, Royal Signals and 276 LAA Bty) boarded the Orbita. These transports steamed up the Suez Canal to Alexandria, where the men were given four days ashore before re-embarking and joining the convoy to Sicily, which included the transports from Haifa and Lebanon.

The regiment watched the bombardment of Syracuse from its transports on D Day (10 July) and a reconnaissance party landed at the town after its capture next day. The regiment began landing on 13 July, when 176 LAA Bty immediately deployed 12 guns to defend the port; these were in action that night. Further guns were landed and deployed on 14 July, in time for the regiment to fire about 3000 rounds each night against heavy air raids on 14/15 and 15/16 July. By the end of 16 July the whole regiment was ashore and setting up defensive barrages in conjunction with the AA Defence Commander (AADC) and AA Operations Room (AAOR). That night another 10,000 rounds were fired against aircraft dropping Parachute mines in the harbour. Enemy air activity over Syracuse declined somewhat as Eighth Army pressed north and captured Augusta, though one attack on 24/25 July set a ship on fire in the harbour, and groups of Focke-Wulf Fw 190s dive-bombed the harbour in daylight. A Troop of 276 LAA Bty had already moved north to provide AA defence for Eighth Army HQ. 2 AA Brigade HQ also went to Augusta, leaving 66th LAA Rgt under the command of newly arrived 62 AA Bde HQ.

The regiment spent August defending Syracuse against 'slight air activity' while the ground troops completed the capture of Sicily and prepared for the assault crossing of the Straits of Messina (Operation Baytown) on 3 September. Once Eighth Army was established on the 'toe' of Italy, 276 LAA Bty was moved up, first on 17 September to defend Messina, and then back to Augusta. The war having moved on, the regiment caught up on some training, including anti-tank practice, while the rear parties and transport arrived from Egypt. In November it carried out mobile training. By now the regiment was under the command of the Royal Marines' Mobile Naval Base Defence Organisation (MNBDO). When this too was closed down and 73 AA Bde took over at the beginning of January 1944, 66th LAA Rgt was redeployed, with 175 LAA Bty covering Gerbini Airfield, 176 in Syracuse, and 276 at Catania Airfield, while RHQ and the REME workshop moved from Syracuse to Catania.

== Italy ==
On 9 February 1944 the regiment was ordered to move to join 22 AA Bde at Naples. The advance party and 175 LAA Bty crossed the Straits of Messina on 15 February, but en route they were diverted to rejoin 62 AA Bde guarding the Foggia Airfield Complex. These airfields were being used by the US Fifteenth Air Force and No. 205 Group RAF. The regiment deployed as follows:

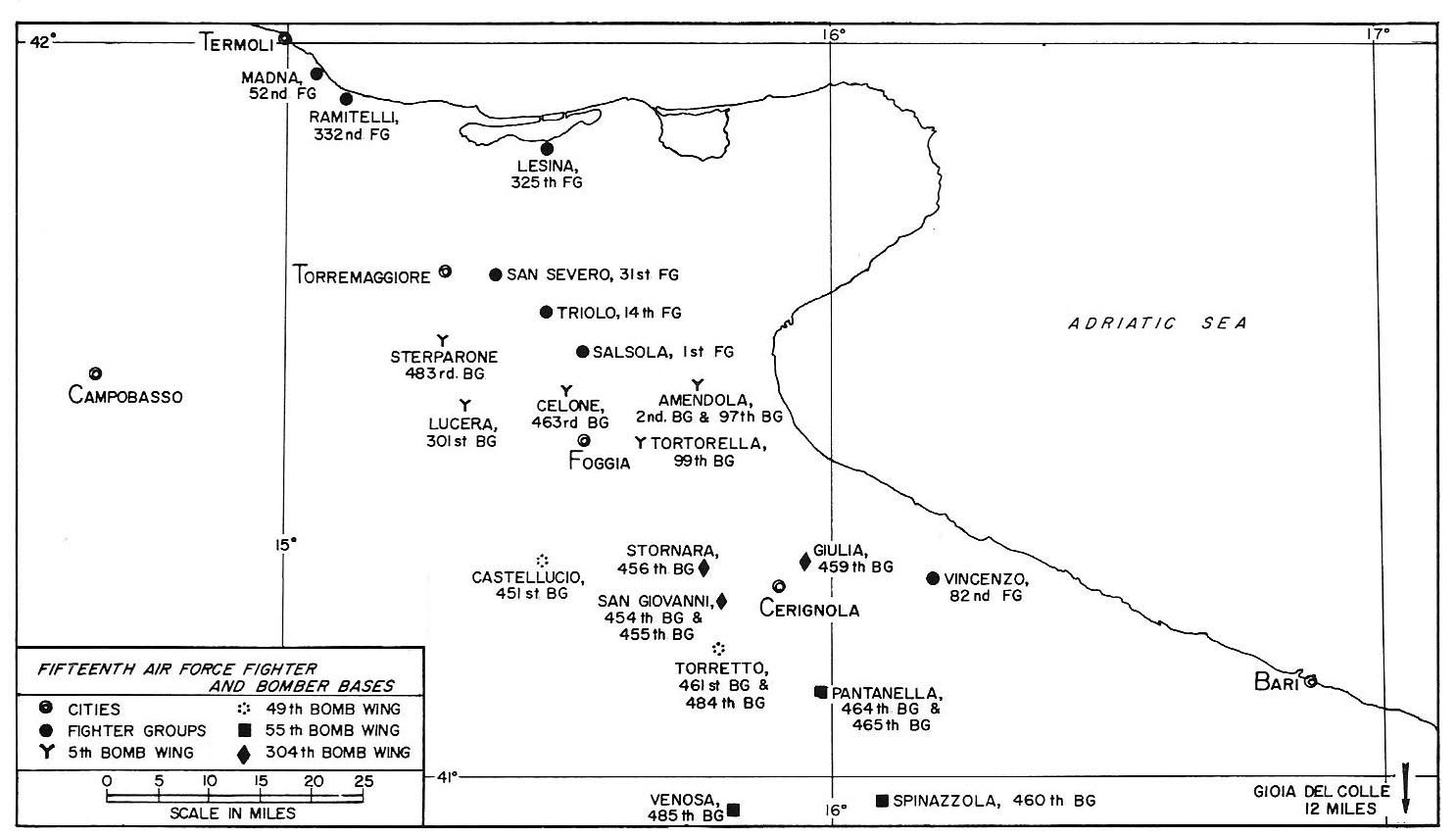
US Fifteenth Air Force airfields around Foggia.

- RHQ: Foggia
- 175 LAA Bty: Serracapriola
  - Amendola main landing ground
- 176 LAA Bty: Lucera, later Foggia
  - Sterparone Airfield, then Amendola satellite landing ground, later Pantanella Airfield (2 Trps)
  - Triolo Airfield (1 Trp)
- 276 LAA Bty: Fania
  - Lesina Airfield, later Tortorella Airfield (2 Trps)
  - San Severo Airfield (1 Trp)
- REME Workshop: Torremaggiore

(The airfields at Lesina and Sterparone were not actually in use at the time because of mud, and the troop at San Severo was flooded out of its initial positions.)

In April a new brigade HQ, 52 AA Bde, arrived in Italy and took command of the impressive concentration of AA defences assembled for Foggia and other airfields. This change brought with it some redeployment, with A/175 Trp taking over at Vincenzo, then moving to Ramitelli, B/176 Trp moving to Foggia Main, C/176 Trp to Stornara and A/276 Trp to Castelluccio. (Note: In 1944 the Army Council ordered Troops to be re-lettered from A–C within each battery to A–I throughout the regiment: 66th LAA Rgt changed on 15 May to A–C (175 Bty), D–F (176 Bty) and (G–I) 276 Bty.) Minor shuffling between the various airfields continued during May, but there was no action, the Luftwaffe in Italy having been reduced to a skeleton force. In July, 276 LAA Bty was withdrawn from Foggia and sent to defend Naples, but all three batteries did little more than practice shoots during the summer.

By now, while the AA requirement for the rear areas was diminished, the British Army was undergoing a manpower shortage, so surplus AA personnel began to be diverted to other roles. On 3 September 66th LAA Rgt was ordered to cease AA operations and to take up transport duties for Force 140 being prepared to go to Greece, where the German withdrawal was well under way. The regiment exchanged over 250 of its gunners for drivers from the RA Training Depot and from 29th and 64th LAA Rgts in 52 AA Bde. Each battery was to have 88 Dodge and Bedford 3-ton lorries, 28 of its own or taken from other AA regiments, the remainder to be sent direct to Greece by Middle East Forces. The exchanges of personnel and vehicles were quickly completed and the regiment concentrated at the port of Taranto on 11 September.

== Greece ==
Force 140 (later renamed Arkforce after its commander, Brigadier Robert Arkwright) consisted of a parachute brigade from Italy and an armoured brigade (without tanks) from Egypt. They were to land in Greece (Operation Manna) to 'show the flag' in Athens, disarm the Greek security battalions established under German occupation, open up ports for relief supplies, and generally to act as arbitrators in local disputes. Operation Manna began on 12 October with parachute landings while Arkforce began landing from Royal Navy cruisers at Piraeus on 16 October 66th LAA Regiment loaded its 3-tonners and REME workshop aboard the Norman Castle and 25 3-ton water trucks on a Landing Ship Tank (LST), while RHQ and the bulk of the personnel embarked on HMS Ajax. The follow-up vehicles went aboard the Fort Frobisher and personnel on HM Transport Worcestershire. The Royal Signals maintenance detachment left the regiment and was posted to the signals training depot.

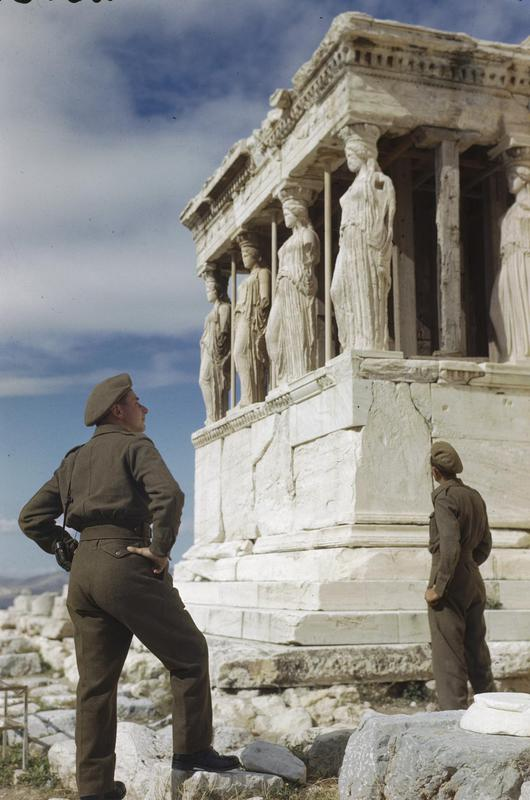
British troops sightseeing in Athens, October 1944, before the outbreak of the Dekemvriana.

HMS Ajax arrived at Piraeus on 15 October and landed the troops next day; RHQ was established at a flour mill in the town. Next day was spent unloading the vehicles from the Norman Castle. 66th LAA Regiment brought with it the stores and rations for 2nd Parachute Brigade ('Pompforce'), and the elements of a complete Bailey bridge. The regiment dismounted the water tanks from the converted 3-tonners, which went up-country to Pompforce's base at Skiathos for the reoccupation of Salonika. Meanwhile, the rest of the regiment continued unloading vehicles at Piraeus and established battery HQs in Faliron, while the second-in-command, Maj C.J. Bateman, took control of the Greek civil transport pool. During November the rest of the men and vehicles arrived from Italy and the Middle East, and the regiment carried out general transport duties for Arkforce around Athens and for relief supplies to the interior.

However, in December the former partisans of the Greek People's Liberation Army (ELAS) refused to be disarmed and clashes broke out with their rivals of the National Republican Greek League (EDES), the so-called Dekemvriana. The movement of relief supplies was stopped by a general strike. On 5 December Arkforce was ordered to clear ELAS out of the Athens–Piraeus area. 66th LAA Regiment was left in the dark, relying on BBC broadcasts for information, but increased its guards and sentries and prepared platoons of 30 lorries for troop movements, one for duty with 23rd Armd Bde and one taking reinforcements from Piraeus docks into Athens. Next day 139 Infantry Bde HQ arrived and took control of the Piraeus and Faliron area, including 66th LAA Rgt, which was ordered to find foot patrols as well as its transport duties, which included sending lorries to collect British detachments cut off in the city and supplying rations to the Greek Police and National Guard. The REME workshop was brought in from the garage in Athens here it had been based and was now in the heart of ELAS activity. Two drivers were captured by ELAS but persuaded their captors that they were carrying food and were released; two other lorries with their drivers were cut off in Piraeus until the end of the month, and an ambulance driver was wounded in Athens. There were further casualties on the night of 7/8 December, and patrols were stepped up between Faliron and Kalamaki airfield. ELAS positions overlooked the main road from Faliron to Athens, so convoys could only travel at night under tank escort, and there were patrol skirmishes between 66th LAA Rgt and ELAS. Bitter fighting broke out in the centre of Athens, and on 12/13 December ELAS attacked 23 Armd Bde's HQ, where Capt J.R.G. Holland-Smith of 66th LAA Rgt was killed and a number of gunners were captured. Brig Arkwright later commended the regiment for the 'gallant show' they put on in that fight, and also for 'running the gauntlet' with the supply convoys. 66th LAA Regiment was made responsible for coordinating the ground defences of the base at Faliron.

The Supreme Allied Commander designate, Gen Harold Alexander and the British Minister, Harold Macmillan, flew into Kalamaki and were taken by armoured car to Athens, where they found the British force 'beleaguered' in the city with only three days' ammunition. However, the arrival of reinforcements by air and sea allowed the force to keep open the lines of communication to the airfield and port, while the reinforcing infantry ('Blockforce') cleared the Piraeus peninsula. Infantry units took over the defence of Faliron under Lt-Col Grandage's command ('Granforce') and on the night of 17/18 December operations began to advance up the road and link up the British positions. Daily convoys to Athens resumed and the regiment's lorries cleared the backlog of supplies that had piled up at the docks and airfield. ELAS began withdrawing from central Athens on 27 December, and on 29 December all the drivers who had brought the lorries from Egypt for 66th LAA Rgt were sent back there guarding some 1500–2000 ELAS Prisoners of War.

The British forces in Athens began an offensive against ELAS on 2 January 1945, during which 66th LAA Regiment suffered minor casualties to men and vehicles from artillery fire. ELAS retreated from Athens on 5 January, and the regiment could reduce its patrols, although fighting went on in other parts of the country. The supply convoys ranged widely in support of these operations and of the Royal Engineers' bridging activity. ELAS released its prisoners and they returned to the regiment.

On 13 February 1945 the regiment was warned that it was to be disbanded and reformed as general transport (GT) companies of the Royal Army Service Corps (RASC). This was completed on 15 April 1945, when the regiment became 769 and 770 (GT) Companies RASC.

== External sources ==
- Orders of Battle at Patriot Files
