= Sidney Fry =

English billiards and snooker player and golfer

Sidney Harold Fry
Personal information
- Born: 1869 Liverpool, Lancashire, England
- Died: 3 September 1961 (aged 92) Isleworth, Middlesex, England

Sport
- Country: England
- Sport: Snooker

Sidney Harold Fry (1869 – 3 September 1961) was an English amateur billiards and snooker player and amateur golfer.

He won the English Amateur Billiards Championship eight times between 1893 and 1925 and the English Amateur Snooker Championship in 1919, becoming the first player to win both titles. He was the author of "Billiards for amateurs".

In golf he was runner-up in the Amateur Championship in 1902 and twice runner-up in the Irish Amateur Open Championship. He was a regular competitor in the Amateur Championship, playing 25 times between 1898 and 1931. He finished 14th in the 1902 Open Championship at Royal Liverpool Golf Club.

== Results in major championships ==
Tournament	1898	1899
The Open Championship		CUT
The Amateur Championship	QF	R32

Tournament	1900	1901	1902	1903	1904	1905	1906	1907	1908	1909
The Open Championship			14		CUT					
The Amateur Championship	R16	R32	2	R128	R128	R128	R32	R128	R64	R128

Tournament	1910	1911	1912	1913	1914	1915	1916	1917	1918	1919
The Open Championship		WD				NT	NT	NT	NT	NT
The Amateur Championship	R64	R32	R64	R256	R128	NT	NT	NT	NT	NT

Tournament	1920	1921	1922	1923	1924	1925	1926	1927	1928	1929
The Open Championship										
The Amateur Championship	R256	R256	R32	R128			R256	R256	R64	

Tournament	1930	1931
The Open Championship		
The Amateur Championship		R256

Note: Fry only played in The Open Championship and The Amateur Championship.

Top 10
Did not play

NT = No tournament
WD = withdrew
CUT = missed the half-way cut
R256, R128, R64, R32, R16, QF, SF = Round in which player lost in match play

Source for British Open: www.theopen.com

Sources for British Amateur:

Source for 1910 British Amateur: The Glasgow Herald, 1 Jun 1910, pg. 10.

Source for 1911 British Amateur: The Glasgow Herald, 1 Jun 1911, pg. 10.

Source for 1912 British Amateur: The American Golfer, July, 1912, pg. 198.

Source for 1913 British Amateur: The Glasgow Herald, 27 May 1913, pg. 14.

Source for 1914 British Amateur: The Glasgow Herald, 20 May 1914, pg. 12.

Source for 1920 British Amateur: The Glasgow Herald, 8 Jun 1920, pg. 12.

Source for 1921 British Amateur: The Glasgow Herald, 24 May 1921, pg. 3.

Source for 1922 British Amateur: The Glasgow Herald, 26 May 1922, pg. 12.

Source for 1923 British Amateur: The Glasgow Herald, 9 May 1923, pg. 13.

Source for 1927 British Amateur: The Glasgow Herald, 24 May 1927, pg. 10.

Source for 1928 British Amateur: The Glasgow Herald, 24 May 1928, pg. 3.

Source for 1931 British Amateur: The Glasgow Herald, 19 May 1931, pg. 17.

== Team appearances ==
- England–Scotland Amateur Match (representing England): 1902, 1903 (winners), 1904, 1905, 1906, 1907, 1909
