= English Amateur Championship =

Annual snooker tournament

Tournament information
- Country: England
- Established: 1916
- Organisation(s): English Partnership for Snooker & Billiards
- Format: Amateur event
- Recent edition: 2026
- Current champion: (England) Ashley Carty

The English Amateur Championship is an annual snooker competition, the highest-ranking and most prestigious amateur event in England. It is also the oldest and longest-running snooker tournament in the world, having been established in 1916, three years before the standard rules of the game were first formulated in 1919 by the Billiards Association and Control Club and 11 years before the first World Snooker Championship.

Five winners of the tournament later became world champion: John Pulman, Ray Reardon, John Spencer, Terry Griffiths and Stuart Bingham. Three of the losing finalists—Joe Johnson, John Parrott and Ronnie O'Sullivan—also lifted the world title as professionals.

== History ==
=== 1916 ===
The first Championship was held at Orme's Rooms, Soho Square, London starting on Monday 28 August and finishing on Tuesday 6 September, with no play at the weekend. The event was promoted by the Billiard Association in aid of the Sportsman's Motor Ambulance Fund. Matches consisted of three frames with all frames played out. The winner was based on the aggregate points over the three frames. The winner of a frame received an additional 12½ points. 21 players entered. Except on the last day, there were three matches per day, two in the afternoon and one in the evening. The first semi-final was on the evening of 5 September and resulted in a win for H. Sefton. Sefton won convincingly and his opponent conceded after two frames. In the second semi-final, played the following afternoon, Charles Jaques also won easily, again playing only two frames after his opponent conceded. In the final Jacques won two of the three frames and won by a score of 202 to 140½. The highest break reported during the championship was a 30 clearance. Despite the fact that the event was raising money for a war-time cause, a few of the competitors chose to play under an alias, including the winner, who played as "E A Jay".

=== 1917 ===
The second Championship was again held at Orme's Rooms in Soho Square. It was held from Monday 19 February to Wednesday 28 February, with no play at the weekend. The event took the form of a "challenge" event with the winner of the qualifying event challenging the reigning champion, (Charles Jaques). As in 1916 the winner was based on the aggregate points. Early matches were over three frames. However, unlike the previous year, there was no bonus for winning a frame. 20 players entered. The final of the challengers' competition was played over five frames on 27 February between "T N Palmer" and F Donohue. "Palmer" won 280 to 211, winning four of the five frames. "T N Palmer" was an alias used by Harry Hutchings Lukens (1883–1941), an American businessman who worked for DuPont. Lukens had also played in the 1916 event, losing in the quarter-finals. The final was played over seven frames, with four frames in the afternoon and three in the evening. Jaques won five of the seven frames, winning by a score of 330 to 296, despite Lukens winning the last frame 60 to 29. The highest break reported was where "Cooke once took all the pool balls in a break of 27." There was sufficient interest that a photograph of Jacques appeared in the "Daily Mirror".

=== 1918 ===
The third Championship was again held at Orme's Rooms in Soho Square. It was held from Wednesday 6 March to Tuesday 19 March, with no play at the weekend. The event took the same form as in 1917 except that there were only two matches per day. 19 players competed, including Sam Mayo "the well-known comedian". Mayo won two matches but had to scratch in his semi-final match against Harry Lukens. Defending champion Charles Jaques was on active service and had been shot through the wrist and hence unable to defend his title. This meant that the winner of the challengers event took the title. The final was between Harry Lukens and Sidney Fry. Lukens won five of the seven frames and won the match 390 to 301, winning the championship at his third attempt.

=== 1919 ===
The fourth Championship was again held at Orme's Rooms in Soho Square. It was held from Monday 31 March to Wednesday 9 April. There was a record entry of 29. Sidney Fry beat Arthur Wisdom 166 to 117 in the challengers final and gained the right to play Harry Lukens. In the final Lukens won four of the seven frames but Fry won by a score of 387 to 300.

=== 1920 ===
The fifth Championship was held at Burroughes Hall in Soho Square. It was held from Monday 23 February to Tuesday 2 March. The challenge format was dropped. Generally four matches were played each day. Defending champion Sidney Fry lost on the first evening. Just two days earlier he had won the Amateur Billiards Championship for the sixth time. In the final Arthur Wisdom beat F S Miller by 356 to 283, winning five of the seven frames.

=== 1921 ===
The sixth Championship was again held at Burroughes Hall in Soho Square. It was held from Monday 21 February to Tuesday 1 March. There were 26 entries. On the final day, M J Vaughan from Coventry beat the holder, Arthur Wisdom, in the semi-final by a score of 180 to 152. Vaughan then played Sidney Fry in the final. At the interval the match was close with Fry leading by 8 points. The match continued to be tight with everything depending on the final black. Vaughan potted it and won the match 384 to 378.

=== 1922 ===
The seventh Championship was again held at Burroughes Hall in Soho Square. It was held from Monday 27 February to Monday 6 March. The semi-finals were played on the Saturday. Jack McGlynn, then living in Nottingham, beat C Cox junior from Gravesend 423 to 301 in the final, winning 5 of the 7 frames. In the two frames he won, Cox only led by 7 and 4 points and McGlynn was a convincing winner.

=== 1923 ===
The eighth Championship was held at Burwat Hall in Soho Square. It was held from Monday 5 March to Saturday 17 March. Walter Coupe, from Leicester, beat Jack McGlynn in the semi-final, winning all three frames. Coupe played W Forshall from London in the final. Coupe won 6 of the 7 frames, winning 432 to 337. The American champion, J Howard Shoemaker, was unable to play, having had an appendix operation on the second day of the tournament.

=== 1924 ===
The ninth Championship was again held at Burwat Hall in Soho Square. It was held from Monday 3 March to Wednesday 12 March. There were 24 entries. If a match ended tied on points the winner would be decided on frames won. Defending champion Walter Coupe narrowly won his quarter-final against Fred Morley 147 to 143 despite losing two of the three frames. Harford Olden beat Sidney Fry in the first semi-final while Walter Coupe beat H Crosland in the other. In the final Coupe won 5 of the 7 frames, winning 413 to 333 to retain the title. He had built up a winning lead of 107 in the afternoon session, winning all four frames.

=== 1925 ===
The tenth Championship was again held at Burwat Hall in Soho Square. It was held from Monday 9 March to Monday 16 March. WL Crompton from Blackpool scored the first recorded 50 break in the last frame of his match against JH Forster. Crompton then easily beat Walter Coupe by a score of 236 to 39. In the final Jack McGlynn, the 1922 champion, beat Crompton 392 to 309 winning 4 of the 7 frames. After the afternoon session McGlynn held a 3-point lead but won the evening session by 171 to 84.

=== 1926 ===
The eleventh Championship was again held at Burroughes Hall in Soho Square. It was held from Monday 15 March to Tuesday 23 March. In the final W Nash of London won the first two but Fred Morley won the next two. Nash led by 228 to 204 mainly thanks to winning the first frame 75 to 36. Morley won two of the three evening frames but Nash won on aggregate by 383 to 356,

=== 1927 ===
There were two important changes for the twelfth Championship. Firstly, the results of matches were in future based on frames won, not aggregate points. Secondly, a system of regional qualifying was introduced. With this new system there was a big in entries – 68, of which 22 were from London. Two players qualified from the London section with one each from 11 "provincial sections". The London section matches and the final stages were held at Burroughes Hall in Soho Square. The final stages started on Wednesday 23 February with one match each afternoon and evening with the final played on Wednesday 2 March between Ollie Jackson from Birmingham and Tony Casey from Liverpool. Jackson won two of the three afternoon frames and won the match 4–2.

=== 1928 ===
For the thirteenth Championship, matches in the final stages were extended to 7 frames with the final being over 9 frames. The finals were held outside London for the first time, being held at Camkin's Hall in Birmingham. There were 40 entries. As in 1927 there were two qualifiers from London and one from the other sections. 11 players qualified for the finals which started on Monday 27 February with the final on Saturday 3 March. Pat Matthews from Bristol played Frank Whittall from Birmingham in the final. Matthews led 3–1 before Whitall won the next three frames to lead. Matthews won frame 8 and then won the final frame 53–48 "after a great struggle" to win the match 5–4.

=== 1929 ===
49 players entered the fourteenth Championship. The finals were again held at Camkin's Hall in Birmingham from 4 to 9 February. Laurie Steeples from Rotherham beat Frank Whittall from Birmingham. Whittles led 4–3 but Steeples won the last two to take the Championship.

=== 1930 ===
The 1930 Championship was held at Thurston's Hall for the first time. Previous holders of the championship since 1920 who had retained their amateur status were given exemption to the final stages, but no other players could get a walk-over to the finals. 52 players entered, including previous winners Walter Coupe, Pat Matthews and Laurie Steeples. 10 players qualified, who played in 5 first-round matches, the winners joining the 3 past winners in the quarter-finals. The finals were held from 24 March to 5 April. Laurie Steeples met Frank Whittall in the final for the second successive year. Steeples won all 4 frames in the afternoon session and won 5–1.

=== 1931 ===
The final stages of the 1931 Championship were again held at Thurston's Hall. There were 41 entries, including previous winners Pat Matthews and Laurie Steeples. 9 players qualified: the 2 previous winners who entered, 2 from the London section and 5 from other sections. The final stages immediately followed the London section qualifying, starting on 24 April. Heats were reduced to 5 frames with the final over 9 frames. Steeples had to withdraw as he was on the way to Australia to play in the Empire Amateur Billiards Championship in which Sydney Lee was also competing. Pat Matthews met Harry Kingsley in the final on 29 April, Matthews winning by 5 frames to 4.

=== 1932 ===
The final stages of the 1932 Championship were again held at Thurston's Hall. Previous winners Ollie Jackson and Pat Matthews entered and were joined by 2 qualifiers from London and 7 other qualifiers. The final stages were from 2 to 7 May. In the final William Bach beat Ollie Jackson 5–3. In the 8th frame Bach cleared the last five colours to tie the scores and then won the frame on the respotted black.

Following the match, Bach, a commercial traveller from Birmingham, was arrested on a charge of obtaining £50 by false pretences. Bach had forged two cheques in the name of a well-known Birmingham bookmaker and used them to obtain money from the assistant manager of the Midland hotel in Birmingham. Bach was sentenced to four months hard labour. He had been short of money and could not otherwise have played in the Championship. The prosecutor said he must be a man of iron nerves because police officers arrived while the final was in progress. Bach had been in prison before. In July 1924 he had been sentenced to 5 years penal servitude for attempting to cause grievous bodily harm, having held a loaded gun to the neck of a Mr Kohn. Bach had married Mr Kohn's daughter in Gretna Green and as a consequence "a feeling of bitterness was engendered." The marriage was annulled in 1927 on the grounds that the pair had not been resident in Scotland for the required 21 days prior to the marriage.

=== 1933 ===
The final stages of the 1933 Championship were held at Thurston's Hall. 50 players entered including previous winner Pat Matthews. The final stages were from 25 to 28 May. In the final Edward Bedford beat Albert Kershaw 5–1.

=== 1940 ===
42 players entered the War-time Championship which were held at Burroughes Hall from 8 April to 3 May. There were no qualifying contests. Matches were over 5 frames with the semi-finals over 7 frames and the 2-day final over 15 frames. Kingsley Kennerley met Albert Brown in an all-Birmingham final. Brown led 7–5 but Kennerley won the last 3 frames to win 8–7.

=== 1946 ===
The final stages of the 1946 Championship were held at Burroughes Hall. 88 players entered of which 12 qualified for the final stages from 11 to 22 March. Heats were the best of 9 frames with final over 11 frames. John Pulman, from Exeter, beat Albert Brown, from Birmingham, 6–2 in the final. Pulman led 3–2 after the 3-hour afternoon session and won the first three frames in the evening. Both players turned professional soon afterwards. By a strange coincidence the two met in the first match of the 1947 World Snooker Championship qualifying competition, also at Burroughes Hall, from 2 to 4 January 1947. Albert Brown led 14–9 after two days and took a winning 18–9 lead on the final day. Brown beat Kingsley Kennerley, the 1937 and 1940 Amateur Champion, in the final of the qualifying competition and advanced to the quarter-finals.

=== Later championships ===
Alex Davies became the youngest winner in the history of championship in 2003 at the age of 15 years and 10 months.

== Winners ==
Year	Winner	Runner-up	Final score
1916	Charles Jaques	H. Sefton	202–140½ (2–1)
1917	Charles Jaques	(United States) Harry Lukens	330–296 (5–2)
1918	(United States) Harry Lukens	(England) Sidney Fry	390–301 (5–2)
1919	(England) Sidney Fry	(United States) Harry Lukens	387–300 (3–4)
1920	(England) Arthur Wisdom	F. S. Miller	356–283 (5–2)
1921	(England) M. J. Vaughan	(England) Sidney Fry	384–378 (4–3)
1922	(England) Jack McGlynn	(England) C. Cox	423–301 (5–2)
1923	(England) Walter Coupe	(Northern Ireland) E. Forshall	432–337 (6–1)
1924	(England) Walter Coupe	(England) Harford Olden	413–333 (5–2)
1925	(England) Jack McGlynn	(England) W. L. Crompton	392–309 (4–3)
1926	(England) W. Nash	(England) Fred Morley	383–356 (3–4)
1927	(England) Ollie Jackson	(Republic of Ireland) Tony Casey	4–2
1928	(England) Pat Matthews	(England) Frank Whittall	5–4
1929	(England) Laurie Steeples	(England) Frank Whittall	5–4
1930	(England) Laurie Steeples	(England) Frank Whittall	5–1
1931	(England) Pat Matthews	(England) Harry Kingsley	5–4
1932	(England) William Bach	(England) Ollie Jackson	5–3
1933	(England) Edward Bedford	(England) Albert Kershaw	5–1
1934	(England) Charles Beavis	(England) Pat Matthews	5–2
1935	(England) Charles Beavis	(England) Duggie Hindmarch	5–3
1936	(England) Pat Matthews	(England) Charles Beavis	5–3
1937	(England) Kingsley Kennerley	(England) William Dennis	6–3
1938	(England) Pat Matthews	(England) Kingsley Kennerley	6–1
1939	(England) Percy Bendon	(England) Kingsley Kennerley	6–4
1940	(England) Kingsley Kennerley	(England) Albert Brown	8–7
1941–1945 No competition due to World War II
1946	(England) John Pulman	(England) Albert Brown	6–2
1947	(England) Harold Morris	(England) Charley Kent	6–1
1948	(England) Sidney Battye	(England) Tommy Postlethwaite	6–4
1949	(England) Tommy Gordon	(England) Sydney Kilbank	6–4
1950	(England) Alf Nolan	(Wales) Gary Owen	6–5
1951	(England) Rex Williams	(England) Percy Bendon	6–1
1952	(Northern Ireland) Charles Downey	(England) Jack Allen	6–1
1953	(England) Tommy Gordon	(England) George Humphries	6–5
1954	(England) Geoff Thompson	(Wales) Cliff Wilson	11–9
1955	(England) Maurice Parkin	(England) Alf Nolan	11–7
1956	(England) Tommy Gordon	(Wales) Ray Reardon	11–9
1957	(England) Ron Gross	(England) Stan Haslam	11–6
1958	(Wales) Marcus Owen	(England) Jack Fitzmaurice	11–8
1959	(Wales) Marcus Owen	(England) Alan Barnett	11–5
1960	(England) Ron Gross	(England) John Price	11–4
1961	(England) Alan Barnett	(England) Ray Edmonds	11–9
1962	(England) Ron Gross	(England) Jonathan Barron	11–9
1963	(Wales) Gary Owen	(England) Ron Gross	11–3
1964	(Wales) Ray Reardon	(England) John Spencer	11–8
1965	(England) Pat Houlihan	(England) John Spencer	11–3
1966	(England) John Spencer	(Wales) Marcus Owen	11–5
1967	(Wales) Marcus Owen	(England) Sid Hood	11–4
1968	(England) David Taylor	(Scotland) Chris Ross	11–6
1969	(England) Ray Edmonds	(England) Jonathan Barron	11–6
1970	(England) Jonathan Barron	(England) Sid Hood	11–10
1971	(England) Jonathan Barron	(England) Doug French	11–9
1972	(England) Jonathan Barron	(England) Ray Edmonds	11–9
1973	(Wales) Marcus Owen	(England) Ray Edmonds	11–6
1974	(England) Ray Edmonds	(Republic of Ireland) Patsy Fagan	11–4
1975	(England) Sid Hood	(England) Willie Thorne	11–6
1976	(Scotland) Chris Ross	(Wales) Roy Andrewartha	11–7
1977	(Wales) Terry Griffiths	(England) Sid Hood	13–3
1978	(Wales) Terry Griffiths	(England) Joe Johnson	13–6
1979	(England) Jimmy White	(England) Dave Martin	13–10
1980	(Republic of Ireland) Joe O'Boye	(England) Dave Martin	13–9
1981	(England) Vic Harris	(England) George Wood	13–9
1982	(England) Dave Chalmers	(England) Malcolm Bradley	13–9
1983	(England) Tony Jones	(England) John Parrott	13–9
1984	(England) Steve Longworth	(Wales) Wayne Jones	13–8
1985	(England) Terry Whitthread	(Scotland) Jim McNellan	13–4
1986	(England) Anthony Harris	(England) Geoff Grennan	13–9
1987	(England) Mark Rowing	(England) Sean Lanigan	13–11
1988	(England) Barry Pinches	(England) Craig Edwards	13–6
1989	(England) Nigel Bond	(England) Barry Pinches	13–11
1990	(Northern Ireland) Joe Swail	(Scotland) Alan McManus	13–11
1991	(England) Steve Judd	(England) Ronnie O'Sullivan	13–10
1992	(England) Stephen Lee	(England) Neil Mosley	13–8
1993	(England) Neil Mosley	(England) Eddie Barker	8–5
1994	(England) Matthew Davies	(England) Michael Rhodes	8–5
1995	(England) David Gray	(England) Paul Hunter	8–7
1996	(England) Stuart Bingham	(England) Peter Lines	8–4
1997	(England) David Lilley	(England) Robert Marshall	8–7
1998	(England) Tim Bailey	(England) Craig Butler	8–3
1999	(England) David Lilley	(England) Andrew Norman	8–5
2000	(England) Nick Marsh	(England) David Lilley	8–5
2001	(England) Luke Fisher	(England) Sunit Vaswani	8–4
2002	(England) Martin Gould	(England) Craig Taylor	8–6
2003	(England) Alex Davies	(England) Ben Woollaston	8–7
2004	(England) David Lilley	(England) Wayne Cooper	8–6
2005	(England) David Grace	(England) Andy Symons-Rowe	8–3
2006	(England) Mark Joyce	(England) Martin O'Donnell	8–3
2007	(England) Martin Gould	(England) David Lilley	8–7
2008	(England) David Grace	(England) Ben Hancorn	9–7
2009	(England) Jimmy Robertson	(England) David Craggs	9–8
2010	(England) Jack Lisowski	(Republic of Ireland) Leo Fernandez	9–2
2011	(Republic of Ireland) Leo Fernandez	(England) John Whitty	10–6
2012	(England) Gary Wilson	(England) Martin O'Donnell	10–9
2013	(England) Stuart Carrington	(England) Ben Harrison	10–2
2014	(England) Ben Harrison	(England) Antony Parsons	10–6
2015	(England) Michael Rhodes	(England) Billy Joe Castle	10–6
2016	(England) Jamie Bodle	(England) Wayne Townsend	10–9
2017	(England) Billy Joe Castle	(England) David Lilley	10–7
2018	(England) Joe O'Connor	(England) Andrew Norman	10–3
2019	(England) Brandon Sargeant	(England) Jamie O'Neill	10–7
2020	(England) Ben Hancorn	(Jamaica) Rory McLeod	5–3
2022	(England) Jamie Curtis-Barrett	(England) John Welsh	10–5
2023	(England) Paul Deaville	(Republic of Ireland) Leo Fernandez	6–2
2024	(England) Steven Hallworth	(England) Callum Downing	6–4
2025	(England) Zachary Richardson	(England) Antony Parsons	6–2
2026	(England) Ashley Carty	(Moldova) Vladislav Gradinari	6–0

== Records ==
The following players have won the tournament more than once: Pat Matthews (4), Marcus Owen (4), Jonathan Barron (3), Ron Gross (3), David Lilley (3), Charles Beavis (2), Walter Coupe (2), Ray Edmonds (2), Tommy Gordon (2), Martin Gould (2), David Grace (2), Terry Griffiths (2), Charles Jaques (2), Kingsley Kennerley (2), Jack McGlynn (2), Laurie Steeples (2).

David Lilley has reached the final on six occasions (winning 3/6).

The following players have been in the final on five occasions: Pat Matthews (4/5), Marcus Owen (4/5), Jonathan Barron (3/5), Ray Edmonds (2/5).
