= The Royal Dublin Golf Club =

Second oldest golf club in Ireland, located on North Bull Island

- Location in Dublin
- 53.3568°N 6.1707°W

Club information
- Location: Bull Island, Dublin, Ireland
- Established: 1885, 141 years ago
- Type: Private
- Total holes: 18
- Tournaments: Irish Open (1931, 1936, 1950, 1984, 1985, 1986)
- Website: theroyaldublingolfclub.com
- Designed by: Harry Colt, Martin Hawtree
- Par: 72
- Length: 7,269 yards (6,647 m)
- Course record: Marco Penge (64, 2016)

The Royal Dublin Golf Club, founded in 1885, is Ireland's third oldest golf club. It is a private members' club, with an 18-hole links course on Bull Island, Dublin, Ireland. The championship routing that we recognise today was by designed by Harry Colt in the 1920s. Over a three-year period from 2004 the links was extended under the guidance of golf architect Martin Hawtree.

== History ==
=== Origins and early locations ===
The Royal Dublin Golf Club was instituted at a meeting held at No. 19 Grafton Street in May 1885, pioneered by a Scottish banker - John Lumsden. Originally called Dublin Golf Club, it received its Royal designation in 1891 under a British royal charter, when there were 250 members paying an £2 annual subscription (after an entrance fee of 8 guineas). It was originally located near the Magazine Fort in the Phoenix Park, moved to Sutton after a year, and finally in 1889 moved to its present home on North Bull Island (the name may be derived from the locality, Clontarf, which in Gaelic is Cluain Tairbh meaning the Meadow of the Bull).

=== Bull Island ===
Captain William Bligh of Mutiny on the Bounty fame was, in the early 19th century, one of those invited to solve the long-standing problems of providing shipping with a safe, straight and deep approach into Dublin. As a result, it was decided to build a sea wall three kilometres out from the shore. The resulting sand bank, Bull Island, still continues to grow. The timber bridge was built in the autumn of 1819 and the Great North Wall, more popularly known as the Bull Wall, was completed by 1823. The club owns the entire links, covering 65 hectares.

During the First World War, the course was taken over by the military and used as a rifle and artillery range, and after the War, the clubhouse was in a very dilapidated condition and the course severely damaged. With £10,000 compensation from the military, and starting in 1919, 64 firing ranges were disassembled by hand, the clubhouse was re-constructed and the links course was redesigned by H. S. (Harry) Colt, the world-famous golf course architect from Sunningdale.

On the night of 2 August 1943, the Clubhouse was totally destroyed by fire. Due to delays in finalising development plans for Bull Island, it was not until ten years later that the new clubhouse was opened.

=== 21st century ===
Early in the 2000s the membership of the club decided to carry out a renovation of the Colt design. Martin Hawtree was engaged to modernise the classic out-and-back layout. Hawtree's work, delivered between 2004 and 2006 saw the creation of two new holes, the significant raising of the majority of green sites and the addition of around 450 yards to the length of the course, bringing it to 7,268 yards.

In 2019 the firm of Clayton, de Vries and Pont (CDP) was engaged to audit the course bunkering scheme. The audit investigated the possibility of returning the overall bunker style to something more fitting with the clubs Colt design heritage.

In 2022 club members voted to approve the CDP recommendations, works are due to commence in November 2022 lasting several months.

== Location ==
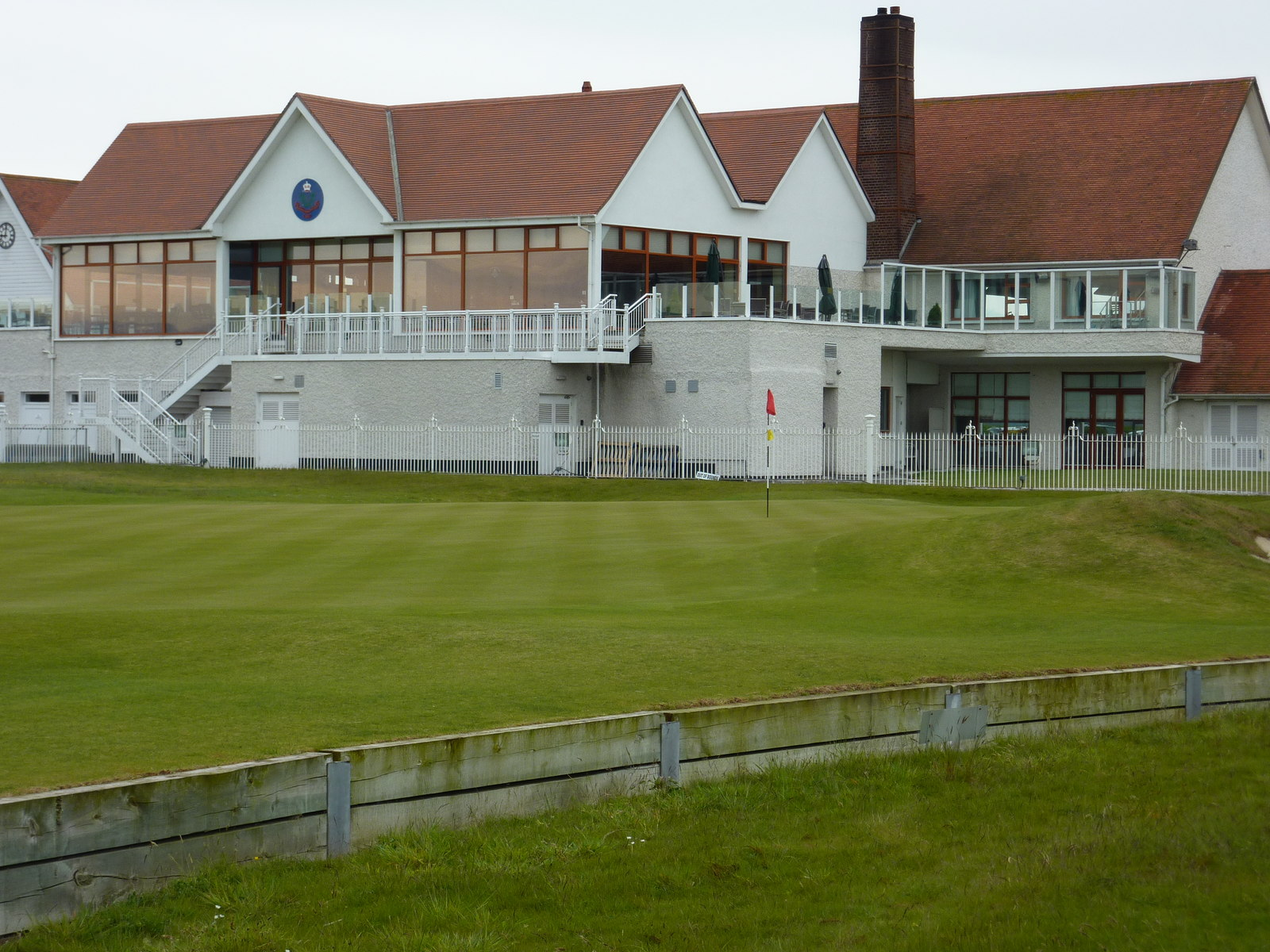
The Royal Dublin Golf clubhouse

The club is on Bull Island in Dublin Bay. Accessed at one end via an old wooden bridge, or via a modern causeway mid-way along, Bull Island is a sand bank formed as a result of the construction of a sea wall in the 19th century. The club occupies lands from the causeway to the centre of Bull Island to the Bull Wall, running from Clontarf to Raheny. The clubhouse and main entrance are at the Clontarf end, and a service entrance at the Raheny end. The club owns its grounds, while the rest of the island is city property, including the Wooden Bridge and Bull Wall, which previously belonged to Dublin Port.

== Events ==
The Royal Dublin has held the Irish Open six times - in 1931, 1936, 1951, 1983, 1984, and 1985. The Royal Dublin hosted the Irish Amateur Open for the first time in 1894, when it was won by J. Ball Jr. of Royal Liverpool and on many occasions since including continuously since 1998 with the exception of three years when the course was undergoing reconstruction. The club regularly welcomes participants in GUI cups and shields.

The club has won the Barton Cup, the most prestigious competition in Leinster golf, on five occasions: for the first time in 1946 and again in 1951, 1967, 1979 and 2006.

== Famous visitors ==
In 1890, just five years after its inception, the Club moved to its current home on Bull Island in Dublin Bay. The links made an immediate impact on the golfing world. Perhaps the greatest pioneer in the history of the game, Old Tom Morris, came to Royal Dublin and played two matches here on 7 June 1894. Also in that year, Royal Dublin hosted its first championship event, the Irish Amateur Open.

The list of golfers who have played the links is long and distinguished, and includes winners like Ian Woosnam, Ian Baker-Finch, Curtis Strange, Sandy Lyle, Corey Pavin, Bob Charles and Wayne Grady. In addition, television commentator David Feherty won his first professional tournament at Royal Dublin - the 1980 Irish National PGA Championship. Royal Dublin hosted the tournament from 1978 through 1980 and was won by Christy O'Connor, Des Smyth and David Feherty respectively. The tournament continues to this day as the Irish PGA Championship which was won by Padraig Harrington the week before both of his British Open victories. Since then the greatest golfers in the world - both professional and amateur - have come to play in some of Ireland's tournaments at the links.

Famous non-professional golfers who have visited the club, include former Taoiseach Bertie Ahern, the former Presidents of Ireland, Mary Robinson and Mary McAleese, and a former President of the United States, Bill Clinton.

== Controversy ==
The club has faced public criticism for restrictions on membership for women. The club website does not specifically mention restrictions for female members, however a 2017 Irish Times article highlighted the club's restrictive policy with respect to female members in the context of recent changes internationally, with the Royal and Ancient Golf Club at St. Andrews's in Scotland ending its policy banning female members in 2014.

In 2021, the members of Royal Dublin Golf Club voted to amend the club's constitution to allow for female membership.

== See also ==
- List of golf clubs granted Royal status
- Golf in Ireland
- List of organisations based in the Republic of Ireland with royal patronage
