= Charles Hezlet =

Irish golfer and soldier

Personal information
- Full name: Charles Owen Hezlet
- Nationality: Northern Ireland
- Born: 16 June 1891 Sheerness, Kent, England
- Died: 22 November 1965 (aged 74) East Grinstead, Sussex, England

Career
- Sport: Golf
- Status: Amateur

Best results in major championships
- Masters Tournament: DNP
- PGA Championship: DNP
- U.S. Open: DNP
- The Open Championship: 17th: 1928
- British Amateur: 2nd: 1914

Charles Owen Hezlet, DSO (16 May 1891 – 22 November 1965) was an Irish amateur golfer and part-time soldier. He was runner-up in the 1914 Amateur Championship and was in the British Walker Cup team in 1924, 1926 and 1928.

== Military career ==
Hezlet was commissioned into the part-time Antrim Royal Garrison Artillery (Special Reserve) in 1911, served during World War I and won a DSO while commanding a siege battery in 1918. He ended the war with the rank of major. The citation for his DSO, which appeared in The London Gazette in July 1918, reads as follows:

For most conspicuous gallantry and devotion to duty during an enemy attack. He kept his guns firing and encouraged his men until the enemy were within 300 yards of the battery. He remained at his post though the enemy's barrage had passed beyond the battery, and the machine-gun fire was very severe. Every round in the battery was fired. He gave a very fine example of coolness, courage and efficiency.

He was re-commissioned on the outbreak of World War II and on 1 December 1940 he took command of the newly-formed 66th Light Anti-Aircraft Regiment, Royal Artillery, at Belfast. Shortly afterwards he was promoted to lieutenant-colonel and commanded the regiment during the Belfast Blitz, He remained in command until May 1942, after the regiment had crossed to Kent to train for active service overseas.

== Golf career ==
In 1914 he was runner-up in the Amateur Championship, losing 3&2 to James Jenkins. He was also runner-up in the 1923 and 1925 Irish Amateur Open Championship and the 1923 Welsh Open Amateur Championship. He won the Irish Amateur Open Championship in 1926 and 1929 and was in the Walker Cup team in 1924, 1926 and 1928. He was also a member of a team of four amateurs that played in South Africa in 1927/28.

=== Amateur wins ===
- 1920 Irish Amateur Close Championship
- 1926 Irish Amateur Open Championship
- 1929 Irish Amateur Open Championship

=== Results in major championships ===
Tournament	1928	1929	1930
The Open Championship	17		CUT

Note: Hezlet only played in the Open Championship.

Did not play

CUT = missed the half-way cut

=== Team appearances ===
Amateur

- Walker Cup (representing Great Britain): 1924, 1926, 1928

== Family ==
Hezlet had three sisters who were also well-known amateur golfers: May, Violet and Florence. Hezlet married Annie Maitland Stuart in 1920. She died of pneumonia in Cannes, France, in 1931 aged 30.
