= Irish Championship Meeting Professional Tournament =

Series of golf tournaments played in Ireland

Tournament information
- Location: Ireland
- Established: 1894
- Month played: September
- Final year: 1901

Final champion
- Sandy Herd

The Irish Championship Meeting Professional Tournament was a series of golf tournaments played in Ireland. The Irish Championship Meeting had been instituted in 1892 by the Golfing Union of Ireland. The main event was the Irish Amateur Open Championship but in a number of years a professional tournament was also held at the meeting. A total of 6 tournaments were held between 1894 and 1901.

Andrew Kirkaldy won the first of these tournaments, in 1894 at Royal Dublin Golf Club. The 1895 and 1896 tournaments were won by Sandy Herd, while Willie Fernie won in 1897. There was no tournament in 1898 but at Portmarnock Golf Club in 1899 Harry Vardon won convincingly, beating J.H. Taylor 13 & 11 in the final. The final tournament was held at Royal Dublin Golf Club in 1901 and was won by Sandy Herd who beat Harry Vardon by 1 hole, having been 6 down after the morning round.

== History ==
The 1894 Irish Championship Meeting was held at the Royal Dublin Golf Club, Dollymount from 4 to 8 September. A handicap event was held on the first day with the Irish Amateur Open Championship taking place on the next three days. On the final day, a Saturday, the Royal Dublin Club arranged a 36-hole stroke-play tournament for both amateurs and professionals with total prize money of £50. There were 10 prizes, with the first 5 of these being available to both amateurs and professionals, the remaining 5 being for professionals only. Since professionals occupied the first five places, none of the prize money went to the amateurs. The Kirkaldy brothers, Andrew and Hugh, led after the first round with scores of 78. George Pulford, an English professional, was the brothers' only challenger in the second round. He scored 76 but finished a shot behind Hugh Kirkaldy and took third prize. John Ball, who had won the Irish Amateur Open Championship the previous day, was the leading amateur, although 11 strokes behind the winner.

In 1895, the Irish Championship Meeting was held at the Royal Portrush Golf Club from 10 to 14 September. The Irish Amateur Open Championship was held from 10 to 13 while a professional tournament was held over three days, from 12 to 14. The professional event was a knockout match-play event. With 32 entries, two rounds were played on each of the first two days with a 36-hole final on the final day, a Saturday. Prize money was provided by the Portrush club and totalled £100 with 16 prizes. A consolation event for the professionals and amateurs was held on the last day with further prize money of £20. On the first day of the professional event Harry Vardon beat both the Kirkaldy brothers, Andrew 5&4 in the morning and then Hugh 5&3 in the afternoon. The final was between Vardon and Sandy Herd. The match was always close but Herd eventually won by 1 hole. Peter McEwan Sr., who had travelled from England for the tournament, arrived on 10 September but collapsed as he was getting out of his carriage at the club house and died. He was travelling with son David. David and his brothers Douglas and Peter withdrew from the tournament.

The 1896 Irish Championship Meeting was held at the County Down Golf Club from 8 to 12 September. An informal competition was held on the first day with the Irish Amateur Open Championship on 9 to 11 September. The professional tournament was held from 10 to 12. Total prize money was £100 with £40 for the winner and 7 other prizes. The first day of the professional event consisted of 36-hole stroke-play with the leading 8 qualifying for the match-play stage. Ben Sayers led the qualifiers on 155. Sandy Herd met Harry Vardon in one of the quarter-final matches with Herd winning 2&1. Sayers and Herd met in the 36-hole final. Herd led by 2 holes after the morning round and eventually won 4&3.

The 1897 Irish Championship Meeting was held at the Royal Dublin Golf Club, Dollymount from 31 August to 4 September. The Irish Amateur Open Championship was on the first tour days. The final day involved a 36-hole stroke-play event for amateurs and professionals. Prize money was only available to the professionals and totalled £65. There were 8 prizes ranging from £20 down to £3. Ben Sayers scored 74 in the first round and led by 4 strokes. He took 80 in the afternoon and was beaten by Willie Fernie whose rounds of 78 and 75 gave him victory by a stroke. Open Champion Harold Hilton, who had just won the Irish Amateur Open Championship, was the leading amateur, tying for 4th place. Sandy Herd and Harry Vardon had played an exhibition match the previous evening which Vardon had won by a single hole. The two disappointed in the tournament with Herd scoring 84 in the morning round and Vardon 82.

When the Irish Championship Meeting returned to Royal Portrush Golf Club in 1898 there was no tournament. An exhibition match was arranged between Sandy Herd and Harry Vardon on 3 September. Herd won 3&2. Later in 1898 the County Down Professional Tournament was played at County Down Golf Club.

The 1899 Irish Championship Meeting was held at Portmarnock Golf Club for the first time. The meeting was from 29 August to 2 September. The Irish Amateur Open Championship was on the first tour days. The professional tournament was over three days, from 31 August to 2 September. Total prize money was £105 with 10 prizes. The first day of the professional event consisted of 36-hole stroke-play with the leading 8 qualifying for the match-play stage. Harry Vardon led the qualifiers on 151. Vardon met J.H. Taylor met in the 36-hole final. The final was very one-sided. Vardon was 10 up after the morning round and eventually won 13&11.

There was no professional event at the 1900 Championships but it returned in 1901. The 1901 Irish Championship Meeting was held at the Royal Dublin Golf Club, Dollymount from 2 to 7 September. The first day was allocated to a series of amateur international matches with the Irish Amateur Open Championship was on the next four days. The professional tournament took place on 6 and 7 September. The entry consisted of 8 invited players with total prize money of £80. Sandy Herd and Harry Vardon met in the 36-hole final. Vardon led by 6 holes after the morning round. Herd putted well in the afternoon and had reduced the deficit to 2 holes at the turn. Vardon was still 2 up after 14 holes but Herd won the 15th and 16th to level the match. The 17th was halved but Vardon drove out of bounds at the final hole and Herd's four was enough to win the match. The final day also included a 36-hole event for Irish professionals. This was won by Henry Magee, the Greenore professional, who scored 174.

In May 1902 the London and North Western Railway sponsored the Greenore Professional Tournament at Greenore, where the company ran a hotel. In April 1903 the Lord Dudley, Lord Lieutenant of Ireland organised a series of mostly informal events in the Dublin area, with a number of the leading professionals invited. There were two 18-hole stroke-play events, at Royal Dublin Golf Club and Portmarnock Golf Club, both won by James Braid.

From 1903 the increasing number of entries meant that the 36-hole final of the Irish Amateur Open Championship was moved from Friday to Saturday and the professional events were discontinued.

== Winners ==
Year	Winner	Country	Venue	Score	Margin of victory	Runner-up	Winner's share (£)	Ref
1894	Andrew Kirkaldy	Scotland	Royal Dublin Golf Club	154	2 strokes	(Scotland) Hugh Kirkaldy	15	
1895	Sandy Herd	Scotland	Royal Portrush Golf Club	1 hole		(Jersey) Harry Vardon	30	
1896	Sandy Herd	Scotland	County Down Golf Club	4 & 3		(Scotland) Ben Sayers	40	
1897	Willie Fernie	Scotland	Royal Dublin Golf Club	153	1 stroke	(Scotland) Ben Sayers	20	
1898	No tournament							
1899	Harry Vardon	Jersey	Portmarnock Golf Club	13 & 11		(England) J.H. Taylor	30	
1900	No tournament							
1901	Sandy Herd	Scotland	Royal Dublin Golf Club	1 hole		(Jersey) Harry Vardon	35	
