= 1899 Open Championship =

Coordinates: 51.274°N 1.367°E

Tournament information
- Dates: 7–8 June 1899
- Location: Sandwich, England
- Course: Royal St George's Golf Club

Statistics
- Field: 98 players, 42 after cut
- Cut: 175
- Prize fund: £90
- Winner's share: £30

Champion
- (Jersey) Harry Vardon
- 310

Location in England

The 1899 Open Championship was the 39th Open Championship, held 7–8 June at Royal St George's Golf Club in Sandwich, England. Defending champion Harry Vardon won the Championship for the 3rd time, by five strokes from runner-up Jack White.

A meeting was held immediately before the tournament is response to a request from a majority of the professionals asking for an increase in prize money from £90 to £200, since the professionals felt "that the money offered as prizes was scarcely in keeping with the importance of the event". In response a small increase in prize money to £115 was announced to start in 1900.

All entries played 36 holes on the first day with all those within 19 strokes of the leader making the cut and playing 36 holes on the final day, with the additional provision that the final day's field had to contain at least 32 professionals.

There was some good scoring in the first round with a number of low scores. James Kinnell, Vardon and Tom Williamson led on 76 with a further nine players under 80. A stronger wind in the afternoon led to some higher scores but Vardon and J.H. Taylor both returned a score of 76 while James Braid scored 78. Vardon reached the turn in 33 and had a three at the 10th but then took 28 to cover the next five holes. He eventually came home in 43. Taylor was out in 36 and back in 40. After the first day, Vardon led on 152 with Taylor on 153 and Braid and Willie Park Jr. on 156. Many of the other players found conditions difficult and the cut was extended to 175 to include the requisite number of professionals.

Scoring was higher on the second morning with only the amateur Freddie Tait and Albert Tingey breaking 80. Vardon's 81 was good enough to extend his lead to three shots from Taylor and seven strokes from the rest of the field. In the afternoon, Vardon reached the turn in 34 and, with Taylor reaching the turn in 42, he had built up a large lead. Despite playing badly and taking 35 for the last seven holes, he won comfortably. White had the best round of the tournament with a final round 75 after matching Vardon's first nine of 34. Park faded with a final round of 89. Tait was the leading amateur in his last Open Championship before his death in February 1900.

== First day leaderboard ==
Wednesday, 7 June 1899

Place	Player	Score
1	(Jersey) Harry Vardon	76-76=152
2	(England) J.H. Taylor	77-76=153
T3	(Scotland) James Braid	78-78=156
T3	(Scotland) Willie Park Jr.	77-79=156
5	(Scotland) Jack White	79-79=158
6	(Scotland) Ben Sayers	81-78=159
T7	(Scotland) James Kinnell	76-84=160
T7	(Scotland) Andrew Kirkaldy	81-79=160
T7	(England) Tom Williamson	76-84=160
10	(Jersey) Thomas Renouf	79-82=161

== Final leaderboard ==
Thursday, 8 June 1899

Place	Player	Score	Money
1	(Jersey) Harry Vardon	76-76-81-77=310	£30
2	(Scotland) Jack White	79-79-82-75=315	£20
3	(Scotland) Andrew Kirkaldy	81-79-82-77=319	£15
4	(England) J.H. Taylor	77-76-83-84=320	£10
T5	(Scotland) James Braid	78-78-85-81=322	£7 10s
T5	(Scotland) Willie Fernie	79-83-82-78=322	£7 10s
T7	(Scotland) James Kinnell	76-84-80-84=324	0
T7	(Scotland) Freddie Tait (a)	81-82-79-82=324	−
T9	(England) Albert Tingey Sr.	81-81-79-85=326	0
T9	(England) Tom Williamson	76-84-80-86=326	0
