= 1896 Open Championship =

Coordinates: 56.043°N 2.823°W

Tournament information
- Dates: 10–11, 13 June 1896
- Location: Gullane, East Lothian, Scotland
- Course: Muirfield

Statistics
- Field: 63 players
- Cut: none
- Prize fund: £90
- Winner's share: £30

Champion
- (Jersey) Harry Vardon
- 316, playoff

Location in Scotland

The 1896 Open Championship was the 36th Open Championship, held 10–11 and 13 June at Muirfield in Gullane, East Lothian, Scotland. Harry Vardon won the Championship after a playoff against J.H. Taylor.

Sandy Herd led by five shots after a first round of 72. Taylor and James Kay were second after scoring 77. Taylor had reached turn in 35 but came back in a poor 42. The amateur Freddie Tait had the best round of the afternoon with a 75 while Herd had a disappointing 84 and Kay an even worse 88. At the end of the day, Taylor led on 155, with Herd on 156, Willie Fernie and David Brown on 157 and Tait on 158.

In the third round, the leading professionals had similar scores but the amateur Tait dropped down the field after an 84. Herd led on 235 with Taylor on 236, Brown and Ben Sayers on 238 and Fernie and Vardon on 239. Taylor the first starter of those in contention and played steadily for an 80 and a total of 316. Fernie started well but took seven at the 7th and also finished with an 80 and a total of 319. Vardon played the best golf of the leading six and came to the last needing a four to win. However he played safely to avoid the bunkers around the green and settled for a five to finish with a 77 and a tie with Taylor. Herd, who had led Vardon by 11 shots after the first round, had another bad afternoon round of 85 after his 84 the previous day.

In the 36-hole playoff, Taylor started badly and was six strokes behind after eight holes, taking 40 to Vardon's 34. However he gained a shot on five of the next six holes and, although he took six at the 16th, ended the morning golf only two strokes behind. The scores were level after the 1st hole in the afternoon when Vardon took 5 while Taylor scored 3. However, Vardon gained shots at the next three holes. After gaining a stroke at the 12th Taylor was only two behind. They then halved the next five holes, both taking six at the long 16th. The championship was decided at the 17th where Vardon holed a 12-yard putt to take a three shot lead to the last. Playing boldly Taylor got into a difficult position in a greenside bunker and took six, while Vardon played safely for a five to win by four shots.

Just five days before his 73rd birthday, Old Tom Morris played in his last Open Championship, 36 years after finishing second in the first Championship. At 72 years, 360 days he remains the oldest known competitor in the Open Championship.

== First day leaderboard ==
Wednesday, 10 June 1896

| Place | Player | Score |
|---|---|---|
| 1 | (England) J.H. Taylor | 77-78=155 |
| 2 | (Scotland) Sandy Herd | 72-84=156 |
| T3 | (Scotland) David Brown | 80-77=157 |
| T3 | (Scotland) Willie Fernie | 78-79=157 |
| 5 | (Scotland) Freddie Tait (a) | 83-75=158 |
| T6 | (Scotland) Willie Park Jr. | 79-80=159 |
| T6 | (Scotland) Ben Sayers | 83-76=159 |
| 8 | (Jersey) Harry Vardon | 83-78=161 |
| T9 | (Scotland) James Braid | 83-81=164 |
| T9 | (Scotland) John Hunter | 85-79=164 |
| T9 | (Scotland) Peter McEwan Jr. | 83-81=164 |
| T9 | (Scotland) Archie Simpson | 85-79=164 |

== Final leaderboard ==
Thursday, 11 June 1896

| Place | Player | Score | Money |
|---|---|---|---|
| T1 | (England) J.H. Taylor | 77-78-81-80=316 | Playoff |
| T1 | (Jersey) Harry Vardon | 83-78-78-77=316 | Playoff |
| T3 | (Scotland) Willie Fernie | 78-79-82-80=319 | £10 |
| T3 | (Scotland) Freddie Tait (a) | 83-75-84-77=319 | − |
| 5 | (Scotland) Sandy Herd | 72-84-79-85=320 | £7 |
| 6 | (Scotland) James Braid | 83-81-79-80=323 | £5 |
| T7 | (Scotland) David Brown | 80-77-81-86=324 | £3 6s 8d |
| T7 | (Scotland) Ben Sayers | 83-76-79-86=324 | £3 6s 8d |
| T7 | (Scotland) Andrew Scott | 83-84-77-80=324 | £3 6s 8d |
| 10 | (Jersey) Tom Vardon | 83-82-77-83=325 | £3 |

=== Playoff ===
Taylor and Vardon were engaged in a 36-hole tournament at North Berwick on Friday 12 June and so the playoff was delayed until the following day. Taylor finished joint winner of the North Berwick tournament, with Ben Sayers and Willie Fernie, winning £8. "After the championship there seemed to a complete collapse of interest in the game, both in the players and spectators."

Saturday, 13 June 1896

| Place | Player | Score | Money |
|---|---|---|---|
| 1 | (Jersey) Harry Vardon | 78-79=157 | £30 |
| 2 | (England) J.H. Taylor | 80-81=161 | £20 |

=== Scorecards ===
Morning round

| Hole | 1 | 2 | 3 | 4 | 5 | 6 | 7 | 8 | 9 | Out | 10 | 11 | 12 | 13 | 14 | 15 | 16 | 17 | 18 | Back | Total |
|---|---|---|---|---|---|---|---|---|---|---|---|---|---|---|---|---|---|---|---|---|---|
| (Jersey) Vardon | 3 | 5 | 3 | 5 | 5 | 5 | 4 | 4 | 4 | 38 | 4 | 5 | 5 | 4 | 4 | 4 | 5 | 4 | 5 | 40 | 78 |
| (England) Taylor | 4 | 5 | 4 | 6 | 5 | 6 | 5 | 5 | 3 | 43 | 3 | 4 | 5 | 4 | 3 | 3 | 6 | 4 | 5 | 37 | 80 |

Afternoon round

| Hole | 1 | 2 | 3 | 4 | 5 | 6 | 7 | 8 | 9 | Out | 10 | 11 | 12 | 13 | 14 | 15 | 16 | 17 | 18 | Back | Total |
|---|---|---|---|---|---|---|---|---|---|---|---|---|---|---|---|---|---|---|---|---|---|
| (Jersey) Vardon | 5 | 4 | 4 | 4 | 6 | 4 | 4 | 4 | 5 | 40 | 4 | 5 | 5 | 4 | 3 | 4 | 6 | 3 | 5 | 39 | 79 |
| (England) Taylor | 3 | 5 | 5 | 5 | 5 | 5 | 4 | 4 | 5 | 41 | 4 | 5 | 4 | 4 | 3 | 4 | 6 | 4 | 6 | 40 | 81 |
