= Grand Duke Michael's Tournament =

Tournament information
- Location: Cannes, France
- Established: 1907
- Course(s): Cannes Golf Club
- Month played: February
- Final year: 1907

Final champion
- Arnaud Massy

Location in France

Grand Duke Michael's Tournament was a professional invitational golf tournament played at Cannes Golf Club in Cannes, France, and promoted by the Grand Duke Michael Mikhailovich of Russia. The event was held just once, on 26 February 1907. The tournament was contested by 12 invited players. The main event was a stroke-play contest over 36 holes, won by Arnaud Massy, a stroke ahead of Ted Ray.

== History ==
In October 1906 it was announced that Grand Duke Michael was organising a professional tournament at Cannes. By January 1907 the arrangements were complete and a field of 10 was announced with the meeting to take place from 25 to 27 February.

Eventually 12 players were invited to play in the event. These were: James Braid, Bernard Callaway, Christopher Callaway, Sandy Herd, Rowland Jones, Arnaud Massy, Ted Ray, Ben Sayers, J.H. Taylor, Harry Vardon, Tom Vardon and Jack White. The field thus contained all the leading players, including all recent winners and runners-up in the Open Championship. Massy, the only Frenchman, had performed well in recent Opens and had won the inaugural French Open in 1906. The Callaway brothers, late additions to the field, were less well known and were professionals in Switzerland, Bernard at Maloja and Christopher at St Moritz.

The main event was played on 26 February and was a 36-stroke play tournament. J.H. Taylor led after the first round with a 72 with Arnaud Massy and Ted Ray on 75. Massy had taken 6 at the last to spoil a good round. In the afternoon Taylor reached the turn in 37 and was then two ahead of Ray and four ahead of Massy. Taylor, however, had a poor last 9, taking 43 and Massy, coming home in 36, beat Ray by a stroke. Rowland Jones had the best afternoon round, scoring 72. The first prize was £50 given by The Cannes club together with £12 and a golf club given by the town of Cannes. Second prize amounted to £33 with £15 for third.

The following day, 27 February, there was a four-ball competition. This was won by Rowland Jones and Arnaud Massy who scored 137, including a first round of 66. Ben Sayers and Tom Vardon were second, 4 strokes behind. There was a prize of £15 for the winners, with £10 for second place and £5 for third.

== Hyères ==
After the Cannes tournament most of the professionals travelled to Hyères to play a day's golf there on 1 March. The Callaway brothers, Arnaud Massy and Ben Sayers did not play. The other 8 played four-ball matches in the morning. They were joined by local professional William Freemantle for an 18-hole stroke play contest in the afternoon. This resulted is a tie between Sandy Herd and Ted Ray who both scored 71. Ray seemed the likely winner until he took 5 at the short 17th, while Herd scored 2 there. Ray and Herd shared the first prize of 300 francs (£12) and second prize of 200 francs (£8).

== Rowland Jones ==
Rowland Jones had played in the London Professional Foursomes Tournament partnered by Alfred Toogood. They had won their semi-final on 14 February but the final was arranged for 27 February, when Jones was in Cannes. It was suggested that the final be postponed but it was argued that Jones should not have entered unless he was available and so their opponents, Ralph Smith and Albert Tingey, Sr., claimed the final.

== Winners ==
| Year | Winners | Country | Venue | Score | Margin of victory | Runner-up | Winner's share (£) | Ref |
|---|---|---|---|---|---|---|---|---|
| 1907 | Arnaud Massy | France | Cannes Golf Club | 149 | 1 stroke | (Jersey) Ted Ray | 62 | |
