= Nice International Tournament =

Golf tournament in Nice, France

Tournament information
- Location: Cagnes-sur-Mer, France
- Established: 1907
- Course(s): Nice Golf Club
- Month played: March
- Final year: 1908

Final champion
- Harry Vardon

Location in France

The Nice International Tournament was a professional invitational golf tournament played at Nice Golf Club in Cagnes-sur-Mer, 10 km west of Nice, France. The event was held just once, on 17 March 1908. The tournament was contested by 8 invited players. The main event was a stroke-play contest over 36 holes, won by Harry Vardon, four strokes ahead of Arnaud Massy.

== History ==
An invitation tournament promoted by Grand Duke Michael Mikhailovich of Russia had been held in Cannes in February 1907. Following the success of this tournament, similar events were held in March 1908. Competitions were held at Nice Golf Club in Cagnes-sur-Mer on 17 and 18 February. These were followed by further events in Hyères on 20 and 21 February.

The Nice International Tournament was played on 17 March and was a 36-stroke play tournament. 8 players were invited to play in the event. These consisted of the Great Triumvirate, James Braid, J.H. Taylor and Harry Vardon, three French golfers, Baptiste Bomboudiac, Jean Gassiat and Arnaud Massy, together with local professionals Bernard Callaway and Alfred Covington. The first prize was 1000 francs (£40) with a second prize of 500 francs (£20) and third prize of 250 francs (£10). There was a prize of 125 francs (£5) for the best single round.

Vardon led after the first round with a 72, a stroke ahead of Braid and Massy. Vardon and Gassiat scored 71 in the afternoon. Vardon's total of 143 was 4 ahead of Massy and a further stroke ahead of Braid and Gassiat who tied for third place.

The next morning, 18 February, there was an 18-hole fourball stroke-play competition. This resulted in a tie between the Braid/Gassiat and Callaway/Massy pairings who both scored 68. Covington and Vardon came third, a stroke behind with Bomboudiac and Taylor scoring 71.

The afternoon was taken up with a contest between the three French professionals and the Great Triumvirate. All three matches were won by the British players. Braid beat Massy 4&2, Taylor beat Gassiat 4&2 while Vardon beat Bomboudiac 4&3.

== Winners ==
Year	Winners	Country	Venue	Score	Margin of victory	Runner-up	Winner's share (£)	Ref
1908	Harry Vardon	Jersey	Nice Golf Club	143	4 strokes	(France) Arnaud Massy	40	
