= Albert Tingey Sr. =

English golfer (1869–1953)

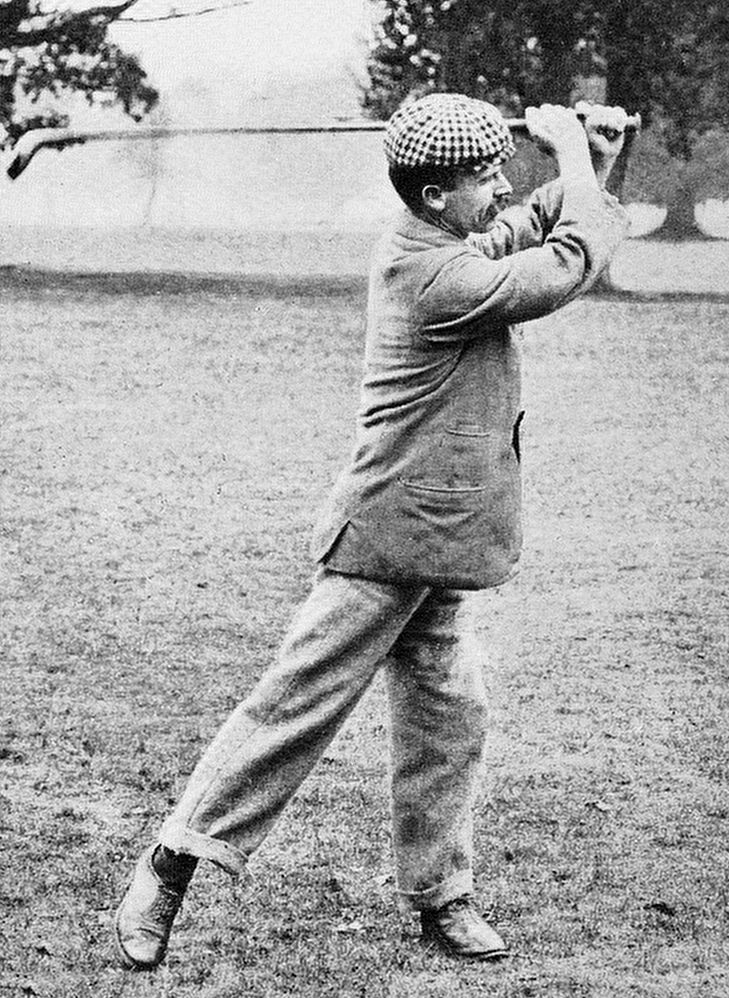
- Tingey, c. 1900

Personal information
- Full name: Albert Tingey Sr.
- Nationality: England
- Born: 1869 Newmarket, Cambridgeshire, England
- Died: February 1953 (aged 83–84) England

Career
- Sport: Golf
- Status: Professional

Best results in major championships
- Masters Tournament: DNP
- PGA Championship: DNP
- U.S. Open: DNP
- The Open Championship: T9: 1899

Albert Tingey Sr. (1869 – February 1953) was an English professional golfer. Tingey finished tied for ninth in the 1899 Open Championship. He was a club maker, specializing in the production of putters. He served in World War I in a pals battalion and was one of the founding members of the British PGA.

== Early life ==
Tingey was born in Newmarket, Cambridgeshire, England, in 1869. He apprenticed as a club maker and made his specialty the production of putters. He was posted at Royal West Norfolk in Francaster from 1892 until 1899 then moved on to West Hertfordshire where he was professional until 1921. He founded the Paris Golf School at Fontainebleau but when World War I erupted he crossed the Channel and returned to England, joining the British army. After the war was over he took a job at Frinton-on-Sea.

== Golf career ==
=== 1899 Open Championship ===
Tingey played consistent golf, scoring rounds of 81-81-79-85=326 and tied for ninth place. He failed to win any prize money since only the top-5 were paid. The 1899 Open Championship was the 39th Open Championship, held 7–8 June at Royal St George's Golf Club in Sandwich, England. Defending champion Harry Vardon won the Championship for the third time, by five strokes from runner-up Jack White.

=== Match vs. Peter Paxton ===
Tingey met Peter Paxton in a memorable match on 27 October 1900 on a windy and wet day at Tooting Bec Golf Club in south London. Paxton, playing on his home course, was likely the betting favorite, although his results going in were not equal with Tingey who in October 1899 had halved against the venerable Harry Vardon at Watford and had been playing better golf in the short term. Heavy rain the day before had soaked the course making approach shots and putting difficult. Playing in stiff winds, the first 27 holes were stubbornly contested to a draw, but Tingey pulled away in the end winning 4 and 3.

=== London Professional Foursomes Tournament ===
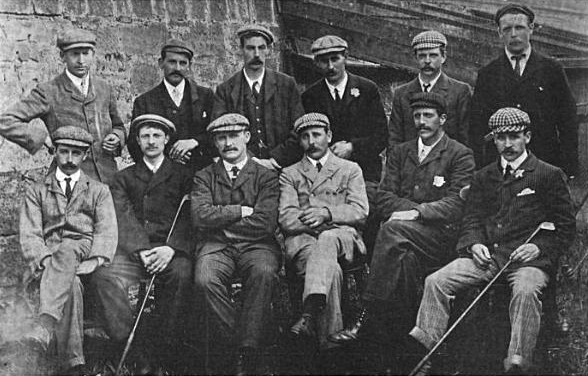
A group photo of the 1903 English golf team prior to their international match against Scotland. Tingey (far right, front row) holds a spoon in hand.

The final of the 1907 London Professional Foursomes Tournament was between Rowland Jones/Alfred Toogood and Ralph Smith/Albert Tingey Sr., and was arranged for 27 February. Jones, however, had a conflicting tournament schedule that had him instead playing in the Grand Duke Michael's Tournament in Cannes on 26 and 27 February. It was suggested that the final be postponed but it was argued that Jones should not have entered unless he was available and so Smith and Tingey won the final in a walk-over. A fill-in match involving Smith and Tingey was arranged. The chief prizes were a pair of shields to be held for one year and gold medals presented by Mr. F. A. Johnson.

Year	Winners	Country	Venue	Margin of victory	Runners-up	Winner's share (£)	Ref
London Professional Foursomes Tournament
1907	Ralph Smith & Albert Tingey Sr.	England; England	Bramshot Golf Club	Walk-over	(England) Rowland Jones & (England) Alfred Toogood		

== World War I ==
Like so many other British citizens and sporting figures, Tingey heeded his country's call during World War I. He joined a pals battalion called the "Niblick Brigade". Other British golf stars such as Charles Mayo and James Bradbeer also signed up with pals battalions to confront the Axis powers in the Great War.

Near the end of their basic training Tingey's group, called "Company B", was invited to the home of Lady Astor at Cliveden Grange. The golfers were impressed with the closely mown yard that was "suitable for an 18th green". When Lady Astor, a non-drinker, offered refreshments to the soldiers their spirits perked up at the possibility of an alcoholic beverage. They soon became "quietly ungrateful" when she trotted out of the kitchen with two Woodbine cigarettes and a glass of lemonade for each.

== Family ==
Tingey had a son, Albert Tingey Jr., who was also a professional golfer.

== Death and legacy ==
Tingey died in February 1953. He was one of the founding members of the British PGA.

== Team appearances ==
- England–Scotland Professional Match (representing England): 1903, 1905 (tie)
