= Port Seton Professional Tournament =

Professional golf tournament

Tournament information
- Location: Port Seton, East Lothian, Scotland
- Established: 1914
- Course(s): Port Seton Golf Club
- Month played: June
- Final year: 1914

Final champion
- George Duncan

Location in Scotland

The Port Seton Professional Tournament was a professional golf tournament played at Port Seton on 1 June 1914 to promote the new golf course. George Duncan won the event by two shots from J.H. Taylor.

== Detail ==
The construction of the Port Seton Golf Club course was largely funded by the Musselburgh and District Electric Light and Traction Company, with their terminus next to the course. It had opened in 1912, using 100 acres of land leased from Francis Charteris, 10th Earl of Wemyss.

The tournament was played on a Monday, between the Scottish Professional Championship which had finished on the previous Friday and three days before the start of the Cruden Bay Professional Tournament. It attracted most of the leading Scottish-based players and some, although not all, of the English-based professionals playing at Cruden Bay. The tournament consisted of 36 holes of stroke-play with £54 of prize money provided by the club. The main prizes were £20 for the winner and £10 for the runner-up.

George Duncan and J.H. Taylor led after the first round with scores of 74, ahead of Allan Gow on 76. In the afternoon Duncan took 78 to win the tournament, ahead of Taylor, who took 78. Gow had a poor afternoon and Willie Watt finished as the leading Scottish-based golfer, finishing third on 155 with his brother Davie fourth on 156.

== Winners ==
Year	Winners	Country	Score	Margin of victory	Runner-up	Winner's share (£)	Ref
1914	George Duncan	Scotland	152	2 strokes	(England) J.H. Taylor	20	
