= Cruden Bay Professional Tournament =

Tournament information
- Location: Cruden Bay, Aberdeenshire, Scotland
- Established: 1899
- Course(s): Cruden Bay Golf Club
- Final year: 1914

Final champion
- Harry Vardon

Location in Scotland

The Cruden Bay Professional Tournament was a professional golf tournament played irregularly at Cruden Bay from 1899 to 1914.

In the 1890s the Great North of Scotland Railway built the Cruden Bay Hotel and golf course, together with the associated transport links (the Boddam Branch and Cruden Bay Hotel Tramway). The hotel and golf course opened in early 1899 and a professional golf tournament was arranged by the railway company to promote the new hotel and golf course. The company organised three further tournaments, in 1909, 1911 and 1914.

The tournaments consisted of a 36-hole stroke-play qualifying day followed by a knock-out match-play stage. On all four occasions that the tournament was held, the winner of qualifying part went on to win the tournament. All four finals involved a Scottish player but they lost each time.

== History ==
=== 1899 ===
The tournament was played on two days, 14 and 15 April. The first day consisted of 36 holes of stroke play with the leading 4 players moving to the knock-out phase on the second day. The winner won £30, the losing finalist £20, with the losing semi-finalist each getting £12. Those placed from 5th to 12th in the qualifying received cash prizes from £7 down to £3. There were two further £5 prizes for the best rounds in each of the qualifying rounds. 22 players competed in the tournament. These were mostly Scottish professionals although Harry Vardon made the trip north. J.H. Taylor was unable to play. Vardon led the 36-hole qualifying day with rounds of 79 and 83 and went on to beat James Kinnell in the final.

=== 1909 ===
The tournament was extended to three days, played from 6 to 8 May. The first day consisted of 36 holes of stroke play with the leading 16 moving to the knock-out phase. There were two rounds of 18-hole match-play on the second day and two more on the final day. The winner won £40, the losing finalist £20, with the losing semi-finalist each getting £12, quarter-finalists £8, other qualifiers £3 and there were again two further prizes for the best rounds in each of the qualifying rounds. The course measured 6,056 yards. J.H. Taylor led the 36-hole qualifying day with rounds of 72 and 73. Three players on 159 had to play off for the last two places. Taylor beat James Braid in the final.

=== 1911 ===
The tournament was played from 8 to 10 June. The format and prize money were the same as in 1909 with a first prize of £40 out of total prize money of £150. An exceptionally strong field of 44 players competed. As well as James Braid, J.H. Taylor and Harry Vardon, the field included ex-Open champions Arnaud Massy, Sandy Herd and Jack White, future Open champions George Duncan and Ted Ray and most of the leading England-based professionals. The course measured 6,077 yards. Ted Ray led the qualifying with rounds of 74 and 73, the 73 being a new course record for the extended course. There were two £5 prizes for the best rounds of the day. Ray's 74 had won him the morning prize and, although he also had the best round in the afternoon, he was excluded from winning both prizes, the £5 being shared by Herd and Massy who both scored 76.

Ray met James Braid in the final. Ray had played excellent golf in all his matches while Braid had beaten both Taylor and Vardon. Braid took an early 2-hole lead but Ray had levelled by the turn and threes at the 15th and 16th put him dormie-2. Ray took 5 at the 17th and, although neither played well on the 18th, Braid holed a 12-yard putt to halve the match. It was decided that the players should play another 9 holes. Braid had a short putt at the 8th to win the match but missed. At the short 9th both played good tee shots. Ray holed his putt for a 2 but Braid missed his, so that the match was again level. The match now became a sudden-death playoff, starting at the 17th. Braid hit his second shot out-of-bounds and took four to reach the green, so that Ray's 5 was enough to win the match.

The event clashed with the Scottish Professional Championship which was held at Turnberry on 8 and 9 June, which meant that many of the leading Scottish-based professionals did not compete at Cruden Bay.

=== 1914 ===
The tournament was played from 4 to 6 June. A number of the players had competed in the Port Seton Professional Tournament earlier in the week. The format and prize money were again the same. The course had been lengthened since 1911, now measuring 6,179 yards. Harry Vardon led the qualifying with rounds of 73 and 73. Vardon beat George Duncan in the final.

== Winners ==
Year	Winners	Country	Margin of victory	Runners-up	Winner's share (£)	Ref
1899	Harry Vardon	Jersey	3 & 2	(Scotland) James Kinnell	30	
1909	J.H. Taylor	England	1 up	(Scotland) James Braid	40	
1911	Ted Ray	Jersey	28 holes	(Scotland) James Braid	40	
1914	Harry Vardon	Jersey	3 & 2	(Scotland) George Duncan	40	

In 1911 Ray and Braid were tied after 18 holes and then tied again after a further 9 holes. There was then a sudden-death playoff, play moving to the 17th hole which Ray won.
