= Musselburgh and District Electric Light and Traction Company =

Passenger tramway service in Scotland

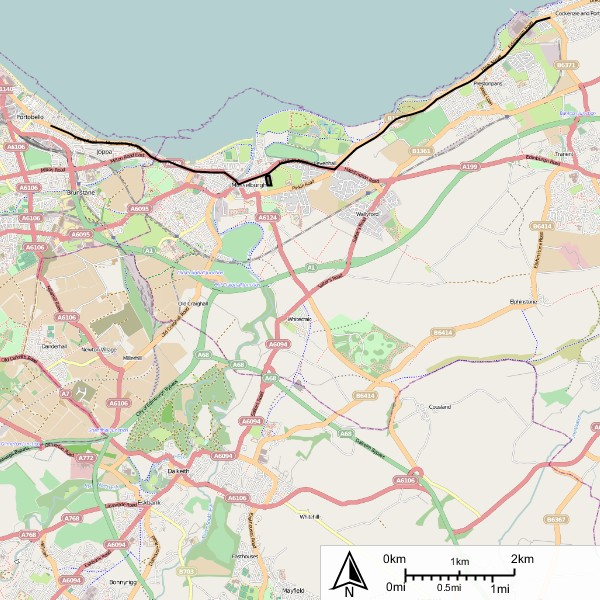
- Map of the route of the Musselburgh and District Electric Light and Traction Company

Operation
- Locale: Musselburgh
- Open: 12 December 1904
- Close: 25 February 1928
- Status: Closed

Infrastructure
- Track gauge: 1,435 mm (4 ft 8 1/2 in)
- Propulsion system: Electric

Statistics
- Route length: 6.53 miles (10.51 km)

Musselburgh and District Electric Light and Traction Company operated a passenger tramway service in Musselburgh between 1904 and 1928.

== History ==
The National Electric Construction Company built a 3-mile tramway in Musselburgh from the terminus of the Edinburgh cable-hauled tramway at Joppa, to Levenhall. This opened for service on 12 December 1904. In August 1905 the NEC set up the Musselburgh and District Electric Light and Traction Company to operate the line, and the system was expanded with an extension to Tranent Road in Cockenzie opening on 5 August 1909, and on 31 December 1909 to Port Seton bringing the total single line route to 6.55 miles.

Due to narrow streets, the line was mostly single track, with passing loops at various places.

Construction of the Port Seton Golf Club course was largely funded by the company, as their terminus was midway along the proposed course. It opened in 1912, utilising 100 acres of land leased from Francis Charteris, 10th Earl of Wemyss. The club sponsored the Port Seton Professional Tournament in June 1914 to promote the course.

== Closure ==
The line closed on 25 February 1928. Edinburgh Corporation Tramways assumed responsibility for through services as far as Levenhall. The remaining section was replaced by motor buses.

== Remnants ==
Near Morrison's Haven, a section of one double-track loop about 58m in length and laid in setts survives, and was uncovered at some point for educational purposes. It is thought other sections still survive beneath the tarmacced roads.
