= Peter McEwan Sr. =

Scottish golfer and club maker

Personal information
- Nationality: Scotland
- Born: 3 January 1834 Edinburgh, Scotland
- Died: 10 September 1895 (aged 61) Portrush, Ireland

Career
- Sport: Golf
- Status: Professional

Best results in major championships
- The Open Championship: 6th: 1861

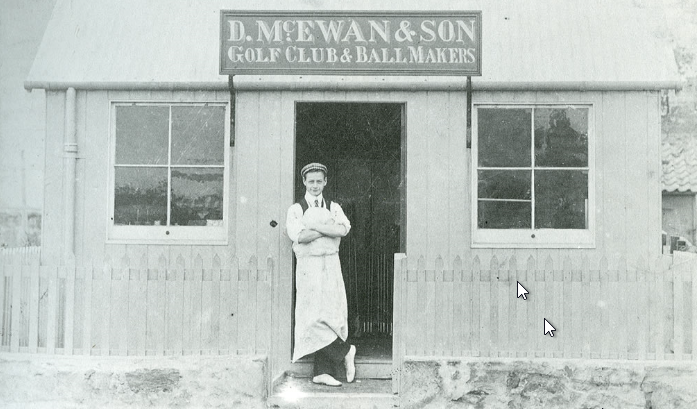
An unidentified assistant standing in front of the McEwan golf shop in Bruntsfield, Edinburgh, Scotland, c. 1870.

Peter McEwan Sr. (3 January 1834 – 10 September 1895) was a Scottish professional golfer and club maker. McEwan placed sixth in the 1861 Open Championship.

== Early life ==
McEwan was born in Scotland in 1834 to a family known for their club-making business in Bruntsfield from as early as 1770. He was the son of Douglas McEwan (1809-1886) and the grandson of Peter McEwan (1781-1836).

== Golf career ==
=== 1861 Open Championship ===
The 1861 Open Championship was a golf competition held at Prestwick Golf Club, Ayrshire, Scotland. It was the second Open Championship and the first to open to amateurs as well as professionals. Ten professionals and eight amateurs contested the event, with Tom Morris Sr. winning the championship by 4 shots from Willie Park Sr. McEwan played consistently well, shooting rounds of 56-60-62=178, and finished in sixth place.

== Death ==
In September 1895, McEwan travelled from England for a professional tournament at Royal Portrush Golf Club with his son David. He arrived on 10 September but collapsed as he was getting out of his carriage at the club house and died. David and his brothers Douglas and Peter withdrew from the tournament. An inquest determined that he had died from natural causes. His body was taken to Musselburgh, Scotland, for burial.
