= List of golfers with most wins in one PGA Tour event =

The following are the golfers who have won a PGA Tour event at least five times.

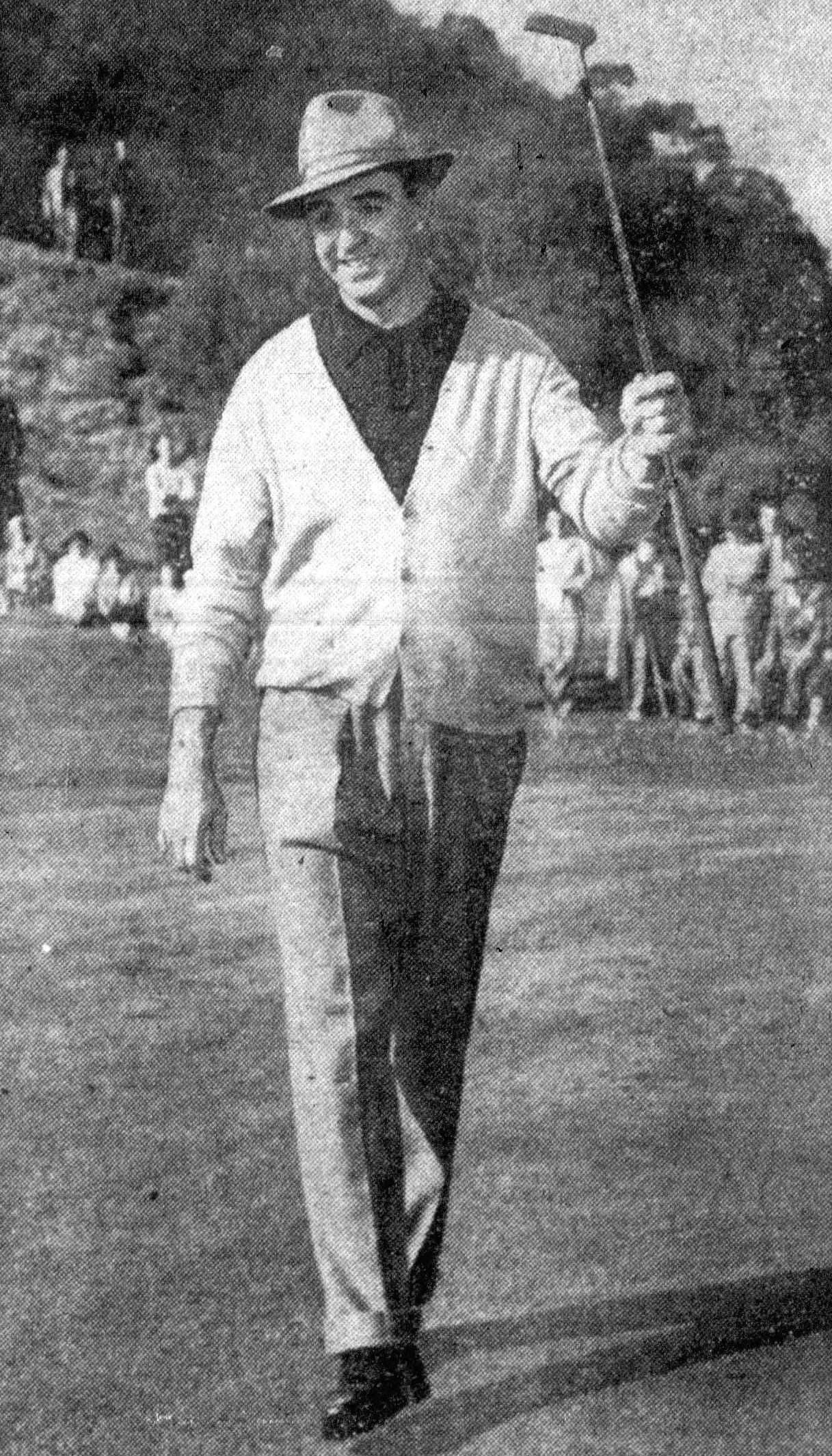
Sam Snead (pictured in 1951) was the first golfer to win a single PGA Tour event eight times, a feat only matched by Tiger Woods

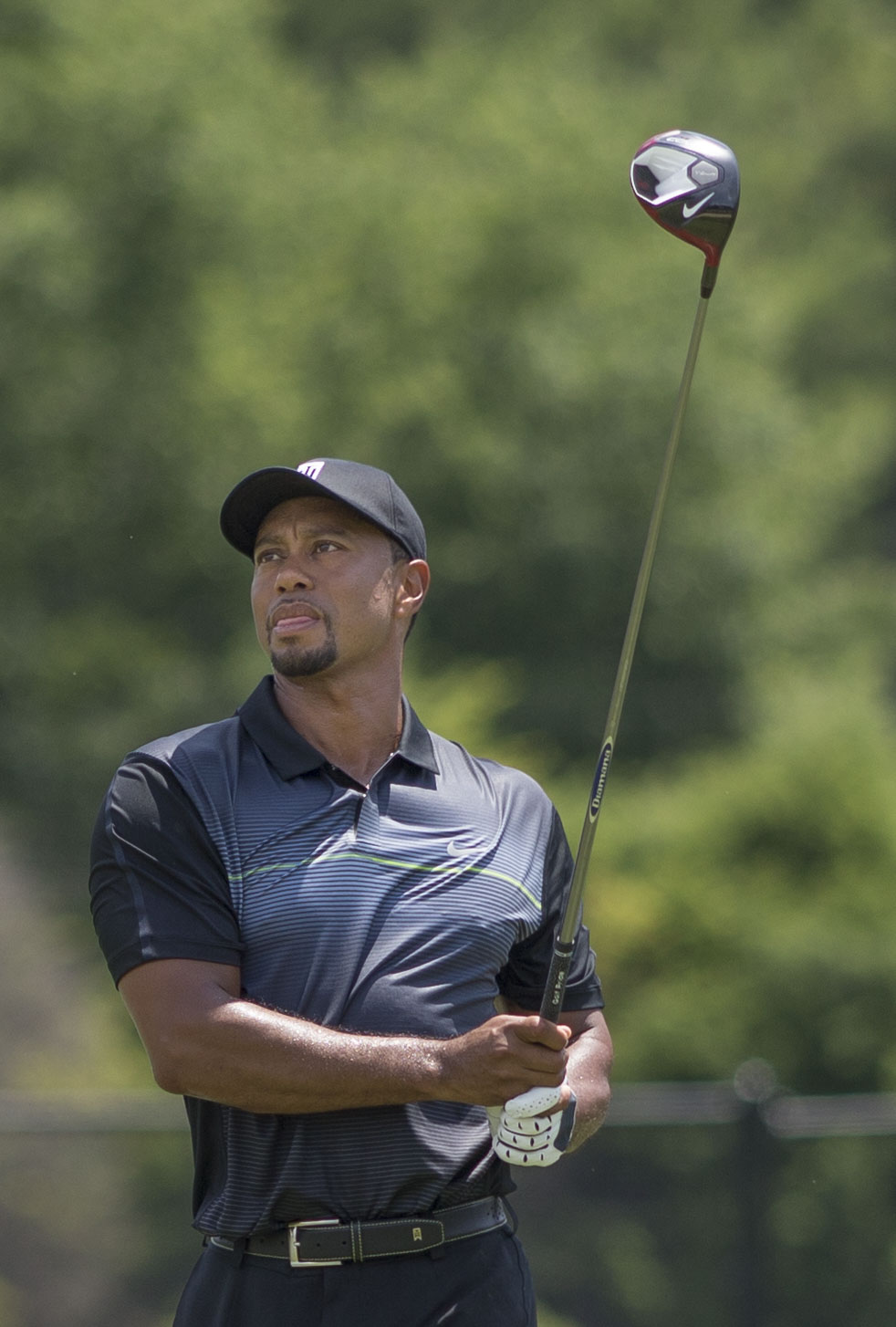
Tiger Woods (pictured in 2014) has won a record seven different PGA Tour events at least five times each

Key
Denotes major championship ★

Player	Tournament	Years
8 wins
Sam Snead	Greater Greensboro Open	1938, 1946, 1949, 1950, 1955, 1956, 1960, 1965
Tiger Woods	Arnold Palmer Invitational	2000, 2001, 2002, 2003, 2008, 2009, 2012, 2013
Tiger Woods	WGC-Bridgestone Invitational	1999, 2000, 2001, 2005, 2006, 2007, 2009, 2013
7 wins
Tiger Woods	Farmers Insurance Open	1999, 2003, 2005, 2006, 2007, 2008, 2013
Tiger Woods	WGC-Cadillac Championship	1999, 2002, 2003, 2005, 2006, 2007, 2013
6 wins
Harry Vardon	The Open Championship ★	1896, 1898, 1899, 1903, 1911, 1914
Alec Ross	North and South Open	1902, 1904, 1907, 1908, 1910, 1914
Sam Snead	Miami Open	1937, 1939, 1946, 1950, 1951, 1955
Jack Nicklaus	Masters Tournament ★	1963, 1965, 1966, 1972, 1975, 1986
5 wins
J.H. Taylor	The Open Championship ★	1894, 1895, 1900, 1909, 1913
James Braid	The Open Championship ★	1901, 1905, 1906, 1908, 1910
Walter Hagen	Western Open	1916, 1921, 1926, 1927, 1932
Walter Hagen	PGA Championship ★	1921, 1924, 1925, 1926, 1927
Sam Snead	Goodall Palm Beach Round Robin	1938, 1952, 1954, 1955, 1957
Ben Hogan	Colonial National Invitation	1946, 1947, 1952, 1953, 1959
Peter Thomson	The Open Championship ★	1954, 1955, 1956, 1958, 1965
Arnold Palmer	Bob Hope Chrysler Classic	1960, 1962, 1968, 1971, 1973
Jack Nicklaus	Tournament of Champions	1963, 1964, 1971, 1973, 1977
Jack Nicklaus	PGA Championship ★	1963, 1971, 1973, 1975, 1980
Tom Watson	The Open Championship ★	1975, 1977, 1980, 1982, 1983
Mark O'Meara	AT&T Pebble Beach National Pro-Am	1985, 1989, 1990, 1992, 1997
Davis Love III	Verizon Heritage	1987, 1991, 1992, 1998, 2003
Tiger Woods	BMW Championship	1997, 1999, 2003, 2007, 2009
Tiger Woods	Memorial Tournament	1999, 2000, 2001, 2009, 2012
Tiger Woods	Masters Tournament ★	1997, 2001, 2002, 2005, 2019
Phil Mickelson	AT&T Pebble Beach Pro-Am	1998, 2005, 2007, 2012, 2019

Source: Official website
Notability:

== Multiple winners ==
The following golfers have won more than one event at least five times.

7 events

- Tiger Woods (WGC-Bridgestone Invitational, WGC-Cadillac Championship, Farmers Insurance Open, Arnold Palmer Invitational, BMW Championship, Memorial Tournament, Masters Tournament)

3 events

- Sam Snead (Greater Greensboro Open, Miami Open, Goodall Palm Beach Round Robin)
- Jack Nicklaus (Masters Tournament, Tournament of Champions, PGA Championship)

2 events

- Walter Hagen (Western Open, PGA Championship)
