= Greenore Professional Tournament =

Tournament information
- Location: Greenore, County Louth, Ireland
- Established: 1902
- Course(s): Greenore Golf Club
- Month played: May
- Final year: 1902

Final champion
- James Braid

Location in Ireland

The Greenore Professional Tournament was a golf tournament played in Greenore, County Louth, Ireland. The event was held just once, in 1902, and had total prize money of £70, provided by the London and North Western Railway. The railway company ran a ferry service between Greenore and Holyhead, and had built a hotel in Greenore together with the golf course.

The tournament took place from 20 to 22 May. The first day consisted of 36 holes of stroke-play. The leading 8 qualified to play in the match-play on the following two days. Harry Vardon led the qualifying with rounds of 71 and 70, 5 shots ahead of James Braid. Vardon and Braid met in the first semi-final, with Braid winning 3 & 2. The tournament was won by Braid who beat Sandy Herd 4 & 3 in the 36-hole final.

== Winners ==
| Year | Winner | Country | Venue | Margin of victory | Runner-up | Winner's share (£) | Ref |
|---|---|---|---|---|---|---|---|
| 1902 | James Braid | Scotland | Greenore Golf Club | 4&3 | (Scotland) Sandy Herd | 30 | |
