= Erskine Golf Club =

Golf club in Erskine, Renfrewshire, Scotland

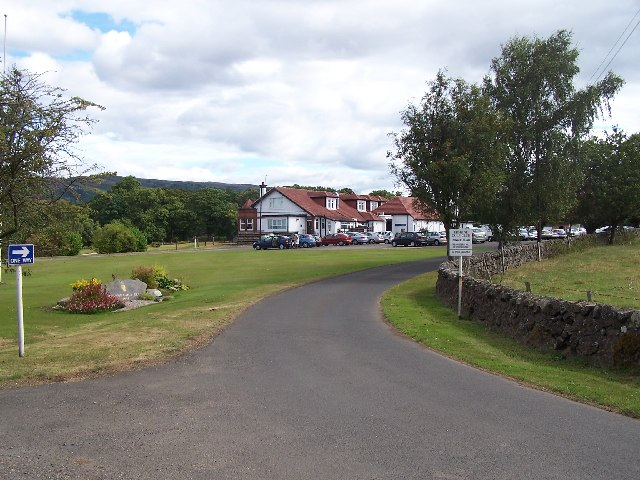
- Clubhouse
- Interactive map of Erskine Golf Club
- 55°54′59″N 4°30′15″W

Club information
- Location: Erskine
- Established: 1904
- Type: Private
- Tota holes: 18
- Tournaments: Scottish Pro Championship in 1991 Scottish Youth Championship in 2007
- Greens: Bentgrass
- Website: http://www.erskinegolfclublimited.co.uk/
- Designed by: Willie Fernie, James Braid, Dr Alister MacKenzie, Leslie Balfour-Melville, Robert Maxwell, Norman Mitchell Innes
- Par: 71
- Length: 6372 yards

Erskine Golf Club is on the banks of the River Clyde at Erskine, Renfrewshire. It sits on the border between Erskine and Bishopton. The club takes its name from the former Erskine Estate.

== History ==
The course was founded by the land owner of the Erskine Estate, William Arthur Baird. He wanted to construct a course on his land and enrolled the help of three friends. Leslie Balfour-Melville, Robert Maxwell and Norman Mitchell Innes helped layout the course at Erskine in 1901. Baird then encouraged Willie Fernie (open champion 1883) to develop the course into 18 holes between 1903 and 1904.

The course opened on Saturday 12 March 1904. An exhibition match was played between Willie Fernie and Ben Sayers. Later in the year a meeting was held in Bishopton Primary School and the club was established. Baird became the first captain and in 1905 built the clubhouse, furnished it and maintained at his own expense.

The club managed to carry on through World War I and in 1920 enlisted the help of Dr Alister MacKenzie to redesign the 12th and 13th holes. In homage these holes are named after their designer.

James Braid (five times open champion) redesigned the course in 1937. He added new bunkers and holes and improvements to the design of the greens. This is the course as it is today.

== See also ==
- Golf in Scotland
- History of golf
