= County Down Professional Tournament =

1898 Irish golf tournament

Tournament information
- Location: Newcastle, County Down, Ireland
- Established: 1898
- Course(s): County Down Golf Club
- Month played: September/October
- Final year: 1898

Final champion
- Harry Vardon

Location in Ireland

The County Down Professional Tournament was a golf tournament played in Newcastle, County Down, Ireland. The event was held just once, in 1898, and had total prize money of £105.

The tournament took place from 29 September to 1 October. The first day consisted of 36 holes of stroke-play. The leading 8 qualified to play in the match-play on the following two days. The weather was wet and windy on the first day and J.H. Taylor led the qualifying with rounds of 78 and 86, 2 strokes ahead of Sandy Herd. Taylor's round of 78 earned him £5 for the best round of the day. Harry Vardon had rounds of 84 and 87 and finished tied for 6th place. The weather on the second day was much better. Taylor and Herd met in the first semi-final, with Taylor winning 2 & 1. Vardon beat George Pulford 4 & 3 in the other semi-final. The final was very one-sided. In the first round Vardon won 13 holes to Taylor's 2 and finished the round 11 up. Vardon scored 71 for the round. The match finished at the 7th hole of the afternoon round where Vardon scored a two, Vardon winning the match 12 & 11.

== Winners ==
Year	Winner	Country	Venue	Margin of victory	Runner-up	Winner's share (£)	Ref
1898	Harry Vardon	Jersey	County Down Golf Club	12&11	(England) J.H. Taylor	40	
