= Great Triumvirate (golf) =

Group of three accomplished British golfers

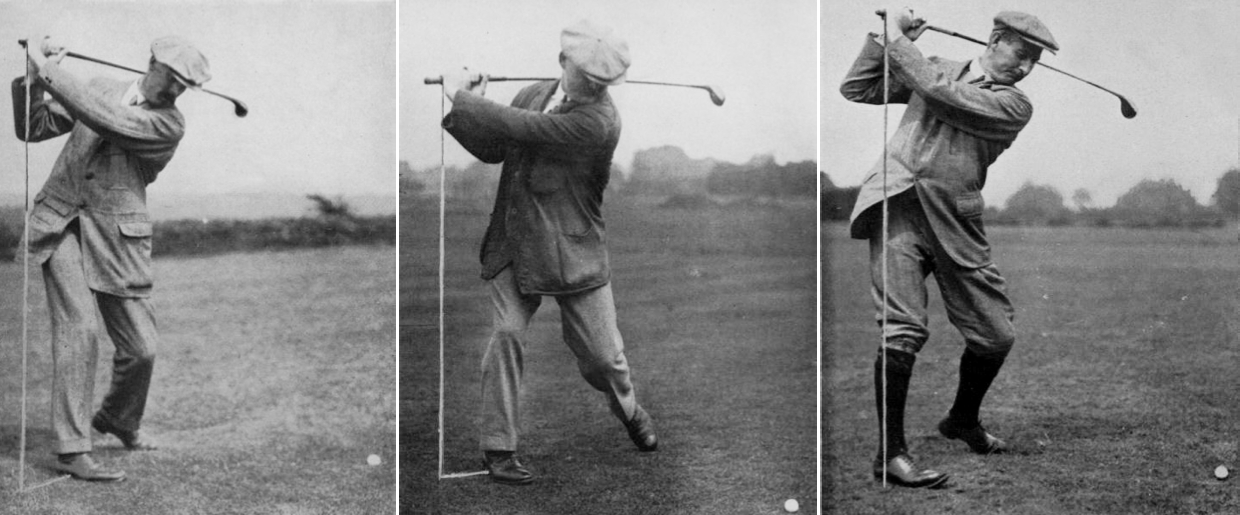
A backswing study of James Braid, John Henry Taylor, and Harry Vardon

The Great Triumvirate, in a golfing context, refers to the three leading British golfers of the late 19th and early 20th centuries: Harry Vardon, John Henry Taylor, and James Braid. The trio combined to win The Open Championship 16 times in the 21 tournaments held between 1894 and 1914; Vardon won six times with Braid and Taylor winning five apiece. In the five tournaments in this span the triumvirate did not win, one or more of them finished runner-up.

== Open Championship – other winners 1894–1914 ==
Year	Winner	Margin	Runner(s)-up
1897	(England) Harold Hilton (a)	1 stroke	(Scotland) James Braid
1902	(Scotland) Sandy Herd	1 stroke	(Scotland) James Braid, (Jersey) Harry Vardon
1904	(Scotland) Jack White	1 stroke	(Scotland) James Braid, (England) John Henry Taylor
1907	(France) Arnaud Massy	2 strokes	(England) John Henry Taylor
1912	(Jersey) Ted Ray	4 strokes	(Jersey) Harry Vardon
