= Frederick Guthrie Tait =

Scottish golfer and soldier

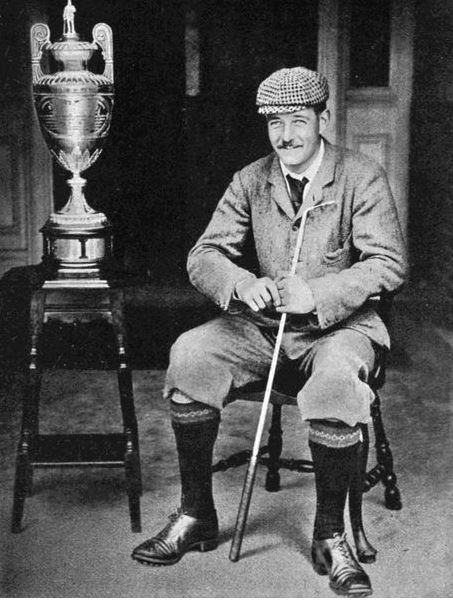
- Tait in 1896 after winning The Amateur Championship

Personal information
- Full name: Frederick Guthrie Tait
- Nationality: Scotland
- Born: 11 January 1870 Edinburgh, Scotland
- Died: 7 February 1900 (aged 30)
- Height: 5 ft 11.5 in (1.82 m)
- Weight: 174 lb (79 kg; 12.4 st)

Career
- Sport: Golf
- Status: Amateur

Best results in major championships (wins: 2)
- U.S. Open: DNP
- The Open Championship: T3: 1896, 1897
- U.S. Amateur: DNP
- British Amateur: Won: 1896, 1898

Frederick Guthrie Tait (11 January 1870 – 7 February 1900) was an amateur golfer and Scottish soldier. He won the Amateur Championship twice, in 1896 and again in 1898, by convincing margins. Over his short golf career, Tait recorded at least 28 tournament victories. He tied for third place in the Open Championship in both 1896 and 1897.

== Early life ==
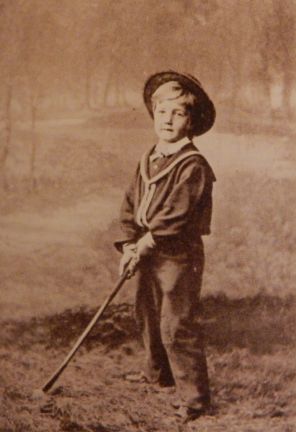
Tait as a toddler golfer with a hand-made club, c. 1875

Born at 17 Drummond Place in the Second New Town in Edinburgh, Tait was the third son of eminent physicist and fanatical amateur golfer Peter Guthrie Tait.

The young Tait was educated at the Edinburgh Academy and Sedbergh School. He was admitted to the Royal Military College, Sandhurst, at his second attempt, and is credited with introducing golf there. Tait was commissioned a second lieutenant in the 2nd battalion the Leinster Regiment in 1890, and then transferred as a lieutenant to the 2nd battalion, the Black Watch, in 1894.

He learned golf at an early age and was already swinging golf clubs as a 5-year-old child. As an adult, Tait was an extremely powerful and long hitter of the ball. At The Royal and Ancient Golf Club of St Andrews on 11 January 1893, he hit the ball 250 yards, the ball then rolling on frozen ground and coming to rest 341 yards from the tee.

250 yards was the exact driving distance predicted possible through a careful application of backspin by Tait's father in a paper of 1891, significantly further than the 180 yards achieved at that time. Tait won The Amateur Championship twice (1896 and 1898), finished third in The Open Championship twice (1896 and 1897) and was leading amateur in the same competition on three occasions.

== Death and legacy ==
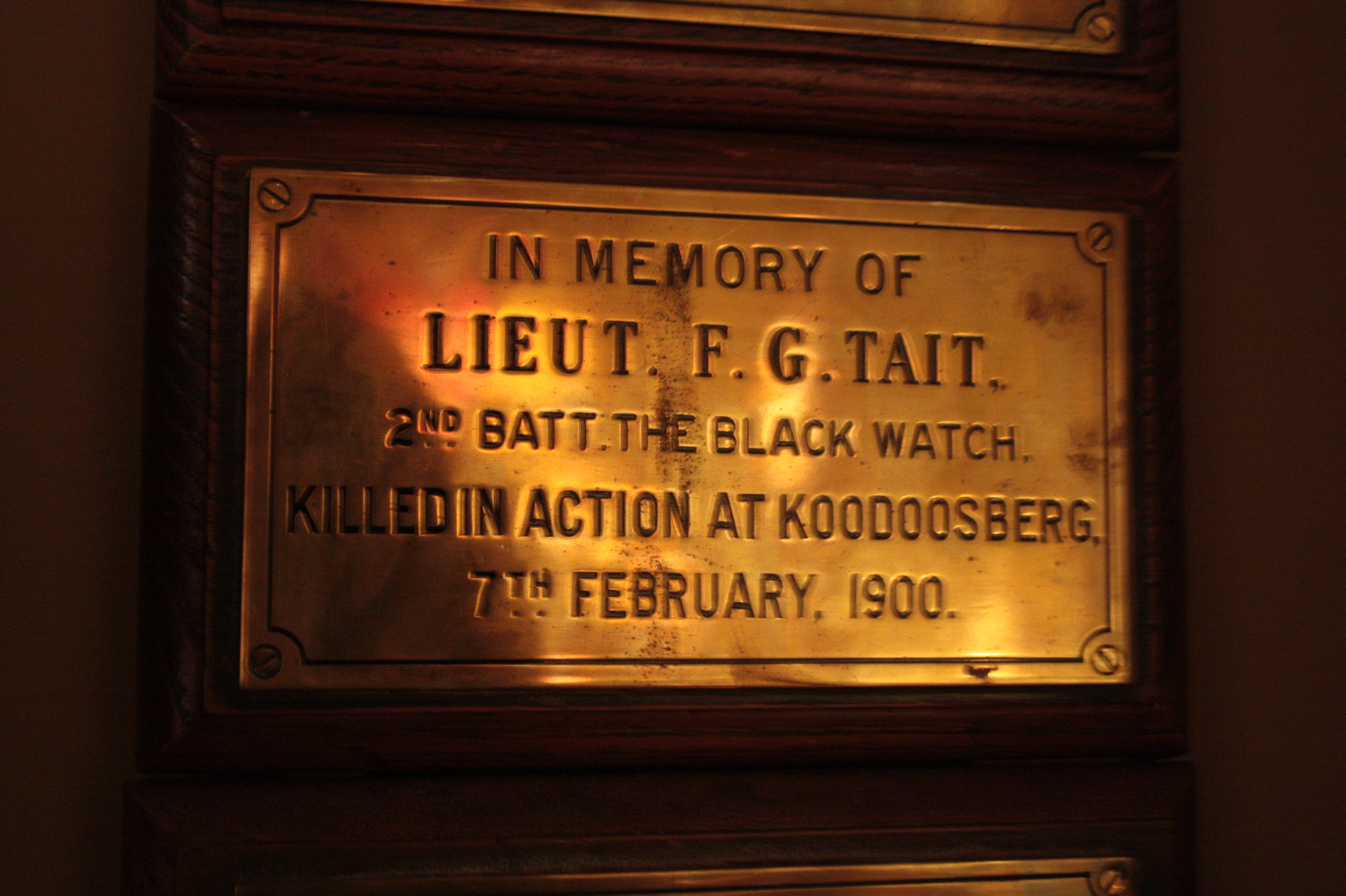
Memorial plaque to Frederick Guthrie Tait, Black Watch Museum, Perth

Having already been wounded at Magersfontein, Tait was killed having only just rejoined the Black Watch when General MacDonald led the decimated Highland Brigade once more into action at Koodoosberg, South Africa, during the Second Boer War on 7 February 1900 and is buried there.

A memorial plaque to his (and his father's) memory stands on the inner north wall of St John's Episcopal Church on Princes Street in Edinburgh.

He is also remembered in the adjacent churchyard by a granite Celtic cross on the Tait family plot on the second burial terrace down from Princes Street.

A memorial plaque from Dunalister Veterans Home is now rehoused in the Black Watch Museum in Perth.

== Honours ==
The Freddie Tait Cup is awarded annually to the leading amateur in the South African Open.

== Tournament wins (24) ==
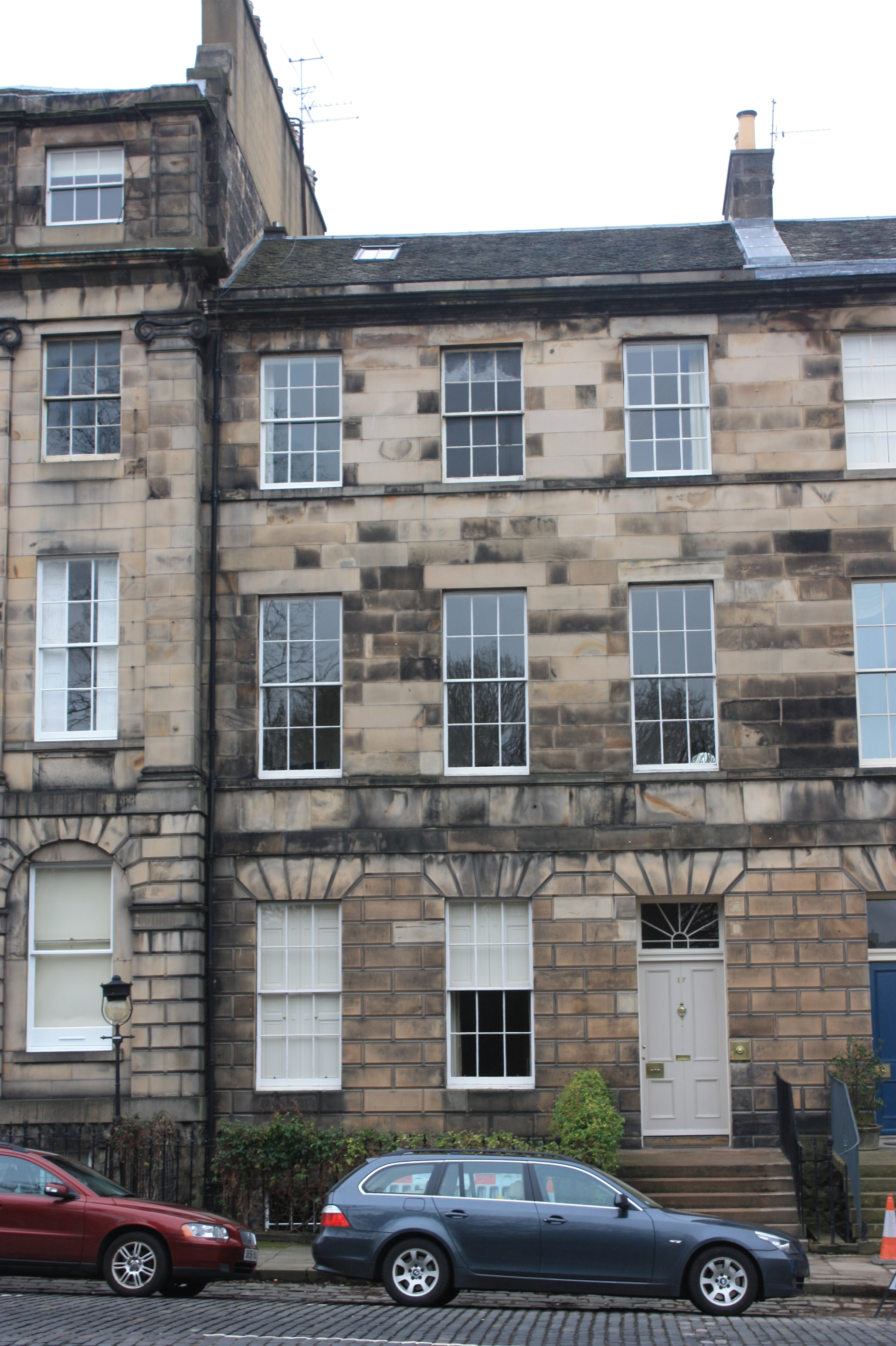
Tait's birthplace at 17 Drummond Place, Edinburgh

Note: This list may be incomplete.

- 1894 Royal and Ancient Golf Club Royal Medal
- 1894 Hampshire Isle of Wight and Channel Islands Amateur Champion
- 1895 Royal and Ancient Golf Club Jubilee Vase, New Luffness Leconfield Medal, New Luffness Silver Quaich, New Luffness Hope Medal
- 1896 The Amateur Championship, St. George's Challenge Cup, Royal and Ancient Golf Club Silver Cross Medal, Royal and Ancient Golf Club Royal Medal, Royal and Ancient Golf Club Glennie Aggregate Medal, Royal and Ancient Golf Club Calcutta Cup
- 1897 Royal and Ancient Golf Club Silver Cross Medal, Royal and Ancient Golf Club Glennie Aggregate Medal, New Luffness Leconfield Medal
- 1898 The Amateur Championship, St. George's Challenge Cup, New Luffness Hope Medal, New Luffness East Lothian County Cup
- 1899 St. George's Challenge Cup, Royal and Ancient Golf Club Silver Cross Medal, Royal and Ancient Golf Club Calcutta Cup, Royal and Ancient Golf Club Royal Medal, Royal and Ancient Golf Club Glennie Aggregate Medal

== Major championships ==
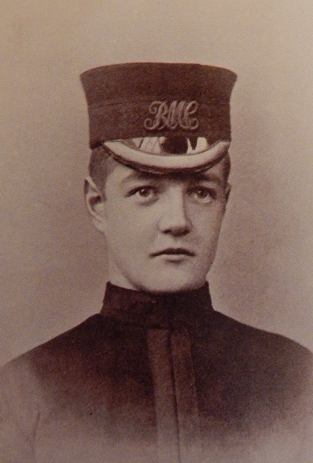
Tait at the Royal Military College, Sandhurst, c. 1888

Tait (back turned) with Edward Blackwell (center) and Old Tom Morris (right), 1899 at St Andrews, Scotland

=== Amateur wins (2) ===
Year	Championship	Winning score	Runner-up
1896	The Amateur Championship	8 & 7	(England) Harold Hilton
1898	The Amateur Championship	7 & 5	(Scotland) Samuel Mure Fergusson

=== Results timeline ===
Tournament	1891	1892	1893	1894	1895	1896	1897	1898	1899
The Open Championship	T30	T21		9 LA	T15	T3 LA	T3	5	T7 LA
The Amateur Championship		R32	SF	SF	SF	1	R32	1	2

Note: Tait played in only The Open Championship and The Amateur Championship.

Win
Top 10
Did not play

LA = Low amateur
"T" indicates a tie for a place
R32, R16, QF, SF = Round in which player lost in match play

Sources: Open Championship, Amateur Championship: 1892, 1893, 1894, 1895, 1897

== Bibliography ==
- Darwin, B. (1933). "Memories of Freddie Tait". The American Golfer. selections reprinted in Price, C., ed. (1964). The American golfer. New York: Random House.
- Durran, R. A. (2004). "Tait, Frederick Guthrie (1870–1900)". Oxford Dictionary of National Biography (online ed.). Oxford University Press. doi:10.1093/ref:odnb/36405. (Subscription, Wikipedia Library access or UK public library membership required.)
- Low, J. L. (1900). F. G. Tait: A Record.
- Low, J. L., ed. (1909). Nisbet's Golf Yearbook.
- Ryde, P., ed. (1981). Royal & Ancient Championship Records, 1860–1980.
