= Harry Vardon =

Jersey professional golfer (1870–1937)

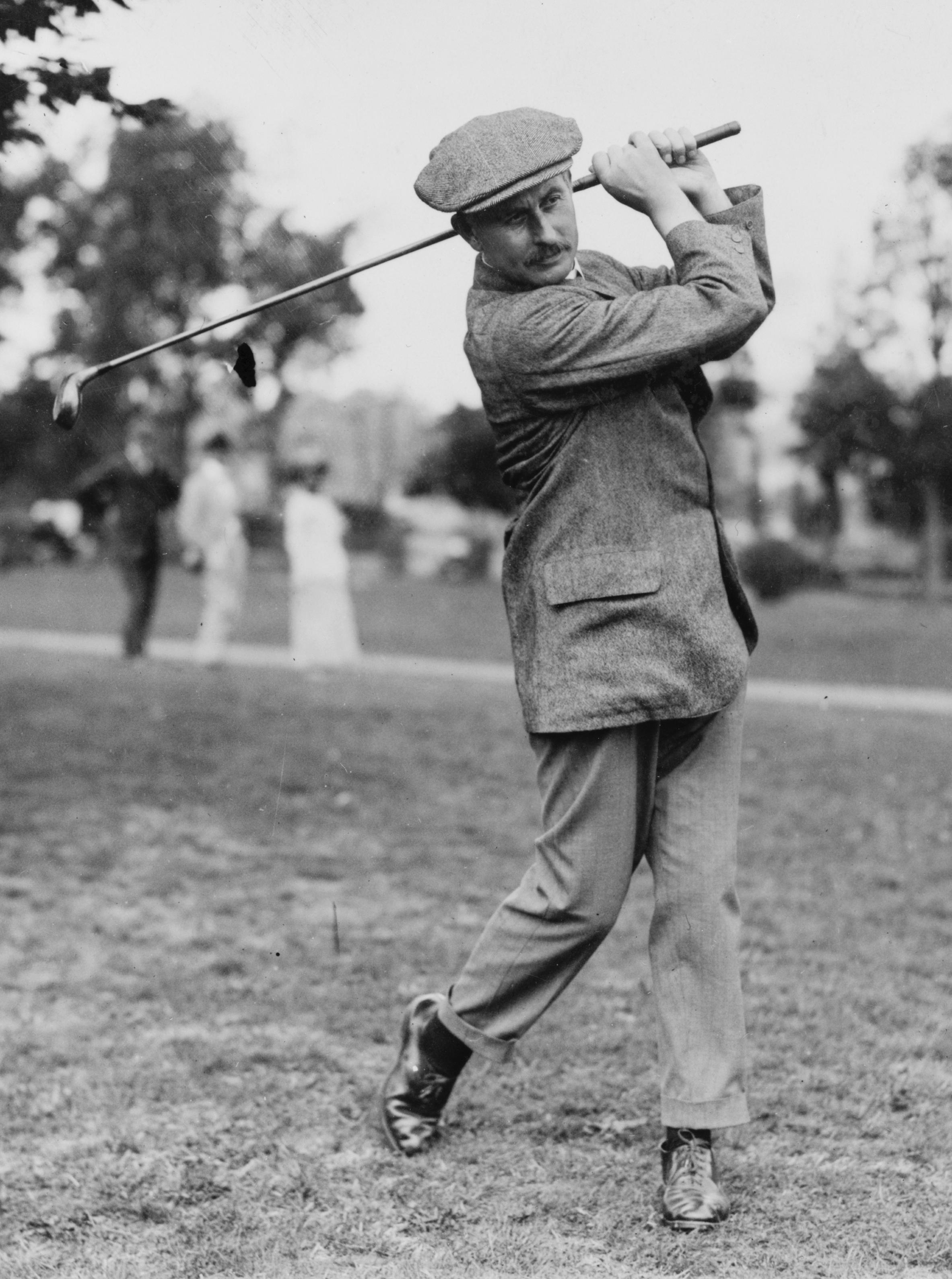
- Vardon, circa 1908–1914

Personal information
- Full name: Henry William Vardon
- Nicknames: Harry, The Stylist
- Nationality: Jersey
- Born: 9 May 1870 Grouville, Jersey, Channel Islands
- Died: 20 March 1937 (aged 66) Whetstone, London, England
- Height: 5 ft 9 in (175 cm)
- Weight: 11 st 7 lb (161 lb; 73 kg)
- Spouse: Jessie Bryant (d. 1946)

Career
- Sport: Golf
- Turned professional: 1890
- Professional wins: 49

Best results in major championships (wins: 7)
- U.S. Open: Won: 1900
- The Open Championship: Won: 1896, 1898, 1899, 1903, 1911, 1914

Achievements and awards
- World Golf Hall of Fame: 1974 (member page)

Harry William Vardon (9 May 1870 – 20 March 1937) was a professional golfer from Jersey. He was a member of the Great Triumvirate with John Henry Taylor and James Braid. Vardon won The Open Championship a record six times, and also won the 1900 U.S. Open. Known as "the Stylist," Vardon's success, as well as his contributions to technique and the sport's fashion, made him golf's first international star and significantly elevated the prestige of the professional golfer. With his total of seven, Vardon holds the most major championships of any golfer from the British and Irish Isles.

== Early life ==
Born in Grouville, Jersey, Channel Islands, Vardon, whose mother was French and father English, did not play much golf as a youngster, but showed natural talent for the sport as a young caddie in his teens. Harry and his brother Tom Vardon, younger by two years and also interested in golf, were very close. Their golf development was held back by poor family circumstances and their father was not supportive of his sons' golf interest.

== Professional career ==
Henry moved from Jersey to England first, to pursue a golf career. Harry went to England in the spring of 1890, taking a job as greenkeeper at age 20, at Studley Royal Golf Club, Ripon, Yorks. A year later he became club professional at Bury Golf Club, and in 1896 the club professional at Ganton Golf Club, in Yorkshire. In 1902, after eight years as the professional at Ganton Golf Club, Harry Vardon moved south and became the professional at South Herts where he was to remain until his death in 1937. By his early 20s, Harry developed a demanding practice program, the most ambitious seen to that time. He was the first professional golfer to play in knickerbockers – discarding the "proper" dress of an Englishman in an uncomfortable shirt and tie with a buttoned jacket.

In 1896, Vardon won the first of his six Open Championships (a record that still stands today). Vardon had rivalries with James Braid and J.H. Taylor, who each won five Open Championships; together the three formed the 'Great Triumvirate', and dominated worldwide golf from the mid-1890s to the mid-1910s. These rivalries increased the public's interest in golf.

=== Scottish challenge ===
In 1898, Vardon won his second Open Championship at Prestwick Golf Club, beating Willie Park, Jnr by a single stroke. Park missed a makeable putt on the 18th green to take the match to a play off. So aggrieved was Park that he immediately offered a challenge to Vardon to play him over 72 holes, 36 holes at his home course of Musselburgh and 36 holes at a golf course of Vardon's choosing, for a wager of £100 per side. Park had offered similar challenges before; some years earlier he had met and defeated Ben Sayers at Musselburgh and North Berwick, and in 1897 Park defeated J.H. Taylor over two venues, also for £100 per side. Vardon refused Park's challenge; besides the £100 per side, Vardon had nothing to gain from such a match, and he most certainly was not going to play Park at Musselburgh, where fan partisanship was less than courteous to rival players.

Eventually Park conceded to play his home leg at North Berwick Golf Club instead of Musselburgh, and Vardon chose his home course of Ganton, Yorkshire. Golf Week magazine acted as both promoter and stakeholder, and the match took place in July 1899, by which time Vardon had won his third Open Championship. The British press billed the encounter as the greatest golf competition of all time. Such was the interest that 10,000 Scottish fans attended the match at North Berwick, and that on a day when the Prince of Wales (later King Edward VII) was making a State visit to nearby Edinburgh. Special trains were laid on to ferry fans from Edinburgh and other nearby towns. The format of the competition was match play. The first 36 holes at North Berwick ended with Vardon holding a two-hole lead. The second leg took place two weeks later at Ganton, and Vardon completed the rout, winning 11 up with ten holes to play, collecting the £200 prize and the glory.

=== Tours United States and Canada ===
During his career, Harry Vardon made three visits to North America, in 1900, 1913 and 1920. During all three trips he competed in the U.S. Open finishing 1st, 2nd and tied 2nd.

He became golf's first international celebrity in 1900 when he toured the United States and Canada. John Henry Taylor, the 1900 Open Champion and member of the Great Triumvirate, also traveled to the USA on a mini tour in 1900. Vardon played in more than 90 matches and capped it off with a victory in the U.S. Open, where Taylor was second. Vardon wrote that while on this tour, he lost only two matches while playing head-to-head against a single opponent, and both were against the Boston professional Bernard (Ben) Nicholls, older brother of Gilbert Nicholls; the Nicholls brothers had recently emigrated from the British Isles. In 1913, accompanied by Ted Ray, Vardon played in 45 exhibition matches winning 36 of them, and in 1920 at age 50, again accompanied by Ray, he played from July to the beginning of November in nearly 100 exhibition/challenge matches against the likes of Walter Hagen, Jim Barnes, Francis Ouimet and Bobby Jones.

=== Twice runner-up in U.S. Opens ===
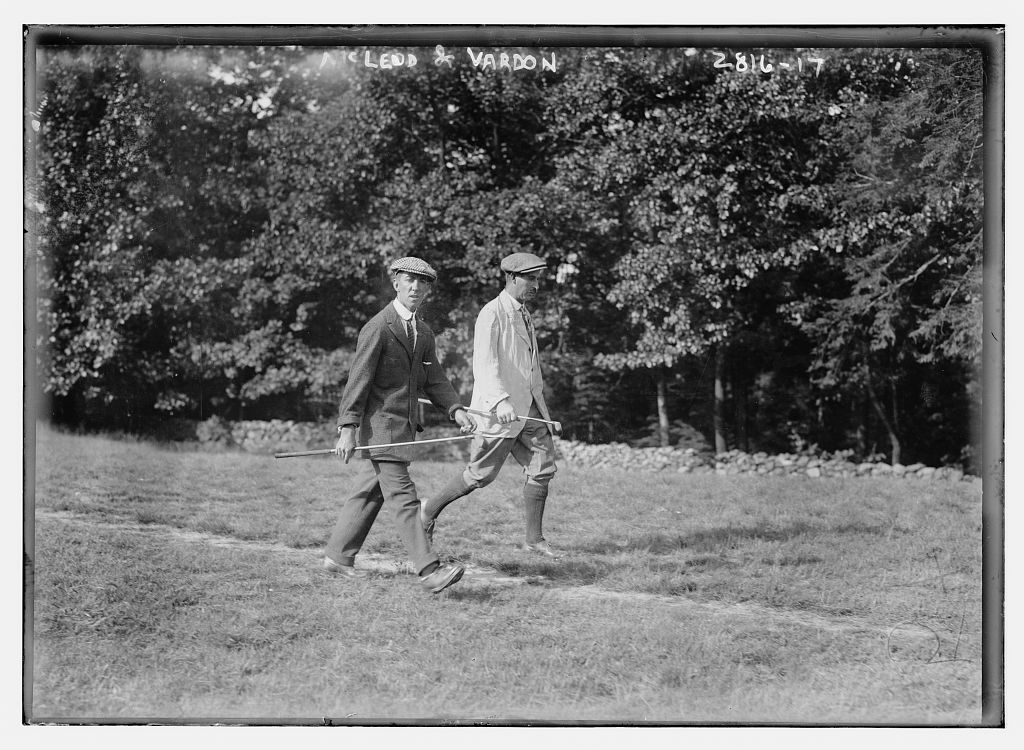
Fred McLeod and Vardon at the 1913 U.S. Open

Vardon was the runner-up, after a playoff loss to the 20-year-old Ouimet, at his next U.S. Open in 1913, an event portrayed in the film The Greatest Game Ever Played. He toured North America with Ted Ray that year, as he did once more in 1920. At the age of 50, Vardon was again tied runner-up in his third and final U.S. Open appearance, in 1920; he was leading with a few holes to play.

=== Career accomplishments ===
During his career, Vardon won 48 tournaments and 21 team events; that was the most titles won by a single player to that juncture in golf history. He won the German Open in 1911 and the British PGA Matchplay Championship in 1912. Between 1898 and 1899 Vardon played in 17 tournaments, winning 14 and coming 2nd in the other three. Vardon popularised the overlapping grip that bears his name, one still used by over 90 percent of golfers; this grip had been originated by Johnny Laidlay a few years before Vardon adopted it. In his later years, he became a golf course architect, designing several courses in Britain, Llandrindod Wells Golf Club, Woodhall Spa and Radcliffe-on-Trent being notable examples.

== Death and legacy ==
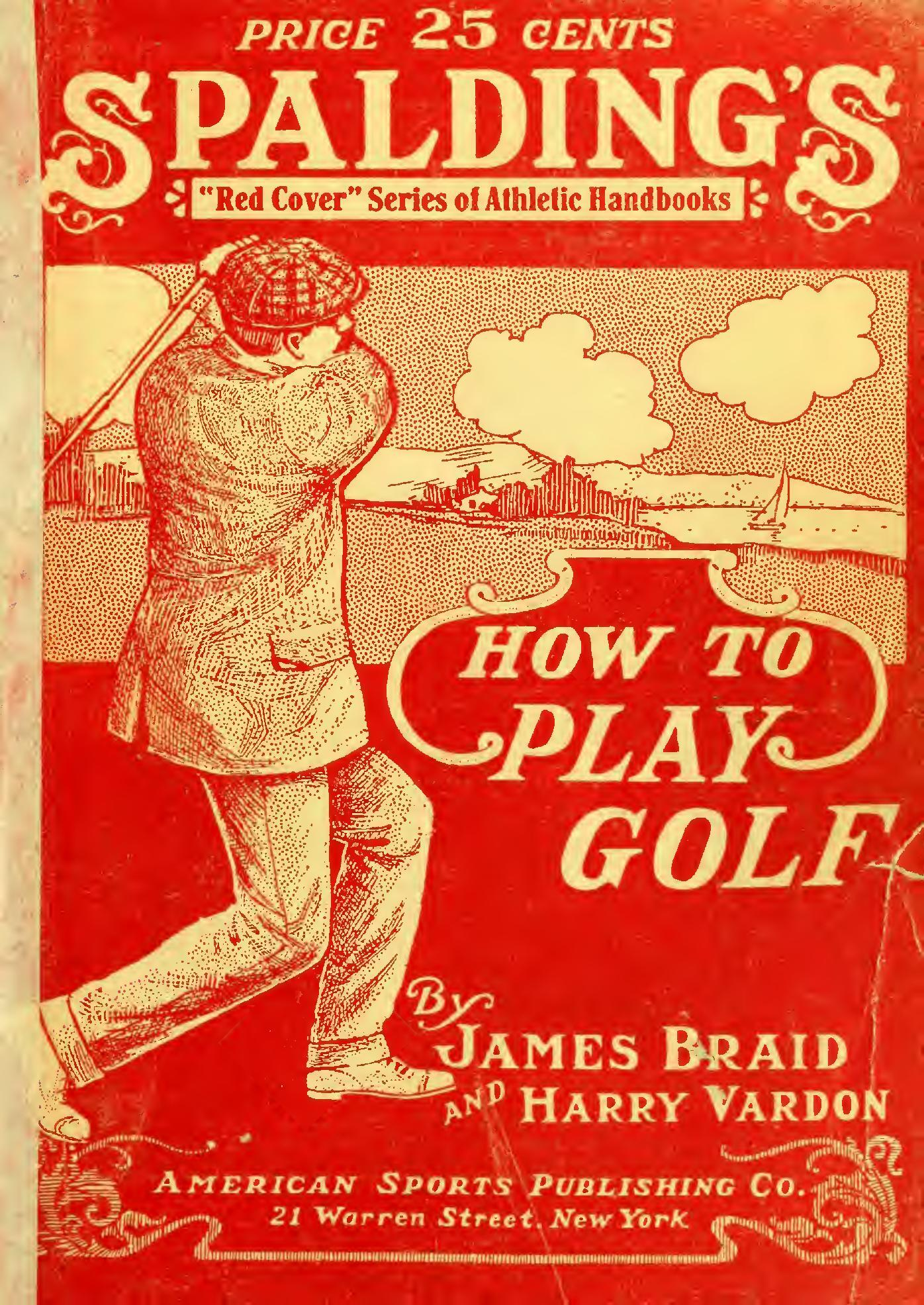
"How to Play Golf" cover

Following a bout with tuberculosis in 1903, Vardon struggled with health problems for years, but turned to coaching and writing golf instruction and inspirational books. After his comeback to the game following a prolonged absence while recovering from tuberculosis, he experienced serious problems with his short-range putting as a result of nerve damage to his right hand, and several commentators claim that he could have added to his list of majors had this disability not afflicted him. Vardon and James Braid collaborated on several editions of Spalding Athletic Library "How to Play Golf".

Vardon died in 1937 at the age 66, of pleurisy or possibly lung cancer, at his home at 14 (now number 35) Totteridge Lane, Whetstone, London, and is buried in St. Andrew's Church cemetery in Totteridge after a funeral service on 24 March. That year, the PGA of America created the Vardon Trophy, now awarded annually to the player on the PGA Tour with the year's lowest adjusted scoring average. The British PGA also created the Harry Vardon Trophy which now serves as the award for the winner of the European Tour's Race to Dubai. In 1974, Vardon was chosen as one of the initial group of inductees into the World Golf Hall of Fame. His most prestigious medals, including those from his six British Open Championships, are on display in a tribute to him at the Jersey Museum. In the annals of golf, he is considered one of the greats of the game. In 2000, Vardon was ranked as the 13th best golfer of all time by Golf Digest magazine. Vardon is often called "The Stylist", "Mr. Golf" and "The Icon of Golfing"; another nickname attached to him was "Greyhound".

== Vardon grip ==
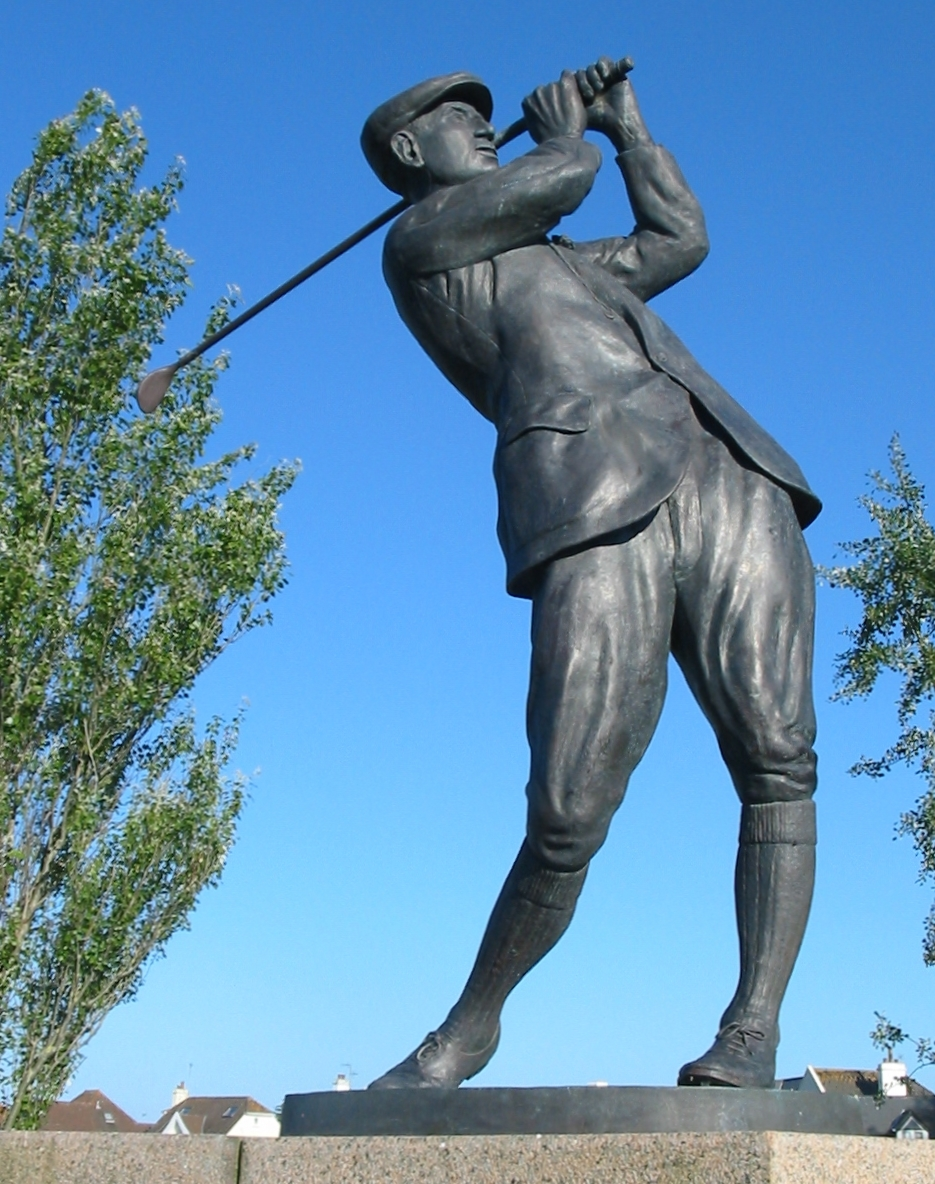
Statue of Vardon at the Royal Jersey Golf Club on the Island of Jersey

Vardon was also well known for the Vardon grip, or overlapping grip, the grip most popular among professional golfers. In the Vardon grip, one places the little finger of the trailing hand (the one placed lower on the club – right hand for a right-handed player) in between the index and middle finger on the leading hand (the hand that is higher on the club). The leading-hand thumb should fit in the lifeline of the trailing hand. Vardon actually took up this grip some time after Johnny Laidlay, a champion Scottish amateur player, invented it.

A visual depiction of the Vardon Grip is the logo of South Herts Golf Club where Vardon was the club professional from 1902 until his death in 1937

== In popular culture ==
- A biography of Vardon, published in 1991 and authored by his daughter-in-law, Audrey Howell, provides much intimate detail about the life of this champion.
- English actor Stephen Dillane portrayed Vardon in director Bill Paxton's 2005 film The Greatest Game Ever Played. A book of the same name (upon which the movie was based), written by Mark Frost, goes into great detail depicting Vardon's life.
- Irish-American actor Aidan Quinn portrayed Vardon in the 2004 film Bobby Jones: Stroke of Genius.
- Harry Vardon authored a golf instruction book, The Gist of Golf.
- A career record of Vardon, published in 2015 and authored by Bill Williams, provides a definitive list of the tournaments he played in and where he finished in the field.
- Bill Williams authored in 2016 a second book about Vardon, and his three trips to North America in 1900, 1913 and 1920. The book traces the beginnings of golf in America, the influence Vardon had in popularizing the game and his role in bringing about the Ryder Cup.

== Tournament wins (49) ==
Major championships are shown in bold.

=== Singles (48) ===
- 1896 **The Open Championship**, Pau Golf Club Invitational (Fra), Cleveland Golf Club Pro Tournament (Eng)
- 1897 Wallasey Open (Eng), Southport Open (Eng)
- 1898 **The Open Championship**, Royal Musselburgh Open (Sco), Prestwick St Nicholas Tournament (Sco), Windermere Invitational (Eng), Norbury Invitational (Eng), Carnoustie Pro Event (Sco), Earlsferry & Elie Professional Tournament (Sco), County Down Professional Tournament (Ire), Barton-on-Sea Invitational (Eng), Lytham St Annes Professional Tournament (Eng)
- 1899 **The Open Championship**, Cruden Bay Professional Tournament (Sco), Irish Championship Meeting Professional Tournament (Ire), Mid-Surrey Professional Meeting (Eng)
- 1900 **U.S. Open**
- 1901 Mid-Surrey Professional Tournament (Eng), Glamorganshire Golf Club Invitational (Wal)
- 1902 Leeds Cup (Eng), Witley Court Invitational (Eng), Edzell Golf Club Open Meeting (Sco)
- 1903 **The Open Championship**, Richmond Golf Club Invitational (Eng), Enfield Golf Club Invitational (Eng), Western Gailes Invitational (Sco)
- 1904 The Irvine Golf Club Match Play (Sco)
- 1905 Montrose Open (Sco)
- 1906 Musselburgh Tournament (Sco), News of the World Matchplay Southern Section qualifying at Stanmore (tie with James Braid) (Eng)
- 1907 Blackpool Park Invitational (Eng)
- 1908 Nice International Tournament (Fra), Costebelle Club Invitational (Fra)
- 1909 St Andrews Tournament (Sco)
- 1911 **The Open Championship**, Tooting Bec Cup (Eng), Bramshot Cup (Eng), German Open (Ger)
- 1912 Cooden Beach Open (Eng), News of the World Match Play (Eng)
- 1913 Sphere and Tatler Foursomes Southern Section qualifying at Denham (tie with James Batley) (Eng), US Open qualifying Tournament (USA)
- 1914 **The Open Championship**, Sphere and Tatler Foursomes Southern Section qualifying at Worplesdon (Eng), Cruden Bay Professional Tournament (Sco)

=== Foursomes (1) ===
- 1913 Sphere and Tatler Foursomes Tournament (Eng) – (with Tom Williamson)

== Team event wins ==
He won team events from 1899 to 1928.

- 1899 England vs Scotland International Foursome (36 holes match play) Vardon & John Ball vs Freddie Tait & Willie Park, Jr.
- 1905 England vs Scotland International Foursome (144 holes match play) Vardon & J.H. Taylor vs James Braid & Sandy Herd
- 1906 England vs Scotland at Muirfield (Sco) – England won 12 – 6
- 1907 England vs Scotland at Hoylake (Eng) – England won 8 – 5 (3 halved)
- 1908 Great Britain vs France at Cagnes (Fra) – Great Britain won 3 – 0
- 1909 England vs Scotland at Royal Cinque Ports (Eng) – England won 11 – 4 (3 halved)
- 1910 England vs Scotland at St Andrews (Sco) – England won 11 – 5 (2 halved)
- 1911 Coronation Match (Eng) – Professionals beat Amateurs 8 – 1
- 1913 England vs Scotland at Hoylake (Eng) – England won 13 – 4 (1 halved)
- 1914 International Charity Match (England vs Scotland) at Fulwell Golf Course (Eng) – England won 8 – 6 (4 halved)
- 1920 England vs Scotland at Moray Golf Club (Sco) – England won 7 – 5 (1 halved)
- 1921 Great Britain vs USA at Gleneagles (Sco) – GB won 9 – 3 (3 halved)
- 1928 Seniors vs Juniors at Verulam (Eng) – Seniors won 7 – 1 (2 halved)

== Major championships ==
=== Wins (7) ===
Year	Championship	54 holes	Winning score	Margin	Runner-up
1896	The Open Championship	4 shot deficit	83-78-78-77=316	Playoff ^{1}	(England) J.H. Taylor
1898	The Open Championship (2)	2 shot deficit	79-75-77-76=307	1 stroke	(Scotland) Willie Park, Jr.
1899	The Open Championship (3)	3 shot lead	76-76-81-77=310	5 strokes	(Scotland) Jack White
1900	U.S. Open	4 shot lead	79-78-76-80=313	2 strokes	(England) J.H. Taylor
1903	The Open Championship (4)	7 shot lead	73-77-72-78=300	6 strokes	(Jersey) Tom Vardon
1911	The Open Championship (5)	3 shot lead	74-74-75-80=303	Playoff ^{2}	(France) Arnaud Massy
1914	The Open Championship (6)	2 shot deficit	73-77-78-78=306	3 strokes	(England) J.H. Taylor

^{1} Defeated J.H. Taylor in 36-hole playoff by 4 strokes
^{2} Defeated Arnaud Massy in 36-hole playoff: Massy conceded on the 35th hole

=== Results timeline ===
Tournament	1893	1894	1895	1896	1897	1898	1899
U.S. Open	NYF	NYF					
The Open Championship	T23	T5	T9	1	6	1	1

Tournament	1900	1901	1902	1903	1904	1905	1906	1907	1908	1909
U.S. Open	1									
The Open Championship	2	2	T2	1	5	T9	3	T7	T5	T26

Tournament	1910	1911	1912	1913	1914	1915	1916	1917	1918	1919
U.S. Open				2				NT	NT	
The Open Championship	T16	1	2	T3	1	NT	NT	NT	NT	NT

Tournament	1920	1921	1922	1923	1924	1925	1926	1927	1928	1929
U.S. Open	T2									
The Open Championship	T14	T23	T8			T17	CUT	CUT	T47	CUT

Note: Vardon only played in The Open Championship and the U.S. Open.

Win
Top 10
Did not play

NYF = Tournament not yet founded
NT = No tournament
CUT = missed the half-way cut
"T" indicates a tie for a place

== Photo library ==
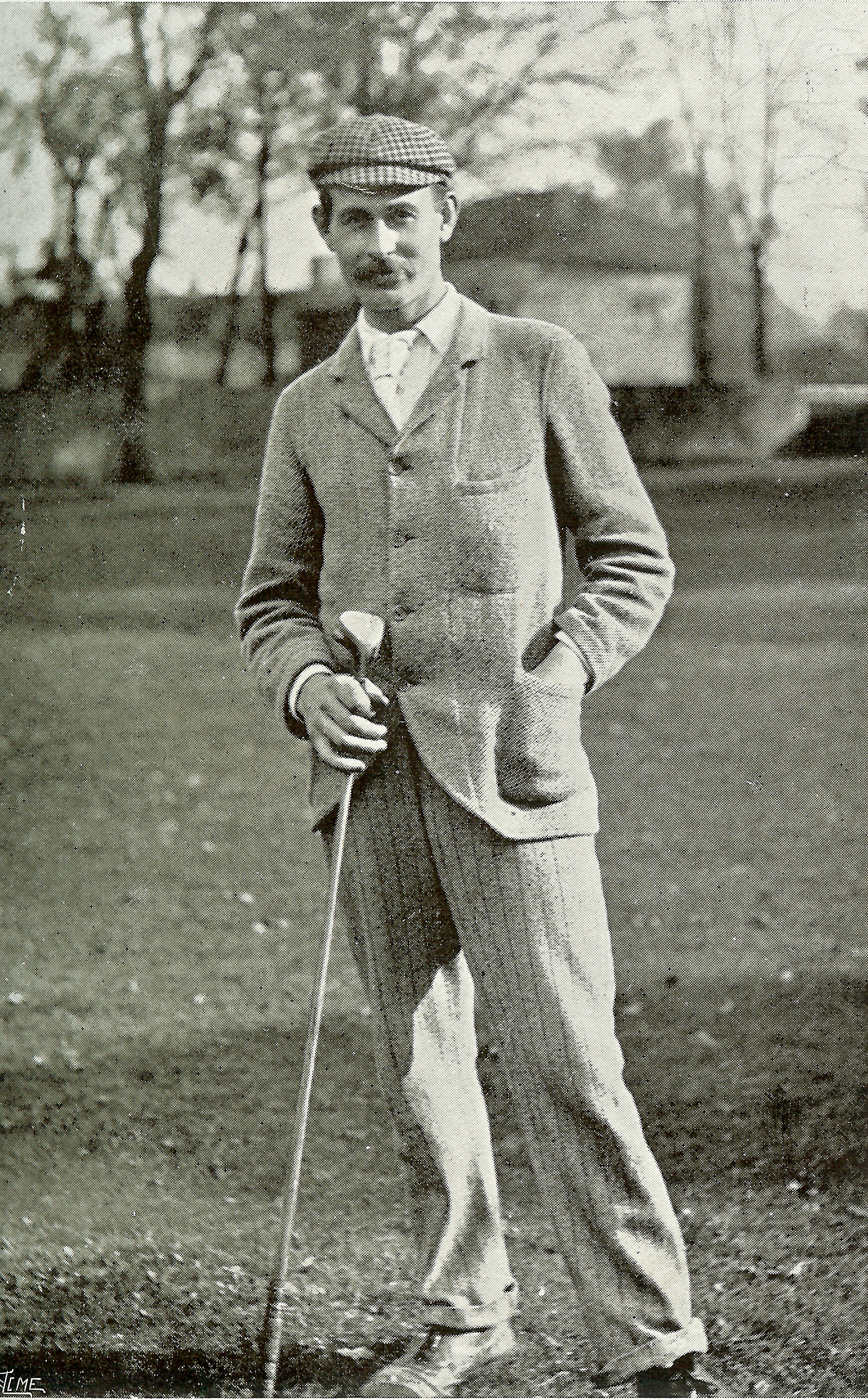
Harry Vardon 1899

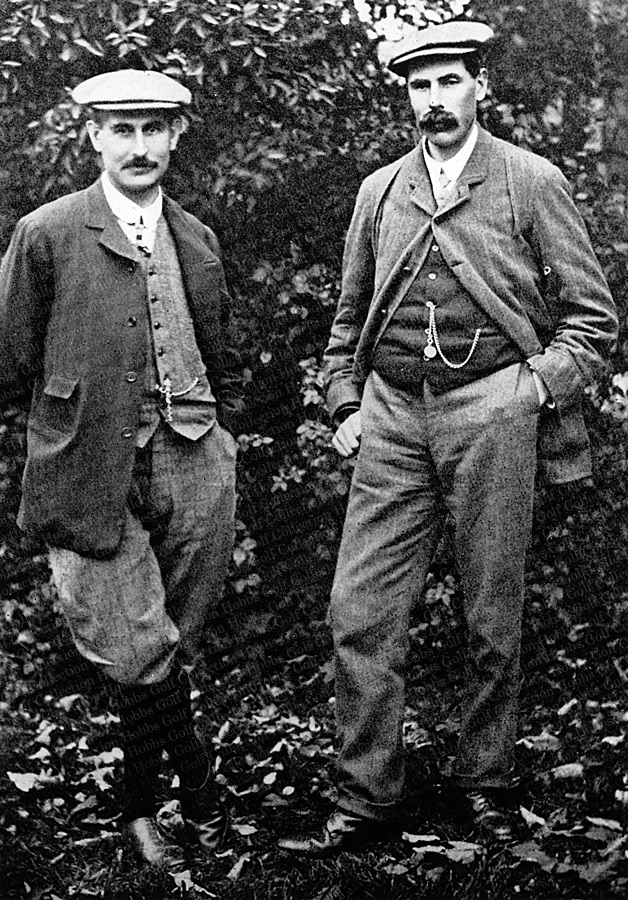
Vardon & James Braid

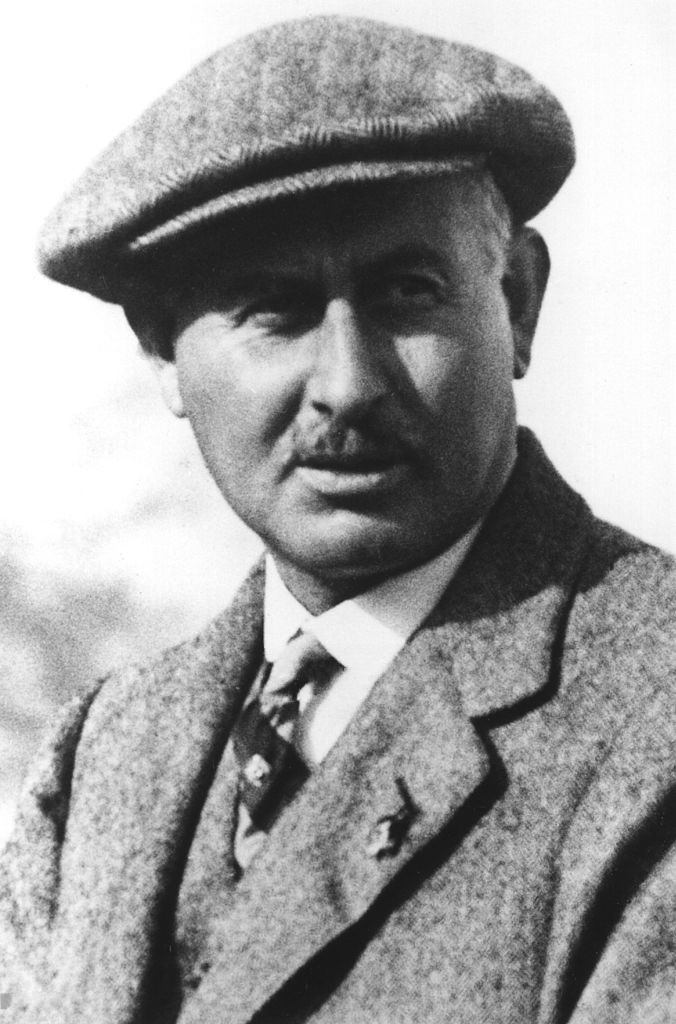
Harry Vardon

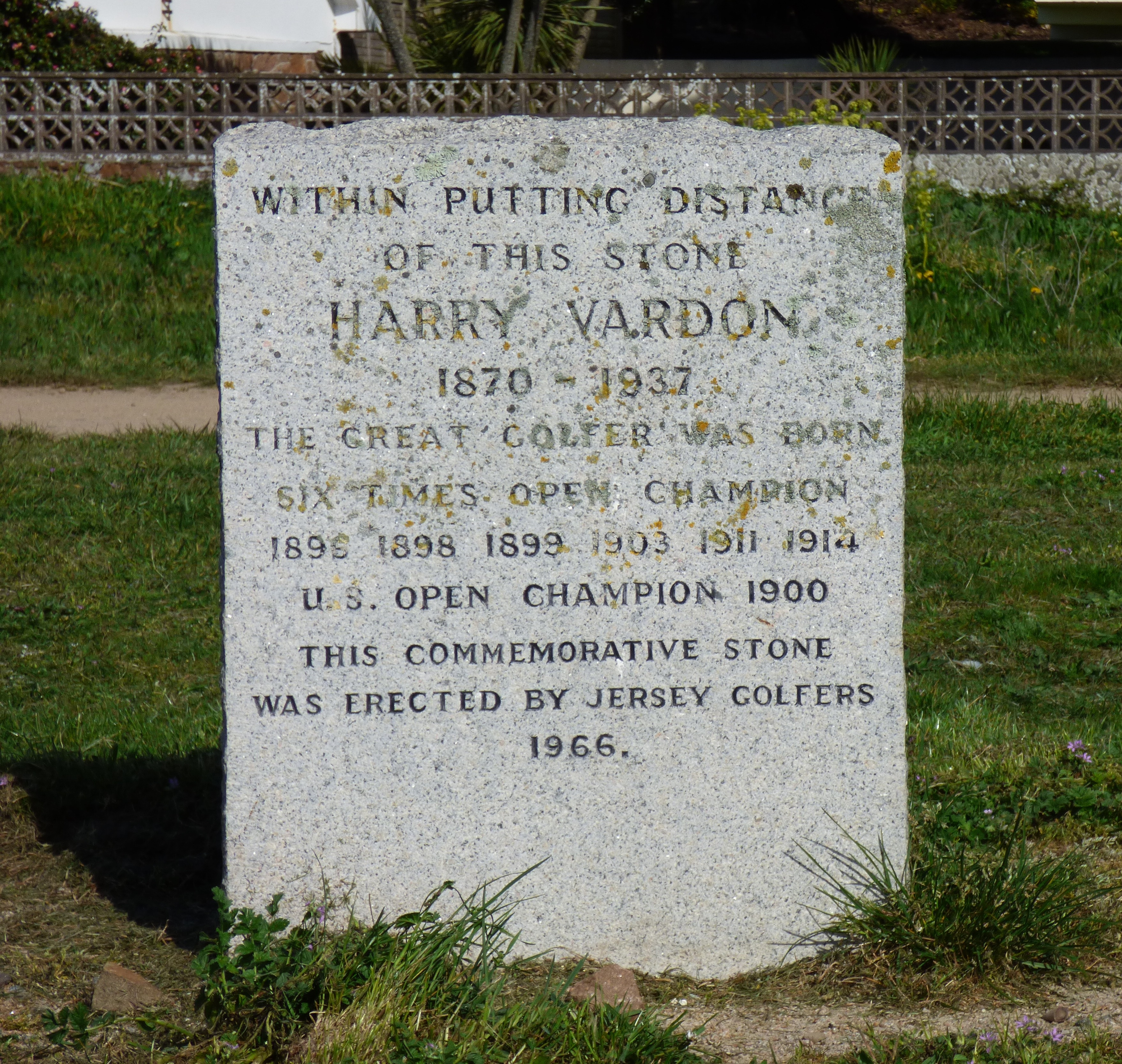
Royal Jersey G.C.

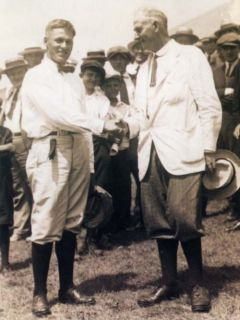
Bobby Jones & Vardon 1920 US Open

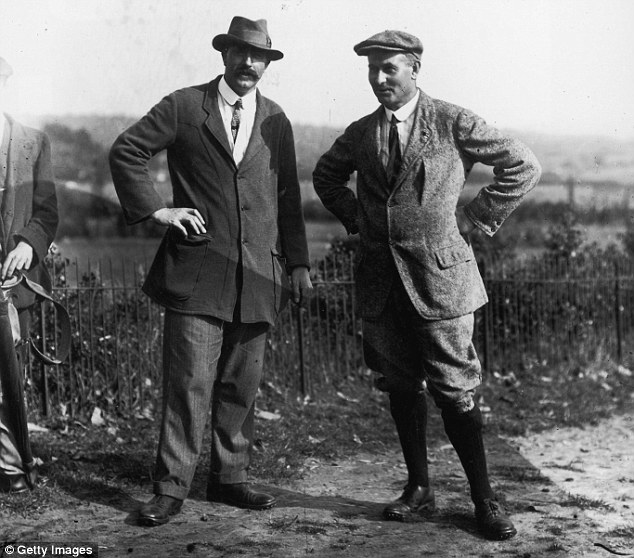
Ted Ray & Harry 1920

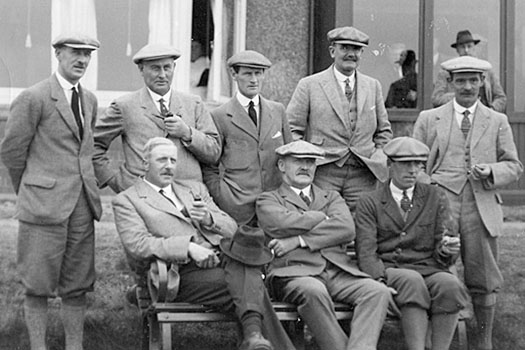
British Team 1921 at Gleneagles

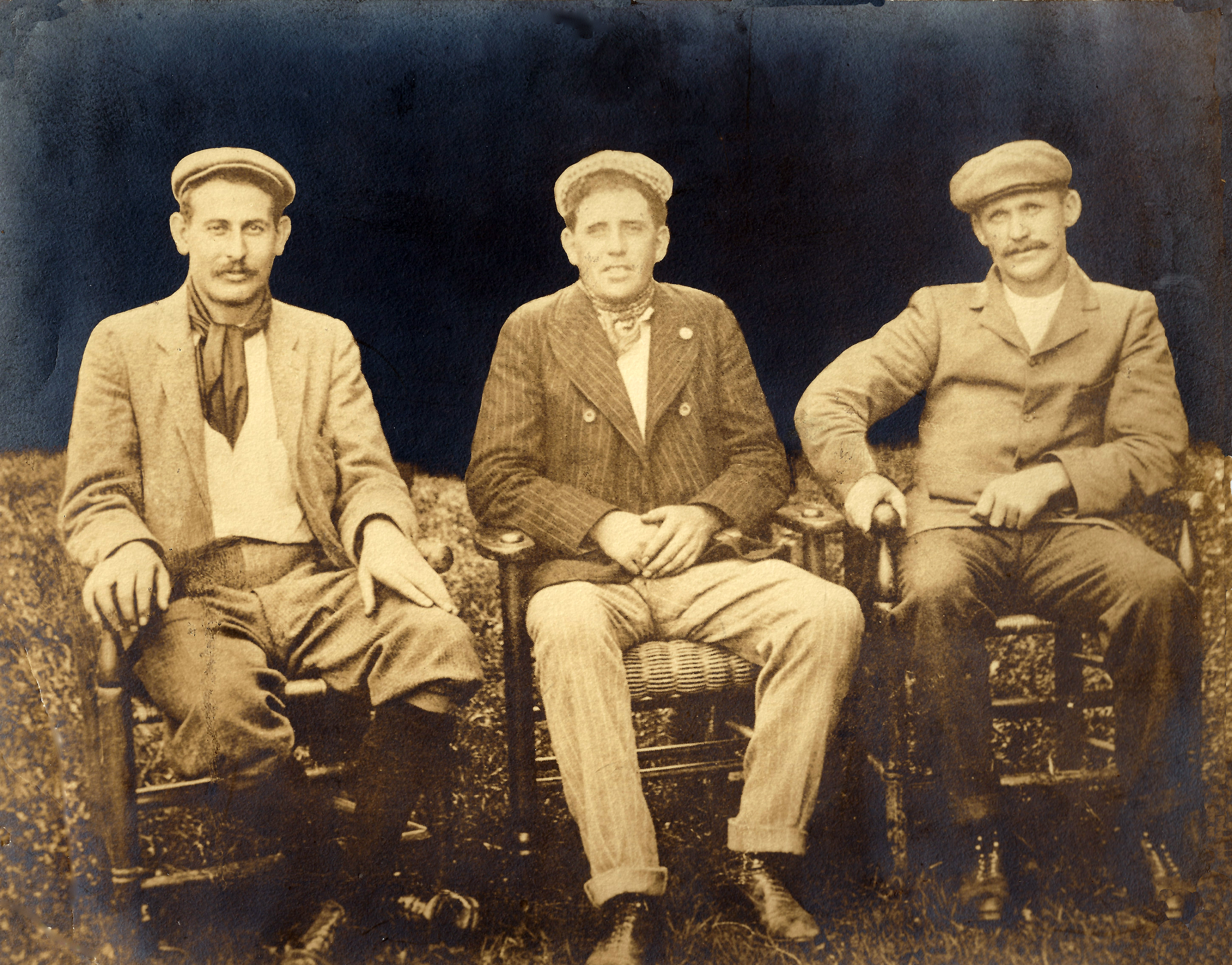
Vardon, Willie Anderson & J.H. Taylor 1900 US Open

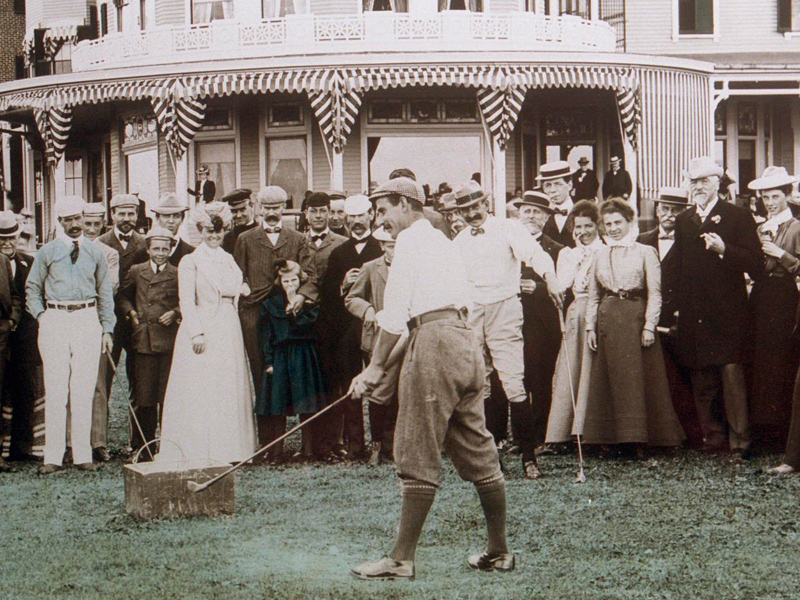
Harry Vardon at Poland Springs 1900

== Bibliography ==
- The Complete Golfer (1905)
- How to Play Golf (1907)
- Success at Golf (1914)
- Golf Club Selection (1916)
- Progressive Golf (1920)
- The Gist of Golf (1922)
- My Golfing Life (1933)

== See also ==
- List of men's major championships winning golfers
- List of golfers with most wins in one PGA Tour event
- Mundesley Golf Course
