= James Braid (golfer) =

Scottish professional golfer (1870–1950)

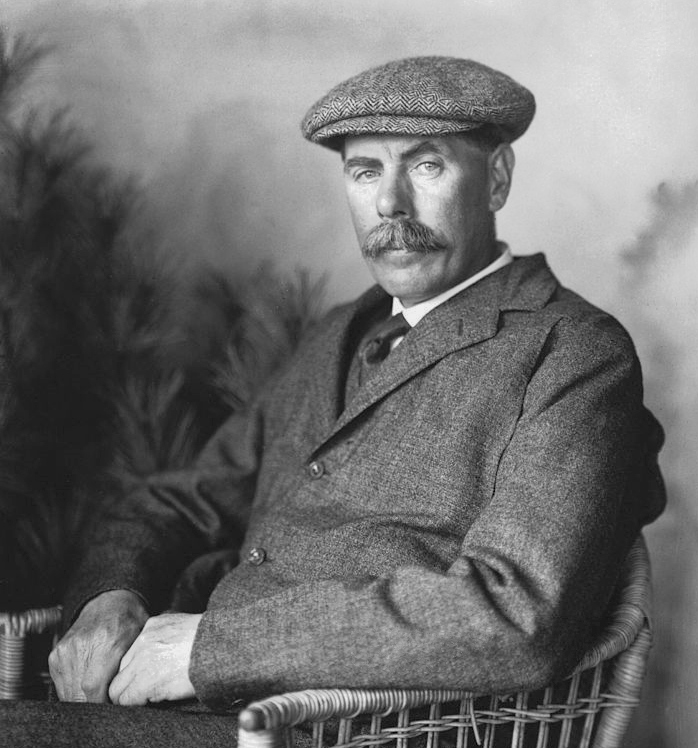
- Braid in 1904

Personal information
- Full name: James Braid
- Nationality: Scotland
- Born: 6 February 1870 Earlsferry, Fife, Scotland
- Died: 27 November 1950 (aged 80) London, England

Career
- Sport: Golf
- Status: Professional
- Professional wins: 19

Best results in major championships (wins: 5)
- Masters Tournament: DNP
- PGA Championship: DNP
- U.S. Open: DNP
- The Open Championship: Won: 1901, 1905, 1906, 1908, 1910

Achievements and awards
- World Golf Hall of Fame: 1976 (member page)

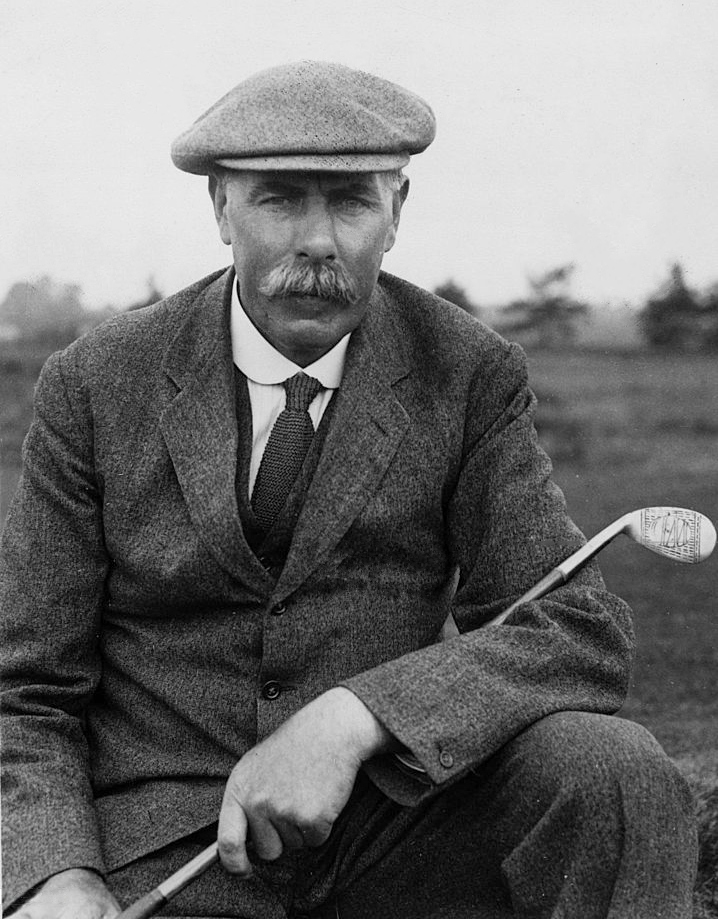
Braid in 1927

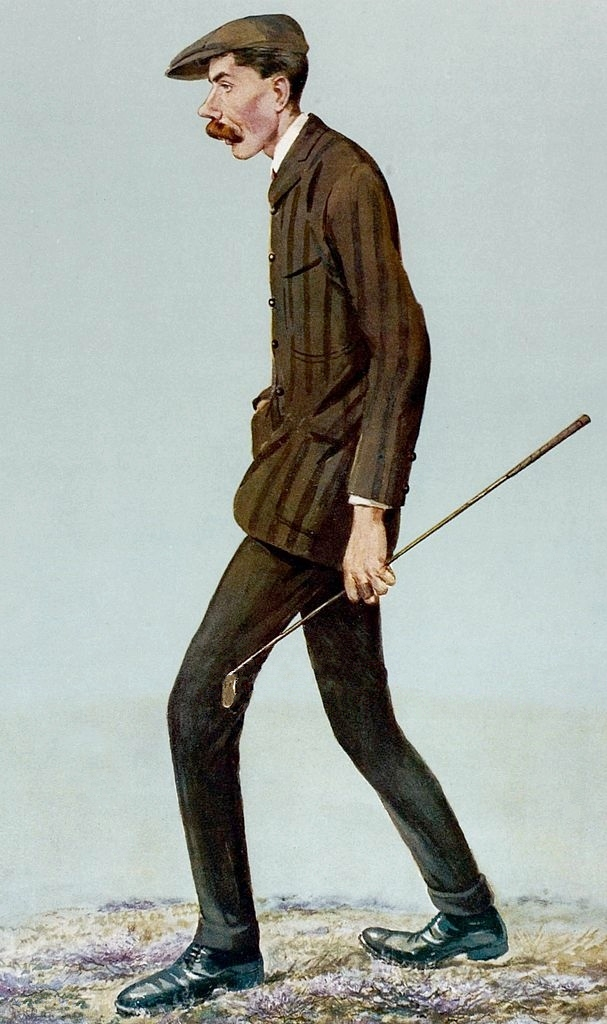
Braid caricatured by Spy for Vanity Fair, 1907

James Braid (6 February 1870 – 27 November 1950) was a Scottish professional golfer and a member of the Great Triumvirate of the sport alongside Harry Vardon and John Henry Taylor. He won The Open Championship five times. He also was a renowned golf course architect. Braid is a member of the World Golf Hall of Fame.

== Life ==
Braid was born in Earlsferry, Fife, Scotland, the son of James and Mary (née Harris). He played golf from an early age, working as a clubmaker before turning professional in 1896. Initially his game was hindered by problems with his putting, but he overcame this after switching to an aluminium putter in 1900. He won The Open Championship in 1901, 1905, 1906, 1908 and 1910. In addition, Braid won four British PGA Matchplay Championships (1903, 1905, 1907 and 1911), as well as the 1910 French Open title. He was also runner-up in The Open Championship in 1897, 1902, 1904, and 1909. His 1906 victory in The Open Championship was the last successful defence of the title by a European until Pádraig Harrington replicated the feat in 2008.

In 1912, Braid scaled back his tournament golf, and became a full-time club professional at Walton Heath; he had begun a relationship with that London-area club more than a decade before. He developed a very successful career in golf course design, and is sometimes regarded as the "inventor" of the dogleg, although holes of similar design had been known for centuries (for example, the Road Hole at the Old Course at St Andrews). Among his designs are the "King's Course" and the "Queen's Course" at Gleneagles, and the 1926 remodelling of The Open Championship venue Carnoustie Golf Links. In 1935, he designed and laid out Wishaw Golf Club.

Stranraer Golf Club's course was the final one that was designed by Braid in the year that he died, 1950. He was called out of retirement to plan Creachmore, which was to be his last commission. Braid never lived to see the course completed. He died in London on 27 November 1950.

Harry Vardon and Braid collaborated on several editions of Spalding Athletic Library "How to Play Golf". Braid also wrote "Advanced Golf, or, Hints and Instruction for Progressive Players" in 1911. There is also a book about all the courses Braid designed as an architect titled "James Braid and his 400 courses."

== Tournament wins (19) ==
Note: This list may be incomplete.

- 1901 **The Open Championship**, Lytham and St Anne's Professional Tournament
- 1902 Tooting Bec Cup, Greenore Professional Tournament
- 1903 News of the World Match Play, Tooting Bec Cup
- 1904 Tooting Bec Cup
- 1905 **The Open Championship**, News of the World Match Play
- 1906 **The Open Championship**
- 1907 News of the World Match Play, Tooting Bec Cup
- 1908 **The Open Championship**
- 1910 **The Open Championship**, French Open
- 1911 News of the World Match Play
- 1920 Galashiels Tournament, McVitie & Price Tournament (joint winner with Abe Mitchell), Amateurs and Professionals Foursomes Tournament (with J. H. Taylor)

Major championships are shown in bold.

== Major championships ==
=== Wins (5) ===
Year	Championship	54 holes	Winning score	Margin	Runner(s)-up
1901	The Open Championship	5 shot lead	79-76-74-80=309	3 strokes	(Jersey) Harry Vardon
1905	The Open Championship (2)	6 shot lead	81-78-78-81=318	5 strokes	(England) Rowland Jones, (England) J.H. Taylor
1906	The Open Championship (3)	3 shot deficit	77-76-74-73=300	4 strokes	(England) J.H. Taylor
1908	The Open Championship (4)	6 shot lead	70-72-77-72=291	8 strokes	(England) Tom Ball
1910	The Open Championship (5)	2 shot deficit	76-73-74-76=299	4 strokes	(Scotland) Sandy Herd

=== Results timeline ===
Tournament	1894	1895	1896	1897	1898	1899
The Open Championship	T10		6	2	T10	T5

Tournament	1900	1901	1902	1903	1904	1905	1906	1907	1908	1909
The Open Championship	3	**1**	T2	5	T2	**1**	**1**	T5	**1**	T2

Tournament	1910	1911	1912	1913	1914	1915	1916	1917	1918	1919
The Open Championship	**1**	T5	3	T18	T10	NT	NT	NT	NT	NT

Tournament	1920	1921	1922	1923	1924	1925	1926	1927	1928	1929
The Open Championship	T21	T16		T49	T18		T28	T30	T41	

Tournament	1930	1931	1932	1933	1934	1935	1936	1937	1938
The Open Championship									CUT

Note: Braid only played in The Open Championship

Win
Top 10
Did not play

NT = No tournament
CUT = missed the half-way cut
"T" indicates a tie for a place

== Team appearances ==
- England–Scotland Professional Match (representing Scotland): 1903 (winners), 1904 (tie), 1905 (tie), 1906, 1907, 1909, 1910, 1912 (tie)
- France vs Great Britain (representing Great Britain): 1908 (winners)
- Coronation Match (representing the Professionals): 1911 (winners)
- Great Britain vs USA (representing Great Britain): 1921 (winners)
- Seniors vs Juniors (representing the Seniors): 1928 (winners)

== Golf courses designed by Braid ==
Braid is reputed to have designed and remodeled over 200 golf courses. Braid disliked travel overseas, very rarely left the British Isles, and never traveled outside Europe. However, he did design two 18-hole golf courses for the Singapore Island Country Club in Asia, using topographic maps to plan his layouts there, which were then constructed to his orders.

Some of the more notable courses worked on by Braid are listed here.

- OD denotes courses for which Braid is the original designer
- R denotes courses reconstructed by Braid
- A denotes courses for which Braid made substantial additions
- E denotes courses that Braid examined and on the construction of which he consulted

Name	Contribution	Year built	City / Town	State / Province	Country	Comments
Renfrew GC	OD	1894	Renfrew	Renfrewshire	Scotland	
La Moye GC	OD	1902	Saint Brélade		Jersey	
Erskine GC	OD	1904	Erskine	Renfrewshire	Scotland	
Southport and Ainsdale GC	OD	1906	Southport	Merseyside	England	
Kirkhill GC	OD	1910	Cambuslang	South Lanarkshire	Scotland	
Gleneagles Hotel (King's Course, Queen's Course)	OD	1924	Auchterarder	Perth and Kinross	Scotland	
Singapore Island CC (Bukit Course, Island Course)	OD	1924			Singapore	36 holes
Carnoustie Golf Links (Championship Course)	R	1926	Carnoustie	Angus	Scotland	
Dalmahoy Hotel & CC (East Course, West Course)	OD	1929	Kirknewton	West Lothian	Scotland	
Lancaster GC	OD	1932	Lancaster	Lancashire	England	
Wishaw Golf Club	OD	1935	Wishaw	North Lanarkshire	Scotland	
St Austell Golf Club	E	1936	St Austell	Cornwall	England	

== See also ==
- List of men's major championships winning golfers
- List of golfers with most wins in one PGA Tour event
