= John Henry Taylor =

English professional golfer (1871–1963)

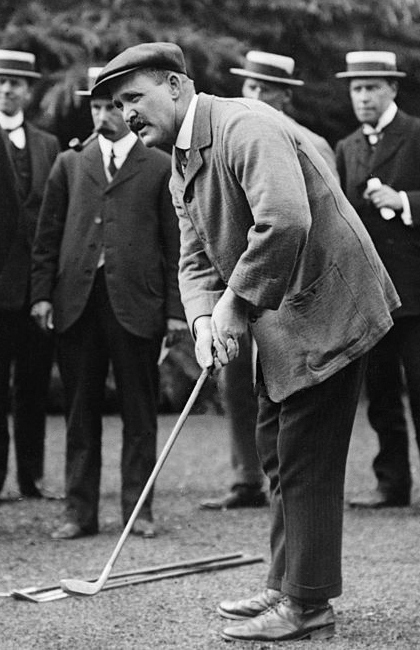
- Taylor in 1908

Personal information
- Full name: John Henry Taylor
- Nickname: J.H.
- Nationality: England
- Born: 19 March 1871 Northam, Devon, England
- Died: 10 February 1963 (aged 91) Northam, Devon, England

Career
- Sport: Golf
- Turned professional: 1890
- Professional wins: 19

Best results in major championships (wins: 5)
- U.S. Open: 2nd: 1900
- The Open Championship: Won: 1894, 1895, 1900, 1909, 1913

Achievements and awards
- World Golf Hall of Fame: 1975 (member page)

John Henry "J.H." Taylor (19 March 1871 – 10 February 1963) was an English professional golfer and one of the pioneers of the modern game of golf. Taylor is considered to be one of the best golfers of all time. He was a significant golf course architect. Taylor helped to found the British PGA, the world's first, and became respected for his administrative work. He also wrote two notable golf books.

== Early life ==
Taylor was born in Northam, Devon. He was a member of the fabled Great Triumvirate of the sport in his day, along with Harry Vardon and James Braid, and he won The Open Championship five times. Born into a working-class family, and orphaned as a boy, he began work as a caddie and labourer at the Royal North Devon Golf Club, near Westward Ho!, at the age of eleven. He was employed as a caddie and houseboy by the Hutchinson family and was tasked to carry the bag of Horace Hutchinson.

== Professional career ==
In 1890, Taylor became a professional golfer at the age of 19 and was employed by Burnham & Berrow Golf Club, the Winchester (later Royal Winchester) Golf Club – while there winning in successive years the first two of his Open Championships – then the Royal Wimbledon Golf Club, before eventually moving to the Royal Mid-Surrey Golf Club from 1899 until his retirement in 1946.

In 1901, Taylor was a co-founder and the first chairman of the British Professional Golfers' Association. This was the first association for professional golfers in the world. Bernard Darwin wrote that Taylor "had turned a feckless company into a self-respecting and respected body of men".

Taylor was a factor in the Open Championship from age 22 in 1893, until age 55, when he tied for 11th place in 1926. His five Open victories all took place before the First World War.

Open Championship wins:

- 1894 – Royal St George's
- 1895 – St Andrews
- 1900 – St Andrews
- 1909 – Royal Cinque Ports
- 1913 – Royal Liverpool Golf Club

Taylor captained the 1933 Great Britain Ryder Cup team to a win over the United States, and remains the only captain on either side never to have played in any of the matches.

Taylor was also involved in designing courses across England including York Golf Club in 1903, Hindhead Golf Club in 1904, Andover Golf Club in 1907, Frilford Heath's Red Course in 1908, Hainault Golf Club's Upper Course in 1909, Heaton Park Golf Club (Manchester) in 1912, Hainault Golf Club's Lower Course in 1923, Highwoods Golf Course in East Sussex in 1924, Bigbury Golf Club in South Devon in 1926, Pinner Hill Golf Club (Middlesex) 1927, Axe Cliff Golf Club (Seaton, Devon) in 1920s and Batchwood Hall Golf Club (St Albans) in 1935. He is attributed with being the inventor of the 'dogleg', although holes of that form had existed on many courses before Taylor began golf course design (for example No. 7 at Old Course at St Andrews and No. 4 at Prestwick Golf Club). In 1957, Taylor was also became president of Royal Birkdale, whose course he had designed.

== Awards and honors ==
- In 1949, Taylor was made an honorary member of The Royal and Ancient Golf Club of St Andrews
- A housing development in his hometown of Northam, JH Taylor Drive, was named in his honour

== Tournament wins ==
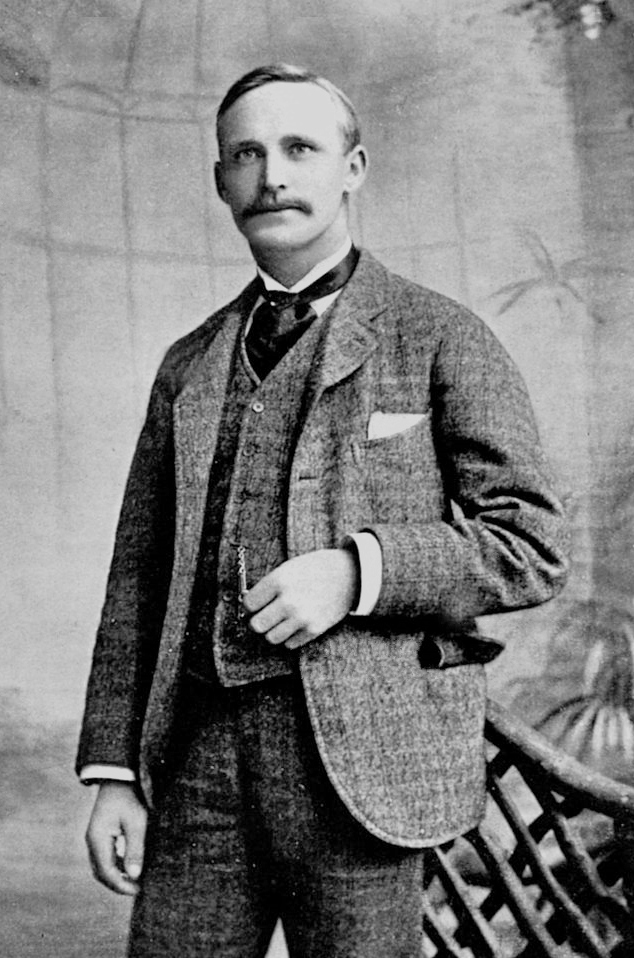
Taylor c. 1895

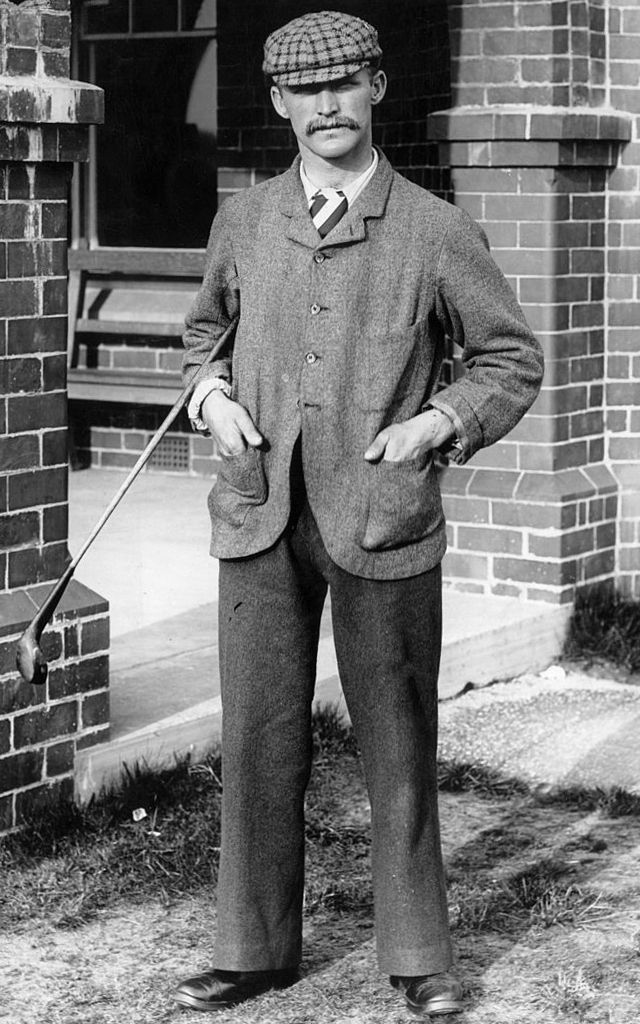
Taylor c. 1900

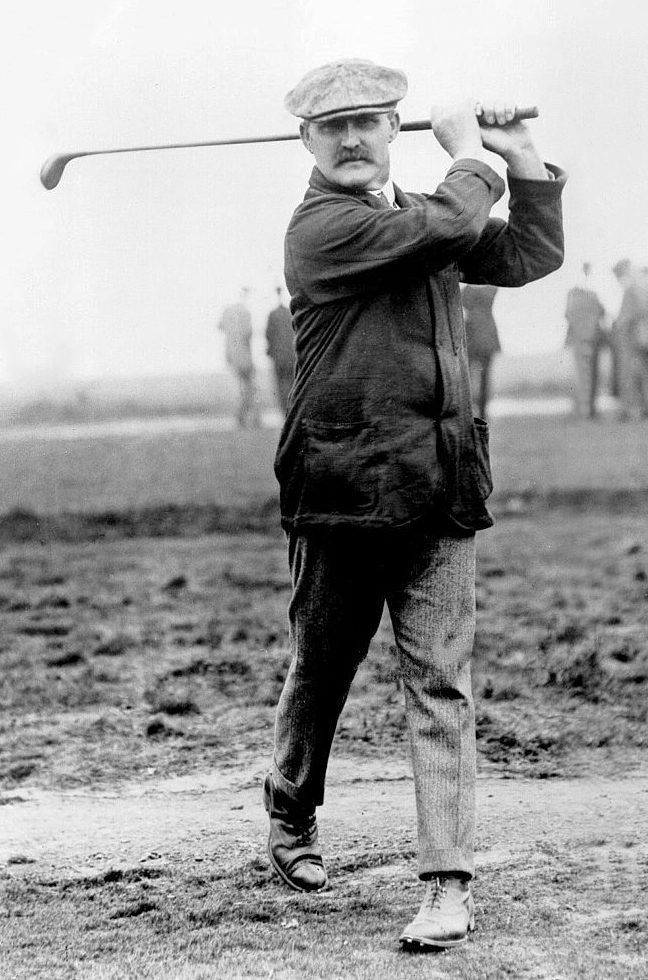
Taylor in 1912

Note: This list may be incomplete

- 1891 Challenge Match Play (Eng)
- 1894 **The Open Championship**
- 1895 **The Open Championship**
- 1900 **The Open Championship**
- 1901 Tooting Bec Cup, Islay Tournament, West Lancashire Professional Tournament
- 1904 News of the World Match Play
- 1908 French Open, News of the World Match Play
- 1909 **The Open Championship**, Cruden Bay Professional Tournament, French Open
- 1910 Southern Professional Foursomes Tournament (with Josh Taylor)
- 1912 German Open
- 1913 **The Open Championship**
- 1919 St Annes Old Links Tournament
- 1920 Amateurs and Professionals Foursomes Tournament (with James Braid)
- 1921 Roehampton Invitation Tournament

Major championships are shown in bold.

== Major championships ==
=== Wins (5) ===
| Year | Championship | 54 holes | Winning score | Margin | Runner(s)-up |
|---|---|---|---|---|---|
| 1894 | The Open Championship | 3 shot lead | 84-80-81-81=326 | 5 strokes | (Scotland) Douglas Rolland |
| 1895 | The Open Championship (2) | 3 shot deficit | 86-78-80-78=322 | 4 strokes | (Scotland) Sandy Herd |
| 1900 | The Open Championship (3) | 6 shot lead | 79-77-78-75=309 | 8 strokes | (Jersey) Harry Vardon |
| 1909 | The Open Championship (4) | 4 shot lead | 74-73-74-74=295 | 6 strokes | (England) Tom Ball, (Scotland) James Braid |
| 1913 | The Open Championship (5) | 3 shot lead | 73-75-77-79=304 | 8 strokes | (Jersey) Ted Ray |

=== Results timeline ===
| Tournament | 1893 | 1894 | 1895 | 1896 | 1897 | 1898 | 1899 |
|---|---|---|---|---|---|---|---|
| U.S. Open | NYF | NYF | | | | | |
| The Open Championship | T10 | **1** | **1** | 2 | T10 | 4 | 4 |

| Tournament | 1900 | 1901 | 1902 | 1903 | 1904 | 1905 | 1906 | 1907 | 1908 | 1909 |
|---|---|---|---|---|---|---|---|---|---|---|
| U.S. Open | 2 | | | | | | | | | |
| The Open Championship | **1** | 3 | T6 | T9 | T2 | T2 | 2 | 2 | T7 | **1** |

| Tournament | 1910 | 1911 | 1912 | 1913 | 1914 | 1915 | 1916 | 1917 | 1918 | 1919 |
|---|---|---|---|---|---|---|---|---|---|---|
| U.S. Open | | | | T30 | | | | NT | NT | |
| The Open Championship | T14 | T5 | T11 | **1** | 2 | NT | NT | NT | NT | NT |

| Tournament | 1920 | 1921 | 1922 | 1923 | 1924 | 1925 | 1926 | 1927 | 1928 | 1929 |
|---|---|---|---|---|---|---|---|---|---|---|
| U.S. Open | | | | | | | | | | |
| The Open Championship | 12 | T26 | 6 | T44 | 5 | T6 | T11 | 49 | | CUT |

Note: Taylor only played in The Open Championship and the U.S. Open.

Win
Top 10
Did not play

NYF = Tournament not yet founded
NT = No tournament
CUT = missed the half-way cut
"T" indicates a tie for a place

== Team appearances ==
- England–Scotland Professional Match (representing England): 1903, 1904 (tie), 1905 (tie), 1906 (winners) 1907 (winners), 1909 (winners), 1910 (winners), 1912 (tie), 1913 (winners)
- France vs Great Britain (representing Great Britain): 1908 (winners)
- Coronation Match (representing the Professionals): 1911 (winners)
- Great Britain vs USA (representing Great Britain): 1921 (winners)
- Seniors vs Juniors (representing the Seniors): 1928 (winners)
- Ryder Cup (representing Great Britain): 1933 (non-playing captain, winners)

== Writings ==
- Taylor on Golf: Impressions, Comments and Hints, by J.H. Taylor, London, Hutchinson & Co., 1902.
- Golf: My Life's Work, by J.H. Taylor, London, 1953.

== See also ==
- List of men's major championships winning golfers
- List of golfers with most wins in one PGA Tour event
