= List of The Open Championship champions =

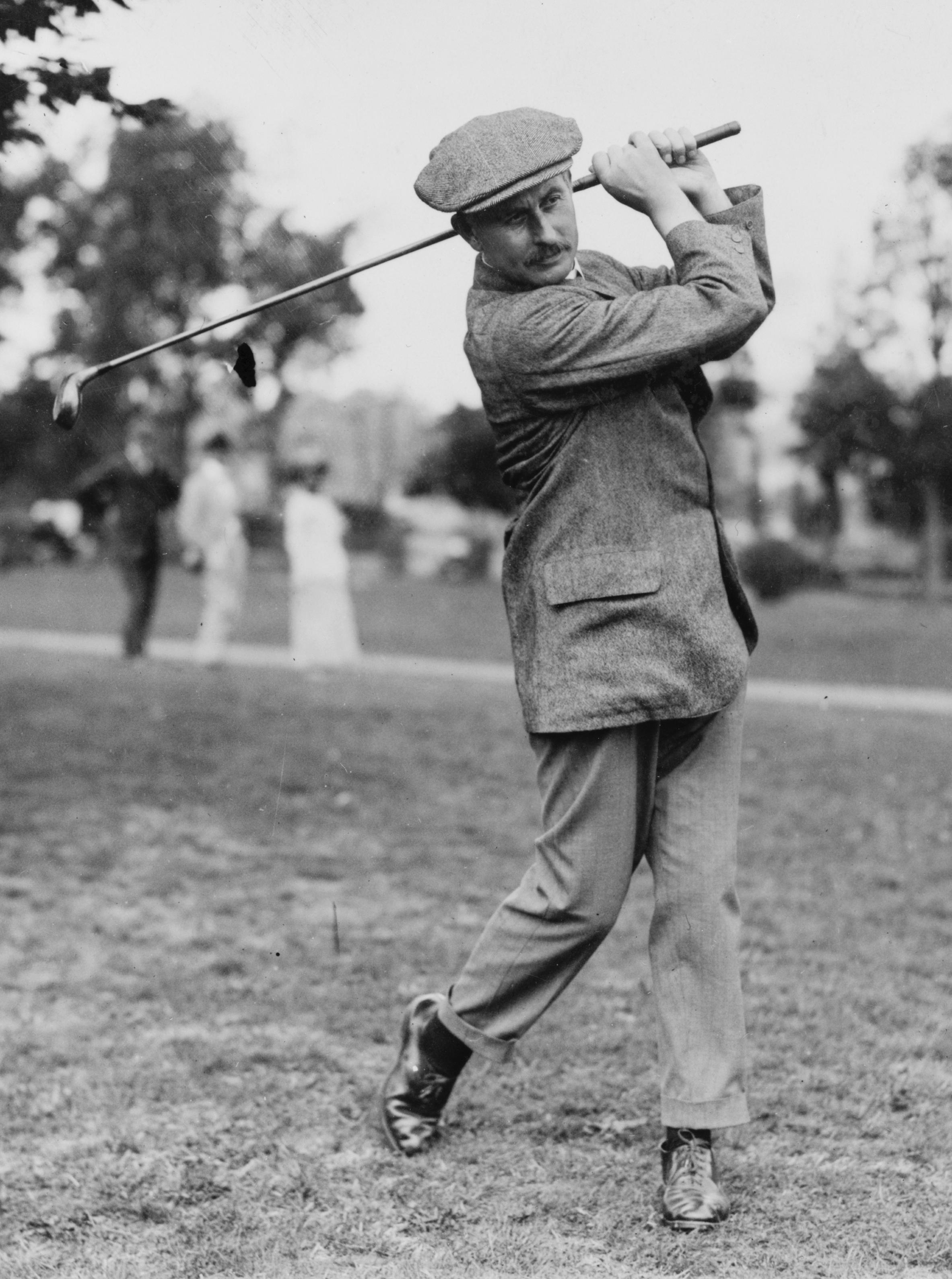
Harry Vardon, six-time Open Champion in 1896, 1898, 1899, 1903, 1911, and 1914, which is a record

The Open Championship is an annual golf competition held in the United Kingdom that was established in 1860. It is played on the weekend of the third Friday in July, and is the last of the four major championships to be played each year. In addition, this championship is conducted by The Royal and Ancient Golf Club of St Andrews (R&A). The championship was not held in 1871 due to a disagreement over a new trophy, from 1915 to 1919 and from 1940 to 1945 due to the First and Second World Wars respectively, and in 2020 due to the COVID-19 pandemic.

The reigning champion of the competition is automatically invited to play in the other three majors (Masters, the U.S. Open, and the PGA Championship) for the next five years. The prize of the tournament is the Golf Champion Trophy, commonly known as the Claret Jug, and the champion personally keeps the trophy until the next competition the following year. The champion also receives a gold medal, which they are allowed to keep permanently. Until 1870 the champion received the Challenge Belt, however when Tom Morris Jr. (more commonly known as Young Tom Morris) won the Open Championship three times in a row he won the belt outright, necessitating the need for a new trophy.

Harry Vardon holds the record for the most Open Championship victories, winning six times during his career. The oldest winner of the Open Championship is Tom Morris Sr. (or Old Tom Morris) who was 46 years and 102 days old when he won in 1867. His son, Tom Morris Jr., is the youngest winner of the championship, he was 17 years and 156 days old when he won the 1868 Open Championship. He also won the most consecutive times with four victories (1868–1872). Henrik Stenson and Cameron Smith hold the distinction of being both the most strokes under par for 72 holes (−20), (Note: 72 holes refers to four rounds of golf played on the same 18 holes of golf, with the pin positions varying from one round to another.) which they achieved in 2016 and 2022 respectively. Stenson also recorded the lowest total score (264) when he won in 2016. Scottie Scheffler is the current champion, winning the 2025 Open.

== Champions ==
Key
| (n/a) | Information not available |
| † | Tournament won in a playoff |
| * | Tournament won by an amateur |

=== By year ===
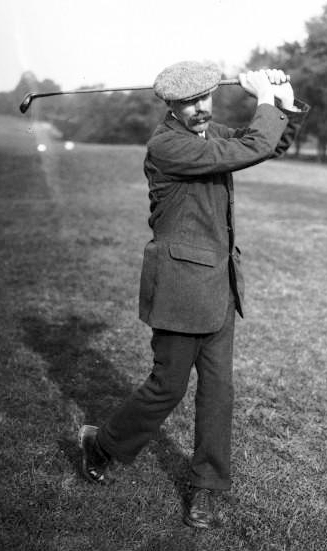
James Braid, five-time Open Champion in 1901, 1905, 1906, 1908, and 1910

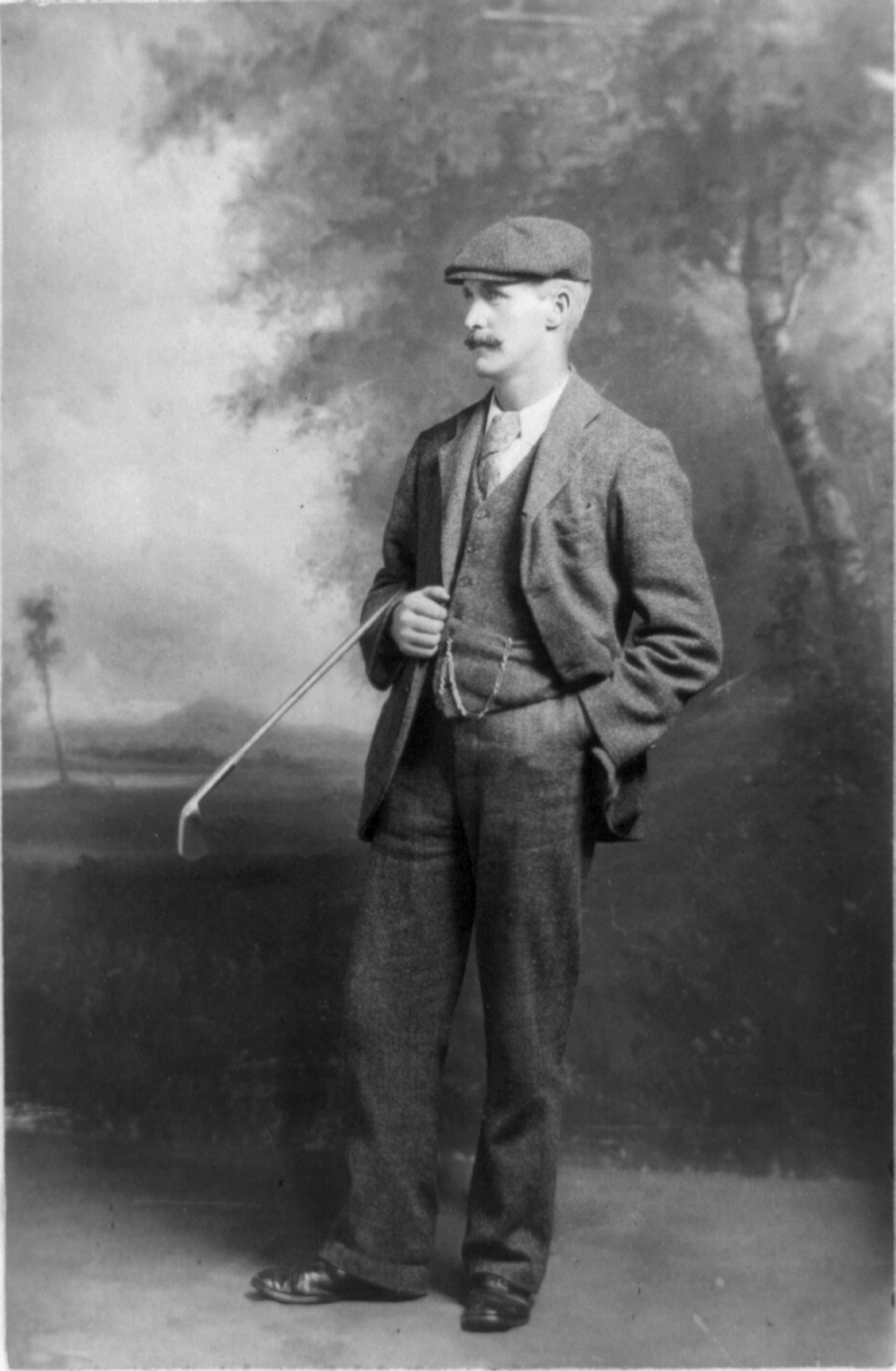
John Henry Taylor, five-time Open Champion in 1894, 1895, 1900, 1909, 1913

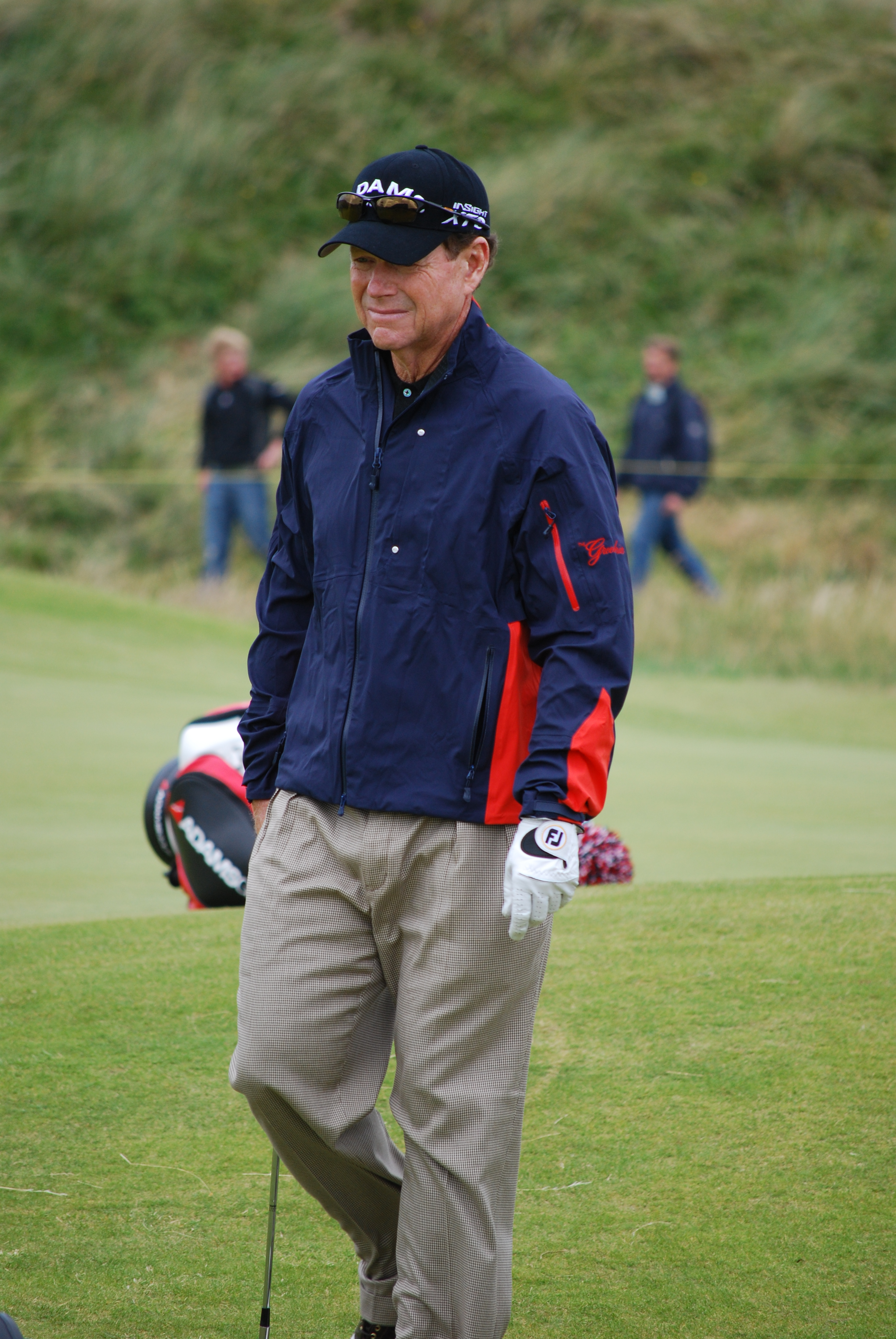
Tom Watson, five-time Open Champion in 1975, 1977, 1980, 1982, 1983

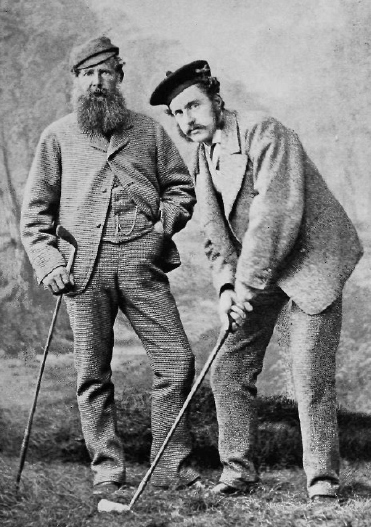
Tom Morris Sr., four-time Open Champion in 1861, 1862, 1864, and 1867. Tom Morris Jr., four-time Open Champion in 1868, 1869, 1870, and 1872.

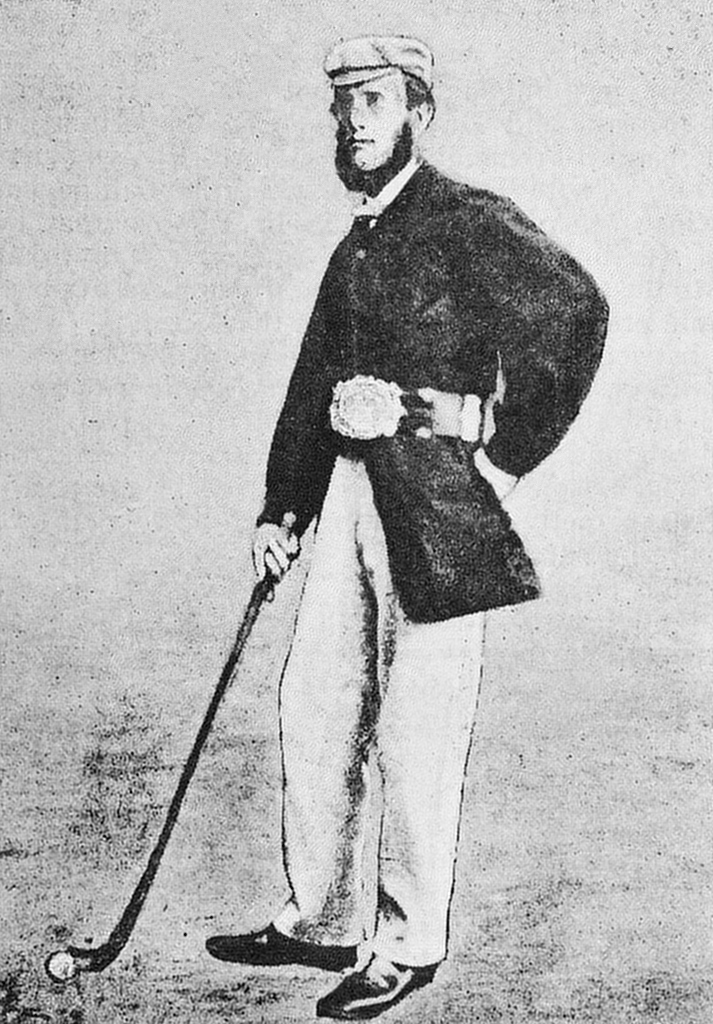
Willie Park Sr., four-time Open Champion in 1860, 1863, 1866, and 1875

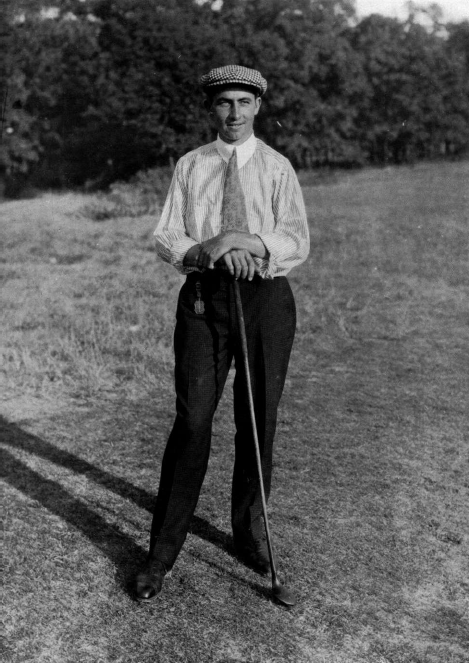
Walter Hagen, four-time Open Champion in 1922, 1924, 1928, and 1929

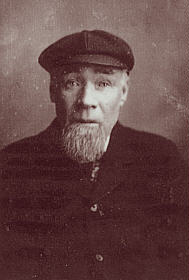
Bob Ferguson, three-time Open Champion in 1880, 1881, 1882

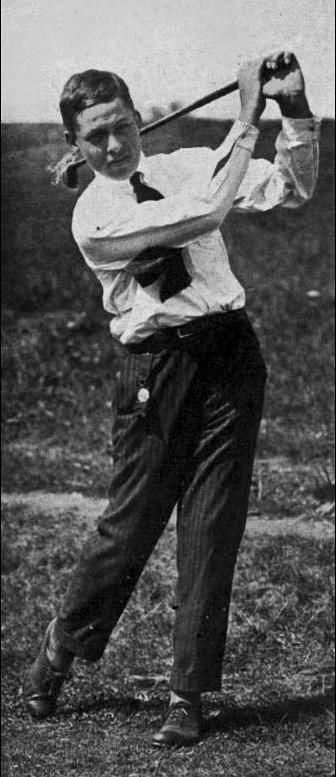
Bobby Jones, three-time Open Champion in 1926, 1927, and 1930. He is one of six champions to win wire-to-wire after 72-holes played with his victory in 1927.

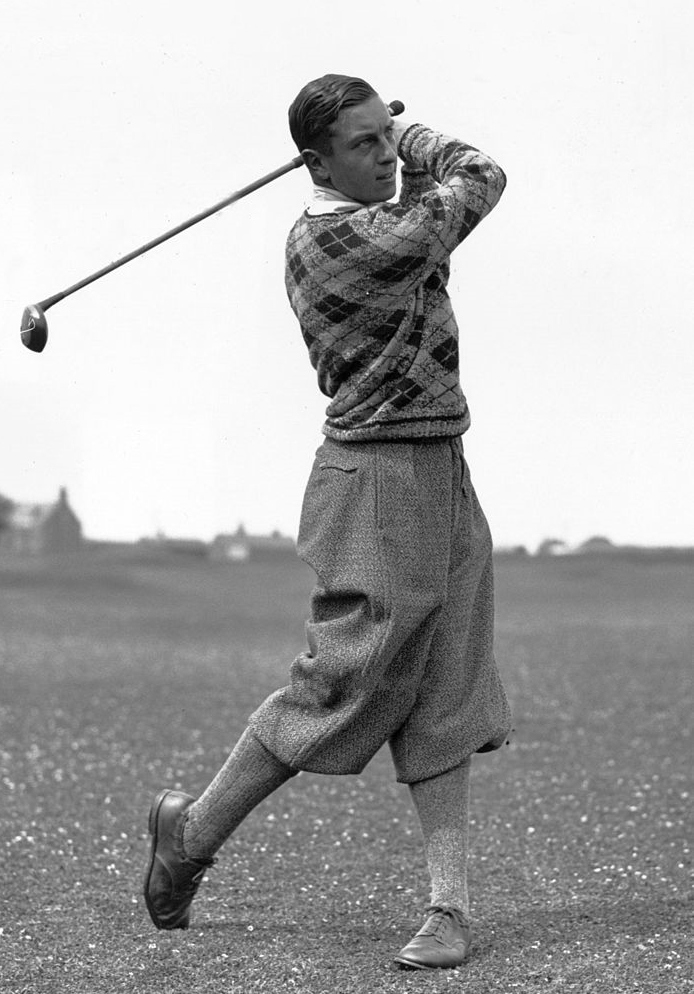
Henry Cotton, three-time Open Champion in 1934, 1937, and 1948. He is one of six champions to win wire-to-wire after 72-holes played with his victory in 1934.

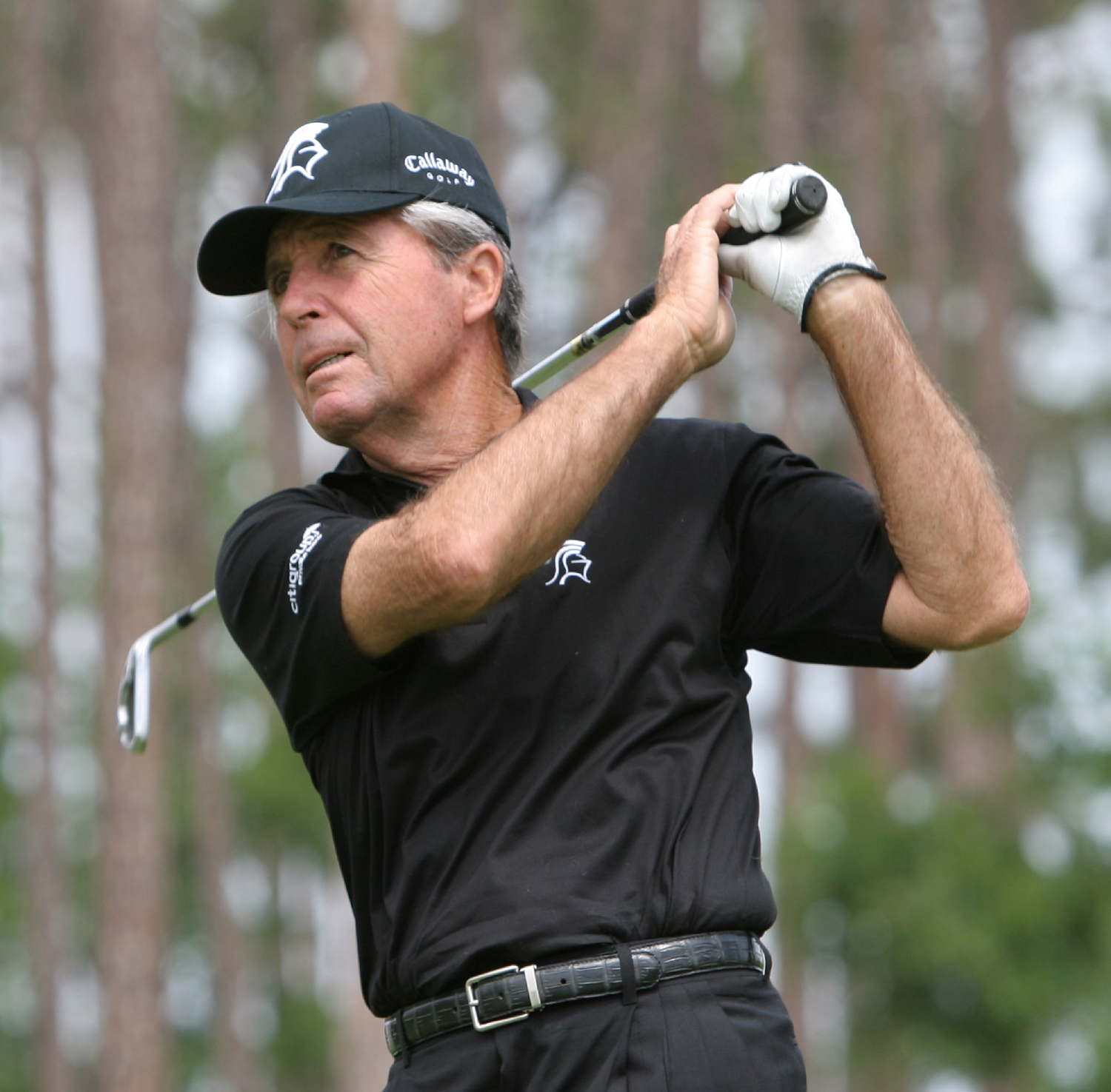
Gary Player, three-time Open Champion in 1959, 1968, and 1974.

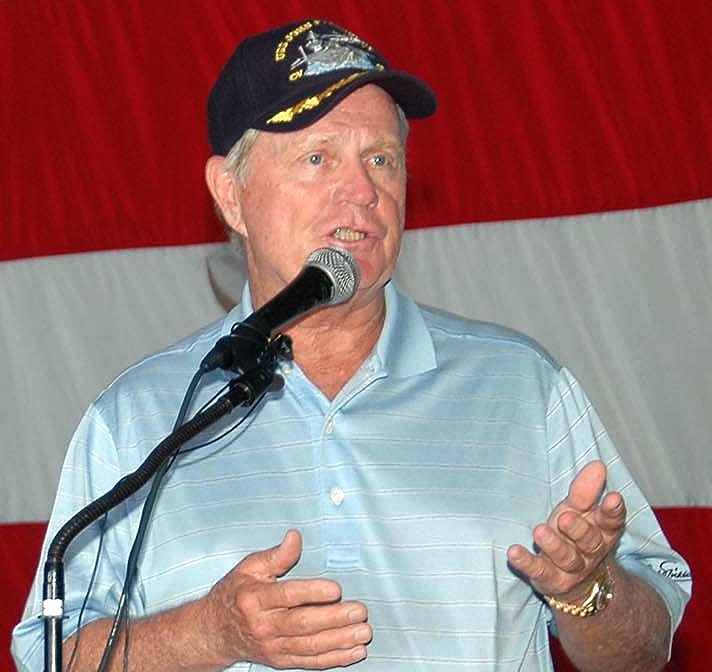
Jack Nicklaus, three-time Open Champion in 1966, 1970, and 1978

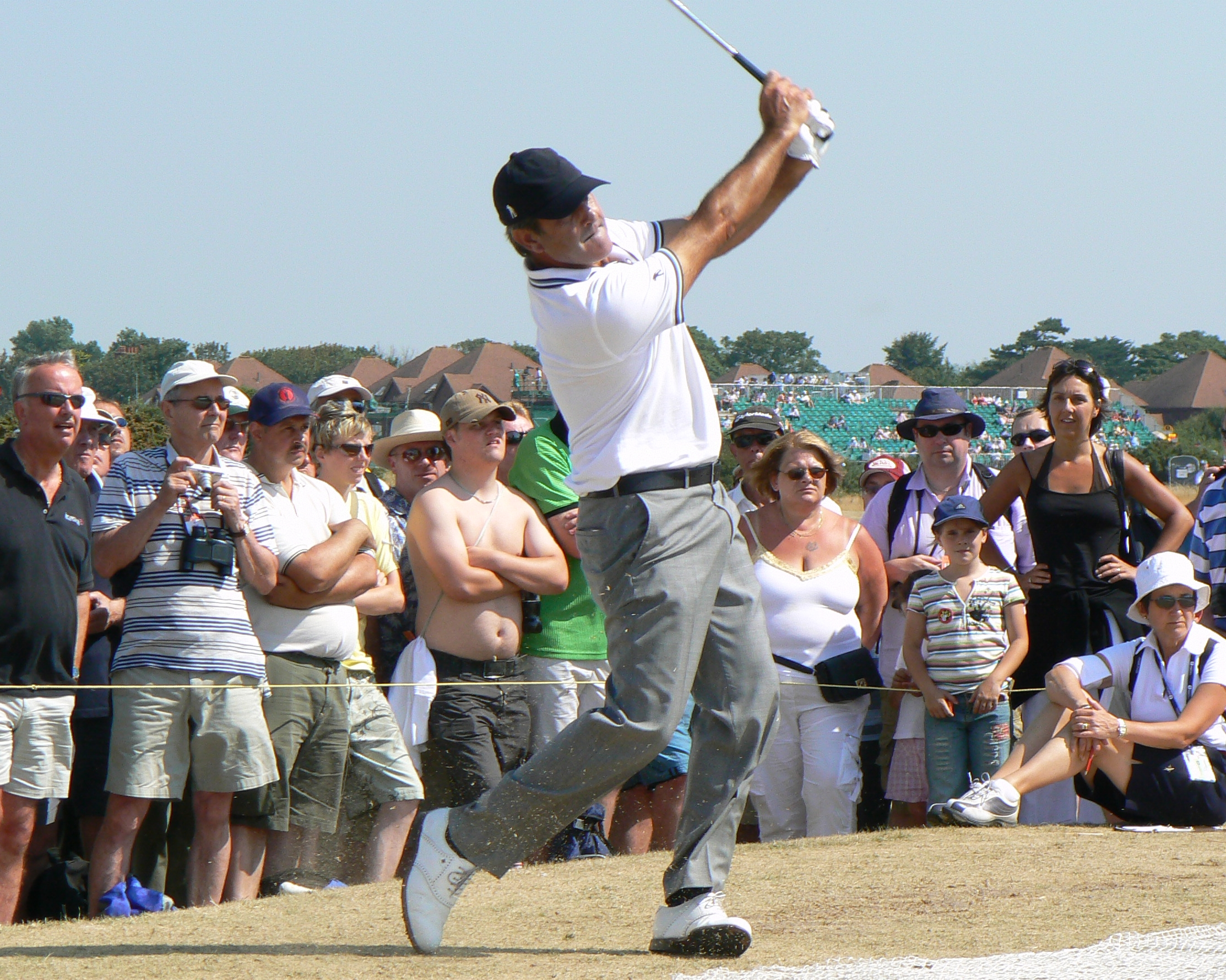
Seve Ballesteros, three-time Open Champion in 1979, 1984, and 1988

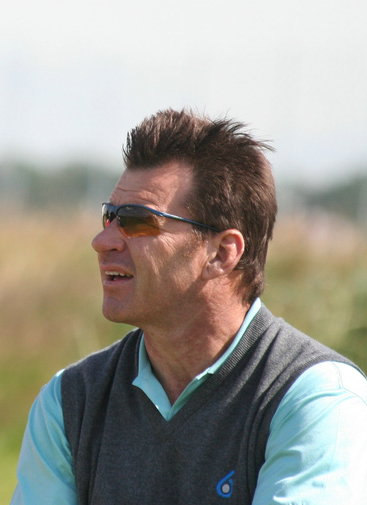
Nick Faldo, three-time Open Champion in 1987, 1990, and 1992

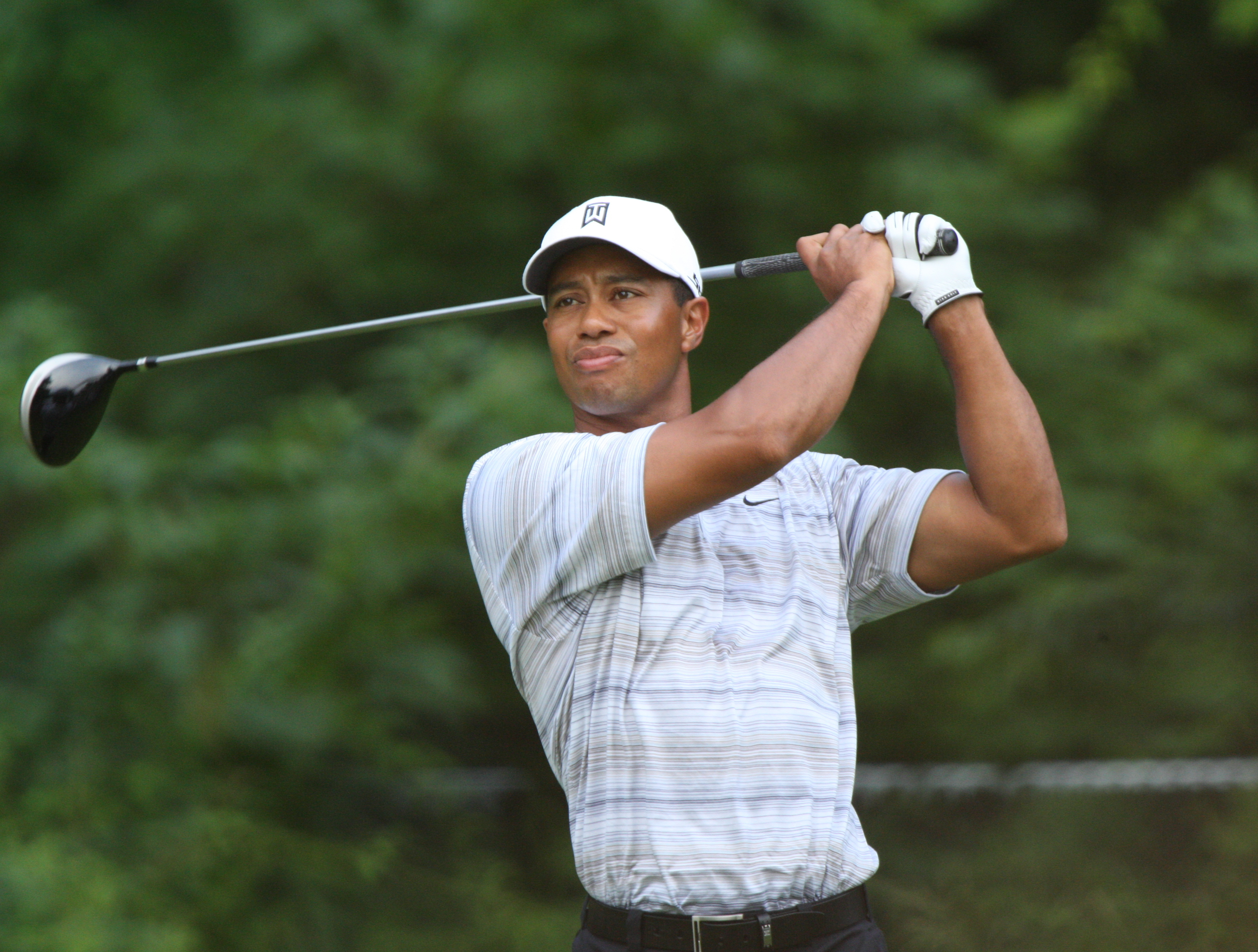
Tiger Woods, three-time Open Champion in 2000, 2005, and 2006. He is one of six champions to win wire-to-wire after 72-holes played with his victory in 2005.

The Open Championship champions
| Year | Country | Champion | Course | Location | Total score | To par (Note: Par is a predetermined number of strokes that a golfer should require to complete a hole, a round (the sum of the total pars of the played holes), or a tournament (the sum of the total pars of each round). E stands for even, which means the tournament was completed in the predetermined number of strokes.) |
|---|---|---|---|---|---|---|
| 1860 | Scotland | Willie Park Sr. | Prestwick Golf Club | Prestwick, Scotland | 174 | n/a |
| 1861 | Scotland | Tom Morris Sr. | Prestwick Golf Club | Prestwick, Scotland | 163 | n/a |
| 1862 | Scotland | Tom Morris Sr. | Prestwick Golf Club | Prestwick, Scotland | 163 | n/a |
| 1863 | Scotland | Willie Park Sr. | Prestwick Golf Club | Prestwick, Scotland | 168 | n/a |
| 1864 | Scotland | Tom Morris Sr. | Prestwick Golf Club | Prestwick, Scotland | 167 | n/a |
| 1865 | Scotland | Andrew Strath | Prestwick Golf Club | Prestwick, Scotland | 162 | n/a |
| 1866 | Scotland | Willie Park Sr. | Prestwick Golf Club | Prestwick, Scotland | 169 | n/a |
| 1867 | Scotland | Tom Morris Sr. | Prestwick Golf Club | Prestwick, Scotland | 170 | n/a |
| 1868 | Scotland | Tom Morris Jr. | Prestwick Golf Club | Prestwick, Scotland | 154 | n/a |
| 1869 | Scotland | Tom Morris Jr. | Prestwick Golf Club | Prestwick, Scotland | 157 | n/a |
| 1870 | Scotland | Tom Morris Jr. | Prestwick Golf Club | Prestwick, Scotland | 149 | n/a |
| 1871 | — | None (Note: The 1871 Open Championship was not held.) | — | — | — | — |
| 1872 | Scotland | Tom Morris Jr. | Prestwick Golf Club | Prestwick, Scotland | 166 | n/a |
| 1873 | Scotland | Tom Kidd | St Andrews | St Andrews, Scotland | 179 | n/a |
| 1874 | Scotland | Mungo Park | Musselburgh Links | Musselburgh, Scotland | 159 | n/a |
| 1875 | Scotland | Willie Park Sr. | Prestwick Golf Club | Prestwick, Scotland | 166 | n/a |
| 1876 | Scotland | Bob Martin^{†} (Note: Bob Martin won in a playoff against Davie Strath who refused to compete.) | St Andrews | St Andrews, Scotland | 176 | n/a |
| 1877 | Scotland | Jamie Anderson | Musselburgh Links | Musselburgh, Scotland | 160 | n/a |
| 1878 | Scotland | Jamie Anderson | Prestwick Golf Club | Prestwick, Scotland | 157 | n/a |
| 1879 | Scotland | Jamie Anderson | St Andrews | St Andrews, Scotland | 169 | n/a |
| 1880 | Scotland | Bob Ferguson | Musselburgh Links | Musselburgh, Scotland | 162 | n/a |
| 1881 | Scotland | Bob Ferguson | Prestwick Golf Club | Prestwick, Scotland | 170 | n/a |
| 1882 | Scotland | Bob Ferguson | St Andrews | St Andrews, Scotland | 171 | n/a |
| 1883 | Scotland | Willie Fernie^{†} (Note: Willie Fernie won in a playoff against Bob Ferguson.) | Musselburgh Links | Musselburgh, Scotland | 159 | n/a |
| 1884 | Scotland | Jack Simpson | Prestwick Golf Club | Prestwick, Scotland | 160 | n/a |
| 1885 | Scotland | Bob Martin | St Andrews | St Andrews, Scotland | 171 | n/a |
| 1886 | Scotland | David Brown | Musselburgh Links | Musselburgh, Scotland | 157 | n/a |
| 1887 | Scotland | Willie Park Jr. | Prestwick Golf Club | Prestwick, Scotland | 161 | n/a |
| 1888 | Scotland | Jack Burns | St Andrews | St Andrews, Scotland | 171 | n/a |
| 1889 | Scotland | Willie Park Jr.^{†} (Note: Willie Park Jr. won in a playoff against Andrew Kirkaldy.) | Musselburgh Links | Musselburgh, Scotland | 155 | n/a |
| 1890 | England | John Ball* (Note: John Ball won The Open Championship as an amateur.) | Prestwick Golf Club | Prestwick, Scotland | 162 | n/a |
| 1891 | Scotland | Hugh Kirkaldy | St Andrews | St Andrews, Scotland | 166 | n/a |
| 1892 | England | Harold Hilton* (Note: Harold Hilton won The Open Championship as an amateur.) | Muirfield | Gullane, Scotland | 305 | n/a |
| 1893 | Scotland | William Auchterlonie | Prestwick Golf Club | Prestwick, Scotland | 322 | n/a |
| 1894 | England | John Henry Taylor | Royal St George's | Sandwich, England | 326 | n/a |
| 1895 | England | John Henry Taylor | St Andrews | St Andrews, Scotland | 332 | n/a |
| 1896 | Jersey | Harry Vardon^{†} (Note: Harry Vardon won in a playoff against John Henry Taylor.) | Muirfield | Gullane, Scotland | 316 | n/a |
| 1897 | England | Harold Hilton* | Royal Liverpool | Hoylake, England | 314 | n/a |
| 1898 | Jersey | Harry Vardon | Prestwick Golf Club | Prestwick, Scotland | 307 | n/a |
| 1899 | Jersey | Harry Vardon | Royal St George's | Sandwich, England | 310 | n/a |
| 1900 | England | John Henry Taylor | St Andrews | St Andrews, Scotland | 309 | n/a |
| 1901 | Scotland | James Braid | Muirfield | Gullane, Scotland | 309 | n/a |
| 1902 | Scotland | Sandy Herd | Royal Liverpool | Hoylake, England | 307 | n/a |
| 1903 | Jersey | Harry Vardon | Prestwick Golf Club | Prestwick, Scotland | 300 | n/a |
| 1904 | Scotland | Jack White | Royal St George's | Sandwich, England | 296 | n/a |
| 1905 | Scotland | James Braid | St Andrews | St Andrews, Scotland | 318 | n/a |
| 1906 | Scotland | James Braid | Muirfield | Gullane, Scotland | 300 | n/a |
| 1907 | France | Arnaud Massy | Royal Liverpool | Hoylake, England | 312 | n/a |
| 1908 | Scotland | James Braid | Prestwick Golf Club | Prestwick, Scotland | 291 | n/a |
| 1909 | England | John Henry Taylor | Royal Cinque Ports | Deal, England | 291 | n/a |
| 1910 | Scotland | James Braid | St Andrews | St Andrews, Scotland | 299 | n/a |
| 1911 | Jersey | Harry Vardon^{†} (Note: Harry Vardon won in a playoff against Arnaud Massy.) | Royal St George's | Sandwich, England | 303 | n/a |
| 1912 | Jersey | Ted Ray | Muirfield | Gullane, Scotland | 295 | n/a |
| 1913 | England | John Henry Taylor | Royal Liverpool | Hoylake, England | 304 | n/a |
| 1914 | Jersey | Harry Vardon | Prestwick Golf Club | Prestwick, Scotland | 306 | n/a |
| 1915 | — | None (Note: The Open Championship was not held from 1915 to 1918 because of the First World War.) | — | — | — | — |
| 1916 | — | None | — | — | — | — |
| 1917 | — | None | — | — | — | — |
| 1918 | — | None | — | — | — | — |
| 1919 | — | None | — | — | — | — |
| 1920 | Scotland | George Duncan | Royal Cinque Ports | Deal, England | 303 | +15 |
| 1921 | United States | Jock Hutchison^{†} (Note: Jock Hutchison won in a playoff against Roger Wethered.) | St Andrews | St Andrews, Scotland | 296 | +8 |
| 1922 | United States | Walter Hagen | Royal St George's | Sandwich, England | 300 | +20 |
| 1923 | England | Arthur Havers | Troon | Troon, Scotland | 295 | +7 |
| 1924 | United States | Walter Hagen | Royal Liverpool | Hoylake, England | 301 | +13 |
| 1925 | England | Jim Barnes | Prestwick Golf Club | Prestwick, Scotland | 300 | +16 |
| 1926 | United States | Bobby Jones* (Note: Bobby Jones won The Open Championship as an amateur.) | Royal Lytham & St Annes | Lytham St Annes, England | 291 | +7 |
| 1927 | United States | Bobby Jones* | St Andrews | St Andrews, Scotland | 285 | –3 |
| 1928 | United States | Walter Hagen | Royal St George's | Sandwich, England | 292 | +12 |
| 1929 | United States | Walter Hagen | Muirfield | Gullane, Scotland | 292 | +8 |
| 1930 | United States | Bobby Jones* | Royal Liverpool | Hoylake, England | 291 | +3 |
| 1931 | United States | Tommy Armour | Carnoustie | Carnoustie, Scotland | 296 | +12 |
| 1932 | United States | Gene Sarazen | Prince's Golf Club | Sandwich, England | 283 | −5 |
| 1933 | United States | Denny Shute^{†} (Note: Denny Shute won in a playoff against Craig Wood.) | St Andrews | St Andrews, Scotland | 292 | +4 |
| 1934 | England | Henry Cotton | Royal St George's | Sandwich, England | 283 | +3 |
| 1935 | England | Alf Perry | Muirfield | Gullane, Scotland | 283 | −5 |
| 1936 | England | Alf Padgham | Royal Liverpool | Hoylake, England | 287 | −9 |
| 1937 | England | Henry Cotton | Carnoustie | Carnoustie, Scotland | 290 | +6 |
| 1938 | England | Reg Whitcombe | Royal St George's | Sandwich, England | 295 | +15 |
| 1939 | England | Dick Burton | St Andrews | St Andrews, Scotland | 290 | −2 |
| 1940 | — | None (Note: The Open Championship was not held from 1940 to 1945 because of the Second World War.) | — | — | — | — |
| 1941 | — | None | — | — | — | — |
| 1942 | — | None | — | — | — | — |
| 1943 | — | None | — | — | — | — |
| 1944 | — | None | — | — | — | — |
| 1945 | — | None | — | — | — | — |
| 1946 | United States | Sam Snead | St Andrews | St Andrews, Scotland | 290 | +2 |
| 1947 | Northern Ireland | Fred Daly | Royal Liverpool | Hoylake, England | 293 | +5 |
| 1948 | England | Henry Cotton | Muirfield | Gullane, Scotland | 284 | E |
| 1949 | South Africa | Bobby Locke^{†} (Note: Bobby Locke won in a playoff against Harry Bradshaw.) | Royal St George's | Sandwich, England | 283 | –5 |
| 1950 | South Africa | Bobby Locke | Troon | Troon, Scotland | 279 | −9 |
| 1951 | England | Max Faulkner | Royal Portrush | County Antrim, Northern Ireland | 285 | −3 |
| 1952 | South Africa | Bobby Locke | Royal Lytham & St Annes | Lytham St Annes, England | 287 | –1 |
| 1953 | United States | Ben Hogan | Carnoustie | Carnoustie, Scotland | 282 | −6 |
| 1954 | Australia | Peter Thomson | Royal Birkdale | Southport, England | 283 | −3 |
| 1955 | Australia | Peter Thomson | St Andrews | St Andrews, Scotland | 281 | −7 |
| 1956 | Australia | Peter Thomson | Royal Liverpool | Hoylake, England | 286 | −2 |
| 1957 | South Africa | Bobby Locke | St Andrews | St Andrews, Scotland | 279 | −9 |
| 1958 | Australia | Peter Thomson^{†} (Note: Peter Thomson won in a playoff against Dave Thomas.) | Royal Lytham & St Annes | Lytham St Annes, England | 274 | −10 |
| 1959 | South Africa | Gary Player | Muirfield | Gullane, Scotland | 284 | E |
| 1960 | Australia | Kel Nagle | St Andrews | St Andrews, Scotland | 278 | −10 |
| 1961 | United States | Arnold Palmer | Royal Birkdale | Southport, England | 284 | −4 |
| 1962 | United States | Arnold Palmer | Troon | Troon, Scotland | 276 | −12 |
| 1963 | New Zealand | Bob Charles^{†} (Note: Bob Charles won in a playoff against Phil Rodgers.) | Royal Lytham & St Annes | Lytham St Annes, England | 277 | −7 |
| 1964 | United States | Tony Lema | St Andrews | St Andrews, Scotland | 279 | −9 |
| 1965 | Australia | Peter Thomson | Royal Birkdale | Southport, England | 285 | −7 |
| 1966 | United States | Jack Nicklaus | Muirfield | Gullane, Scotland | 282 | −2 |
| 1967 | Argentina | Roberto De Vicenzo | Royal Liverpool | Hoylake, England | 278 | −10 |
| 1968 | South Africa | Gary Player | Carnoustie | Carnoustie, Scotland | 289 | +1 |
| 1969 | England | Tony Jacklin | Royal Lytham & St Annes | Lytham St Annes, England | 280 | −4 |
| 1970 | United States | Jack Nicklaus^{†} (Note: Jack Nicklaus won in a playoff against Doug Sanders.) | St Andrews | St Andrews, Scotland | 283 | −5 |
| 1971 | United States | Lee Trevino | Royal Birkdale | Southport, England | 278 | −14 |
| 1972 | United States | Lee Trevino | Muirfield | Gullane, Scotland | 278 | −6 |
| 1973 | United States | Tom Weiskopf | Royal Troon | Troon, Scotland | 276 | −12 |
| 1974 | South Africa | Gary Player | Royal Lytham & St Annes | Lytham St Annes, England | 282 | −2 |
| 1975 | United States | Tom Watson^{†} (Note: Tom Watson won in a playoff against Jack Newton.) | Carnoustie | Carnoustie, Scotland | 279 | −9 |
| 1976 | United States | Johnny Miller | Royal Birkdale | Southport, England | 279 | −9 |
| 1977 | United States | Tom Watson | Turnberry | South Ayrshire, Scotland | 268 | −12 |
| 1978 | United States | Jack Nicklaus | St Andrews | St Andrews, Scotland | 281 | −7 |
| 1979 | Spain | Seve Ballesteros | Royal Lytham & St Annes | Lytham St Annes, England | 283 | −1 |
| 1980 | United States | Tom Watson | Muirfield | Gullane, Scotland | 271 | −13 |
| 1981 | United States | Bill Rogers | Royal St George's | Sandwich, England | 276 | −4 |
| 1982 | United States | Tom Watson | Royal Troon | Troon, Scotland | 284 | −4 |
| 1983 | United States | Tom Watson | Royal Birkdale | Southport, England | 275 | −9 |
| 1984 | Spain | Seve Ballesteros | St Andrews | St Andrews, Scotland | 276 | −12 |
| 1985 | Scotland | Sandy Lyle | Royal St George's | Sandwich, England | 282 | +2 |
| 1986 | Australia | Greg Norman | Turnberry | South Ayrshire, Scotland | 280 | E |
| 1987 | England | Nick Faldo | Muirfield | Gullane, Scotland | 279 | −5 |
| 1988 | Spain | Seve Ballesteros | Royal Lytham & St Annes | Lytham St Annes, England | 273 | −11 |
| 1989 | United States | Mark Calcavecchia^{†} (Note: Mark Calcavecchia won in a playoff against Wayne Grady and Greg Norman.) | Royal Troon | Troon, Scotland | 275 | −13 |
| 1990 | England | Nick Faldo | St Andrews | St Andrews, Scotland | 270 | −18 |
| 1991 | Australia | Ian Baker-Finch | Royal Birkdale | Southport, England | 272 | −8 |
| 1992 | England | Nick Faldo | Muirfield | Gullane, Scotland | 272 | −12 |
| 1993 | Australia | Greg Norman | Royal St George's | Sandwich, England | 267 | −13 |
| 1994 | Zimbabwe | Nick Price | Turnberry | South Ayrshire, Scotland | 268 | −12 |
| 1995 | United States | John Daly^{†} (Note: John Daly won in a playoff against Costantino Rocca.) | St Andrews | St Andrews, Scotland | 282 | −6 |
| 1996 | United States | Tom Lehman | Royal Lytham & St Annes | Lytham St Annes, England | 271 | −13 |
| 1997 | United States | Justin Leonard | Royal Troon | Troon, Scotland | 272 | −12 |
| 1998 | United States | Mark O'Meara^{†} (Note: Mark O'Meara won in a playoff against Brian Watts.) | Royal Birkdale | Southport, England | 280 | E |
| 1999 | Scotland | Paul Lawrie^{†} (Note: Paul Lawrie won in a playoff against Jean van de Velde and Justin Leonard.) | Carnoustie | Carnoustie, Scotland | 290 | +6 |
| 2000 | United States | Tiger Woods | St Andrews | St Andrews, Scotland | 269 | −19 |
| 2001 | United States | David Duval | Royal Lytham & St Annes | Lytham St Annes, England | 274 | −10 |
| 2002 | South Africa | Ernie Els^{†} (Note: Ernie Els won in a playoff against Thomas Levet, Steve Elkington and Stuart Appleby.) | Muirfield | Gullane, Scotland | 278 | −6 |
| 2003 | United States | Ben Curtis | Royal St George's | Sandwich, England | 283 | −1 |
| 2004 | United States | Todd Hamilton^{†} (Note: Todd Hamilton won in a playoff against Ernie Els.) | Royal Troon | Troon, Scotland | 274 | −10 |
| 2005 | United States | Tiger Woods | St Andrews | St Andrews, Scotland | 274 | −14 |
| 2006 | United States | Tiger Woods | Royal Liverpool | Hoylake, England | 270 | −18 |
| 2007 | Ireland | Pádraig Harrington^{†} (Note: Pádraig Harrington won in a playoff against Sergio García.) | Carnoustie | Carnoustie, Scotland | 277 | −7 |
| 2008 | Ireland | Pádraig Harrington | Royal Birkdale | Southport, England | 283 | +3 |
| 2009 | United States | Stewart Cink^{†} (Note: Stewart Cink won in a playoff against Tom Watson.) | Turnberry | South Ayrshire, Scotland | 278 | −2 |
| 2010 | South Africa | Louis Oosthuizen | St Andrews | St Andrews, Scotland | 272 | −16 |
| 2011 | Northern Ireland | Darren Clarke | Royal St George's | Sandwich, England | 275 | −5 |
| 2012 | South Africa | Ernie Els | Royal Lytham & St Annes | Lytham St Annes, England | 273 | −7 |
| 2013 | United States | Phil Mickelson | Muirfield | Gullane, Scotland | 281 | −3 |
| 2014 | Northern Ireland | Rory McIlroy | Royal Liverpool | Hoylake, England | 271 | −17 |
| 2015 | United States | Zach Johnson^{†} (Note: Zach Johnson won in a playoff against Marc Leishman and Louis Oosthuizen.) | St Andrews | St Andrews, Scotland | 273 | −15 |
| 2016 | Sweden | Henrik Stenson | Royal Troon | Troon, Scotland | 264 | −20 |
| 2017 | United States | Jordan Spieth | Royal Birkdale | Southport, England | 268 | −12 |
| 2018 | Italy | Francesco Molinari | Carnoustie | Carnoustie, Scotland | 276 | −8 |
| 2019 | Ireland | Shane Lowry | Royal Portrush | County Antrim, Northern Ireland | 269 | −15 |
| 2020 | — | None (Note: The Open Championship was not held in 2020 due to the COVID-19 pandemic in the United Kingdom.) | — | — | — | — |
| 2021 | United States | Collin Morikawa | Royal St George's | Sandwich, England | 265 | −15 |
| 2022 | Australia | Cameron Smith | St Andrews | St Andrews, Scotland | 268 | −20 |
| 2023 | United States | Brian Harman | Royal Liverpool | Hoylake, England | 271 | −13 |
| 2024 | United States | Xander Schauffele | Royal Troon | Troon, Scotland | 275 | −9 |
| 2025 | United States | Scottie Scheffler | Royal Portrush | County Antrim, Northern Ireland | 267 | −17 |
| 2026 | New Zealand | Ryan Fox | Royal Birkdale | Southport, England | 270 | −10 |

=== Multiple champions ===
Multiple Open championship champions
| Golfer | Total | Years |
|---|---|---|
| Harry Vardon (JEY) | 6 | 1896, 1898, 1899, 1903, 1911, 1914 |
| James Braid (SCO) | 5 | 1901, 1905, 1906, 1908, 1910 |
| John Henry Taylor (ENG) | 5 | 1894, 1895, 1900, 1909, 1913 |
| Peter Thomson (AUS) | 5 | 1954, 1955, 1956, 1958, 1965 |
| Tom Watson (USA) | 5 | 1975, 1977, 1980, 1982, 1983 |
| Tom Morris Sr. (SCO) | 4 | 1861, 1862, 1864, 1867 |
| Tom Morris Jr. (SCO) | 4 | 1868, 1869, 1870, 1872 |
| Willie Park Sr. (SCO) | 4 | 1860, 1863, 1866, 1875 |
| Walter Hagen (USA) | 4 | 1922, 1924, 1928, 1929 |
| Bobby Locke (RSA) | 4 | 1949, 1950, 1952, 1957 |
| Jamie Anderson (SCO) | 3 | 1877, 1878, 1879 |
| Bob Ferguson (SCO) | 3 | 1880, 1881, 1882 |
| Bobby Jones (a) (USA) | 3 | 1926, 1927, 1930 |
| Henry Cotton (ENG) | 3 | 1934, 1937, 1948 |
| Gary Player (RSA) | 3 | 1959, 1968, 1974 |
| Jack Nicklaus (USA) | 3 | 1966, 1970, 1978 |
| Seve Ballesteros (ESP) | 3 | 1979, 1984, 1988 |
| Nick Faldo (ENG) | 3 | 1987, 1990, 1992 |
| Tiger Woods (USA) | 3 | 2000, 2005, 2006 |
| Bob Martin (SCO) | 2 | 1876, 1885 |
| Willie Park Jr. (SCO) | 2 | 1887, 1889 |
| Harold Hilton (a) (ENG) | 2 | 1892, 1897 |
| Arnold Palmer (USA) | 2 | 1961, 1962 |
| Lee Trevino (USA) | 2 | 1971, 1972 |
| Greg Norman (AUS) | 2 | 1986, 1993 |
| Pádraig Harrington (IRL) | 2 | 2007, 2008 |
| Ernie Els (RSA) | 2 | 2002, 2012 |

=== By nationality ===
Open Championship champions by nationality
| Nationality | Wins | Winners |
|---|---|---|
| United States | 48 | 33 |
| Scotland | 41 | 22 |
| England | 22 | 13 |
| Australia | 10 | 5 |
| South Africa | 10 | 4 |
| Jersey | 7 | 2 |
| Northern Ireland | 3 | 3 |
| Spain | 3 | 1 |
| Ireland | 3 | 2 |
| New Zealand | 2 | 2 |
| Argentina | 1 | 1 |
| France | 1 | 1 |
| Italy | 1 | 1 |
| Sweden | 1 | 1 |
| Zimbabwe | 1 | 1 |

== Bibliography ==
- Newport, Stuart (1997). Guinness Book Of Knowledge. Guinness Publishing. ISBN 0-85112-046-6.
