= 2017 Open Championship =

Tournament information
- Dates: 20–23 July 2017
- Location: Southport, England; 53.622°N 3.0333°W
- Course: Royal Birkdale Golf Club
- Organized by: The R&A
- Tours: European Tour; PGA Tour; Japan Golf Tour

Statistics
- Par: 70
- Length: 7,156 yards (6,543 m)
- Field: 156 players, 77 after cut
- Cut: 145 (+5)
- Prize fund: $10,250,000 €8,935,572 £7,890,000 (est.)
- Winner's share: $1,845,000 €1,608,403 £1,420,000 (est.)

Champion
- (United States) Jordan Spieth
- 268 (−12)

Location map
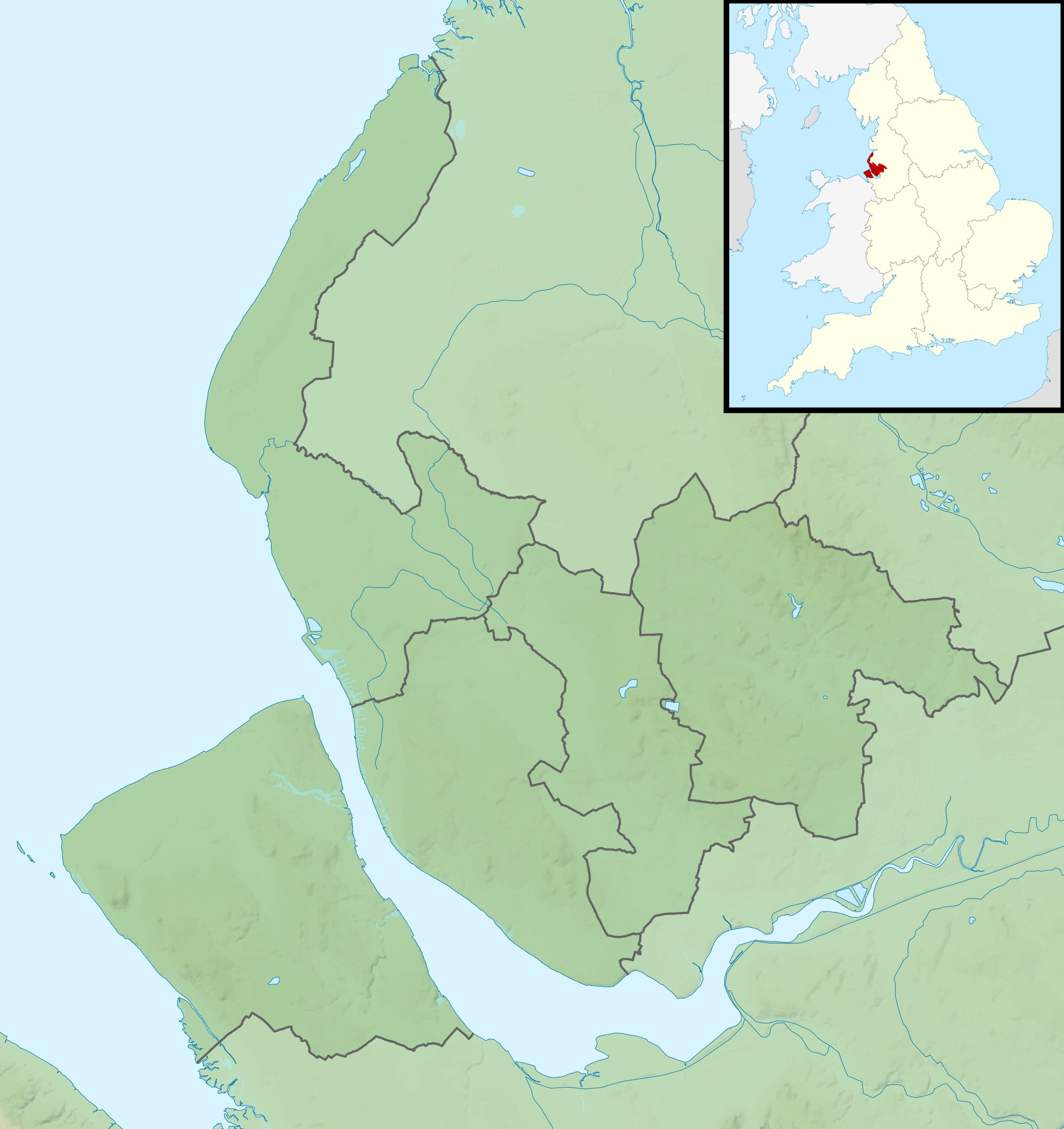
- Location in England Location in Southport, Merseyside, north of Liverpool, England

The 2017 Open Championship was a major golf championship and the 146th Open Championship, held 20–23 July at Royal Birkdale Golf Club in Southport, England. It was the tenth Open Championship at Royal Birkdale, which held its first in 1954.

Jordan Spieth shot four rounds in the sixties for 268 (−12), three strokes ahead of runner-up Matt Kuchar, for his third major title, and the second in which he led wire-to-wire (2015 Masters). In the third round, Branden Grace scored 62 to set a new major championship record.

This was the first year that the prize money was paid in U.S. dollars, rather than British pounds.

== Media ==
This was the second Open Championship televised domestically by Sky Sports. In the United States, it is the second Open Championship to be televised by NBC (Golf Channel's parent network).

== Venue ==
This was the tenth Open Championship at Royal Birkdale; the ninth in 2008 saw Pádraig Harrington successfully defend his 2007 title from Carnoustie.

=== Course layout ===
Hole	Yards	Par	Hole	Yards	Par
1	448	4	10	402	4
2	422	4	11	436	4
3	451	4	12	183	3
4	199	3	13	499	4
5	346	4	14	200	3
6	499	4	15	542	5
7	177	3	16	438	4
8	458	4	17	567	5
9	416	4	18	473	4
Out	3,416	34	In	3,740	36
Source:		Total		7,156	70

Lengths of the course for previous Opens:

- 2008: 7,173 yards (6,559 m), par 70
- 1998: 7,018 yards (6,417 m), par 70
- 1991: 6,940 yards (6,350 m), par 70
- 1983: 6,968 yards (6,372 m), par 71
- 1976: 7,001 yards (6,402 m), par 72
- 1971: 7,080 yards (6,470 m), par 73
- 1965: 7,037 yards (6,435 m), par 73
- 1961: 6,844 yards (6,258 m), par 72
- 1954: 6,867 yards (6,279 m), par 73

== Field ==
The Open Championship field was made up of 156 players, who gained entry through various exemption criteria and qualifying tournaments. The criteria included past Open champions, recent major winners, top ranked players in the world rankings and from the leading world tours, and winners and high finishers from various designated tournaments, including the Open Qualifying Series; the winners of designated amateur events, including The Amateur Championship and U.S. Amateur, also gained exemption provided they remain an amateur. Anyone not qualifying via exemption, and had a handicap of 0.4 or lower, could gain entry through regional and final qualifying events.

=== Criteria and exemptions ===
Each player is classified according to the first category in which he qualified, but other categories are shown in parentheses. (Note: (a) – indicates the player was an amateur.)

1. The Open Champions aged 60 or under on 23 July 2017

- Stewart Cink (2)
- Darren Clarke (2)
- John Daly
- David Duval
- Ernie Els (2)
- Todd Hamilton
- Pádraig Harrington (2)
- Zach Johnson (2,17)
- Paul Lawrie
- Tom Lehman
- Sandy Lyle
- Rory McIlroy (2,3,4,5,10,12,17)
- Phil Mickelson (2,3,4,12,17)
- Mark O'Meara
- Louis Oosthuizen (2,4,5)
- Henrik Stenson (2,3,4,5,17)
- Eligible but did not enter: Ian Baker-Finch, Mark Calcavecchia, Nick Faldo, (Note: Faldo and Price were in their final year of eligibility.) Justin Leonard, Nick Price, Tiger Woods.
- Ben Curtis withdrew before the tournament.

2. The Open Champions for 2007–2016

3. Top 10 finishers and ties in the 2016 Open Championship

- Sergio García (4,5,9,17)
- Bill Haas (4)
- Tyrrell Hatton (4,5)
- J. B. Holmes (4,12,17)
- Dustin Johnson (4,8,12,17)
- Andrew Johnston (5)
- Søren Kjeldsen (5)
- Steve Stricker

4. Top 50 players in the Official World Golf Ranking (OWGR) for Week 21, 2017

- Daniel Berger (12)
- Wesley Bryan
- Rafa Cabrera-Bello (5,17)
- Paul Casey (12)
- Kevin Chappell (12)
- Jason Day (10,11,12)
- Ross Fisher (5)
- Matt Fitzpatrick (5,17)
- Tommy Fleetwood
- Rickie Fowler (11,17)
- Branden Grace (5)
- Emiliano Grillo (12)
- Adam Hadwin
- Billy Horschel
- Kim Si-woo (11,12)
- Kevin Kisner (12)
- Russell Knox (12)
- Brooks Koepka (8,17)
- Matt Kuchar (12,17)
- Marc Leishman
- Hideki Matsuyama (12,21)
- William McGirt (12)
- Francesco Molinari (5)
- Ryan Moore (12,17)
- Alex Norén (5,6)
- Pat Perez
- Thomas Pieters (5,17)
- Jon Rahm
- Patrick Reed (12,17)
- Justin Rose (8,14,17)
- Charl Schwartzel (5,12)
- Adam Scott (9,12)
- Jordan Spieth (8,9,12,17)
- Hideto Tanihara (22)
- Justin Thomas (12)
- Jimmy Walker (10,12,17)
- Bubba Watson (9,12)
- Bernd Wiesberger (5)
- Danny Willett (5,9,17)
- Gary Woodland (12)
- Brandt Snedeker (12,17) did not play.

5. Top 30 on the 2016 Race to Dubai

- Richard Bland
- Scott Hend (18)
- David Horsey
- Thongchai Jaidee
- Martin Kaymer (8,17)
- Li Haotong
- Shane Lowry
- Joost Luiten
- Thorbjørn Olesen
- Andy Sullivan (17)
- Wang Jeung-hun
- Lee Westwood (17)
- Chris Wood (6,17)

6. Last three BMW PGA Championship winners

- An Byeong-hun

7. Top 5 players, not already exempt, within the top 20 of the 2017 Race to Dubai through the BMW International Open

- Dylan Frittelli
- Pablo Larrazábal
- Alexander Lévy
- David Lipsky
- Fabrizio Zanotti

8. Last five U.S. Open winners

9. Last five Masters Tournament winners

10. Last five PGA Championship winners

- Jason Dufner (12)

11. Last three Players Championship winners

12. The 30 qualifiers for the 2016 Tour Championship

- Roberto Castro
- Kevin Na
- Sean O'Hair
- Jhonattan Vegas

13. Top 5 players, not already exempt, within the top 20 of the 2017 FedEx Cup points list through the Travelers Championship

- Brian Harman
- Russell Henley
- Charley Hoffman
- Brendan Steele

14. Winner of the 2016 Olympic Golf Tournament

15. Winner of the 2016 Open de Argentina

- Kent Bulle

16. Winner and runner-up from the 2017 Korea Open

- Chang Yi-keun
- Kim Gi-whan

17. Playing members of the 2016 Ryder Cup teams

18. Winner of the 2016 Asian Tour Order of Merit

19. Winner of the 2016 PGA Tour of Australasia Order of Merit

- Matthew Griffin

20. Winner of the 2016–17 Sunshine Tour Order of Merit

- Brandon Stone

21. Winner of the 2016 Japan Open

22. Top 2 on the 2016 Japan Golf Tour Official Money List

- Yuta Ikeda

23. Top 2, not already exempt, on the 2017 Japan Golf Tour Official Money List through the Japan Golf Tour Championship

- Yūsaku Miyazato
- Shaun Norris

24. Winner of the 2016 Senior Open Championship

- Paul Broadhurst

25. Winner of the 2017 Amateur Championship

- Harry Ellis (a)

26. Winner of the 2016 U.S. Amateur

- Curtis Luck forfeited his exemption after turning professional in April 2017.

27. Winners of the 2016 and 2017 editions of the European Amateur

- Luca Cianchetti (a)
- Alfie Plant (a)

28. Recipient of the 2016 Mark H. McCormack Medal

- Maverick McNealy (a)

=== Open Qualifying Series ===
The Open Qualifying Series (OQS) consisted of 10 events from the six major tours. Places were available to the leading players (not otherwise exempt) who finished in the top n and ties. In the event of ties, positions went to players ranked highest according to that week's OWGR.

Location	Tournament	Date	Spots	Top	Qualifiers
Australia	Emirates Australian Open	20 Nov	3	10	Aaron Baddeley, Ashley Hall, Cameron Smith
Singapore	SMBC Singapore Open	22 Jan	4	12	Phachara Khongwatmai, Jbe' Kruger, Prayad Marksaeng, Song Young-han
South Africa	Joburg Open	26 Feb	3	10	Darren Fichardt, Stuart Manley, Paul Waring
Japan	Mizuno Open	28 May	4	12	Adam Bland, Michael Hendry, Chan Kim, Kim Kyung-tae
France	HNA Open de France	2 Jul	3	10	Alexander Björk, Mike Lorenzo-Vera, Peter Uihlein
United States	Quicken Loans National	2 Jul	4	12	Charles Howell III, Kang Sung-hoon, Martin Laird, Kyle Stanley
Ireland	Dubai Duty Free Irish Open	9 Jul	3	10	David Drysdale, Ryan Fox, Richie Ramsay
United States	Greenbrier Classic	9 Jul	4	12	Jamie Lovemark, Sebastián Muñoz, Xander Schauffele, Robert Streb
Scotland	Aberdeen Asset Management Scottish Open	16 Jul	3	10	Andrew Dodt, Matthieu Pavon, Callum Shinkwin
United States	John Deere Classic	16 Jul	1	5	Bryson DeChambeau

=== Final Qualifying ===
The Final Qualifying events were played on 4 July at five courses covering Scotland and the North-West, Central and South-coast regions of England. Three qualifying places were available at each location.

Location	Qualifiers (Note: (R) – indicates a golfer who came through Regional Qualifying.)
Gailes Links	Ryan McCarthy, Julian Suri, Connor Syme (a)
Hillside	Adam Hodkinson, Nick McCarthy, Haydn McCullen
Notts (Hollinwell)	Laurie Canter, Joe Dean, Mark Foster
Royal Cinque Ports	Austin Connelly, Robert Dinwiddie, Matthew Southgate
Woburn	Shiv Kapur, Ian Poulter, Toby Tree

=== Alternates ===
To make up the full field of 156, additional places were allocated in ranking order from the Official World Golf Ranking at the time that these places were made available by the Championship Committee.

From the Week 26 (week ending 2 July) Official World Golf Ranking:

- Webb Simpson (ranked 61)
- Anirban Lahiri (66) (Note: Scott Piercy, ranked 65, declined his place, which then went to Lahiri.)

From the Week 27 (week ending 9 July) Official World Golf Ranking:

- Tony Finau (64) (Note: Finau replaced Ben Curtis.)
- James Hahn (66) (Note: Hahn replaced Brandt Snedeker.)

== Round summaries ==
=== First round ===
Thursday, 20 July 2017

Three Americans – Brooks Koepka, Matt Kuchar, and Jordan Spieth – shared the lead after the first round on five under par, a shot clear of England's Paul Casey and Charl Schwartzel, with Ian Poulter a further shot back. Reigning champion Henrik Stenson was one under after a 69. Rory McIlroy was five over par after six holes but recovered to finish with a one-over-par 71.

Place	Player	Score	To par
T1	(United States) Brooks Koepka	65	−5
T1	(United States) Matt Kuchar	65	−5
T1	(United States) Jordan Spieth	65	−5
T4	(England) Paul Casey	66	−4
T4	(South Africa) Charl Schwartzel	66	−4
T6	(England) Richard Bland	67	−3
T6	(Spain) Rafa Cabrera-Bello	67	−3
T6	(Canada) Austin Connelly	67	−3
T6	(United States) Charley Hoffman	67	−3
T6	(England) Ian Poulter	67	−3
T6	(United States) Justin Thomas	67	−3

=== Second round ===
Friday, 21 July 2017

In difficult conditions, Jordan Spieth followed his first round 65 with a 69 to lead by two strokes from Matt Kuchar. Only eight players scored under par for their second rounds, Zach Johnson's 66 being the best round of the day. Alfie Plant was the only amateur to make the cut. He eagled the par-five 15th on his way to a 73 and a 36-hole total of 144.

Place	Player	Score	To par
1	(United States) Jordan Spieth	65-69=134	−6
2	(United States) Matt Kuchar	65-71=136	−4
T3	(United States) Brooks Koepka	65-72=137	−3
T3	(England) Ian Poulter	67-70=137	−3
5	(Scotland) Richie Ramsay	68-70=138	−2
T6	(England) Richard Bland	67-72=139	−1
T6	(Canada) Austin Connelly	67-72=139	−1
T6	(Northern Ireland) Rory McIlroy	71-68=139	−1
T6	(United States) Gary Woodland	70-69=139	−1
T10	(United States) Kent Bulle	68-72=140	E
T10	(Spain) Rafa Cabrera-Bello	67-73=140	E
T10	(United States) Charley Hoffman	67-73=140	E
T10	(United States) Russell Henley	70-70=140	E
T10	(United States) Chan Kim	72-68=140	E
T10	(United States) Jamie Lovemark	71-69=140	E
T10	(Netherlands) Joost Luiten	68-72=140	E
T10	(Japan) Hideki Matsuyama	68-72=140	E
T10	(Sweden) Alex Norén	68-72=140	E
T10	(United States) Bubba Watson	68-72=140	E

Amateurs: Plant (+4), Syme (+9), Cianchetti (+11), Ellis (+12), McNealy (+12)

=== Third round ===
Saturday, 22 July 2017

Jordan Spieth shot a 65 to take a three-stroke lead over Matt Kuchar, who shot a 66. On an easier day of scoring, Branden Grace scored 62, breaking the long-standing men's major championship record of 63. There were also low rounds from Dustin Johnson, with a 64, and Henrik Stenson, with a 65, both getting into a tie for 7th place.

Place	Player	Score	To par
1	(United States) Jordan Spieth	65-69-65=199	−11
2	(United States) Matt Kuchar	65-71-66=202	−8
T3	(Canada) Austin Connelly	67-72-66=205	−5
T3	(United States) Brooks Koepka	65-72-68=205	−5
T5	(South Africa) Branden Grace	70-74-62=206	−4
T5	(Japan) Hideki Matsuyama	68-72-66=206	−4
T7	(Spain) Rafa Cabrera-Bello	67-73-67=207	−3
T7	(United States) Dustin Johnson	71-72-64=207	−3
T7	(United States) Chan Kim	72-68-67=207	−3
T7	(Sweden) Henrik Stenson	69-73-65=207	−3

==== Grace scorecard ====
Hole	1	2	3	4	5	6	7	8	9	10	11	12	13	14	15	16	17	18
Par	4	4	4	3	4	4	3	4	4	4	4	3	4	3	5	4	5	4
(South Africa) Grace	−1	−1	−1	−2	−3	−3	−3	−4	−5	−5	−5	−5	−5	−6	−6	−7	−8	−8

Birdie

=== Final round ===
Sunday, 23 July 2017

Beginning the round with a three-shot lead, Jordan Spieth bogeyed three of his first four holes to fall into a tie with Matt Kuchar. A birdie at the 5th combined with a bogey by Kuchar at the 6th allowed Spieth to re-open a two-stroke advantage, but a bogey-birdie swing at the 9th evened the score heading to the back-nine. The score remained level until the 13th, when Spieth hit his tee shot well to the right of the fairway. Forced to take an unplayable lie and drop from the practice area, he managed to get up-and-down to save bogey while Kuchar took the lead by making par. At the par-3 14th, however, Spieth nearly holed his tee shot and converted the birdie attempt to tie Kuchar. Then at the par-5 15th, Spieth made a 48-foot (15 m) eagle putt to take the lead once again. With birdies on the next two holes Spieth played 14–17 in five-under to take a two-stroke lead heading to the last. When Kuchar found a greenside bunker and made bogey, Spieth was able to tap in for par and win the championship by three strokes. Li Haotong birdied his last four holes for 63 (−7) and jump into third place at 274 (−6), the best finish for an Asian player at the Open Championship since Lu Liang-Huan in 1971, also at Royal Birkdale. With the victory, Spieth joined Jack Nicklaus as the only golfers to win three legs of the career Grand Slam before the age of 24.

==== Final leaderboard ====
Champion
Silver Medal winner (low amateur)
(a) = amateur
(c) = past champion

Note: Top 10 and ties qualify for the 2018 Open Championship; top 4 and ties qualify for the 2018 Masters Tournament

Place	Player	Score	To par	Money ($)
1	(United States) Jordan Spieth	65-69-65-69=268	−12	1,845,000
2	(United States) Matt Kuchar	65-71-66-69=271	−9	1,067,000
3	(China) Li Haotong	69-73-69-63=274	−6	684,000
T4	(Spain) Rafa Cabrera-Bello	67-73-67-68=275	−5	480,000
T4	(Northern Ireland) Rory McIlroy (c)	71-68-69-67=275	−5	480,000
T6	(South Africa) Branden Grace	70-74-62-70=276	−4	281,000
T6	(United States) Brooks Koepka	65-72-68-71=276	−4	281,000
T6	(Australia) Marc Leishman	69-76-66-65=276	−4	281,000
T6	(Sweden) Alex Norén	68-72-69-67=276	−4	281,000
T6	(England) Matthew Southgate	72-72-67-65=276	−4	281,000

Leaderboard below the top 10
Place	Player	Score	To par	Money ($)
T11	(England) Paul Casey	66-77-67-67=277	−3	175,333
T11	(United States) Chan Kim	72-68-67-70=277	−3	175,333
T11	(Sweden) Henrik Stenson (c)	69-73-65-70=277	−3	175,333
T14	(Canada) Austin Connelly	67-72-66-73=278	−2	128,917
T14	(United States) Jason Dufner	73-71-66-68=278	−2	128,917
T14	(United States) Zach Johnson (c)	75-66-71-66=278	−2	128,917
T14	(Japan) Hideki Matsuyama	68-72-66-72=278	−2	128,917
T14	(England) Ian Poulter	67-70-71-70=278	−2	128,917
T14	(England) Chris Wood	71-72-68-67=278	−2	128,917
T20	(United States) Charley Hoffman	67-73-72-67=279	−1	104,500
T20	(United States) Xander Schauffele	69-75-70-65=279	−1	104,500
T22	(England) Richard Bland	67-72-70-71=280	E	88,000
T22	(United States) Rickie Fowler	71-71-67-71=280	E	88,000
T22	(United States) Jamie Lovemark	71-69-70-70=280	E	88,000
T22	(Scotland) Richie Ramsay	68-70-70-72=280	E	88,000
T22	(Australia) Adam Scott	69-74-70-67=280	E	88,000
T27	(Australia) Aaron Baddeley	69-76-72-64=281	+1	64,500
T27	(United States) Daniel Berger	68-76-70-67=281	+1	64,500
T27	(Australia) Jason Day	69-76-65-71=281	+1	64,500
T27	(Scotland) David Drysdale	72-73-66-70=281	+1	64,500
T27	(United States) Tony Finau	70-73-67-71=281	+1	64,500
T27	(England) Tommy Fleetwood	76-69-66-70=281	+1	64,500
T27	(Thailand) Thongchai Jaidee	70-73-68-70=281	+1	64,500
T27	(England) Andrew Johnston	69-74-67-71=281	+1	64,500
T27	(United States) Bubba Watson	68-72-71-70=281	+1	64,500
T27	(England) Lee Westwood	71-74-69-67=281	+1	64,500
T37	(England) Laurie Canter	70-72-72-68=282	+2	45,286
T37	(Spain) Sergio García	73-69-68-72=282	+2	45,286
T37	(United States) Russell Henley	70-70-75-67=282	+2	45,286
T37	(Germany) Martin Kaymer	72-72-70-68=282	+2	45,286
T37	(Denmark) Søren Kjeldsen	71-71-72-68=282	+2	45,286
T37	(United States) Webb Simpson	71-74-70-67=282	+2	45,286
T37	(United States) Steve Stricker	70-72-69-71=282	+2	45,286
T44	(South Korea) Chang Yi-keun	71-71-71-70=283	+3	31,070
T44	(Australia) Andrew Dodt	69-75-69-70=283	+3	31,070
T44	(England) Ross Fisher	70-72-66-75=283	+3	31,070
T44	(England) Matt Fitzpatrick	69-73-68-73=283	+3	31,070
T44	(South Korea) Kang Sung-hoon	68-73-76-66=283	+3	31,070
T44	(Netherlands) Joost Luiten	68-72-70-73=283	+3	31,070
T44	(United States) Kevin Na	68-75-68-72=283	+3	31,070
T44	(Belgium) Thomas Pieters	69-75-68-71=283	+3	31,070
T44	(Spain) Jon Rahm	69-74-70-70=283	+3	31,070
T44	(United States) Peter Uihlein	72-72-69-70=283	+3	31,070
T54	(Australia) Scott Hend	71-74-65-74=284	+4	25,843
T54	(United States) J. B. Holmes	71-72-71-70=284	+4	25,843
T54	(United States) Dustin Johnson	71-72-64-77=284	+4	25,843
T54	(United States) Kevin Kisner	70-71-74-69=284	+4	25,843
T54	(England) Justin Rose	71-74-69-70=284	+4	25,843
T54	(England) Toby Tree	70-75-69-70=284	+4	25,843
T54	(United States) Jimmy Walker	72-72-70-70=284	+4	25,843
61	(South Africa) Ernie Els (c)	68-73-70-74=285	+5	25,000
T62	(South Korea) Kim Kyung-tae	73-71-69-73=286	+6	24,500
T62	(France) Mike Lorenzo-Vera	75-70-70-71=286	+6	24,500
T62	(South Africa) Shaun Norris	71-74-65-76=286	+6	24,500
T62	(United States) Sean O'Hair	72-73-71-70=286	+6	24,500
T62	(Denmark) Thorbjørn Olesen	70-72-74-70=286	+6	24,500
T62	(England) Alfie Plant (a)	71-73-69-73=286	+6	0
T62	(South Africa) Charl Schwartzel	66-78-71-71=286	+6	24,500
T62	(South Korea) Song Young-han	71-74-69-72=286	+6	24,500
T70	(England) Joe Dean	72-72-70-73=287	+7	23,556
T70	(South Africa) Brandon Stone	73-72-68-74=287	+7	23,556
T70	(England) Andy Sullivan	70-75-69-73=287	+7	23,556
T70	(United States) Gary Woodland	70-69-74-74=287	+7	23,556
T74	(United States) James Hahn	68-76-70-74=288	+8	23,163
T74	(Austria) Bernd Wiesberger	69-75-71-73=288	+8	23,163
76	(England) Danny Willett	71-74-73-71=289	+9	22,975
77	(United States) Kent Bulle	68-72-74-76=290	+10	22,850
CUT	(United States) Roberto Castro	76-70=146	+6	
CUT	(England) Mark Foster	75-71=146	+6	
CUT	(New Zealand) Ryan Fox	74-72=146	+6	
CUT	(Republic of Ireland) Pádraig Harrington (c)	73-73=146	+6	
CUT	(India) Shiv Kapur	73-73=146	+6	
CUT	(South Korea) Kim Si-woo	70-76=146	+6	
CUT	(India) Anirban Lahiri	73-73=146	+6	
CUT	(Spain) Pablo Larrazábal	72-74=146	+6	
CUT	(France) Alexander Lévy	71-75=146	+6	
CUT	(United States) David Lipsky	68-78=146	+6	
CUT	(United States) Julian Suri	74-72=146	+6	
CUT	(Australia) Adam Bland	75-72=147	+7	
CUT	(England) Paul Broadhurst	75-72=147	+7	
CUT	(Australia) Matthew Griffin	70-77=147	+7	
CUT	(Scotland) Russell Knox	74-73=147	+7	
CUT	(Scotland) Martin Laird	68-79=147	+7	
CUT	(Italy) Francesco Molinari	73-74=147	+7	
CUT	(United States) Robert Streb	69-78=147	+7	
CUT	(United States) Justin Thomas	67-80=147	+7	
CUT	(England) Paul Waring	74-73=147	+7	
CUT	(Paraguay) Fabrizio Zanotti	77-70=147	+7	
CUT	(South Korea) An Byeong-hun	77-71=148	+8	
CUT	(Sweden) Alexander Björk	75-73=148	+8	
CUT	(United States) Kevin Chappell	73-75=148	+8	
CUT	(Northern Ireland) Darren Clarke (c)	75-73=148	+8	
CUT	(South Africa) Dylan Frittelli	73-75=148	+8	
CUT	(United States) Brian Harman	70-78=148	+8	
CUT	(South Korea) Kim Gi-whan	73-75=148	+8	
CUT	(South Africa) Jbe' Kruger	76-72=148	+8	
CUT	(United States) Tom Lehman (c)	72-76=148	+8	
CUT	(Australia) Ryan McCarthy	76-72=148	+8	
CUT	(England) Haydn McCullen	73-75=148	+8	
CUT	(United States) Ryan Moore	74-74=148	+8	
CUT	(United States) Patrick Reed	73-75=148	+8	
CUT	(United States) Kyle Stanley	70-78=148	+8	
CUT	(Argentina) Emiliano Grillo	76-73=149	+9	
CUT	(United States) Bill Haas	71-78=149	+9	
CUT	(Australia) Ashley Hall	75-74=149	+9	
CUT	(United States) Charles Howell III	74-75=149	+9	
CUT	(Scotland) Paul Lawrie (c)	70-79=149	+9	
CUT	(Wales) Stuart Manley	68-81=149	+9	
CUT	(United States) William McGirt	77-72=149	+9	
CUT	(United States) Pat Perez	74-75=149	+9	
CUT	(Australia) Cameron Smith	74-75=149	+9	
CUT	(Scotland) Connor Syme (a)	73-76=149	+9	
CUT	(United States) Stewart Cink (c)	77-73=150	+10	
CUT	(New Zealand) Michael Hendry	73-77=150	+10	
CUT	(England) David Horsey	75-75=150	+10	
CUT	(Japan) Yuta Ikeda	71-79=150	+10	
CUT	(Republic of Ireland) Shane Lowry	72-78=150	+10	
CUT	(Thailand) Prayad Marksaeng	76-74=150	+10	
CUT	(United States) Phil Mickelson (c)	73-77=150	+10	
CUT	(South Korea) Wang Jeung-hun	77-73=150	+10	
CUT	(Italy) Luca Cianchetti (a)	75-76=151	+11	
CUT	(United States) David Duval (c)	79-72=151	+11	
CUT	(England) Tyrrell Hatton	75-76=151	+11	
CUT	(England) Nick McCarthy	74-77=151	+11	
CUT	(United States) Mark O'Meara (c)	81-70=151	+11	
CUT	(Venezuela) Jhonattan Vegas	75-76=151	+11	
CUT	(United States) Wesley Bryan	74-78=152	+12	
CUT	(United States) John Daly (c)	74-78=152	+12	
CUT	(England) Harry Ellis (a)	77-75=152	+12	
CUT	(South Africa) Darren Fichardt	71-81=152	+12	
CUT	(United States) Billy Horschel	76-76=152	+12	
CUT	(United States) Maverick McNealy (a)	78-74=152	+12	
CUT	(Japan) Yūsaku Miyazato	70-82=152	+12	
CUT	(South Africa) Louis Oosthuizen (c)	78-74=152	+12	
CUT	(France) Matthieu Pavon	74-78=152	+12	
CUT	(England) Callum Shinkwin	74-78=152	+12	
CUT	(Japan) Hideto Tanihara	77-75=152	+12	
CUT	(United States) Bryson DeChambeau	76-77=153	+13	
CUT	(Canada) Adam Hadwin	71-82=153	+13	
CUT	(Scotland) Sandy Lyle (c)	77-76=153	+13	
CUT	(Colombia) Sebastián Muñoz	74-79=153	+13	
CUT	(United States) Brendan Steele	76-77=153	+13	
CUT	(Thailand) Phachara Khongwatmai	74-80=154	+14	
CUT	(England) Robert Dinwiddie	77-79=156	+16	
CUT	(England) Adam Hodkinson	80-76=156	+16	
CUT	(United States) Todd Hamilton (c)	79-79=158	+18	

==== Scorecard ====
Final round

Hole	1	2	3	4	5	6	7	8	9	10	11	12	13	14	15	16	17	18
Par	4	4	4	3	4	4	3	4	4	4	4	3	4	3	5	4	5	4
(United States) Spieth	−10	−10	−9	−8	−9	−9	−9	−9	−8	−8	−8	−8	−7	−8	−10	−11	−12	−12
(United States) Kuchar	−8	−9	−8	−8	−8	−7	−7	−7	−8	−8	−8	−8	−8	−8	−9	−9	−10	−9
(China) Li	+1	+1	+1	+1	+1	+1	+1	E	−1	−1	−1	−2	−2	−2	−3	−4	−5	−6
(Spain) Cabrera-Bello	−3	−3	−3	−3	−3	−3	−3	−4	−4	−4	−3	−4	−4	−4	−4	−4	−5	−5
(Northern Ireland) McIlroy	−2	−2	−2	−2	−2	−2	−2	−2	−3	−3	−4	−4	−4	−4	−3	−3	−5	−5

Cumulative tournament scores, relative to par

Eagle	Birdie	Bogey
