= 2008 Open Championship =

Coordinates: 53.622°N 3.033°W

Tournament information
- Dates: 17–20 July 2008
- Location: Southport, England
- Course: Royal Birkdale Golf Club
- Organized by: The R&A
- Tour(s): European Tour; PGA Tour; Japan Golf Tour

Statistics
- Par: 70
- Length: 7,173 yards (6,559 m)
- Field: 156 players, 83 after cut
- Cut: 149 (+9)
- Prize fund: £4,200,000 €5,335,867 $8,161,174
- Winner's share: £750,000 €938,565 $1,498,875

Champion
- (Republic of Ireland) Pádraig Harrington
- 283 (+3)

Location in England
Location in Southport, Merseyside,
north of Liverpool, England

The 2008 Open Championship was a men's major golf championship and the 137th Open Championship, played from 17 to 20 July at Royal Birkdale Golf Club in Southport, England. Pádraig Harrington successfully defended his Open Championship title, his second; he shot four under par over the final nine holes and was four strokes ahead of runner-up Ian Poulter. Harrington was the last golfer to win the same major back-to-back for a decade until Brooks Koepka won consecutive U.S. Opens in 2017 and 2018.

Television coverage was provided as usual by the BBC in the UK, and by ABC and TNT in the United States.

== Field ==
World Number One Tiger Woods was the most notable absentee, as he was recovering from knee surgery following his victory at the U.S. Open.

About two-thirds of the field each year consists of players that are fully exempt from qualifying for the Open. Below is the list of the exemption categories and the players who are exempt. Each player is classified according to the first category by which he qualified, but other categories are shown in parentheses. Some categories are not shown as all players in that category had already qualified from an earlier category:

1. First 10 and anyone tying for 10th place in the 2007 Open Championship
K. J. Choi (7,15,19), Stewart Cink (7,19), Ben Curtis (3,4), Ernie Els (3,4,5,7,15,19), Sergio García (5,7,14,15), Richard Green, Pádraig Harrington (3,4,5,7), Hunter Mahan (7,15,19), Andrés Romero (5,7), Steve Stricker (7,15,19), Mike Weir (7,19)

2. Past Open Champions born between 20 July 1942 and 19 July 1948
(Eligible but not competing: Tony Jacklin, Johnny Miller, Tom Weiskopf)

3. Past Open Champions aged 60 or under on 20 July 2008
Mark Calcavecchia (15), John Daly, David Duval (4), Todd Hamilton (4), Paul Lawrie (4), Tom Lehman, Justin Leonard (7), Sandy Lyle, Greg Norman, Mark O'Meara (4), Tom Watson (28)
(Eligible but not competing: Ian Baker-Finch, Seve Ballesteros, Nick Faldo, Nick Price, Bill Rogers, Tiger Woods)

4. The Open Champions for 1998-2007

5. First 20 in the PGA European Tour Final Order of Merit for 2007
Ángel Cabrera (7,11,19), Paul Casey (7), Nick Dougherty, Niclas Fasth (7), Retief Goosen (7,11,19), Anders Hansen (6), Søren Hansen (7), Peter Hanson, Grégory Havret, Søren Kjeldsen, Colin Montgomerie, Justin Rose (7,15), Henrik Stenson (7), Richard Sterne (7), Graeme Storm, Lee Westwood (7)

6. The BMW PGA Championship winners for 2006-2008
David Howell, Miguel Ángel Jiménez (7)

7. The first 50 players on the Official World Golf Rankings for Week 21, 2008
Robert Allenby, Stephen Ames (14), Stuart Appleby (19), Woody Austin (15,19), Aaron Baddeley (15), Tim Clark, Jim Furyk (15,19,23), J. B. Holmes, Trevor Immelman (12,19), Zach Johnson (12,15,19), Robert Karlsson, Martin Kaymer, Anthony Kim, Phil Mickelson (12,13,14,15,19), Geoff Ogilvy (11,15,19), Sean O'Hair, Rod Pampling, Ian Poulter, Jeff Quinney, Rory Sabbatini (15,19), Adam Scott (15,19), Vijay Singh (13,15,19), Brandt Snedeker (15), Scott Verplank (15,19), Boo Weekley, Oliver Wilson
(Eligible but not competing: Shingo Katayama, Luke Donald withdrew prior to start of tournament with a wrist injury, Toru Taniguchi withdrew prior to start of tournament with a back injury)

8. First 3 and anyone tying for 3rd place, not exempt having applied above, in the top 20 of the 2008 PGA European Tour Order of Merit on completion of the 2008 BMW PGA Championship
Richard Finch, Graeme McDowell, Damien McGrane

9. First 2 European Tour members and any European Tour members tying for 2nd place, not exempt, in a cumulative money list taken from all official PGA European Tour events from OWGR Week 19 up to and including the Open de France and including the U.S. Open
Pablo Larrazábal, Scott Strange

10. The leading player, not exempt having applied above, in the first 5 and ties of each of the 2008 European Open and the 2008 Barclays Scottish Open.
David Frost, Simon Khan

11. The U.S. Open Champions for 2004-2008
Michael Campbell

12. The U.S. Masters Champions for 2004-2008

13. The U.S. PGA Champions for 2003-2007
(Eligible but not competing: Shaun Micheel)

14. The U.S. PGA Tour Players Champions for 2006-2008

15. Top 20 on the Official Money List of the 2007 PGA Tour
Charles Howell III (19)

16. First 3 and anyone tying for 3rd place, not exempt having applied above, in the top 20 of the Official Money List of the 2008 PGA Tour on completion of the Crowne Plaza Invitational at Colonial
Bart Bryant, Ryuji Imada

17. First 2 PGA Tour members and any PGA Tour members tying for 2nd place, not exempt, in a cumulative money list taken from The Players Championship and the five PGA Tour events leading up to and including the 2008 AT&T National
Rocco Mediate
(Eligible but not competing: Kenny Perry)

18. The leading player, not exempt having applied above, in the first 5 and ties of each of the 2008 AT&T National and the 2008 John Deere Classic
Freddie Jacobson, Jay Williamson

19. Playing members of the 2007 Presidents Cup teams
Lucas Glover, Nick O'Hern (David Toms withdrew prior to start of tournament)

20. First place on the 2007 Asian Tour Order of Merit
Liang Wenchong

21. First 2 on the Order of Merit of the PGA Tour of Australasia for 2007
Craig Parry, David Smail

22. First place on the Order of Merit of the Southern Africa Sunshine Tour for 2007
James Kingston

23. The RBC Canadian Open Champion for 2007

24. The Japan Open Champion for 2007

25. First 2 on the Official Money List of the Japan Golf Tour for 2007
Brendan Jones, Hideto Tanihara

26. The leading 4 players, not exempt, in the 2008 Mizuno Open Yomiuri Classic
Michio Matsumura, Prayad Marksaeng, Yoshinobu Tsukada, Azuma Yano

27. First 2 and anyone tying for 2nd place, not exempt having applied (26) above, in a cumulative money list taken from all official Japan Golf Tour events from the 2008 Japan PGA Championship up to and including the 2008 Mizuno Open Yomiuri Classic
Hiroshi Iwata, Shintaro Kai

28. The Senior British Open Champion for 2007

29. The 2008 Amateur Champion
Reinier Saxton (a)

30. The U.S. Amateur Champion for 2007
(Colt Knost turned professional and forfeited his invitation.)

31. The European Individual Amateur Champion for 2007
Benjamin Hébert (a)

International Final Qualifying

Africa: Josh Cunliffe, Darren Fichardt, Doug McGuigan, Hennie Otto
Australasia: Peter Fowler, Brad Lamb, Ewan Porter, Andrew Tampion
Asia: Adam Blyth, Danny Chia, Lam Chih Bing, Angelo Que
America: Craig Barlow, Rich Beem, Alex Čejka, Tom Gillis, Paul Goydos, Matt Kuchar, Doug LaBelle II, Michael Letzig, Davis Love III, Scott McCarron, Jeff Overton, Tim Petrovic, John Rollins, Kevin Stadler
Europe: Thomas Aiken, Phillip Archer, Peter Baker, Grégory Bourdy, Ariel Cañete, Simon Dyson, Pelle Edberg, Johan Edfors, Ross Fisher, Jean-Baptiste Gonnet, David Horsey, José-Filipe Lima, Alex Norén, Simon Wakefield, Anthony Wall, Paul Waring, Steve Webster, Martin Wiegele

Local Final Qualifying (Monday 7 July and Tuesday 8 July)

Hillside: Rohan Blizard (a), Jamie Elson, Jean van de Velde, Chris Wood (a)
Southport and Ainsdale: Jon Bevan, Gary Boyd, Jamie Howarth, Tom Sherreard (a)
West Lancashire: Peter Appleyard, Barry Hume, Jonathan Lomas, Philip Walton

Alternates

- Camilo Villegas - took spot not taken by Kenny Perry
- Pat Perez - replaced Luke Donald
- Jerry Kelly - replaced David Toms
- Heath Slocum - replaced Toru Taniguchi

== Venue ==
=== Course layout ===
The 2008 Open Championship
Tee	Rating/Slope	1	2	3	4	5	6	7	8	9	Out	10	11	12	13	14	15	16	17	18	In	Total
Yards	n/a	450	421	451	201	346	499	178	457	414	3417	408	436	184	499	201	544	439	572	473	3756	7,173
Par		4	4	4	3	4	4	3	4	4	34	4	4	3	4	3	5	4	5	4	36	70

Lengths of the course for previous Opens:

- 1998: 7,018 yards (6,417 m), par 70
- 1991: 6,940 yards (6,346 m), par 70
- 1983: 6,968 yards (6,372 m), par 71
- 1976: 7,001 yards (6,402 m), par 72
- 1971: 7,080 yards (6,474 m), par 73
- 1965: 7,037 yards (6,435 m), par 73
- 1961: 6,844 yards (6,258 m), par 72
- 1954: 6,867 yards (6,279 m)

== Round summaries ==
=== First round ===
Thursday, 17 July 2008

Rocco Mediate, 2008 U.S. Open runner-up, shot a one-under par round of 69 to take the 18-hole lead alongside Graeme McDowell and Robert Allenby. One shot back at even-par was 53-year old two-time champion Greg Norman with fellow countryman Adam Scott.

Place	Player	Score	To par
T1	(Australia) Robert Allenby	69	−1
T1	(Northern Ireland) Graeme McDowell	69	−1
T1	(United States) Rocco Mediate	69	−1
T4	(United States) Bart Bryant	70	E
T4	(Australia) Greg Norman	70	E
T4	(Australia) Adam Scott	70	E
T7	(United States) Jim Furyk	71	+1
T7	(South Africa) Retief Goosen	71	+1
T7	(Sweden) Peter Hanson	71	+1
T7	(France) Grégory Havret	71	+1
T7	(Sweden) Freddie Jacobson	71	+1
T7	(England) Simon Wakefield	71	+1
T7	(England) Anthony Wall	71	+1
T7	(Canada) Mike Weir	71	+1

=== Second round ===
Friday, 18 July 2008

The cut was at 149 (+9) and 83 advanced, including Ernie Els and Phil Mickelson, who played in the terrible morning conditions in the first round.

Place	Player	Score	To par
1	(South Korea) K. J. Choi	72-67=139	−1
2	(Australia) Greg Norman	70-70=140	E
3	(Colombia) Camilo Villegas	76-65=141	+1
T4	(Australia) Robert Allenby	69-73=142	+2
T4	(United States) David Duval	73-69=142	+2
T4	(United States) Jim Furyk	71-71=142	+2
T4	(Republic of Ireland) Pádraig Harrington	74-68=142	+2
T4	(Northern Ireland) Graeme McDowell	69-73=142	+2
T4	(United States) Rocco Mediate	69-73=142	+2
T4	(Sweden) Alex Norén	72-70=142	+2

Amateurs: Wood (+5), Sherreard (+6), Hébert (+12), Blizard (+15), Saxton (+17).

=== Third round ===
Saturday, 19 July 2008

Greg Norman, age 53, became the oldest to hold at least a share of the 54-hole lead (it lasted just one year, as Tom Watson led after three rounds in 2009 at age 59). Due to extremely high winds, there were no under-par rounds, and it was first time since 1986 when the 54-hole leader was not under par.

Place	Player	Score	To par
1	(Australia) Greg Norman	70-70-72=212	+2
T2	(South Korea) K. J. Choi	72-67-75=214	+4
T2	(Republic of Ireland) Pádraig Harrington	74-68-72=214	+4
4	(England) Simon Wakefield	71-74-70=215	+5
T5	(United States) Ben Curtis	78-69-70=217	+7
T5	(England) Ross Fisher	72-74-71=217	+7
T5	(United States) Anthony Kim	72-74-71=217	+7
T5	(Sweden) Alex Norén	72-70-75=217	+7
T9	(Australia) Robert Allenby	69-73-76=218	+8
T9	(United States) Rocco Mediate	69-73-76=218	+8
T9	(England) Ian Poulter	72-71-75=218	+8
T9	(Sweden) Henrik Stenson	76-72-70=218	+8
T9	(England) Graeme Storm	76-70-72=218	+8
T9	(England) Chris Wood (a)	75-70-73=218	+8

=== Final round ===
Sunday, 20 July 2008

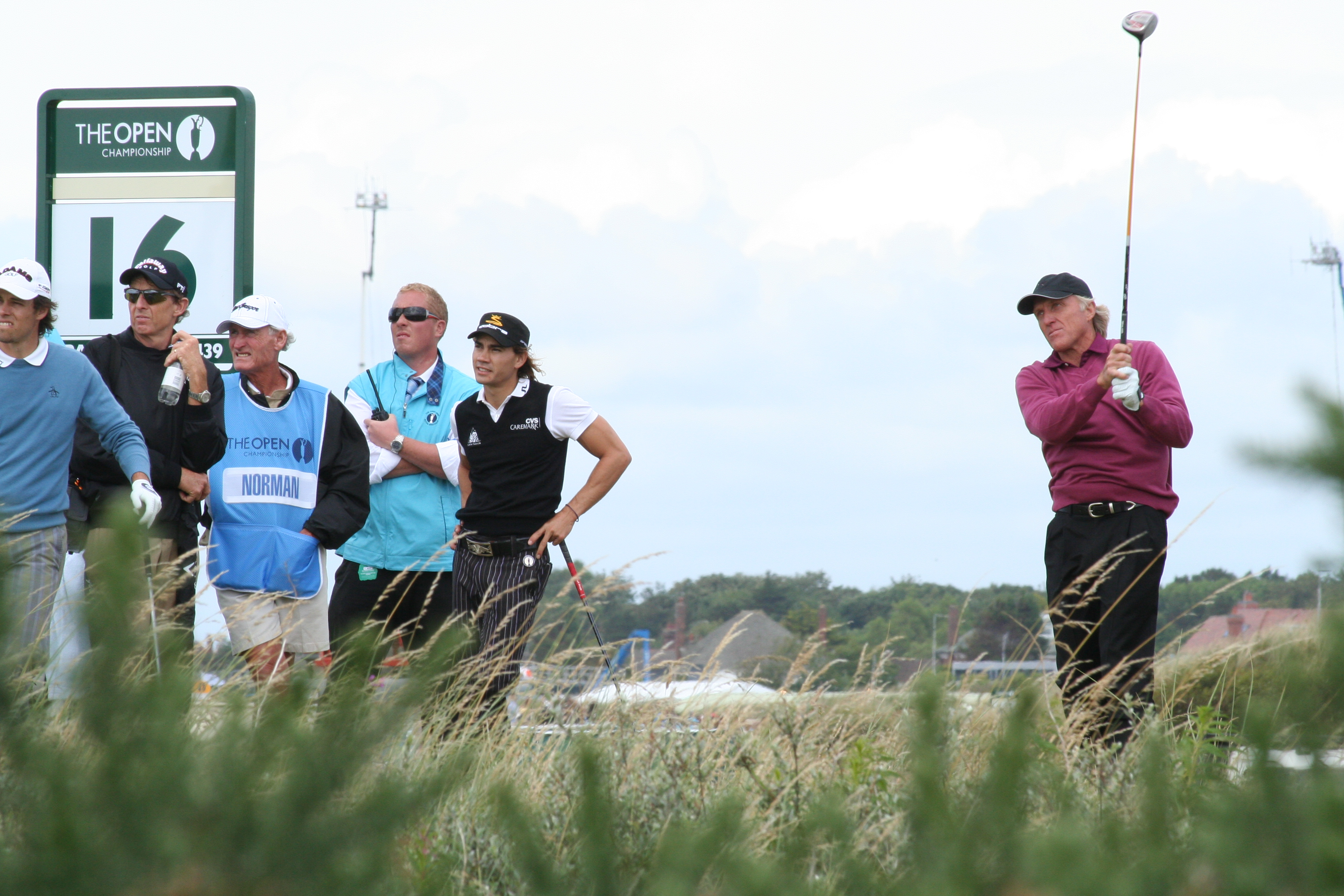
Greg Norman at the 2008 Open Championship

Despite a wrist injury that almost forced him to withdraw prior to the tournament, Pádraig Harrington successfully defended his Open Championship title. Harrington pulled away from the field with a tremendous back nine and became only the fifth to repeat at the Open in the last fifty years. Runner-up Ian Poulter matched Harrington's 69 and was four strokes back, while Greg Norman faltered with eight bogeys for 77 and tied for third place with Henrik Stenson.

Place	Player	Score	To par	Money (£)
1	(Republic of Ireland) Pádraig Harrington	74-68-72-69=283	+3	750,000
2	(England) Ian Poulter	72-71-75-69=287	+7	450,000
T3	(Australia) Greg Norman	70-70-72-77=289	+9	255,000
T3	(Sweden) Henrik Stenson	76-72-70-71=289	+9	255,000
T5	(United States) Jim Furyk	71-71-77-71=290	+10	180,000
T5	(England) Chris Wood (a)	75-70-73-72=290	+10	0
T7	(Australia) Robert Allenby	69-73-76-74=292	+12	96,450
T7	(Canada) Stephen Ames	73-70-78-71=292	+12	96,450
T7	(England) Paul Casey	78-71-73-70=292	+12	96,450
T7	(United States) Ben Curtis	78-69-70-75=292	+12	96,450
T7	(South Africa) Ernie Els	80-69-74-69=292	+12	96,450
T7	(England) David Howell	76-71-78-67=292	+12	96,450
T7	(Sweden) Robert Karlsson	75-73-75-69=292	+12	96,450
T7	(United States) Anthony Kim	72-74-71-75=292	+12	96,450
T7	(United States) Steve Stricker	77-71-71-73=292	+12	96,450

Amateurs: Wood (+10), Sherreard (+14).

- (a) denotes amateur

==== Scorecard ====
Final round

Hole	1	2	3	4	5	6	7	8	9	10	11	12	13	14	15	16	17	18
Par	4	4	4	3	4	4	3	4	4	4	4	3	4	3	5	4	5	4
(Republic of Ireland) Harrington	+4	+4	+4	+4	+4	+4	+5	+6	+7	+7	+7	+7	+6	+6	+5	+5	+3	+3
(England) Poulter	+9	+9	+10	+10	+10	+10	+10	+10	+9	+9	+8	+8	+8	+8	+8	+7	+7	+7
(Australia) Norman	+3	+4	+5	+5	+5	+6	+6	+6	+6	+7	+7	+8	+9	+9	+8	+8	+8	+9
(Sweden) Stenson	+9	+9	+9	+9	+9	+10	+10	+10	+9	+9	+9	+9	+9	+10	+9	+9	+8	+9
(United States) Furyk	+10	+11	+11	+11	+11	+11	+11	+11	+11	+11	+11	+11	+11	+11	+10	+10	+10	+10
(England) Wood	+8	+8	+9	+9	+9	+9	+8	+8	+7	+7	+8	+9	+10	+10	+10	+10	+9	+10
(South Korea) Choi	+5	+5	+5	+6	+7	+8	+9	+10	+10	+10	+11	+11	+11	+11	+11	+10	+9	+13

Cumulative tournament scores, relative to par

Eagle	Birdie	Bogey	Double bogey	Triple bogey+
