= 1998 Open Championship =

Coordinates: 53.622°N 3.033°W

Tournament information
- Dates: 16–19 July 1998
- Location: Southport, England
- Course: Royal Birkdale Golf Club
- Tour(s): European Tour; PGA Tour; Japan Golf Tour

Statistics
- Par: 70
- Length: 7,018 yards (6,417 m)
- Field: 156 players, 81 after cut
- Cut: 146 (+6)
- Prize fund: £1,700,000 €2,483,810 $2,750,000
- Winner's share: £300,000 €420,000 $493,500

Champion
- (United States) Mark O'Meara
- 280 (E), playoff

Location in England
Location in Southport, Merseyside,
north of Liverpool, England

The 1998 Open Championship was a men's major golf championship and the 127th Open Championship, held from 16 to 19 July at the Royal Birkdale Golf Club in Southport, England. In weekend wind and rain, Mark O'Meara won his second major championship of the year and first Open Championship in a playoff over Brian Watts, the 54-hole leader.

Three months earlier, O'Meara won the Masters on the final green by sinking a 20-foot (6 m) birdie putt. At age 41, he became the oldest player to win two majors in a year: Jack Nicklaus (1980), Ben Hogan (1953), and Craig Wood (1941) were all age forty. (Hogan won three majors and turned 41 two weeks after the third.) This was also the first major championship since the 1961 PGA Championship in which Nicklaus was not in the field.

At the previous Open at Royal Birkdale seven years earlier in 1991, O'Meara was a co-leader after 54 holes, shot 69, and tied for third.

== Course ==
Hole	1	2	3	4	5	6	7	8	9	Out	10	11	12	13	14	15	16	17	18	In	Total
Yards	449	421	407	203	344	480	177	457	411	3,349	403	408	183	498	198	544	416	547	472	3,669	7,018
Par	4	4	4	3	4	4	3	4	4	34	4	4	3	4	3	5	4	5	4	36	70

Lengths of the course for previous Opens:

- 1991: 6,940 yards (6,346 m), par 70
- 1983: 6,968 yards (6,372 m), par 71
- 1976: 7,001 yards (6,402 m), par 72
- 1971: 7,080 yards (6,474 m), par 73
- 1965: 7,037 yards (6,435 m), par 73
- 1961: 6,844 yards (6,258 m)
- 1954: 6,867 yards (6,279 m)

== Round summaries ==
=== First round ===
Thursday, 16 July 1998

Place	Player	Score	To par
T1	(United States) John Huston	65	−5
T1	(United States) Tiger Woods	65	−5
T3	(United States) Fred Couples	66	−4
T3	(Zimbabwe) Nick Price	66	−4
T3	(United States) Loren Roberts	66	−4
T6	(Australia) Robert Allenby	67	−3
T6	(United States) Brad Faxon	67	−3
T6	(Sweden) Freddie Jacobson	67	−3
T6	(United States) Davis Love III	67	−3
T6	(Fiji) Vijay Singh	67	−3

=== Second round ===
Friday, 17 July 1998

Place	Player	Score	To par
1	(United States) Brian Watts	68-69=137	−3
T2	(Zimbabwe) Nick Price	66-72=138	−2
T2	(England) Justin Rose (a)	72-66=138	−2
T2	(United States) Tiger Woods	65-73=138	−2
5	(Denmark) Thomas Bjørn	68-71=139	−1
T6	(Trinidad and Tobago) Stephen Ames	68-72=140	E
T6	(United States) Fred Couples	66-74=140	E
T6	(United States) Jim Furyk	70-70=140	E
T6	(United States) Davis Love III	67-73=140	E
T6	(United States) Mark O'Meara	72-68=140	E
T6	(Sweden) Jesper Parnevik	68-72=140	E

Amateurs: Rose (-2), García (+4), De Vooght (+6), McCarthy (+8), Kuchar (+10).

=== Third round ===
Saturday, 18 July 1998

Place	Player	Score	To par
1	(United States) Brian Watts	68-69-73=210	E
T2	(United States) Jim Furyk	70-70-72=212	+2
T2	(United States) Mark O'Meara	72-68-72=212	+2
T2	(Sweden) Jesper Parnevik	68-72-72=212	+2
5	(England) Justin Rose (a)	72-66-75=213	+3
T6	(Denmark) Thomas Bjørn	68-71-76=215	+5
T6	(United States) Brad Faxon	67-74-74=215	+5
T6	(United States) John Huston	65-77-73=215	+5
T6	(United States) Tiger Woods	65-73-77=215	+5
T10	(United States) David Duval	70-71-75=216	+6
T10	(Italy) Costantino Rocca	72-74-70=216	+6
T10	(Scotland) Raymond Russell	68-73-75=216	+6
T10	(Japan) Katsuyoshi Tomori	75-71-70=216	+6

=== Final round ===
Sunday, 19 July 1998

Place	Player	Score	To par	Money (£)
T1	(United States) Mark O'Meara	72-68-72-68=280	E	Playoff
T1	(United States) Brian Watts	68-69-73-70=280	E	Playoff
3	(United States) Tiger Woods	65-73-77-66=281	+1	135,000
T4	(United States) Jim Furyk	70-70-72-70=282	+2	76,667
T4	(Sweden) Jesper Parnevik	68-72-72-70=282	+2	76,667
T4	(England) Justin Rose (a)	72-66-75-69=282	+2	0
T4	(Scotland) Raymond Russell	68-73-75-66=282	+2	76,667
8	(United States) Davis Love III	67-73-77-68=285	+5	49,500
T9	(Denmark) Thomas Bjørn	68-71-76-71=286	+6	40,850
T9	(Italy) Costantino Rocca	72-74-70-70=286	+6	40,850

Amateurs: Rose (+2), García (+12), De Vooght (+19).

==== Playoff ====
The four-hole aggregate playoff was played on the concluding holes (15–18).
O'Meara birdied the first, while Watts parred, and they halved the next two holes with pars.
Watts bogeyed the final hole, while O'Meara parred to win the playoff by two strokes and the Claret Jug.

Place	Player	Score	To par	Money (£)
1	(United States) Mark O'Meara	4-4-5-4=17	−1	300,000
2	(United States) Brian Watts	5-4-5-5=19	+1	188,000

- Four-hole aggregate playoff on holes 15–18

===== Scorecard =====
Hole	15	16	17	18
Par	5	4	5	4
(United States) O'Meara	−1	−1	−1	−1
(United States) Watts	E	E	E	+1

Cumulative playoff scores, relative to par

Eagle	Birdie	Bogey	Double bogey
