= Royal Birkdale Golf Club =

Golf course in the United Kingdom

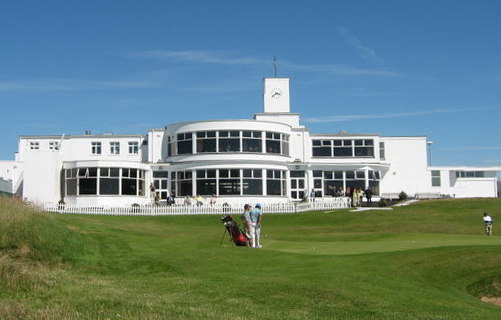
- Clubhouse in 2008

- Location in Southport, Merseyside, north of Liverpool, England Royal Birkdale Golf Club (England)
- 53.622°N 3.033°W

Club information
- Location: Southport, England
- Established: 1889 (1894)
- Type: Private
- Total holes: 18
- Tournaments: The Open Championship; The Amateur; Senior British Open; Women's British Open
- Website: royalbirkdale.com
- Designed by: Frederick G. Hawtree; J.H. Taylor; Tom Mackenzie (2024 renovation)
- Par: 70
- Length: 7,156 yards (6,543 m)
- Course rating: 76.5
- Slope rating: 151

Royal Birkdale Golf Club is a golf course in Southport, England. It is one of the clubs in the rotation for both the Open Championship and Women's British Open and has hosted the Open Championship eleven times between 1954 and 2026. Winners of the Open at the course include Pádraig Harrington, Mark O'Meara, Ian Baker-Finch, Tom Watson, Johnny Miller, Lee Trevino, Arnold Palmer, Peter Thomson (twice), Jordan Spieth, and Ryan Fox.

Royal Birkdale hosted the women's tournament for a sixth time in 2014, and was the site of the Senior Open Championship in 2013. It has also hosted the Ryder Cup (1965, 1969), the Walker Cup (1951), and the Curtis Cup (1948). Other courses in the Open rota near Liverpool are Royal Liverpool Golf Club (Hoylake) and Royal Lytham & St Annes Golf Club.

On 22 July 2017, in the third round of the 2017 Open Championship, Branden Grace became the first man in major championship history to record a score of 62 in a single round.

== History ==
Founded in 1889 as Birkdale Golf Club, the club was awarded "Royal" status in 1951. Birkdale Golf Club moved to a new site in Birkdale Hills in 1894, and a new distinctive art deco clubhouse was built in 1935. In early 1939, Birkdale was nominated as the venue for the 1940 Open Championship but the Second World War started in September 1939 and the Championship was cancelled.

In 1946, the club finally hosted its first big championship, the Amateur Championship, won by Irishman Jimmy Bruen. During the immediate postwar era, the club also hosted the 1948 Curtis Cup and the 1951 Walker Cup, both won by the United States. With these successful stagings of important events, Royal Birkdale was felt to be ready for its first Open Championship in 1954 and has continued on the Open rota ever since.

Three generations of the Hawtree family of golf course architects have worked on the course. Frederick G. Hawtree and champion golfer J.H. Taylor are the two people most responsible for the current routing, following the valleys between the very large dunes which dominate the property. The arrangement makes for excellent spectator conditions during major events. Frederick W. Hawtree, the son of Frederick G, performed some modifications in the 1960s and in 1993 Martin Hawtree, son of Frederick W., improved and modernised the layout further, with all 18 of the club's greens being completely rebuilt, to improve turf and drainage following the 1991 Open Championship. Only relatively minor tweaking, such as the addition of a few new bunkers and back tees, has been deemed necessary in advance of the last two Open Championships. The course was ranked as the 18th-best in the world outside the United States, in the 2007 rankings by Golf Digest magazine.

During the 1960s, the club hosted the Ryder Cup twice, in 1965 and in 1969. The United States won in 1965 by the score of 19½–12½, but in 1969 the competition ended in a 16–16 tie when Jack Nicklaus generously conceded a short putt to Tony Jacklin to halve their match, which later became known as "The Concession". As defending champions in a tie, the U.S. retained the trophy; they kept it for another sixteen years, until 1985.

In 2013, the club hosted the Senior Open Championship.

In the run-up to the 2026 Open Championship, a number of alterations were made to the course, most notably:

- The bow-shaped fairway of the 5th hole was straightened out.
- The green of the 7th hole was raised.
- The 14th hole was removed from the course. The 15th hole was lengthened and became the new 14th hole.
- A new par-3 15th hole was built, with the clubhouse as backdrop.
- Bunkers were dug out or filled in around the course.

== Open Championship ==
The Open Championship was first held at Royal Birkdale in 1954 and has hosted eleven times.

Year	Winner	Par	Score					Winner's share (£)
Year	Winner	Par	R1	R2	R3	R4	Total	Winner's share (£)
1954	(Australia) Peter Thomson ^{1st}	73	72	71	69	71	283 (−9)	750
1961	(United States) Arnold Palmer ^{1st}	72	70	73	69	72	284 (−4)	1,400
1965	(Australia) Peter Thomson ^{5th}	73	74	68	72	71	285 (−7)	1,750
1971	(United States) Lee Trevino ^{1st}	73	69	70	69	70	278 (−14)	5,500
1976	(United States) Johnny Miller	72	72	68	73	66	279 (−9)	7,500
1983	(United States) Tom Watson ^{5th}	71	67	68	70	70	275 (−9)	40,000
1991	(Australia) Ian Baker-Finch	70	71	71	64	66	272 (−8)	90,000
1998	(United States) Mark O'Meara	70	72	68	72	68	280 (E)^{PO}	300,000
2008	(Republic of Ireland) Pádraig Harrington ^{2nd}	70	74	68	72	69	283 (+3)	750,000
2017	(United States) Jordan Spieth	70	65	69	65	69	268 (−12)	1,420,000
2026	(New Zealand) Ryan Fox	70	72	68	62	68	270 (–10)	2,388,000

- Note: For multiple winners of The Open Championship, superscript ordinal identifies which in their respective careers.

The Open began paying in U.S. dollars in 2017, subsequent figures in pounds are rounded estimates.

== Women’s British Open ==
Winners of the Women's British Open at Royal Birkdale. The course was the first on the men's rota to be placed into the women's rota.

Year	Winner	Winner's share ($)
1982	(Spain) Marta Figueras-Dotti (a)	(10,350)
1986	(England) Laura Davies	12,900
2000	(Sweden) Sophie Gustafson	178,000
**2005**	(South Korea) Jeong Jang	280,028
**2010**	(Taiwan) Yani Tseng^{1st}	408,714
**2014**	(United States) Mo Martin	474,575

Notes

- For multiple winners of the Women's British Open, superscript ordinal identifies which in their respective careers.
- Years in **bold** signify editions that were recognised as majors by the LPGA Tour (2001–present).
  Since its inception in 1979, the Ladies European Tour (LET) has recognised the Women's British Open as a major.

== Scorecard ==
Tee	Rating/Slope	1	2	3	4	5	6	7	8	9	Out	10	11	12	13	14	15	16	17	18	In	Total
Black	76.5 / 151	443	416	444	215	322	512	149	456	411	3368	399	431	183	499	600	237	390	563	506	3808	7156
Par		4	4	4	3	4	4	3	4	4	34	4	4	3	4	5	3	4	5	4	36	70
Red	74.5 / 149	443	407	421	194	322	479	137	409	402	3214	378	384	175	469	553	202	355	505	501	3512	6817
Blue	M:71.8 / 143 W:78.2 / 148	424	385	325	183	302	447	125	392	376	2959	348	353	156	429	513	166	319	496	466	3246	6205
Gold	M:68.1 / 132 W:74.1 / 139	367	343	312	162	246	402	108	353	337	2630	323	318	142	377	443	131	291	443	413	2881	5511
Green	M:65.0 / 114 W:70.0 / 133	338	316	276	110	241	377	77	299	283	2317	297	269	96	324	413	109	262	402	388	2560	4877
Par		4	4	4	3	4	5	3	4	4	35	4	4	3	4	5	3	4	5	5	37	72

Lengths of the course for previous Opens:

- 2017: 7,156 yards (6,543 m), par 70
- 2008: 7,173 yards (6,559 m), par 70
- 1998: 7,018 yards (6,417 m), par 70
- 1991: 6,940 yards (6,346 m), par 70
- 1983: 6,968 yards (6,372 m), par 71
- 1976: 7,001 yards (6,402 m), par 72
- 1971: 7,080 yards (6,474 m), par 73
- 1965: 7,037 yards (6,435 m), par 73
- 1961: 6,844 yards (6,258 m), par 72
- 1954: 6,867 yards (6,279 m), par 73

== See also ==
- List of golf clubs granted Royal status
