= 1971 Open Championship =

Coordinates: 53.622°N 3.033°W

- Front cover of the 1971 Open programme

Tournament information
- Dates: 7–10 July 1971
- Location: Southport, England
- Course: Royal Birkdale Golf Club

Statistics
- Par: 73
- Length: 7,080 yards (6,474 m)
- Field: 150 players 82 after 1st cut 64 after 2nd cut
- Cut: 151 (+5) (1st cut); 224 (+5) (2nd cut)
- Prize fund: £45,000 $108,000
- Winner's share: £5,500 $13,200

Champion
- (United States) Lee Trevino
- 278 (−14)

Location in England
Location in Southport, Merseyside,
north of Liverpool, England

The 1971 Open Championship was the 100th Open Championship, played 7–10 July at Royal Birkdale Golf Club in Southport, England. Lee Trevino won the first of his consecutive Open Championships, one stroke ahead of Lu Liang-Huan. It was the third of his six major titles and his second consecutive; he won the U.S. Open less than a month earlier in a playoff over Jack Nicklaus.

Trevino became the fourth player to win both the U.S. Open and the Open Championship in the same year, joining Bobby Jones (1926, 1930), Gene Sarazen (1932), and Ben Hogan (1953). Subsequent winners of both were Tom Watson (1982) and Tiger Woods (2000); all six are Americans.

Trevino also won the Canadian Open the previous week near Montreal for three national titles in 1971, all won in less than a month.

This was the last major championship of 1971 because the PGA Championship was played in February instead of its traditional date in August. (In 2019 the PGA moved to May.) Trevino's win, therefore, assured that Americans won all four major championships in 1971 (Charles Coody won the Masters Tournament and Nicklaus captured the PGA). This was the fifth time this had happened in golf history. (It has happened six more times since 1971, most recently in 2024.)

== Course ==
Hole	1	2	3	4	5	6	7	8	9	Out	10	11	12	13	14	15	16	17	18	In	Total
Yards	493	427	416	212	358	473	158	459	410	3,406	393	412	190	517	202	536	401	510	513	3,674	7,080
Par	5	4	4	3	4	4	3	4	4	35	4	4	3	5	3	5	4	5	5	38	73

Lengths of the course for previous Opens:

- 1965: 7,037 yards (6,435 m), par 73
- 1961: 6,844 yards (6,258 m)
- 1954: 6,867 yards (6,279 m)

== Round summaries ==
=== First round ===
Wednesday, 7 July 1971

Place	Player	Score	To par
T1	(Argentina) Vicente Fernández	69	−4
T1	(England) Tony Jacklin	69	−4
T1	(United States) Howie Johnson	69	−4
T1	(United States) Lee Trevino	69	−4
T5	(United States) Billy Casper	70	−3
T5	(England) Tommy Horton	70	−3
T5	(Taiwan) Lu Liang-Huan	70	−3
T5	(Australia) Kel Nagle	70	−3
T5	(Republic of Ireland) John O'Leary	70	−3
T5	(Australia) Peter Thomson	70	−3
T5	(England) Brian Waites	70	−3

=== Second round ===
Thursday, 8 July 1971

Place	Player	Score	To par
T1	(England) Tony Jacklin	69-70=139	−7
T1	(United States) Lee Trevino	69-70=139	−7
3	(Taiwan) Lu Liang-Huan	70-70=140	−6
T4	(Argentina) Roberto De Vicenzo	71-70=141	−5
T4	(South Africa) Gary Player	71-70=141	−5
T6	(United States) Billy Casper	70-72=142	−4
T6	(England) Malcolm Gregson	71-71=142	−4
T6	(England) Tommy Horton	70-72=142	−4
T6	(Republic of Ireland) Jimmy Kinsella	74-68=142	−4
T6	(United States) Jack Nicklaus	71-71=142	−4

Amateurs: Bonallack (−3), Melnyk (+4),
Humphreys (+6), Berry (+7), Carr (+8), M. Foster (+9), Birtwell (+11), Bird (+12), Rolley (+14).

=== Third round ===
Friday, 9 July 1971

Place	Player	Score	To par
1	(United States) Lee Trevino	69-70-69=208	−11
T2	(England) Tony Jacklin	69-70-70=209	−10
T2	(Taiwan) Lu Liang-Huan	70-70-69=209	−10
T4	(Wales) Craig Defoy	72-72-68=212	−7
T4	(South Africa) Gary Player	71-70-71=212	−7
T6	(Argentina) Roberto De Vicenzo	71-70-72=213	−6
T6	(South Africa) Dale Hayes	71-72-70=213	−6
T6	(England) Peter Oosterhuis	76-71-66=213	−6
T9	(United States) Jack Nicklaus	71-71-72=214	−5
T9	(Spain) Ramón Sota	72-72-70=214	−5

Amateurs: Bonallack (−2), Melnyk (+4).

=== Final round ===
Saturday, 10 July 1971

Place	Player	Score	To par	Money (£)
1	(United States) Lee Trevino	69-70-69-70=278	−14	5,500
2	(Taiwan) Lu Liang-Huan	70-70-69-70=279	−13	4,000
3	(England) Tony Jacklin	69-70-70-71=280	−12	3,250
4	(Wales) Craig Defoy	72-72-68-69=281	−11	2,750
T5	(United States) Charles Coody	74-71-70-68=283	−9	2,300
T5	(United States) Jack Nicklaus	71-71-72-69=283	−9	2,300
T7	(United States) Billy Casper	70-72-75-67=284	−8	1,775
T7	(South Africa) Gary Player	71-70-71-72=284	−8	1,775
T9	(United States) Doug Sanders	73-71-74-67=285	−7	1,550
T9	(Australia) Peter Thomson	70-73-73-69=285	−7	1,550

Amateurs: Bonallack (−1), Melnyk (+6)

- The exchange rate at the time was approximately 2.41 dollars (US) per pound sterling.
