= 1983 Open Championship =

Coordinates: 53.622°N 3.033°W

Tournament information
- Dates: 14–17 July 1983
- Location: Southport, England
- Course: Royal Birkdale Golf Club
- Tour(s): European Tour; PGA Tour

Statistics
- Par: 71
- Length: 6,968 yards (6,372 m)
- Field: 151 players 83 after 1st cut 63 after 2nd cut
- Cut: 146 (+4) (1st cut); 217 (+4) (2nd cut)
- Prize fund: £400,000 $600,000
- Winner's share: £40,000 $60,000

Champion
- (United States) Tom Watson
- 275 (−9)

Location in England
Location in Southport, Merseyside,
north of Liverpool, England

The 1983 Open Championship was a men's major golf championship and the 112th Open Championship, held from 14 to 17 July at Royal Birkdale Golf Club in Southport, England. It was the sixth time the course had hosted, with the first in 1954.

Defending champion Tom Watson won his fifth Open Championship, one stroke ahead of runners-up Andy Bean and Hale Irwin. It was his second consecutive Open win and third in the last four, but was helped by Irwin "whiffing" a one-inch putt on the 14th hole on the third day, which cost him a chance of a play-off with Watson for the tournament.

At age 33, this was Watson's eighth and final major title; he had won three of the last six majors, but had not won any event for twelve months.

Watson was the fifth to win five Open Championships, last accomplished in 1965 by Peter Thomson, also at Royal Birkdale. He was the first to successfully defend the title in over a decade, since Lee Trevino in 1972 at Muirfield. Of his five Open wins, this was the only one outside Scotland.

Seven years earlier at Royal Birkdale in 1976, defending champion Watson posted an 80 in the third round, finishing with a pair of sixes, and missed the 54-hole cut by a stroke.

== Course layout ==
Hole	1	2	3	4	5	6	7	8	9	Out	10	11	12	13	14	15	16	17	18	In	Total
Yards	450	423	410	206	343	468	150	470	410	3,330	384	411	184	505	198	542	415	526	473	3,638	6,968
Par	4	4	4	3	4	4	3	4	4	34	4	4	3	5	3	5	4	5	4	37	71

== Round summaries ==
=== First round ===
Thursday, 14 July 1983

Place	Player	Score	To par
1	(United States) Craig Stadler	64	−7
T2	(West Germany) Bernhard Langer	67	−4
T2	(United States) Bill Rogers	67	−4
T2	(United States) Tom Watson	67	−4
T5	(England) Nick Faldo	68	−3
T5	(Australia) Mike Ferguson	68	−3
T5	(Australia) Vaughan Somers	68	−3
T5	(United States) Hal Sutton	68	−3
T5	(Scotland) Sam Torrance	68	−3
T10	(Republic of Ireland) Eamonn Darcy	69	−2
T10	(England) David Dunk	69	−2
T10	(United States) Hubert Green	69	−2
T10	(Australia) Graham Marsh	69	−2
T10	(Wales) Philip Parkin (a)	69	−2
T10	(United States) Lee Trevino	69	−2

=== Second round ===
Friday, 15 July 1983

Place	Player	Score	To par
1	(United States) Craig Stadler	64-70=134	−8
T2	(United States) Lee Trevino	69-66=135	−7
T2	(United States) Tom Watson	67-68=135	−7
4	(England) Nick Faldo	68-68=136	−6
5	(United States) Hale Irwin	69-68=137	−5
T6	(United States) Raymond Floyd	72-66=138	−4
T6	(Australia) Terry Gale	72-66=138	−4
T6	(United States) Bill Rogers	67-71=138	−4
T9	(United States) Andy Bean	70-69=139	−3
T9	(England) Denis Durnian	73-66=139	−3
T9	(West Germany) Bernhard Langer	67-72=139	−3
T9	(Australia) Graham Marsh	69-70=139	−3
T9	(United States) Hal Sutton	68-71=139	−3

Amateurs: Parkin (+5), Gilford (+7), Plaxton (+12), Thompson (+12), Wood (+12), Hamer (+13), Thomas (+13), Crosby (+17).

=== Third round ===
Saturday, 16 July 1983

Place	Player	Score	To par
1	(United States) Tom Watson	67-68-70=205	−8
2	(United States) Craig Stadler	64-70-72=206	−7
T3	(England) Nick Faldo	68-68-71=207	−6
T3	(United States) Raymond Floyd	72-66-69=207	−6
T3	(Australia) David Graham	71-69-67=207	−6
6	(United States) Lee Trevino	69-66-73=208	−5
T7	(United States) Andy Bean	70-69-70=209	−4
T7	(United States) Hale Irwin	69-68-72=209	−4
T7	(Zimbabwe) Mark McNulty	72-69-68=209	−4
T7	(United States) Fuzzy Zoeller	71-71-67=209	−4

=== Final round ===
Sunday, 17 July 1983

Place	Player	Score	To par	Money (£)
1	(United States) Tom Watson	67-68-70-70=275	−9	40,000
T2	(United States) Andy Bean	70-69-70-67=276	−8	23,000
T2	(United States) Hale Irwin	69-68-72-67=276	−8	23,000
4	(Australia) Graham Marsh	69-70-74-64=277	−7	15,000
5	(United States) Lee Trevino	69-66-73-70=278	−6	13,600
T6	(Spain) Seve Ballesteros	71-71-69-68=279	−5	12,250
T6	(South Africa) Harold Henning	71-69-70-69=279	−5	12,250
T8	(England) Denis Durnian	73-66-74-67=280	−4	9,625
T8	(England) Nick Faldo	68-68-71-73=280	−4	9,625
T8	(Republic of Ireland) Christy O'Connor Jnr	72-69-71-68=280	−4	9,625
T8	(United States) Bill Rogers	67-71-73-69=280	−4	9,625

- The exchange rate at the time was approximately 1.52 dollars (US) per pound sterling.
