= 1965 Open Championship =

Coordinates: 53.622°N 3.033°W

Tournament information
- Dates: 7–9 July 1965
- Location: Southport, England
- Course: Royal Birkdale Golf Club

Statistics
- Par: 73
- Length: 7,037 yards (6,435 m)
- Field: 130 players, 50 after cut
- Cut: 149 (+3)
- Prize fund: £10,000 $28,000
- Winner's share: £1,750 $4,900

Champion
- (Australia) Peter Thomson
- 285 (−7)

Location in England
Location in Southport, Merseyside,
north of Liverpool, England

The 1965 Open Championship was the 94th Open Championship, played 7–9 July at Royal Birkdale Golf Club in Southport, England. Peter Thomson won his fifth Claret Jug, two strokes ahead of runners-up Brian Huggett and Christy O'Connor Snr. Thomson's previous Open victory was seven years earlier in 1958.

The 1965 Open was the last to conclude with two rounds on Friday. Beginning in 1966, the final round was moved from Friday afternoon to Saturday. The Open used this schedule until 1980, when the first round moved to Thursday with the final round on Sunday, the same as the other three majors.

== Field ==
The exemption categories were:

1. The first 20 and those tying for 20th place in the 1964 Open

2. The first 30 and those tying for 30th place in the P.G.A. Order of Merit for 1964

3. The last 10 Open champions (1955–64)

4. The last 5 Amateur champions (1960–64)

5. The last 10 U.S. Open champions (1955–64)

6. The last 5 U.S. Amateur champions (1960–64)

7. The first 30 money winners and those tying for 30th place in the U.S.P.G.A. official list for one year ending with the P.G.A. tournament immediately before the closing date of the U.S. Open entries

8. Members of the 1964 Great Britain and Ireland Eisenhower Cup team

9. Senior professional champions of Great Britain and the United States
Charlie Ward, Sam Snead

10. The 1965 U.S. Open champion
The U.S. Open took place after the final date for entries. The winner, Gary Player, was already exempt.

Qualification took place on 2–3 July at Hillside and Southport and Ainsdale. They were run as two separate events with 41 players to qualify from Hillside, 40 from Southport and Ainsdale, together with 49 exemptions to make a total field of 130. Clive Clark was later added to field after William C. Campbell failed to arrive. M.E. Hill also played after Frank Phillips withdrew.

== Prize money ==
The total prize money was increased from £8,500 to £10,000. The winner's share was increased to £1,750 with £1,250 for second, £1,000 for third, £750 for fourth, £600 for fifth, £450 for sixth, £375 for seventh.

== Course ==
Hole	1	2	3	4	5	6	7	8	9	Out	10	11	12	13	14	15	16	17	18	In	Total
Yards	493	427	416	212	320	468	158	459	410	3,363	393	412	190	517	202	536	401	510	513	3,674	7,037
Par	5	4	4	3	4	4	3	4	4	35	4	4	3	5	3	5	4	5	5	38	73

Lengths of the course for previous Opens:

- 1961: 6,844 yards (6,258 m)
- 1954: 6,867 yards (6,279 m)

== Round summaries ==
=== First round ===
Wednesday, 7 July 1965

Place	Player	Score	To par
1	(United States) Tony Lema	68	−5
2	(Republic of Ireland) Christy O'Connor Snr	69	−4
T3	(Republic of Ireland) Joe Carr (a)	70	−3
T3	(United States) Arnold Palmer	70	−3
5	(Australia) Bruce Devlin	71	−2
T6	(England) Brian Bamford	72	−1
T6	(Scotland) Eric Brown	72	−1
T6	(Republic of Ireland) Christy Greene	72	−1
T6	(England) Ronnie Mandeville	72	−1
T6	(Scotland) Jim McAlister	72	−1
T6	(Spain) Sebastián Miguel	72	−1
T6	(England) Lionel Platts	72	−1
T6	(England) Doug Sewell	72	−1
T6	(England) Guy Wolstenholme	72	−1

=== Second round ===
Thursday, 8 July 1965

Place	Player	Score	To par
T1	(Australia) Bruce Devlin	71-69=140	−6
T1	(United States) Tony Lema	68-72=140	−6
T3	(Wales) Brian Huggett	73-68=141	−5
T3	(United States) Arnold Palmer	70-71=141	−5
T5	(Republic of Ireland) Hugh Boyle	73-69=142	−4
T5	(Scotland) Eric Brown	72-70=142	−4
T5	(Republic of Ireland) Joe Carr (a)	70-72=142	−4
T5	(Republic of Ireland) Christy O'Connor Snr	69-73=142	−4
T5	(Australia) Peter Thomson	74-68=142	−4
10	(Argentina) Roberto De Vicenzo	74-69=143	−3

Amateurs: Carr (-4), Bonallack (+1), Burgess (+1), Clark (+4), Hadlock (+6), Shade (+6),
Foster (+7), Marsh (+7), Glover (+8), Birtwell (+9), Richards (+15), Marks (+17), McCandlish (+17)

=== Third round ===
Friday, 9 July 1965 - (morning)

Place	Player	Score	To par
1	(Australia) Peter Thomson	74-68-72=214	−5
T2	(Australia) Bruce Devlin	71-69-75=215	−4
T2	(United States) Tony Lema	68-72-75=215	−4
T4	(Argentina) Roberto De Vicenzo	74-69-73=216	−3
T4	(Republic of Ireland) Christy O'Connor Snr	69-73-74=216	−3
T4	(United States) Arnold Palmer	70-71-75=216	−3
T7	(Wales) Brian Huggett	73-68-76=217	−2
T7	(Spain) Sebastián Miguel	72-73-72=217	−2
T7	(Australia) Kel Nagle	74-70-73=217	−2
T7	(England) Lionel Platts	72-72-73=217	−2

=== Final round ===
Friday, 9 July 1965 - (afternoon)

Place	Player	Score	To par	Money (£)
1	(Australia) Peter Thomson	74-68-72-71=285	−7	1,750
T2	(Wales) Brian Huggett	73-68-76-70=287	−5	1,125
T2	(Republic of Ireland) Christy O'Connor Snr	69-73-74-71=287	−5	1,125
4	(Argentina) Roberto De Vicenzo	74-69-73-72=288	−4	750
T5	(England) Bernard Hunt	74-74-70-71=289	−3	475
T5	(United States) Tony Lema	68-72-75-74=289	−3	475
T5	(Australia) Kel Nagle	74-70-73-72=289	−3	475
T8	(Australia) Bruce Devlin	71-69-75-75=290	−2	275
T8	(Spain) Sebastián Miguel	72-73-72-73=290	−2	275
T10	(England) Max Faulkner	74-72-74-73=293	+1	185
T10	(Scotland) John Panton	74-74-75-70=293	+1	185

Amateurs: Burgess (+7), Bonallack (+10), Carr (+10)
