= 1961 Open Championship =

Coordinates: 53.622°N 3.033°W

Tournament information
- Dates: 12–15 July 1961
- Location: Southport, England
- Course: Royal Birkdale Golf Club

Statistics
- Par: 72
- Length: 6,844 yards (6,258 m)
- Field: 108 players, 48 after cut
- Cut: 153 (+9)
- Prize fund: £8,500 $23,800
- Winner's share: £1,400 $3,920

Champion
- (United States) Arnold Palmer
- 284 (−4)

Location in England

The 1961 Open Championship was the 90th Open Championship, played 12–15 July at Royal Birkdale Golf Club in Southport, England. Arnold Palmer won the first of two consecutive Open Championships, one stroke ahead of Dai Rees. It was the second Open for Palmer, the runner-up in his first in 1960, and the fourth of his seven major titles. He was the first American to win the Claret Jug since Ben Hogan in 1953. This was the second Open Championship at Royal Birkdale, which hosted in 1954.

Qualifying took place on 10–11 July. Entries played 18 holes on the Championship course and 18 holes at Hillside Golf Club. The number of qualifiers was limited to a maximum of 120. Ties for 120th place would not qualify. The qualifying score was 151 and 108 players qualified. There were 22 players on 152. Bob Charles led the qualifiers on 136, two ahead of Gary Player. A maximum of 50 players could make the cut after 36 holes. Ties for 50th place did not make the cut.

Gale-force winds caused scores to soar during the second round on Thursday, followed by heavy rains which washed out both rounds on Friday. Cancellation was a possibility, but the weather cooperated enough to play the third and fourth rounds in showers on Saturday.

1959 Open champion and reigning Masters champion Gary Player withdrew early in the third round due to a stomach ailment.

== Course layout ==
Hole	1	2	3	4	5	6	7	8	9	Out	10	11	12	13	14	15	16	17	18	In	Total
Yards	520	427	416	212	315	468	158	434	418	3,368	390	368	452	202	517	381	510	186	470	3,476	6,844
Par	5	4	4	3	4	5	3	4	4	36	4	4	4	3	5	4	5	3	4	36	72

== Round summaries ==
=== First round ===
Wednesday, 12 July 1961

Place	Player	Score	To par
T1	(South Africa) Harold Henning	68	−4
T1	(Australia) Kel Nagle	68	−4
T1	(Wales) Dai Rees	68	−4
T4	(France) Jean Garaïalde	69	−3
T4	(England) Norman Johnson	69	−3
T4	(England) David Miller	69	−3
T7	(South Africa) Alan Brookes	70	−2
T7	(England) Neil Coles	70	−2
T7	(England) Sam King	70	−2
T7	(Scotland) John MacDonald	70	−2
T7	(United States) Arnold Palmer	70	−2
T7	(England) Lionel Platts	70	−2

=== Second round ===
Thursday, 13 July 1961

Place	Player	Score	To par
T1	(South Africa) Harold Henning	68-74=142	−2
T1	(Wales) Dai Rees	68-74=142	−2
T3	(Australia) Kel Nagle	68-75=143	−1
T3	(United States) Arnold Palmer	70-73=143	−1
T5	(England) Neil Coles	70-77=147	+3
T5	(England) Sam King	70-77=147	+3
T5	(Spain) Ramón Sota	71-76=147	+3
T5	(Australia) Peter Thomson	75-72=147	+3
T9	(England) Peter Alliss	73-75=148	+4
T9	(England) Ken Bousfield	71-77=148	+4
T9	(Republic of Ireland) Harry Bradshaw	73-75=148	+4
T9	(England) Peter Butler	72-76=148	+4
T9	(England) Eric Lester	71-77=148	+4
T9	(England) David Miller	69-79=148	+4
T9	(Republic of Ireland) Christy O'Connor Snr	71-77=148	+4
T9	(Wales) Dave Thomas	71-77=148	+4
T9	(South Africa) Brian Wilkes	72-76=148	+4

Amateurs: Christmas (+6), White (+6), Chapman (+11), Bonallack (+15), Carr (+17), Reece (+18), Pearson (+25)

=== Third round ===
Saturday, 15 July 1961 - (morning)

Place	Player	Score	To par
1	(United States) Arnold Palmer	70-73-69=212	−4
2	(Wales) Dai Rees	68-74-71=213	−3
3	(Republic of Ireland) Christy O'Connor Snr	71-77-67=215	−1
4	(England) Neil Coles	70-77-69=216	E
T5	(South Africa) Harold Henning	68-74-75=217	+1
T5	(Australia) Peter Thomson	75-72-70=217	+1
7	(Australia) Kel Nagle	68-75-75=218	+2
T8	(Scotland) Eric Brown	73-76-70=219	+3
T8	(England) Norman Johnson	69-80-70=219	+3
T8	(Spain) Ramón Sota	71-76-72=219	+3

=== Final round ===
Saturday, 15 July 1961 - (afternoon)

Place	Player	Score	To par	Money (£)
1	(United States) Arnold Palmer	70-73-69-72=284	−4	1,400
2	(Wales) Dai Rees	68-74-71-72=285	−3	1,000
T3	(England) Neil Coles	70-77-69-72=288	E	710
T3	(Republic of Ireland) Christy O'Connor Snr	71-77-67-73=288	E	710
T5	(Scotland) Eric Brown	73-76-70-70=289	+1	400
T5	(Australia) Kel Nagle	68-75-75-71=289	+1	400
7	(Australia) Peter Thomson	75-72-70-73=290	+2	275
T8	(England) Peter Alliss	73-75-72-71=291	+3	190
T8	(England) Ken Bousfield	71-77-75-68=291	+3	190
T10	(South Africa) Harold Henning	68-74-75-76=293	+5	140
T10	(England) Syd Scott	76-75-71-71=293	+5	140

Amateurs: White (+18), Christmas (+20)
