= Leeds Cup =

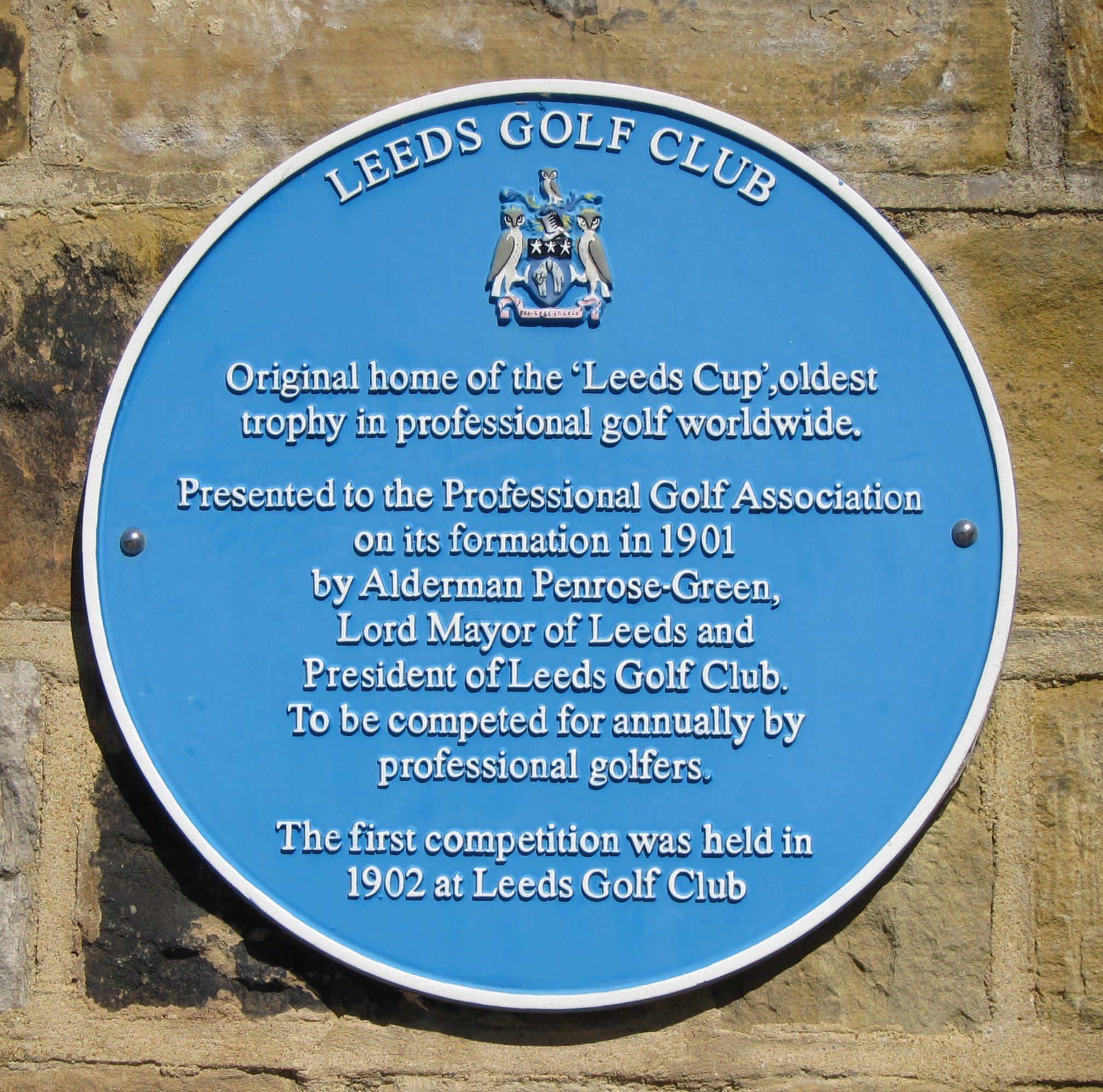
- Plaque on Leeds Golf Club clubhouse where the cup was first played

Tournament information
- Established: 1902
- Course: Leeds Golf Club (2026)

Current champion
- Jordan Loft (2026)

The Leeds Cup is a golf tournament that has been played annually in northern England since 1902. The event is organised by the north region of the Professional Golfers' Association. It is the oldest trophy in professional golf that is still played for. The Tooting Bec Cup is older, having been first played for in 1901, but is no longer contested.

The Leeds Challenge Cup was first contested in May 1902 at Leeds Golf Club. The trophy was presented by Alderman Penrose-Green, Lord Mayor of Leeds and President of Leeds Golf Club to be competed for annually by professional golfers. Harry Vardon was the first winner. 2015 marked the 100th staging of the event.

== History ==
The Northern Counties Professional Golfers' Association was formed as a result of a meeting in Leeds on 9 January 1902. At a subsequent meeting, also in Leeds, on 24 March it was decided that, subject to certain conditions, it would amalgamate with the London-based Professional Golfers' Association and become the northern section of the new enlarged association. The same meeting also agreed to accept an offer from the Leeds Golf Club to host a tournament on 6 May at which the club would provide a prize.

The tournament was contested over 36 holes of stroke play, on a single day. The winner received the Challenge Cup, a memento and the first of six small prizes. There was also a prize for the first apprentice. It was the third tournament organised by the PGA with the Tooting Bec Cup having been contested in October 1901, followed by a tournament at Royal Mid-Surrey Golf Club on 23 April 1902.

The weather on 6 June was wintry and the professionals had to play in a blinding hailstorm which also made putting difficult. 26 professionals entered included three times Open Champions J.H. Taylor and Harry Vardon and Sandy Herd, twice runner-up in the Open. James Braid was absent, having a prior engagement. Vardon won the cup with score of 149, his second round 73 being the best of the day. Herd and Taylor tied for second place on 153. Bertie Snowball, then a young professional at Bradford, won the apprentice prize. 21 of the 26 players returned scores for the two rounds. Mrs Penrose-Green presented the cup to Vardon and Taylor made a short speech thanking the members of the Leeds club.

== Winners ==
Year	Winner	Country	Venue	Score	Margin of victory	Runner(s)-up	Winner's share (£)	Ref
1902	Harry Vardon	Jersey	Leeds Golf Club	149	4 strokes	(Scotland) Sandy Herd (England) J.H. Taylor		
1903	Ted Ray	Jersey	Cleveland Golf Club	147	1 stroke	(Jersey) Harry Vardon		
1904	Sandy Herd	Scotland	Manchester Golf Club	146	1 stroke	(England) Fred Collins (Jersey) Phil Gaudin		
1905	Sandy Herd	Scotland	Bradford Golf Club	145	5 strokes	(England) Fred Leach (England) Bertie Snowball		
1906	George Duncan	Scotland	Wallasey Golf Club	154	5 strokes	(England) Wilfrid Reid		
1907	Ted Ray	Jersey	Ilkley Golf Club	144	1 stroke	(England) Walter Toogood		
1908	Tom Ball	England	Hesketh Golf Club	148	2 strokes	(England) Bill Leaver (Scotland) Tom Watt		
1909	James Kay	England	Harrogate Golf Club	151	1 stroke	(Jersey) Ted Ray		
1910	Ted Ray	Jersey	Chorlton Golf Club	143	4 strokes	(England) George Cawkwell (England) Herbert Riseborough		
1911	Ted Ray	Jersey	Roundhay Golf Club	147	1 stroke	(Jersey) Thomas Renouf		
1912	Peter McEwan Jr.	Scotland	Southport and Ainsdale Golf Club	154	Playoff (18 holes)	(England) George Pulford		
1913	Walter Hambleton	England	Bradford Golf Club	155	Playoff (9 holes)	(Jersey) Tom Beck		
1914	Thomas Renouf	Jersey	Northumberland Golf Club	153	2 strokes	(England) Harry Crapper (England) Charles Roberts (Scotland) Wilfred Thomson		
1915–18: No tournament
1919	Ted Ray	Jersey	Alwoodley Golf Club	158	Playoff (9 holes)	(England) Sam Whiting		
1920	Cyril Hughes	England	West Lancashire Golf Club	152	2 strokes	(England) Syd Wingate		
1921	Arthur Day	England	Ganton Golf Club	147	4 strokes	(England) Walter Bourne (England) Jimmy Johnstone	10	
1922	Jack Gaudin	Jersey	Manchester Golf Club	147	1 stroke	(England) Jerry Bond (England) John Jarman (England) Tom Walton		
1923	Jack Gaudin	Jersey	Hallamshire Golf Club	141	2 strokes	(England) Archie Compston (England) Albert Hallam		
1924	Willie Robertson	England	West Lancashire Golf Club	150	1 stroke	(Jersey) Jack Gaudin (England) Cedric Sayner		
1925	Archie Compston	England	Keighley Golf Club	140	11 strokes	(Jersey) Thomas Renouf		
1926	Archie Compston	England	Harrogate Golf Club	143	Playoff (18 holes)	(England) Cyril Fryer	10	
1927	Robert Leather	England	Manchester Golf Club	150	4 strokes	(England) Cedric Sayner		
1928	D. C. Jones	Wales	Oakdale Golf Club (Harrogate)	146	2 strokes	(England) Bill Davies		
1929	Abe Mitchell	England	North Shore Golf Club	142	1 stroke	(England) Henry Cotton		
1930	D. C. Jones	Wales	Lytham & St Annes Golf Club	148	1 stroke	(England) Jerry Bond (England) Bob Kenyon (England) Bob Porter		
1931	Bill Davies	England	Harrogate Golf Club	137	6 strokes	(Scotland) Allan Dailey (Scotland) Willie McMinn		
1932	Bob Kenyon	England	North Manchester Golf Club	149	Playoff (18 holes)	(England) Fred Taggart		
1933	Ted Jarman	England	Pannal Golf Club	144	Playoff (18 holes)	(Scotland) Jock Ballantine		
1934	Jack Busson	England	Lancaster Golf Club	140	1 stroke	(England) Dick Burton		
1935	Frank Jowle	England	Moor Allerton Golf Club	147	Playoff (18 holes)	(Scotland) John Fallon		
1936	Ted Jarman	England	Morecambe Golf Club	142	3 strokes	(England) Harry Busson (England) Norman Sutton		
1937	John Fallon	Scotland	Mere Golf and Country Club	142	1 stroke	(England) Harry Busson (England) Bert Gadd		
1938	Jack Busson	England	Temple Newsam Golf Club	140	1 stroke	(England) Alf Bignell (England) Harry Busson		
1939	Bill Davies	England	Ormskirk Golf Club	139	1 stroke	(England) Syd Scott		
1940–45: No tournament
1946	Norman Sutton	England	Sand Moor Golf Club	140	5 strokes	(England) Jack Busson		
1947	Eric Green	England	Morecambe Golf Club	135	Playoff (36 holes)	(England) Frank Jowle		
1948	Bill Shankland	Australia	Heysham Golf Club	140	1 stroke	(England) Alf Perry		
1949	John Fallon	Scotland	Reddish Vale Golf Club	137	2 strokes	(England) Bob Kenyon		
1950	Syd Scott	England	Carlisle City Golf Club	148	Playoff (18 holes)	(England) Bob Kenyon		
1951	Norman Sutton	England	Heysham Golf Club	142	Playoff (18 holes)	(England) George Howard		
1952	Syd Scott	England	Worsley Golf Club	145	3 strokes	(England) Bill Branch (England) John Jacobs (England) Ben Shelton		
1953	Syd Scott	England	Harrogate Golf Club	137	2 strokes	(Scotland) John Fallon (England) Ben Shelton		
1954	Bill Branch	England	Blackpool Park Golf Club	138	1 stroke	(Scotland) John Fallon		
1955	Syd Scott	England	Huddersfield Golf Club	146	1 stroke	(South Africa) Gary Player		
1956	Eric Lester	England	Scarcroft Golf Club	136	1 stroke	(England) Syd Scott		
1957–58: Not contested
1959	Tom Fairbairn	England	Rotherham Golf Club	137	2 strokes	(England) Tony Coop		
1960: Not contested
1961	George Parton	England	Southport and Ainsdale Golf Club	142	2 strokes	(South Africa) Harold Henning		
1962	Hedley Muscroft	England	Heysham Golf Club	139	Playoff (5 holes)	(England) Malcolm Hill		
1963: Not contested
1964	Alex Caygill	England						
1965	Tony Coop	England	Manchester Golf Club	141	1 stroke	(England) Mack Gunn (England) Jack Wilkshire		
1966	David Naylor	England	Manchester Golf Club	141	4 strokes	(England) B Allen		
1967	Alex Caygill	England	Manchester Golf Club	140				
1968	Bryon Hutchinson	England	Manchester Golf Club	140	4 strokes	(England) B Allen (England) Fred Boobyer (England) Nigel Casson (a) (England) Jimmy Hume (England) Sandy Wilson		
1969	Bryon Hutchinson	England	Manchester Golf Club	142	1 stroke	(England) Fred Boobyer (England) George Tomlinson		
1970	Hedley Muscroft	England	Leeds Golf Club	139	1 stroke	(England) Bryon Hutchinson		
1971	Bryon Hutchinson	England	Scarcroft Golf Club	135	4 strokes	(England) Mack Gunn		
1972	Bryon Hutchinson	England	Carlisle Golf Club	138	3 strokes	(England) Alex Caygill (Wales) David Vaughan		
1973	Alex Caygill	England	Pontefract Golf Club	138	4 strokes	(England) Mike Ingham (Wales) Lionel Platts		
1974: Not contested
1975	David Dunk	England	Scarcroft Golf Club	136	4 strokes	(England) Ian Mosey		
1976	David Dunk	England	Scarcroft Golf Club	144	Playoff	(England) Brian Evans		

- 1977 Howard Clark
- 1978 Michael Nutter
- 1979 Garry Logan
- 1980 David Jagger
- 1981 Alec Bickerdike
- 1982 Mike Ingham
- 1983 Martin Foster
- 1984 Donald Stirling
- 1985 Bob Longworth
- 1986 Chris Gray
- 1987 Steve Rolley
- 1988 Gordon J. Brand
- 1989 Paul Affleck
- 1990 Donald Stirling
- 1991 Simon Townend
- 1992 Paul Carman
- 1993 Ged Furey
- 1994 Donald Stirling
- 1995 Raife Hutt
- 1996 Mike Archer
- 1997 Peter Scott
- 1998 Neil Price
- 1999 Mike Bradley
- 2000 Phillip Archer
- 2001 Robert Giles
- 2002 Graeme Bell
- 2003 Jonathan Cheetham
- 2004 James Godbold
- 2005 Simon Edwards
- 2006 Neil Price
- 2007 John Wells
- 2008 Scott Barber
- 2009 Chris Clarke
- 2010 Steve Parry
- 2011 David Smith
- 2012 Garry Houston
- 2013 Nick Ludwell
- 2014 Ben Mason
- 2015 Garry Houston
- 2016 Phillip Archer
- 2017 Michael Ramsden
- 2018 Jason Shufflebotham
- 2019 Gareth Davies
- 2020 Haydn McCullen
- 2021 Phillip Archer
- 2022 Phillip Archer
- 2023 Daniel Croft
- 2024 Paul Kinnear
- 2025 Alex Belt
- 2026 Jordan Loft

In 1912 McEwan beat Pulford 78 to 83 in the playoff, played the following day. In 1913 Hambleton beat Beck 40 to 43 in the playoff, played the same evening. In 1919 Ray beat Whiting 40 to 46 in the playoff, played the same evening. In 1926 Compston beat Fryer 72 to 76 in the playoff, played the same evening. In 1932 Kenyon beat Taggart 71 to 74 in the playoff, played the following day. In 1933 Jarman beat Ballantine 72 to 74 in the playoff, played the following day. In 1935 Jowle beat Fallon 72 to 73 in the playoff, played the following day. In 1947 Green beat Jowle 137 to 139 in the playoff, played the following day. In 1950 Scott beat Kenyon 72 to 76 in the playoff, played the same evening. In 1951 Sutton beat Howard 68 to 75 in the playoff, played the same evening.

The 1904 and 1905 contests were the northern section qualifying events for the News of the World Matchplay. From 1911 to 1914 the cup was awarded to the winner of the northern section qualifying competition for the Sphere and Tatler Foursomes Tournament. From 1920 to 1927 and from 1948 to 1950 the cup was awarded to the winner of the northern section qualifying competition for the Daily Mail Tournament. From 1930 to 1939 and in 1946, 1947, 1951, 1955 and 1961 the cup was awarded to the winner of the northern section qualifying competition for the News of the World Matchplay. From 1952 to 1954 the cup was held in connection with qualifying for the Goodwin Foursomes. In 1956 it was held in connection with qualifying for the Goodwin Tournament and similarly in 1959 for the Sherwood Forest Foursomes Tournament.

In 1937 the event was combined with the 72-hole Northern Professional Championship; the Leeds Cup and qualifying for the News of the World Matchplay being based on the first two rounds. Ties for qualifying places were determined by the third round scores in the Northern Professional Championship. The same system was used in 1946 when the Northern Professional Championship was revived. In 1947 the Northern Professional Championship was reduced to 36 holes and the two events were combined. In 1948 the events were again separated with the Leeds Cup being used for the qualifying for the Daily Mail Tournament, the Northern Professional Championship being used for the News of the World Matchplay qualifying. The Daily Mail Tournament was not held in 1951 and the Leeds Cup was contested, as in 1947, at the same time as the Northern Professional Championship.
