= 1906 News of the World Match Play =

Coordinates: 53°5′4″N 1°13′28″W

Tournament information
- Dates: 2–4 October 1906
- Location: Kirkby in Ashfield, Nottinghamshire, England
- Course: Notts Golf Club
- Organised by: The PGA
- Format: Match play – 18 holes (Final 36 holes)

Statistics
- Field: 32 players
- Prize fund: £240
- Winner's share: £100

Champion
- (Scotland) Sandy Herd
- def. Charles Mayo 8 & 7

Location in England

The 1906 News of the World Match Play was the fourth News of the World Match Play tournament. It was played from Tuesday 2 to Thursday 4 October at Notts Golf Club. 32 players competed in a straight knock-out competition, with each match contested over 18 holes, except for the final which was over 36 holes. The winner received £100 out of a total prize fund of £240. Sandy Herd defeated Charles Mayo 8 & 7 in the final to win the tournament.

== Qualification ==
Entry was restricted to members of the Professional Golfers' Association (PGA). Qualification was by a series of 36-hole stroke-play competitions; one for each of the six PGA sections. The Southern section had 16 qualifiers, the Midland and Northern sections had 5 each, the Scottish section 3, the Irish section 2 and the Welsh section 1. In the event of a tie for places there was a playoff.

The qualifiers were:

- Irish section: Harry Kidd, Bertie Snowball
- Midland section: George Cawsey, Jack Fulford, Alfred Lewis, Jack Oke, Walter Tedder
- Northern section: George Duncan, Sandy Herd, Ted Ray, Thomas Renouf, Charles Roberts
- Southern section: James Braid, Arthur Catlin, Harry Chestney, Willie Hunter, Sr., Rowland Jones, Fred Leach, Charles Mayo, Wilfrid Reid, Herbert Riseborough, James Sherlock, Ralph Smith, David Stephenson, J.H. Taylor, Alfred Toogood, Harry Vardon, Tom Vardon
- Scottish section: Andrew Grant, Ben Sayers, Robert Thomson
- Welsh section: Jack Ross

== Format ==
The format was unchanged. Matches were over 18 holes except for the final which was over 36 holes. Extra holes were played in the event of a tied match. Two rounds were played on the first day, two more on the second day with the final on the third day.

== Results ==
First round 2 October
(England) Bertie Snowball	2&1
(Scotland) Willie Hunter, Sr.
(Scotland) Robert Thomson	4&3
(England) Alfred Lewis
(Jersey) Tom Vardon
(Jersey) Harry Vardon	2up
(Scotland) Sandy Herd	3&2
(Scotland) Ben Sayers
(England) Jack Fulford	4&2
(England) Fred Leach
(England) J.H. Taylor	7&6
(England) Walter Tedder
(Scotland) George Duncan	3&2
(Scotland) James Braid
(England) Charles Roberts	w/o
(Scotland) David Stephenson
(England) Alfred Toogood
(England) Herbert Riseborough	4&2
(England) Harry Chestney
(England) James Sherlock	4&3
(Scotland) Jack Ross
(Scotland) Ralph Smith	5&4
(England) Rowland Jones	4&3
(Scotland) Andrew Grant
(Jersey) Ted Ray
(England) Arthur Catlin	4&3
(England) Wilfrid Reid	3&2
(Ireland) Harry Kidd
(England) Jack Oke
(England) Charles Mayo	3&1
(England) George Cawsey	3&2
(Jersey) Thomas Renouf

Second round 2 October
(England) Bertie Snowball
(Scotland) Robert Thomson	1up
(Jersey) Harry Vardon
(Scotland) Sandy Herd	2up
(England) Jack Fulford
(England) J.H. Taylor	5&4
(Scotland) George Duncan	4&3
(England) Charles Roberts
(England) Herbert Riseborough	6&5
(England) James Sherlock
(Scotland) Ralph Smith
(England) Rowland Jones	6&4
(England) Arthur Catlin
(England) Wilfrid Reid	4&3
(England) Charles Mayo	21h
(England) George Cawsey

Third round 3 October
(Scotland) Robert Thomson
(Scotland) Sandy Herd	5&3
(England) J.H. Taylor
(Scotland) George Duncan	1up
(England) Herbert Riseborough
(England) Rowland Jones	4&2
(England) Wilfrid Reid
(England) Charles Mayo	2&1

Semi-finals; 3 October
(Scotland) Sandy Herd	6&5
(Scotland) George Duncan
(England) Rowland Jones
(England) Charles Mayo	2&1

Final; 4 October
(Scotland) Sandy Herd	8&7
(England) Charles Mayo

w/o = Walkover

== Prize money ==
The winner received £100 and a gold medal, the runner-up £30 and a silver medal, the losing semi-finalists £15 and a bronze medal, while the third round losers received £10 and the second round losers received £5.
