= 1908 News of the World Match Play =

Sixth News of the World Match Play golf tournament

Coordinates: 51°28′8″N 0°18′46″W

Tournament information
- Dates: 6–8 October 1908
- Location: Richmond, London, England
- Course: Mid-Surrey Golf Club
- Organised by: The PGA
- Format: Match play – 18 holes (Final 36 holes)

Statistics
- Field: 32 players
- Prize fund: £240
- Winner's share: £100

Champion
- (England) J.H. Taylor
- def. Fred Robson 2 up

Location in England

The 1908 News of the World Match Play was the sixth News of the World Match Play tournament. It was played from Tuesday 6 to Thursday 8 October at Mid-Surrey Golf Club. 32 players competed in a straight knock-out competition, with each match contested over 18 holes, except for the final which was over 36 holes. The winner received £100 out of a total prize fund of £240. J.H. Taylor defeated Fred Robson by 2 holes in the final to win the tournament.

== Qualification ==
Entry was restricted to members of the Professional Golfers' Association (PGA). Qualification was by a series of 36-hole stroke-play competitions; one for each of the six PGA sections. The Southern section had 14 qualifiers, the Northern section 7, the Midland and the Scottish sections 4, the Irish section 2 and the Welsh section 1. Compared to 1907 there was one extra qualifier for the Northern section and one less for Welsh section. In the event of a tie for places there was a playoff.

The qualifiers were:

- Irish section: James Edmundson, Harry Kidd
- Midland section: Willie Aveston, George Coburn, Jack Oke, Tom Williamson
- Northern section: Tom Ball, Tom Beck, Sandy Herd, Ted Ray, Thomas Renouf, Fred Robson, Tom Watt
- Southern section: James Batley, James Bradbeer, James Braid, Ernest Gray, Rowland Jones, Arnaud Massy, Charles Mayo, Jack Rowe, James Sherlock, J.H. Taylor, Albert Tingey, Sr., Harry Vardon, Tom Vardon, Reg Wilson
- Scottish section: Willie Binnie, Willie Fernie, Charles Neaves, Ben Sayers
- Welsh section: Syd Ball

== Format ==
The format was unchanged. Matches were over 18 holes except for the final which was over 36 holes. Extra holes were played in the event of a tied match. Two rounds were played on the first day, two more on the second day with the final on the third day.

== Results ==
First round 6 October
(Jersey) Harry Vardon	7&6
(Scotland) Charles Neaves
(England) Jack Rowe
(England) Jack Oke	1up
(Jersey) Tom Beck
(England) Charles Mayo	6&5
(England) Reg Wilson
(England) Tom Williamson	4&2
(England) Syd Ball
(Scotland) Ben Sayers	3&2
(Scotland) Sandy Herd
(Jersey) Tom Vardon	19h
(England) Fred Robson	3&2
(England) Albert Tingey, Sr.
(England) Tom Ball	4&3
(France) Arnaud Massy
(Scotland) Tom Watt
(England) Rowland Jones	1up
(Scotland) Willie Fernie
(England) James Sherlock	w/o
(Wales) Willie Aveston
(Ireland) Harry Kidd	3&2
(Scotland) George Coburn
(Jersey) Thomas Renouf	5&4
(England) J.H. Taylor	2&1
(Scotland) James Braid
(Jersey) Ted Ray	3&1
(England) James Batley
(Ireland) James Edmundson
(England) Ernest Gray	2&1
(Scotland) Willie Binnie	3&1
(England) James Bradbeer

Second round 6 October
(Jersey) Harry Vardon	3&1
(England) Jack Oke
(England) Charles Mayo	4&2
(England) Tom Williamson
(Scotland) Ben Sayers	2&1
(Jersey) Tom Vardon
(England) Fred Robson	2&1
(England) Tom Ball
(England) Rowland Jones
(England) James Sherlock	4&3
(Ireland) Harry Kidd
(Jersey) Thomas Renouf	5&3
(England) J.H. Taylor	2up
(Jersey) Ted Ray
(England) Ernest Gray	2&1
(Scotland) Willie Binnie

Third round 7 October
(Jersey) Harry Vardon
(England) Charles Mayo	4&3
(Scotland) Ben Sayers
(England) Fred Robson	1up
(England) James Sherlock	1up
(Jersey) Thomas Renouf
(England) J.H. Taylor	3&1
(England) Ernest Gray

Semi-finals; 7 October
(England) Charles Mayo
(England) Fred Robson	3&1
(England) James Sherlock
(England) J.H. Taylor	3&2

Final; 8 October
(England) Fred Robson
(England) J.H. Taylor	2up

w/o = Walkover

== Prize money ==
The winner received £100 and a gold medal, the runner-up £30 and a silver medal, the losing semi-finalists £15 and a bronze medal, while the third round losers received £10 and the second round losers received £5.
