= 1907 News of the World Match Play =

Fifth News of the World Match Play golf tournament

Coordinates: 51°23′17″N 0°37′52″W

Tournament information
- Dates: 15–17 October 1907
- Location: Sunningdale, Berkshire, England
- Course: Sunningdale Golf Club
- Organised by: The PGA
- Format: Match play – 18 holes (Final 36 holes)

Statistics
- Field: 32 players
- Prize fund: £240
- Winner's share: £100

Champion
- (Scotland) James Braid
- def. J.H. Taylor 4 & 2

Location in England

The 1907 News of the World Match Play was the fifth News of the World Match Play tournament. It was played from Tuesday 15 to Thursday 17 October at Sunningdale Golf Club. 32 players competed in a straight knock-out competition, with each match contested over 18 holes, except for the final which was over 36 holes. The winner received £100 out of a total prize fund of £240. James Braid defeated J.H. Taylor 4 & 2 in the final to win the tournament.

== Qualification ==
Entry was restricted to members of the Professional Golfers' Association (PGA). Qualification was by a series of 36-hole stroke-play competitions; one for each of the six PGA sections. The number of entries from each section were adjusted. The Southern section had 14 qualifiers, the Northern section 6, the Midland and the Scottish sections 4 and the Irish and Welsh sections 2. In the event of a tie for places there was a playoff.

The qualifiers were:

- Irish section: James Edmundson, Charlie Pope
- Midland section: George Coburn, Alfred Lewis, Jack Oke, Tom Williamson
- Northern section: George Duncan, Sandy Herd, Bill Leaver, George Pulford, Ted Ray, Charles Roberts
- Southern section: Albert Bellworthy, James Bradbeer, James Braid, Ernest Gaudin, Ernest Gray, Rowland Jones, Anthony Kettley, James Kinnell, Charles Mayo, Bob McKenzie, Arthur Mitchell, James Sherlock, J.H. Taylor, Harry Vardon
- Scottish section: Tom Drummond, Alex Marling, Robert Thomson, Tom Watt
- Welsh section: Jack Ross, Sam Whiting

== Format ==
The format was unchanged. Matches were over 18 holes except for the final which was over 36 holes. Extra holes were played in the event of a tied match. Two rounds were played on the first day, two more on the second day with the final on the third day.

== Results ==
First round 15 October
(Scotland) James Kinnell	20h
(Scotland) Tom Watt
(Scotland) Alex Marling
(England) Charlie Pope	7&5
(England) Alfred Lewis
(England) Tom Williamson	2&1
(Jersey) Ted Ray	2&1
(England) Rowland Jones
(Scotland) Jack Ross
(Scotland) Sandy Herd	4&3
(Ireland) James Edmundson	3&2
(England) Sam Whiting
(England) Ernest Gray	2&1
(England) James Bradbeer
(Scotland) James Braid	3&1
(Scotland) George Coburn
(England) Anthony Kettley
(Scotland) Robert Thomson	6&5
(England) J.H. Taylor	5&4
(Jersey) Ernest Gaudin
(England) James Sherlock	6&5
(England) Charles Roberts
(Scotland) Bob McKenzie
(England) Arthur Mitchell	3&1
(Scotland) Tom Drummond
(England) Bill Leaver	2&1
(Scotland) George Duncan
(England) Charles Mayo	5&4
(England) George Pulford	w/o
(England) Albert Bellworthy
(Jersey) Harry Vardon	4&3
(England) Jack Oke

Second round 15 October
(Scotland) James Kinnell
(England) Charlie Pope	4&2
(England) Tom Williamson
(Jersey) Ted Ray	20h
(Scotland) Sandy Herd
(Ireland) James Edmundson	2&1
(England) Ernest Gray
(Scotland) James Braid	6&4
(Scotland) Robert Thomson
(England) J.H. Taylor	3&2
(England) James Sherlock	1up
(England) Arthur Mitchell
(England) Bill Leaver
(England) Charles Mayo	2&1
(England) George Pulford
(Jersey) Harry Vardon	4&3

Third round 16 October
(England) Charlie Pope
(Jersey) Ted Ray	4&3
(Ireland) James Edmundson
(Scotland) James Braid	6&5
(England) J.H. Taylor	2up
(England) James Sherlock
(England) Charles Mayo
(Jersey) Harry Vardon	6&5

Semi-finals; 16 October
(Jersey) Ted Ray
(Scotland) James Braid	4&3
(England) J.H. Taylor	1up
(Jersey) Harry Vardon

Final; 17 October
(Scotland) James Braid	4&2
(England) J.H. Taylor

w/o = Walkover

== Prize money ==
The winner received £100 and a gold medal, the runner-up £30 and a silver medal, the losing semi-finalists £15 and a bronze medal, while the third round losers received £10 and the second round losers received £5.
