= 1913 News of the World Match Play =

Eleventh News of the World Match Play golf tournament

Coordinates: 51°16′40″N 0°14′45″W

Tournament information
- Dates: 7–9 October 1913
- Location: Walton-on-the-Hill, Surrey, England
- Course: Walton Heath Golf Club
- Organised by: The PGA
- Format: Match play – 18 holes (Final 36 holes)

Statistics
- Field: 32 players
- Prize fund: £400
- Winner's share: £100

Champion
- (Scotland) George Duncan
- def. James Braid 3 & 2

Location in England

The 1913 News of the World Match Play was the eleventh News of the World Match Play tournament. It was played from Tuesday 7 to Thursday 9 October at Walton Heath Golf Club. 32 players competed in a straight knock-out competition, with each match contested over 18 holes, except for the final which was over 36 holes. The winner received £100 out of a total prize fund of £400. George Duncan defeated James Braid 3 & 2 in the final to win the tournament. This was Braid's fifth final but the first time he had been beaten.

== Qualification ==
Entry was restricted to members of the Professional Golfers' Association (PGA). Qualification was by a series of 36-hole stroke-play competitions; one for each of the eight PGA sections. The Southern section had 12 qualifiers, the Northern section 7, the Midland section 5, the Scottish, Welsh and Western sections 2 and the Eastern and Irish sections 1. Because of the large number of entries in the Southern section, two events were run with 6 qualifiers at each venue. In the event of a tie for places there was a playoff.

Harry Vardon and Ted Ray, the 1912 finalists, were in the US and did not enter.

Qualifying events:

- 10 July Western section at Came Down: Ernest Whitcombe won by 3 strokes on 155. Charles Whitcombe and Henry Shutt tied for second place on 158 but Whitcombe won the 9-hole playoff 45 to 46.
- 23 July Eastern section at Brancaster: Ernest Riseborough won by 3 strokes on 160.
- 3 September Northern section at St Anne's Old Links: Sam Whiting won by 1 stroke on 147. Tom Brace, Peter Rainford and Thomas Renouf tied on 151 and played off the next day for two places. Renouf with 73 and Rainford 77 qualified, while Brace scored 80.
- 11 September Irish section at Royal County Down: Michael Moran won by 2 strokes on 152.
- 17 September Midland section at Little Aston: George Tuck won by 1 stroke on 153. The event was also the 1913 Midland Professional Championship.
- 17 September Southern section at Bramshot: George Duncan won by 2 strokes on 145.
- 17 September Southern section at Burhill: Laurie Ayton, Snr won by 2 strokes on 139.
- 18 September Scottish section at Carnoustie: Peter Robertson and Willie Watt tied on 151.
- 24 September Welsh section at Bangor: Harry Ball won by 4 strokes on 147.

The qualifiers were:

- Western section: Charles Whitcombe, Ernest Whitcombe
- Eastern section: Ernest Riseborough
- Northern section: Bill Davies, Arthur Day, James Douglas Edgar, Peter Rainford, Thomas Renouf, Harry Simpson, Sam Whiting
- Irish section: Michael Moran
- Midland section: George Buckle, Harry Cawsey, George Tuck, Edward Veness, Dick Wheildon
- Southern section at Bramshot Golf Club: Tom Ball, James Bradbeer, James Braid, George Duncan, Fred Leach, Willie Ritchie
- Southern section at Burhill Golf Club: Laurie Ayton, Snr, James Batley, Jean Gassiat, Charles Mayo, Jack B. Ross, Reg Wilson
- Scottish section: Peter Robertson, Willie Watt
- Welsh section: Harry Ball, George Gadd

Sandy Herd, J.H. Taylor and James Sherlock failed to qualify from the Southern section. So the only previous winners competing were Tom Ball and James Braid.

== Format ==
The format was unchanged. Matches were over 18 holes except for the final which was over 36 holes. Extra holes were played in the event of a tied match. Two rounds were played on the first day, two more on the second day with the final on the third day.

== Results ==
First round 7 October
(England) Sam Whiting
(Scotland) Peter Robertson	6&5
(England) Bill Davies
(England) Fred Leach	2&1
(England) Dick Wheildon
(England) Reg Wilson	3&2
(England) Harry Cawsey	4&2
(Jersey) Thomas Renouf
(England) Charles Whitcombe	19h
(England) Arthur Day
(Scotland) Willie Ritchie
(Scotland) George Duncan	2&1
(Scotland) Jack B. Ross
(England) George Gadd	1up
(England) Tom Ball
(England) Ernest Whitcombe	1up
(England) Charles Mayo	5&4
(England) Peter Rainford
(England) James Bradbeer	20h
(Ireland) Michael Moran
(England) Harry Simpson
(Scotland) James Braid	4&3
(England) Harry Ball
(England) James Batley	5&4
(England) Ernest Riseborough	2&1
(England) George Buckle
(Scotland) Willie Watt	1up
(England) J. Douglas Edgar
(England) George Tuck
(England) Edward Veness	1up
(France) Jean Gassiat
(Scotland) Laurie Ayton, Snr	2&1

Second round 7 October
(Scotland) Peter Robertson
(England) Fred Leach	19h
(England) Reg Wilson	2&1
(England) Harry Cawsey
(England) Charles Whitcombe
(Scotland) George Duncan	2up
(England) George Gadd
(England) Ernest Whitcombe	2up
(England) Charles Mayo	1up
(England) James Bradbeer
(Scotland) James Braid	3&1
(England) James Batley
(England) Ernest Riseborough
(Scotland) Willie Watt	4&2
(England) Edward Veness
(Scotland) Laurie Ayton, Snr	3&2

Third round 8 October
(England) Fred Leach
(England) Reg Wilson	3&2
(Scotland) George Duncan	3&1
(England) Ernest Whitcombe
(England) Charles Mayo
(Scotland) James Braid	3&2
(Scotland) Willie Watt	2&1
(Scotland) Laurie Ayton, Snr

Semi-finals; 8 October
(England) Reg Wilson
(Scotland) George Duncan	4&3
(Scotland) James Braid	3&2
(Scotland) Willie Watt

Final; 9 October
(Scotland) George Duncan	3&2
(Scotland) James Braid

== Prize money ==
The winner received £100 and a gold medal, but the runner-up now received £40 and a silver medal, losing semi-finalists £20 and a bronze medal, losing quarter-finalists £15, second round losers £10 and first round losers £5.
