= Willie Gaudin =

British professional golfer

Personal information
- Full name: William Charles Gaudin
- Nationality: Jersey
- Born: 24 May 1874 Grouville, Jersey
- Died: 31 August 1921 (aged 47) Manhattan, New York City, United States

Career
- Sport: Golf
- Status: Professional

Best results in major championships
- Masters Tournament: DNP
- PGA Championship: DNP
- U.S. Open: T30: 1907
- The Open Championship: 33: 1901

William Charles Gaudin (24 May 1874 – 31 August 1921) was a professional golfer from Jersey. Gaudin had four younger brothers who were also professional golfers, Jack, Phil, Ernest and Herbert.

== Golf career ==
Gaudin was an assistant to Tom Vardon at Ilkley Golf Club in the mid-1890s and was also a frequent playing companion of Harry Vardon, Tom's brother. When he played in the 1897 Open Championship his club is given as Doncaster. In 1899 he was the professional at Bradford Golf Club when it moved from Baildon to Hawksworth. In 1903 he moved from Bradford to the new Scarborough Town Club (now Scarborough South Cliff) with his assistant Bertie Snowball. In 1905 Gaudin and Snowball moved to Royal Portrush Golf Club but the appointment was short-lived since Gaudin emigrated later the same year.

Gaudin arrived in New York City in late 1905 and became the professional at Dutchess Golf Club near Poughkeepsie, New York, for 1906. He played in the 1907 U.S. Open at the Philadelphia Cricket Club and was tied for 30th place.

== Death ==
Gaudin died of tuberculosis in a New York City sanatorium in August 1921 aged 47 leaving a wife and five children.

== Results in major championships ==
Tournament	1897	1898	1899	1900	1901	1902	1903	1904	1905	1906	1907
The Open Championship	WD		CUT	WD	33	T38		T41			
U.S. Open											T30

Note: Gaudin only played in The Open Championship and the U.S. Open.

Did not play

CUT = missed the cut
WD = withdrew
"T" indicates a tie for a place
