= Bertie Snowball =

English professional golfer (1887–1915)

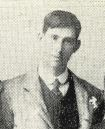
- Snowball, c. 1907

Personal information
- Nationality: England
- Born: 7 May 1887 Baildon, Yorkshire, England
- Died: 9 May 1915 (aged 28) Aubers Ridge, near Neuve-Chapelle, France
- Spouse: Maria Cox
- Children: 3

Career
- Sport: Golf
- Status: Professional

Best results in major championships
- Masters Tournament: DNP
- PGA Championship: DNP
- U.S. Open: DNP
- The Open Championship: T38: 1906

Bertie Snowball (7 May 1887 – 9 May 1915) was an English professional golfer who played in the early 20th century. He was at his peak as a player from 1904 to 1908 but was still competitive as late as 1914. He was killed in 1915 during World War I.

During his short career he was a professional in all four Home Nations, being connected with Bradford, Scarborough Town, Blankney, Royal Portrush, Portmarnock, Scarborough North Cliff, and Criccieth before moving finally to Carnoustie. He was runner-up in the Leeds Cup, twice made the cut in the Open Championship, twice qualified for the final stages of the News of the World Match Play, was twice runner-up in the Irish Professional Championship and was good enough to beat Harry Vardon in a match in 1905, before his 18th birthday.

== Early life ==
Snowball was born 7 May 1887 at Baildon, Yorkshire, England, to James Snowball (a farm bailiff) and Elizabeth (Hannah) Sotheran who had married in 1870. The Snowball family was a large one, Bertie having a number of brothers and sisters. His father later became a greenkeeper at the Scarborough Town golf club.

== Golf career ==
=== Professional in England ===
Snowball played in the first Leeds Cup on 6 May 1902, the day before his 15th birthday, and won the prize for the first assistant (then described as "apprentice"). He was described as "a promising young golfer attached to the Bradford Club at Hawksworth." He won the assistant prize the following year too, then attached to the newly formed Scarborough Town club (now Scarborough South Cliff). He failed to achieve a hat-trick of success in 1904 when Ernest Gaudin won the prize. In late July 1904 he set a new course record for the Scarborough Town course when he posted a score of 69, one better than the previous record set by the professional Willie Gaudin. The score would have been even better but he missed short putts at the 15th, 16th and 17th, taking 5 at each of the holes, the only 5s on his card.

Within weeks of this course record Snowball had his first position as a full professional, at the newly formed Blankney Golf Club. At the official opening of the course in late August 1904, Snowball, "who has been appointed professional of the Blankney Club", played an afternoon foursomes match partnered with Willie Gaudin. This appointment seems to have been short lived since he soon returned to Scarborough Town. His knowledge of the Blankney course was, however, useful when he convincingly beat Harry Vardon 4 and 3 in a match there in early 1905. He played in the Leeds Cup competition again in July 1905, held at Bradford Golf Club. He scored 150 in the 36-hole event and was the runner-up five strokes behind Scotsman Sandy Herd.

=== Professional in Ireland ===
The 1905 Leeds Cup tournament had served as a qualifying event for the News of the World Match Play tournament. In the final stages at Walton Heath Golf Club in early October, Snowball was now representing Royal Portrush Golf Club. In July that year the Scarborough Town professional, Willie Gaudin, left for a new appointment at Royal Portrush and Snowball joined him there, presumably as an assistant. The Times reported that Snowball was "a promising Scarborough player who has just secured a position at Portrush" In his last-32 match Snowball lost narrowly to Tom Vardon, Harry's brother.

Snowball played in the 1906 Open Championship at Muirfield in June, by which time he was the professional at Portmarnock Golf Club. Snowball just made the cut after two rounds, on 163. His four rounds over the Muirfield course were 83-80-78-81=322 and he finished tied for 38th place. Now in the Irish section of the PGA he gained one of the two places for the 1906 News of the World Match Play finals at Notts Golf Club, finishing second in the qualifying event at Royal Dublin. In the finals, Snowball won his last-32 match but lost his last-16 match at the 18th hole.

He played in the first Irish Professional Championship contested on 20 and 21 May 1907 at Royal Portrush Golf Club. The tall Yorkshireman got through to the 18-hole final but lost there to James Edmundson. Snowball was all square after 9 holes but Edmundson won the next three holes and eventually won the match by the score of 2 and 1. Prior to the championship Snowball had played in an international match for Ireland against a weak Scottish team. He entered the 1907 Open but did not qualify.

Snowball and Edmundson locked horns again in the 1908 Irish PGA Championship played from 13 to 15 May at Portmarnock Golf Club when they were paired in the 36-hole final which Edmundson won comfortably 5 and 3 after being 4 up after 18 holes. At Prestwick in the 1908 Open he qualified with rounds of 82 and 79 and then posted rounds of 85-84-80-82=331 to finish in 54th place. Snowball left Portmarnock soon afterwards since news of his replacement, James McKenna, were reported in August.

=== Return to England ===
After leaving Portmarnock because of ill-health Snowball returned to Scarborough, was married to Maria Cox in 1909, and was involved in the creation of the North Cliff course and was the club's first professional. Snowball played an exhibition match on the opening day of the course, Easter Monday 1910. However, immediately afterwards he severed his relationship with the club for reasons unknown. In early 1911 Snowball was appointed the professional at Criccieth club in Wales.

=== Professional in Wales ===
Snowball made an immediate impact at Criccieth scoring a course record 66, three shots better than the previous mark. He was professional there for about three years before moving to Scotland.

=== Professional in Scotland ===
In early 1914 Snowball moved to Carnoustie working for Bob Simpson, a noted club maker. During his period there he regularly played in competitions.

== Family ==
Snowball and his wife Maria had three children. She returned to Scarborough after Bertie's death. His elder brother, Arthur, was also a golf professional having been posted at Portmarnock and later at Ballybunion Golf Club.

== Death and legacy ==
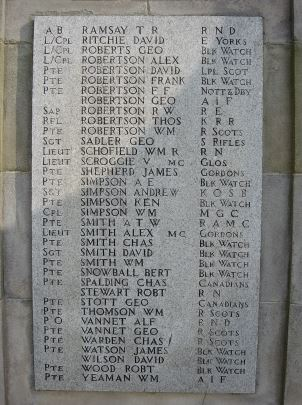
The Carnoustie War Memorial

Snowball was killed in action in World War I in France, near Flanders in the Battle of Aubers Ridge on 9 May 1915, while serving as a corporal with the Black Watch (Royal Highlanders), 5th Battalion. The report of the battle read in part: "Poor Bertie Snowball, a letter had to be opened to get his young wife's address".

As it turned out, the battle was an unmitigated disaster for the British army. No ground was won and no tactical advantage gained. The battle likely had no positive effect on assisting the main French attack 15 miles (24 km) to the south.

His final resting place was at Le Trou Aid Post Cemetery, Fleurbaix near Armentières. Snowball's name, along with 35 other Carnoustie soldiers who perished in the war, is engraved on the Carnoustie War Memorial. His name also appears on the Westow War Memorial, the village where his parents are buried, and on a memorial panel in St Marys Church, Scarborough.

On 1 January 1917 some benefit matches were arranged to raise money for the widows of Snowball and Andrew Simpson, another Carnoustie golfer who had died in action in France. Because of the wet state of the ground only 14 holes were played.
