= Tom Walton (golfer) =

English golfer (1891–1941)

Personal information
- Full name: Thomas Walton
- Nationality: England
- Born: 1891 St Anne's-on-the-Sea, Lancashire, England
- Died: 2 August 1941 (aged 50) Leamington Spa, Warwickshire, England

Career
- Sport: Golf
- Status: Professional

Best results in major championships
- Masters Tournament: DNP
- PGA Championship: DNP
- U.S. Open: DNP
- The Open Championship: T8: 1922

Thomas Walton (1891 – 2 August 1941) was an English professional golfer. His best performance in the Open Championship was a tie for 8th place in 1922, his first appearance. He was runner-up in the 1923 Daily Dispatch Northern Professional Championship behind Abe Mitchell.

== Early life ==
Walton was born in 1891 in St Anne's-on-the-Sea, Lancashire, England.

== Golf career ==
Walton played in the St Annes Old Links Tournament in June 1919, representing Lytham & St Annes Golf Club, and finished tied for 12th place with four rounds of 77.

Walton was one of the runners-up in the 1922 Leeds Cup at Manchester Golf Club, a shot behind Jack Gaudin. In his first qualifying round in the 1922 Open Championship, playing at Prince's, he did the first 9 holes in 34. Although he came back in 40, his rounds of 74 and 77 put him well up amongst the qualifiers. Rounds of 75 and 78 on the first day of the Championship put him in a tie for 5th place. Two rounds of 77 on the final day left him tied for 8th place. He shared the 8th and 9th place prize money with Harry Vardon, each taking home £6 5s.

In the 1923 Daily Dispatch Northern Professional Championship at Lytham & St Annes, Walton finished tied for third place with Herbert Gaudin and behind two Americans, Gene Sarazen and Walter Hagen. He finished one better in the 1925 event, being runner-up, 2 strokes behind Abe Mitchell. The 1925 event was again held at his home club.

In April 1927 Walton moved from Royal Lytham to the Leamington & County Golf Club, where he remained until his death.

== Death ==
Walton died at his home in Leamington Spa, Warwickshire on 2 August 1941 aged 50. He had been ill for some time. He left a wife and three children.

== Results in major championships ==
Tournament	1922	1923	1924	1925	1926	1927	1928
The Open Championship	T8	T19	39	T32			CUT

Note: Walton only played in The Open Championship.

Top 10
Did not play

CUT = missed the half-way cut
"T" indicates a tie for a place
