= 1905 News of the World Match Play =

Third News of the World Match Play golf tournament

Coordinates: 51°16′40″N 0°14′45″W

Tournament information
- Dates: 3–5 October 1905
- Location: Walton-on-the-Hill, Surrey, England
- Course: Walton Heath Golf Club
- Organised by: The PGA
- Format: Match play – 18 holes (Final 36 holes)

Statistics
- Field: 32 players
- Prize fund: £240
- Winner's share: £100

Champion
- (Scotland) James Braid
- def. Tom Vardon 4 & 3

Location in England

The 1905 News of the World Match Play was the third News of the World Match Play tournament. It was played from Tuesday 3 to Thursday 5 October at Walton Heath Golf Club. 32 players competed in a straight knock-out competition, with each match contested over 18 holes, except for the final which was over 36 holes. The winner received £100 out of a total prize fund of £240. James Braid defeated Tom Vardon 4 & 3 in the final to win the tournament.

== Qualification ==
Entry was restricted to members of the Professional Golfers' Association (PGA). Qualification was by a series of 36-hole stroke-play competitions; one for each of the six PGA sections. The Southern section had 16 qualifiers, the Midland and Northern sections had 5 each, the Scottish section 3, the Irish section 2 and the Welsh section 1. In the event of a tie for places there was a playoff. Compared to 1904 one entry was allocated to the new Welsh section with the number of qualifiers from the Northern section being reduced to five.

The qualifiers were:

- Irish section: Tom Hood, Fred Smyth
- Midland section: George Cawsey, John Hutchings, Willie Lewis, Billy Whiting, Tom Williamson
- Northern section: George Duncan, Sandy Herd, Percy Hills, David McEwan, Bertie Snowball
- Southern section: James Braid, George Carter, Harry Cawsey, James Hepburn, Rowland Jones, Arthur Mitchell, Wilfrid Reid, Ernest Riseborough, Jack Rowe, Ralph Smith, J.H. Taylor, Alfred Toogood, Harry Vardon, Tom Vardon, William Webb, Jack White
- Scottish section: Jock Hutchison, Andrew Kirkaldy, Arnaud Massy
- Welsh section: Fred Collins

== Format ==
The format was unchanged. Matches were over 18 holes except for the final which was over 36 holes. Extra holes were played in the event of a tied match. Two rounds were played on the first day, two more on the second day with the final on the third day.

== Results ==
First round 3 October
(Scotland) Ralph Smith
(England) Willie Lewis	1up
(England) Fred Collins	scr
(France) Arnaud Massy	scr
(England) John Hutchings
(England) Rowland Jones	9&7
(Jersey) Harry Vardon	4&3
(England) William Webb
(Scotland) Sandy Herd
(Scotland) James Braid	19h
(England) Harry Cawsey	3&2
(England) George Cawsey
(Scotland) Jack White
(England) Jack Rowe	1up
(England) Billy Whiting
(England) Tom Williamson	19h
(Scotland) Jock Hutchison	4&2
(Scotland) David McEwan
(England) Alfred Toogood	6&4
(Scotland) Tom Hood
(Scotland) James Hepburn
(Scotland) George Duncan	3&2
(England) Bertie Snowball
(Jersey) Tom Vardon	1up
(England) Ernest Riseborough
(England) J.H. Taylor	2up
(England) George Carter	w/o
(Scotland) Andrew Kirkaldy
(England) Percy Hills
(England) Arthur Mitchell	1up
(Ireland) Fred Smyth	3&1
(England) Wilfrid Reid

Second round 3 October
(England) Willie Lewis	w/o
(England) Rowland Jones	1up
(Jersey) Harry Vardon
(Scotland) James Braid	5&4
(England) Harry Cawsey
(England) Jack Rowe	19h
(England) Tom Williamson
(Scotland) Jock Hutchison	3&2
(England) Alfred Toogood
(Scotland) George Duncan
(Jersey) Tom Vardon	1up
(England) J.H. Taylor	2&1
(England) George Carter
(England) Arthur Mitchell	1up
(Ireland) Fred Smyth

Third round 4 October
(England) Willie Lewis
(England) Rowland Jones	2&1
(Scotland) James Braid	6&4
(England) Jack Rowe
(Scotland) Jock Hutchison
(Jersey) Tom Vardon	6&5
(England) J.H. Taylor
(England) Arthur Mitchell	2&1

Semi-finals; 4 October
(England) Rowland Jones
(Scotland) James Braid	4&3
(Jersey) Tom Vardon	1up
(England) Arthur Mitchell

Final; 5 October
(Scotland) James Braid	4&3
(Jersey) Tom Vardon

w/o = Walk over
scr = Scratched

== Prize money ==
The winner received £100 and a gold medal, the runner-up £30 and a silver medal, the losing semi-finalists £15 and a bronze medal, while the third round losers received £10 and the second round losers received £5.
