= Ryder Tournament =

Tournament information
- Location: St Albans, England
- Established: 1928
- Course(s): Verulam Golf Club
- Month played: July
- Final year: 1928

Final champion
- Bill Davies and Abe Mitchell

Location in England

The Ryder Tournament was a professional golf tournament played at Verulam Golf Club in St Albans, England and sponsored by Samuel Ryder. The event was held just once, in 1928, and had total prize money of £500.

The tournament was played over two days, 11 and 12 July, with 36 holes of stroke play each day. The tournament was restricted to the first 24 British professionals in the 1928 Open Championship. The players had to be resident in Britain. The Times noted that it was "in the nature of a British Close Championship".

== History ==
The field consisted of the 24 professionals scoring 314 or better in the Open. The field was Alf Bradbeer, Stewart Burns, Henry Cotton, Bill Davies, George Duncan, Gus Faulkner, George Gadd, Willie Holley, Herbert Jolly, Arthur Lacey, Duncan McCulloch, Abe Mitchell, James Ockenden, Ted Ray, Fred Robson, Jack Smith, Fred Taggart, Bill Twine, Reg Whitcombe, Albert Whiting, Tom Williamson, Reg Wilson, Syd Wingate, Arthur Young.

Archie Compston was also eligible to play but was in America at the time. Other than him, all the eligible professionals played in the event. Two other notable players of the period, Percy Alliss and Aubrey Boomer, were not resident in Britain so were ineligible.

Bill Davies led after the first day on 142, a stroke ahead of Abe Mitchell and two ahead of George Gadd. Davies was out in 31 in his first round and finished with 69, despite a 4 at the short 17th hole. Mitchell and George Duncan also scored 69s in their afternoon rounds.

Mitchell and Duncan both had 69s again in their third rounds. Mitchell then led, with Duncan second and Davies third after a 74. In the final round Duncan dropped back after a 77. Davies holed a 5-foot putt on the last hole to finish on 287. A little later, Mitchell also holed a difficult putt on the final green to share the honours. George Gadd and Tom Williamson tied for third place, 4 shots behind, with Duncan fifth.

The tournament was played in unusually hot weather which had made the ground very hard.

The tournament was originally planned to be an annual event but was not repeated.

== Winners ==
Year	Winner	Country	Venue	Score	Margin of victory	Winner's share (£)	Ref
1928	Bill Davies	England	Verulam Golf Club	287	Tie	75 each	
1928	Abe Mitchell	England	Verulam Golf Club	287	Tie	75 each	
