= Walter Toogood =

English professional golfer (1874–1914)

Personal information
- Full name: Walter George Toogood
- Nationality: England
- Born: 1874 Ryde, Isle of Wight
- Died: 13 October 1914 (aged 40) Carisbrooke, Isle of Wight

Career
- Sport: Golf
- Turned professional: c. 1894

Best results in major championships
- Masters Tournament: DNP
- PGA Championship: DNP
- U.S. Open: DNP
- The Open Championship: T13: 1907

Walter George Toogood (1874 – 13 October 1914) was an English professional golfer who played in the late 19th century into the early 20th century. He was a consistent performer in the Open Championships where he posted a number of top-20 finishes. His best result came in 1907 when he finished 13th.

== Early life ==
Toogood was born in Ryde on the Isle of Wight in 1874, but his family moved across the island to St Helens when he was quite young. He was the son of Frank Toogood and Lucy Ann Barton. He was one of a number of near-contemporaries who learnt their golf at the now-defunct Royal Isle of Wight Golf Club, near St Helens, and went on to become successful tournament golfers. The group included a cousin, Alfred, as well as Rowland Jones and Horace Rawlins.

== Golf career ==
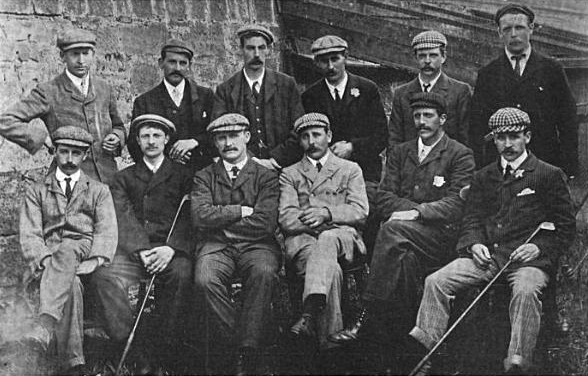
A group photo of the 1903 England team. Toogood is seated far left.

Toogood was appointed professional at Eltham Warren Golf Club in south London in 1895 replacing his cousin. Toogood was then appointed the professional at Rochford Hundred Golf Club in Essex when it opened in early 1897 and remained there until moving to Ilkley Golf Club in West Yorkshire, England, in early 1903 where he served as the head professional from 1903 until 1911.

He was a frequent competitor in the Open Championship. His first start came in 1895 and he last played in 1911. Toogood played in the England–Scotland Professional Match—representing England—in 1903 and 1907. Toogood was runner-up in the 1907 Leeds Cup. He led after the first round with a 71 but after an afternoon 74 he finished second to Ted Ray. He shared the prize with Ray for the lowest round of the day.

=== 1907 Open Championship ===
The 1907 Open Championship was held 20–21 June at Royal Liverpool Golf Club in Hoylake, England. Arnaud Massy, from France, won the Championship, two strokes ahead of runner-up J.H. Taylor. Toogood started very strongly and was tied for 7th place after two rounds of play, carding rounds of 76 and 86 and finishing on 162. He eventually finished the tournament in 13th place.

In early 1911 Toogood left Ilkley to become the professional at Alwoodley Golf Club on the north side of Leeds.

== Illness and death ==
On Friday 1 March 1912, Toogood was found in a semi-conscious state, by a stranger, face down in a field in the Upper Malone district near Belfast. The circumstances which led him to this location and condition were not known. Toogood had been given permission to be absent from Alwoodley Golf Club to go to Preston, Lancashire, on the Thursday and was to have returned the same day. He had been suffering from depression. When found Toogood was in possession of a number of items including a gold watch and chain. Attached to the chain was a gold medal with the words "England v Scotland 1903 W G Toogood" inscribed on it. Toogood made something of a recovery and returned to Yorkshire. However, his condition then became critical and he gave up his post at Alwoodley.

By November 1912, he had recovered somewhat and it was reported that he would be the professional at the new Camberley Heath Golf Club. There was a long delay in taking up the post since he did not take up his position until late 1913. The course was officially opened on 1 January 1914 with two exhibition matches. In the morning Toogood was partnered with Prince Albert Christian of Schleswig-Holstein and in the afternoon with Jack White, the Sunningdale professional. The appointment was short-lived since Toogood resigned only a few days after the course opened.

Toogood returned to the Isle of Wight where he died, unmarried, on 13 October 1914 in the County Lunatic Asylum in Carisbrooke at the age of 40. He was buried in St Helens.

== Results in major championships ==
Tournament	1895	1896	1897	1898	1899	1900	1901	1902	1903	1904	1905	1906	1907	1908	1909	1910	1911
The Open Championship	T27	22	26	T19	20	CUT	28	T20	WD	CUT	T28	T15	T13	T18		37	CUT

Note: Toogood only played in The Open Championship.

Did not play

CUT = missed the half-way cut
WD = withdrew T= tied

== Team appearances ==
- England–Scotland Professional Match (representing England): 1903, 1907 (winners)
