= Phil Gaudin =

British professional golfer (born 1879)

- Gaudin (center), who hit first, watches J. H. Taylor tee off in their match in June 1906 celebrating the opening of the Fulwell Golf Course.

Personal information
- Full name: Phillip John Gaudin
- Nationality: Jersey; United States
- Born: 4 March 1879 Grouville, Jersey; Channel Islands
- Spouse: Eliza F. Kell
- Children: 2

Career
- Sport: Golf
- Status: Professional
- Professional wins: 1

Best results in major championships
- Masters Tournament: DNP
- PGA Championship: T17: 1922
- U.S. Open: DNP
- The Open Championship: T8: 1914

Phillip John Gaudin (born 4 March 1879) was a professional golfer from Jersey who played in the late 19th and early 20th century. He had three top-10 finishes in the Open Championship. His best result was a tie for eighth place in the 1914 Open Championship. He tied for ninth place in both the 1901 and 1908 Open Championships.

== Early life ==
Gaudin was born 4 March 1879 in Grouville, Jersey, Channel Islands. He married in 1908 to Eliza Frances Kell and the couple had two daughters, Iris and Alice. He emigrated to the United States in 1916. Gaudin had four brothers who were also professional golfers, his older brothers Willie and Jack and younger brothers Ernest and Herbert.

== Golf career ==
In 1905, Gaudin was posted as the professional at Trafford Park Golf Club in Manchester, England, where he won an open competition with two fine cards of 72-69=141. By 1906 Gaudin was the professional at Fulwell Golf Club, Hampton Hill, England, and he remained there until the start of World War I in 1914. When the Fulwell course first opened in June 1906, Gaudin played a match there against J. H. Taylor who had designed the Fulwell course. By January 1919 he was professional at the Onwentsia Club and taught golf at an indoor school in Chicago during the winter months. He later moved to Skokie Country Club in 1920.

In a 36-hole match played on 21 August 1920 at Skokie Country Club, Gaudin paired up with Chick Evans against the touring British duo of Ted Ray and Harry Vardon. Playing in a steady rain, Evans' play for the first 18 holes was wild and ineffective, but Gaudin carried the day with steady play by carding a 74 which gave the Americans a 3 up advantage at the midway point in the match. Evans managed to resurrect his game on the first nine holes of the second round by shooting a 34 which gave he and Gaudin an insurmountable lead. They ended up finishing off the British players, whose play was described as "erratic", by the score of 6 and 5. At the time, Gaudin was serving as the head professional at Skokie Country Club which hosted the U.S. Open in 1922.

On 11 March 1921, Gaudin and his wife sailed from Liverpool bound for Quebec, Canada, aboard the RMS Empress of France. Their ship's manifest indicated that the couple's final destination was Chicago, Illinois. Gaudin was returning to the United States after an apparent visit or vacation in England.

On the morning of 22 July 1921 Gaudin was paired with Kenneth Edwards, an Olympic gold medal winner in golf at the 1904 Summer Olympics, in a foursomes match against Chick Evans and Warren Wood at the Riverside Club in Indianapolis. It is unclear what the result of the match was, but Evans shot a 4-under-par 70 and the match was said by Evans to be "successful". In another match at the public course at Lincoln Park on 19 August, Jock Hutchison and Gaudin took on Evans and Wood—the latter also being an Olympic gold medal winner in the 1904 Summer Olympics—in a match that was attended by a throng of 2,000 spectators. Sailors from the nearby Naval Station Great Lakes had been tasked to hold the ropes to control the huge crowd that had gathered to follow the match.

=== 1901 Open Championship ===
The 1901 Open Championship was held 5–6 June at Muirfield in Gullane, East Lothian, Scotland. Gaudin, who finished the tournament tied for ninth place, carded rounds of 86-81-86-76=329. Surprisingly, he was not awarded any prize money. James Braid won the Championship.

=== 1908 Open Championship ===
The 1908 Open Championship was held 18–19 June at Prestwick Golf Club in Prestwick, South Ayrshire, Scotland. Gaudin fired rounds of 77-76-75-80=308 and tied for ninth place with the French professional Arnaud Massy. No prize money was won by either player. James Braid won the tournament with rounds of 70-72-77-72=291.

=== 1914 Open Championship ===
In the 1914 Open Championship, played on 18–19 June at Prestwick Golf Club, Gaudin maneuvered his way around the course with rounds of 78-83-80-74=315. The final round 74 was particularly useful in helping him take home £5 in prize money. Due to World War I, it was the last Open for six years; the next playing of the Open would not occur until 1920.

=== 1922 PGA Championship ===
Gaudin was a contestant in the 1922 PGA Championship. He started off by winning his opening match 3 and 2 against T. K. Manley, but lost in the round of 32 by the score of 8 and 7 against Johnny Golden.

=== Leeds Cup ===
Gaudin competed in the 1904 Leeds Cup Tournament, finishing runner-up to Sandy Herd at Manchester Golf Club.

=== Tooting Bec Cup ===
Gaudin won the 1912 Tooting Bec Cup Tournament contested at Royal Mid-Surrey Golf Club in Old Deer Park in Richmond, southwest London. He beat James Braid in an 18-hole playoff.

== Death and legacy ==
Gaudin's date of death is unknown. He is best remembered for having three top-10 finishes in the Open Championship.

== Results in the major championships ==
Tournament	1899	1900	1901	1902	1903	1904	1905	1906	1907	1908	1909
The Open Championship	WD	T22	T9	CUT		T24	CUT	T19	11	T9	T48

Tournament	1910	1911	1912	1913	1914	1915	1916	1917	1918	1919	1920	1921	1922
The Open Championship	T12		23		T8	NT	NT	NT	NT	NT			
PGA Championship	NYF	NYF	NYF	NYF	NYF	NYF		NT	NT				R32

Note: Gaudin played only in The Open Championship and the PGA Championship.

Top 10
Did not play

NYF = Tournament not yet founded
NT = No tournament
WD = Withdrew
CUT = missed the half-way cut
"T" indicates a tie for a place
R32, R16, QF, SF = Round in which player lost in PGA Championship match play

== Team appearances ==
- England–Scotland Professional Match (representing England): 1905 (tie), 1906 (winners), 1907 (winners), 1909 (winners), 1912 (tie), 1913 (winners)
