= Harry Simpson (golfer) =

English golfer (1885–1955)

Personal information
- Full name: Harry B. Simpson
- Nationality: England
- Born: 1885 Ganton, Yorkshire, England
- Died: 7 November 1955 (aged 70) Blackpool, Lancashire, England

Career
- Sport: Golf
- Status: Professional

Best results in major championships
- Masters Tournament: DNP
- PGA Championship: DNP
- U.S. Open: DNP
- The Open Championship: 3rd: 1914

Harry B. Simpson (1885 – 7 November 1955) was an English professional golfer. He finished third in the 1914 Open Championship.

== Early life ==
Simpson was born in Ganton, Yorkshire in 1885. He learnt his golf at Ganton Golf Club where Harry Vardon was the professional. Simpson had an older brother, Tom, and a younger brother, Amos, who were also professional golfers.

== Golf career ==
Simpson was at Anson Golf Club, Manchester from 1903 to 1905 and then at Warrington, Lytham and Fairhaven before moving to St Anne’s Old Links in 1911.

Simpson had a brief period as a successful tournament golfer, making an impact in 1913 and 1914. In 1913 he qualified for the Sphere and Tatler Foursomes Tournament, the Open Championship and News of the World Match Play. He also played a number of exhibition matches during the year. In 1914 he again qualified for the Sphere and Tatler Foursomes Tournament and the Open, where he qualified in a tie for 13th place. On the first day on the Open, Simpson had rounds of 80 and 77 to be in a tie for 13th place. Final day rounds of 78 and 75 lifted him into third place behind Harry Vardon and J. H. Taylor.

Simpson returned to St Anne’s Old Links after the war and stayed until 1924.

== Results in major championships ==
Tournament	1905	1906	1907	1908	1909	1910	1911	1912	1913	1914
The Open Championship	CUT								T39	3

Note: Simpson only played in The Open Championship.

Top 10
Did not play

CUT = missed the half-way cut
"T" indicates a tie for a place
