= Herbert Gaudin =

British professional golfer

Personal information
- Full name: Herbert Arthur Gaudin
- Nationality: Jersey
- Born: 6 October 1886 Grouville, Jersey
- Died: 1945 (aged 58) Jersey

Career
- Sport: Golf
- Status: Professional

Best results in major championships
- Masters Tournament: DNP
- PGA Championship: DNP
- U.S. Open: DNP
- The Open Championship: T11: 1926

Herbert Arthur Gaudin (6 October 1886 – 1945) was a professional golfer from Jersey.

== Golf career ==
Gaudin had four older brothers who were also professional golfers, Willie, Jack, Phil and Ernest. Unlike his brothers, Herbert spent most of his adult life on Jersey, except for a period from 1926 to 1934 when he was at Wanstead.

In the 1923 Daily Dispatch Northern Professional Championship at Lytham & St Annes Golf Club, Gaudin finished tied for third place with local professional Tom Walton and behind two Americans, Gene Sarazen and Walter Hagen. In his third round Gaudin went round in 67 and won a special £100 prize for beating the previous course record of 68. He also won £25 for the best round of the tournament and £25 for the best round by an ex-serviceman as well as his prize money for finishing third. Gaudin was 13th in the 1925 Open Championship and tied for 11th the following year.

Gaudin was the professional golfer of the Royal Jersey Golf Club from 1904 to 1926. He then became the professional golfer at Wanstead Golf Club after the departure of Percy Alliss but retired because of ill-health in 1934 and was succeeded by Allan Dailey.

== Death ==
Gaudin returned to Jersey and died in early 1945 during the German occupation of the Channel Islands.

== Results in major championships ==
Tournament	1910	1911	1912	1913	1914	1915	1916	1917	1918	1919
The Open Championship	T50				61	NT	NT	NT	NT	NT

Tournament	1920	1921	1922	1923	1924	1925	1926	1927	1928	1929
The Open Championship				T35		13	T11			CUT

Note: Gaudin only played in The Open Championship.

Did not play

NT = No tournament
CUT = missed the half-way cut
"T" indicates a tie for a place
