= Fred Leach (golfer) =

English professional golfer

Personal information
- Nationality: England
- Born: 1885 Baildon, Yorkshire, England
- Died: Unknown

Career
- Sport: Golf
- Status: Professional

Best results in major championships
- Masters Tournament: DNP
- PGA Championship: DNP
- U.S. Open: DNP
- The Open Championship: T6: 1921

Fred Leach (1885–?) was an English professional golfer. His best performance in the Open Championship, the only major tournament he played in, was a tie for 6th place in 1921. His final score was only six shots shy of the pace set by Jock Hutchison and Roger Wethered who tied for first place and went to a playoff in which Hutchison prevailed.

== Biography ==
Leach was born in 1885 in Baildon, Yorkshire, England.

He was an assistant at Bradford Golf Club and while there was the second placed assistant in the 1903 Leeds Cup behind Bertie Snowball. Soon afterwards he moved south and became an assistant to William Fulford at Northwood Golf Club. Leach was joint runner-up in the 1905 Leeds Cup, played at his old club at Bradford, five strokes behind Sandy Herd and tied with Bertie Snowball.

He was at Northwood for 21 years before moving to Highwoods Golf Club at Bexhill-on-Sea when that course opened in 1925 and then became professional at Royal Wimbledon Golf Club from 1926 to 1950, where he replaced William's nephew Jack Fulford.

Leach tied for 6th place in the 1921 Open Championship and reached the final of the 1922 News of the World Match Play at Sunningdale Golf Club, losing 5&4 to George Gadd.

== Results in major championships ==
Tournament	1905	1906	1907	1908	1909
The Open Championship	?	T47			

Tournament	1910	1911	1912	1913	1914	1915	1916	1917	1918	1919
The Open Championship	?	T27	T17	T42	T21	NT	NT	NT	NT	NT

Tournament	1920	1921	1922	1923	1924	1925	1926	1927	1928
The Open Championship	T29	T6	T36	70	T22				CUT

Top 10
Did not play

NT = No tournament
CUT = missed the half-way cut
? = finish unknown
"T" indicates a tie for a place
