= Alwoodley Golf Club =

Golf course in Leeds

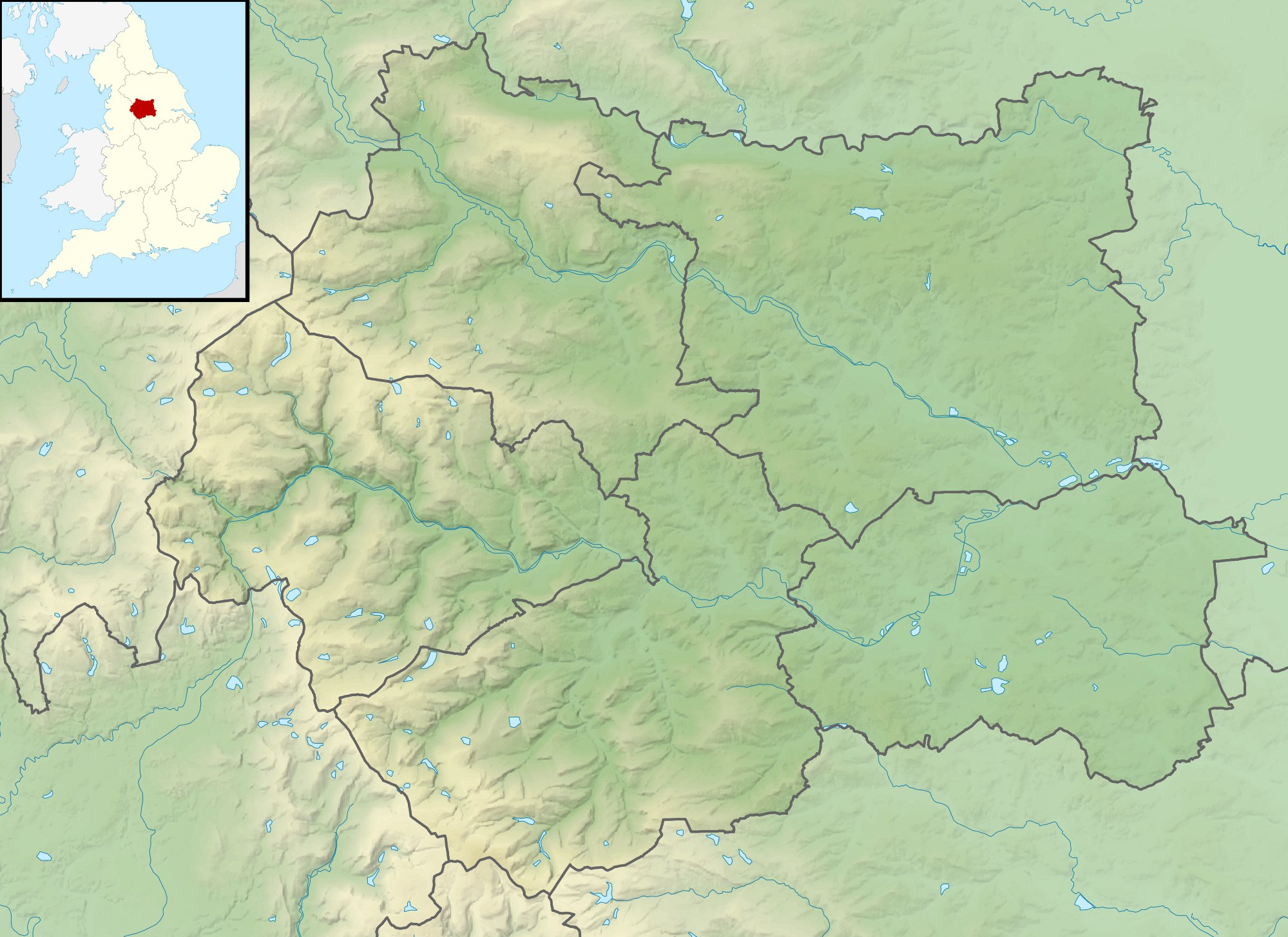
- Location in England Location in West Yorkshire Location in Leeds
- 53.862°N 1.525°W

Club information
- Location: Alwoodley, West Yorkshire, England
- Established: 1907
- Type: Private
- Tota holes: 18
- Tournaments: Leeds Cup (1919); English Amateur (2003, 2015); Brabazon Trophy (2019); Women's Amateur Championship (1971, 2007)
- Website: alwoodleygolfclub.com
- Designed by: Alister MacKenzie
- Par: 71
- Length: 6,914 yards (6,322 m)
- Course rating: 73.9
- Slope rating: 138
- Course record: 63 Harry Hall (2019)

Alwoodley Golf Club is a golf club located in Alwoodley, North Leeds, West Yorkshire, England. It was founded in 1907. The 18-hole golf course was the first to be designed by renowned architect, Alister MacKenzie. It is recognised as one of the best inland heathland courses in England.

== History ==
Alwoodley Golf Club was founded in 1907 by members of the Leeds Club, a gentlemen's club in Albion Place in Leeds. Secretary of the club was Alister MacKenzie. The golf course, constructed on part of the Harewood estate known as Wigton Moor, was the first that he designed; he would go on to design many more and become one of the world's most renowned golf course architects.

Walter Toogood was the club professional at Alwoodley from 1911 until 1912, when he resigned due to ill health. His replacement was Jack Gaudin, who remained at the club for 34 years until his retirement in 1946.

== Major tournaments hosted ==
Alwoodley has hosted many important professional and elite amateur tournaments, including the Leeds Cup (1919), English Amateur in 2003 and 2015, the Brabazon Trophy in 2019, the Women's Amateur Championship in 1971 and 2007, the English Women's Amateur Championship in 1967 and 1987, the English Women's Open Amateur Stroke Play Championship in 2011, and the Weetabix Challenge Trophy (2001). Alwoodley has also been an Open Championship Regional Qualifying venue.

== Golf course ==
=== Course records ===
The course record was set in 2019 by former Walker Cup player Harry Hall, who carded a round of 63 during the Brabazon Trophy in 2019. His round bettered the previous course record by one shot which was set the previous year by Stiggy Hodgson during Regional Qualifying for the 2018 Open Championship.

=== Scorecard ===
Alwoodley Golf Club
Tee	Rating/Slope	1	2	3	4	5	6	7	8	9	Out	10	11	12	13	14	15	16	17	18	In	Total
Par	Blue (men)	4	4	5	4	4	4	3	5	3	36	5	3	4	4	3	4	4	4	4	35	71
Blue	73.9 / 138	404	305	514	479	370	456	141	591	235	3495	528	176	365	403	205	409	414	435	484	3419	6914
Par	White (men)	4	4	5	5	4	4	3	5	3	37	5	3	4	4	3	4	4	4	4	35	72
White	72.6 / 136	404	305	514	479	370	422	141	544	191	3370	482	166	365	395	205	409	414	435	447	3318	6688
Par	Yellow (men)	4	4	5	4	4	4	3	5	3	36	4	3	4	4	3	4	4	4	4	34	70
Yellow	71.0 / 130	388	295	489	454	345	391	141	496	186	3185	459	148	346	383	179	381	402	413	440	3151	6336
Par	Red (women)	4	4	5	5	4	4	3	5	3	37	4	3	4	4	3	4	5	4	5	36	73
Red	73.5 / 135	369	248	396	395	315	325	128	456	179	2811	363	135	334	342	147	338	378	349	382	2768	5579
