= Ernest Gaudin =

British professional golfer

Personal information
- Full name: Ernest Philippe Gaudin
- Nationality: Jersey
- Born: 1882 Grouville, Jersey
- Died: August 1911 (aged 28) Ryton, County Durham, England

Career
- Sport: Golf
- Status: Professional

Best results in major championships
- Masters Tournament: DNP
- PGA Championship: DNP
- U.S. Open: DNP
- The Open Championship: T8: 1910

Ernest Philippe Gaudin (1882 – August 1911) was a professional golfer from Jersey. Gaudin had four brothers who were also professional golfers: his older brothers Willie, Jack and Phil, along with his younger brother Herbert.

== Golf career ==
Gaudin's best season was 1910 when he tied for 8th place in the Open Championship when he carded rounds of 78-74-76-81=309. He was also one of the runners-up in the Tooting Bec Cup. Gaudin has been joint leader in the Tooting Bec Cup after a first-round 74.

Gaudin joined his brother Willie at Manchester Golf Club in about 1903, becoming an assistant professional. In 1906 Ernest moved south to Fulwell Golf Club in Twickenham. In 1907 he moved to Felixstowe Golf Club, to Worplesdon Golf Club in 1908 and finally to Tyneside Golf Club in 1911.

== Death ==
Gaudin died of pneumonia in August 1911 in Ryton, County Durham, England—at the young age of just 28—soon after taking the position at Tyneside.

== Results in major championships ==
Tournament	1907	1908	1909	1910	1911
The Open Championship	T38		T14	T8	WD

Note: Gaudin only played in The Open Championship.

Top 10
Did not play

WD = Withdrew
"T" indicates a tie for a place
