= Bert Seymour =

English golfer (1887–1970)

Personal information
- Full name: Albert Victor George Seymour
- Nationality: England
- Born: 23 February 1887 Wimbledon, London, England
- Died: 1970 (aged 83) Ipswich, Suffolk, England

Career
- Sport: Golf
- Turned professional: 1908
- Professional wins: 1

Best results in major championships
- Masters Tournament: DNP
- PGA Championship: DNP
- U.S. Open: DNP
- The Open Championship: T39: 1914

Albert Victor George Seymour (23 February 1887 – 1970) was an English professional golfer. He had some success after World War I and won the 1921 News of the World Match Play.

== Golf career ==
Seymour was the professional at Molesey Hurst Golf Club from 1908 to 1921.

Seymour had reached the final stages of the 1919 News of the World Match Play, losing to the eventual winner Abe Mitchell at the last 32 stage. He qualified again for the final stages in 1920 and reached the semi-final, losing again to Mitchell, who won for the second year in succession. In 1921 he qualified through a 36-hole event and won 6 matches to win the title. He met Jack Gaudin in the 36-hole final. Gaudin missed a three-foot putt at the last and the match went to extra holes. Seymour missed short putts at the second and third extra holes and eventually won the match with another short putt at the 40th hole. He won £200 for his victory while Gaudin took home £50.

== Professional wins ==
- 1921 News of the World Match Play

== Results in major championships ==
Tournament	1911	1912	1913	1914	1915	1916	1917	1918	1919	1920	1921	1922	1923	1924
The Open Championship	CUT			T39	NT	NT	NT	NT	NT		T74		T74	T65

Note: Seymour only played in The Open Championship.

Top 10
Did not play

NT = No tournament
CUT = missed the half-way cut
"T" indicates a tie for a place
