= 1922 Open Championship =

Coordinates: 51.274°N 1.367°E

Tournament information
- Dates: 22–23 June 1922
- Location: Sandwich, England
- Course: Royal St George's Golf Club

Statistics
- Field: 80 players
- Cut: none
- Prize fund: £200
- Winner's share: £75

Champion
- (United States) Walter Hagen
- 300

Location in England
Location in Kent. England

The 1922 Open Championship was the 57th Open Championship, played 22–23 June at Royal St George's Golf Club in Sandwich, England. Walter Hagen became the first American-born winner of the Open Championship, one stroke ahead of runners-up Jim Barnes and George Duncan. It was the first of Hagen's four Open Championships and the fourth of his eleven major titles.

Qualifying took place on 19–20 June, Monday and Tuesday, with 18 holes at St. George's and 18 holes at Prince's; the top eighty and ties qualified. Hagen and Joe Kirkwood led the field on 147; the qualifying score was 161 and exactly 80 players advanced. Wednesday was an idle day, which included a driving contest.

Hagen, the winner over Barnes in the PGA Championship finals in 1921, was the 36-hole leader at 149, two strokes ahead of Duncan, Barnes, and five-time champion J.H. Taylor. In the two-day format, there was not a cut after 36 holes.

In the third round on Friday morning, defending champion Jock Hutchison shot 73 and moved to the lead, one shot ahead of Taylor and Jean Gassiat, and two shots over Hagen and Barnes. Despite a seven on the fourth hole, Hutchison carded a 36 on the front nine of the final round, but a 40 on the final nine led to a 76 and a fourth-place finish in his second and last Open.

Hagen and Barnes battled for the championship, but Barnes' 73 was one off Hagen's 72, his lowest round of the championship. Duncan, the 1920 champion, shot an 81 in the third round and fell six strokes back into a tie for tenth, then rebounded with a 69 in the afternoon to climb the leaderboard and tie Barnes for second. Taylor and Gassiat shot high scores in the final round and dropped to sixth and seventh, respectively.

For the final time, two members of the Great Triumvirate finished in the top-10 at the Open Championship; Taylor, age 51, finished sixth and six-time champion Harry Vardon, age 52, tied for eighth. The third member, James Braid, missed qualifying on Tuesday by a stroke.

== Round summaries ==
=== First round ===
Thursday, 22 June 1922 (morning)

Place	Player	Score
T1	(Jersey) Ted Ray	73
T1	(England) J.H. Taylor	73
3	(England) Gus Faulkner	74
T4	(England) Percy Alliss	75
T4	(England) Jim Barnes	75
T4	(Jersey) Aubrey Boomer	75
T4	(France) Jean Gassiat	75
T4	(England) Fred Jewell	75
T4	(England) Alfred Miles	75
T4	(England) Tom Walton	75
T4	(England) Reg Wilson	75

=== Second round ===
Thursday, 22 June 1922 (afternoon)

Place	Player	Score
1	(United States) Walter Hagen	76-73=149
T2	(England) Jim Barnes	75-76=151
T2	(Scotland) George Duncan	76-75=151
T2	(England) J.H. Taylor	73-78=151
T5	(England) Percy Alliss	75-78=153
T5	(France) Jean Gassiat	75-78=153
T5	(United States) Jock Hutchison	79-74=153
T5	(England) Tom Walton	75-78=153
T9	(England) Charles Johns	78-76=154
T9	(England) Roger Wethered (a)	76-78=154

=== Third round ===
Friday, 23 June 1922 (morning)

Place	Player	Score
1	(United States) Jock Hutchison	79-74-73=226
T2	(England) J.H. Taylor	73-78-76=227
T2	(France) Jean Gassiat	75-78-74=227
T4	(England) Jim Barnes	75-76-77=228
T4	(United States) Walter Hagen	76-73-79=228
T4	(England) Charles Whitcombe	77-79-72=228
7	(England) Tom Walton	75-78-77=230
T8	(England) Percy Alliss	75-78-78=231
T8	(Jersey) Aubrey Boomer	75-80-76=231
T10	(Scotland) George Duncan	76-75-81=232
T10	(Jersey) Harry Vardon	79-79-74=232
T10	(England) Ernest Whitcombe	77-78-77=232

=== Final round ===
Friday, 23 June 1922 (afternoon)

Place	Player	Score	Money (£)
1	(United States) Walter Hagen	76-73-79-72=300	75
T2	(England) Jim Barnes	75-76-77-73=301	32; 10s
T2	(Scotland) George Duncan	76-75-81-69=301	32; 10s
4	(United States) Jock Hutchison	79-74-73-76=302	15
5	(England) Charles Whitcombe	77-79-72-75=303	10
6	(England) J.H. Taylor	73-78-76-77=304	10
7	(France) Jean Gassiat	75-78-74-79=306	7 10s
T8	(Jersey) Harry Vardon	79-79-74-75=307	6; 5s
T8	(England) Tom Walton	75-78-77-77=307	6; 5s
10	(England) Percy Alliss	75-78-78-77=308	5
