= Fulwell Golf Course =

Golf course in London, England

- Fulwell Golf Course

- Fulwell Golf Course
- 51°26′00.01″N 0°21′07.60″W

Club information
- Location: Fulwell
- Established: 1904
- Owner: London Borough of Richmond upon Thames
- Operator: Fulwell Golf Club
- Tota holes: 18
- Website: www.fulwellgolfclub.co.uk
- Designed by: J.H. Taylor; Alister MacKenzie; John S. F. Morrison
- Par: 71
- Length: 6,491 yards (5,935 m)

Fulwell Golf Course, operated by Fulwell Golf Club, is a 241 acres (98 ha) golf course and centre comprising an 18-hole course located in Fulwell in the London Borough of Richmond upon Thames, west London. It is adjacent to the 9-hole Twickenham Golf Course, currently operated by a David Lloyd Club, which was separated from the original Fulwell Golf Course in the 1950s. Both courses are located on Metropolitan Open Land owned by, and leased from, the London Borough of Richmond Upon Thames.

== Location ==
The combined site comprising Fulwell and Twickenham golf courses, the David Lloyd Club, allotments, and Squires Garden Centre is bounded by the A305 Staines Road to the northwest, the B358 Sixth Cross Road to the north, the A312 Uxbridge Road and Burton Road to the southwest, and part of the Shepperton branch railway line and A311 Wellington Road to the east where the main entrance to Fulwell Golf Club is situated. Fulwell railway station is a short walk from Fulwell Golf Club's entrance.

== History ==
=== Fulwell Park ===
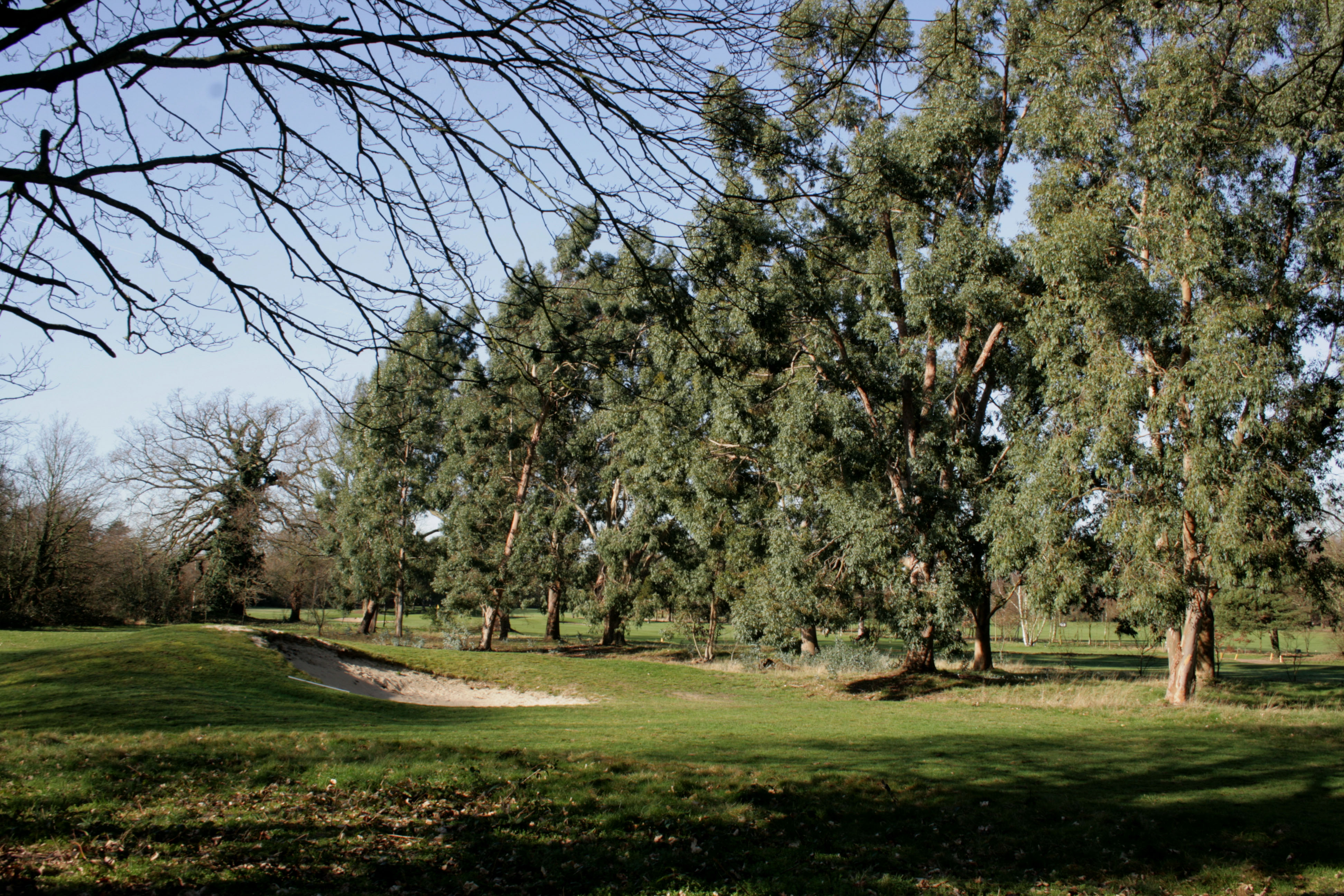
Fulwell Golf Course

The area was farmed during the 17th and 18th centuries and the present day golf course comprised part of Blackmoor Farm and most of Slade Farm. The farmhouse building for the latter, Slade Lodge, built c. 1830 and Grade II listed in 1990, is now the course manager's residence. The area of the present day course formed part of a larger estate which was purchased in 1871 by property developer, Charles James Freake, and renamed Fulwell Park.

In 1904 a group of local golf enthusiasts established the club at Fulwell. Led by prominent local figure H. O. Stutchbury, they appointed former Captain of Mid-Surrey Golf Club, Harry Tomlinson, as chairman and leased 244 acres (99 ha) from the Trustees of the Freake Estate, using 210 acres (85 ha) for the course. Early club officials included Frederick Dixon-Hartland, Viscount Villiers and Dr.Reginald Langdon Down, son of Dr.John Langdon Down.

=== Early courses ===
Phil Gaudin (centre) vs. J.H. Taylor match at Fulwell, June 1906

The initial course on the site comprised an “outer” 18-hole course for men and an “inner” for ladies and high handicappers. It was designed by John Henry Taylor and was similar to the layout at the Royal Mid-Surrey Golf Club where Taylor was the professional. The par 80 course was a long course, with holes varying from 122 to 514 yards, and somewhat flat in appearance. The “inner” course was extended to 18 holes in 1906 making it just under 5,000 yards (4,600 m) in length with the longest hole being 487 yards (445 m), formally opening for play on 19 November 1907. In 1921 Alister MacKenzie, the noted golf course architect, was contracted to extend and improve the outer course.

Phil Gaudin was appointed as the first head golf professional at Fulwell in 1906, and he remained there until the start of World War I in 1914. Gaudin played a match there on 1 June 1906 against Taylor. Taylor led by 6 holes after the first round and eventually won 3&2.

George Oke became resident professional at Fulwell in 1921 and, soon after, a young school-leaver, Leslie Cotton, joined as assistant. In 1923 Leslie's elder brother, Henry Cotton, joined as assistant teaching professional. Henry Cotton soon moved on but Oke remained until 1946.

In 1934 a consortium of Teddington Council, London County Council and Middlesex County Council indicated its intention to purchase the land under the green belt scheme on expiry of the lease in 1941.

=== World War II ===
The war agricultural executive committee instructed the club to lay out the inner course to agricultural use. The resulting loss of half its membership revenue led to an agreement with the landowner, by then Middlesex County Council, to reduce the rent in return for opening up the remaining course to the public and with a commitment to reinstate the inner course after the war.

Three bombs, intended for the nearby National Physical Laboratory, Teddington fell in the course during 25 February 1944.

=== Post war ===
After the war, Middlesex County Council reinstated the course, contracting John Stanton Fleming Morrison for the design. He laid out the present day 18-hole course comprising eight of the original “outer” layout and ten new holes from the land returned from agricultural use. The par 71 course has four par 3, eleven par 4 and three par 5 holes. The new course opened in 1958 and the club was granted a further 21-year lease.

In 1946 Bill Cox succeeded George Oak as professional, establishing a successful teaching academy at Fulwell and remaining until 1975.

=== Ownership and sale ===
Ownership of the land transferred to the Greater London Council. In April 1981 the London Borough of Richmond upon Thames purchased the freehold from the GLC for £159,750.

In March 1983 Richmond agreed to sell both the former Slade's Farm golf course site and adjacent Blackmore Farm site for a sum of £300,000 to D.J. Squires on a 999-year lease. Squires Garden Centre business was established on the Blackmore Farm site. The disposal was authorised both by the GLC and the Secretary of State for the Environment and the sale concluded in March 1986. Squires immediately reassigned the lease of the golf course to Fulwell Golf Club which continued the public play commitment established during the war through a reduced fee access agreement for local residents.

There was some local disquiet about the price achieved from the sale and complaints were made to the Local government ombudsman. From 1995 the matter was investigated by the District Auditor who issued a Public Interest Report in November 1999 that did not uphold the objections. A subsequent complaint to the Audit Commission against the District Auditor was upheld but a request for a further audit refused in 2002. In response to continued protest, the local authority established a scrutiny task force to investigate the allegations. In 2005 the task force published its report and found no evidence of wrongdoing but commented:

Their findings do however give them cause for concern and an understanding of why some members of the public believe that the Council was, at the very least, unprofessional/incompetent, a belief fuelled by a series of apparent coincidences.

Following publication of the report further documents obtained under the Freedom of Information Act threw doubt on the scope of evidence considered by the task force. This resulted in a complaint to the Information Commissioner's Office that was upheld, however the inquiry’s findings were not materially changed.

=== Consideration as a school site ===
In 2018, a triangle of open land behind the David Lloyd Centre was formally assessed by Richmond Council to determine its suitability as a school site. The conclusion was that there would be several barriers to overcome, making it very difficult from a planning perspective.

== Environment ==
Anciently the area formed the southern extent of Hounslow Heath. The agricultural heritage of the site is still visible as drainage ditches and mature tree lines still reflect 19th century field boundaries.

More recently, efforts have been made to promote biodiversity on the site. Non-native Leyland cypress and Eucalyptus trees have been removed and habitats provided for stag beetles and hedgehogs.

== Twickenham Golf Course ==
Twickenham Golf Course
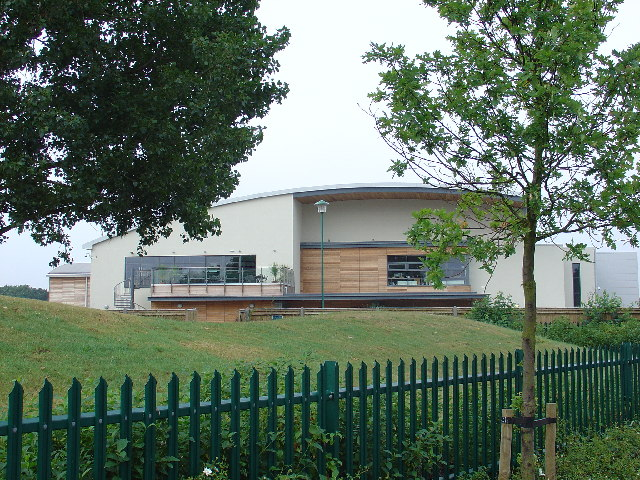
- David Lloyd Centre
- Interactive map of Twickenham Golf Course
- 51°26′00″N 0°21′7.6″W

Club information
- Location: Fulwell, Hampton Hill
- Established: 1975
- Owner: London Borough of Richmond upon Thames
- Operator: David Lloyd Leisure
- Tota holes: 9
- Website: www.davidlloyd.co.uk/club-finder/hampton/golf
- Designed by: J.H. Taylor; Alister MacKenzie
- Par: 70
- Length: 6,076 yards (5,556 m)

With the post-war redevelopment of Fulwell Golf Course in the late 1950s, the nine former "outer course" holes 7 to 15 to the north of the Fulwell site furthest from the Fulwell Golf Club clubhouse were given up for 'recreational purposes'. The intention was to provide hockey and football pitches, bowling green, tennis courts, an open-air swimming pool, gymnasium and café. The high cost of development led to delay and, instead, in 1975, the site was reinstated as a 9-hole public play and pay golf course, known as Twickenham Golf Course with access from the Staines Road. Part of the site became home to Thamesians RFC between 1982 and 1992.

In 2002 the site was transferred to Stax Leisure Ltd (later acquired by David Lloyd Leisure), on a 125-year lease and was sub-let to the Gobafoss partnership, part of AXA in 2005. The 'Amida' sports and recreation facility was developed on the site in 2002 and a swimming pool added in 2011. In 2011 the site operator caused local controversy when access to a footpath crossing the site, popular with dog-walkers and part of a cycle route, was temporarily closed following claims of vandalism.

The present 6,076 yards (5,556 m) par 70 course comprises three par 3, four par 4 and two par 5 holes.
