= British PGA Matchplay Championship =

Tournament information
- Location: York, England
- Established: 1903
- Course: Fulford Golf Club
- Tour: European Tour
- Format: Match play
- Prize fund: £40,000
- Final year: 1979

Tournament record score
- Score: 10 and 8 Henry Cotton (1932)

Final champion
- (Republic of Ireland) Des Smyth
- Location in England Location in North Yorkshire

The British PGA Matchplay Championship was a match play golf tournament that began in 1903 and ran until 1979. Between 1903 and 1969, the event was sponsored by the now defunct British newspaper the News of the World, and was commonly known by the paper's name. Initially organised as the championship of British professionals, the event came to include invited players from other countries – in particular from around the Commonwealth (it was won on four occasions by Australia's Peter Thomson, a record number of victories shared with Dai Rees and James Braid). On occasion, American professionals also took part, notably in 1949 when eight members of the victorious U.S. Ryder Cup side accepted invites to the event, Lloyd Mangrum reaching the semi-finals.

For many years, the event had the richest prize fund in British golf, and certainly in the pre-First World War era, can be considered to have been a "major" championship of its day, as at the time, the British professionals were considered the best players in the world – in 1907 the four semi-finalists were the Great Triumvirate of Harry Vardon, J. H. Taylor and James Braid, along with Ted Ray, who would go on to win both the British and U.S. Opens.

After World War II, the event provided several notable British and Irish players, like Christy O'Connor Snr, Eric Brown and Dave Thomas, with their greatest triumphs, and also became a showcase for the matchplay strength of Neil Coles, who was at least a semi-finalist eleven times in eighteen years, a remarkable achievement considering the field normally comprised 64 and on occasion 128 players.

The tournament was also often notable for remarkable runs to the later stages by veteran players – Max Faulkner was a semi-finalist in 1967 aged 51 and reached the quarter-finals three years later, and in 1969 Dai Rees reached the final aged 56. However, following the establishment of the British PGA Championship (at stroke play) in 1955, the matchplay version lost some of its importance, and the matchplay format fell out of favour with sponsors, who could not guarantee that the final day would feature any "big-name" players to attract a television audience, nor either that the matches would finish at times to coincide with limited scheduled slots for live transmission. The tournament remained an official money event on the European Tour from its first season in 1972, but was discontinued following the 1979 event when a replacement sponsor could not be found after Sun Alliance moved to supporting the stroke play championship instead. The last champion was Irishman Des Smyth, who beat a youthful Nick Price in the final.

== History ==
=== 1903 ===
The tournament was announced in August. £200 had been given by the News of the World to the PGA for the competition. The final stage would be at Sunningdale Golf Club from 13 to 15 October and would be a knock-out match-play contest by 32 professionals. Qualification was by a series of 36-hole stroke-play competitions; one for each of the five PGA sections. The number of qualifiers from each section was based on the membership of that section. The Southern section had 16 qualifiers, the Midland and Northern sections had 5 each, the Scottish section 4 and the Irish section 2. The matches in the final stage were over 18 holes except for the final which was over 36 holes. Extra holes were played in the event of a tied match. The winner received £100, the runner-up £30, losing semi-finalists £15 and losing quarter-finalists £10. The semi-finalists also received medals: the winner gold, the runner-up silver and the losing semi-finalists bronze.

In the first round Jack White, third in the 1903 Open Championship lost to Tom Williamson. Later in the day Tom Vardon who had been second in the Open lost to Ted Ray. In the quarter-finals James Braid beat Alfred Toogood at the 19th hole. In the semi-finals Braid won the first two holes against J.H. Taylor and won 4&2. Ray beat George Coburn 4&3 in the other match. They had been level after 7 holes but Ray won the next 4 to take a convincing lead. In the final Braid led by 1 hole after the first round. In the afternoon Braid won 3 of the first 5 holes to go 4 up and, although Ray won the next two, Braid eventually won 4&3.

=== 1914 ===
The final stages were planned for Oxhey Golf Club on 6, 7 and 8 October with the same format and prize money as previously. In mid-August the PGA cancelled the tournament. The Western section had played their qualification tournament on 9 July at which Charles and Ernest Whitcombe qualified.

=== 1919 ===
The arrangements for the 1919 tournament were sorted out at a late stage. In mid-July it was decided that the number of qualifiers for the final stage would be increased from 32 to 64 and the "News of the World" agreed to increase the prize money. The West of England section had already played their qualifying competition under the impression there were 2 places available. They were allocated 4 in the new system. Other sections were allocated the following places: Southern 26, Northern 12, Midland 10, Scotland 5, Welsh 4, Eastern 2 and Irish 1. The tournament was extended to a fourth day with the 32 18-hole first round matches played on the first day. The losing quarter-finalists received £12 10s, third round losers £10, second round losers £7 10s and first round losers £5. Prize money totalled £590.

=== 1921 ===
Prize money was increased to £750 with the winner receiving £200, the runner-up £50, the losing semi-finalists £30, the losing quarter-finalists £15 and third round losers £12 10s.

=== 1925 ===
Prize money was increased to £1,040 with the winner receiving £300, the runner-up £100, the losing semi-finalists £50, the losing quarter-finalists £25 and prizes of £15, £10 and £5 for losers in the first three rounds.

=== 1935 ===
Prize money was increased to £1,250 with the losing quarter-finalists receiving £27 10s and prizes of £20, £15 and £7 10s for losers in the first three rounds.

=== 1939 ===
The final stages were planned for St George's Hill Golf Club from 12 to 15 September with the same format and prize money as previously. Qualifying events had been completed when the PGA cancelled the tournament in early September on the outbreak of World War II.

=== 1940 ===
The cancelled 1939 event was re-arranged for Royal Mid-Surrey Golf Club from 30 April to 3 May. The 64 qualifiers for the 1939 tournament were invited although a number were unable to play.

=== 1945 ===
The 1945 event was arranged at short notice and there were no qualifying events. There were 149 entries and the tournament was played at Walton Heath Golf Club from 23 to 27 July. 21 matches were played on the first day to reduce the field to 128. There were 64 matches on the second day and then two rounds were played each day. The final was played over 18 holes for the first time. Both New and Old courses were used for the last-128 and last-64 rounds. Total prize money was £2,000 with the winner receiving £600, the runner-up £200, semi-finalists £100, quarter-finalists £50 and prizes of £30, £15 and £10 for those reaching the last-64 stage.

=== 1946 ===
The 1946 tournament reverted to the earlier format with 64 players qualifying for the knock-out stage played from 25 to 28 September. The final was over 36 holes. Prize money remained at £2,000 with £550 for the winner, £250 for the losing finalist and £120 for the losing semi-finalists.

=== 1947 ===
Prize money was increased to £2,500 with £750 for the winner and £250 for the losing finalist.

=== 1949 ===
Eight American golfers who had played in the 1949 Ryder Cup were added to the 64 qualifiers. The 8 were: Skip Alexander, Jimmy Demaret, Bob Hamilton, Dutch Harrison, Clayton Heafner, Lloyd Mangrum, Johnny Palmer and Sam Snead. The additional players meant that 8 preliminary match had to be played to reduce the field to 64. These matches were played on 20 September, extending the event to a fifth day. Total prize money was £2,620.

=== 1950 ===
The 1949 winner (Dai Rees) and the 1950 Open Champion (Bobby Locke) were exempted from qualifying. Locke did not play but with 64 players reaching the final stage through the sectional qualifying events there were 65 qualifiers. This meant that one preliminary match was needed; the match being played the day before the main event started. Total prize money was £2,530.

=== 1951 ===
The 1950 winner (Dai Rees) and the 1951 Open Champion (Max Faulkner) were exempted from qualifying. With a total of 66 players reaching the final stage, two preliminary matches were played the day before the main event started.

=== 1953 ===
The leaders in the Order of Merit were exempted, increasing the number of qualifiers to 76. 12 first-round matches were played to reduce the field to 64. Total prize money was £2,650.

=== 1955 ===
The leader 10 in the Order of Merit were exempted. 10 first-round matches were played to reduce the field to 64. Total prize money was increased to £3,000, although the first prize remained unchanged at £750.

=== 1956 ===
The number of qualifiers from the sectional events was reduced so that there were just 64 contestants in the final stage. The quarter-finals and semi-finals were extended to 36 holes, the event being played over 5 days from 11 to 15 September.

=== 1957 ===
The format was changed, with the first round matches being over 36 holes, spread over two days. The quarter-finals and semi-finals were reduced again to 18 holes, although the final was still over 36 holes.

=== 1958 ===
The format was changed again. All matches were reduced to 18 holes and the event reduced from 5 days to 4. One round was played on the first two days, the third round and quarter-finals were played on the third day with the semi-finals and final on the final day. This was only the second final, after 1945, to be contested over 18 holes.

=== 1962 ===
Sectional qualifying was dropped and replaced by local qualifying on the two days prior to the knock-out stage. Two courses were used. There was a sudden-death playoff to get exactly 64 qualifiers.

=== 1964 ===
12 players who had competed in the Carling World Open the previous week were exempted from qualifying so that only 52 qualified through local qualifying.

== Winners ==
Year	Winner	Score	Runner-up	Winner's share (£)	Venue	Ref.
Sun Alliance Match Play Championship
1979	(Republic of Ireland) Des Smyth	1 up	(Zimbabwe) Nick Price	6,660	Fulford	
1978	(England) Mark James	3 and 2	(England) Neil Coles	8,000	Dalmahoy	
1977	(South Africa) Hugh Baiocchi	6 and 5	(Wales) Brian Huggett	4,000	Stoke Poges	
1976	(Scotland) Brian Barnes	4 and 3	(Wales) Craig Defoy	3,500	Kings Norton	
1975	(Northern Ireland) Eddie Polland	23 holes	(England) Peter Butler	3,500	Lindrick	
Benson & Hedges Match Play Championship
1974	(Australia) Jack Newton	2 and 1	(Mexico) Cesar Sanudo	3,500	Downfield	
1973	(England) Neil Coles (3)	2 holes	(England) Doug McClelland	3,500	Hillside	
1972	(England) John Garner	7 and 6	(England) Neil Coles	3,500	Moor Park	
1971: No tournament
Long John Scotch Whisky Match Play Championship
1970	(England) Tommy Horton	3 and 2	(Scotland) Ronnie Shade	2,000	Moor Park	
News of the World Match Play Championship
1969	(England) Maurice Bembridge	6 and 5	(Wales) Dai Rees	1,250	Walton Heath	
1968	(Wales) Brian Huggett	1 up	(Scotland) John Panton	1,250	Walton Heath	
1967	(Australia) Peter Thomson (4)	4 and 3	(Wales) Dai Rees	1,250	Walton Heath	
1966	(Australia) Peter Thomson (3)	2 and 1	(England) Neil Coles	1,250	Walton Heath	
1965	(England) Neil Coles (2)	19 holes	(England) Lionel Platts	1,250	Walton Heath	
1964	(England) Neil Coles	3 and 2	(England) Peter Butler	1,250	Walton Heath	
1963	(Wales) Dave Thomas	3 and 2	(Scotland) John MacDonald	1,250	Turnberry	
1962	(Scotland) Eric Brown (2)	19 holes	(England) Ross Whitehead		Walton Heath	
1961	(Australia) Peter Thomson (2)	3 and 1	(England) Ralph Moffitt		Walton Heath	
1960	(Scotland) Eric Brown	20 holes	(England) Harry Weetman	750	Turnberry	
1959	(England) David Snell	3 and 2	(England) Harry Weetman	750	Royal Birkdale	
1958	(England) Harry Weetman (2)	1 up	(England) Bernard Hunt	750	Walton Heath	
1957	(Republic of Ireland) Christy O'Connor Snr	5 and 4	(Scotland) Tom Haliburton	750	Turnberry	
1956	(Scotland) John Panton	1 up	(England) Harry Weetman	750	Royal Liverpool	
1955	(England) Ken Bousfield	4 and 3	(Scotland) Eric Brown	750	Walton Heath	
1954	(Australia) Peter Thomson	38 holes	(Scotland) John Fallon	750	St Andrews	
1953	(England) Max Faulkner	1 up	(Wales) Dai Rees	750	Ganton	
1952	(Northern Ireland) Fred Daly (3)	4 and 3	(Belgium) Flory Van Donck	750	Walton Heath	
1951	(England) Harry Weetman	5 and 4	(Scotland) Jimmy Adams	750	Royal Liverpool	
1950	(Wales) Dai Rees (4)	7 and 6	(England) Frank Jowle	750	Carnoustie	
1949	(Wales) Dai Rees (3)	1 up	(England) Henry Cotton	750	Walton Heath	
1948	(Northern Ireland) Fred Daly (2)	4 and 3	(Scotland) Laurie Ayton, Jnr	750	Royal Birkdale	
1947	(Northern Ireland) Fred Daly	3 and 2	(Belgium) Flory Van Donck	750	Royal Lytham & St Annes	
1946	(England) Henry Cotton (3)	8 and 7	(Scotland) Jimmy Adams	550	Royal Liverpool	
News of the World Match Play
1945	(England) Reg Horne	4 and 3	(England) Percy Alliss	600	Walton Heath	
1941–1944: No tournament due to World War II
1940	(England) Henry Cotton (2)	37 holes	(England) Alf Padgham	300	Royal Mid-Surrey	
1939: No tournament
1938	(Wales) Dai Rees (2)	4 and 3	(England) Eddie Whitcombe	300	Walton Heath	
1937	(England) Percy Alliss (2)	3 and 2	(Scotland) Jimmy Adams	300	Stoke Poges	
1936	(Wales) Dai Rees	1 up	(England) Ernest Whitcombe	300	Oxhey	
1935	(England) Alf Padgham (2)	3 and 2	(England) Percy Alliss	300	Royal Mid-Surrey	
1934	(England) Jack Busson	2 up	(England) Charles Whitcombe	300	Walton Heath	
1933	(England) Percy Alliss	5 and 4	(England) Mark Seymour	300	Purley Downs	
1932	(England) Henry Cotton	10 and 8	(England) Alf Perry	300	Moor Park	
1931	(England) Alf Padgham	5 and 4	(England) Mark Seymour	300	Royal Mid-Surrey	
1930	(England) Charles Whitcombe (2)	4 and 2	(England) Henry Cotton	300	Oxhey	
1929	(England) Abe Mitchell (3)	8 and 7	(England) Philip Rodgers	300	Wentworth	
1928	(England) Charles Whitcombe	4 and 2	(England) Henry Cotton	300	Stoke Poges	
1927	(England) Archie Compston (2)	8 and 7	(Scotland) James Braid	300	Walton Heath	
1926	(Scotland) Sandy Herd (2)	38 holes	(England) Jack Bloxham	300	Royal Mid-Surrey	
1925	(England) Archie Compston	3 and 1	(England) George Gadd	300	Moor Park	
1924	(England) Ernest Whitcombe	3 and 2	(England) George Gadd	200	St George's Hill	
1923	(England) Reg Wilson	4 and 2	(Jersey) Thomas Renouf	200	Walton Heath	
1922	(England) George Gadd	5 and 4	(England) Fred Leach	200	Sunningdale	
1921	(England) Bert Seymour	40 holes	(Jersey) Jack Gaudin	200	Oxhey	
1920	(England) Abe Mitchell (2)	3 and 2	(England) Josh Taylor	100	Mid-Surrey	
1919	(England) Abe Mitchell	1 up	(Scotland) George Duncan	100	Walton Heath	
1914–1918: No tournament due to World War I
1913	(Scotland) George Duncan	3 and 2	(Scotland) James Braid	100	Walton Heath	
1912	(Jersey) Harry Vardon	1 up	(Jersey) Ted Ray	100	Sunningdale	
1911	(Scotland) James Braid (4)	1 up	(Jersey) Ted Ray	100	Walton Heath	
1910	(England) James Sherlock	8 and 6	(Scotland) George Duncan	100	Sunningdale	
1909	(England) Tom Ball	7 and 5	(Scotland) Sandy Herd	100	Walton Heath	
1908	(England) J.H. Taylor (2)	2 up	(England) Fred Robson	100	Mid-Surrey	
1907	(Scotland) James Braid (3)	4 and 2	(England) J.H. Taylor	100	Sunningdale	
1906	(Scotland) Sandy Herd	8 and 7	(England) Charles Mayo	100	Notts	
1905	(Scotland) James Braid (2)	4 and 3	(Jersey) Tom Vardon	100	Walton Heath	
1904	(England) J.H. Taylor	5 and 3	(England) Alfred Toogood	100	Mid-Surrey	
1903	(Scotland) James Braid	4 and 3	(Jersey) Ted Ray	100	Sunningdale	

== See also ==
- Volvo World Match Play Championship – another matchplay championship played in the United Kingdom, which has been an official money event on the European Tour since 2004.
