= Jack Gaudin =

British professional golfer

Personal information
- Full name: John William Gaudin
- Nationality: Jersey
- Born: 1876 Grouville, Jersey
- Died: 10 December 1947 (aged 70) Leeds, Yorkshire, England

Career
- Sport: Golf
- Status: Professional
- Professional wins: 2

Best results in major championships
- Masters Tournament: DNP
- PGA Championship: DNP
- U.S. Open: DNP
- The Open Championship: T6: 1925

John William Gaudin (1876 – 10 December 1947) was a professional golfer from Jersey. His most successful period was in the early 1920s when he was in his late-40s. Gaudin had four brothers who were also professional golfers, his older brother Willie and younger brothers Phil, Ernest and Herbert.

== Golf career ==
Gaudin was particularly successful from 1920 to 1925. He had a number of good finishes in the Open Championship including being tied for 6th place in 1925. He was runner-up in the 1921 News of the World Match Play. He met Bert Seymour in the 36-hole final. Gaudin missed a three-foot putt at the last and the match went to extra holes. Seymour missed short putts at the second and third extra holes and eventually won the match with another short putt at the 40th hole. Seymour won £200 for his victory while Gaudin took home £50. Gaudin won the Leeds Cup in 1922 and 1924 and was runner-up in 1924. He was runner-up in the 1923 French Open.

== Retirement and death ==
Gaudin retired from Alwoodley Golf Club, Leeds, in 1946 after 34 years there and died the following year on 10 December 1947.

== Professional wins ==
- 1922 Leeds Cup
- 1923 Leeds Cup

== Results in major championships ==
Tournament	1902	1903	1904	1905	1906	1907	1908	1909
The Open Championship	CUT							

Tournament	1910	1911	1912	1913	1914	1915	1916	1917	1918	1919
The Open Championship	WD	WD		WD	WD	NT	NT	NT	NT	NT

Tournament	1920	1921	1922	1923	1924	1925	1926	1927	1928	1929
The Open Championship	T16	15		T29	T16	T6	CUT	CUT		CUT

Tournament	1930	1931	1932	1933	1934	1935	1936	1937
The Open Championship							CUT	CUT

Note: Gaudin only played in The Open Championship.

Top 10
Did not play

NT = No tournament
WD = withdrew
CUT = missed the half-way cut
"T" indicates a tie for a place
