= Ilkley Golf Club =

Golf Club in West Yorkshire England

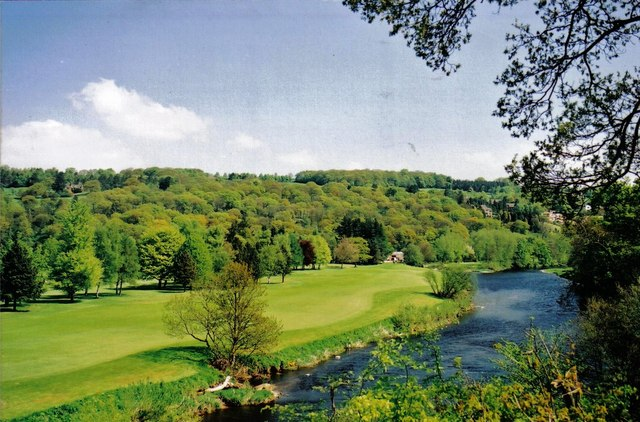
- Ilkley Golf Club

- Location within West Yorkshire
- 53°55′51″N 1°51′1″W

Club information
- Location: Ilkley, West Yorkshire, England
- Established: June 1890
- Total holes: 18

Ilkley Golf Club is a golf club in West Yorkshire, England, in the town of Ilkley. It is located to the north-west of Ilkley in Middleton and south-east of Addingham. The River Wharfe flows past the course. It was established in 1890.

== History ==
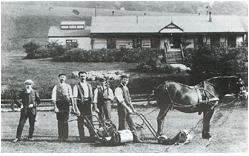
Greenstaff and their equipment. Tom Vardon at left, c. 1900

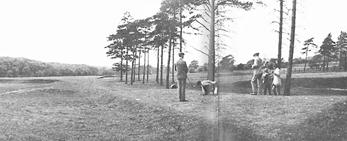
7th hole, c. 1910

Ilkley is the oldest club in the West Riding and the third oldest in Yorkshire (Beverly and East Riding Golf Club 1889); a 9-hole course was established on Rombald's Moor at the behest of Ben Hirst and Alfred Potter in June 1890. The location for the original 9-hole course was planned with assistance from George Strath, the club professional at Southport and George Kay, the club professional at Redcar was employed at £1 per week to lay out the course.

In October 1897 the committee negotiated with Myddleton Estate to rent 70 acres of pasture running along the north side of the River Wharfe. Work began on the new course in February 1898 and was completed by July of that year. The course was designed by Alister MacKenzie and Harry Colt and measures 6,262 yards. The old links course on the moor was leased to an Ilkley Tradesmen's group and golf continued to be played there until the Moor Club was wound up in 1947. On 13 April 1907, Harry Vardon and noted golf architect James Braid played an exhibition match to mark the opening of the new clubhouse. In 1921 the course was described as an "excellent links" course. In 1970 many trees were planted around the course, changing its appearance. The club has hosted the competition for the OCCA and West Riding Golf Trophies, the Yorkshire Ladies' Challenge Bowl in 1955 and the British Girls' Open Championship in 1969.

The 19th bar in the Clubhouse has on display one of the golf balls that Alan Shepard took to the Moon on Apollo 14 in 1971. The ball was given by Shephard to Father Paddy Roche who bequeathed it to the club.

== Members ==
A number of professionals started or played at Ilkley, including Harry Vardon, Tom Vardon, Sam Whiting, William Baxter, John Ball, Peter Thomson, Bill Ferguson, Colin Montgomerie, Mark James, and James Hepworth. Harry Vardon won his first prize as a professional golfer on this course in 1893. Montgomerie met Ferguson at the club when Ferguson was club pro and Montgomerie was just a boy.

== Professionals ==
- 1890–1892 George Kay
- 1892–1893 Thomas P. Waggot
- 1893–1900 Tom Vardon
- 1900–1903 Douglas McEwan
- 1903–1911 Walter Toogood
- 1911–1921 Samuel Whiting
- 1921–1926 James MacKenzie
- 1926–1964 Jock D. Henderson
- 1964–1969 David L. Melville
- 1969–1979 William J. Ferguson (Bill Ferguson)
- 1979–2015 John L. Hammond
- 2015–2022 Andrew P. Driver
- 2023–2024 Andrew R. Turner
- 2025–present day Glen Ient
