= Fred Taggart =

English golfer

Personal information
- Full name: Joseph Frederick Taggart
- Nationality: England
- Born: 29 January 1906 Alderley Edge, Cheshire, England
- Died: 6 September 1986 (aged 80) Cheshire, England

Career
- Sport: Golf
- Status: Professional

Best results in major championships
- Masters Tournament: DNP
- PGA Championship: DNP
- U.S. Open: DNP
- The Open Championship: T11: 1928

Joseph Frederick Taggart (29 January 1906 – 6 September 1986) was an English professional golfer of the inter-war period. He finished 11th in the 1928 Open Championship.

== Early life ==
Taggart was born in Alderley Edge, Cheshire in 1906. His father, Joe (1881–1944), was the professional at Wilmslow Golf Club.

== Golf career ==
Taggart's best finish in the Open Championship was tied for 11th place in 1928. He was tied for 6th place after 36 holes, with rounds of 76 and 74. Final day rounds of 77 and 67 dropped him to 11th place. In the 1931 Open Championship Taggart started with a 70 to lie in second place behind Henry Cotton. Rounds of 76, 82 and 77 left him tied for 31st place.

Fred succeeded his father as professional at Wilmslow in 1934.

== Results in major championships ==
Tournament	1926	1927	1928	1929
The Open Championship	CUT		T11	T32

Tournament	1930	1931	1932	1933	1934	1935	1936	1937	1938	1939
The Open Championship	CUT	56	T39	CUT	T31			CUT	CUT	T26

Tournament	1940	1941	1942	1943	1944	1945	1946	1947
The Open Championship	NT	NT	NT	NT	NT	NT	CUT	CUT

Note: Taggart only played in The Open Championship.

Did not play

CUT = missed the half-way cut
"T" indicates a tie for a place
