= Manchester Golf Club =

Golf club in Middleton, Greater Manchester, England

- Location within Greater Manchester
- 53.572834°N 2.179137°W

Club information
- Location: Middleton, England
- Established: 1882
- Tota holes: 18

Manchester Golf Club, is a golf club in Middleton, Greater Manchester, England.

The club was founded in 1882 as the Manchester St Andrews Golf Club, to distinguish it from another club under a similar name. In 1883, the words "St Andrew’s" was dropped and the original Manchester Golf Club became known as the "'Old' Manchester Golf Club".

The club originally played on a 9-hole course at Manley Park. In 1898, the club relocated to Trafford Park, with Trafford Hall becoming the clubhouse. With the lease on the course expiring, the club was on the move again in 1912, this time to Hopwood Park. The 18-hole course at Hopwood Park was designed by Harry Shapland Colt. In 1925, the club secured its home when it bought the freehold. The course has since been lengthened, from its original 6145 yards, to 6491 yards.
