= James Sherlock (golfer) =

English golfer (1875–1966)

- Sherlock in 1923 at King's Lynn Golf Club in a match played against James Braid

Personal information
- Full name: James George Sherlock
- Nationality: England
- Born: 1875 High Wycombe, Buckinghamshire, England
- Died: 16 December 1966 (aged 91) Hunstanton, Norfolk, England

Career
- Sport: Golf
- Status: Professional
- Professional wins: 16

Best results in major championships
- Masters Tournament: DNP
- PGA Championship: DNP
- U.S. Open: DNP
- The Open Championship: 6th: 1904

James George Sherlock (1875 – 16 December 1966) was an English professional golfer. He had four top-10 finishes in the Open Championship, including a sixth-place finish in 1904. In his long golf career, he had at least 16 professional wins. He played for the British team against the United States in the 1921 Ryder Cup match at Gleneagles.

== Early life ==
James Sherlock was born in 1875 in High Wycombe, Buckinghamshire, England.

== Golf career ==
1910 was Sherlock's most successful year when, after a disappointing Open Championship, he then won the Olton Professional Tournament, the Portmarnock Professional Tournament, the Tooting Bec Cup and the News of the World Matchplay.

In 1920 Sherlock became the professional at Hunstanton Golf Club, where he remained until 1932 when he moved to Aldeburgh. He played for the British team against the United States in the 1921 Ryder Cup match at Gleneagles.

Sherlock continued playing at an advanced age. He attempted to qualify for the 1939 Open Championship. In 1958 he won his age group (age 70 and over) in the Teachers Senior Professional Tournament scoring 140 over 27 holes. He played in the event as late as 1960 when he was 85 years old.

== Death and legacy ==
Sherlock died on 16 December 1966 at Hunstanton, England, aged 91. He is best remembered for having four top-10 finishes in the Open Championship, including a sixth-place finish in 1904 when he had rounds of 83-71-78-77=309 and won £7 10s.

== Tournament wins ==
Note: This list is incomplete.

- 1901 Olton Professional Tournament
- 1905 Ranfurly Castle Professional Tournament
- 1909 Tooting Bec Cup
- 1910 Olton Professional Tournament, Portmarnock Professional Tournament, Tooting Bec Cup, News of the World Matchplay
- 1912 Sphere and Tatler Foursomes Tournament (with George Duncan)
- 1922 Norfolk Professional Championship
- 1923 Norfolk Professional Championship
- 1924 Norfolk Professional Championship
- 1928 Norfolk Professional Championship
- 1929 Norfolk Professional Championship
- 1930 Norfolk Professional Championship
- 1935 Dunlop-Eastern Tournament
- 1936 Dunlop-Eastern Tournament

== Results in major championships ==
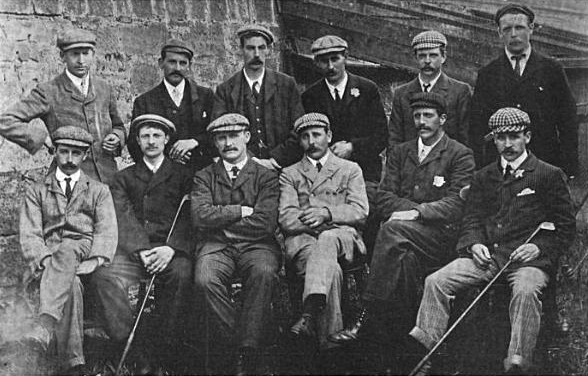
A group photo of the 1903 English golf team prior to their international match against Scotland. Sherlock is standing in the back row on the far left. J. H. Taylor and Tom Vardon are in the center of the front row, from left to right, respectively. Albert Tingey, Sr. is seated on the far right, front row, with Ted Ray seated to his right.

Tournament	1897	1898	1899
The Open Championship	27		WD

Tournament	1900	1901	1902	1903	1904	1905	1906	1907	1908	1909
The Open Championship		WD	17	CUT	6	8	CUT		T37	34

Tournament	1910	1911	1912	1913	1914	1915	1916	1917	1918	1919
The Open Championship	T28	T16	T31	T7	T34	NT	NT	NT	NT	NT

Tournament	1920	1921	1922	1923	1924	1925	1926	1927	1928	1929
The Open Championship	T16				T9		T36			

Tournament	1930	1931	1932	1933	1934	1935	1936
The Open Championship	CUT						CUT

Note: Sherlock only played in The Open Championship.

Top 10
Did not play

NT = No tournament
WD = withdrew
CUT = missed the half-way cut
"T" indicates a tie for a place

== Team appearances ==
- England–Scotland Professional Match (representing England): 1903, 1904 (tie), 1905 (tie), 1906 (winners) 1907 (winners), 1909 (winners), 1910 (winners), 1912 (tie), 1913 (winners)
- Coronation Match (representing the Professionals): 1911 (winners)
- Great Britain vs USA (representing Great Britain): 1921 (winners)
- Seniors vs Juniors (representing the Seniors): 1928 (winners)
