= George Gadd =

English professional golfer (1890–1957)

Personal information
- Full name: Francis George Gadd
- Nationality: England
- Born: 20 August 1890 Malvern, Worcestershire, England
- Died: 25 September 1957 (aged 67) Roehampton, London, England

Career
- Sport: Golf
- Status: Professional
- Professional wins: 5

Best results in major championships
- Masters Tournament: DNP
- PGA Championship: DNP
- U.S. Open: DQ: 1927
- The Open Championship: T9: 1924

Francis George Gadd (20 August 1890 – 25 September 1957) was an English professional golfer. He was on the 1927 Ryder Cup team but did not play in any matches.

== Early life ==
Gadd was born in Malvern, Worcestershire, England. He was the eldest of a number of golfing brothers, including Bert Gadd who won the French and Irish Open Championships.

== Career ==
At the age of eighteen, Gadd was the professional at Tywyn golf club in Merionethshire. He was Welsh Professional Champion in 1913, won the 1922 News of the World Match Play, won the Northern Professional Championship in 1924 and 1926, and tied for the Surrey Open Championship in 1926. He was also runner-up in the News of the World Match Play in 1924 and 1925.

He was professional at the Roehampton Club from 1914 except for a period when he was at Malden Golf Club, New Malden from 1937 to 1945. He had resigned as professional at Roehampton in 1956.

== Death ==
Gadd died at his bungalow at the Roehampton Club on 25 September 1957. He had become depressed by his failing health and had died in a gas-filled room. The coroner returned a verdict "that he died from self-administered carbon monoxide poisoning".

== Professional wins ==
this list may be incomplete

- 1913 Welsh Professional Championship
- 1922 News of the World Match Play
- 1924 Daily Dispatch Northern Professional Championship
- 1926 Daily Dispatch Northern Professional Championship, Surrey Open Championship (tie)

== Results in major championships ==
Tournament	1914	1915	1916	1917	1918	1919
U.S. Open				NT	NT	
The Open Championship	WD	NT	NT	NT	NT	NT

Tournament	1920	1921	1922	1923	1924	1925	1926	1927	1928	1929
U.S. Open								DQ		
The Open Championship	T40		T12	T29	T9		T24	WD	T23	

Tournament	1930	1931	1932	1933	1934
U.S. Open					
The Open Championship	T44	CUT	T58		T50

Note: Gadd only played in The Open Championship and the U.S. Open.

Top 10
Did not play

NT = no tournament
WD = withdrew
DQ = disqualified
CUT = missed the half-way cut
"T" indicates a tie for a place

== Team appearances ==
- Great Britain vs USA (representing Great Britain): 1926 (winners)
- Ryder Cup (representing Great Britain): 1927
