= Rowland Jones (golfer) =

English professional golfer (1871–1952)

Personal information
- Full name: Rowland Thomas Jones
- Nationality: England
- Born: 1871 St Helens, Isle of Wight, England
- Died: 2 February 1952 (aged 80–81) St Helens, Isle of Wight, England

Career
- Sport: Golf
- Turned professional: c. 1890
- Professional wins: 1

Best results in major championships
- Masters Tournament: DNP
- PGA Championship: DNP
- U.S. Open: DNP
- The Open Championship: T2: 1905

Rowland Thomas Jones (1871 – 2 February 1952) was an English professional golfer who played in the late 19th and early 20th century. Jones had two top-10 finishes in the Open Championship. His best performance came in the 1905 Open Championship when he finished tied for second place.

== Early life ==
Jones was born in St Helens, Isle of Wight, England, in 1871, the son of James Jones and Maria Saunders.

== Golfing career ==
Jones won the Tooting Bec Cup in 1908 having been a runner-up in 1901. He was runner-up in the London Professional Foursomes Tournament in 1907, where he partnered Alfred Toogood, and was a losing semi-finalist in the 1905 and 1906 News of the World Match Play. He won the Belgian Open in 1920 and, as late as 1924, he was runner-up in the Roehampton Invitation Tournament where he lost by 1 hole to Ted Ray.

Jones was professional at Wimbledon Park Golf Club for 37 years from the opening of the club in 1898 until his retirement in 1935. He had earlier been at Littlehampton Golf Club since at least 1893.

=== 1905 Open Championship ===
The 1905 Open Championship was held 7–9 June at the Old Course at St Andrews, Fife, Scotland. Scottish champion golfer James Braid won the Championship for the second time, by five strokes from runners-up Jones and the legendary J.H. Taylor.

All entries played 18 holes on the first two days with all those within 14 strokes of the leader making the cut and playing 36 holes on the final day. Strong winds and baked hardpan conditions made scoring exceptionally difficult on all three days. Only a few players managed to break 80. Sandy Herd, Taylor and Harry Vardon led after the first round with scores of 80. Scoring was marginally better on the second day with Jones's 77 giving him the lead on 158. He was followed by Braid on 159 and James Kinnell and Arnaud Massy on 161. Just 45 players made the cut of 172 and only one amateur, John Graham, Jr., was among those select few.

Braid had round-by-round scoring of 81-78-78-81=318 and won £50. Jones's rounds of 81-77-87-78=323 enabled him to go home with £20. The third round 87 was detrimental to his opportunity to win.

== Death ==
Jones died at St Helens, Isle of Wight, on 2 February 1952.

== Tournament wins (1) ==
Note: This list may be incomplete.

- 1920 Belgian Open

== Results in major championships ==
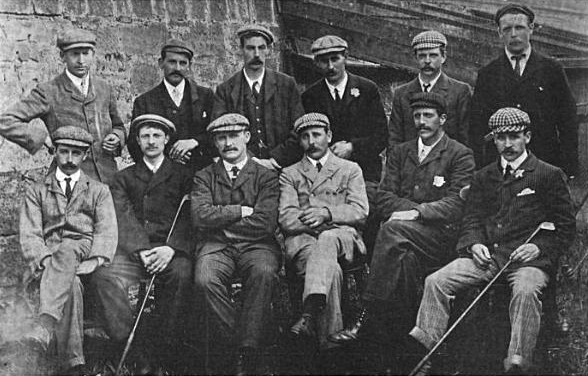
A group photo of the 1903 England golf team. Standing on the far right is Rowland Jones.

Tournament	1893	1894	1895	1896	1897	1898	1899
The Open Championship	WD	29		T33			

Tournament	1900	1901	1902	1903	1904	1905	1906	1907	1908	1909
The Open Championship		11	T12	T25^{†}	T27	T2	5	WD	T24	T26

Tournament	1910	1911	1912	1913	1914	1915	1916	1917	1918	1919
The Open Championship	T38	T16	T27			NT	NT	NT	NT	NT

Tournament	1920	1921	1922	1923	1924	1925	1926	1927	1928
The Open Championship		T39	60		T22			CUT	CUT

Note: Jones only played in The Open Championship.

Top 10
Did not play

NT = No tournament
WD = Withdrew
CUT = missed the half-way cut
"T" indicates a tie for a place

^{†} In 1903 Jones was disqualified after the first day for incorrectly placing his ball on one of the holes. He was then reinstated and completed the final two rounds.

== Team appearances ==
- England–Scotland Professional Match (representing England): 1903, 1904 (tie), 1905 (tie), 1906 (winners) 1907 (winners), 1909 (winners), 1910 (winners), 1912 (tie), 1913 (winners)
- Coronation Match (representing the Professionals): 1911 (winners)
