= Royal Mid-Surrey Golf Club =

Golf club in London, England

Royal Mid-Surrey Golf Course
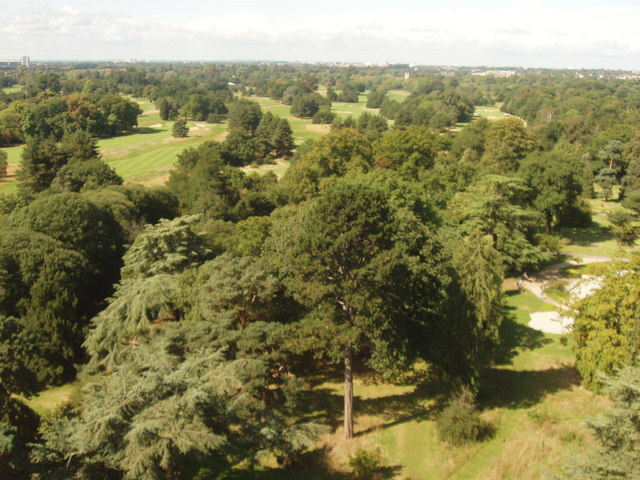
- View across to Royal Mid-Surrey Golf Course from Kew Gardens Pagoda

- Royal Mid-Surrey Golf Course
- 51°28′1″N 0°18′25″W

Club information
- Location: Richmond, London
- Established: 1892
- Type: private
- Owner: Crown Estate
- Total holes: 36
- Tournaments: Antlers Open (Amateur Foursomes); Mothers and Daughters Open
- Website: http://www.rmsgc.co.uk

Outer course
- Designed by: J. H. Taylor
- Par: 69
- Length: 6,318 yards (5,777 m)

Inner course
- Designed by: J. H. Taylor
- Par: 68
- Length: 5,634 yards (5,152 m)

The Royal Mid-Surrey Golf Club is a private golf club and golf course comprising two 18-hole courses located in Old Deer Park in Richmond, south west London.

== Location ==
The course lies in an arc of Crown Estate land on the east bank of the River Thames which includes Kew Gardens to the north and other parts of Old Deer Park to the south. The Old Deer Park sports ground, used by London Welsh RFC and other clubs, borders the east of the course.

== History ==
Within the boundaries of the golf course lies the Grade I listed Kew Observatory, established by King George III in 1769. To the SW of the Observatory, under the fairway of the 14th hole of the golf course, lie the foundations of the former Carthusian Sheen Priory, founded by Henry V in 1414.

The course and club were established in 1892 and J. H. Taylor, one of the famous 'Great Triumvirate' of Braid, Taylor and Vardon, laid out the 36-hole golf course on the northern section of Old Deer Park Park. Prince George, Duke of Cambridge was the club's first president and the Royal connection continued when the Prince of Wales became captain in 1926.

Taylor remained based at the club until 1946 and, along with greenkeeper Peter Lees, developed many features to relieve the otherwise flat landscape. Taylor handed over the role of club professional to Henry Cotton who was succeeded by his assistant, Max Faulkner. Faulkner continued until 1953. Jimmy Adams took over on his return from Australia and held the post until 1969 when David Talbot took over. Talbot was succeeded by his son, Philip in 1999, after a long and distinguished career as a professional lasting 47 years.

In March 2001 a fire destroyed the clubhouse and, with it, a substantial collection of memorabilia, portraits, pictures and trophies. The building was replaced by a larger one and was opened in November 2003 by Prince Andrew, Duke of York.

== Courses ==
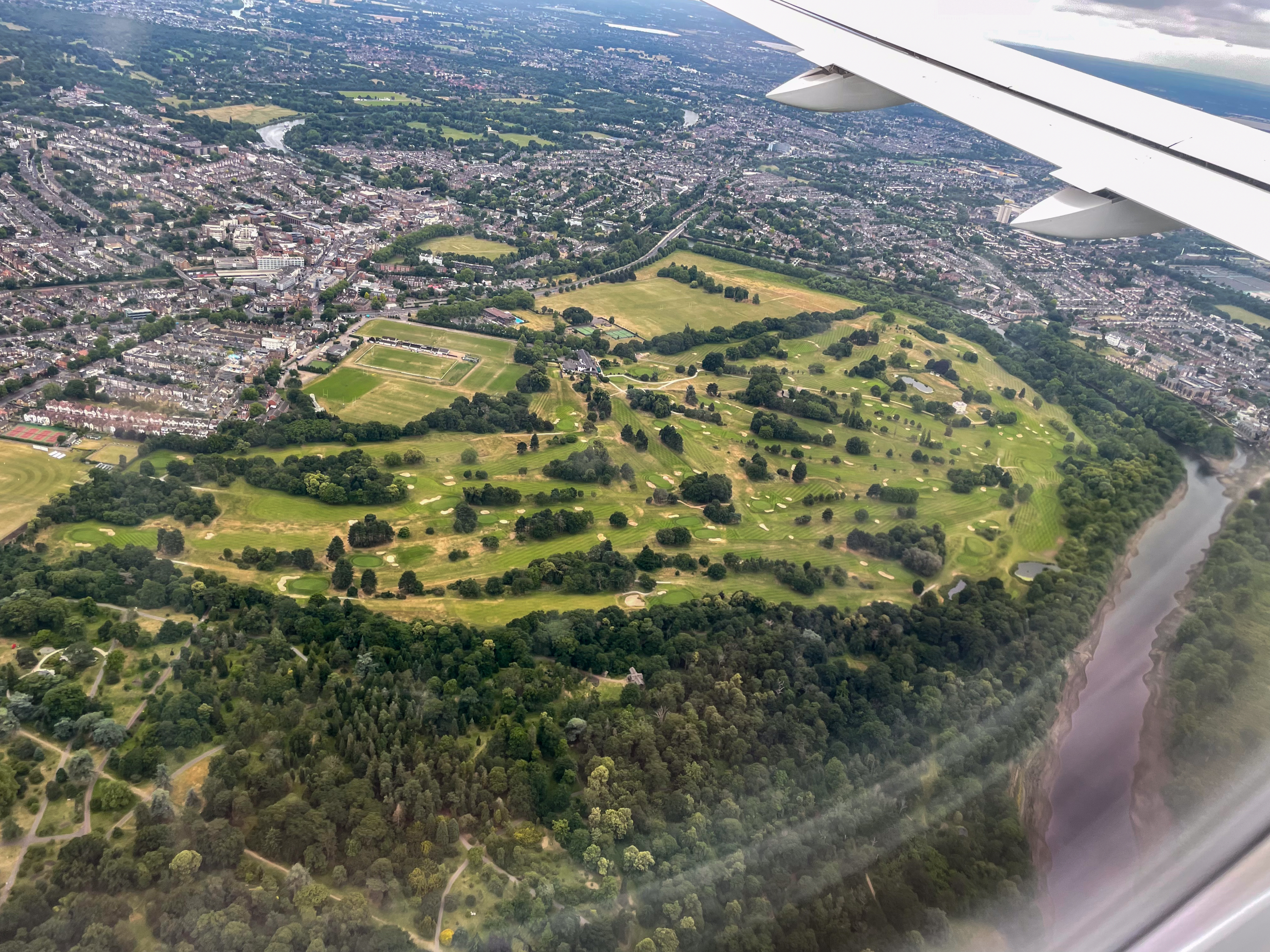
The courses seen from an aeroplane

The course is divided into two 18-hole courses, an outer and inner course named after famous members of the club.

=== JH Taylor Course ===
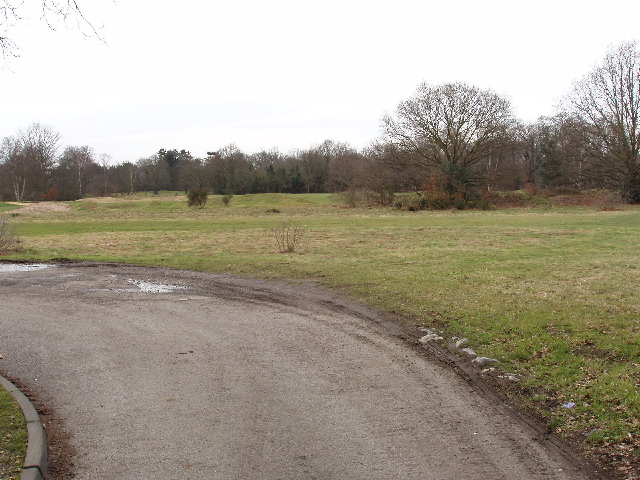
Outer course from Oxenhouse Gate of Kew Gardens

The JH Taylor course is 18-hole, 6,318 yards (5,777 m), par 69, with the 531 yards (486 m), par 5, second hole being the longest.

=== Pam Barton Course ===
The Pam Barton course is 18-hole, 5,634 yards (5,152 m), par 68 with the 7th, par 4, 459 yards (420 m), being the longest.

== Other facilities ==
The course also has practice facilities and a pro shop.

== See also ==
- List of golf clubs granted Royal status
- Richmond Golf Club
- Richmond Park Golf Course
