= Tom Vardon =

Jersey professional golfer (1974–1938)

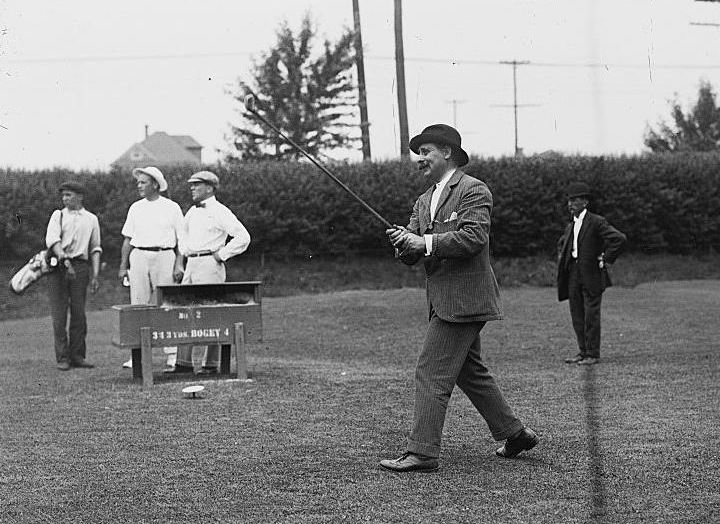
- Vardon hitting a shot, c. 1913

Personal information
- Full name: Thomas Alfred Vardon
- Nationality: Jersey
- Born: 11 October 1874 Grouville, Jersey, Channel Islands
- Died: 13 October 1938 (aged 64) Saint Paul, Minnesota, U.S.
- Spouse: Minnie Stevenson
- Children: 2

Career
- Sport: Golf
- Status: Professional

Best results in major championships
- Masters Tournament: DNP
- PGA Championship: DNP
- U.S. Open: T9: 1916
- The Open Championship: 2nd: 1903

Achievements and awards
- Minnesota PGA Golf Hall of Fame: 2012

Thomas Alfred Vardon (11 October 1874 – 13 October 1938) was a professional golfer from Jersey, Channel Islands, and the brother of golfer Harry Vardon, whom he sometimes played against professionally. From 1892 to 1909 he played in 18 Open Championships, finishing in the top-10 nine times. His best was a second-place finish to his brother Harry in 1903 at Prestwick, and other placings were 1897 at Royal Liverpool Golf Club, Hoylake – 8th, 1902 at Hoylake – 5th, 1904 at Royal St George's Golf Club, Sandwich, Kent – 4th, 1907 at Hoylake – T3.

Vardon tied for ninth place in the 1916 U.S. Open held June 29–30 at Minikahda Club in Minneapolis, Minnesota. He continued playing professional golf for four decades and became the oldest competitor at the 1930 U.S. Open at Interlachen Country Club.

== Early life ==
Vardon was born at Grouville, Jersey, Channel Islands, to Philip George Vardon (1829–1914) and Elizabeth Augustine Bouchard (1837–1920). In 1894 he married Minnie Stevenson. They had two children, Stella F. Vardon and Leonard Harry Vardon. Vardon was the head professional at a number of golf clubs including Ilkley Golf Club from 1893 to 1900 and Royal St George's Golf Club.

In 1909 Vardon emigrated to the United States, departing Southampton, England, aboard the SS Majestic on 16 June 1909 and arrived on 24 June 1909 in New York City. He had been given four months leave from Royal St George's to work at the Onwentsia Club in Lake Forest, Illinois. This was part of a deal that allowed Vardon to enter that year's U.S. Open held at Englewood Golf Club, New Jersey. He finished his career at White Bear Yacht Club, located at White Bear Lake in Minnesota, arriving in 1916 and remaining there until his death in 1938, although he retired on pension one year before his death.

== Golf course architecture ==
Vardon was involved in golf course architecture, designing or helping with the design of 40 courses. Pamphlets that survived the clubhouse fire at White Bear Yacht Club in 1937 record that although the original golf course design was by William Watson, there was further development by Vardon and Donald Ross. Along with Robert W. Diehl, Vardon also wrote a how-to manual on golf, the Diehl-Vardon Golf Manual which was published in 1927 by the Western Golf Publishing Company.

=== Vardon designed courses ===
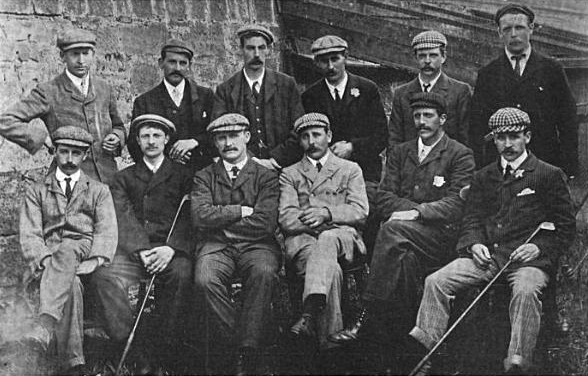
A group photo of the 1903 English golf team prior to their international match against Scotland. Vardon is seated in the front row, third from the right.

- Settle Golf Club, Settle, England (1895)
- Coventry Golf Club, Coventry, England (1911) - Course design Vardon, bunkers laid out by his brother Harry
- Kendal Golf Club, Kendal, England - alterations to the original layout
- St. Cloud Country Club, St. Cloud, Minnesota (1919)
- Vardon Golf Club, Minot, North Dakota (1929)
- Spooner Golf Club, Spooner, Wisconsin (1930)
- St. Augustines, Cliffsend, England (1907)
- Meadow Lark Country Club, Great Falls, Montana (1920)
- Stillwater Country Club, Stillwater, Minnesota (1924) - Vardon designed the original 9-hole course
- Strathpeffer Spa Golf Club, Strathpeffer, Scotland - added pot bunkers (1908)
- University of Minnesota, Les Bolstad Golf Course, Falcon Heights, Minnesota (1929)
- White Bear Yacht Club, White Bear Lake, Minnesota - Course design by William Watson, redevelopment by Vardon and Donald Ross
- Southview Country Club, West St. Paul, Minnesota (1919)
- Eau Claire Golf and Country Club (1928) - Tom Vardon and Charles H. Ramsdell.

== Death ==
Vardon died on 13 October 1938 in St. Paul, Minnesota.

== Legacy ==
Vardon was posthumously inducted into the Minnesota PGA Golf Hall of Fame in 2012.

== Results in major championships ==
Tournament	1891	1892	1893	1894	1895	1896	1897	1898	1899
The Open Championship	T10	12	T28	19	T9	10	T7		WD

Tournament	1900	1901	1902	1903	1904	1905	1906	1907	1908	1909	1910
The Open Championship	T10	WD	5	2	4	WD	T12	T3	T13	T19	WD

Note: Vardon only played in The Open Championship and the U.S. Open.

Top 10
Did not play

WD = Withdrew
"T" indicates a tie for a place

== Team appearances ==
- England–Scotland Professional Match (representing England): 1903, 1904 (tie), 1905 (tie), 1906 (winners), 1907 (winners), 1909 (winners), 1910 (winners)
