= 1904 News of the World Match Play =

Second News of the World Match Play tournament

Coordinates: 51°28′8″N 0°18′46″W

Tournament information
- Dates: 4–6 October 1904
- Location: Richmond, London, England
- Course: Mid-Surrey Golf Club
- Organised by: The PGA
- Format: Match play – 18 holes (Final 36 holes)

Statistics
- Field: 32 players
- Prize fund: £240
- Winner's share: £100

Champion
- (England) J.H. Taylor
- def. Alfred Toogood 5 & 3

Location in England

The 1904 News of the World Match Play was the second News of the World Match Play tournament. It was played from Tuesday 4 to Thursday 6 October at Mid-Surrey Golf Club. 32 players competed in a straight knock-out competition, with each match contested over 18 holes, except for the final which was over 36 holes. The winner received £100 out of a total prize fund of £240. J.H. Taylor defeated Alfred Toogood 5 & 3 in the final to win the tournament.

== Qualification ==
Entry was restricted to members of the Professional Golfers' Association (PGA). Qualification was by a series of 36-hole stroke-play competitions; one for each of the five PGA sections. The Southern section had 16 qualifiers, the Northern section had 6, the Midland 5, the Scottish section 3 and the Irish section 2. In the event of a tie for places there was a playoff. Compared to 1903 the Northern section had one additional qualifier and the Scottish section one less.

The qualifiers were:

- Irish section: George Coburn, Johnnie McKenna
- Midland section: George Cawsey, William Hutchings, Willie Lewis, Wilfrid Reid, Tom Williamson
- Northern section: Fred Collins, Phil Gaudin, Sandy Herd, George Pulford, Ted Ray, Tom Simpson
- Southern section: James Braid, Harry Chestney, Ernest Gray, James Hepburn, Willie Hunter, Sr., Rowland Jones, James Kinnell, Arthur Mitchell, Jack Ross, Jack Rowe, J.H. Taylor, Robert Thomson, Albert Tingey, Sr., Alfred Toogood, Harry Vardon, Tom Yeoman
- Scottish section: Willie Fernie, Arnaud Massy, Ben Sayers

== Format ==
The format was unchanged. Matches were over 18 holes except for the final which was over 36 holes. Extra holes were played in the event of a tied match. Two rounds were played on the first day, two more on the second day with the final on the third day.

== Results ==
First round 4 October
(England) Arthur Mitchell	1up
(England) Wilfrid Reid
(Scotland) James Hepburn	5&4
(Scotland) Jack Ross
(England) George Pulford	4&2
(England) Rowland Jones
(Scotland) Ben Sayers	w/o
(France) Arnaud Massy
(England) Alfred Toogood	4&3
(England) Harry Chestney
(England) Tom Simpson	2&1
(Scotland) Tom Yeoman
(Scotland) George Coburn
(Jersey) Ted Ray	3&2
(Scotland) Willie Fernie	4&3
(Scotland) Robert Thomson
(England) Albert Tingey, Sr.
(England) George Cawsey	3&2
(England) William Hutchings
(England) Willie Lewis	20h
(England) J.H. Taylor	2up
(Scotland) Willie Hunter, Sr.
(Ireland) Johnnie McKenna	4&3
(Scotland) James Kinnell
(England) Tom Williamson	4&3
(England) Jack Rowe
(Jersey) Harry Vardon	7&6
(England) Ernest Gray
(Scotland) Sandy Herd	5&4
(England) Fred Collins
(Jersey) Phil Gaudin
(Scotland) James Braid	5&4

Second round 4 October
(England) Arthur Mitchell
(Scotland) James Hepburn	1up
(England) George Pulford	5&4
(Scotland) Ben Sayers
(England) Alfred Toogood	2&1
(England) Tom Simpson
(Jersey) Ted Ray	5&4
(Scotland) Willie Fernie
(England) George Cawsey	2&1
(England) Willie Lewis
(England) J.H. Taylor	9&8
(Ireland) Johnnie McKenna
(England) Tom Williamson
(Jersey) Harry Vardon	1up
(Scotland) Sandy Herd	1up
(Scotland) James Braid

Third round 5 October
(Scotland) James Hepburn	3&2
(England) George Pulford
(England) Alfred Toogood	6&4
(Jersey) Ted Ray
(England) George Cawsey
(England) J.H. Taylor	4&3
(Jersey) Harry Vardon
(Scotland) Sandy Herd	19h

Semi-finals; 5 October
(Scotland) James Hepburn
(England) Alfred Toogood	4&2
(England) J.H. Taylor	1up
(Scotland) Sandy Herd

Final; 6 October
(England) Alfred Toogood
(England) J.H. Taylor	5&3

w/o = Walkover

== Prize money ==
Prize money was increased to £240 with the addition of 8 £5 prizes for the losers in the second round. The winner received £100 and a gold medal, the runner-up £30 and a silver medal, the losing semi-finalists £15 and a bronze medal, while the third round losers received £10 and the second round losers received £5.
