= 1903 News of the World Match Play =

First News of the World Match Play tournament

Coordinates: 51°23′17″N 0°37′52″W

Tournament information
- Dates: 13–15 October 1903
- Location: Sunningdale, Berkshire, England
- Course: Sunningdale Golf Club
- Organised by: The PGA
- Format: Match play – 18 holes (Final 36 holes)

Statistics
- Field: 32 players
- Prize fund: £200
- Winner's share: £100

Champion
- (Scotland) James Braid
- def. Ted Ray 4 & 3

Location in England

The 1903 News of the World Match Play was the first News of the World Match Play tournament. It was played from Tuesday 13 to Thursday 15 October at Sunningdale Golf Club. 32 players competed in a straight knock-out competition, with each match contested over 18 holes, except for the final which was over 36 holes. The winner received £100 out of a total prize fund of £200. James Braid defeated Ted Ray 4 & 3 in the final to win the tournament.

== Qualification ==
Entry was restricted to members of the Professional Golfers' Association (PGA). Qualification was by a series of 36-hole stroke-play competitions; one for each of the five PGA sections. The number of qualifiers from each section was based on the membership of that section. The Southern section had 16 qualifiers, the Midland and Northern sections had 5 each, the Scottish section 4 and the Irish section 2. In the event of a tie for places there was a playoff.

The Northern section held their qualification at Huddersfield on 22 September with Ted Ray winning with a score of 148. The Scottish section qualification was the following day at Earlsferry with Robert Thomson winning with a score of 153. Arnaud Massy failed to qualify, The Irish section played on 24 September at Lahinch with George Coburn winning with a score of 157. The Southern section played on 29 September at Acton with J.H. Taylor winning with a score of 140. There was a tie for the final two places and there was a 36-hole play-off the following day. The Midland section played on 7 October at Hollinwell with Tom Williamson winning with a score of 151. Harry Vardon was ill and did not enter.

The qualifiers were:

- Northern section: Sandy Herd, Ted Ray, Tom Simpson, Alfred Toogood, Walter Toogood
- Scottish section: Willie Fernie, James Forrester, Andrew Scott, Robert Thomson
- Irish section: George Coburn, Willie MacNamara
- Southern section: James Braid, George Carter, Harry Cawsey, Arthur Gray, James Hepburn, David Herd, Rowland Jones, John Milne, Arthur Mitchell, Jack Ross, Jack Rowe, Ralph Smith, J.H. Taylor, Tom Vardon, Jack White, Philip Wynne
- Midland section: John Clucas, William Jeffries, James Sherlock, Billy Whiting, Tom Williamson

== Format ==
The matches were over 18 holes except for the final which was over 36 holes. Extra holes were played in the event of a tied match. Two rounds were played on the first day, two more on the second day with the final on the third day.

== Results ==
First round 13 October
(England) Arthur Gray	3&1
(Ireland) Willie MacNamara
(England) Tom Simpson
(England) J.H. Taylor	3&1
(Scotland) John Milne
(Scotland) Andrew Scott	3&2
(Scotland) Sandy Herd	7&6
(England) George Carter
(England) Walter Toogood
(Scotland) James Hepburn	2up
(Scotland) Jack Ross
(Scotland) James Braid	6&5
(England) Harry Cawsey
(England) Alfred Toogood	4&3
(Scotland) Jack White
(England) Tom Williamson	1up
(Isle of Man) John Clucas
(Scotland) James Forrester	2&1
(Scotland) Robert Thomson	4&3
(Scotland) Ralph Smith
(England) William Jeffries
(Scotland) George Coburn	3&2
(England) James Sherlock
(Scotland) Willie Fernie	19h
(Jersey) Ted Ray	3&2
(England) Jack Rowe
(Jersey) Tom Vardon	3&2
(Ireland) Philip Wynne
(England) Billy Whiting
(England) Rowland Jones	6&4
(England) Arthur Mitchell
(Scotland) David Herd	1up

Second round 13 October
(England) Arthur Gray
(England) J.H. Taylor	2&1
(Scotland) Andrew Scott
(Scotland) Sandy Herd	4&3
(Scotland) James Hepburn
(Scotland) James Braid	5&4
(England) Alfred Toogood	1up
(England) Tom Williamson
(Scotland) James Forrester	2&1
(Scotland) Robert Thomson
(Scotland) George Coburn	4&3
(Scotland) Willie Fernie
(Jersey) Ted Ray	7&5
(Jersey) Tom Vardon
(England) Rowland Jones	7&5
(Scotland) David Herd

Third round 14 October
(England) J.H. Taylor	3&1
(Scotland) Sandy Herd
(Scotland) James Braid	19h
(England) Alfred Toogood
(Scotland) James Forrester
(Scotland) George Coburn	5&4
(Jersey) Ted Ray	2&1
(England) Rowland Jones

Semi-finals; 14 October
(England) J.H. Taylor
(Scotland) James Braid	4&2
(Scotland) George Coburn
(Jersey) Ted Ray	4&3

Final; 15 October
(Scotland) James Braid	4&3
(Jersey) Ted Ray

== Prize money ==
The winner received £100 and a gold medal, the runner-up £30 and a silver medal, the losing semi-finalists £15 and a bronze medal, while the third round losers received £10, making a total prize fund of £200.
