= 1909 News of the World Match Play =

Seventh News of the World Match Play golf tournament

Coordinates: 51°16′40″N 0°14′45″W

Tournament information
- Dates: 5–7 October 1909
- Location: Walton-on-the-Hill, Surrey, England
- Course: Walton Heath Golf Club
- Organised by: The PGA
- Format: Match play – 18 holes (Final 36 holes)

Statistics
- Field: 32 players
- Prize fund: £240
- Winner's share: £100

Champion
- (England) Tom Ball
- def. Sandy Herd 7 & 5

Location in England

The 1909 News of the World Match Play was the seventh News of the World Match Play tournament. It was played from Tuesday 5 to Thursday 7 October at Walton Heath Golf Club. 32 players competed in a straight knock-out competition, with each match contested over 18 holes, except for the final which was over 36 holes. The winner received £100 out of a total prize fund of £240. Tom Ball defeated Sandy Herd 7 & 5 in the final to win the tournament.

== Qualification ==
Entry was restricted to members of the Professional Golfers' Association (PGA). Qualification was by a series of 36-hole stroke-play competitions; one for each of the seven PGA sections. The Southern section had 13 qualifiers, the Northern section 7, the Midland and the Scottish sections 4, the Irish section 2 and the Welsh and Western sections 1. Compared to 1908 one entry was allocated to the new Western section with the number of qualifiers from the Southern section reduced to 13. In the event of a tie for places there was a playoff.

The qualifiers were:

- Irish section: Michael Moran, Alex Robertson
- Midland section: George Coburn, Frank Coltart, Alfred Lewis, Tom Williamson
- Northern section: Tom Ball, Sandy Herd, Peter McEwan Jr., Ted Ray, Herbert Riseborough, Fred Robson, Tom Simpson
- Southern section: James Batley, James Braid, Arthur Butchart, George Carter, James Hepburn, Charles Johns, Charles Mayo, Arthur Mitchell, Wilfrid Reid, Jack Rowe, James Sherlock, J.H. Taylor, Harry Vardon
- Scottish section: Willie Binnie, David Kinnell, Robert Thomson, Willie Watt
- Western section: Ernest Foord
- Welsh section: Jack Ross

== Format ==
The format was unchanged. Matches were over 18 holes except for the final which was over 36 holes. Extra holes were played in the event of a tied match. Two rounds were played on the first day, two more on the second day with the final on the third day.

== Results ==
First round 5 October
(Scotland) Arthur Butchart	4&3
(England) Ernest Foord
(Scotland) Willie Watt
(Scotland) Sandy Herd	6&5
(England) Herbert Riseborough	3&2
(Scotland) David Kinnell
(England) Charles Mayo	3&2
(England) Tom Simpson
(England) George Carter
(Jersey) Ted Ray	1up
(Scotland) Frank Coltart	2up
(England) Arthur Mitchell
(Scotland) Robert Thomson
(Jersey) Harry Vardon	4&3
(Scotland) Peter McEwan Jr.	1up
(Ireland) Alex Robertson
(Scotland) Jack Ross
(England) Fred Robson	19h
(Scotland) George Coburn
(England) Tom Ball	3&2
(Scotland) James Braid
(England) Jack Rowe	4&3
(England) Alfred Lewis
(England) James Sherlock	1up
(Ireland) Michael Moran
(England) Charles Johns	2&1
(Scotland) Willie Binnie
(England) Wilfrid Reid	5&3
(England) Tom Williamson	4&3
(England) James Batley
(Scotland) James Hepburn	20h
(England) J.H. Taylor

Second round 5 October
(Scotland) Arthur Butchart
(Scotland) Sandy Herd	5&4
(England) Herbert Riseborough
(England) Charles Mayo	21h
(Jersey) Ted Ray
(Scotland) Frank Coltart	1up
(Jersey) Harry Vardon	2&1
(Scotland) Peter McEwan Jr.
(England) Fred Robson
(England) Tom Ball	2&1
(England) Jack Rowe	2&1
(England) James Sherlock
(England) Charles Johns	19h
(England) Wilfrid Reid
(England) Tom Williamson
(Scotland) James Hepburn	1up

Third round 6 October
(Scotland) Sandy Herd	5&3
(England) Charles Mayo
(Scotland) Frank Coltart
(Jersey) Harry Vardon	5&4
(England) Tom Ball	3&2
(England) Jack Rowe
(England) Charles Johns
(Scotland) James Hepburn	2&1

Semi-finals; 6 October
(Scotland) Sandy Herd	1up
(Jersey) Harry Vardon
(England) Tom Ball	5&4
(Scotland) James Hepburn

Final; 7 October
(Scotland) Sandy Herd
(England) Tom Ball	7&5

== Prize money ==
The winner received £100 and a gold medal, the runner-up £30 and a silver medal, the losing semi-finalists £15 and a bronze medal, while the third round losers received £10 and the second round losers received £5.
