= Michael Moran (golfer) =

Irish professional golfer (1886–1918)

Personal information
- Nickname: Dyke
- Nationality: Ireland
- Born: 6 May 1886 Bull Island, Dublin, Ireland
- Died: 10 April 1918 (aged 31) Le Cateau, France

Career
- Sport: Golf
- Status: Professional
- Professional wins: 6

Best results in major championships
- Masters Tournament: DNP
- PGA Championship: DNP
- U.S. Open: DNP
- The Open Championship: T3: 1913

Michael Moran (6 May 1886 – 10 April 1918) was an Irish professional golfer, the leading Irish golfer of his generation. He won the Irish Professional Championship five years in succession from 1909 to 1913 before moving to England and being ineligible to compete in 1914. He played in the Open Championship from 1909 to 1914 with a series of high finishes. He finished joint third in 1913 despite a disastrous 89 in the third round which included a 10 at the first hole. He died in France in 1918 at the age of 31.

== Early life ==
Moran won born on 6 May 1886 on Bull Island, Dublin the son of Michael and Catherine (née Curley). The house where he was born was close to Royal Dublin links.

== Golf career ==
Moran played in the first Irish Professional Championship which was played on Monday 20 and Tuesday 21 May 1907 at Royal Portrush Golf Club. At this time Moran was at Dundalk Golf Club. An Ireland–Scotland Professional Match was played on the prior Saturday, 18 May. On the day before the international, a 36-hole stroke-play competition was arranged for the Irish and Scottish professionals, Moran winning by four strokes from Bertie Snowball. In the international, Moran won his singles match but, playing with Alfred Toogood, lost his foursomes. Ireland won by 13 matches to 4. In the championship Moran was one of the leading 8 who qualified, through an 18-hole stroke-play contest, for the knockout match-play stage. He reached the semi-finals where he lost to Bertie Snowball by 1 hole.

By April 1909 Moran had returned to Royal Dublin and was sufficiently well known that an exhibition match against Irish Professional Champion James Edmundson was arranged at Dollymount. The 36-hole match was halved. The 1909 Irish Professional Championship was played two weeks later at Royal County Down Golf Club. Moran and Edmundson tied again in the 36-hole stroke-play stage with scores of 167. Moran met Harry Kidd in the 36-hole final, Edmundson losing in the quarter-finals. Moran started badly and was 3 down after 6 holes. However, he then won the next 6 holes and was 2 up after the first round. Moran won the first hole in the afternoon and from the 5th to the 11th holes won 6 more to win easily 9&7. Moran made two trips to England in 1909. In June he played in the Open Championship at Deal, Kent. He qualified easily, scoring 153, joint fifth in his half of the draw. He had a bad first day in the championship, scoring 82 and 81, but rounds of 74 and 77 on the final day lifted him into a tie for 21st place. He also won the Irish section qualifying for the News of the World Match Play and travelled to Walton Heath in October. He met Charles Johns in the first round and lost 2&1. In September he had played Harry Vardon in a 36-hole challenge match at the new Delgany course. The match was close but Vardon won 3&2.

From 1910 the Irish Professional Championship became a 72-hole stroke-play event. It was played in early June at Royal Dublin Golf Club. Moran pulled 7 ahead at the end of the first day after a second round 72, a course record. On the second day Moran set another course record of 70, extending his lead to 13. A final round of 76 gave him a 10 stroke win over Michael Cahill and 23 ahead of the rest of the field. Later in June he travelled to St Andrews for the Open Championship. There was no qualifying and everyone played one round on each of the first two days. Moran had rounds of 77 and 75 to tie for fourth place at the halfway stage. On the final day he had rounds of 79 and 81 to drop into a tie for 14th place. The main domestic event of 1910 was the Portmarnock Professional Tournament, played in early July. This had prize money of £250 and attracted most of the leading British professionals. The field of about 70 was reduced to 32 through a 36-hole stroke-play contest after which there was a match-play contest on the remaining three days. Moran had a first round 89 and only just qualified. He won his two matches on the second day, including a surprise win over Ted Ray in the last-16 round. On the following day Moran, the last remaining Irishman, lost 2&1 in the quarter-final to George Duncan. Moran failed to qualify for the News of the World Match Play. Only one Irish golfer qualified and Moran lost in a playoff to Hugh McNeill.

Moran won his third Irish Professional Championship in early June 1911 at Royal Portrush Golf Club. He led after the first day on 159, three ahead of James Edmundson. In the third round Edmundson scored 75 to Moran's 78 to be on level terms. Moran then scored a final round 72 to Edmundson's 78 to win by six strokes. Later in June Moran travelled to Royal St George's for the Open Championship. The Championship was preceded by a "Coronation Match" between teams of amateurs and professionals, in celebration of the coronation of George V. Moran was selected for the professionals, joined by the amateur Lionel Munn as the Irish representatives. The match consisted of 9 foursomes matches, each over 36 holes. The result was an 8–1 win for the professionals. Moran and his partner Rowland Jones were the only professionals who lost, at the 38th hole. The 1911 Open was the last without any qualifying, and, with 222 players, the first two rounds were spread over three days. There was considerable disquiet about the format, since some of the holes were moved every day. Moran scored 72 to lead after the first day, although Edward Blackwell scored 71 on the second day, playing to different holes. After his good first round, Moran disappointed and finished tied for 21st place. Moran failed to qualify for the final stages of either of the main PGA events. A poor first round of 81 meant he missed out on the two Irish places in the Sphere and Tatler Foursomes Tournament. In the qualifying for the News of the World Match Play, Moran was involved in a three-man playoff for the one place, but missed out, as he had in 1910.

The 1912 Irish Professional Championship was played in early May at Castlerock Golf Club. Pat Doyle led after the first day on 152, having set a course record of 72 in his afternoon round. Moran was three behind on 155. Moran scored 75 in the third round to Doyle's 82 to take a 4 stroke lead. Another 75 from Moran gave him a 6 shot win over Doyle who finished with a 77. Qualifying was reintroduced for the 1912 Open Championship. Moran played on the second day of qualifying, finishing tied for second place. Moran had four steady rounds and finished tied for 15th place. Moran won the Irish section qualifying for the News of the World Match Play at Portmarnock after a playoff against Pat O'Hara. Moran lost in the first round to Harry Cawsey.

The 1913 Open Championship was held on 23 and 24 June at Royal Liverpool Golf Club in Hoylake. Moran played on the second day of qualifying, finishing tied for third place after rounds of 77 and 74. In the championship itself, he had rounds of 76 and 74 on the first day to lie in third place overnight, three off the lead. Gale-force winds on the second day led to high scoring in the final two rounds. Moran had a disastrous start to his third round, taking 10 at the first hole. He went out of bounds and then took four shots to get out of a bunker. Moran continued to struggle, taking 5 at the second and 7 at the third. He was out in 48 and finished with an 89, to lie 14 strokes behind the leader. In the afternoon Moran had an excellent round of 74, the best round of the day and 15 strokes better than his morning round. This lifted him into a tie for third place with Harry Vardon, although a distant 9 behind the winner, J.H. Taylor.

The 1913 Irish Professional Championship was played on 31 July and 1 August at Portmarnock Golf Club. After two rounds Hugh McNeill led on 163, ahead of Pat O'Hare on 164. Moran was tied for fifth after a second round 88. After a third round 79 O'Hare had a lead of 5 strokes from McNeill and Charlie Pope, with Moran a further shot back. McNeill and Pope faded in the final round, while O'Hare and Moran both took 39 for the front nine. O'Hare then took 7 at the 10th and 11th and came home in 44 to Moran's 36 to give Moran a two stroke victory and his fifth successive title. Moran won the Irish section qualifying for the News of the World Match Play for the second successive year. Played at Royal County Down, Moran won by 2 strokes on 152. He met James Bradbeer in the first round and lost at the 20th hole. The Irish section of the PGA organised a professional foursomes tournament at Royal Dublin in December 1913. Moran played with Fred Smith. After a close first-round match, Moran and Smith reached the 36-hole final which they won by one hole.

In late 1913 it was announced that Moran was leaving Royal Dublin Golf Club to be professional at Wearside Golf Club at Cox Green, Sunderland from January 1914. The move did not, however, take place, Wearside appointing James MacKenzie, the professional at nearby Seaham Harbour, in early 1914. It was almost immediately announced that Moran would replace MacKenzie at Seaham Harbour, County Durham. Having failed to reach the final stage of the Sphere and Tatler Foursomes Tournament in its first three years, Moran finally succeeded through the Northern section qualifying, an event that also incorporated the Leeds Cup. Moran was drawn with Thomas Renouf, who had won the Leeds Cup. They won their first two matches but lost in the quarter-finals. In early June Moran played in the Cruden Bay Professional Tournament. He qualified comfortably, as one of the leading 16 after the 36-hole stroke-play stage, before losing 4&3 to Harry Vardon in the quarter-finals. Moran played in the Open Championship later that month. He qualified comfortably but had three disappointing rounds before a final round 76 lifted him into a tie for 25th place.

== War service and death ==
Moran joined the South Irish Horse in late 1915. In September 1917 the officers and men of the South Irish Horse were retrained as infantry and formed 7th (South Irish Horse) Battalion Royal Irish Regiment. The battalion was caught in the German spring offensive in March 1918. The Official History records that, "two companies of 7th Battalion Royal Irish Regiment, posted in forward zones, suffered terribly; not a man succeeded in escaping."

Moran was wounded and transferred to Le Cateau hospital where he died on 10 April 1918. Le Cateau was the site of an important German hospital centre. Since he had died in a German hospital, news of his death was delayed and it was not announced until 16 December, a month after the war had finished.

== Professional wins (6) ==
- 1909 Irish Professional Championship
- 1910 Irish Professional Championship
- 1911 Irish Professional Championship
- 1912 Irish Professional Championship
- 1913 Irish Professional Championship, Irish Professional Foursomes (with Fred Smith)

== Results in major championships ==
Tournament	1909	1910	1911	1912	1913	1914
The Open Championship	T21	T14	T21	T15	T3	T25

Note: Moran only played in The Open Championship.

Top 10

"T" indicates a tie for a place

== Team appearances ==
- Ireland–Scotland Professional Match (representing Ireland): 1907 (winners)
- Coronation Match (representing the Professionals): 1911 (winners)

== Sources ==
- Walker, Stephen (2015). "Ireland's Lost Champion". Ireland's Call: Irish Sporting Heroes Who Fell in the Great War. Merrion Press. ISBN 978-1-78537-018-2.
