= Bramshot Cup =

Tournament information
- Location: Fleet, Hampshire, England
- Established: 1910
- Course(s): Bramshot Golf Club
- Final year: 1911

Final champion
- Harry Vardon

Location in England

The Bramshot Cup was an annual professional golf tournament played at Bramshot Golf Club, Hampshire in 1910 and 1911. For financial reasons the tournament folded in 1912.

== History ==
The Bramshot club had opened for play in 1905. In 1910 the club organised its first professional tournament intended to be an annual event. The winner received the "Bramshot Cup", a challenge cup donated by Gordon Watney and each year he donated a replica for the winning professional to keep.

=== 1910 ===
The tournament was played on 24 May 1910 and consisted of 36 holes of stroke play. 36 professionals entered. The winner received £20 out of total prize money of £80. Ted Ray had rounds of 73 and 70 to win by 6 strokes from James Hepburn. Charles Johns was a further 4 shots behind. the Bramshot professional, Tom Ball, disappointed with rounds of 77 and 80. A number of the leading players did not compete, some having alternative arrangements.

=== 1911 ===
The second tournament was played on 10 May 1911 and again consisted of 36 holes of stroke play. There were again 36 professionals playing and total prize money remained unchanged at £80. Harry Vardon had rounds of 74 and 72 to win by 2 strokes from Fred Robson with four players, including Tom Ball, a further 3 shots behind.

=== 1912 ===
In early 1912 the proprietor of the Bramshot club, Captain Walter Seton, gave up his lease and the club was taken over by its members. The new members decided not to donate the prize money in 1912 and the tournament was not held. Captain Seton died later in 1912 aged 47.

=== 1920 ===
On 15 May 1920 the Bramshot club organised an event for 24 leading players including the local professional Jack Sidey. The professionals played 18 holes of singles in the morning and 18 holes of four-balls in the afternoon. There was also a long-driving competition. Harry Vardon won the singles with a score of 73, a shot ahead of J.H. Taylor. The four-ball resulted in a tie between James Braid/James Sherlock and Abe Mitchell/Tom Williamson, both pairs scoring 69. Ted Ray won the driving competition with a drive of 273 yards.

== Winners ==
Year	Winners	Country	Score	Margin of victory	Runner-up	Winner's share (£)	Ref
1910	Ted Ray	Jersey	143	6 strokes	(Scotland) James Hepburn	20	
1911	Harry Vardon	Jersey	146	2 strokes	(England) Fred Robson		
