= 1908 Open Championship =

Coordinates: 55.502°N 4.619°W

Tournament information
- Dates: 18–19 June 1908
- Location: Prestwick, South Ayrshire, Scotland
- Course: Prestwick Golf Club

Statistics
- Field: 65 players
- Cut: none
- Prize fund: £115
- Winner's share: £50

Champion
- (Scotland) James Braid
- 291

Location in Scotland
Location in South Ayrshire, Scotland

The 1908 Open Championship was the 48th Open Championship, held 18–19 June at Prestwick Golf Club in Prestwick, South Ayrshire, Scotland. James Braid won the Championship for the fourth time, eight strokes ahead of runner-up Tom Ball.

Qualifying took place on Tuesday and Wednesday, 16–17 June, and the players were divided into two "sections." Those in the first section played on the first morning and second afternoon while those in the second section played on the first afternoon and second morning. After the 36 holes the leading thirty players and ties qualified from each section. The qualifying score of 163 was the same in both sections, and 65 players qualified. J.H. Taylor led the first section with a score of 150 while the Scottish amateur Robert Andrew led the second section with the same score.

The first round on Thursday morning was noted for its low scoring, especially on the first nine holes. Ernest Gray, from Littlehampton, went out in 31 and equalled J.H. Taylor's record score of 68 set at Royal St George's in 1904. Braid finished with a 70 after going out in 33, with Fred Robson in third place after a 72. Ben Sayers was amongst those in fourth place on 74 after he too went out in 33. In the afternoon, Gray was eleven shots worse with a round in 79, while Braid added a 72 to lead by five strokes from Gray, with Sandy Herd and David Kinnell a further stroke behind. Braid again played the front nine in 33, and although he took six at the 13th, he had a comfortable lead at the end of the day.

On Friday morning, Braid began the third round badly. After taking five at the first hole, he followed with an eight at the third. Despite slicing his tee shot into the rough he tried to carry the Cardinal Bunker but failed. His bunker shot hit the sleepers and went out of bounds. After dropping in the bunker, he hit the sleepers again, this time landing further back in the bunker. He finally escaped the bunker, played a further shot to the green and two-putted for an eight. Under modern rules, he would have scored nine, but at the time there was no penalty stroke for "out of bounds." After this, he recovered well and finished with a 77, only three strokes worse than the best rounds of the morning. With Gray taking 83 and Herd coming back in 45, Braid, on 219, had extended his lead to six strokes over Ball and Ted Ray.

Braid had a final round of 72, the best of the afternoon to win by eight shots. His total of 291 was an Open Championship record, beating Jack White's 296 in 1904. After poor scores on the first day, Harry Vardon and Taylor were amongst the best scorers on the second day and finished in ties for fifth and seventh places.

== Round summaries ==
=== First round ===
Thursday, 18 June 1908 (morning)

Place	Player	Score
1	(England) Ernest Gray	68
2	(Scotland) James Braid	70
3	(England) Fred Robson	72
T4	(England) John Ball (a)	74
T4	(Scotland) Sandy Herd	74
T4	(Scotland) Ben Sayers	74
T6	(England) Rowland Jones	75
T6	(Scotland) David Kinnell	75
T6	(England) Tom Simpson	75
T9	(England) Tom Ball	76
T9	(Scotland) John Graham Jr.	76
T9	(France) Arnaud Massy	76
T9	(Scotland) Willie McEwan	76
T9	(England) Albert Tingey Sr.	76

=== Second round ===
Thursday, 18 June 1908 (afternoon)

Place	Player	Score
1	(Scotland) James Braid	70-72=142
2	(England) Ernest Gray	68-79=147
T3	(Scotland) Sandy Herd	74-74=148
T3	(Scotland) David Kinnell	75-73=148
5	(England) Tom Ball	76-73=149
T6	(England) Rowland Jones	75-75=150
T6	(Jersey) Ted Ray	79-71=150
T6	(Scotland) Ben Sayers	74-76=150
T9	(France) Arnaud Massy	76-75=151
T9	(England) Fred Robson	72-79=151

=== Third round ===
Friday, 19 June 1908 (morning)

Place	Player	Score
1	(Scotland) James Braid	70-72-77=219
T2	(England) Tom Ball	76-73-76=225
T2	(Jersey) Ted Ray	79-71-75=225
T4	(Scotland) Sandy Herd	74-74-79=227
T4	(France) Arnaud Massy	76-75-76=227
T6	(Ireland) James Edmundson	80-72-76=228
T6	(Jersey) Phil Gaudin	77-76-75=228
T6	(Scotland) David Kinnell	75-73-80=228
T6	(England) Tom Simpson	75-77-76=228
10	(England) John Ball (a)	74-78-78=230

=== Final round ===
Friday, 19 June 1908

Place	Player	Score	Money (£)
1	(Scotland) James Braid	70-72-77-72=291	50
2	(England) Tom Ball	76-73-76-74=299	25
3	(Jersey) Ted Ray	79-71-75-76=301	15
4	(Scotland) Sandy Herd	74-74-79-75=302	10
T5	(Scotland) David Kinnell	75-73-80-78=306	7; 10s
T5	(Jersey) Harry Vardon	79-78-74-75=306	7; 10s
T7	(England) Tom Simpson	75-77-76-79=307	0
T7	(England) J.H. Taylor	79-77-76-75=307	0
T9	(Jersey) Phil Gaudin	77-76-75-80=308	0
T9	(France) Arnaud Massy	76-75-76-81=308	0
