= 1911 Open Championship =

Coordinates: 51.274°N 1.367°E

Tournament information
- Dates: 26–30 June 1911
- Location: Sandwich, England
- Course: Royal St George's Golf Club

Statistics
- Length: 6,587 yards (6,023 m)
- Field: 226 players, 73 after cut
- Cut: 162
- Prize fund: £125
- Winner's share: £50

Champion
- (Jersey) Harry Vardon
- 303, playoff

Location in England
Location in Kent. England

The 1911 Open Championship was the 51st Open Championship, held 26–30 June at Royal St George's Golf Club in Sandwich, England. Harry Vardon won the Championship for the fifth time in a playoff over Arnaud Massy, the 1907 champion.

There was no qualifying event and with 226 entries it was not possible for all the players to play 18 holes on the same day. The players were therefore divided into three "sections," with the first 36 holes played over three days. Sections A and B played their first rounds on Monday, while section C played on Tuesday morning. Section A played their second rounds that afternoon, while sections B and C played their second rounds on Wednesday.

By the start of the first round, the number of participants had been reduced to 222, with four withdrawals. On Monday, Michael Moran of Section B had the best round at 72. On Tuesday morning, the players in Section C discovered that a number of the holes had been moved since the first day. Later in the day a letter of protest was drawn up by a group of professionals and presented to the authorities: "To the Committee of the Championship, 1911 - Gentlemen, we the undersigned competitors at this Championship meeting respectfully protest against the alteration of the course during the qualifying (sic) rounds." Play was somewhat easier on the second morning and amateur Edward Blackwell led at 71, with by J.H. Taylor. joining Moran with 72.

At the end of Tuesday, only Section A had completed 36 holes, and Ted Ray led at 148. The Committee replied to the professionals, "The Green Committee consider that in deciding to cut fresh holes each day they had adopted the best course possible under the terms of the competition, which were exceptional owing to the large entry, and though they regret that there was any dissatisfaction amongst the players, they decided that the protest could not be upheld." New holes were again cut on the third morning, so that Sections B and C played their second round to different holes to Section A.

The second round was completed on Wednesday evening, and George Duncan led the field at 144, four ahead of Ray, Taylor, and Vardon. The leading sixty players and ties advanced for the final 36 holes on Thursday; the cut was at 162 and 73 players advanced, with fifteen players on the number.

Duncan had a poor third round of 83 in the morning, which left Vardon with a three-shot lead over Sandy Herd, Taylor, and Massy.

Vardon was among the early starters in the afternoon and scored 80 for 303. Amateur Harold Hilton reached the turn in 33, but took 43 for the last nine and finished a shot behind. Massy needed a four at the difficult final hole to tie; he reached the green with two woods and two-putted to force a 36-hole playoff with Vardon on Friday.

Massy led the playoff after ten holes, but a six at the 14th and a disastrous seven at 17 put Vardon ahead by five after the first round. The lead extended to seven after 27 holes and ten after 34 holes. After Vardon reached the green in two at the 35th and Massy was in thick rough after two shots, Massy picked up his ball and conceded.

== Coronation Match ==
The Championship was preceded by a "Coronation Match" between teams of amateurs and professionals at Royal St George's on Saturday 24 June 1911. The match was in celebration of the coronation of George V on 22 June 1911. The match consisted of 9 foursomes matches, each over 36 holes. The result was an 8–1 win for the professionals. Only one match went beyond the 33rd hole and resulted in a win for the amateurs at the 38th hole.

== Course ==
Hole	Yards	Hole	Yards
1	400	10	365
2	312	11	380
3	250	12	370
4	425	13	431
5	390	14	505
6	160	15	433
7	506	16	160
8	220	17	400
9	420	18	460
Out	3,083	In	3,504
Source:		Total	6,587

== Round summaries ==
=== First round ===
Monday, 26 June 1911 (morning, section A; afternoon, section B)
Tuesday, 27 June 1911 (morning, section C)

Place	Player	Score	Section
1	(Scotland) Edward Blackwell (a)	71	C
T2	(Ireland) Michael Moran	72	B
T2	(England) J.H. Taylor	72	C
T4	(Scotland) George Duncan	73	C
T4	(England) James Sherlock	73	B
T6	(Scotland) James Hepburn	74	C
T6	(England) William Horne	74	C
T6	(England) Jack Rowe	74	C
T6	(Jersey) Harry Vardon	74	C
T10	(England) Harold Beveridge (a)	75	B
T10	(England) Horace Fulford	75	C
T10	(England) Fred Leach	75	C
T10	(England) James Ockenden	75	A
T10	(Jersey) Thomas Renouf	75	C

=== Second round ===
Tuesday, 27 June 1911 (afternoon, section A)
Wednesday, 28 June 1911 (morning, section B; afternoon, section C)

Place	Player	Score	Section
1	(Scotland) George Duncan	73-71=144	C
T2	(Jersey) Ted Ray	76-72=148	A
T2	(England) J.H. Taylor	72-76=148	C
T2	(Jersey) Harry Vardon	74-74=148	C
T5	(Scotland) Sandy Herd	77-73=150	B
T5	(England) Harold Hilton (a)	76-74=150	A
T5	(England) William Horne	74-76=150	C
T5	(Ireland) Michael Moran	72-78=150	B
T9	(Scotland) James Hepburn	74-77=151	C
T9	(Jersey) Thomas Renouf	75-76=151	C

=== Third round ===
Thursday, 29 June 1911 (morning)

Place	Player	Score
1	(Jersey) Harry Vardon	74-74-75=223
T2	(Scotland) Sandy Herd	77-73-76=226
T2	(England) J.H. Taylor	72-76-78=226
T4	(Scotland) James Braid	78-75-74=227
T4	(Scotland) George Duncan	73-71-83=227
T4	(France) Arnaud Massy	75-78-74=227
T4	(Jersey) Ted Ray	76-72-79=227
8	(England) Harold Hilton (a)	76-74-78=228
T9	(Scotland) Laurie Ayton, Snr	75-77-77=229
T9	(England) James Sherlock	73-80-76=229

=== Final round ===
Thursday, 29 June 1911 (afternoon)

Place	Player	Score	Money (£)
T1	(France) Arnaud Massy	75-78-74-76=303	Playoff
T1	(Jersey) Harry Vardon	74-74-75-80=303	Playoff
T3	(Scotland) Sandy Herd	77-73-76-78=304	15
T3	(England) Harold Hilton (a)	76-74-78-76=304	0
T5	(Scotland) James Braid	78-75-74-78=305	8; 6s 8d
T5	(Jersey) Ted Ray	76-72-79-78=305	8; 6s 8d
T5	(England) J.H. Taylor	72-76-78-79=305	8; 6s 8d
8	(Scotland) George Duncan	73-71-83-79=306	5
9	(Scotland) Laurie Ayton, Snr	75-77-77-78=307	5
T10	(Scotland) James Hepburn	74-77-83-75=309	0
T10	(England) Fred Robson	78-74-79-78=309	0

=== Playoff ===
Friday, 30 June 1911

Ten shots behind after 34 holes, Massy was in trouble on the 35th hole and conceded the match. Scores in the table below are after 34 holes.

Place	Player	Score	Money (£)
1	(Jersey) Harry Vardon	74-64=138; 34 holes	50
2	(France) Arnaud Massy	79-69=148; Conceded	25

==== Scorecards ====
Morning round

Hole	1	2	3	4	5	6	7	8	9	Out	10	11	12	13	14	15	16	17	18	Back	Total
(Jersey) Vardon	4	4	3	4	5	4	5	3	4	36	5	4	5	4	4	4	3	4	5	38	74
(France) Massy	4	4	4	4	5	4	4	3	4	36	4	5	5	4	6	4	3	7	5	43	79

Afternoon round

Hole	1	2	3	4	5	6	7	8	9	Out	10	11	12	13	14	15	16	17	18	Back	Total
(Jersey) Vardon	4	5	4	3	4	3	5	3	5	36	4	4	4	5	4	5	2	–	–	28	64
(France) Massy	5	4	3	5	5	3	5	4	4	38	4	6	4	5	5	4	3	–	–	31	69
