= Tooting Bec Cup =

Golf competition

The Tooting Bec Cup is a trophy currently awarded by the Professional Golfers' Association of Great Britain and Ireland to the association member born in, or with a parent or parents born in, the United Kingdom or Republic of Ireland who returns the lowest single-round score in The Open Championship.

Inaugurated in 1901 the Tooting Bec Challenge Cup was originally a separate competition. From 1910 it was awarded to the winner of a southern section qualifying competition for a major tournament and then since 1924 it has been awarded to the best round in The Open Championship by a British or Irish member of the PGA. It is the PGA's oldest trophy, predating the northern section's Leeds Cup which was first contested in 1902.

== History ==
The Tooting Bec Challenge Cup was originally a 36-hole stroke play tournament organised by the London and Counties Professional Golfers' Association, the forerunner of the Professional Golfers' Association. The tournament was held on 15 October 1901 at the Tooting Bec Golf Club, Furzedown and the cup was donated by the Tooting Bec club. Of the 50 members who entered 46 played. J.H. Taylor won the event and was presented with the cup by the club captain, Norman Bailey. With the formation of the PGA in late 1901, the cup became an event organised by the southern section of the PGA.

Since 1924, it has not been a standalone tournament, and the trophy has been awarded to the PGA member from the United Kingdom or Republic of Ireland who records the lowest single-round score in the Open. The precise qualification rule has varied. Henry Cotton did not receive it in 1934, despite his rounds of 65 and 67, because at the time the award went "to the member of P.G.A. living in Great Britain who accomplishes the best single round during the championship" and Cotton was then living in Belgium.

== Winners ==
Year	Player(s)	Score
2024	Shane Lowry	66
2023	Tommy Fleetwood	66
2022	Rory McIlroy	66
2022	Matt Fitzpatrick	66
2022	Tyrrell Hatton	66
2022	Tommy Fleetwood	66
2021	Shane Lowry	65
2020	Not awarded	
2019	Danny Willett	65
2018		
2017	Paul Casey	66
2017	Ross Fisher	66
2016	Rory McIlroy	67
2015	Pádraig Harrington	65
2014	Rory McIlroy	66
2013	Ian Poulter	67
2012	Paul Lawrie	65
2011	Darren Clarke	68
2011	Graeme McDowell	68
2010	Andrew Coltart	66
2009	Luke Donald	67
2008	David Howell	67
2007	Pádraig Harrington	67
2007	Paul McGinley	67
2006	Greg Owen	67
2005	Colin Montgomerie	66
2004	Lee Westwood	67
2003	Nick Faldo	67
2002	Colin Montgomerie	64
2001	Colin Montgomerie	65
2001	Des Smyth	65
2000	Darren Clarke	68
2000	Pádraig Harrington	68
2000	Dean Robertson	68
1999	Paul Lawrie	67
1998	Andrew Coltart	68
1998	Philip Walton	68
1997	Stephen Ames	66
1997	Darren Clarke	66
1997	David Tapping	66
1996	Paul Broadhurst	65
1996	Paul McGinley	65
1995	Nick Faldo	67
1994	Nick Faldo	64
1993	Nick Faldo	63
1992	Nick Faldo	64
1991	Roger Chapman	66
1991	Eamonn Darcy	66
1990	Paul Broadhurst	63
1989	Wayne Stephens	66
1988	Sandy Lyle	67
1987	Ross Drummond	66
1986	Gordon J. Brand	68
1985	Christy O'Connor Jnr	64
1984	Sam Torrance	66
1983	Denis Durnian	66
1982	Sandy Lyle	66
1981	Gordon J. Brand	65
1980	Ken Brown	68
1980	Eamonn Darcy	68
1980	Bill McColl	68
1979	Bill Longmuir	65
1978	Gary Cullen	67
1977	Tommy Horton	65
1976	Mark James	66
1975	Maurice Bembridge	67
1975	Neil Coles	67
1975	Bernard Gallacher	67
1975	David Huish	67
1974	John Garner	69
1974	John Morgan	69
1974	Peter Townsend	69
1973	Neil Coles	66
1972	Harry Bannerman	67
1972	Guy Hunt	67
1972	Tony Jacklin	67
1971	Peter Oosterhuis	66
1970	Neil Coles	65
1969	Christy O'Connor Snr	65
1968	Brian Barnes	70
1968	Gordon Cunningham	70
1967	Hugh Boyle	68
1967	Lionel Platts	68
1966	Peter Butler	65
1965	Brian Huggett	68
1964	Malcolm Gregson	67
1964	Bernard Hunt	67
1963	Tom Haliburton	68
1963	Christy O'Connor Snr	68
1962	Syd Scott	68
1961	Christy O'Connor Snr	67
1960	Bernard Hunt	66
1959	Peter Alliss	67
1958	Eric Brown	65
1957	Laurie Ayton, Jnr	67
1957	Eric Brown	67
1957	John Fallon	67
1956	Dennis Smalldon	68
1955	John Fallon	67
1954	Jack Hargreaves	67
1954	Syd Scott	67
1953	Dai Rees	70
1953	Eric Lester	70
1952	Fred Daly	67
1951	Jimmy Adams	68
1951	Charlie Ward	68
1950	Fred Daly	66
1949	Jimmy Adams	67
1949	Ken Bousfield	67
1948	Henry Cotton	66
1947	Laurie Ayton, Jnr	69
1947	Henry Cotton	69
1939	Dick Burton	70
1939	Jack Busson	70
1939	Max Faulkner	70
1938	Dick Burton	69
1938	Jack Busson	69
1937	Reg Whitcombe	70
1936	Bill Branch	68
1935	Alf Perry	67
1934	Bill Davies	68
1933	Abe Mitchell	68
1932	Arthur Havers	68
1931	Held in abeyance	
1930	Archie Compston	68
1929	Percy Alliss	69
1928	Held in abeyance	
1927	Fred Robson	69
1926	Held in abeyance	
1925	Ted Ray	73
1924	Ernest Whitcombe	70

== Tournament winners ==
This table gives details of the tournament winners from 1901 to 1923. From 1910 the cup was awarded to the winner of a qualifying competition for a major tournament.

Year	Winner	Country	Venue	Score	Margin of victory	Runner(s)-up	Winner's share (£)	Ref
1901	J.H. Taylor	England	Tooting Bec Golf Club	149	3 strokes	(Scotland) James Hepburn (England) Rowland Jones		
1902	James Braid	Scotland	Romford Golf Club	148	6 strokes	(Scotland) Ralph Smith		
1903	James Braid	Scotland	Hanger Hill Golf Club	148	3 strokes	(Jersey) Harry Vardon (Scotland) Jack White		
1904	James Braid	Scotland	West Middlesex Golf Club	147	Playoff (18 holes)	(Scotland) John McLaren		
1905	Alfred Toogood	England	Northwood Golf Club	150	1 stroke	(England) J.H. Taylor		
1906	William Lonie	Scotland	Ashford Manor Golf Club	152	4 strokes	(England) Wilfrid Reid		
1907	James Braid	Scotland	South Herts Golf Club	151	3 strokes	(England) J.H. Taylor		
1908	Rowland Jones	England	Neasden Golf Club	153	Playoff (18 holes)	(England) Ernest Gray		
1909	James Sherlock	England	Maidenhead Golf Club	149	4 strokes	(Scotland) James Braid		
1910	James Sherlock	England	Stoke Poges Golf Club	148	4 strokes	(England) Tom Ball (Jersey) Ernest Gaudin (England) Charles Mayo (Jersey) Tom Vardon		
1911	Harry Vardon	Jersey	Banstead Downs Golf Club	154	Playoff (18 holes)	(England) Wilfrid Reid		
1912	Phil Gaudin	Jersey	Royal Mid-Surrey Golf Club	147	Playoff (18 holes)	(Scotland) James Braid		
1913	Ted Ray	Jersey	Old Fold Manor Golf Club	145	Playoff (18 holes)	(England) James Batley		
1914–19: No tournament
1920	Ted Ray	Jersey	Worplesdon Golf Club	149	1 stroke	(England) Abe Mitchell	10	
1921	Arnaud Massy	France	Cooden Beach Golf Club	147	1 stroke	(England) Fred Robson (Jersey) Ted Ray	25	
1922: No tournament
1923	George Duncan	Scotland	Purley Downs Golf Club	142	2 strokes	(Jersey) Ted Ray		

In 1904 the PGA experimented with handicaps and John McLaren, a new professional, was one of six professionals to receive strokes. Vardon won the playoff, played the same evening, scoring 76 to McLaren's 81−3=78. The 1908 playoff was also played in the evening after the tournament.

The 1910 event was planned for 11 May at Banstead Downs but was cancelled because of the death of Edward VII. The cup was awarded to the winner of the southern section qualifying competition for the News of the World Match Play.

In 1911 it was to be awarded to the winner of the southern section qualifying competition for the Sphere and Tatler Foursomes Tournament. Vardon and Reid tied in the qualifying event and had a playoff two days later to determine the winner of the cup. Vardon won with a score of 76 to Reid's 78.

Because of congestion during the 1911 qualifying, the 1912 southern section qualifying competition for the Sphere and Tatler tournament was played on two courses. Half played at West Herts Golf Club and half at Purley Downs Golf Club. Phil Gaudin and James Braid led their respective events, both scoring 147, and a playoff between them would determine the winner of the cup. The playoff did not take place for nearly a year, being played on 31 March 1913 at Royal Mid-Surrey Golf Club. Gaudin scored 76 to Braid's 81.

The same system was used in 1913. Half played at Fulwell Golf Club and half at Denham Golf Club. At Fulwell, Rowland Jones and Ted Ray tied on 145 while at Denham, James Batley and Harry Vardon led on 152. A playoff between the four players would determine the winner of the cup. As in 1912, the playoff did not take place for nearly a year, being played on 14 April 1914 at Thorpe Hall Golf Club. 18 holes were played and resulted in another tie. Batley and Ray scoring 74, with Jones on 77 and Vardon on 78. There was then a further playoff on 20 April 1914 at Old Fold Manor Golf Club. Again 18 holes were played, Ray winning with a score of 74 to Batley's 76.

In 1920, 1921 and 1923 the trophy was awarded to the winner of the southern section qualifying competition for the Daily Mail Tournament.
