= 1911 Coronation Match =

Tournament information
- Location: Sandwich, England
- Established: 1911
- Course(s): Royal St George's Golf Club
- Format: Team match play
- Month played: June

Final champion
- Professionals

The 1911 Coronation Match was a men's team golf competition between teams of amateur and professional golfers. It was played at Royal St George's Golf Club on 24 June 1911, the Saturday before the 1911 Open Championship, to celebrate the coronation of George V two days earlier. The match replaced the annual England–Scotland Professional Match which had been played just before the Open Championship since 1903.

The amateur team consisted of 11 Englishmen, 5 Scotsmen, one Irishman and one American while the professional team consisted of 11 Englishmen, 5 Scotsmen, one Irishman and one Frenchman. The match resulted in an overwhelming win for the professionals by 8 matches to 1, most of the matches being quite one-sided.

== Format ==
The match was contested on a single day with nine 36-hole foursomes matches. As with the England–Scotland Professional Match, the players went off in a seeded order.

== Results ==
Jack White was initially selected but was indisposed and replaced by another Scot, James Hepburn.

Professionals	Results	Amateurs
James Braid/Arnaud Massy	6 & 5	John Ball/Chick Evans
Harry Vardon/George Duncan	5 & 4	Harold Hilton/John Graham
J.H. Taylor/Ted Ray	8 & 7	Everard Martin Smith/Robert Harris
Sandy Herd/Tom Ball	8 & 6	Reymond de Montmorency/Cecil Hutchison
James Sherlock/Fred Robson	4 & 3	Edward Lassen/Herbert Taylor
Charles Mayo/Wilfrid Reid	6 & 5	Frank Woolley/Frank Carr
Tom Williamson/Robert Thomson	10 & 9	Edward Blackwell/Angus Hambro
Rowland Jones/Michael Moran	38 holes	Harold Beveridge/Lionel Munn
James Hepburn/Thomas Renouf	8 & 7	Michael Scott/Leicester Stevens
8	Total	1
