= 1909 Open Championship =

Coordinates: 51.2395°N 1.3965°E

Tournament information
- Dates: 10–11 June 1909
- Location: Deal, Kent, England
- Course: Royal Cinque Ports Golf Club

Statistics
- Length: 6,581 yards (6,018 m)
- Field: 69 players (204 entered qualifying)
- Cut: none
- Prize fund: £115
- Winner's share: £50

Champion
- (England) J.H. Taylor
- 295

Location in England
Location in Kent. England

The 1909 Open Championship was the 49th Open Championship, held 10–11 June at Royal Cinque Ports Golf Club in Deal, Kent, England. J.H. Taylor won the Championship for the fourth time, six strokes ahead of runners-up Tom Ball and James Braid. Royal Cinque Ports had been added as the sixth course on the Open rota at a meeting in November 1907 at which meeting it was decided it would host in 1909. The meeting also agreed that the Championship was to be played in England and Scotland alternately.

Qualifying took place over 36 holes on Tuesday and Wednesday, 8–9 June. The 204 players were divided into two "sections" and those in the first played on the first morning and second afternoon, while those in the second section played on the first afternoon and second morning. The leading thirty players and ties from each section qualified, with the additional provision that each section had to contain at least thirty professionals. The second section finished their qualifying first with Tom Ball, Harold Hilton and Ted Ray leading on 150. Thirty players scored 159 or better, but this included three amateurs and so the five players on 160 also qualified. Charles Mayo led the first section on 146. Thirty players scored 160 or better, but this included three amateurs, so the four on 161 qualified. Thus a total of 69 players qualified; 63 professionals and six amateurs.

Charles Johns opened at 72 and led after the first round on Thursday morning, with J. Piper second on 73 and Taylor and Ball a stroke behind. Taylor had the best score in the afternoon and led after the first day on 147, a stroke ahead of Johns, with Ball back on 149 and Sandy Herd on 151; Piper faded badly with an 85 for 157.

On Friday morning, Taylor scored 74, only bettered by a 73 by Braid. Taylor's lead over Ball was extended to four with Braid and Johns a further two behind. In the afternoon, Taylor had another steady round of 74 for 295. After eight holes, Ball was two better than Taylor at the same point but he eventually finished six shots behind Taylor on 301, tied with Braid with Johns a further stroke behind.

Cinque Ports was scheduled to host again in 1915, but World War I intervened; it was the site of the first Open after the war, in 1920.

== Course ==
Hole	Yards	Hole	Yards
1	318	10	375
2	376	11	473
3	476	12	162
4	150	13	400
5	475	14	195
6	282	15	417
7	383	16	483
8	480	17	372
9	350	18	414
Out	3,290	In	3,291
Source:		Total	6,581

== Round summaries ==
=== First round ===
Thursday, 10 June 1909 (morning)

Place	Player	Score
1	(England) Charles Johns	72
2	(England) James Piper	73
T3	(England) Tom Ball	74
T3	(England) J.H. Taylor	74
T5	(Scotland) Cecil Hutchison (a)	75
T5	(Scotland) Robert Maxwell (a)	75
T5	(Ireland) Hugh McNeill	75
T8	(England) Albert Bellworthy	76
T8	(Jersey) Ernest Gaudin	76
T8	(Scotland) Sandy Herd	76
T8	(France) Arnaud Massy	76
T8	(Wales) Robert Myddelton (a)	76
T8	(Jersey) Thomas Renouf	76

=== Second round ===
Thursday, 10 June 1909 (afternoon)

Place	Player	Score
1	(England) J.H. Taylor	74-73=147
2	(England) Charles Johns	72-76=148
3	(England) Tom Ball	74-75=149
4	(Scotland) Sandy Herd	76-75=151
T5	(Jersey) Ernest Gaudin	76-77=153
T5	(Jersey) Ted Ray	77-76=153
T7	(Scotland) James Braid	79-75=154
T7	(England) Bernard Nicholls	78-76=154
T7	(England) Peter Rainford	78-76=154
T7	(Jersey) Thomas Renouf	76-78=154

=== Third round ===
Friday, 11 June 1909 (morning)

Place	Player	Score
1	(England) J.H. Taylor	74-73-74=221
2	(England) Tom Ball	74-75-76=225
T3	(Scotland) James Braid	79-75-73=227
T3	(England) Charles Johns	72-76-79=227
5	(Jersey) Ted Ray	77-76-76=229
T6	(Jersey) Ernest Gaudin	76-77-77=230
T6	(England) Edward Lassen (a)	82-74-74=230
T6	(England) Peter Rainford	78-76-76=230
T6	(Jersey) Thomas Renouf	76-78-76=230
T10	(Scotland) James Hepburn	78-77-76=231
T10	(Scotland) Sandy Herd	76-75-80=231
T10	(England) Bernard Nicholls	78-76-77=231

=== Final round ===
Friday, 11 June 1909 (afternoon)

Place	Player	Score	Money (£)
1	(England) J.H. Taylor	74-73-74-74=295	50
T2	(England) Tom Ball	74-75-76-76=301	20
T2	(Scotland) James Braid	79-75-73-74=301	20
4	(England) Charles Johns	72-76-79-75=302	10
5	(Jersey) Thomas Renouf	76-78-76-73=303	7; 10s
6	(Jersey) Ted Ray	77-76-76-75=304	7; 10s
7	(England) William Horne	77-78-77-74=306	0
T8	(Scotland) James Hepburn	78-77-76-76=307	0
T8	(Scotland) Sandy Herd	76-75-80-76=307	0
T10	(England) Edward Lassen (a)	82-74-74-78=308	0
T10	(England) Bernard Nicholls	78-76-77-77=308	0
T10	(England) George Pulford	81-76-76-75=308	0
