= True Temper Foursomes Tournament =

Tournament information
- Location: West Bromwich, England
- Established: 1939
- Course: Sandwell Park Golf Club
- Format: Foursomes stroke play (36 holes)
- Prize fund: £1,000
- Month played: May
- Final year: 1939

Final champion
- Dick Burton and Fred Robson
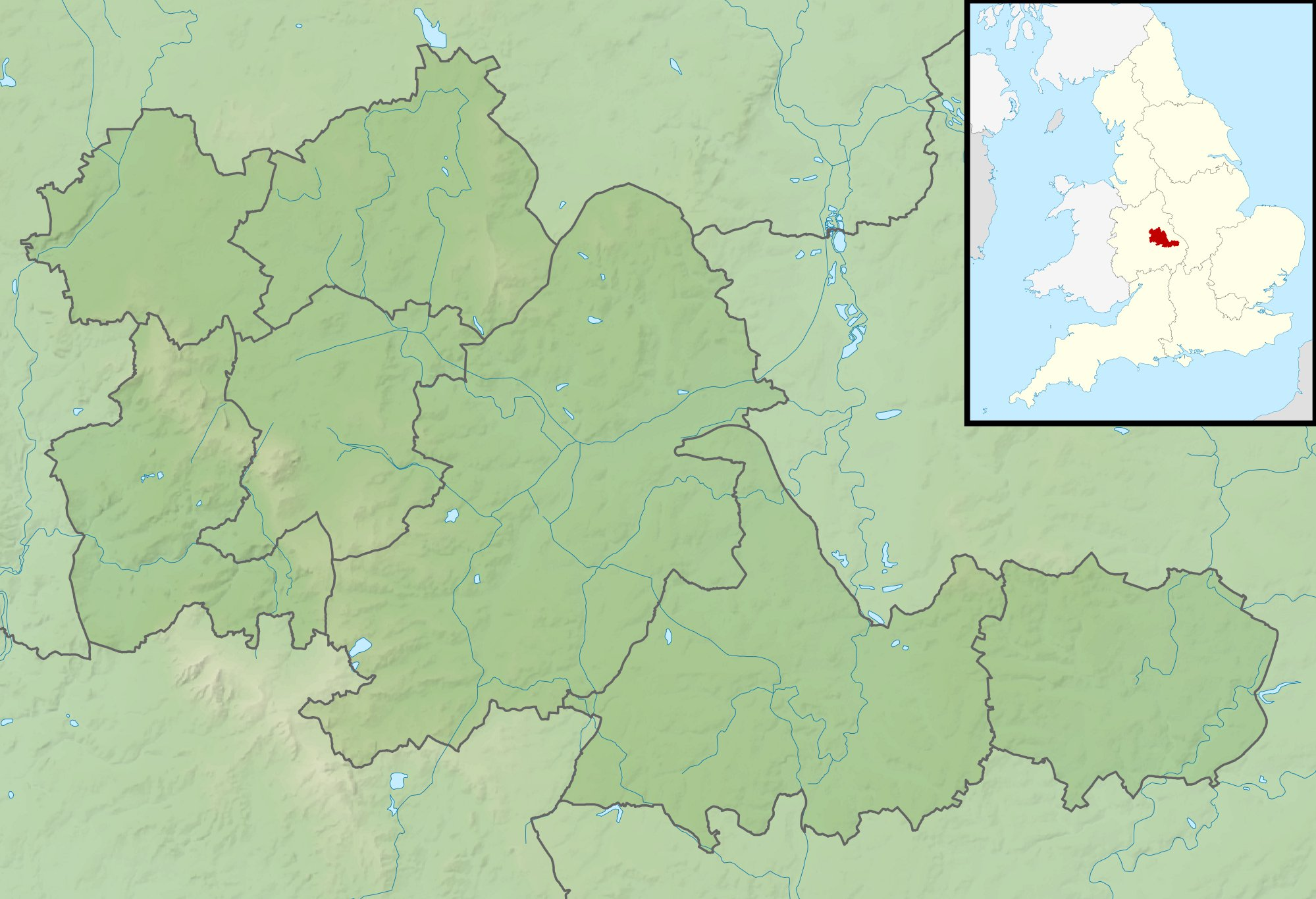
- Location in England Location in the West Midlands

The True Temper Foursomes Tournament was a professional golf tournament played in West Bromwich, England. The event was held just once, in 1939, and had total prize money of £1,000. The tournament was a 36-hole foursomes event played on 3 and 4 May. It was won by Dick Burton and Fred Robson in a three-pair 18-hole playoff on 5 May. "True Temper" was a brand of steel golf shafts.

== Detail ==
Pairs were decided by a draw. The players being divided into two groups, those under and over 32 years of age. There was some confusion because of the introduction of the fourteen-club rule on 1 May. Because the PGA had not received official notification from the R&A of the ratification of the rule change, it was decided not to enforce the new rule, although many of the players chose to only play with 14 clubs.

John Burton and Henry Busson led after the first day after a 68. Both were brothers of Ryder Cup players: Dick Burton and Jack Busson.

The contest ended in a tie with three pairs tied on 142: Dick Burton and Fred Robson, Henry Cotton and Basil Shepard, Reg Cox and Lambert Topping. The overnight leaders, Burton and Busson, faded with a 76 and finished sixth.

The playoff was played in heavy rain and only attracted a few spectators. Burton and Robson scored 71, Cotton and Shepard scored 75 while Cox and Topping scored 79. The first prize as £200, with £100 for second and £70 for third.

== Winners ==
Year	Winners	Country	Venue	Score	Margin of victory	Runners-up	Winner's share (£)	Ref
1939	Dick Burton and Fred Robson	England England	Sandwell Park Golf Club	142	Playoff (18 holes)	(England) Henry Cotton and (England) Basil Shepard (England) Reg Cox and (England) Lambert Topping	200 (pair)	
