= Edward Lassen =

English amateur golfer (1876–1938)

Personal information
- Full name: Edward Albert Lassen
- Nationality: England
- Born: 12 August 1876 Bradford, Yorkshire, England
- Died: 14 August 1938 (aged 62) Bradford, Yorkshire, England

Career
- Sport: Golf
- Status: Amateur

Best results in major championships (wins: 1)
- Masters Tournament: DNP
- PGA Championship: DNP
- U.S. Open: DNP
- The Open Championship: T10: 1909
- British Amateur: Won: 1908

Edward Albert Lassen (12 August 1876 – 14 August 1938) was an English amateur golfer. He won the Amateur Championship in 1908.

Lassen was a surprise winner of the 1908 Amateur Championship but in the period up until the start of World War I he was one of the leading amateur golfers. He was runner-up in the 1911 Amateur Championship, losing to Harold Hilton in the final. He was also Yorkshire Amateur Championship four times between 1908 and 1914. He played for England against Scotland in the annual amateur match in 1909, 1910, 1911, and 1912 and for the amateurs against the professionals in the 1911 Coronation Match.

Lassen qualified for the Open Championship five times between 1909 and 1914. In 1909 he finished tied for 10th and was the leading amateur. He also had top-20 finishes in 1913 and 1914, being the second amateur on each occasion. In 1909 he started with an 82 but two rounds of 74 lifted him to sixth place, before a final round of 78 left him in tenth place.

Lassen was a useful local chess player. He beat José Raúl Capablanca in a simultaneous exhibition in Bradford.

He was a stuff merchant by occupation, although he got into financial difficulties in the late-1920s.

== Amateur wins ==
- 1900 Yorkshire Amateur Championship
- 1908 Amateur Championship, Yorkshire Amateur Championship
- 1909 Yorkshire Amateur Championship
- 1913 Yorkshire Amateur Championship
- 1914 Yorkshire Amateur Championship

== Major championships ==
=== Wins (1) ===
Year	Championship	Winning score	Runner-up
1908	Amateur Championship	7 & 6	(England) Herbert Taylor

=== Results timeline ===
Tournament	1909	1910	1911	1912	1913	1914
The Open Championship	T10 LA	CUT	64		T14	T17

Note: Lassen only played in The Open Championship.

Top 10
Did not play

LA = low amateur
CUT = missed the half-way cut
"T" indicates a tie for a place

== Team appearances ==
- Coronation Match (representing the Amateurs): 1911
- England–Scotland Amateur Match (representing England): 1909, 1910 (winners), 1911, 1912
