= Tom Simpson (golfer) =

English professional golfer (1877–1964)

Personal information
- Full name: Thomas William Simpson
- Nationality: England
- Born: 1877 Cayton, Yorkshire, England
- Died: 1964

Career
- Sport: Golf
- Turned professional: c. 1899

Best results in major championships
- Masters Tournament: DNP
- PGA Championship: DNP
- U.S. Open: DNP
- The Open Championship: T7: 1908

Thomas William Simpson (1877–1964) was an English professional golfer. He had two top-10 finishes in The Open Championship, in 1905 and 1908.

== Early life ==
Simpson was born in Cayton, near Scarborough, Yorkshire in 1879. He learnt his golf at Ganton Golf Club where Harry Vardon was the professional. Simpson had two younger brothers, Harry and Amos, who were also professional golfers.

== Golf career ==
Simpson was at Wakefield Golf Club from about 1900 and then at Timperley Golf Club from 1902 before moving to Lytham & St Annes Golf Club in early 1905. Simpson was at Lytham until 1919 when he moved to Hesketh Golf Club where he remained until at least 1926.

Simpson first entered The Open Championship in 1900. He scored 84 and 86 on the first day to make the cut and finished in a tie for 14th place. He played again in 1901, missing the cut by 2 strokes, and in 1902 where he missed the cut by 7 strokes. In 1903 Simpson qualified for the final stages of the first News of the World Match Play, taking one of the five paces allocated to the Northern Section of the P.G.A. He met J. H. Taylor in the first round, losing 3 & 1. He qualified again the following year, losing to Alfred Toogood at the last-16 stage.

After moving to Lytham, he entered the 1905 Open Championship. He had an 88 on the second day but still made the cut. Final-day rounds of 78 and 81 lifted him into a tie for 9th place. In 1906 he finished tied for 15th in the Open Championship and he was third in the Leeds Cup. Qualifying was introduced for the 1907 Open. Simpson entered but failed to qualify. Simpson entered again in 1908 and qualified with two rounds of 81. In the Championship itself, he had rounds of 75-77-76-79 to finish in a tie for seventh place. Simpson failed to qualify for the 1909 Open Championship, but did reach the final stage of the 1909 News of the World Match Play after finishing joint runner-up in the northern section qualifying event. He lost to Charles Mayo in the first round of the final stage.

Tom Simpson, the professional golfer, is not to be confused with Tom Simpson, the leading golf architect of the 1930s.

== Results in major championships ==
Tournament	1900	1901	1902	1903	1904	1905	1906	1907	1908	1909	1910	1911	1912	1913
The Open Championship	T14	CUT	CUT			T9	T15		T7			T54		T27

Note: Simpson only played in The Open Championship.

Top 10
Did not play

CUT = missed the half-way cut
"T" indicates a tie for a place
