= Charles Johns (golfer) =

English golfer

Personal information
- Nationality: England
- Born: 1887 Devonport, Plymouth, Devon, England
- Died: 26 July 1947 (aged 60) Croydon, Surrey, England

Career
- Sport: Golf
- Status: Professional
- Professional wins: 2

Best results in major championships
- Masters Tournament: DNP
- PGA Championship: DNP
- U.S. Open: DNP
- The Open Championship: 4th: 1909

Charles Johns (1887 – 26 July 1947) was an English professional golfer.

Johns was born in Devon but the family moved to London when he was very young and then to Ashford, Middlesex, near Ashford Manor Golf Club. Johns was an assistant to Harry Cawsey at Ashford Manor before moving to Southdown Golf Club near Shoreham-by-Sea in 1907. Johns was runner-up in the 1908 Sussex Professional Tournament, losing to Jack Rowe 5&3 in the final.

Johns first came to prominence in the 1909 Open Championship. He led after the first morning with a 72 and was second at the end of the day. Despite a poor third round he finished fourth, a shot behind the runners-up. His 72 remained the lowest round of the Championship. Within weeks of the Open he became the professional at Ashford Manor, replacing Harry Cawsey who was moving to a new position in Skegness. Johns completed a good season by qualifying for the final stage of the 1909 News of the World Match Play, reaching the quarter-finals. He won £10, the same as he earned by finishing fourth in The Open. He had less success in the period until the start of World War I, although he reached the final of the Southern Professional Foursomes Tournament in 1911.

In April 1915 became the professional at Purley Downs near Croydon, replacing James Kinnell. This was perhaps a temporary appointment as he was re-appointed in April 1919, after serving during World War I. Kinnell was killed during the war. Johns remained at Purley Downs until shortly before his death.

Johns had a return to form in the 1920s. He finished in the top 20 of the Open on four occasions and also reached the semi-final of the 1922 News of the World Match Play, losing to George Gadd at the 19th hole. In 1925 he won his only important event, the Daily Mail Tournament, winning £300 and a gold medal. Johns had only qualified for the event through two playoffs. After the Southern section qualifying round he was one of 15 players scoring 79 who had a 9-hole playoff for one remaining place in the main event. Johns and James Ockenden tied with the best score and then played another 9-hole playoff the following day.

Johns had a younger brother, Jack (1891–1918), who was also a professional golfer. Jack was also at Ashford Manor and then at Southdown from 1913. He was killed in Belgium in August 1918.

== Professional wins ==
- 1925 Daily Mail Tournament
- 1929 Cuddington Professional Tournament

== Results in major championships ==
Tournament	1909	1910	1911	1912	1913	1914	1915	1916	1917	1918	1919
The Open Championship	4	WD	T43	T37		T56	NT	NT	NT	NT	NT

Tournament	1920	1921	1922	1923	1924	1925	1926	1927
The Open Championship	T16	T41	11		T16	64	T39	T17

Note: Johns only played in The Open Championship.

Top 10
Did not play

NT = No tournament
WD = withdrew
"T" indicates a tie for a place
