= James Hepburn (golfer) =

Scottish professional golfer

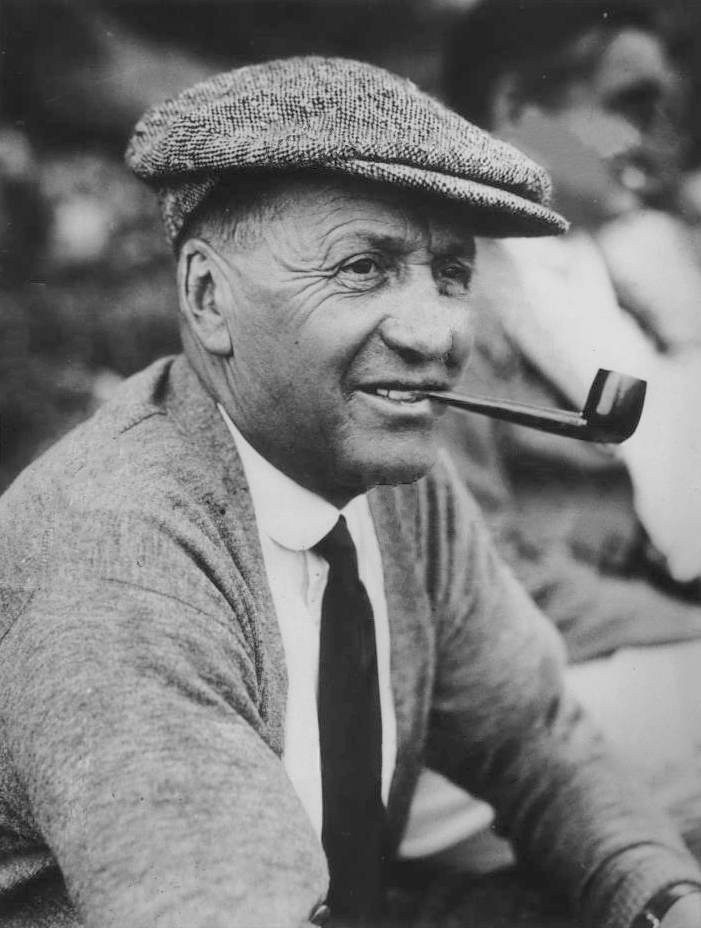
- Hepburn in 1932 in Bermuda

Personal information
- Full name: James Melville Dron Hepburn
- Nationality: Scotland
- Born: 14 September 1876 Barry, Angus, Scotland
- Died: 1945
- Spouse: Emily Preston
- Children: Daphne, Joan

Career
- Sport: Golf
- Turned professional: c. 1894

Best results in major championships
- Masters Tournament: DNP
- PGA Championship: DNP
- U.S. Open: DNF
- The Open Championship: T8: 1909

James Melville Dron Hepburn (14 September 1876 – 1945) was a professional golfer from Scotland who played in the late 19th century into the early 20th century. He once served as the secretary of the British PGA and later became one of the founding members of the PGA of America. As a player, he posted two top-10 finishes in the Open Championship, a T8 result in 1909 and a T10 finish in 1911.

== Early life ==
Hepburn was born in Barry, Angus, Scotland, on 14 September 1876, the son of James Hepburn and Margaret Gray. In 1903 he married Emily Preston at Royston, Hertfordshire, England. He had an older brother Robert Gray Hepburn (1869–1940) who was also a professional golfer. Robert was the professional at Royston Golf Club from about 1892 to 1904.

== Golf career ==
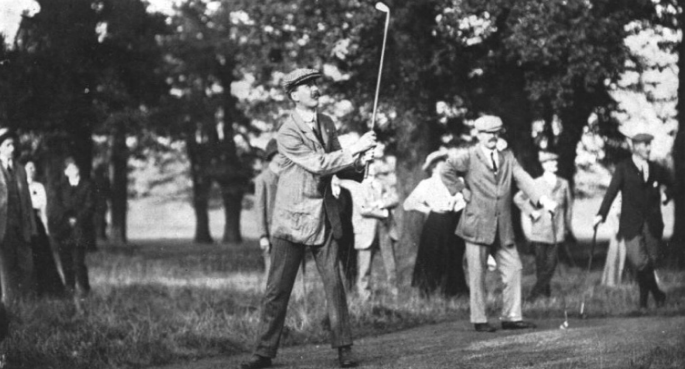
Hepburn plays an iron shot on the National Golf Links of America course in Southampton, New York, as J. H. Taylor and Harry Vardon look on. (c. 1915)

Hepburn, a club maker of some renown, was one of the founding members of the PGA of America when he served as chairman of the seven-member organizing committee. He had formerly been the secretary of the British PGA. He played in the England–Scotland Professional Match representing Scotland in 1903, 1905, 1906, 1907, 1910, 1912 and 1913. He was joint runner-up in the inaugural Tooting Bec Cup in 1901, three strokes behind the winner J. H. Taylor, and was a semi-finalist in the British PGA Matchplay Championship in 1904 and 1909. In 1904 he lost 4&2 to Alfred Toogood in the semi-final while in 1909 he lost 5&4 to the eventual winner, Tom Ball. He had two top-10 finishes in the Open Championship.

One of his first postings as a professional came at Bush Hill Park from 1896 to 1897. He later served at Enfield (London) in 1897 and Church Stretton in 1898. He was co-designer of the Church Stretton course with Jack Morris. Hepburn also spent time at Home Park (Surbiton, Surrey), from 1900 until early 1915 where he maintained a successful club-making business by partnering with Hugh Williamson, brother of the noted touring professional Tom Williamson.

In May 1915 he emigrated to the United States and became the professional at the National Golf Links in Southampton, New York, and remained there until 1928. Soon after arriving he played in the 1915 U.S. Open at Baltusrol Golf Club. He made the 36-hole cut but his name is not recorded amongst the 54-hole finishers. He taught golf lessons for several winters at Wanamaker's department store in Manhattan where he worked for Sam Wanamaker.

=== Golf course architecture ===
- Quogue Field Club, Quogue, New York (1897)
- Church Stretton Club, Church Stretton, England

== Death ==
Hepburn died of cancer in 1945. The location of his death is unknown.

== Results in major championships ==
Tournament	1897	1898	1899
The Open Championship	T49	WD	WD
U.S. Open			

Tournament	1900	1901	1902	1903	1904	1905	1906	1907	1908	1909
The Open Championship	T33	CUT	CUT	T25	T30	T24	T30	T35	T24	T8
U.S. Open										

Tournament	1910	1911	1912	1913	1914	1915
The Open Championship	T19	T10	WD		T56	NT
U.S. Open						WD

Note: Hepburn only played in The Open Championship and the U.S. Open.

Top 10
Did not play

NT = No tournament
WD = withdrew
CUT = missed the half-way cut
"T" indicates a tie for a place

== Team appearances ==
- England–Scotland Professional Match (representing Scotland): 1903 (winners), 1905 (tie), 1906, 1907, 1910, 1912 (tie), 1913
- Coronation Match (representing the Professionals): 1911 (winners)
