= Ted Ray (golfer) =

English professional golfer (1877–1943)

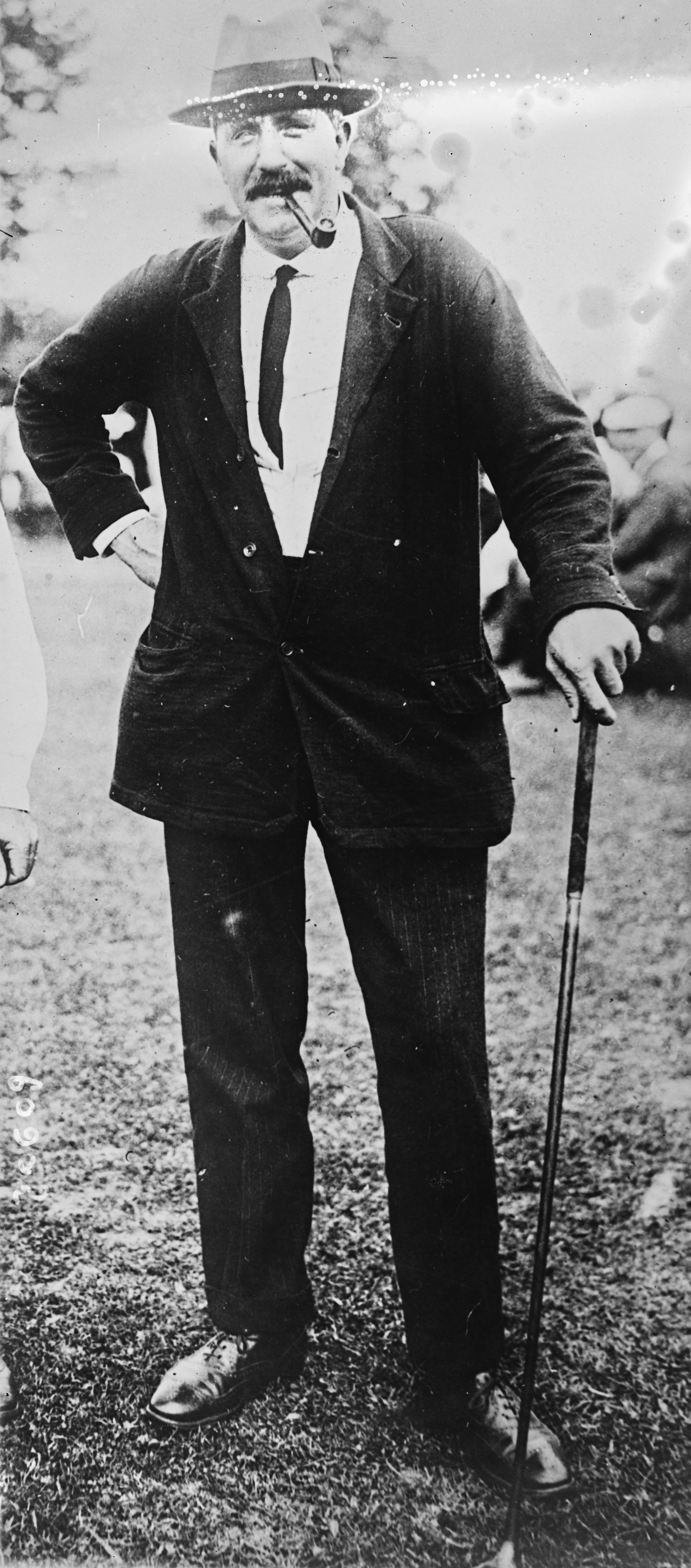
- Ray in 1920

Personal information
- Full name: Edward Rivers J. Ray
- Nickname: Ted
- Nationality: Jersey
- Born: 6 April 1877 Jersey
- Died: 26 August 1943 (aged 66) Watford, England
- Height: 6 ft 0 in (1.83 m)
- Weight: 220 lb (100 kg; 16 st)

Career
- Sport: Golf
- Turned professional: c. 1895
- Professional wins: 46

Number of wins by tour
- PGA Tour: 1
- Other: 45

Best results in major championships (wins: 2)
- Masters Tournament: DNP
- PGA Championship: DNP
- U.S. Open: Won: 1920
- The Open Championship: Won: 1912

Edward Rivers John Ray (6 April 1877 – 26 August 1943) was a British professional golfer, one of the leading players of the first quarter of the 20th century. He won two major championships, the Open Championship in 1912 and the U.S. Open in 1920, and contended in many others. He was captain of the British team in the inaugural Ryder Cup, in 1927.

== Early life ==
Ray was born at Marais, Grouville, Jersey on 6 April 1877, the son of Stephen Ray, the captain of an oyster trawler, and his wife, Mary Ann Arm. He learnt his golf on the Grouville Links, one of a large number of local boys who later became professional golfers which included Harry Vardon, his brother Tom, the Gaudin brothers, the Boomer brothers and the Renouf brothers. Ray was a tall, well-built man who was known for his prodigious power, although his shots often landed in awful positions. In addition to his prowess on the golf course, he was also useful at billiards and lawn bowls.

== Golf career ==
Ray turned professional in 1894 at the age of 17, initially working as a club-maker before becoming a professional near Saint-Malo. He played in the 1899 Open Championship finished in a tie for 16th place. Later in 1899 he took a position as a club professional at Churston Golf Club, Churston, Devon. During his time at Churston, he was encouraged by the club's committee to enter The Open Championships from 1900 to 1902, and was granted a week's leave of absence and five pounds for expenses each year. After leaving Churston in early 1903, he became the head professional at Ganton Golf Club, replacing Harry Vardon, who had left to join the South Herts Golf Club. In 1912, he took the position of golf professional at Oxhey Golf Club near Watford in Hertfordshire.

Ray favoured an attacking style, and had to develop phenomenal recovery skills. Cartoonists usually depicted him with a niblick in hand, festooned with clumps of heather and saplings, with an inseparable pipe clamped between his teeth. Ray was admired by fans for his daring play, friendly, genial manner and optimistic spirit.

Ray was also a fine clubmaker and advertised his business while the professional at Oxhey. He specialised in the production of drivers, mashies, and niblicks.

Before World War I Ray was often overshadowed by the Great Triumvirate of James Braid, J.H. Taylor and Harry Vardon and then after the war by George Duncan and Abe Mitchell. Despite this, he was one of the leading British golfers of the first quarter of the 20th century.

=== Major championships ===
Ray had an excellent record in the Open Championship. He won the Open at Muirfield in 1912, leading after every round and finishing four strokes ahead of Harry Vardon and eight clear of James Braid in third place. He was runner-up twice, in 1913 and 1925, and had 9 other finishes in the top-10. His last top-10 finish was in 1925 when, at the age of 48, he finished joint runner-up, a stroke behind Jim Barnes. Ray had the best final round of 73, despite four-putting the ninth green.

Ray played in 29 successive Open Championships from 1899 and 1932, his run ending when he failed to qualify in 1933. Ray's last appearance was in 1937, just after his 60th birthday. He had rounds of 76 and 81 to just make the qualifying score. In the championship itself, he had rounds of 87 and 88 and missed the cut by 22 strokes.

In addition to his appearances in the Open Championship, Ray also played three times in the U.S. Open, in 1913 and 1920, when he was touring America with Harry Vardon, and in 1927, when he was in America as part of the British Ryder Cup team.

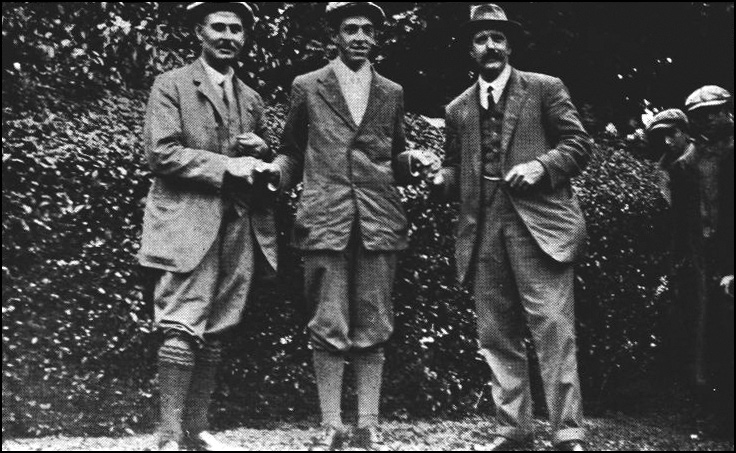
Ray (right) with Harry Vardon (left) and Francis Ouimet at the 1913 U.S. Open

Ray is best known for being in a playoff for the U.S. Open in 1913 with Harry Vardon and Francis Ouimet, the winner. Ray had an opening round of 79, but he rebounded with a course record of 70 in round two, which electrified the gallery and got him back into contention. He narrowly missed a 5-foot putt at the last that would have given him a 69. His four cards for the tournament were 79-70-76-79=304. Ray, Vardon and Ouimet played an 18-hole playoff the following day. All three took 38 for the first 9 holes, but Ouimet came home in 34 to Vardon's 39 and Ray's 40 to win the title. Already two strokes behind Ouimet, Ray effectively dropped out of contention when he took 6 at the 15th. Vardon was only one behind Ouimet after 16 holes but finished 5–6 while Ouimet finished 3–4 to win by five shots.

The 1913 U.S. Open was the subject of a 2005 Disney movie entitled, The Greatest Game Ever Played, based on author Mark Frost's 2002 book of the same name. Ray had joined Vardon on an extensive tour of North America, promoted and financed by English media baron Lord Northcliffe. The two stars travelled the continent for two months, partnering in exhibition matches against the top players in each area they visited. The tour was very successful, attracting large crowds who came out to watch the top British players challenge emerging local golf talent at a time when golf was entering a boom period of popularity, which was further stimulated by the tour. Vardon and Ray ended their tour at the 1913 U.S. Open.

Ray won the U.S. Open at Inverness in 1920, his second appearances in the championship. That victory, at 43 years, 129 days, made Ray the oldest U.S. Open champion, a record he held until Raymond Floyd, a few months older, won in 1986.

=== Tournament career ===
In addition to his wins in the 1912 Open Championship and the 1920 U.S. Open, Ray won a large number of other tournaments, although he had few wins in multi-day events. Most of his victories were in one-day 36-hole stroke-play events at which Ray excelled. Ray was also known for performing well in qualifying for the big tournaments; qualifying also generally being the one-day 36-hole stroke-play format.

Apart from his Open Championship success, Ray only won one important stroke-play tournament, the 1923 Daily Mail Tournament. Ray scored 288 to win by a stroke from Len Holland and Abe Mitchell and two from George Duncan, taking the first prize of £300. Ray had been runner-up the previous year, finishing four shots behind Duncan.

During Ray's playing career, the most important British professional tournament was the News of the World Match Play, which had started in 1903. Ray reached the final in the first season, meeting James Braid in the 36-hole final. Braid led by 1 hole after the first round. In the afternoon Braid won 3 of the first 5 holes to go 4 up and, although Ray won the next two, Braid eventually won 4&3. Ray had another good run in 1907 until he met Braid in the semi-final and lost again by the same score. In 1911 Ray beat Harry Vardon in the semi-final to reach his second final, meeting Braid again. Braid was 1 up after the morning round and, winning five holes in a row from the 3rd, was 6 up with 9 holes to play. Ray then won five of the next eight holes to take the match to the final hole. They halved this in 4 to give Braid the win by 1 hole. Ray reached the final again the following year, 1912, meeting Harry Vardon. This was Vardon's only appearance in the News of the World final. Vardon was 3 up after the morning round, but Ray had levelled the match with five holes to play. Vardon won the next two holes and, although Ray won the 17th, a half in 4 at the last left Vardon the winner by 1 hole. Ray reached his fifth semi-final in 1921, played at his home club, Oxhey, where he met his Jersey contemporary Jack Gaudin. Ray got off to a bad start and was 6 down after 10 hole and, although he made something of a recovery, he eventually lost 3&2.

From 1920 to 1927, there was a second big match-play event, the Glasgow Herald Tournament. Ray reached two finals, in 1922 and 1927. In 1922 he met Abe Mitchell in the final. Ray led by three after 11 holes of the morning round, but Mitchell finished well to level the match at lunch. Mitchell took a three-hole lead after the first nine holes of the afternoon round and eventually won 2&1, his second successive win in the tournament. In 1927, Ray met Charles Whitcombe in the final. The match was very one-sided, with Whitcombe 5-up at lunch. After 8 holes of the afternoon round, Whitcombe was dormie-10. Ray won the 9th but Whitcombe won the 10th to win 10&8.

Although Ray failed to win either the News of the World Match Play or the Glasgow Herald Tournament, he did win two match-play tournaments, the Cruden Bay Professional Tournament in 1911 and the Roehampton Invitation Tournament in 1924. These both had the same format, with a 36-hole stroke-play qualification day, after which the leading 16 played four rounds of match-play on the next two days. 1911 Cruden Bay Tournament attracted an exceptionally strong field of 44 which, as well as James Braid, J.H. Taylor and Harry Vardon, included ex-Open champions Arnaud Massy, Sandy Herd and Jack White, future Open champions George Duncan and Ray and most of the leading England-based professionals. Red led the qualifying by four strokes with rounds of 74 and 73, the 73 being a new course record. Ray met Braid in the final, Braid having beaten both Taylor and Vardon in the previous two rounds. Braid holed a 12-yard putt at the last to halve the match, and they were still level after a further 9-hole playoff. The match then became sudden-death and, with Braid going out-of-bounds, Ray won the match at the 28th hole.

The 1924 Roehampton Invitation Tournament was played in early April. Ray qualified comfortably in a tie for third place. The first day of the knock-out stage was abandoned because of snow and, although conditions were little better on the following day, the two rounds were completed. The final day was again cold and wet, with the players drinking cups of hot coffee at the turn. Ray beat George Duncan 4&3 in the semi-final and then 53-year-old Rowland Jones by 1 hole in the final.

Before World War I Ray, like many of the other leading British professionals, was a regular competitor in the main continental open championships, of which the most important was the French Open. Ray's best finish in the French Open was in 1911 when he was runner-up, 7 strokes behind Arnaud Massy. In 1912 Ray twice came close to winning on the continent. In July, soon after his Open Championship success, he played in the Belgian Open, then a one-day 36-hole event. Ray tied with Tom Ball and George Duncan on 144. Despite having already played 36 holes, the three then played an 18-hole playoff in the evening. Duncan won with a 70 with Ray runner-up after a 71 and Ball taking 78. The following month he played in the self-styled Open Championship of Germany at Baden-Baden which offered prize money of £500, four times that of the Open Championship. The prize money attracted most of the leading British professionals. Ray lost two balls in his first round of 75, taking 7 on both holes, 10 behind the leader, Charles Mayo. Ray took 66 in the afternoon but trailed J.H. Taylor by 8 strokes at the end of the first day. Scoring was generally higher on the second day but Ray had rounds of 68 and 70 to finish level with Taylor. A nine-hole playoff was arranged in the evening. Taylor started 2–3–2 and won with an incredible score of 28 to Ray's 34, Ray taking the second prize of £80.

=== International representation ===
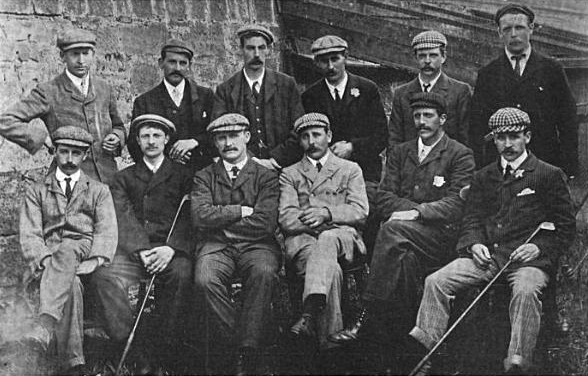
A group photo of the 1903 English golf team prior to their international match against Scotland. Ray is seated front row, second from the right.

Ray was an automatic choice for all the main internationals during his career. Before World War I, the England–Scotland Professional Match was the most important professional team competition. Ray was selected for the England team in all these matches, which started in 1903, as well as the 1911 Coronation Match. During this period, the players were seeded, so that the best players played each other, while those regarded as the weakest players also played together. In most years from 1903 to 1909, Ray was seeded 4th in the England team, behind Harry Vardon, J. H. Taylor and Tom Vardon, although he played to 5th in 1905 behind Alfred Toogood and 3rd in 1906 ahead of Tom Vardon. Ray played 3rd in 1910 and 1912 and 2nd in 1913 ahead of J. H. Taylor.

The England–Scotland Professional Match was not played immediately after the war, and in fact did not resume until 1932. Ted Ray was the non-playing Captain of the England team in 1933. The first important post-war international was a match between British and American teams in 1921 at Gleneagles. Ray played 3rd in the singles, behind George Duncan and Abe Mitchell. Ray was chosen as the British playing-captain for the 1926 international match on the East Course at the Wentworth Club in Surrey. The following year, despite having passed his 50th birthday, Ray was selected for the inaugural Ryder Cup match at Worcester Country Club in Massachusetts. Abe Mitchell was originally chosen as captain but was unable to travel because of illness, and was replaced by Ray.

== Death and legacy ==
Ray died on 26 August 1943 in the Peace Memorial Hospital, Watford, England. He had retired from his post as professional at Oxhey Golf Club on 1 May 1940 because of ill-health. He is remembered as one of the United Kingdoms's all-time greatest golfers.

== Media depiction ==
- Ray was portrayed by English actor Stephen Marcus in director Bill Paxton's 2005 film The Greatest Game Ever Played.
- In March 2018, Bill Williams authored a book entitled Ted Ray – The Forgotten Man of Golf and is about Ted Ray's life, career, and his three trips to North America in 1913, 1920, as well as 1927, when he captained Great Britain's first Ryder Cup team.

== Tournament wins (46) ==
=== PGA Tour wins (1) ===
- 1920 **U.S. Open**

=== Singles professional wins (15) ===
- 1903 Leeds Cup
- 1907 Leeds Cup
- 1910 Leeds Cup, Bramshot Cup
- 1911 Leeds Cup, Cruden Bay Professional Tournament
- 1912 Cramond Brig Tournament, **The Open Championship**
- 1913 Tooting Bec Cup
- 1919 Leeds Cup
- 1920 Tooting Bec Cup
- 1923 Daily Mail Tournament
- 1924 Roehampton Invitation Tournament
- 1925 West Kent Invitation Tournament
- 1927 Frinton Invitation Tournament

Major championships are shown in bold.

=== Other singles professional wins (25) ===
- 1899 Hampshire, Isle of Weight & Channel Islands Championship
- 1903 News of the World Northern Section qualifying at Huddersfield
- 1906 News of the World Northern Section qualifying at Ganton
- 1907 Hyeres Professional Tournament (France)
- 1909 Open Championship Qualifying, News of the World Northern Section qualifying at Blackpool
- 1910 News of the World Northern Section qualifying at Bradford
- 1911 Le Touquet Tournament (France)
- 1912 News of the World Southern Section qualifying at Sundridge Park
- 1914 Open Championship Qualifying
- 1919 News of the World Southern Section qualifying at Sonning-on-Thames
- 1921 Hertfordshire Open Championship, News of the World Southern Section qualifying at Porters Park
- 1922 Hertfordshire Open Championship, Daily Mail Southern Section qualifying at Sudbury
- 1923 Hertfordshire Open Championship
- 1924 Hertfordshire Open Championship
- 1926 PGA Southern Section (18 holes)
- 1928 Hertfordshire Open Championship
- 1930 Short Course Championship (Torquay), Daily Dispatch Qualifying, Hertfordshire Open Championship
- 1931 Hertfordshire Open Championship
- 1933 Hertfordshire Open Championship
- 1935 Hertfordshire Open Championship

=== Foursomes (5) ===
- 1908 Yorkshire Professional Foursomes Cup (with A. Hayles)
- 1909 Yorkshire Professional Foursomes Cup (with H. Mann)
- 1910 Yorkshire Professional Foursomes Cup (with T. Tate)
- 1911 Yorkshire Professional Foursomes Cup (with T. Tate)
- 1925 Bystander Cup £500 Tournament (with Miss Stocker)

== Major championships ==
=== Wins (2) ===
Year	Championship	54 holes	Winning score	Margin	Runner(s)-up
1912	The Open Championship	5 shot lead	71-73-76-75=295	4 strokes	(Jersey) Harry Vardon
1920	U.S. Open	2 shot deficit	+7 (74-73-73-75=295)	1 stroke	(United States) Jack Burke Sr., (United States) Leo Diegel, (Scotland) (United States) Jock Hutchison, (Jersey) Harry Vardon

=== Results timeline ===
Tournament	1899	1900	1901	1902	1903	1904	1905	1906	1907	1908	1909
U.S. Open											
The Open Championship	T16	13	T12	9	24	T12	T11	T8	T5	3	6

Tournament	1910	1911	1912	1913	1914	1915	1916	1917	1918	1919
U.S. Open				3				NT	NT	
The Open Championship	T5	T5	1	2	T10	NT	NT	NT	NT	NT

Tournament	1920	1921	1922	1923	1924	1925	1926	1927	1928	1929
U.S. Open	1							T27		
The Open Championship	3	T19	T46	T12	T32	T2	T30	T30	T33	T39

Tournament	1930	1931	1932	1933	1934	1935	1936	1937
U.S. Open								
The Open Championship	T24	CUT	T56					CUT

Note: Ray only played in The Open Championship and the U.S. Open.

Win
Top 10
Did not play

NT = no tournament
CUT = missed the half-way cut
"T" indicates a tie for a place

== Team appearances ==
- England–Scotland Professional Match (representing England): 1903, 1904 (tie), 1905 (tie), 1906 (winners), 1907 (winners), 1909 (winners), 1910 (winners), 1912 (tie), 1913 (winners)
- Coronation Match (representing the Professionals): 1911 (winners)
- Great Britain vs USA (representing Great Britain): 1921 (winners), 1926 (winners, captain)
- Ryder Cup (representing Great Britain): 1927 (captain)
- Seniors vs Juniors (representing the Seniors): 1928 (winners)

== Bibliography ==
- Inland Golf (1913) (as Edward Ray)
- Golf Clubs and How to Use Them (1922) (as Edward Ray)

== Gallery ==
Ted Ray, clubmaker

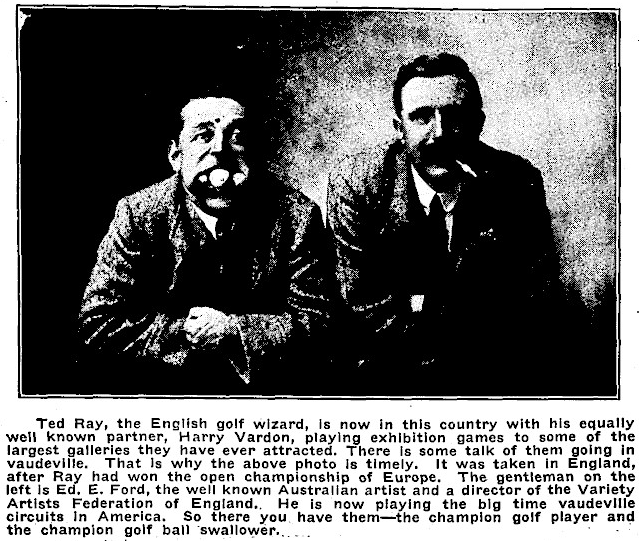
Ted Ray (right) in Vaudeville News, 1920

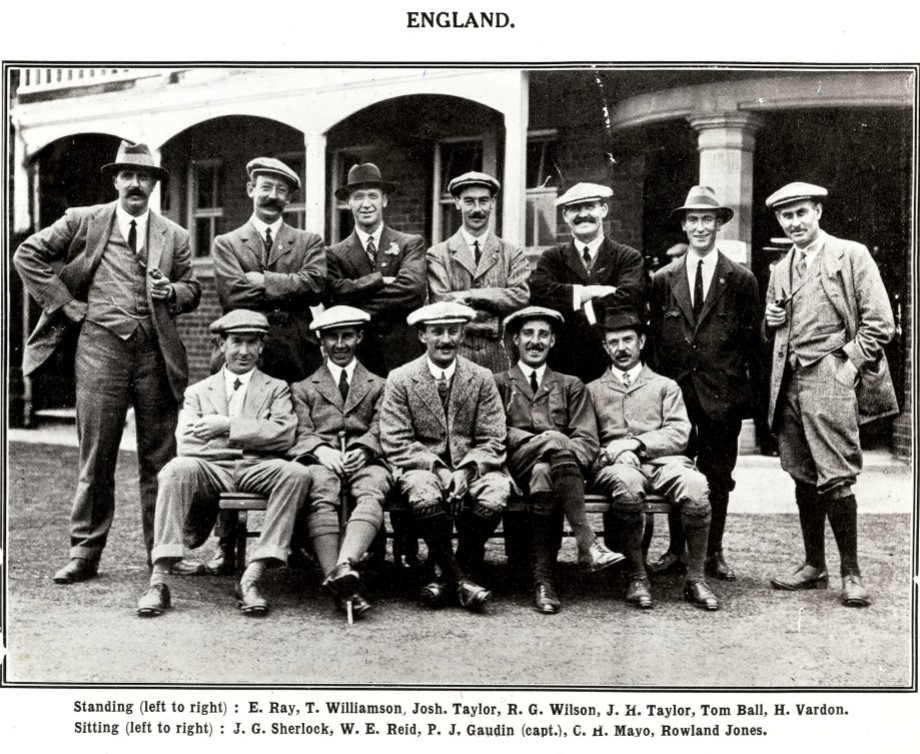
England Team 1913 - Ted Ray back left

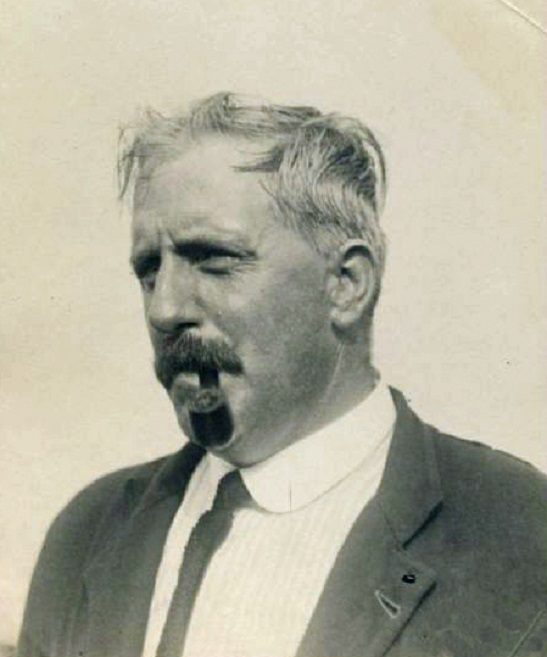
Ted Ray with familiar pipe

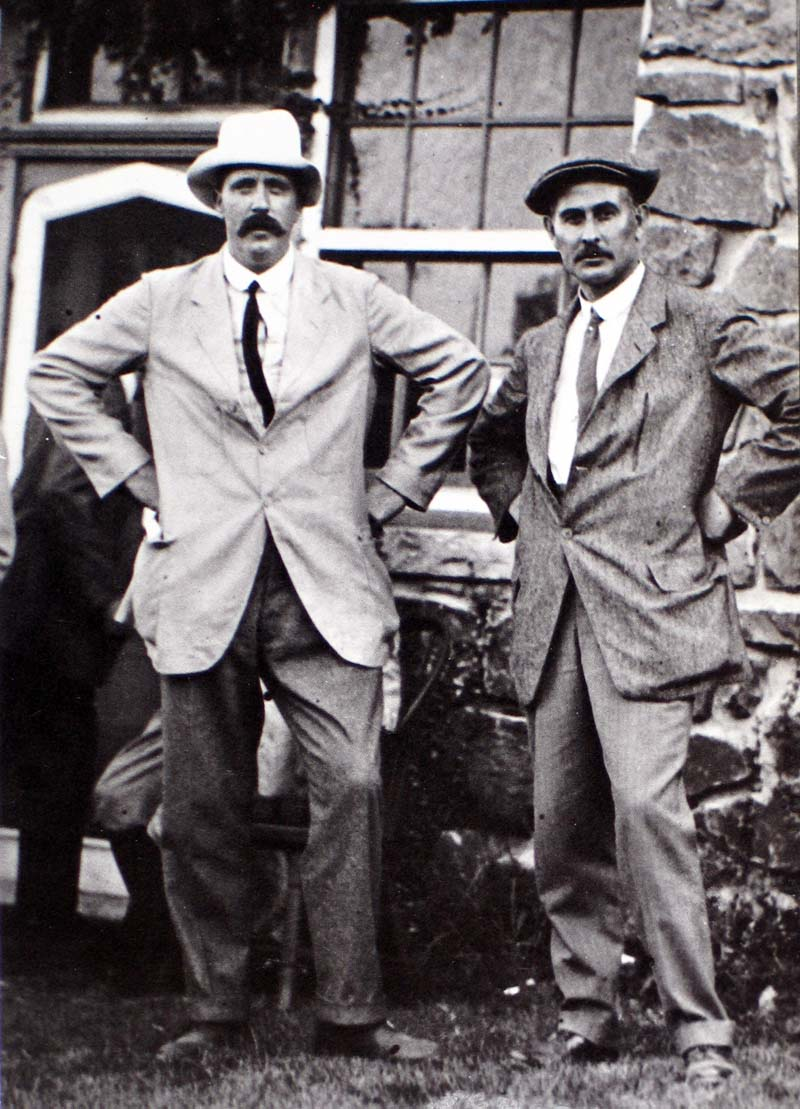
Ted Ray & Harry Vardon

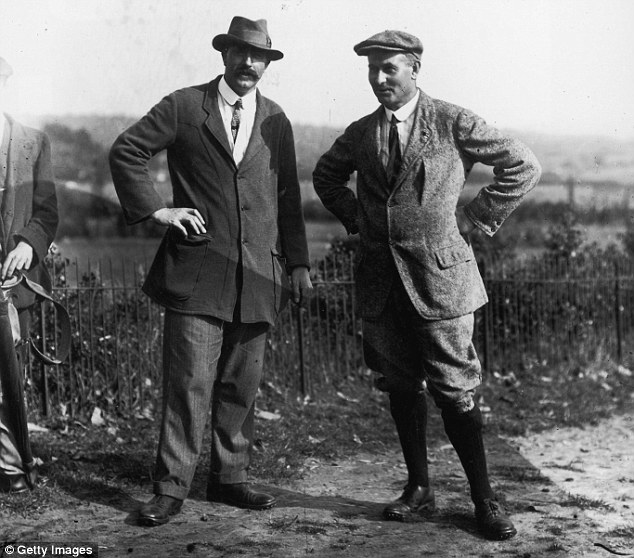
Ted Ray & Harry Vardon 1920

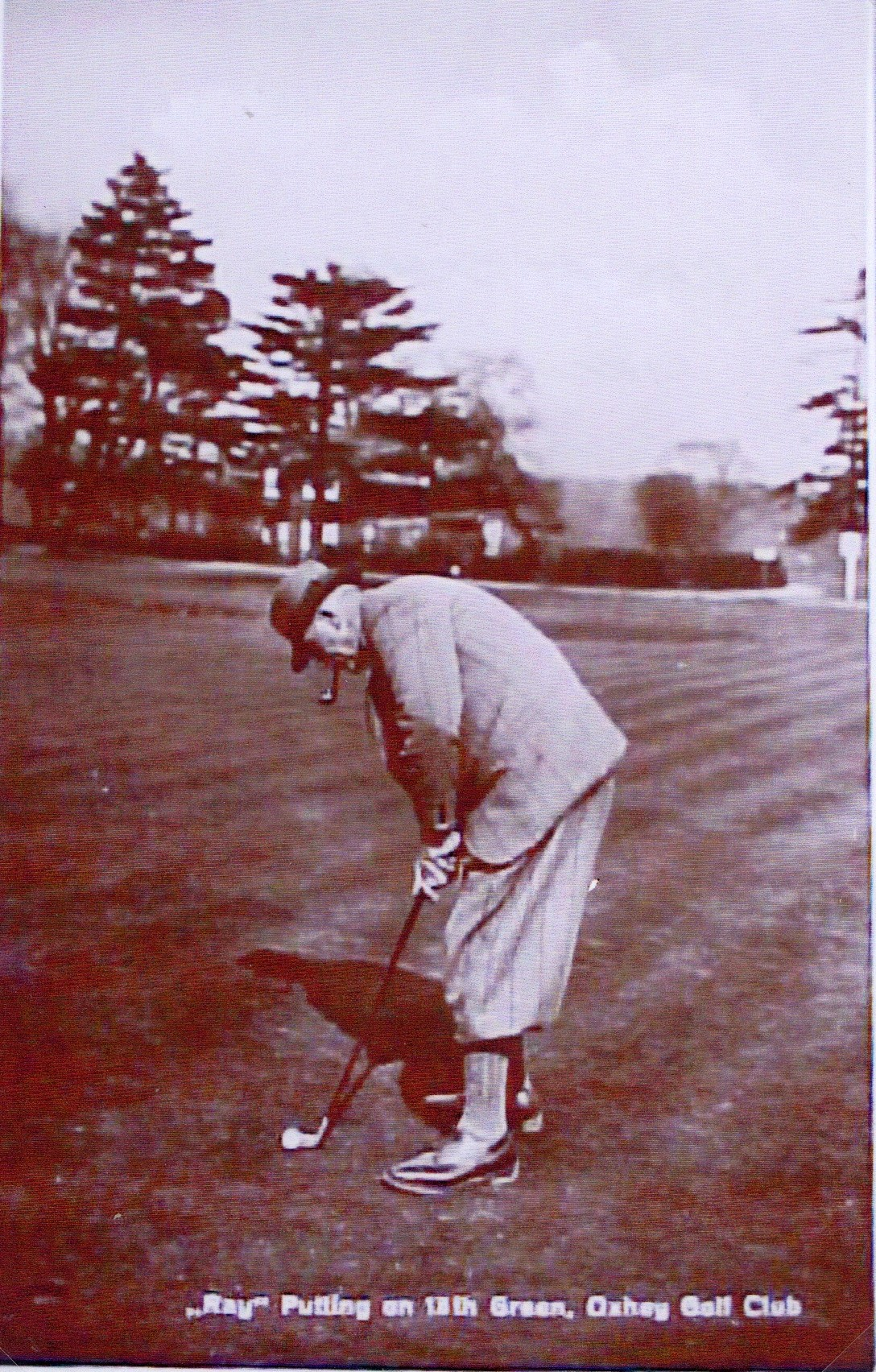
Ted Ray at Oxhey

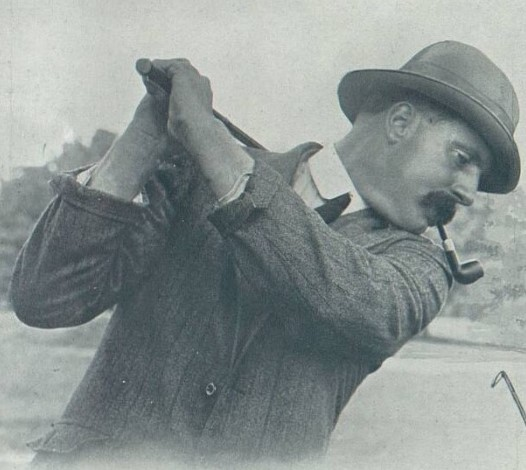
Ted in full swing

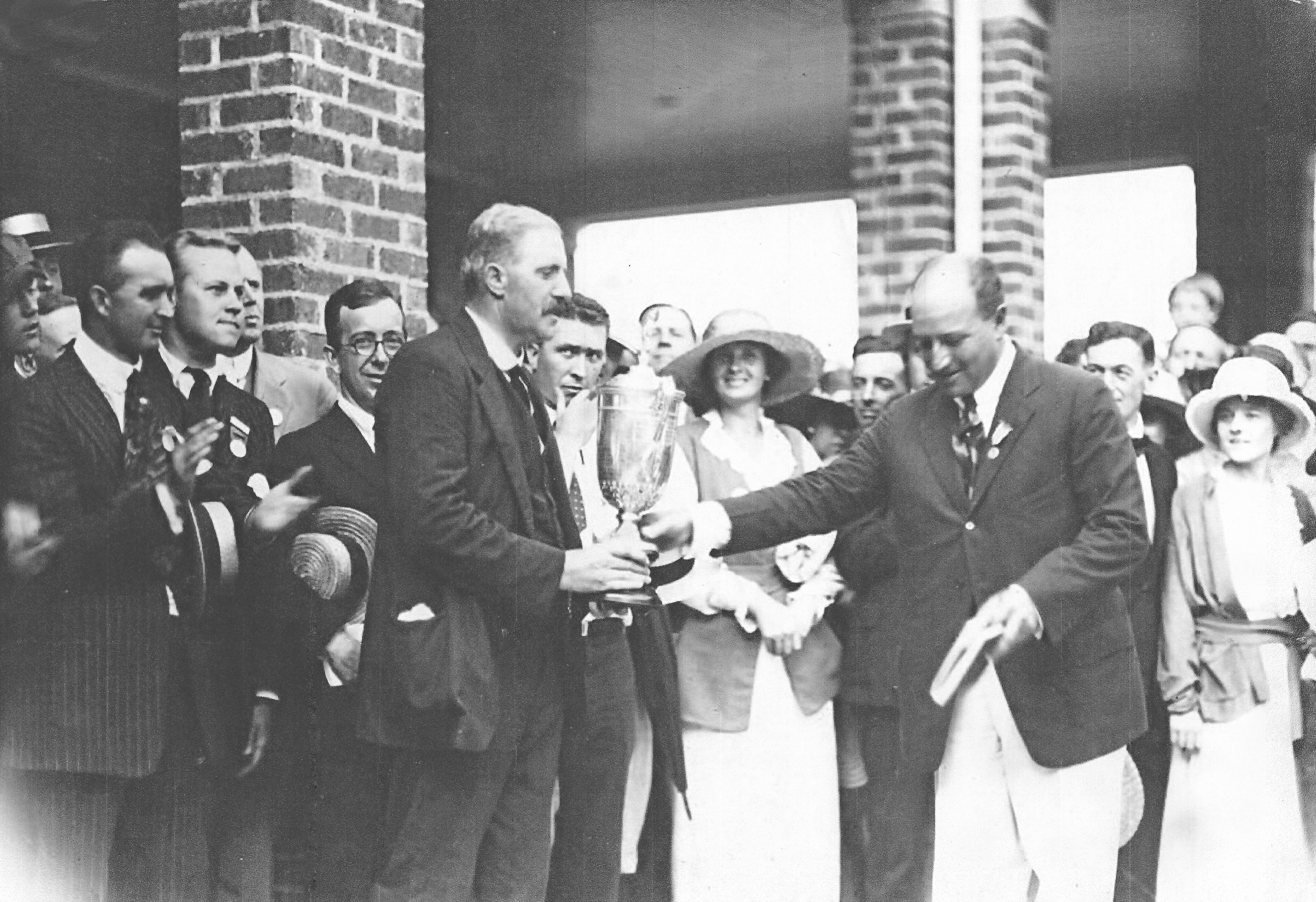
Ted Ray receives the US Open trophy 1920

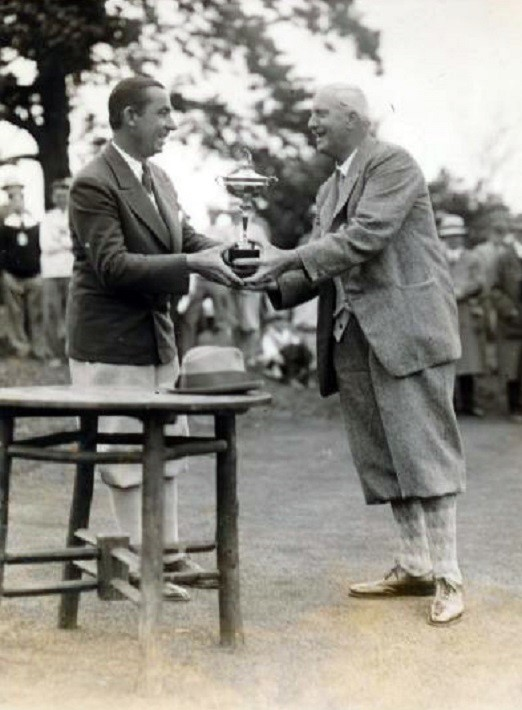
Ted presents Walter Hagen with Ryder Cup 1927

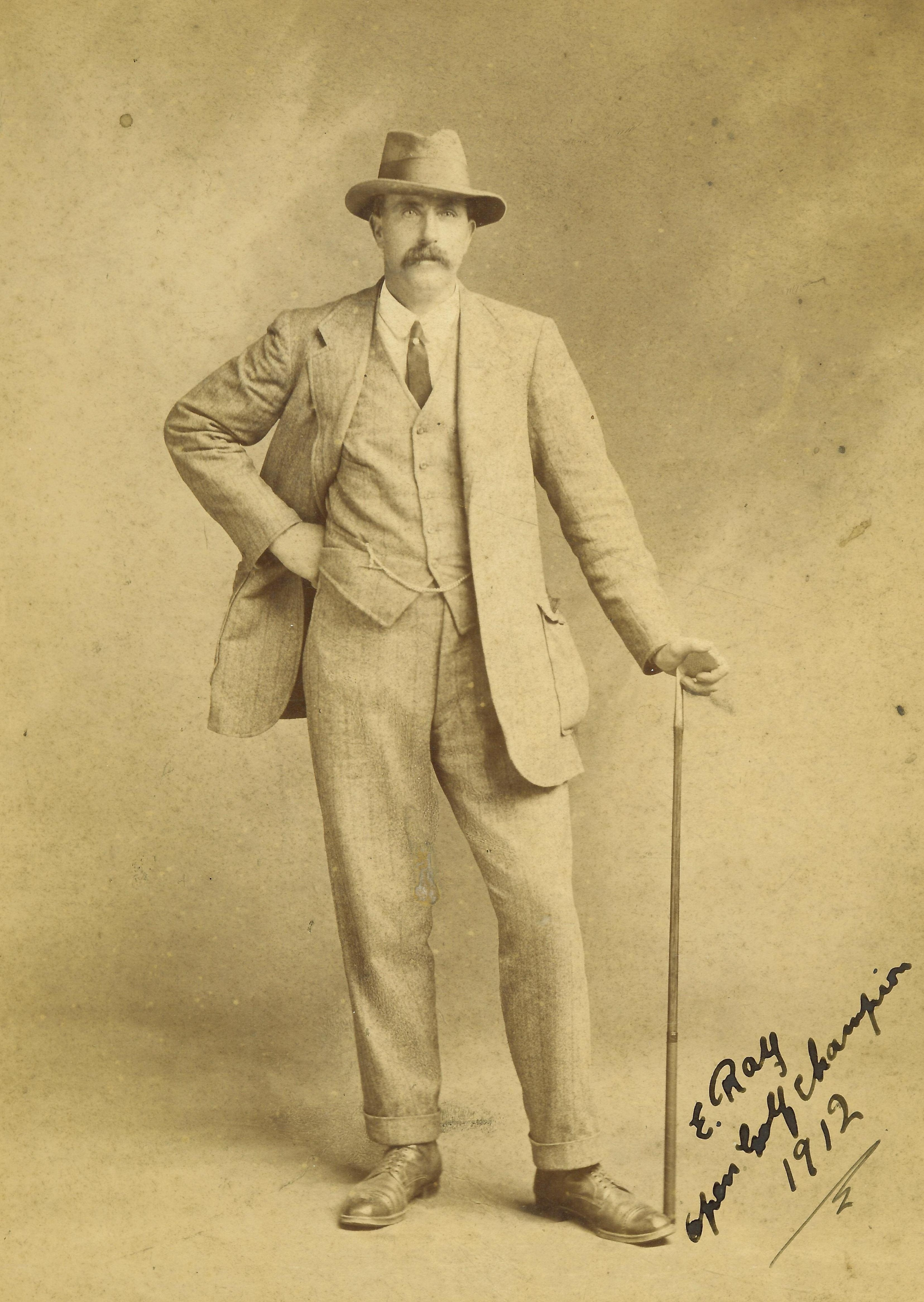
Open Champion 1912

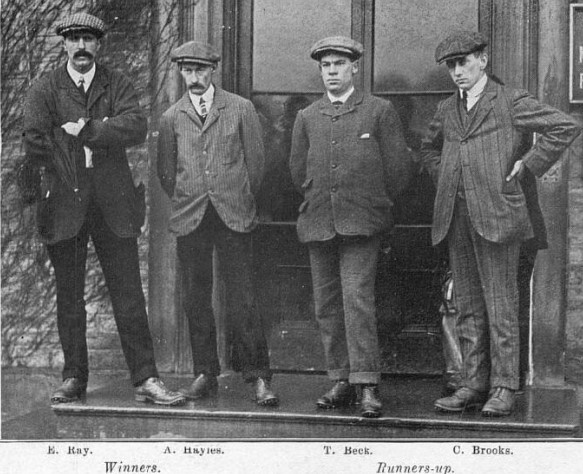
Yorkshire Professional Foursome

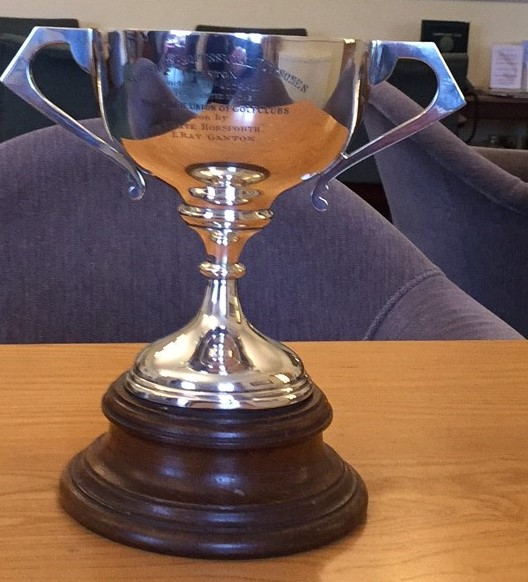
Yorkshire Professional Foursomes Cup

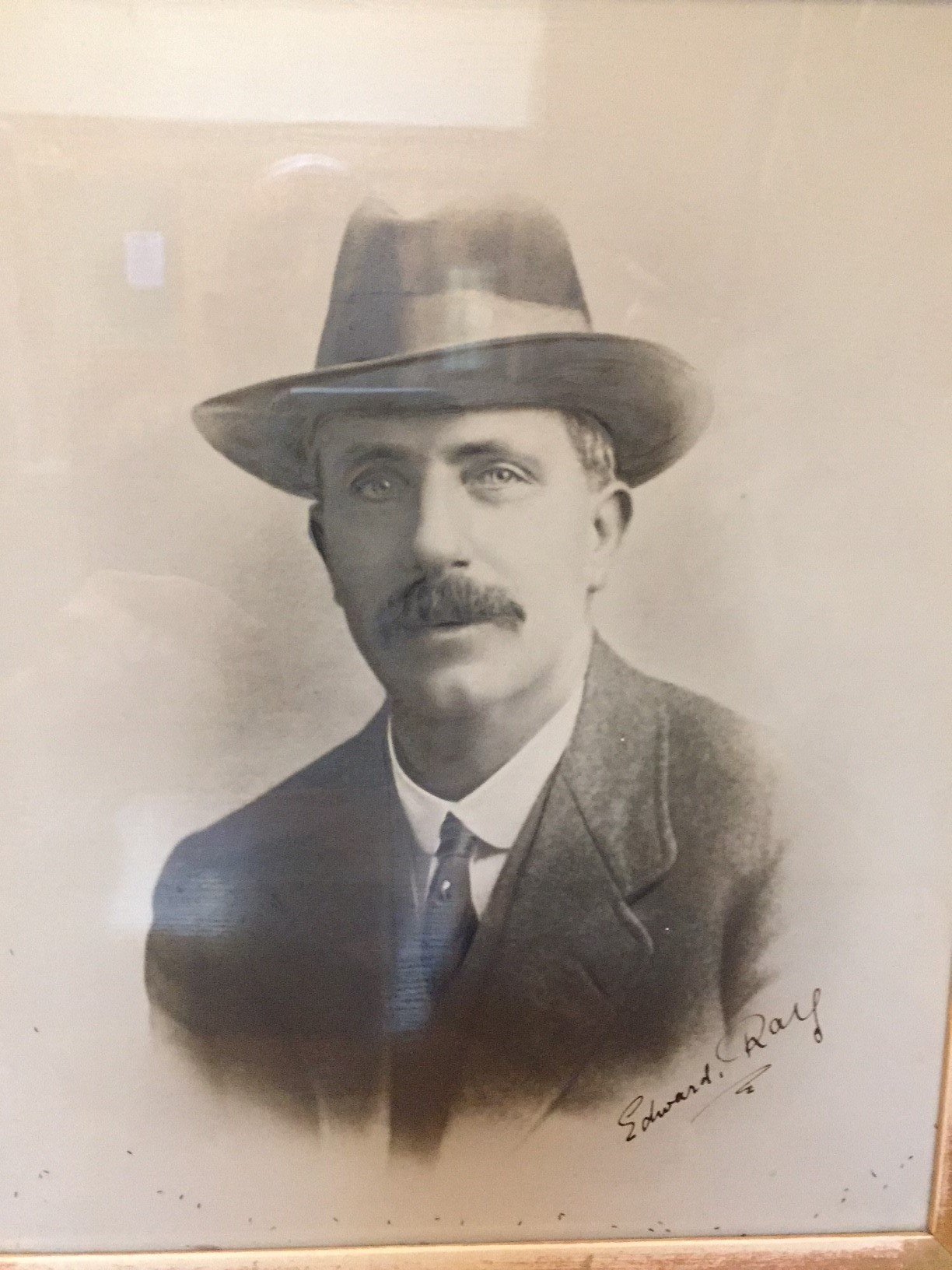
Ted Ray at Ganton G.C.

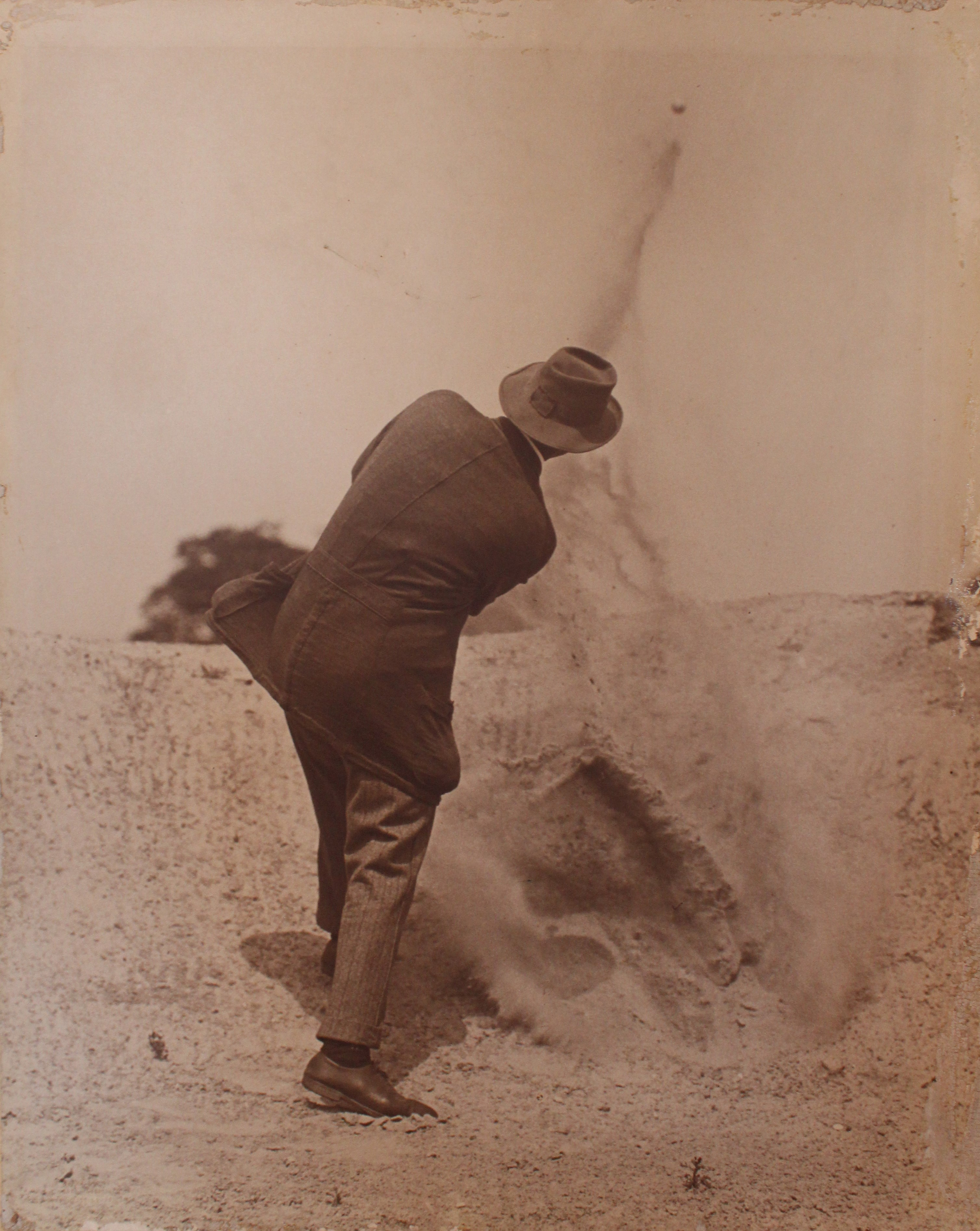
Ted Ray 1913
