= Alfred Toogood =

English professional golfer (1872–1928)

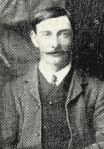
- Toogood in 1907

Personal information
- Full name: Alfred Henry Toogood
- Nationality: England
- Born: 1872 St Helens, Isle of Wight
- Died: July 1928 (aged 56) South Norwood, London, England

Career
- Sport: Golf
- Turned professional: c. 1889
- Professional wins: 2

Best results in major championships
- Masters Tournament: DNP
- PGA Championship: DNP
- U.S. Open: DNP
- The Open Championship: 4th: 1894

Alfred Henry Toogood, Sr. (1872 – July 1928) was an English professional golfer who played during the late 19th and early 20th century. Toogood finished fourth in the 1894 Open Championship and won £7. He also tied for ninth place in the 1895 Open Championship.

== Early life ==
Toogood lived at Eddington Road in the village of St Helens, located on the eastern side of the Isle of Wight. He was a frequent player at the Royal Links Club there. When he began to start a family he found it difficult to come up with enough money to play tournaments. He turned pro at the newly opened Eltham Warren Golf Club in London. He then worked at the Minchinhampton Golf Club in the Cotswolds (1895–1900), in Headingley at Leeds Golf Club (1900–1902), West Essex Golf Club (1902–1907), at Tramore in Ireland (1907–1909) and, finally, at Beckenham in Kent (1909–1911). His cousin Walter was also a professional golfer.

== Golf career ==
=== 1894 Open Championship ===
The 1894 Open Championship was held 11–12 June at Royal St George's Golf Club in Sandwich, England. English professional J.H. Taylor won the Championship by five strokes from runner-up Douglas Rolland. This was the first Open Championship held outside Scotland. Toogood played superb golf—mastering the high winds that blew during the tournament, particularly on day one—and finished in fourth place and took home £7 in prize money. His score was 84-85-82-82=333.

=== 1895 Open Championship ===
The 1895 Open Championship was held 12–13 June at the Old Course at St Andrews, Fife, Scotland. Defending champion J.H. Taylor won the Championship for the second time, by four strokes from runner-up Sandy Herd. Toogood didn't fare as well as he did in the previous year's Open but he still managed a top-10, finishing in a tie for ninth place with the brother duo of Harry and Tom Vardon and Ben Sayers. He won £2 as his share of the purse with a score of 85-84-83-86=338.

=== 1904 News of the World PGA Match Play Championship ===
Toogood was runner-up to J.H. Taylor in the 1904 News of the World PGA Match Play Championship which was contested at Royal Mid-Surrey Golf Club. In very windy conditions Toogood had a terrible first round in the final. He was 6 down after 9 holes and 8 down after 17 before Taylor missed a short putt at the last to be just 7 up at lunch. Play was easier in the afternoon and Toogood's golf was much better. Taylor, however, was still 7 up with 8 holes to play. Toogood then won the 11th, 12th and 13th to reduce the lead to 4 holes before the 14th was halved and Taylor won the 15th to win 5 and 3. In the 1905 News of the World PGA Match Play Championship, Toogood defeated Tom Simpson at the last-16 stage.

=== 1905 Tooting Bec Cup ===
Toogood won the 1905 Tooting Bec Cup. The event was a 36-hole stroke play event held on 3 May at Northwood Golf Club. James Braid led after the first round with a 74, with Toogood scoring 77. Braid had a poor second round of 79 and Toogood took the lead with a 73. J.H. Taylor missed an 8-foot putt to tie Toogood and finished second. The Tooting Bec Cup is currently awarded each year by the Professional Golfers' Association of Great Britain and Ireland to the association member born in, or with a parent or parents born in, the United Kingdom or Republic of Ireland who returns the lowest single-round score in The Open Championship.

=== 1907 London Professional Foursomes Tournament ===
Toogood and Rowland Jones reached the final of the 1907 London Professional Foursomes Tournament. They were to play Ralph Smith and Albert Tingey, Sr. and the match was arranged for 27 February. However, Jones had arranged to play in Grand Duke Michael's Tournament in Cannes on 26 and 27 February and so could not play on the pre-arranged date. It was suggested that the final be postponed but it was argued that Jones should not have entered unless he was available and so Smith and Tingey claimed the final.

In late August a 108-hole match was arranged on the Isle of Wight between the finalists. 36 holes were played on three successive days on three different courses, at St Helens, the Needles and Sandown. Jones and Toogood, both of whom were from the Isle of Wight, won comfortably 12 and 10.

== Family ==
Toogood's son, Alf, was also a golf professional, winning the South Australian Professional Championship twice and the Tasmanian Open twice. His grandson, Peter Toogood, was a leading amateur golfer in the late 1940s and 1950s who won the Tasmanian Open eight times, including six consecutive: 1949, 1951, 1954–59. Peter Toogood was also the leading amateur four times in the Australian Open, and in 1954 was the leading amateur in The Open Championship.

== Death ==
Toogood died in 1928 at South Norwood, London, England.

== Tournament wins (2) ==
- 1899 Midland Professional Championship
- 1905 Tooting Bec Cup

== Results in major championships ==
Tournament	1894	1895	1896	1897	1898	1899
The Open Championship	4	T9	17	T22	DNP	23

Tournament	1900	1901	1902	1903	1904	1905	1906	1907	1908
The Open Championship	DNP	DNP	DNP	T18	T12	WD	CUT	24	T18

Note: Toogood only played in The Open Championship.

DNP = Did not play
CUT = Missed the half-way cut
WD = Withdrew
Yellow background for top-10

== Team appearances ==
- England–Scotland Professional Match (representing England): 1904 (tie), 1905 (tie), 1906 (winners) 1907 (winners)
- Ireland–Scotland Professional Match (representing Ireland): 1907 (winners)
