= Fred Robson =

English golfer (1885–1952)

Personal information
- Full name: Frederick Robson
- Nationality: England
- Born: 25 April 1885 Shotton, Flintshire, Wales
- Died: 3 November 1952 (aged 67) Croydon, London, England

Career
- Sport: Golf
- Status: Professional
- Professional wins: 3

Best results in major championships
- Masters Tournament: DNP
- PGA Championship: DNP
- U.S. Open: DNP
- The Open Championship: T2: 1927

Frederick Robson (25 April 1885 – 3 November 1952) was an English professional golfer who played in the early 20th century. Robson was a frequent competitor in the Open Championship. His best performance was a tie for second with Aubrey Boomer in the 1927 Open Championship.

== Early life ==
Robson was born in Shotton, Flintshire, Wales, on 25 April 1885.

== Golf career ==
Robson was involved in a dispute about which team he would represent in the 1909 England–Scotland Professional Match. He apparently had a Scottish father and English mother and was initially selected for both sides. Having learnt his golf in England he eventually chose to represent that country. A meeting of the PGA on the following Monday accepted the principle that the player could choose in such situations. However this account is contradicted by the 1891 census of Wales which records that his father was born in Birmingham and mother in Holywell.

=== 1927 Open Championship ===
The 1927 Open Championship was the 62nd Open Championship, held 13–15 July at the Old Course at St Andrews in St Andrews, Scotland. Amateur Bobby Jones successfully defended the title with a dominating six stroke victory, the second of his three victories at the Open Championship. Robson carded rounds of 76-72-69-74=291 and finished in second place, tied with Aubrey Boomer. He and Boomer each won £62 10s in prize money.

Robson also played on the three Great Britain Ryder Cup teams in 1927, 1929, and 1931.

== Death and legacy ==
Robson died on 3 November 1952 in Croydon, London, England, at the age of 67. Robson is best remembered for his numerous starts in the Open Championship, the best of which was a second-place finish in 1927. He was also a Ryder Cup player.

== Tournament wins ==
Note: This list may be incomplete

- 1911 Southern Professional Foursomes Tournament (with Tom Ball)
- 1924 Yorkshire Evening News Tournament
- 1939 True Temper Foursomes Tournament (with Dick Burton)

== Results in major championships ==
Tournament	1908	1909
The Open Championship	T18	T31

Tournament	1910	1911	1912	1913	1914	1915	1916	1917	1918	1919
The Open Championship	T5	T10		WD	T41	NT	NT	NT	NT	NT

Tournament	1920	1921	1922	1923	1924	1925	1926	1927	1928	1929
The Open Championship		T51		T29	T23	T11	T18	T2	T4	T36

Tournament	1930	1931	1932	1933	1934	1935	1936	1937	1938	1939
The Open Championship	T4	T21	9	T37	T58				WD	CUT

Note: Robson only played in The Open Championship.

Top 10
Did not play

NT = No tournament
WD = withdrew
CUT = missed the half-way cut
"T" indicates a tie for a place

== Team appearances ==
- England–Scotland Professional Match (representing England): 1909 (winners), 1910 (winners)
- Coronation Match (representing the Professionals): 1911 (winners)
- Great Britain vs USA (representing Great Britain): 1926 (winners)
- Ryder Cup (representing Great Britain): 1927, 1929 (winners), 1931
- Seniors vs Juniors (representing the Seniors): 1928 (winners)
