= Arnaud Massy =

French professional golfer (1877–1950)

- Massy (c. 1919)

Personal information
- Full name: Arnaud George Watson Massy
- Nationality: France
- Born: 6 July 1877 Biarritz, France
- Died: 16 April 1950 (aged 72) Étretat, France

Career
- Sport: Golf
- Status: Professional
- Professional wins: 20

Best results in major championships (wins: 1)
- Masters Tournament: DNP
- PGA Championship: DNP
- U.S. Open: DNP
- The Open Championship: Won: 1907

Arnaud George Watson Massy (French pronunciation: [aʁno masi]; 6 July 1877 – 16 April 1950) was one of France's most successful professional golfers, most notable for winning the 1907 Open Championship. He was the first player from outside Scotland and England to win a major golf championship.

== Early life ==
In 1877, Massy was born in Biarritz, Pyrénées-Atlantiques, France. The son of a sheep farmer, he worked on a sardine boat and supplemented his income by caddying at the new Biarritz golf course where a great many of the best professional golfers from Britain came to practice during the off-season in the warm climate of southern France.

== Professional career ==
Blessed with natural abilities, he learned much from British pros while at Biarritz and in 1898 traveled to North Berwick, Scotland to develop his skills for a professional career.

In 1906, Massy won the first edition of the French Open played at a Paris course. The following year he won it again, defeating a strong contingent of British players including the great Harry Vardon. But Massy wasn't through, he followed up his French national championship by becoming the first non-Briton to win 1907 Open Championship. His victory raised the profile of the game in his native France, and with three other major players, he put on exhibition matches in various European cities that contributed significantly to the increased popularity of golf on the continent.

In 1910, Massy won the inaugural Belgian Open and in 1911 was the runner-up at the 1911 Open Championship to Harry Vardon. That year, Massy completed his book on golfing that was successfully published in France then translated into English for the British market. In 1912, he won the first Spanish Open ever played.

In 1913 he played in the France–United States Professional Match. In 1926 he won an exhibition match against Bobby Jones in France.

Massy's golfing career had to be put on hold as a result of World War I. While serving in the French army he was wounded at Verdun but at war's end was able to return to golfing. At age 41, he had lost four prime years and struggled to compete. Remarkably, in 1925 at age 48, he won the French Open for the fourth time and then won back-to-back Spanish Opens in 1927–28. When his career finally wound down he worked as a pro at courses in England, France and Morocco. Married to a British woman, Janet Henderson, originally from North Berwick, East Lothian, he lived in Edinburgh, Scotland, during the 1920s and early 1930s.

== Death and legacy ==
Massy retired in Étretat, Seine-Maritime in Upper Normandy where he died in 1950 in poverty. He remains the only French golfer to ever have won any of the four men's major championships. He was also the only golfer from continental Europe to win a men's major championship before Seve Ballesteros won 1979 Open Championship.

He is buried in Newington Cemetery in Edinburgh, where a new headstone was recently erected by the European Golf Association, Golf Collectors and The R&A. However shortly after the ceremony it was discovered that the actual burial site was located nearby in the cemetery. Despite this discrepancy, the headstone remains in its incorrect location. There is a plaque commemorating him fixed on the wall of the house he originally lived in North Berwick, East Lothian, in Forth Street there.

== Professional wins ==
Note: This list may be incomplete.

- 1906 French Open
- 1907 Grand Duke Michael's Tournament, **The Open Championship**, French Open
- 1908 Blackpool Professional Tournament (England), Turnberry Professional Tournament (Scotland)
- 1909 Pitlochry Professional Tournament (Scotland)
- 1910 Belgian Open
- 1911 French Open, Championnat de France Pro
- 1912 Spanish Open
- 1913 Championnat de France Pro
- 1914 Championnat de France Pro
- 1919 Inter-Allied Games
- 1921 Tooting Bec Cup
- 1925 French Open, Championnat de France Pro
- 1926 French Native Open
- 1927 Spanish Open
- 1928 Spanish Open

Professional majors shown in bold.

== Major championships ==
=== Wins (1) ===
Year	Championship	54 holes	Winning score	Margin	Runner-up
1907	The Open Championship	1 shot deficit	76-81-78-77=312	2 strokes	(England) J.H. Taylor

=== Results timeline ===
Tournament	1902	1903	1904	1905	1906	1907	1908	1909
The Open Championship	T10	T37	WD	T5	6	**1**	T9	T35

Tournament	1910	1911	1912	1913	1914	1915	1916	1917	1918	1919
The Open Championship	T22	2	10	T7	T10	NT	NT	NT	NT	NT

Tournament	1920	1921	1922	1923	1924	1925	1926	1927	1928	1929	1930
The Open Championship	T29	T6	WD		WD	WD			T41	CUT	CUT

Note: Massy only played in The Open Championship

Win
Top 10
Did not play

WD = Withdrew
NT = No tournament
CUT = missed the half-way cut
"T" indicates a tie for a place

== Team appearances ==
- Coronation Match (representing the Professionals): 1911 (winners)
- France–United States Professional Match (representing France): 1913 (winners)
- Inter-Allied Games (representing France): 1919 (winners)
- France–Great Britain Professional Match (representing France): 1929
