= Jack Rowe (golfer) =

English golfer (1870–1962)

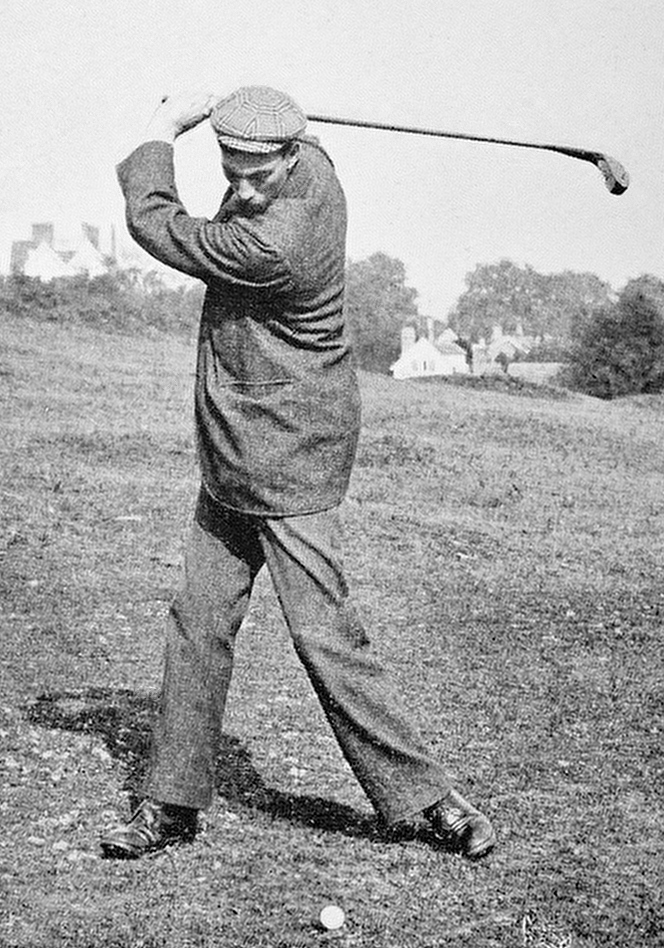
- Rowe c. 1900

Personal information
- Full name: Arthur John Rowe
- Nationality: England
- Born: 1870 Northam, Devon, England
- Died: 11 February 1962 (aged 91) Forest Row, Sussex, England

Career
- Sport: Golf
- Status: Professional
- Professional wins: 2

Best results in major championships
- Masters Tournament: DNP
- PGA Championship: DNP
- U.S. Open: DNP
- The Open Championship: T11: 1905

Arthur John "Jack" Rowe (1870 – 11 February 1962) was an English professional golfer. Rowe won a tournament at Westward Ho! in 1899 while his best finish in the Open Championship was in 1905 where he finished in a tie for 11th place. He played three times for England against Scotland between 1903 and 1907 and was a professional at Royal Ashdown Forest Golf Club for 55 years.

== Early life ==
Rowe was born in Northam, Devon close to Westward Ho! and the Royal North Devon Golf Club.

== Golf career ==
Rowe was a professional at Douglas, Isle of Man but moved to Royal Ashdown Forest Golf Club on 29 September 1892.

Rowe first played in the Open Championship in 1894 at Royal St George's Golf Club where he finished 23rd. Rowe won a tournament at the Royal North Devon Golf Club in August 1899, where he beat James Braid 3&2 in the 18-hole final. His best finish in The Open was in 1905 when he tied for 11th place. He played for England against Scotland 3 times between 1903 and 1907. He last qualified for the Open Championship in 1924, finishing tied for 47th place. He made his last attempt to qualify at St Andrews in 1939, scoring 77 on the Old Course on the first day but then taking 94 on the New Course.

Rowe retired at professional at Royal Ashdown Forest in 1947 after 55 years service. He played a fourball match to mark the occasion and went round the course in 76, exactly his age. He was presented with a clock and cheque.

== Death ==
Rowe died on 11 February 1962 aged 91. He was still living in Forest Row close to the Royal Ashdown Forest Golf Club.

== Tournament wins (2) ==
Note: This list may be incomplete.

- 1899 Westward Ho! Tournament
- 1908 Sussex Professional Tournament

== Results in major championships ==
Tournament	1894	1895	1896	1897	1898	1899
The Open Championship	T23		31	28	T32	31

Tournament	1900	1901	1902	1903	1904	1905	1906	1907	1908	1909
The Open Championship			T15	CUT	T16	T11	CUT	23		

Tournament	1910	1911	1912	1913	1914	1915	1916	1917	1918	1919
The Open Championship	T22	T35		T34		NT	NT	NT	NT	NT

Tournament	1920	1921	1922	1923	1924
The Open Championship	T50				T47

Note: Rowe only played in The Open Championship.

Did not play

NT = No tournament
CUT = missed the half-way cut
"T" indicates a tie for a place

== Team appearances ==
- England–Scotland Professional Match (representing England): 1903, 1906 (winners) 1907 (winners)
