= Tom Ball (golfer) =

English professional golfer (1882–1919)

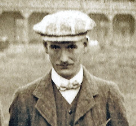
- Ball, c. 1918

Personal information
- Full name: Thomas John Ball
- Nationality: England
- Born: 27 June 1882 Hoylake, England
- Died: 18 February 1919 (aged 36) Wimbledon, Surrey, England

Career
- Sport: Golf
- Status: Professional
- Professional wins: 7

Best results in major championships
- Masters Tournament: DNP
- PGA Championship: DNP
- U.S. Open: DNP
- The Open Championship: 2nd/T2: 1908, 1909

Thomas John Ball (27 June 1882 – 18 February 1919) was an English professional golfer. Ball placed second in the 1908 Open Championship and tied for second place in the 1909 Open Championship. He won the Belgian Open twice, in 1913 and again in 1914. He won the 1909 News of the World Match Play tournament.

== Golf career ==
=== 1908 Open Championship ===
The 1908 Open Championship was held 18–19 June at Prestwick Golf Club in Prestwick, South Ayrshire, Scotland. Scottish professional James Braid won the Championship for the fourth time, eight strokes ahead of runner-up Ball. Ball's round-by-round scores were 76-73-76-74=299. The primary difference between Ball's score and Braid's was the first round scoring when Braid's superb 70 put him in excellent position to win—which he eventually did. Ball took home £25 for his fine performance.

=== 1909 Open Championship ===
The 1909 Open Championship was held 10–11 June at Royal Cinque Ports Golf Club in Deal, Kent, England. English star J.H. Taylor won the Championship for the fourth time, six strokes ahead of runners-up Ball and James Braid. Ball carded rounds of 74-75-76-76=301—winning £20 in the process—and finished six shots behind the winning score of 295 posted by J.H. Taylor.

== Family ==
Ball's father, William (1856–1926), was a greenkeeper from Hoylake. His brothers Sydney, William Henry (Harry) and Frank were also professional golfers, as was Harry's son Errie.

== Death and legacy ==
Ball died on 18 February 1919 in Wimbledon, Surrey, England. He is best remembered for having three top-10 finishes in the Open Championship, including a second-place finish in 1908.

== Tournament wins (7) ==
Note: This list may be incomplete.

- 1908 Leeds Cup
- 1909 News of the World Match Play, Liverpool and District Professional Championship
- 1910 Liverpool and District Professional Championship
- 1911 Southern Professional Foursomes Tournament (with Fred Robson),
- 1913 Belgian Open
- 1914 Belgian Open

== Results in major championships ==
Tournament	1902	1903	1904	1905	1906	1907	1908	1909	1910	1911	1912	1913	1914
The Open Championship	CUT		CUT		T24	10	2	T2	T12	15	26	T30	WD

Note: Ball only played in The Open Championship.

Top 10
Did not play

WD = withdrew
CUT = missed the half-way cut
"T" indicates a tie for a place

== Team appearances ==
- England–Scotland Professional Match (representing England): 1909 (winners), 1910 (winners), 1912 (tie), 1913 (winners)
- Coronation Match (representing the Professionals): 1911 (winners)
