= 1919 News of the World Match Play =

Twelfth News of the World Match Play golf tournament

Coordinates: 51°16′40″N 0°14′45″W

Tournament information
- Dates: 29 September – 2 October 1919
- Location: Walton-on-the-Hill, Surrey, England
- Course: Walton Heath Golf Club
- Organised by: The PGA
- Format: Match play – 18 holes (Final 36 holes)

Statistics
- Field: 64 players
- Prize fund: £590
- Winner's share: £100

Champion
- (England) Abe Mitchell
- def. George Duncan 1 up

Location in England

The 1919 News of the World Match Play was the twelfth News of the World Match Play tournament. It was played from Monday 29 September to Thursday 2 October at Walton Heath Golf Club. 64 players competed in a straight knock-out competition, with each match contested over 18 holes, except for the final which was over 36 holes. The winner received £100 out of a total prize fund of £590. Abe Mitchell defeated George Duncan by 1 hole in the final to win the tournament. It was Mitchell's first appearance in the event.

The event coincided with a rail strike which started on 27 September. The P.G.A. initially decided to postpone the event but, with most of the competitors having already arrived in the area, later decided to carry on with the original arrangements. In the end, 6 of the 64 qualifiers did not compete.

== Qualification ==
Qualification was by a series of 36-hole stroke-play competitions; one for each of the eight PGA sections. The Southern section had 26 qualifiers, the Northern section 12, the Midland section 10, the Scottish section 5, the Welsh and West of England sections 4, the Eastern section 2 and the Irish section 1. The Southern section was played over two days. In the event of a tie for places there was a playoff.

Qualifying events:

- 2 July West of England section at Weston-super-Mare: Ernest Whitcombe won by 1 stroke on 148. When the event was held only two places were allocated but this was later increased to four.
- 20 August Irish section at Bangor: Pat O'Hara won by 4 strokes on 142.
- 3 September Midland section at Sandwell Park: Len Holland and Bert Weastell tied on 149. The event was also the 1919 Midland Professional Championship. Weastell beat Holland in a playoff to win the Championship.
- 3 September Northern section at Stockport: Arthur Day and Andrew Kay tied on 148.
- 17 and 18 September Southern section at Sonning-on-Thames: Sandy Herd, Abe Mitchell, Ted Ray tied on 146. Four players tied on 155 for the final two places and played an 18-hole playoff the following day. Eric Bannister and Bert Seymour qualified with scores of 77.
- 23 September Scottish section at Bruntsfield Links: Tom Fernie won by a stroke on 141. Arthur Butchart and Alex Marling tied for fifth place on 149. Butchart won the 9-hole playoff 37 to 40.
- 24 September Eastern section at Brancaster: Arthur Havers won by 3 strokes on 154. Clifford Holland and Ernest Riseborough tied for second place on 157 but Riseborough won the playoff.
- 24 September Welsh section at Radyr: Cyril Hughes won by 1 stroke on 152. There was a four-way playoff for the fourth place. This was won by Tom Grant.

The qualifiers were:

- West of England section: Fred Boobyer, Sr., Charles Whitcombe, Ernest Whitcombe, Reg Whitcombe
- Irish section: Pat O'Hara
- Midland section: James Adwick, George Buckle, Archie Compston, William Hamlet, Len Holland, Mark Lewis, Hugh Roberts, W. G. Saunders, Bert Weastell, Tom Williamson
- Northern section: Walter Bourne, Tom Brace, Arthur Day, Harry Fernie, Jack Gaudin, Andrew Kay, Dick May, Peter Rainford, James Scarth, Jack Steer, Sam Whiting, Syd Wingate
- Southern section: Alf Baker, Eric Bannister, James Batley, Aubrey Boomer, George Duncan, George Gadd, Sandy Herd, William Horne, Charles Johns, Rowland Jones, Henry Kinch, Fred Leach, Charles Mayo, Arthur Mitchell, Abe Mitchell, Harry Monk, James Ockenden, Charlie Parsons, Ted Ray, Fred Robson, Bert Seymour, Ralph Smith, Josh Taylor, Charles Wallis, Reg Wilson, Arthur Young
- Scottish section: Laurie Ayton, Snr, Arthur Butchart, Tom Fernie, James Souter, Wilfred Thomson
- Eastern section: Arthur Havers, Ernest Riseborough
- Welsh section: Harry Ball, Gus Faulkner, Tom Grant, Cyril Hughes

None of the Great Triumvirate qualified.

== Format ==
It was decided in July that the number of qualifiers would be increased from 32 to 64 and the "News of the World" agreed to increase the prize money. Matches were over 18 holes except for the final which was over 36 holes. Extra holes were played in the event of a tied match. The event was extended from three to four days with one round played on the first day, two rounds on the second and third days and the final on the fourth day.

== Results ==
First round
29 September

Winner	Result	Loser
(England) Alf Baker	w/o	(England) James Ockenden
(England) George Gadd	5 & 4	(England) Mark Lewis
(Scotland) Harry Fernie	3 & 2	(England) Walter Bourne
(England) Hugh Roberts	4 & 3	(Scotland) Sandy Herd
(Jersey) Jack Gaudin	1 up	(England) Ernest Whitcombe
(England) William Horne	1 up	(England) Charles Whitcombe
(England) Arthur Mitchell	3 & 2	(England) Arthur Young
(England) Peter Rainford	19 h	(Jersey) Ted Ray
(Scotland) Ralph Smith	3 & 2	(Wales) Tom Brace
(Scotland) George Duncan	5 & 4	(Scotland) Andrew Kay
(Scotland) Laurie Ayton, Snr	w/o	(England) Len Holland
(England) Bert Weastell	4 & 3	(England) Jack Steer
(England) Sam Whiting	w/o	(England) Archie Compston
(England) James Adwick	2 up	(England) George Buckle
(England) Dick May	2 up	(England) Reg Whitcombe
(England) Harry Ball	w/o	(England) Charlie Parsons

Winner	Result	Loser
(England) Ernest Riseborough	21 h	(Jersey) Aubrey Boomer
(England) Reg Wilson	6 & 4	(England) William Hamlet
(England) Tom Williamson	3 & 1	(Scotland) James Souter
(England) Charles Mayo	9 & 8	(England) Gus Faulkner
(England) Josh Taylor	4 & 3	(Scotland) Wilfred Thomson
(Scotland) Tom Grant	1 up	(Scotland) Tom Fernie
(England) Fred Robson	1 up	(England) Fred Boobyer, Sr.
(England) Fred Leach	3 & 2	(England) Henry Kinch
(England) Eric Bannister	2 & 1	(England) Harry Monk
(England) Syd Wingate	5 & 4	(England) Charles Wallis
(England) Arthur Havers	4 & 3	(England) Cyril Hughes
(England) Rowland Jones	w/o	(Scotland) Arthur Butchart
(England) Abe Mitchell	2 & 1	(England) James Batley
(England) Bert Seymour	w/o	(England) W. G. Saunders
(England) Charles Johns	3 & 2	(Republic of Ireland) Pat O'Hara
(England) James Scarth	1 up	(England) Arthur Day

Second round 30 September
(England) Alf Baker
(England) George Gadd	19h
(Scotland) Harry Fernie
(England) Hugh Roberts	6&5
(Jersey) Jack Gaudin	3&1
(England) William Horne
(England) Arthur Mitchell
(England) Peter Rainford	3&2
(Scotland) Ralph Smith
(Scotland) George Duncan	6&5
(Scotland) Laurie Ayton, Snr	4&3
(England) Bert Weastell
(England) Sam Whiting	3&1
(England) James Adwick
(England) Dick May	3&2
(England) Harry Ball
(England) Ernest Riseborough	4&2
(England) Reg Wilson
(England) Tom Williamson	2up
(England) Charles Mayo
(England) Josh Taylor	2&1
(Scotland) Tom Grant
(England) Fred Robson	3&2
(England) Fred Leach
(England) Eric Bannister
(England) Syd Wingate	1up
(England) Arthur Havers
(England) Rowland Jones	2up
(England) Abe Mitchell	1up
(England) Bert Seymour
(England) Charles Johns	5&4
(England) James Scarth

Third round 30 September
(England) George Gadd
(England) Hugh Roberts	19h
(Jersey) Jack Gaudin
(England) Peter Rainford	3&2
(Scotland) George Duncan	19h
(Scotland) Laurie Ayton, Snr
(England) Sam Whiting	6&5
(England) Dick May
(England) Ernest Riseborough
(England) Tom Williamson	5&3
(England) Josh Taylor
(England) Fred Robson	6&5
(England) Syd Wingate
(England) Rowland Jones	4&3
(England) Abe Mitchell	2&1
(England) Charles Johns

Fourth round 1 October
(England) Hugh Roberts
(England) Peter Rainford	19h
(Scotland) George Duncan	19h
(England) Sam Whiting
(England) Tom Williamson
(England) Fred Robson	3&2
(England) Rowland Jones
(England) Abe Mitchell	20h

Semi-finals; 1 October
(England) Peter Rainford
(Scotland) George Duncan	5&4
(England) Fred Robson
(England) Abe Mitchell	6&4

Final; 2 October
(Scotland) George Duncan
(England) Abe Mitchell	1up

== Prize money ==
The winner received £100 and a gold medal, the runner-up received £40 and a silver medal, losing semi-finalists £20 and a bronze medal, losing quarter-finalists £12 10s, third round losers £10, second round losers £7 10s and first round losers £5.
