= 1911 News of the World Match Play =

Ninth News of the World Match Play golf tournament

Coordinates: 51°16′40″N 0°14′45″W

Tournament information
- Dates: 3–5 October 1911
- Location: Walton-on-the-Hill, Surrey, England
- Course: Walton Heath Golf Club
- Organised by: The PGA
- Format: Match play – 18 holes (Final 36 holes)

Statistics
- Field: 32 players
- Prize fund: £400
- Winner's share: £100

Champion
- (Scotland) James Braid
- def. Ted Ray 1 up

Location in England

The 1911 News of the World Match Play was the ninth News of the World Match Play tournament, played from 3 to 5 October 1911 at the Walton Heath Golf Club. 32 players competed in a straight knock-out competition, with each match contested over 18 holes, except for the final which was over 36 holes.

The winner received £100 out of a total prize fund of £400. James Braid defeated Ted Ray by 1 hole in the final to win the tournament.

== Qualification ==
Entry was restricted to members of the Professional Golfers' Association (PGA). Qualification was by a series of 36-hole stroke-play competitions; one for each of the eight PGA sections. The Southern section had 12 qualifiers, the Northern section 7, the Midland section 5, the Scottish, Welsh and Western sections 2 and the Eastern and Irish sections 1. Because of the large number of entries in the Southern section, two events were run with 6 qualifiers at each venue. Compared to 1910, the number of qualifiers from the Southern section was reduced by one with the Midland section increasing by one. In the event of a tie for places there was a playoff.

The qualifiers were:

- Eastern section: Ernest Riseborough
- Irish section: Charlie Pope
- Midland section: James Adwick, Jack Bloxham, Len Holland, George Tuck, Tom Williamson
- Northern section: Jack Gaudin, Walter Hambleton, Cyril Hughes, Bill Leaver, Ted Ray, Thomas Renouf, Sam Whiting
- Southern section at Acton Golf Club: James Braid, George Duncan, Fred Leach, James Sherlock, Josh Taylor, Harry Vardon
- Southern section at West Drayton Golf Club: Laurie Ayton, Snr, James Batley, Arthur Catlin, Sandy Herd, Charles Mayo, Fred Robson
- Scottish section: Tom Fernie, Willie Watt
- Western section: Ernest Firstbrook, Herbert Osborne
- Welsh section: Syd Ball, Peter Rainford

== Format ==
The format was unchanged. Matches were over 18 holes except for the final which was over 36 holes. Extra holes were played in the event of a tied match. Two rounds were played on the first day, two more on the second day with the final on the third day.

== Results ==
First round 3 October
(England) Walter Hambleton	1up
(England) Charles Mayo
(England) Sam Whiting
(Scotland) Tom Fernie	5&4
(England) Jack Bloxham
(Jersey) Ted Ray	3&2
(England) Arthur Catlin	1up
(England) Fred Robson
(England) Josh Taylor
(England) Cyril Hughes	5&4
(Scotland) Laurie Ayton, Snr
(England) James Adwick	2up
(England) James Batley
(Jersey) Harry Vardon	2&1
(Scotland) George Duncan
(Jersey) Jack Gaudin	w/o
(Scotland) James Braid	5&3
(Scotland) Willie Watt
(England) Fred Leach
(England) Ernest Riseborough	1up
(England) George Tuck	4&3
(England) Ernest Firstbrook
(England) Herbert Osborne
(England) Syd Ball	3&2
(England) Bill Leaver	3&2
(Jersey) Thomas Renouf
(England) Charlie Pope
(England) Peter Rainford	2&1
(England) Len Holland
(England) Tom Williamson	3&2
(England) James Sherlock	20h
(Scotland) Sandy Herd

Second round 3 October
(England) Walter Hambleton
(Scotland) Tom Fernie	1up
(Jersey) Ted Ray	6&5
(England) Arthur Catlin
(England) Cyril Hughes	1up
(England) James Adwick
(Jersey) Harry Vardon	7&5
(Jersey) Jack Gaudin
(Scotland) James Braid	4&3
(England) Ernest Riseborough
(England) George Tuck
(England) Syd Ball	1up
(England) Bill Leaver	2&1
(England) Peter Rainford
(England) Tom Williamson	3&2
(England) James Sherlock

Third round 4 October
(Scotland) Tom Fernie
(Jersey) Ted Ray	6&4
(England) Cyril Hughes
(Jersey) Harry Vardon	3&2
(Scotland) James Braid	6&5
(England) Syd Ball
(England) Bill Leaver
(England) Tom Williamson	3&2

Semi-finals; 4 October
(Jersey) Ted Ray	3&1
(Jersey) Harry Vardon
(Scotland) James Braid	22h
(England) Tom Williamson

Final; 5 October
(Jersey) Ted Ray
(Scotland) James Braid	1up

w/o = Walk over

== Prize money ==
Prize money was increased to £400. The winner still received £100 and a gold medal, but the runner-up now received £40 and a silver medal, losing semi-finalists £20 and a bronze medal, losing quarter-finalists £15, second round losers £10 and first round losers £5. The new distribution meant that all 32 qualifiers for the final stages received at least £5.
