= 1913 Open Championship =

1913 golf tournament held at the Royal Liverpool Golf Club, Hoylake, Wirral, England

Coordinates: 53.385°N 3.190°W

Tournament information
- Dates: 23–24 June 1913
- Location: Hoylake, England
- Course: Royal Liverpool Golf Club

Statistics
- Length: 6,480 yards (5,925 m)
- Field: 65 players
- Cut: none
- Prize fund: £125
- Winner's share: £50

Champion
- (England) J.H. Taylor
- 304

Location in England
Royal Liverpool Golf Club in Hoylake, Merseyside, west of Liverpool, England

The 1913 Open Championship was the 53rd Open Championship, held 23–24 June at Royal Liverpool Golf Club in Hoylake, England. J.H. Taylor won the championship for the fifth and final time, eight strokes ahead of runner-up Ted Ray, the defending champion.

Qualifying took place on 19, 20, and 21 June. The top twenty and ties qualified on each of the three days. In windy conditions Laurie Ayton, Snr led the 21 qualifiers on the first day with a score of 152, with 159 as the qualifying score. Conditions were better on the second day and 156 was the qualifying mark; amateur Edward Blackwell led the 21 qualifiers with 147. Jack Gaudin led the 23 qualifiers on the third day with 148, with 157 as the qualifying score. Seven American-based professionals entered but only two qualified, John McDermott and Tom McNamara. Mike Brady, Alex Campbell, Stewart Maiden, and Alex Smith failed on the first day, while John Jones failed on the third day.

Ray led after the first two rounds on Monday with 147; Taylor was at 148, Michael Moran at 150, and Thomas Renouf had 153.

Gale-force winds on Tuesday led to high scoring in the final two rounds. Taylor and McDermott had the best scores in the morning at 77. Ray struggled and completed the circuit in 81, to trail Taylor by three shots, while McDermott was a further 4 strokes behind. Moran's chances were ruined by a third round 89 which included a ten at the first. In the final round that afternoon, Taylor holed from about 50 yards at the 14th, while his nearest rivals had poor starts to their rounds, Ray took eight at the third hole while McDermott took seven at the first. Moran had the best final round at 74, fifteen strokes better than his morning score, and tied for third.

The win was the fifteenth Open title for the Great Triumvurate of Taylor, Vardon, and James Braid, with five each. Vardon won a record sixth the following year, the last Open victory for the three players.

== Course ==
Hole	Name	Yards	Hole	Name	Yards
1	Course	420	10	Dee	400
2	Road	330	11	Alps	190
3	Long	490	12	Hilbre	355
4	New	155	13	Rushes	130
5	Telegraph	410	14	Field	485
6	Briars	365	15	Lake	440
7	Dowie	200	16	Dun	510
8	Far	480	17	Royal	360
9	Punch Bowl	380	18	Stand	400
Out		3,210	In		3,270
Source:			Total		6,480

== Round summaries ==
=== First round ===
Monday, 23 June 1913 (morning)

Place	Player	Score
T1	(Scotland) Sandy Herd	73
T1	(Jersey) Ted Ray	73
T1	(England) J.H. Taylor	73
T4	(England) Albert Howlett	75
T4	(England) Ernest Jones	75
T4	(United States) John McDermott	75
T4	(Jersey) Thomas Renouf	75
T4	(Scotland) Jack B. Ross	75
T9	(England) Cyril Hughes	76
T9	(Ireland) Michael Moran	76

=== Second round ===
Monday, 23 June 1913 (afternoon)

Place	Player	Score
1	(Jersey) Ted Ray	73-74=147
2	(England) J.H. Taylor	73-75=148
3	(Ireland) Michael Moran	76-74=150
4	(Jersey) Thomas Renouf	75-78=153
T5	(England) Cyril Hughes	76-78=154
T5	(Scotland) Sandy Herd	73-81=154
T5	(Jersey) Harry Vardon	79-75=154
T8	(United States) John McDermott	75-80=155
T8	(England) Josh Taylor	80-75=155
10	(Scotland) John Graham, Jr.	77-79=156

=== Third round ===
Tuesday, 24 June 1913 (morning)

Place	Player	Score
1	(England) J.H. Taylor	73-75-77=225
2	(Jersey) Ted Ray	73-74-81=228
3	(United States) John McDermott	75-80-77=232
4	(Jersey) Harry Vardon	79-75-79=233
T5	(Scotland) John Graham, Jr. (a)	77-79-81=237
T5	(England) Cyril Hughes	76-78-83=237
T5	(England) Edward Lassen (a)	79-78-80=237
T5	(Jersey) Thomas Renouf	75-78-84=237
T5	(England) Tom Williamson	77-80-80=237
T10	(England) James Bradbeer	78-79-81=238
T10	(Scotland) Sandy Herd	73-81-84=238
T10	(France) Arnaud Massy	77-80-81=238

=== Final round ===
Tuesday, 24 June 1913 (afternoon)

Place	Player	Score	Money (£)
1	(England) J.H. Taylor	73-75-77-79=304	50
2	(Jersey) Ted Ray	73-74-81-84=312	25
T3	(Ireland) Michael Moran	76-74-89-74=313	12; 10s
T3	(Jersey) Harry Vardon	79-75-79-80=313	12; 10s
T5	(United States) John McDermott	75-80-77-83=315	7; 10s
T5	(Jersey) Thomas Renouf	75-78-84-78=315	7; 10s
T7	(England) James Bradbeer	78-79-81-79=317	2; 10s
T7	(France) Arnaud Massy	77-80-81-79=317	2; 10s
T7	(England) James Sherlock	77-86-79-75=317	2; 10s
T7	(England) Tom Williamson	77-80-80-80=317	2; 10s

Amateurs: Graham (318), Lassen (319), Crowther (328), Blackwell (333)
