= 1924 Open Championship =

1924 golf tournament held at the Royal Liverpool Golf Club, Hoylake, Wirral, England

Coordinates: 53.387°N 3.186°W

Tournament information
- Dates: 26–27 June 1924
- Location: Hoylake, England
- Course: Royal Liverpool Golf Club

Statistics
- Length: 6,750 yards (6,172 m)
- Field: 86 players
- Cut: none
- Prize fund: £200
- Winner's share: £75

Champion
- (United States) Walter Hagen
- 301

Location in England
Royal Liverpool Golf Club in Hoylake, Merseyside, west of Liverpool, England

The 1924 Open Championship was the 59th Open Championship, held 26–27 June at Royal Liverpool Golf Club in Hoylake, England. Walter Hagen won the second of his four Open Championships, one stroke ahead of runner-up Ernest Whitcombe. It was the fifth of Hagen's eleven major championships. Two years earlier in 1922, he became the Open's first winner born in the United States.

== Tournament summary ==
Qualifying took place on 23–24 June, Monday and Tuesday, with 18 holes at Royal Liverpool and 18 holes at Formby, and the top 80 and ties qualified. J.H. Taylor led the field on 142; Hagen took 83 on the first day at Hoylake and was in some danger of not qualifying, but after a 73 at Formby for 156 he made it safely through. The qualifying score was 158 and 86 players advanced. Six-time champion Harry Vardon had 159 and missed by one stroke. Wednesday was an idle day.

In the opening round on Thursday morning, Cyril Tolley, the 1920 British Amateur champion, took the lead with 73, but his 82 in the second round dropped him out of contention. After opening with 77, Whitcombe carded a 70 for 147 for a two-stroke lead over five-time champion J.H. Taylor; Hagen and Macdonald Smith were a stroke back in third place. In the two-day format, there was not a cut after 36 holes.

In the third round on Friday morning, Hagen had 74 and Whitcombe 77, and they shared the 54-hole lead at 224. Three strokes back in a tie for third were George Duncan, Frank Ball, and Smith. In the afternoon, Duncan had 81 for 308 while Ball and Smith both finished on 304, which left Hagen and Whitcombe to battle for the title. Whitcombe shot 43 on the front-nine but responded with a 35 on the back to post 302. Hagen also shot 43 on the front but played his trademark brand of golf on the back. He sliced his second shot on the 12th and his approach shot found a bunker on the 13th, but both times recovered with a pitch and a putt. Hagen sank a downhill 6-footer (1.8 m) on the final hole to win on 301, a one-stroke victory margin. Had the putt not dropped, a 36-hole playoff was in order for Saturday.

Smith was three strokes back in a tie for third place, one of twelve times he finished in the top-five of a major championship without a victory. Taylor finished in fifth at the age of 53, thirty years after his first Open title. Gene Sarazen, age 22, played in his first British Open this year and was 41st. He won the championship in 1932 and played in the Open as late as 1976.

== Round summaries ==
=== First round ===
Thursday, 26 June 1924 (morning)

Place	Player	Score
1	(England) Cyril Tolley (a)	73
T2	(Scotland) George Duncan	74
T2	(England) Len Holland	74
T2	(England) Mark Seymour	74
T5	(Jersey) Aubrey Boomer	75
T5	(England) J.H. Taylor	75
T5	(United States) Gilbert Nicholls	75
T8	(England) Albert Hallam	76
T8	(Scotland) Sandy Herd	76
T8	(United States) Macdonald Smith	76
T8	(England) Bert Weastell	76
T8	(England) Frank Weston	76

=== Second round ===
Thursday, 26 June 1924 (afternoon)

Place	Player	Score
1	(England) Ernest Whitcombe	77-70=147
2	(England) J.H. Taylor	75-74=149
T3	(United States) Walter Hagen	77-73=150
T3	(United States) Macdonald Smith	76-74=150
5	(England) James Sherlock	76-75=151
T6	(England) Len Holland	74-78=152
T6	(England) Fred Leach	78-74=152
T8	(England) Frank Ball	78-75=153
T8	(Jersey) Aubrey Boomer	75-78=153
T8	(Scotland) George Duncan	74-79=153
T8	(England) Rowland Jones	80-73=153
T8	(United States) Gilbert Nicholls	75-78=153
T8	(England) Frank Weston	76-77=153

=== Third round ===
Friday, 27 June 1924 (morning)

Place	Player	Score
T1	(United States) Walter Hagen	77-73-74=224
T1	(England) Ernest Whitcombe	77-70-77=224
T3	(England) Frank Ball	78-75-74=227
T3	(Scotland) George Duncan	74-79-74=227
T3	(United States) Macdonald Smith	76-74-77=227
6	(England) J.H. Taylor	75-74-79=228
T7	(Jersey) Aubrey Boomer	75-78-76=229
T7	(England) James Sherlock	76-75-78=229
T9	(England) Len Holland	74-78-78=230
T9	(England) Frank Weston	76-77-77=230

=== Final round ===
Friday, 27 June 1924 (afternoon)

Place	Player	Score	Money (£)
1	(United States) Walter Hagen	77-73-74-77=301	75
2	(England) Ernest Whitcombe	77-70-77-78=302	40
T3	(England) Frank Ball	78-75-74-77=304	20
T3	(United States) Macdonald Smith	76-74-77-77=304	20
5	(England) J.H. Taylor	75-74-79-79=307	10
T6	(Jersey) Aubrey Boomer	75-78-76-79=308	8; 6s 8d
T6	(Scotland) George Duncan	74-79-74-81=308	8; 6s 8d
T6	(England) Len Holland	74-78-78-78=308	8; 6s 8d
T9	(England) Jim Barnes	78-77-79-75=309	2; 10s
T9	(England) George Gadd	79-75-78-77=309	2; 10s
T9	(England) James Sherlock	76-75-78-80=309	2; 10s
T9	(England) Frank Weston	76-77-77-79=309	2; 10s

Amateurs: Tolley (314), Sutton (323), Hassall (328), Hope (328), Robinson (329), Walker (332)
