= 1920 Open Championship =

Coordinates: 51.2395°N 1.3965°E

Tournament information
- Dates: 30 June – 1 July 1920
- Location: Deal, England
- Course: Royal Cinque Ports Golf Club

Statistics
- Length: 6,653 yards (6,084 m)
- Field: 82 players
- Cut: none
- Prize fund: £200
- Winner's share: £75

Champion
- (Scotland) George Duncan
- 303

Location in England
Location in Kent. England

The 1920 Open Championship was the 55th Open Championship, held 30 June to 1 July at Royal Cinque Ports Golf Club in Deal, England. George Duncan erased a 13-stroke deficit after 36 holes to win his only major title, two strokes ahead of runner-up Sandy Herd, the 1902 champion.

Royal Cinque Ports had been planned as the location for the Open Championship in 1915, but in early in that year it was decided that there would be no championships during the remainder of World War I; the next Open Championship after the war would be held at Royal Cinque Ports. Although the war was over in November 1918, it was decided that there would be no championship in 1919. During the war, six of the greens were involved in a scheme to build a rifle range. This raised fears about the state of the course, but in late 1919 it was decided that there would be no difficulty in getting the course ready for the 1920 championship.

Qualification for the professionals took place the week before on 23 and 24 June at Burhill and Saint George's Hill in Surrey; the leading 72 players and ties qualified. Abe Mitchell led the field at 139; three tied on the qualifying score of 159 and 74 professionals advanced. The amateurs qualified separately, playing 36 holes on 23 June at Sandwich. Eight places were allotted to the amateurs with Cyril Tolley, the Amateur Champion, given an automatic entry. Prize money was increased sixty per cent to £200 with a winner's share of £75; the winner also received a gold medal valued at £25.

Herd and Ted Ray, the 1912 winner, shared the first round lead at 72 on Wednesday morning. Both faltered in the afternoon's second round while Abe Mitchell shot a 73 for a 147 to open up a six-stroke lead over Herd and Jim Barnes. Ray was eight back, Len Holland eleven behind, while Duncan was thirteen back after consecutive rounds of 80 for 160.

Duncan played himself back into contention with a 71 in the third round on Thursday morning. Mitchell began that round with three bogeys, made a seven at the 5th hole, and finished with an 84. After 54 holes, Holland was at 229 and led by one over Herd and Barnes, with Mitchell, Duncan, and Syd Wingate one behind in fourth. Duncan carded a final round 72 for 303, while Holland and Barnes both shot 79 for a 308 and 309, respectively. Mitchell rebounded with a 76 which left him at 307. Only Herd could match Duncan's score, but he found trouble on the 16th and settled for 305, two strokes back of Duncan.

Six-time and defending champion Harry Vardon, age 50, finished at 318, 15 strokes back in a tie for 14th place.

Two future champions from the United States, Walter Hagen and Scottish-born Tommy Armour, both made their Open Championship debuts this year and both finished at 329, 26 strokes back in a tie for 53rd. Armour was an amateur at the time.

This was the second and final Open Championship held at Royal Cinque Ports, which also hosted in 1909. Further Open Championships at Royal Cinque Ports were planned for 1938 and 1949. In both cases the course was flooded during the previous winter prior and the venue was moved to Royal St George's. Thus, only one of the four Opens planned for Royal Cinque Ports actually took place in the year originally intended. Near the English Channel, the course is directly south of Royal St George's, which became the sole Open venue in southern England in the course rota. An exception was in 1932, when Prince's Golf Club hosted its only Open, won by Gene Sarazen. All three courses are adjacent, with Prince's the furthest north.

== Course ==
Hole	Yards	Hole	Yards
1	330	10	367
2	376	11	441
3	476	12	471
4	150	13	431
5	475	14	195
6	282	15	417
7	383	16	483
8	136	17	372
9	454	18	414
Out	3,062	In	3,591
Source:		Total	6,653

== Round summaries ==
=== First round ===
Wednesday, 30 June 1920 (morning)

Place	Player	Score
T1	(Scotland) Sandy Herd	72
T1	(Jersey) Ted Ray	72
3	(England) Abe Mitchell	74
T4	(England) James Bradbeer	76
T4	(England) Reg Wilson	76
T6	(Isle of Man) Charles Corlett	77
T6	(England) Arthur Day	77
T6	(England) Tom Williamson	77
T9	(England) Eric Bannister	78
T9	(England) Charles Hope (a)	78
T9	(England) Arthur Monk	78
T9	(England) J.H. Taylor	78
T9	(England) Josh Taylor	78
T9	(England) Phil Taylor	78
T9	(Jersey) Harry Vardon	78

=== Second round ===
Wednesday, 30 June 1920 (afternoon)

Place	Player	Score
1	(England) Abe Mitchell	74-73=147
T2	(England) Jim Barnes	79-74=153
T2	(Scotland) Sandy Herd	72-81=153
T4	(Jersey) Ted Ray	72-83=155
T4	(England) Syd Wingate	81-74=155
6	(England) J.H. Taylor	78-79=157
T7	(England) Arthur Havers	80-78=158
T7	(England) Len Holland	80-78=158
T7	(England) Reg Wilson	76-82=158
T10	(Scotland) James Braid	79-80=159
T10	(Isle of Man) Charles Corlett	77-82=159
T10	(United States) Douglas Grant (a)	83-76=159
T10	(England) Charles Hope (a)	78-81=159
T10	(England) Josh Taylor	78-81=159
T10	(Jersey) Harry Vardon	78-81=159

=== Third round ===
Thursday, 1 July 1920 (morning)

Place	Player	Score
1	(England) Len Holland	80-78-71=229
T2	(England) Jim Barnes	79-74-77=230
T2	(Scotland) Sandy Herd	72-81-77=230
T4	(Scotland) George Duncan	80-80-71=231
T4	(England) Abe Mitchell	74-73-84=231
T4	(England) Syd Wingate	81-74-76=231
7	(Jersey) Ted Ray	72-83-78=233
8	(England) William Horne	80-81-73=234
T9	(England) George Buckle	80-80-77=237
T9	(England) Archie Compston	79-83-75=237

=== Final round ===
Thursday, 1 July 1920 (afternoon)

Place	Player	Score	Money (£)
1	(Scotland) George Duncan	80-80-71-72=303	75
2	(Scotland) Sandy Herd	72-81-77-75=305	40
3	(Jersey) Ted Ray	72-83-78-73=306	25
4	(England) Abe Mitchell	74-73-84-76=307	15
5	(England) Len Holland	80-78-71-79=308	10
6	(England) Jim Barnes	79-74-77-79=309	10
T7	(England) Arthur Havers	80-78-81-74=313	7; 10s
T7	(England) Syd Wingate	81-74-76-82=313	7; 10s
T9	(England) George Buckle	80-80-77-78=315	3; 6s 8d
T9	(England) Archie Compston	79-83-75-78=315	3; 6s 8d
T9	(England) William Horne	80-81-73-81=315	3; 6s 8d

Amateurs: Hunter (322), Grant (324), Harris (325), Hope (326),
Tolley (326), Armour (329), Scott (331), Bretherton (335).
