= Reg Wilson (golfer) =

English golfer

Personal information
- Full name: Reginald George Wilson
- Nationality: England
- Born: 1888 Bushey, Hertfordshire, England
- Died: 1959 (aged 71) England

Career
- Sport: Golf
- Turned professional: 1904
- Professional wins: 1

Best results in major championships
- Masters Tournament: DNP
- PGA Championship: DNP
- U.S. Open: DNP
- The Open Championship: 6th: 1914

Reginald George Wilson (1888–1959) was an English professional golfer. He had some success both before and after World War I.

Wilson twice finished in the top-10 in the Open Championship, finishing tied for 7th place in 1912 and in 6th place in 1914. He played for England against Scotland in 1913, winning both his matches.

Wilson enjoyed considerable success in the News of the World Match Play. He reached the semi-final stage in both 1912 and 1913. In 1912 he lost 7&5 to Harry Vardon, while in 1913 he lost 4&3 to George Duncan. Wilson won the tournament in 1923 at Walton Heath Golf Club beating Thomas Renouf 4&2 in the final and winning the first prize of £200. He reached the semi-final for the fourth time in 1926, losing to 58-year-old Sandy Herd by 1 hole.

Wilson was originally at Berkhamsted Golf Club but moved to Croham Hurst Golf Club in 1913 where he stayed until at least 1939.

His son Reginald William George Wilson (1908–1993) was also a professional golfer and played in the 1929 and 1933 Open Championships.

== Professional wins ==
- 1923 News of the World Match Play

== Results in major championships ==
Tournament	1906	1907	1908	1909	1910	1911	1912	1913	1914	1915	1916	1917	1918	1919
The Open Championship	CUT		T46		CUT		T7	T34	6	NT	NT	NT	NT	NT

Tournament	1920	1921	1922	1923	1924	1925	1926	1927	1928
The Open Championship	T21	T41	T36	T29		T48		CUT	T23

Note: Wilson only played in The Open Championship.

Top 10
Did not play

NT = No tournament
CUT = missed the half-way cut
"T" indicates a tie for a place

== Team appearances ==
- England–Scotland Professional Match (representing England): 1913 (winners)
