= England–Scotland Professional Match =

Tournament information
- Established: 1903
- Format: Team match play
- Month played: June/July
- Final year: 1938

Final champion
- England

The England–Scotland Professional Match was an annual men's professional golf competition between teams representing England and Scotland. It was played from 1903 to the start of World War I and was then revived in 1932 and played until the start of World War II. The match was played on a single day, generally a few days before the Open Championship. Except on one occasion, there were 12 players in each team who played 12 singles matches and 6 foursomes. Scotland won the inaugural match in 1903 but didn't win another match, although three matches were tied. The event was organised by the PGA and only members of the PGA were eligible to play.

== History ==
In 1902 an international match between English and Scottish amateur golfers was played at Royal Liverpool Golf Club prior to the Amateur Championship there. The match consisted of 10 singles matches played over 36 holes. The following year the Professional Golfers' Association decided to organise a similar match for professionals at Prestwick, before the 1903 Open Championship. It was originally planned to play 36-hole singles but it was later decided to play both singles and foursomes. Because only members of the PGA were eligible to play, a number of Scottish golfers were not available for selection, including William Auchterlonie, Andrew Kirkaldy and Archie Simpson. Tom Williamson was originally selected for the England team but was replaced by Fred Collins.

The 1908 match was abandoned because of bad weather. The England team was: Tom Ball, George Cawsey, Phil Gaudin, Ernest Gray, Rowland Jones, Charles Mayo, Ted Ray, James Sherlock, J.H. Taylor, Harry Vardon, Tom Vardon, Tom Williamson. The Scottish team was: James Braid, George Duncan, James Hepburn, Sandy Herd, John Hunter, Andrew Kirkaldy, Ben Sayers, Ben Sayers, Jr., Ralph Smith, Tom Watt, Robert Thomson, Jack White.

In 1909 there was a dispute about which team Fred Robson would represent. He was born in Wales but apparently had a Scottish father and English mother and was initially selected for both sides. Having learnt his golf in England he eventually chose to represent that country. A meeting of the PGA on the following Monday accepted the principle that the player could choose in such situations. However this account is contradicted by evidence from the 1891 census of Wales which records that his father was born in Birmingham and mother in Holywell, Wales.

There was no match in 1911 because a "Coronation Match" had been organised between teams of amateurs and professionals on the Saturday before the Open Championship, 24 June. The match was in celebration of the coronation of George V on 22 June. The match consisted of 9 foursomes matches, each over 36 holes and resulted in an 8–1 win for the professionals.

The PGA decided that the 1914 match would not be played at the same time as the Open Championship. The proprietors of Country Life agreed to provide a cup. It was planned to play the 1914 match at Royal Mid-Surrey Golf Club on 22 October. Even after the outbreak of World War I it was decided to still hold the event and to raise money for the Prince of Wales' War Fund but the match was eventually cancelled. A charity match was played at Fulwell Golf Course on 12 December 1914 between English and Scottish members of the Southern section of the PGA in aid of Princess Mary's Christmas Gifts Fund for soldiers and sailors. The match followed the same format as the full international. The English players won by 8 matches to 6 with 4 matches halved.

England won all 7 matches played from 1932 to 1938. The closest match was in 1937 when Scotland led 4–0 after the foursomes but England won 9 of the 12 singles to win 9–7. England and Scotland played two matches in 1938 since they also met in the Llandudno International Golf Trophy in September. Henry Cotton was selected for the England team in 1932 but declined the invitation and was replaced by George Oke. Cotton never played in any of the matches.

The 1939 match was cancelled because of the expense and difficulty of collecting the entrance charges on the Old Course at St Andrews. The PGA has already received permission from the Town Council to charge for entry.

== Format ==
Except in 1907 the teams had 12 players. There were 12 singles matches and 6 foursomes. Matches were over 18 holes. In the earlier period the singles were played in the morning and the foursomes in the afternoon but when the event was revived in 1932 the order was reversed. In 1907 there were 16 in each team who each played a 36-hole singles match. The result was decided by the number of matches won, halved matches were not included in the final score. In the matches before World War I the players went out in ranking order with the best players going out first. The same principle was applied to the foursomes with the two best players on each team playing each other in the first foursomes. Generally the same players contested the singles and the foursomes. However, in 1932 Sandy Herd and Peter Robertson played in the foursomes but were replaced by the reserves, Jock Ballantine and Jimmy Adams in the singles. In 1933 Robertson again missed the singles and Jack McMillan played instead.

== Results ==
Year	Date	Venue	Winners	Score	Ref
1903	8 June	Prestwick	Scotland	9–8	
1904	4 June	Royal St George's	Tie	8–8	
1905	3 June	St Andrews	Tie	7–7	
1906	11 June	Muirfield	England	12–6	
1907	15 June	Royal Liverpool	England	8–5	
1908	13 June	Prestwick	Abandoned		
1909	5 June	Royal Cinque Ports	England	11–4	
1910	18 June	St Andrews	England	11–5	
1911	24 June	Royal St George's	Coronation Match		
1912	18 June	Muirfield	Tie	8–8	
1913	17 June	Royal Liverpool	England	13–4	
1914	22 October	Royal Mid-Surrey	Cancelled		
1915–1931: Not held
1932	4 June	Prince's	England	13–3	
1933	1 July	Barnton, Edinburgh	England	10–5	
1934	23 June	Royal St George's	England	11–3	
1935	22 June	Muirfield	England	13–4	
1936	20 June	Royal Liverpool	England	13–4	
1937	3 July	Carnoustie	England	9–7	
1938	2 July	Royal St George's	England	10–6	
1939	1 July	St Andrews	Cancelled		

== Appearances ==
The following are those who played in at least one of the 16 matches. Laurie Ayton, Snr, George Duncan, Tom Fernie and Sandy Herd played for Scotland in both the earlier period (1903–1913) and the later matches (1932–1938). No Englishman played in both periods.

=== England ===
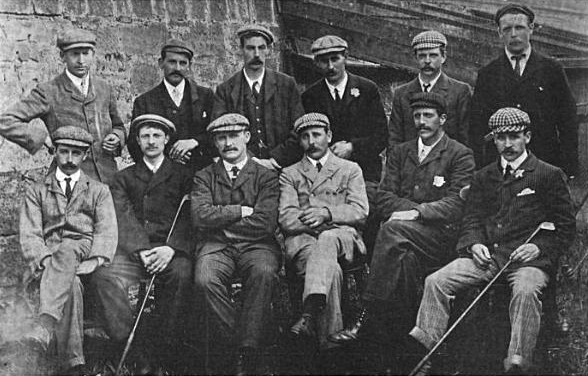
A group photo of the 1903 England team Standing: Sherlock, Collins, Rowe, Harry Vardon, Jones, Rainford Seated: Walter Toogood, Renouf, Taylor, Tom Vardon, Ray, Tingey

==== 1903–1913 ====
- Tom Ball 1909, 1910, 1912, 1913
- James Batley 1912
- George Cawsey 1906, 1907
- Fred Collins 1903, 1904
- Phil Gaudin 1905, 1906, 1907, 1909, 1912, 1913
- Ernest Gray 1904, 1905, 1907
- Rowland Jones 1903, 1904, 1905, 1906, 1907, 1909, 1910, 1912, 1913
- Charles Mayo 1907, 1909, 1910, 1912, 1913
- George Pulford 1904, 1907
- Peter Rainford 1903
- Ted Ray 1903, 1904, 1905, 1906, 1907, 1909, 1910, 1912, 1913
- Wilfrid Reid 1906, 1907, 1909, 1910, 1912, 1913
- Thomas Renouf 1903, 1904, 1905, 1910, 1912
- Fred Robson 1909, 1910
- Jack Rowe 1903, 1906, 1907
- James Sherlock 1903, 1904, 1905, 1906, 1907, 1909, 1910, 1912, 1913
- J.H. Taylor 1903, 1904, 1905, 1906, 1907, 1909, 1910, 1912, 1913
- Josh Taylor 1913
- Albert Tingey, Sr. 1903, 1905
- Alfred Toogood 1904, 1905, 1906, 1907
- Walter Toogood 1903, 1907
- Harry Vardon 1903, 1904, 1905, 1906, 1907, 1909, 1910, 1912, 1913
- Tom Vardon 1903, 1904, 1905, 1906, 1907, 1909, 1910
- Tom Williamson 1904, 1905, 1906, 1907, 1909, 1910, 1912, 1913
- Reg Wilson 1913

==== 1932–1938 ====
- Percy Alliss 1932, 1933, 1934, 1935, 1936, 1937
- Bill Branch 1936
- Sid Brews 1934
- Dick Burton 1935, 1936, 1937, 1938
- Harry Busson 1938
- Jack Busson 1934, 1935, 1936, 1937
- Tom Collinge 1937
- Archie Compston 1932, 1935
- Bill Cox 1935, 1936, 1937
- Don Curtis 1934, 1938
- Bill Davies 1932, 1933
- Cecil Denny 1936
- Syd Easterbrook 1932, 1933, 1934, 1935, 1938
- Bert Gadd 1933, 1935
- Tom Green 1935
- Arthur Havers 1932, 1933, 1934
- Ted Jarman 1935
- Bob Kenyon 1932
- Sam King 1934, 1936, 1937, 1938
- Arthur Lacey 1932, 1933, 1934, 1936, 1937, 1938
- Arthur Lees 1938
- Abe Mitchell 1932, 1933, 1934
- George Oke 1932, 1937
- Alf Padgham 1932, 1933, 1934, 1935, 1936, 1937, 1938
- Alf Perry 1933, 1936, 1938
- Mark Seymour 1932, 1933
- Jack Taylor 1937
- Charles Whitcombe 1932, 1933, 1934, 1935, 1936, 1937, 1938
- Eddie Whitcombe 1938
- Reg Whitcombe 1933, 1934, 1935, 1936, 1937, 1938

=== Scotland ===
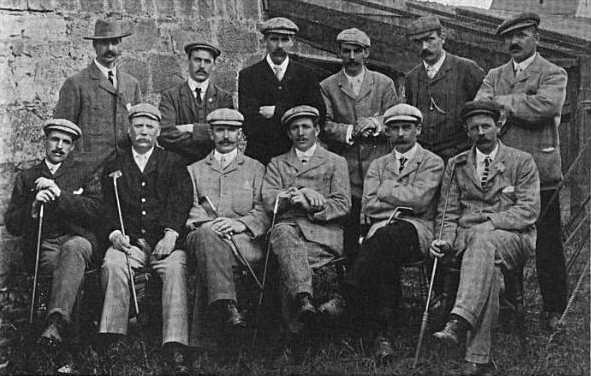
A group photo of the 1903 Scotland team Standing: Smith, Coburn, Braid, Thomson, Park, Fernie Seated: Kinnell, Kay, Herd, White, Sayers, Hepburn

==== 1903–1913 ====
- Laurie Ayton, Snr 1910, 1912, 1913
- James Braid 1903, 1904, 1905, 1906, 1907, 1909, 1910, 1912
- George Coburn 1903, 1904, 1905, 1907
- Frank Coltart 1909
- George Duncan 1906, 1907, 1909, 1910, 1912, 1913
- Tom Fernie 1910, 1912, 1913
- Willie Fernie 1903, 1904
- Allan Gow 1912
- Tom Grant 1913
- James Hepburn 1903, 1905, 1906, 1907, 1910, 1912, 1913
- Sandy Herd 1903, 1904, 1905, 1906, 1907, 1909, 1910, 1912, 1913
- Willie Hunter, Sr. 1906, 1907, 1909, 1910
- James Kay 1903
- James Kinnell 1903, 1904, 1905, 1906, 1907, 1910, 1912
- Andrew Kirkaldy 1904, 1905, 1907, 1909, 1910
- Jack Kirkaldy 1905, 1906
- Peter McEwan Jr. 1907
- Alex Marling 1913
- Jack Park 1909
- Willie Park, Jr. 1903, 1904, 1905, 1907, 1910
- Willie Ritchie 1913
- Ben Sayers 1903, 1904, 1905, 1906, 1907, 1909, 1910, 1912, 1913
- Ben Sayers, Jr. 1906, 1907, 1909
- Archie Simpson 1904
- Ralph Smith 1903, 1904, 1907, 1909, 1913
- Robert Thomson 1903, 1904, 1905, 1906, 1907, 1909, 1910, 1912
- Tom Watt 1907
- Willie Watt 1912, 1913
- Jack White 1903, 1904, 1905, 1906, 1907, 1909, 1912, 1913
- Tom Yeoman 1905, 1906

==== 1932–1938 ====
- Jimmy Adams 1932, 1933, 1934, 1935, 1936, 1937, 1938
- Willam Anderson 1937
- Laurie Ayton, Jnr 1937
- Laurie Ayton, Snr 1933, 1934
- Jock Ballantine 1932, 1936
- Hamish Ballingall 1938
- Stewart Burns 1932
- Allan Dailey 1932, 1933, 1934, 1935, 1936, 1938
- William Davis 1937, 1938
- Tom Dobson 1932, 1933, 1934, 1935, 1936, 1937
- John Donaldson 1932, 1935, 1938
- George Duncan 1932, 1934, 1935, 1936, 1937
- Gordon Durward 1937
- Sydney Fairweather 1933, 1935, 1936
- John Fallon 1936, 1937, 1938
- Walter Fenton 1932
- Tom Fernie 1933
- Jim Forrester 1932, 1933, 1934, 1935, 1936
- Gordon Good 1934, 1936
- Tom Haliburton 1938
- Willie Hastings 1937, 1938
- Sandy Herd 1932
- George Hutton 1937, 1938
- George Knight 1937
- Bill Laidlaw 1935, 1936, 1938
- Duncan McCulloch 1932, 1933, 1934, 1935, 1936, 1937
- Jimmy McDowall 1932, 1933, 1934, 1935, 1936
- Gregor McIntosh 1938
- Jack McMillan 1933, 1934, 1935
- Willie McMinn 1932, 1933, 1934
- Fred Robertson 1938
- Peter Robertson 1932, 1933
- Willie Spark 1935
- Tom Wilson 1933, 1934
