= Bishop's Stortford Tournament =

Tournament information
- Location: Bishop's Stortford, Hertfordshire, England
- Established: 1914
- Course(s): Bishop's Stortford Golf Club
- Month played: May
- Final year: 1914

Final champion
- George Duncan

Location in England

The Bishop's Stortford Tournament was a professional golf tournament played at Bishop's Stortford Golf Club, Hertfordshire in 1914. The tournament was won by George Duncan.

== History ==
Bishop's Stortford golf club had opened in 1910. In 1914 the club organised a professional tournament with total prize money of £120. The tournament took place on 6 May and was a 36-hole stroke play contest. The tournament attracted an exceptionally strong field of about 60, with all the leading professionals playing. The winner received £40, with £20 for second place, £15 for third, £10 for fourth and 5 further prizes of £5. The leading scorer in each round also received £5.

The tournament was won by George Duncan with rounds of 72 and 69, two shots ahead of Harry Vardon who had rounds of 72 and 71. The remaining prize-winners were Ted Ray, James Braid, Abe Mitchell, Jack B. Ross, James Douglas Edgar, John Milne, Sandy Herd, Anthony Kettley, Charles Mayo and J.H. Taylor. Duncan, Vardon, Mitchell and Milne shared the prize for the best first round while Duncan took the £5 for his second round 69.

== Winners ==
Year	Winners	Country	Score	Margin of victory	Runner-up	Winner's share (£)	Ref
1914	George Duncan	Scotland	141	2 strokes	(Jersey) Harry Vardon	40	
