= London Professional Foursomes Tournament =

London Professional Foursomes
Tournament information
- Location: England
- Established: 1907
- Final year: 1911

Final champion
- Tom Ball and Fred Robson

The London Professional Foursomes Tournament was a professional golf tournament played annually from 1907 to 1911. In 1909 the southern section of the PGA took over the organisation of the event which was called the Southern Professional Foursomes Tournament. The winners received the "Dewar Shields" donated by Sir Thomas Dewar.

The Sphere and Tatler Foursomes Tournament started in 1911 and the Southern Professional Foursomes was not played again.

== History ==
=== 1907 ===
In late 1906 Sir Thomas Dewar presented a 50-guinea challenge cup for a London Professional Foursomes Tournament. The tournament was a knock-out event. In the early rounds the first named couple in the draw had the choice of course. The semi-finals and final were to be played at a neutral venue. Each round had to be completed by a specific date with the final to be completed by the end of February 1907. Matches were over 36 holes with a sudden-death playoff in the event of a tie. Initially 7 first-round matches were played but, through some oversight, this only reduced the number of pairs to 18 and two further first-round matches were needed to reduce the number of pairs from the initial 25 to 16. The final was between Rowland Jones/Alfred Toogood and Ralph Smith/Albert Tingey, Sr. and was arranged for 27 February. However, Jones had arranged to play in Grand Duke Michael's Tournament in Cannes on 26 and 27 February and so could not play on the pre-arranged date. It was suggested that the final be postponed but it was argued that Jones should not have entered unless he was available and so Smith and Tingey claimed the final. A fill-in match involving Smith and Tingey was arranged. The chief prizes were a pair of shields to be held for one year and gold medals presented by Mr F A Johnson.

In late August a 108-hole match was arranged on the Isle of Wight between the finalists. 36 holes were played on three successive days on three different courses, at St Helens, the Needles and Sandown. Jones and Toogood, both of whom were from the Isle of Wight, won comfortably 12&10.

The interest in the London Professional Foursomes led to running of a Midland Professional Foursomes tournament using a similar format.

=== 1908 ===
The format was revised for 1908 with each round being played on the same day on a specific course. 13 matches were played at Banstead Downs on 3 March which reduced the field from 29 to 16 pairs. The final was arranged for 6 April at Walton Heath and was to be between George Duncan/Charles Mayo and Ben Sayers, Jr./Jack White. Unfortunately Jack White was ill and, a postponement not being allowed, the final was awarded to George Duncan and Charles Mayo.

=== 1909 ===
In early 1909 the southern section of the PGA took over the management of the event from Mr Johnson. Entry was restricted to southern section members. The first four rounds were played at Bushey Hall on 6 and 7 April, matches being reduced to 18 holes. 27 pairs played. The 36-hole final was played at Walton Heath on 26 May and resulted in a convincing win for James Batley and William Horne.

=== 1910 ===
The 1910 event was planned for 26 to 28 January at Stoke Poges with four 18-hole rounds on the first two days followed by a 36-hole final. 26 pairs played. The ground was very frosty for the first two days and then there was snow followed by a rapid thaw which left the course waterlogged and the final had to be postponed. The final was rearranged for 8 February and was won by the Taylor brothers, J.H. and Josh.

=== 1911 ===
The 1911 event was played from 14 to 16 March at Fulwell. As in 1910 there were four 18-hole rounds on the first two days followed by a 36-hole final. 29 pairs played. The final was won by Tom Ball and Fred Robson.

== Winners ==
Year	Winners	Country	Venue	Margin of victory	Runners-up	Winner's share (£)	Ref
London Professional Foursomes Tournament
1907	Ralph Smith & Albert Tingey, Sr.	England; England	Bramshot Golf Club	Walk-over	(England) Rowland Jones & (England) Alfred Toogood		
1908	George Duncan & Charles Mayo	Scotland; England	Walton Heath Golf Club	Walk-over	(Scotland) Ben Sayers, Jr. & (Scotland) Jack White		
Southern Professional Foursomes Tournament
1909	James Batley & William Horne	England; England	Walton Heath Golf Club	11 & 10	(England) James Bradbeer & (England) George Charles		
1910	J.H. Taylor & Josh Taylor	England; England	Stoke Poges Golf Club	6 & 5	(England) James Bradbeer & (England) George Charles		
1911	Tom Ball & Fred Robson	England; England	Fulwell Golf Club	3 & 2	(England) Charles Johns & (England) Anthony Kettley		
