= 1914 Open Championship =

Coordinates: 55.502°N 4.619°W

Tournament information
- Dates: 18–19 June 1914
- Location: Prestwick, South Ayrshire, Scotland
- Course: Prestwick Golf Club

Statistics
- Length: 6,526 yards (5,967 m)
- Field: 100 players
- Cut: none
- Prize fund: £125
- Winner's share: £50

Champion
- (Jersey) Harry Vardon
- 306

Location in Scotland
Location in South Ayrshire, Scotland

The 1914 Open Championship was the 54th Open Championship, held 18–19 June at Prestwick Golf Club in Prestwick, South Ayrshire, Scotland. Harry Vardon won a record sixth Open Championship title, three strokes ahead of runner-up J.H. Taylor, the defending champion. Entering the championship, Vardon, Taylor, and James Braid had five Open wins each. This was the sixteenth and final Open title for these three, the Great Triumvirate. Due to World War I, it was the last Open for six years; the next was in 1920.

Qualification took place the week before on 11−12 June at Troon, with 18 holes on the Old Course and 18 holes on Troon municipal number 2, and exactly 100 players qualified. Taylor and Ted Ray, winners of the last two Opens, led the field on 150 and 96 players at 163 or better advanced. The thirteen at 164 played an additional 18 holes at Prestwick the next day to determine the final four places; scores of 79 and better qualified.

After the first two rounds on Thursday, Vardon led at 150, by one shot ahead of a relatively unknown James Ockenden from West Drayton Golf Club. Taylor was a shot back in third at 152. One shot back after an opening 74, Braid's 82 in the afternoon dropped him into a tie for ninth.

Vardon and Taylor were paired together on Friday and, after Ockenden had a disappointing 83, they were clear leaders after the morning's third round. Taylor led on 226 with Vardon two back; amateur James Jenkins was third on 232 and three were tied at 233.

With the two leaders playing together, huge crowds followed in the final round that afternoon. Taylor extended his lead to three at the first hole, but at the third, he was distracted by a photographer and dropped a stroke to Vardon. The championship was largely decided at the fourth hole, where Taylor found the water and took seven to Vardon's four, which changed the lead. Taylor dropped more strokes to Vardon at the 5th, 8th, 10th, and 11th holes and Vardon led by five. Taylor recovered somewhat and shot 83, but Vardon won by three shots at 78 for 306. Phil Gaudin had the best score in the final round at 74.

This was the penultimate Open at Prestwick, which hosted 24, including the first twelve; the last was eleven years later in 1925. It was replaced by adjacent Troon Golf Club ("Royal Troon" since 1978) as the Open venue for southwestern Scotland. Turnberry was added to the rota in 1977, southwest of Prestwick.

== Course ==
Hole	1	2	3	4	5	6	7	8	9	Out	10	11	12	13	14	15	16	17	18	In	Total
Yards	330	118	492	377	196	435	287	328	403	3,056	479	383	503	432	400	325	286	383	279	3,470	6,526

== Round summaries ==
=== First round ===
Thursday, 18 June 1914 (morning)

Place	Player	Score
1	(Jersey) Harry Vardon	73
T2	(Scotland) James Braid	74
T2	(England) J.H. Taylor	74
T2	(England) Ernest Whitcombe	74
T5	(England) James Ockenden	75
T5	(England) Tom Williamson	75
T7	(France) Jean Gassiat	76
T7	(England) Fred Leach	76
T7	(England) Abe Mitchell	76
T7	(England) Reg Wilson	76

=== Second round ===
Thursday, 18 June 1914 (afternoon)

Place	Player	Score
1	(Jersey) Harry Vardon	73-77=150
2	(England) James Ockenden	75-76=151
3	(England) J.H. Taylor	74-78=152
4	(England) Reg Wilson	76-77=153
T5	(England) James Edgar	79-75=154
T5	(England) Walter Hambleton	79-75=154
T5	(England) Abe Mitchell	76-78=154
T5	(England) Tom Williamson	75-79=154
T9	(Scotland) James Braid	74-82=156
T9	(Scotland) George Duncan	77-79=156
T9	(England) Len Holland	78-78=156
T9	(Scotland) Cecil Hutchison (a)	81-75=156

=== Third round ===
Friday, 19 June 1914 (morning)

Place	Player	Score
1	(England) J.H. Taylor	74-78-74=226
2	(Jersey) Harry Vardon	73-77-78=228
3	(Scotland) James Jenkins (a)	79-80-73=232
T4	(England) Abe Mitchell	76-78-79=233
T4	(England) Tom Williamson	75-79-79=233
T4	(England) Reg Wilson	76-77-80=233
T7	(Scotland) James Braid	74-82-78=234
T7	(France) Arnaud Massy	77-82-75=234
T7	(England) James Ockenden	75-76-83=234
T10	(Jersey) Ted Ray	77-82-76=235
T10	(England) Harry Simpson	77-80-78=235

=== Final round ===
Friday, 19 June 1914 (afternoon)

Place	Player	Score	Money (£)
1	(Jersey) Harry Vardon	73-77-78-78=306	50
2	(England) J.H. Taylor	74-78-74-83=309	25
3	(England) Harry Simpson	77-80-78-75=310	15
T4	(England) Abe Mitchell	76-78-79-79=312	8 15s
T4	(England) Tom Williamson	75-79-79-79=312	8 15s
6	(England) Reg Wilson	76-77-80-80=313	7 10s
7	(England) James Ockenden	75-76-83-80=314	5
T8	(Jersey) Phil Gaudin	78-83-80-74=315	5
T8	(Scotland) James Jenkins (a)	79-80-73-83=315	0
T10	(Scotland) James Braid	74-82-78-82=316	0
T10	(Scotland) George Duncan	77-79-80-80=316	0
T10	(France) Arnaud Massy	77-82-75-82=316	0
T10	(Jersey) Ted Ray	77-82-76-81=316	0

Amateurs: Jenkins (315), Lassen (319), Hutchison (324), Lockhart (326),
Anderson (329), Ouimet (332), Hope (335), Shepherd (338).

==== Scorecards ====
Final round

Hole	1	2	3	4	5	6	7	8	9	Out	10	11	12	13	14	15	16	17	18	Back	Total
(Jersey) Vardon	6	4	4	4	4	4	4	4	5	39	4	4	5	5	4	4	5	4	4	39	78
(England) Taylor	5	4	5	7	5	4	4	5	5	44	5	5	5	4	4	5	3	4	4	39	83
Leader-strokes	T3	T3	T2	V1	V2	V2	V2	V3	V3		V4	V5	V5	V4	V4	V5	V3	V3	V3		
