= Charles Mayo (golfer) =

English professional golfer (1884–1977)

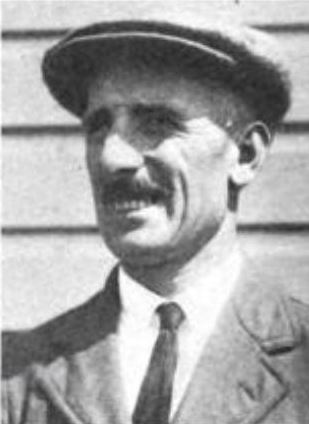
- Mayo, c. 1931

Personal information
- Full name: Charles Henry Mayo
- Nationality: England
- Born: 30 November 1884 Dudley, England
- Died: July 1977 (aged 92) River Edge, New Jersey
- Spouse: Rosetta E. Mayo
- Children: 2

Career
- Sport: Golf
- Turned professional: c. 1900
- Professional wins: 2

Best results in major championships
- Masters Tournament: DNP
- PGA Championship: T9: 1920
- U.S. Open: 26th: 1925
- The Open Championship: T11: 1912

Charles Henry Mayo (30 November 1884 – July 1977) was an English professional golfer of the early 20th century. Mayo won the 1911 Belgian Open held at the Royal Golf Club of Belgium. Frenchman Arnaud Massy finished in second place. He had seven starts in the Open Championship, his best finish being T11 in 1912. He finished runner-up in the 1908 French Open and had five international appearances representing England against Scotland.

== Early life ==
Mayo was born in Dudley, England, on 30 November 1884, the son of Isaac Mayo. He started playing golf at age 8, playing in the streets of Gospel End where he grew up with a home-made club made of a block of wood with a small tree branch stuck in a burned out hole.

Mayo's two brothers, Albert (1886–1973) and Walter (1894–1916), were both professional golfers. Walter was killed in France during World War I.

== Early golf career ==
Mayo was professional at Broadway Golf Club in about 1902 and then at Bridgnorth where he was in early 1905 but soon thereafter became the first professional at Chipstead Golf Club which opened in September 1906. Even before the opening of the course he had moved to Chipstead and competed in the southern section qualifying for the News of the World Matchplay, where he finished 5th, qualifying comfortably with 16 places available. He also competed in a tournament at Radyr Golf Club which served as the Welsh section qualifying event, but which was open to all PGA members. He won the event with a score of 152. Later he finished joint runner-up in an open competition at Sandwell Park. In the finals of the News of the World Matchplay, Mayo won four matches to reach the final against Sandy Herd, losing 8 and 7 in the 36-hole final. Mayo won £30 and a silver medal. Mayo was described as "a plucky and painstaking young player" as well as "deliberate but steady".

Mayo's success during the summer of 1906 made him more widely known and soon after the News of the World Matchplay, he and George Duncan challenged any two professionals to a foursome over 72 holes for £50 each side, with their £50 being provided by World of Golf. The challenge was accepted by James Braid and Harry Vardon. The first 36 holes were played at Walton Heath and finished with Braid and Vardon being 4 up. The remaining 36 holes were played at Timperley. Braid and Vardon continued their good form and won easily 9 and 8. In early 1907 Mayo played Allan Gow, the professional at Gog Magog, to a 72-hole match for £40. the first 36 holes were played at Bridgnorth and Mayo finished the day 12 holes up. The final day was played at the Royal West Norfolk Club at Brancaster with Mayo ending up the winner by the overwhelming score of 14 and 13. Immediately after this match Mayo resigned from the Chipstead Club, despite having served just 8 months of a 5-year contract, and took up a position at the newly opened Burhill Golf Club, Walton-on-Thames. In 1908, Mayo was paired with George Duncan and won a challenge match against Harry Vardon and Ted Ray.

Mayo was demobilised in 1919 and returned to Burhill after serving in the Royal Air Force (RAF) during World War I. After the war he quickly regained good playing form and was entered in the St Annes Old Links Tournament where he was joint leader after the first day but faded on the second day to finish joint 5th, three strokes behind J.H. Taylor.

=== Walter Mayo ===
Mayo's younger brother, Walter, was Charles's assistant at Burhill from 1911 to 1914, although he spent the summer of 1912 as professional at Baden-Baden. During his period at Baden-Baden he played in the 1912 German Open, an event in which Charles set a new course record. Walter played in the southern section qualifying for the 1913 News of the World Matchplay at Burhill but finished 11 strokes behind the qualifying places. He played in the southern section qualifying for the 1914 Sphere and Tatler Foursomes Tournament at Old Fold Manor and finished 5th, a stroke ahead of Charles, and qualified comfortably. Walter won £2 2s for his second round 74, the best by an assistant professional. The best of the day by a full professional was just one shot better. In the finals he was paired with Reginald Gray but they lost in the first round at the 19th hole. Walter served in the Rifle Brigade and was killed in the First World War in France on 15 November 1916.

== Later golf career ==
On 20 April 1920, Mayo and his wife along with their two children – daughter Ivy and son Charles, Jr. – departed Liverpool aboard the SS Vasari and arrived in New York on 4 May 1920. The family left New York and travelled to Illinois where Mayo's father Isaac was already living. Soon after arrival in the U.S., Mayo acquired some work in designing the Hacienda Golf Club in La Habra Heights, California, and is credited with the design of the course's back nine holes. Later in 1920 Mayo took a job as head professional at Edgewater Golf Club in Chicago, Illinois, where he and Chick Evans lost a match to the touring British duo of George Duncan and Abe Mitchell on 26 July 1921. He subsequently accepted a position as head professional at Druid Hills Golf Club near Atlanta in December 1921. He replaced the late J. Douglas Edgar who had been murdered on an Atlanta street. Mayo's appointment at Druid Hills was short-lived since he gave up the post and had returned to the United Kingdom in time to play in the Glasgow Herald Tournament in early June 1922. Mayo reached the last-16, winning £17 10s. In October he qualified for the final stages of the News of the World Matchplay, losing in the last-32 round. In early 1923 he returned to the United States to take up an appointment at Westhampton Country Club on Long Island, New York.

=== Golf course designs ===
In addition to designing the back nine holes at Hacienda Golf Club in California, Mayo is credited with designing the first nine holes of Blackhawk Country Club near Lake Mendota in Wisconsin and his brother Albert became its first professional in 1921.

== Later life, retirement, and death ==
In 1940 Mayo and his wife Rosetta were living in Hempstead, New York, where he was the superintendent of Lido Golf Club. Mayo retired from Hackensack Country Club (New Jersey) in 1958 where he had been professional since 1944. Mayo died in July 1977 at River Edge, New Jersey. He was made a life member of the British PGA in 1955.

== Tournaments ==
=== Belgian Open ===
In addition to winning the 1911 Belgian Open, Mayo also competed in the 1914 Belgian Open, held at the Royal Antwerp Golf Club, and finished in second place behind Tom Ball.

=== 1920 PGA Championship ===
Mayo competed in the 1920 PGA Championship and started out in round one of the match play tournament by defeating Lloyd Gullickson 2 and 1. In round two he lost to Louis Tellier by the score of 4 and 3. His T9 finish in the tournament was his best in a major championship.

== Tournament wins ==
Note: This list may be incomplete

- 1908 London Professional Foursomes Tournament (with George Duncan)
- 1911 Belgian Open

== Results in major championships ==
Tournament	1907	1908	1909	1910	1911	1912	1913	1914	1915	1916	1917	1918	1919	1920	1921	1922	1923	1924	1925	1926
U.S. Open	DNP	DNP	DNP	DNP	DNP	DNP	DNP	DNP	DNP	DNP	NT	NT	DNP	T56	?	?	?	?	26	T47
The Open Championship	T17	T30	T42	44	T16	T11	T27	DNP	NT	NT	NT	NT	NT	DNP	DNP	DNP	DNP	DNP	DNP	DNP
PGA Championship	NYF	NYF	NYF	NYF	NYF	NYF	NYF	NYF	NYF	DNP	NT	NT	DNP	R16	DNP	DNP	DNP	DNP	DNP	DNP

Note: Mayo never played in the Masters Tournament.

NYF = Tournament not yet founded
NT = No tournament
DNP = Did not play
? = unknown
R64, R32, R16, QF, SF = Round in which player lost in PGA Championship match play
"T" indicates a tie for a place
Yellow background for top-10

== Team appearances ==
- England–Scotland Professional Match (representing England): 1907 (winners), 1909 (winners), 1910 (winners), 1912 (tie), 1913 (winners)
- Coronation Match (representing the Professionals): 1911 (winners)
