= James Batley =

English professional golfer (1876–1964)

Personal information
- Full name: James Benjamin Batley
- Nationality: England
- Born: 1876 Bethnal Green, London, England
- Died: 1964 (aged 87) England

Career
- Sport: Golf
- Status: Professional
- Professional wins: 2

Best results in major championships
- Masters Tournament: DNP
- PGA Championship: DNP
- U.S. Open: DNP
- The Open Championship: T21: 1914

James Benjamin Batley (1876–1964) was an English professional golfer. His main successes came in foursomes events, winning the 1909 London Professional Foursomes Tournament and the 1914 Sphere and Tatler Foursomes Tournament. He played for England in the 1912 England–Scotland Professional Match.

== Golf career ==
In 1909 Batley won the London Professional Foursomes Tournament, playing with William Horne. The 36-hole final against James Bradbeer and George Charles was played at Walton Heath Golf Club on 26 May and resulted in a convincing win for Batley and Horne by a score of 11&10.

He was runner-up in the 1913 Tooting Bec Cup. He had finished joint leader in the southern section qualifying competition for the Sphere and Tatler Foursomes Tournament with Harry Vardon, played at Fulwell Golf Club. Rowland Jones and Ted Ray had similarly been joint leaders at Denham Golf Club, where the remaining half of the section played. A playoff between the four players would determine the winner of the Tooting Bec Cup. The playoff did not take place for nearly a year, being played on 14 April 1914 at Thorpe Hall Golf Club. 18 holes were played and resulted in another tie. Batley and Ray scoring 74, with Jones on 77 and Vardon on 78. There was then a further playoff on 20 April 1914 at Old Fold Manor Golf Club. Again 18 holes were played, Ray winning with a score of 74 to Batley's 76.

In 1914 he won the Sphere and Tatler Foursomes Tournament in partnership with Len Holland, beating the Scottish pair of C McIntosh and George Smith 5&4 in the final.

Batley was Chairman of the PGA in 1928–29 and was a selector for the 1929 Ryder Cup team.

== Professional wins ==
- 1909 London Professional Foursomes Tournament (with William Horne)
- 1914 Sphere and Tatler Foursomes Tournament (with Len Holland)

== Results in major championships ==
Tournament	1899
The Open Championship	WD

Tournament	1900	1901	1902	1903	1904	1905	1906	1907	1908	1909
The Open Championship		CUT		T50	WD	T31	CUT			T31

Tournament	1910	1911	1912	1913	1914	1915	1916	1917	1918	1919
The Open Championship	?	CUT	T27		T21	NT	NT	NT	NT	NT

Tournament	1920	1921	1922	1923	1924	1925	1926	1927	1928
The Open Championship	T47	T66	WD			57			CUT

Note: Batley only played in The Open Championship.

Did not play

WD = withdrew
? = finish unknown
CUT = missed the half-way cut
"T" indicates a tie for a place

== Team appearances ==
- England–Scotland Professional Match (representing England): 1912 (tie)
