= Frinton Invitation Tournament =

Tournament information
- Location: Frinton-on-Sea, Essex, England
- Established: 1927
- Course(s): Frinton Golf Club
- Final year: 1929

Final champion
- George Duncan

Location in England

The Frinton Invitation Tournament was a professional golf tournament played at Frinton Golf Club in Frinton-on-Sea, Essex, England. It was invitation event held in early 1927 and 1929, before the Ryder Cup, and provided competition for most of the British Ryder Cup team. It was a 36-hole stroke play event held on a single day.

== Detail ==
The 1927 event was held on 21 April with 30 professionals competing. The field included 5 of the 9 British Ryder Cup team that had recently been selected. The event was won by Ted Ray with rounds of 75 and 70, finishing two ahead of Charles Whitcombe, both being in Ryder Cup team. Of the other Ryder Cup players, George Duncan and George Gadd were tied for third while Arthur Havers was in a tie for sixth place. Herbert Jolly, who would later become a replacement in the Ryder Cup team, was also tied for sixth.

The 1929 event was held on 4 April with 18 players competing. It took place 3 weeks before the 1929 Ryder Cup and was one of a number of events designed to provide practice for the British team. 9 of the 10 members of the team took part, the missing player being Percy Alliss, who was then attached to a German club. George Duncan won with a score of 143, two ahead of Abe Mitchell and Charles Whitcombe. The event was a success for the Ryder Cup players with 7 being in the leading 9 and only Stewart Burns and Henry Cotton being in the bottom half of the field.

== Winners ==
Year	Winners	Country	Venue	Score	Margin of victory	Runner(s)-up	Winner's share (£)	Ref
1927	Ted Ray	Jersey	Frinton Golf Club	145	2 strokes	(England) Charles Whitcombe		
1928: No tournament
1929	George Duncan	Scotland	Frinton Golf Club	143	2 strokes	(England) Abe Mitchell (England) Charles Whitcombe		
