= Professional Golfers' Association =

Professional Golfers' Association may refer to:

- Professional golfer § Professional Golfers' Associations; especially:
  - Professional Golfers' Association (Great Britain and Ireland)
  - Professional Golfers' Association of America
