= Poppy Wingate =

English professional golfer (1902–1977)

Hannah Sophia Wingate, Lady Hinchcliffe (formerly Eadie; 1902–1977), known as Poppy Wingate, was an English professional golfer.

She was the first woman professional golfer in England, and the second in Britain after Scotswoman Meg Farquhar. When she competed in the 1933 Yorkshire Evening News Tournament held at Temple Newsam in Leeds, she was the first woman to compete in a professional golf tournament. After scoring 41 for the first 9 holes, she came home in 49 for a first round of 90. On the second qualifying day she tore up her card.

She was the first female golfer to be seen on television, appearing on the BBC on 7 June 1937 in her own 30-minute programme Tee Time.

She designed a range of women's golf clothing, sold by Avison Hare of Leeds and using the slogan "Smartness With Freedom". A pair of her golf shoes is owned by the R&A World Golf Museum at St Andrews, Scotland.

== Personal life ==
Wingate was born in 1902 when her father, Frank, was the professional at Harborne golf course; her two brothers Syd and Roland also became professional golfers. Her father and uncle were both among the founders of the Midlands Professional Golf Club, later the Midlands Golf Association, which helped pave the way for the formation of the PGA.

She married Dr Herbert Arnott Eadie, a medical doctor, in 1928, and they had two children. He died in 1931 in an accident at a motor racing event which he had attended in his capacity as one of the Leeds Motor Racing Club's medical officers: he had been a passenger on a tractor which overturned while climbing a very steep hill. She later married High Court judge Raymond Hinchcliffe (1900–1973), and became Lady Hinchcliffe, after his knighthood. She died at her home on 14 April 1977.
