= Broxbourne Tournament =

Tournament information
- Location: Broxbourne, Hertfordshire, England
- Established: 1923
- Course(s): Broxbourne Golf Club
- Final year: 1923

Final champion
- Frank Ball

Location in England

The Broxbourne Tournament was a professional golf tournament played at Broxbourne Golf Club near Broxbourne, England, from 12 to 14 July 1923. The event was organised to mark the opening of the new course. The tournament was won by Frank Ball who beat James Sherlock in the final. Ball had only qualified for the matchplay phase after a playoff on the first day.

== Detail ==
The first day consisted of 36 holes of stroke play with the leading 16 qualifying for the matchplay phase. James Ockenden led with a score of 143. Three players scored 152 and contested a 6-hole playoff to find the final two qualifiers. Frank Ball and Percy Alliss scored 26 while Mark Seymour took 27 after missing a 5-foot putt at the final hole. The first two rounds of the match-play were played on the next day, reducing the field from 16 to 4. The semi-finals on the final morning both went to the last hole. James Sherlock beat James Ockenden by one hole and Frank Ball beating George Gadd by the same score. The final was even close, with Ball beating Sherlock on the 19th hole.

== Winners ==
Year	Winners	Country	Venue	Margin of victory	Runner-up	Winner's share (£)	Ref
1923	Frank Ball	England	Broxbourne Golf Club	19 holes	(England) James Sherlock	100	
