= Sphere and Tatler Foursomes Tournament =

Sphere and Tatler Foursomes
Tournament information
- Location: England
- Established: 1911
- Month played: May
- Final year: 1914

Final champion
- James Batley and Len Holland

Sphere and Tatler Foursomes venues in England

The Sphere and Tatler Foursomes Tournament was a professional golf tournament played annually from 1911 to 1914. Total prize money was £350 provided by the owners of The Sphere and The Tatler. The winners received individual silver trophies. It followed a similar format to that used for the popular News of the World Matchplay except that it was a foursomes event rather than singles.

== Tournament history ==
=== Qualification process ===
As for the News of the World Matchplay, players qualified through regional competitions, playing individual stroke play over 36 holes. However, since 32 pairs contested the final stages, a total of 64 players qualified rather than the 32 who qualified for the News of the World Matchplay. The number qualifying from each section was predetermined. After the qualifying, the players were then drawn randomly into 32 pairs for the final stages, which consisted of a three-day knockout competition with two 18-hole matches per day on the first two days and then a 36-hole final on the final day.

=== Prize money ===
The winners received £50 each with the losing finalists getting £15 15s, the losing semi-finalists £8 8s, losing quarter-finalists £6 6s, second round losers £4 4s and first round losers £2 2s each.

=== 1911 ===
Qualification was by a series of 36-hole stroke-play competitions; one for each of the eight PGA sections. The Southern section had 24 qualifiers, the Northern section 14, the Midland section 9, the Western section 5, the Scottish section 4, the Welsh and Eastern sections 3 and the Irish section 2. Qualifying took place between 8 March and 9 May. The Southern section qualifying had over 150 entries and there were major problems finishing the 36 holes in a single day, even though a cut was introduced after the first round.

=== 1912 ===
The Scottish and Welsh section had an extra qualifier compared to 1911, while the Western and Eastern sections had one less. The Southern section was split into two, with 12 players qualifying from each venue. Qualifying took place between 7 March and 2 May.

=== 1913 ===
The Midland section had an extra qualifier compared to 1912, while the Western section had one less. The Southern section was again split into two, with 12 players qualifying from each venue. Qualifying took place between 17 April and 7 May.

=== 1914 ===
The number qualifying from the Southern section was increased by two compared to 1913, to 26, while Midland section and Welsh sections had one less. The Southern section was again split into two, with 13 players qualifying from each venue. Qualifying took place between 2 and 29 April.

=== Winners ===
Year	Winners	Country	Venue	Margin of victory	Runners-up	Winner's share (£)	Ref
1911	James Bradbeer & Sandy Herd	England; Scotland	Walton Heath Golf Club	8 & 7	(England) Walter Hambleton & (England) J.H. Taylor	50 (each)	
1912	George Duncan & James Sherlock	Scotland; England	Royal Liverpool Golf Club	4 & 2	(Scotland) James Braid & (England) Charles Roberts	50 (each)	
1913	Harry Vardon & Tom Williamson	Jersey; England	Royal Cinque Ports Golf Club	7 & 5	(England) Bert James & (England) Josh Taylor	50 (each)	
1914	James Batley & Len Holland	England; England	Sunningdale Golf Club	5 & 4	(Scotland) C McIntosh & (Scotland) George Smith	50 (each)	

== Harry Vardon Memorial Trophy ==
After his death, Harry Vardon's widow presented his 1913 trophy to South Herts Golf Club. The trophy is now awarded to the winner of the Harry Vardon Memorial Trophy, a club handicap competition.
