= Raymond Hinchcliffe =

British barrister and High Court judge (1900–1973)

Sir George Raymond Hinchcliffe (2 March 1900 – 6 September 1973) was a British barrister and was a High Court judge from 1957 to 1973. He was appointed KC in 1947. He was knighted on 1 February 1957.

== Marriage ==
He married golfing pioneer Poppy Wingate (1902–1977) on 10 May 1940, and had two step-children.
