= Frank Ball (golfer) =

English golfer

Personal information
- Nationality: England
- Born: c. 1892 West Kirby, Cheshire, England
- Spouse: Lucille Ball

Career
- Sport: Golf
- Status: Professional
- Professional wins: 3

Best results in major championships
- Masters Tournament: DNP
- PGA Championship: DNP
- U.S. Open: T22: 1928
- The Open Championship: T3: 1924

Frank Ball (born c. 1892) was an English professional golfer who played in the early 20th century. He tied for third place in the 1924 Open Championship.

== Early life ==
Ball was born circa 1892 in West Kirby, Cheshire (now Merseyside), England, to William Henry Ball and Hannah Silcock Roscoe. He had four brothers and four sisters. His birthplace was but a short distance south of the Royal Liverpool Golf Club at Hoylake.

Frank's father, William (1856–1926), was a greenkeeper from Hoylake. Frank's brothers Tom, Sydney, William Henry (Harry) were also professional golfers, as was Harry's son Errie.

== Golf career ==
In 1923 Ball reached the final of two important tournaments within a month. In late-June he lost to Arthur Havers in the Glasgow Herald Tournament but in mid-July he won the Broxbourne Tournament beating James Sherlock.

The 1924 Open Championship was held 26–27 June at Royal Liverpool Golf Club in Hoylake, England. The American golfer Walter Hagen won the second of his four Open Championships, one stroke ahead of runner-up Ernest Whitcombe. Ball finished in a tie for third place with Macdonald Smith.

He sailed from Southampton on 29 October 1926 aboard RMS Andania to find new opportunities in America and quickly found work at the East Lake Golf Club in Atlanta, Georgia. His career and whereabouts after moving to Atlanta is somewhat of a mystery.

== Death ==
Ball's date of death is unknown.

== Professional wins (3) ==
- 1923 Broxbourne Tournament, Kent Professional Championship
- 1924 Kent President's Cup

== Results in major championships ==
Tournament	1920	1921	1922	1923	1924	1925	1926	1927	1928	1929
U.S. Open									T22	T32
The Open Championship	T61	T19		T16	T3	T24				

Tournament	1930	1931	1932	1933	1934	1935
U.S. Open						
The Open Championship						T27

Note: Ball only played in The Open Championship and the U.S. Open.

Top 10
Did not play

"T" indicates a tie for a place
