= Syd Wingate =

English golfer

Personal information
- Full name: Sydney Wingate
- Nationality: England
- Born: 1894 Harborne, Warwickshire, England
- Died: 17 April 1953 (aged 59) Leeds, Yorkshire, England

Career
- Sport: Golf
- Status: Professional

Best results in major championships
- Masters Tournament: DNP
- PGA Championship: DNP
- U.S. Open: DNP
- The Open Championship: T6: 1925

Sydney Wingate (1894 – 17 April 1953) was an English professional golfer. He twice finished in the top 10 of the Open Championship, in 1920 and 1925.

== Golfing career ==
Wingate was from a golfing family. His father, Frank (1872–1923), was a professional, as also were his uncles Charles and Sydney. His sister Poppy (1903–1977) was the first women to play in a professional tournament in Great Britain while his brother Roland (1896–1968) emigrated to America in 1922 and was a professional there.

Wingate was born in Harborne where his father was professional at the local club. His father moved to Hornsea in 1906. After being an assistant to his father at Hornsea, he moved again with his father to Ravensworth Golf Club, Gateshead in 1913 and was then professional at Wearside Golf Club, Sunderland from 1921 to 1923. In 1924 he became the first professional at Temple Newsam Golf Club where he stayed until leaving in 1935 due to ill-health at the age of 42. He died in 1953 following a heart attack.

Wingate won the Northumberland and Durham Open Championship four times in succession from 1920 to 1923 and the Yorkshire Open Championship in 1928. He was runner-up in the Leeds Cup in 1920 and a semi-finalist in the News of the World Matchplay in 1921.

== Results in major championships ==
Tournament	1920	1921	1922	1923	1924	1925	1926	1927	1928
The Open Championship	T7			T12	T22	T6	CUT		T23

Note: Wingate only played in The Open Championship.

Top 10
Did not play

CUT = missed the half-way cut
"T" indicates a tie for a place
