= James Bradbeer =

English golfer (1880–1937)

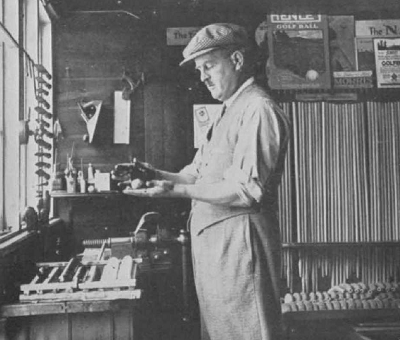
- Bradbeer in his workshop, c. 1920

Personal information
- Full name: Cuthbert James Hunt Bradbeer
- Nationality: England
- Born: 1880 Berrow, Somerset, England
- Died: 18 August 1937 (aged 56) Burnham-on-Sea, Somerset, England

Career
- Sport: Golf
- Status: Professional
- Professional wins: 3

Best results in major championships
- Masters Tournament: DNP
- PGA Championship: DNP
- U.S. Open: DNP
- The Open Championship: T7: 1913

Cuthbert James Hunt Bradbeer (1880 – 18 August 1937) was an English professional golfer who played in the early 20th century. His best finish in a major championship was a tie for seventh in the 1913 Open Championship held on 23–24 June at Royal Liverpool Golf Club in Hoylake, England. He made his own gutta-percha golf balls and was also a club maker. Bradbeer was a frequent competitor in the Open Championship—having made at least 15 starts—and made his final appearance in 1935 at age 54.

== Early life ==
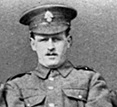
Bradbeer, 1915

Bradbeer was born in Berrow, Somerset, England, in 1880, the second child of George Bradbeer and Helena (née Hunt). He was one of nine brothers, most of whom became golf professionals. At the 1928 Open Championship James and his three youngest brothers, Bob (1894–1938), Ernest (1899–1969) and Fred (1904–1988), all qualified. Of the four only Bob made the cut, finishing tied for 23rd place.

As a young man he learned how to make his own gutta-percha golf balls and also apprenticed as a club maker. One of his golf ball designs from circa 1904 was a bramble-patterned golf ball he called "The Finch".

Bradbeer was a professional at Finchley Golf Club in north London from about 1901. He played in the first Tooting Bec Cup in October 1901, a tournament organised by the London and Counties Professional Golfers' Association, the forerunner of the Professional Golfers' Association which was founded later the same year. In about 1905 he became the professional at Porters Park Golf Club in Radlett, England, where he stayed for over 30 years.

During World War I, Bradbeer served in the Sportsmen's Battalion, part of what were called the Pals Battalions which were specially constituted battalions of the British Army composed of men who had enlisted together in local recruiting drives, with the promise that they would be able to serve alongside their friends, neighbors and colleagues ("pals"), rather than being arbitrarily allocated to battalions. Bradbeer was able to serve his country alongside several of his golfing acquaintances who also joined the battalion.

== Golf career ==
=== Sphere and Tatler Foursomes Tournament ===
In 1911, Bradbeer was paired with Sandy Herd and together they won the 1911 Sphere and Tatler Foursomes Tournament from Walter Hambleton and J.H. Taylor by the convincing score of 8 and 7. Bradbeer had been runner-up in the Southern Professional Foursomes Tournament in 1909 and 1910.

=== 1913 Open Championship ===
Bradbeer finished tied for seventh place in the 1913 Open Championship.

==== Details of play ====
The 1913 Open Championship was held 23–24 June at Royal Liverpool Golf Club in Hoylake, England. J.H. Taylor won the Championship for the fifth time, eight strokes ahead of runner-up Ted Ray.

Qualifying took place on 19, 20 and 21 June. The top 20 and ties qualified on each of the three days. Ray led after the first day on 147, with Taylor on 148, Irishman Michael Moran on 150 and Thomas Renouf on 153. Gale force winds on the second day led to some high scoring. Bradbeer, however, was able to cope with the heavy winds and posted consistent rounds of 78-79-81-79=317. He tied for seventh place with three other competitors. Each of the seventh place finishers won £2 10s.

=== Ryder Cup ===
Bradbeer was one of the PGA selection committee's choices to play in the 1935 and 1937 Ryder Cup matches.

== Death ==
Bradbeer died on 18 August 1937 in the War Memorial Hospital, Burnham-on-Sea, Somerset, England. Bradbeer had travelled from his home in Radlett, Hertfordshire to Burnham for a holiday. On arrival he called a doctor and went into hospital for a major operation. He was still playing at a high level. In April that year he had won a local PGA event, the Porters Park Bowl, playing off a handicap of +2.

== Tournament wins (3) ==
- 1911 Sphere and Tatler Foursomes Tournament (with Sandy Herd)
- 1926 Hertfordshire Open Championship
- 1937 Porters Park Bowl

== Results in major championships ==
Tournament	1904	1905	1906	1907	1908	1909	1910	1911	1912	1913	1914	1915	1916	1917	1918	1919
The Open Championship	CUT		CUT	T21	T51			CUT	T52	T7	T14	NT	NT	NT	NT	NT

Tournament	1920	1921	1922	1923	1924	1925	1926	1927	1928	1929	1930	1931	1932	1933	1934	1935
The Open Championship	T50						T45		CUT		T39	CUT			CUT	CUT

Note: Bradbeer only played in The Open Championship.

Top 10
Did not play

CUT = missed the half-way cut
"T" indicates a tie for a place

== Team appearances ==
- Seniors vs Juniors (representing the Seniors): 1928 (winners)
