= Thomas Renouf =

British golfer (1878–1955)

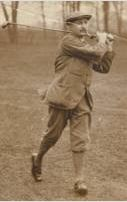
- Renouf, c. 1907

Personal information
- Full name: Thomas George Renouf
- Nationality: Jersey
- Born: c. 1878 Grouville, Jersey
- Died: 14 July 1955 (aged 77) Marple, Cheshire, England

Career
- Sport: Golf
- Turned professional: c. 1895
- Professional wins: 6

Best results in major championships
- Masters Tournament: DNP
- PGA Championship: DNP
- U.S. Open: DNP
- The Open Championship: 5th: 1909

Thomas George Renouf (c. 1878 – 14 July 1955) was an English professional golfer from Jersey who played in the late 19th and early 20th century. He had multiple top-10 finishes in the Open Championship. His best result was fifth in the 1909 Open Championship. Renouf caddied in his youth at Royal Jersey Golf Club and became a skilled club maker as well as a manufacturer of golf balls.

== Early life ==
Thomas Renouf was born in Grouville, Jersey. He learned the game by starting out as a caddie and also developed skills as a club and ball maker. Thomas's younger brother, Francis (Frank) George Renouf, was also a professional golfer. Frank was killed in France in 1915 in World War I.

== Golf career ==
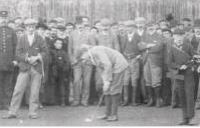
Renouf (left) watches Harry Vardon putt in a match at Silloth-on-Solway Golf Club in 1898.

By the age of 17, and barely speaking any English, he had turned professional and traveled to the north of England taking a job at the Roundhay Golf Club in Leeds. After a few intermediate stops at different clubs he was posted at Silloth in 1898 where he remained for 8 years. At Silloth he was a teacher and mentor of the great lady golfer Cecil Leitch. When the British PGA was formed in 1901, Renouf was a founding member.

Renouf left Silloth for Trafford Park, Manchester in 1906, and remained there until 1929. During his tenure at Trafford Park he began designing golf courses—particularly in the north of England—and added the layout of the Alderley Edge course to his resumé.

Renouf had a number of regional tournament successes while he was posted at Trafford Park; wins included the Manchester Courier Cup in 1910 and 1930 and the Manchester Despatch Trophy in 1924.

His abilities on the golf course as a successful and highly competent professional were clear after he had six caps for England between 1903 and 1912. He had an excellent record in matches against Scotland, scoring wins in 7 of 10 matches played.

=== 1909 Open Championship ===
In the 1909 Open Championship, held 10–11 June at Royal Cinque Ports Golf Club in Deal, Kent, England, Renouf carded rounds of 76-78-76-73=302 finishing in fifth place and won £7 10s. J.H. Taylor won the tournament with scores of 74-73-74-74=295.

=== News of the World Tournament ===
At the age of 45—by which time he had moved to Stockport Golf Club—he reached the final of the important News of the World Tournament in 1923 at Walton Heath having beaten Arthur Havers on his way to the final match, which he lost to Reg Wilson.

=== Leeds Cup ===
Renouf finished second in the 1911 Leeds Cup Tournament at Roundhay Golf Club, losing by one stroke to Ted Ray. His tenacity paid off in 1914 when he won the event by two strokes from three runners-up at Northumberland Golf Club.

=== Northern Professional Championship ===
He won the 1920 Northern Professional Championship and repeated the feat in 1929 at Pleasington Golf Club in Blackburn.

== Death and legacy ==
In 1929, Renouf was posted at Stockport Golf Club at Torkington where, just before his retirement in 1938, he played a 36-hole exhibition match against Henry Cotton. He was named captain of the British PGA in 1931–32. He is perhaps best remembered for his consistent, steady performances in the Open Championship which included numerous top-10 finishes.

Renouf died at Marple, Cheshire, England, on 14 July 1955 at the age of 77.

== Results in major championships ==
Tournament	1897	1898	1899
The Open Championship	T14	9	T12

Tournament	1900	1901	1902	1903	1904	1905	1906	1907	1908	1909
The Open Championship		T12	T20	WD	23	T16	T8	T17	T28	5

Tournament	1910	1911	1912	1913	1914	1915	1916	1917	1918	1919
The Open Championship	T8	T13	19	T5		NT	NT	NT	NT	NT

Tournament	1920	1921	1922	1923	1924	1925	1926	1927	1928	1929
The Open Championship			T43				CUT			CUT

Note: Renouf only played in The Open Championship.

Top 10
Did not play

NT = No tournament
WD = withdrew
CUT = missed the half-way cut
"T" indicates a tie for a place

== Team appearances ==
- England–Scotland Professional Match (representing England): 1903, 1904 (tie), 1905 (tie), 1910 (winners), 1912 (tie)
- Coronation Match (representing the Professionals): 1911 (winners)
