= Frinton Golf Club =

Golf club in Essex, England

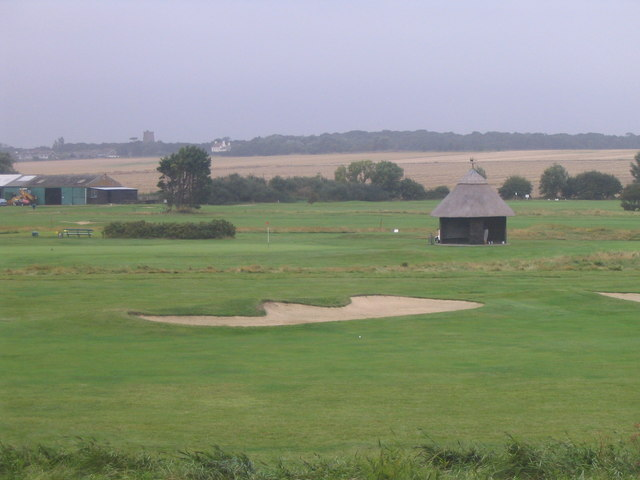

- Location within Essex
- 51°49′21″N 1°14′6″E

Club information
- Location: Frinton-on-Sea, Essex, England
- Established: 1895

Frinton Golf Club is a coastal golf club, located on the suburbs of Frinton-on-Sea, Essex, England.

The club was instituted founded in 1895 and officially instituted in August 1896. In 1910 it had a membership of 380. The course length is 6265 yards and was designed by Willie Park Jnr. in 1904, with later additions by Harry Colt. The club course also dates to this period, designed by Homer & Sharp and built between 1903 and 1905. The Ryder Cup golfers practiced here in 1929 prior to their first Ryder Cup victory at Moortown. In 1929-31 the club was involved in a legal dispute over the sale of alcohol on the premises.
