= William Horne (golfer) =

English golfer

Personal information
- Full name: William Henry Horne
- Nationality: England
- Born: 1880 Dover, Kent, England
- Died: Unknown

Career
- Sport: Golf
- Status: Professional
- Professional wins: 2

Best results in major championships
- Masters Tournament: DNP
- PGA Championship: DNP
- U.S. Open: DNP
- The Open Championship: 7th: 1909

William Henry Horne (born 1880) was an English professional golfer. He finished in the top 10 in the Open Championship in 1909 and 1920 and was South African Open champion in 1919. He was a well-travelled professional and was also renowned for his long hitting.

== Golf career ==
Horne was first professional at Royal Guernsey Golf Club in 1905. He then became the first professional at Carlsbad Golf Club in 1906. Carlsbad is a spa town that was then part of Austria but is now in the Czech Republic. He was then at Beckenham Golf Club in 1907 and 1908 and at Chertsey Golf Club from 1909 to early 1912, when he resigned. He then moved to Greatstone Golf Club at Littlestone-on-Sea which he was representing when finishing third in the 1912 Baden-Baden Open Championship of Germany.

Later in 1912 he travelled to New York and worked for a stunt as a "masked golfer" at the public golf course in Van Cortlandt Park, New York. In early 1914, he became professional at Durban Golf Club in South Africa. In 1919, he won the South African Open by 9 strokes.

He returned to England in late 1919 and played in a few tournaments in 1919 and 1920. In 1922, he became professional at Rye Country Club in New York.

At the North Berwick Tournament in 1909, Horne set a record for the longest drive in a competition at 388 yards. At the 13th hole, played to a temporary green, Horne reached the green on the downhill sloping hole 12 yards short of the pin. There were initial reports that the drive was as much as 469 yards, but this seems to have been due to confusion about the tee used or the use of the temporary green. The distance was later measured.

== Professional wins ==
- 1909 Southern Professional Foursomes Tournament (with James Batley)
- 1919 South African Open

== Results in major championships ==
Tournament	1907	1908	1909	1910	1911	1912	1913	1914	1915	1916	1917	1918	1919	1920
The Open Championship	T25		7	WD	T35	T20			NT	NT	NT	NT	NT	T9

Note: Horne only played in The Open Championship.

Top 10
Did not play

NT = No tournament
WD = withdrew
"T" indicates a tie for a place

== Family life ==
Horne was married to Hilda Barker, who was born on Guernsey. She left England in 1923 to join her husband. William and Hilda are both recorded in the 1940 US census living in Harrison, New York.
