= Royal Cinque Ports Golf Club =

British golf club in Deal, Kent

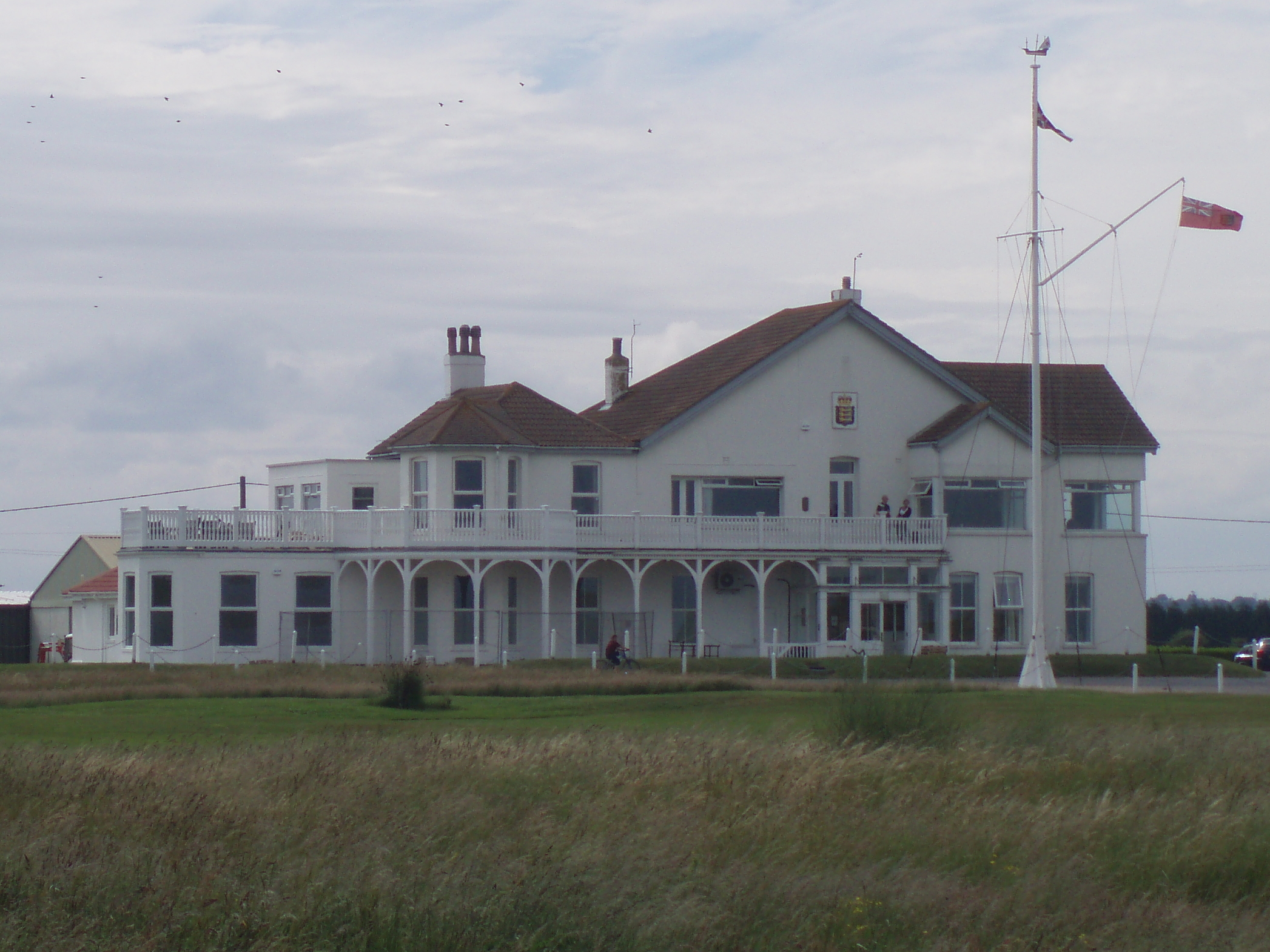
- Clubhouse in 2008

- Location in Deal, Kent, England Royal Cinque Ports Golf Club (Kent)
- 51.2395°N 1.3965°E

Club information
- Location: Deal, England
- Established: 1892, 134 years ago 1896 (second nine)
- Type: Private
- Total holes: 18
- Tournaments: The Open Championship; The Amateur
- Website: royalcinqueports.com
- Designed by: Henry Hunter, James Braid (1919), Sir Guy Campbell and Henry Cotton (1946 restoration)
- Par: 71
- Length: 7,245 yards (6,625 m)
- Course rating: 75

Royal Cinque Ports Golf Club is an 18-hole links golf course, in the town of Deal in Kent, in southeastern England. The course is often known simply as Deal.

Founded 134 years ago in 1892, its name derives from Deal's membership of an ancient group of trading towns granted special privileges by the medieval English monarchs, known as the Cinque Ports. The course runs along the coast of Sandwich Bay, on the same stretch of coastline as Royal St George's Golf Club and Prince's Golf Club, adjacent to the north.

Royal Cinque Ports hosted The Open Championship in 1909 and 1920. Two more were scheduled for 1938 and 1949, but both were relocated when abnormally high tides inundated the course; both were held at nearby Royal St George's. Consequently, the club was removed from the Open Championship rota, but remains a final qualifying course (most recently in 2025). It has also continued to host various other tournaments including The Amateur Championship (1923, 1982, 2013) and, since 1925, it has hosted the Public Schools Championship every year.

Karen Stupples, winner of the 2004 Weetabix Women's British Open, is a member of Royal Cinque Ports.

== Scorecard ==
Royal Cinque Ports Golf Club Scorecard, Black Tees

Hole	Yards	Par	Hole	Yards	Par
1	420	4	10	361	4
2	434	4	11	402	4
3	566	5	12	460	4
4	151	3	13	485	4
5	600	5	14	219	3
6	356	4	15	476	4
7	413	4	16	549	5
8	169	3	17	394	4
9	458	4	18	454	4
Out	3,567	36	In	3,800	36
			Total	7,367	72

== The Open Championship ==
Royal Cinque Ports Golf Club, Deal has hosted The Open Championship twice.

Year	Winner	Score				
Year	Winner	R1	R2	R3	R4	Total
1909	(England) J.H. Taylor ^{4th}	74	73	74	74	295
1920	(Scotland) George Duncan	80	80	71	72	303

- Note: For multiple winners of The Open Championship, superscript ordinal identifies which in their respective careers.

== Notable members ==
- David Gordon Hines was responsible for the development of co-operatives in Tanganyika and Uganda, improving the living standards of farmers in their transition from subsistence farming to cash crops. In Uganda in the 1950s, his organisation encouraged some 500,000 farmers to join these co-operatives.

== See also ==
- List of golf clubs granted Royal status
