= Len Holland =

English golfer

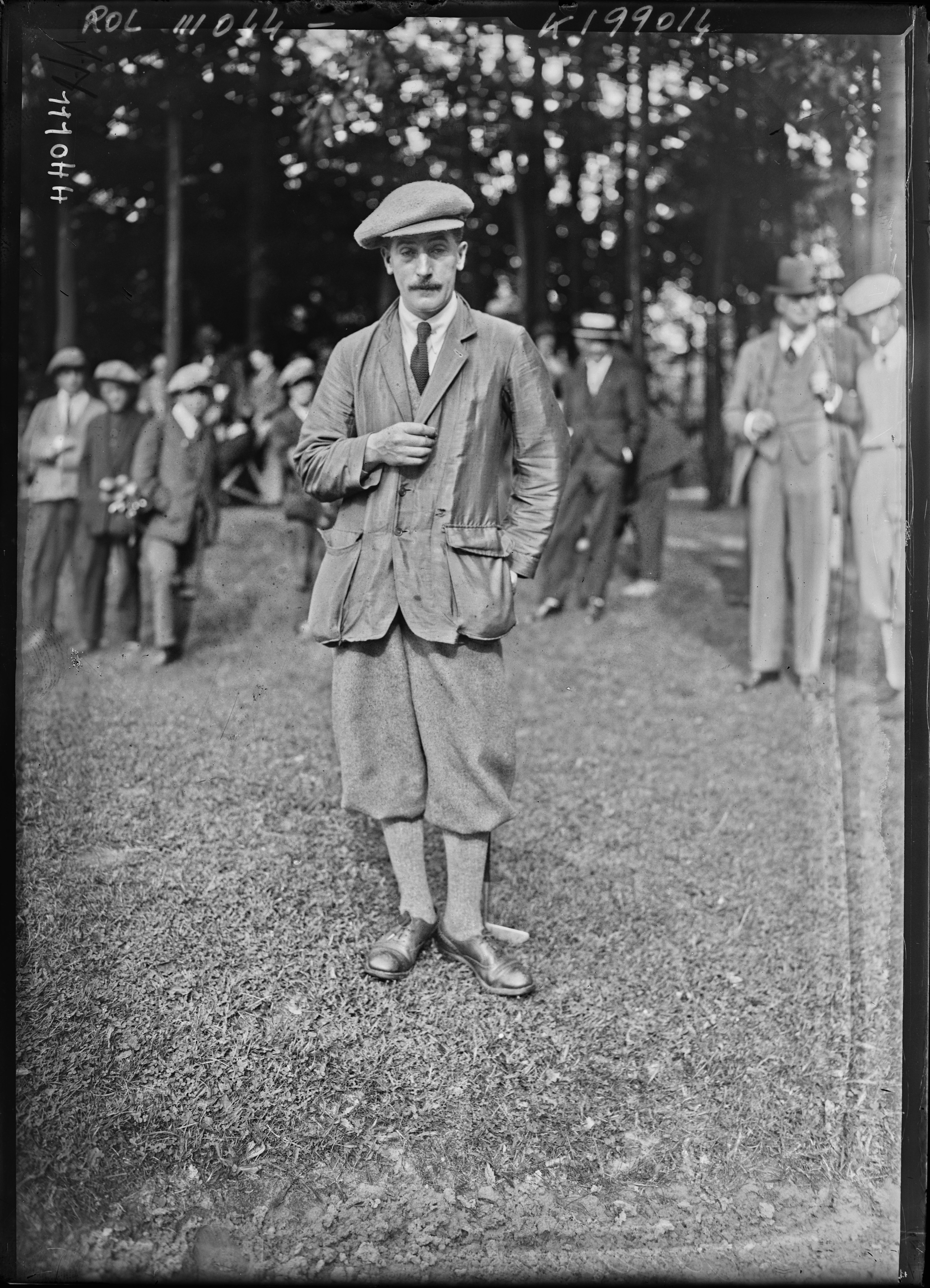

Personal information
- Full name: Leonard Holland
- Nationality: England
- Born: c. 1888 Burgess Hill, Sussex, England

Career
- Sport: Golf
- Status: Professional
- Professional wins: 3

Best results in major championships
- Masters Tournament: DNP
- PGA Championship: DNP
- U.S. Open: DNP
- The Open Championship: 5th: 1920

Leonard Holland (born c. 1888) was an English professional golfer. He finished in the top-10 in the Open Championship in 1920 and 1924.

He was brought up in Caister-on-Sea, Norfolk and was later professional at Northamptonshire County Golf Club from 1911 and then, from 1924, at Gerrards Cross Golf Club.

In 1914 he won the Sphere and Tatler Foursomes Tournament in partnership with James Batley, beating the Scottish pair of C McIntosh and George Smith 5&4 in the final. His biggest individual win was in the 1925 Yorkshire Evening News Tournament. He beat James Ockenden 3&2 in the final.

== Professional wins ==
- 1914 Sphere and Tatler Foursomes Tournament (with James Batley)
- 1925 Yorkshire Evening News Tournament
- 1930 West of England Professional Championship

== Results in major championships ==
Tournament	1911	1912	1913	1914	1915	1916	1917	1918	1919
The Open Championship	T35			T34	NT	NT	NT	NT	NT

Tournament	1920	1921	1922	1923	1924	1925	1926	1927	1928	1929
The Open Championship	5	T16	T12	T25	T6		CUT	T23	WD	

Tournament	1930	1931	1932	1933	1934	1935	1936	1937	1938	1939
The Open Championship	T32	T23				T27		CUT		CUT

Note: Holland only played in The Open Championship.

Top 10
Did not play

NT = No tournament
WD = withdrew
CUT = missed the half-way cut
"T" indicates a tie for a place
