= James Ockenden =

English golfer (1885–1949)

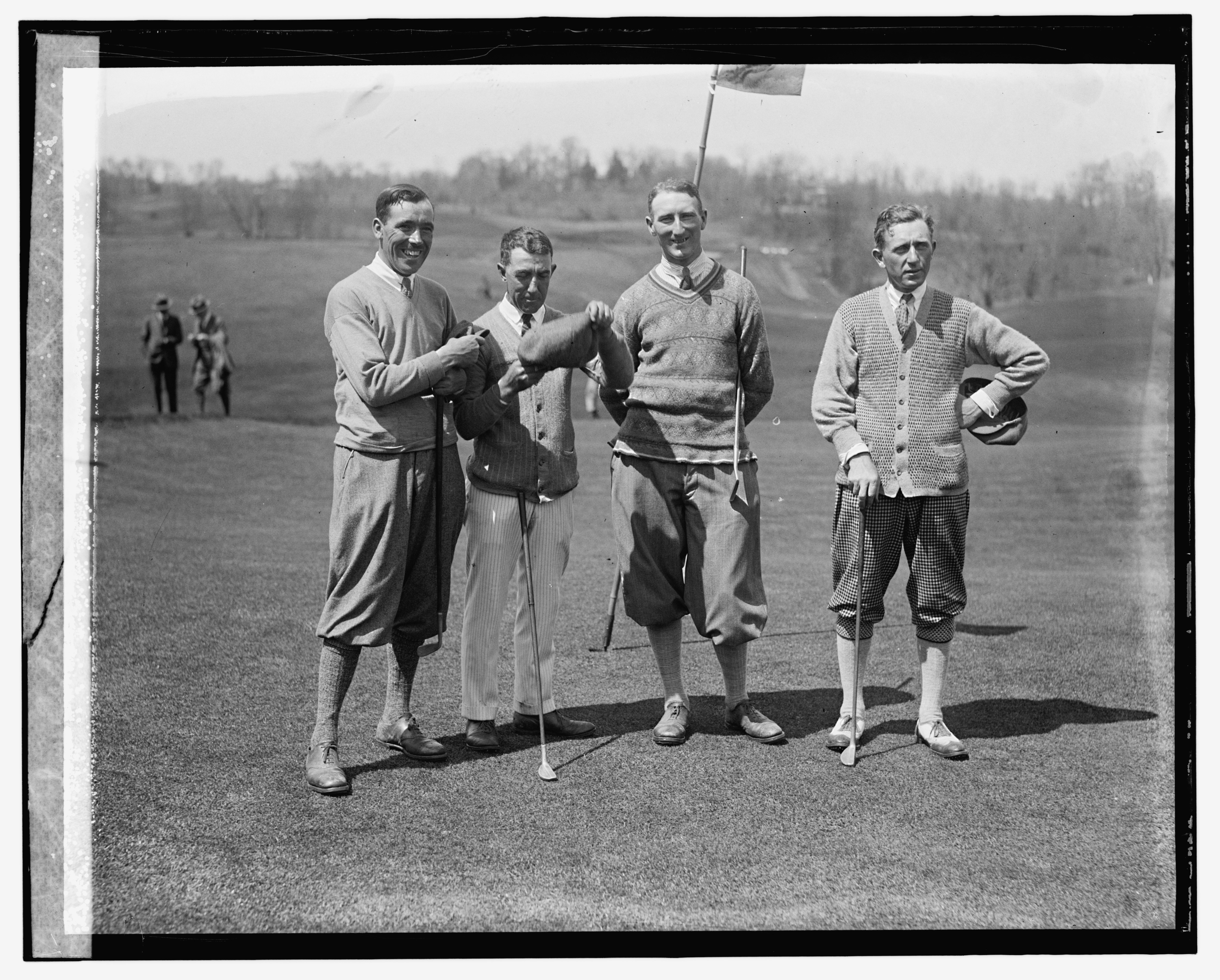
- James Ockenden (left)

Personal information
- Full name: James Ockenden
- Nationality: England
- Born: July 1885 Epsom, Surrey, England
- Died: 30 November 1949 (aged 64) Finchley, London, England

Career
- Sport: Golf
- Turned professional: 1905
- Professional wins: 2

Best results in major championships
- Masters Tournament: DNP
- PGA Championship: DNP
- U.S. Open: DNP
- The Open Championship: 7th: 1914

James Ockenden (July 1885 – 30 November 1949) was an English professional golfer. His best finish in a men's major golf championship was seventh place in the 1914 Open Championship.

== Professional career ==
Ockenden was first employed at Epsom Golf Club near his home, before moving to Wembley Golf Club. In 1914 he moved to West Drayton Golf Club but in 1916 he joined up and served in France during World War I. After the war West Drayton was redeveloped and Ockenden moved again to Raynes Park Golf Club.

Prior to the war his best performance was to finish seventh in the 1914 Open Championship. He had some success in the 1920 News of the World Match Play tournament and the following year he was selected for the British team in the International Match at Gleneagles. He won the 1922 Roehampton Tournament and the 1923 Open de France. Following this success he toured America with Arthur Havers from December 1923 to April 1924 during which he was runner-up in the 1924 Texas Open.

In 1925, Raynes Park was also sold for housing and he moved to Hanger Hill Golf Club and then to his final club, North Middlesex Golf Club, in 1928. At North Middlesex he was assisted by his two sons, James and Frederick.

== Personal life ==
Ockenden's first wife Beatrice died in 1930 and he remarried to Annie in 1933. His son James moved to South Africa in 1934 and was the runner-up at the South African PGA Championship in 1947 and 1948.

== Death and legacy ==
In December, James travelled to South Africa to join his son but while there had his leg amputated. He returned to England in November 1949 but died three weeks later. On 3 September 1949 a four-ball match was played at North Middlesex to raise money for Ockenden. Bobby Locke went round in 60, 9-under-par. The match raised about £450.

== Professional wins ==
- 1922 Roehampton Tournament
- 1923 Open de France

== Results in major championships ==
Tournament	1911	1912	1913	1914	1915	1916	1917	1918	1919
The Open Championship	T29	T37		7	NT	NT	NT	NT	NT

Tournament	1920	1921	1922	1923	1924	1925	1926	1927	1928	1929
The Open Championship	T66	T51		T25		T20	T39		T23	T49

Tournament	1930	1931	1932	1933	1934	1935
The Open Championship			CUT			CUT

Note: Ockenden only played in The Open Championship.

Top 10
Did not play

NT = No tournament
CUT = missed the half-way cut
"T" indicates a tie for a place

== Team appearances ==
- Great Britain vs USA (representing Great Britain): 1921 (winners)
