= Josh Taylor (golfer) =

English golfer

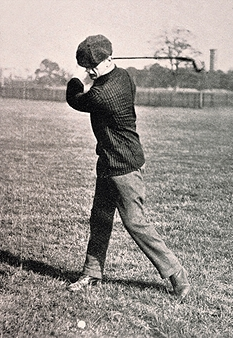
- Taylor in July 1900

Personal information
- Full name: Joshua Taylor
- Nationality: England
- Born: 1881 Northam, Devon, England
- Died: 28 September 1957 (aged 76) Richmond, Surrey, England

Career
- Sport: Golf
- Status: Professional
- Professional wins: 1

Best results in major championships
- Masters Tournament: DNP
- PGA Championship: DNP
- U.S. Open: DNP
- The Open Championship: T14: 1913

Joshua Taylor (1881 – 28 September 1957) was an English professional golfer, the younger brother of J. H. Taylor. He played in the 1913 England–Scotland Professional Match and for Great Britain in the 1921 match against America.

== Early life ==
Taylor was born Northam, Devon in 1881, 10 years after his brother J. H. Taylor.

== Golf career ==
Playing with his brother J.H., he won the Southern Professional Foursomes Tournament in 1910. The event was played in late January at Stoke Poges. The ground was very frosty for the first two days and then there was snow followed by a rapid thaw which left the course waterlogged and the final had to be postponed. The 36-hole final against James Bradbeer and George Charles was rearranged for 8 February and resulted in a 6&5 win for the Taylor brothers.

Taylor qualified for the final stage of the 1913 Sphere and Tatler Foursomes Tournament. Drawn with a young Bert James from Devon, they reached the final, losing 7&5 to Harry Vardon and Tom Williamson in the 36-hole final. He was selected for the England–Scotland Professional Match the same year and performed well in the subsequent Open Championship. finishing tied for 14th, 15 strokes behind his brother.

Taylor reached the final of the 1920 News of the World Match Play where he met defending champion Abe Mitchell, losing 3&2 in the 36-hole final. The following year he was selected for the British team in an international match against America, winning both his matches.

He was a professional at Aldeburgh and later at a number of London clubs: Acton (from 1909), Sudbury (from 1920) and Richmond Park (from 1924).

== Death ==
Taylor died in Richmond, Surrey on 28 September 1957 aged 76.

== Professional wins (1) ==
- 1910 Southern Professional Foursomes Tournament (with J. H. Taylor)

== Results in major championships ==
Tournament	1902	1903	1904	1905	1906	1907	1908	1909
The Open Championship	CUT			39	CUT			

Tournament	1910	1911	1912	1913	1914	1915	1916	1917	1918	1919
The Open Championship	T55	T24	T43	T14	T25	NT	NT	NT	NT	NT

Tournament	1920	1921	1922	1923	1924	1925	1926	1927	1928
The Open Championship	T35	T57					WD		WD

Note: Taylor only played in The Open Championship.

Did not play

NT = No tournament
WD = withdrew
CUT = missed the half-way cut
"T" indicates a tie for a place

== Team appearances ==
- England–Scotland Professional Match (representing England): 1913 (winners)
- Great Britain vs USA (representing Great Britain): 1921 (winners)
