= George Duncan (golfer) =

Scottish professional golfer (1883–1964)

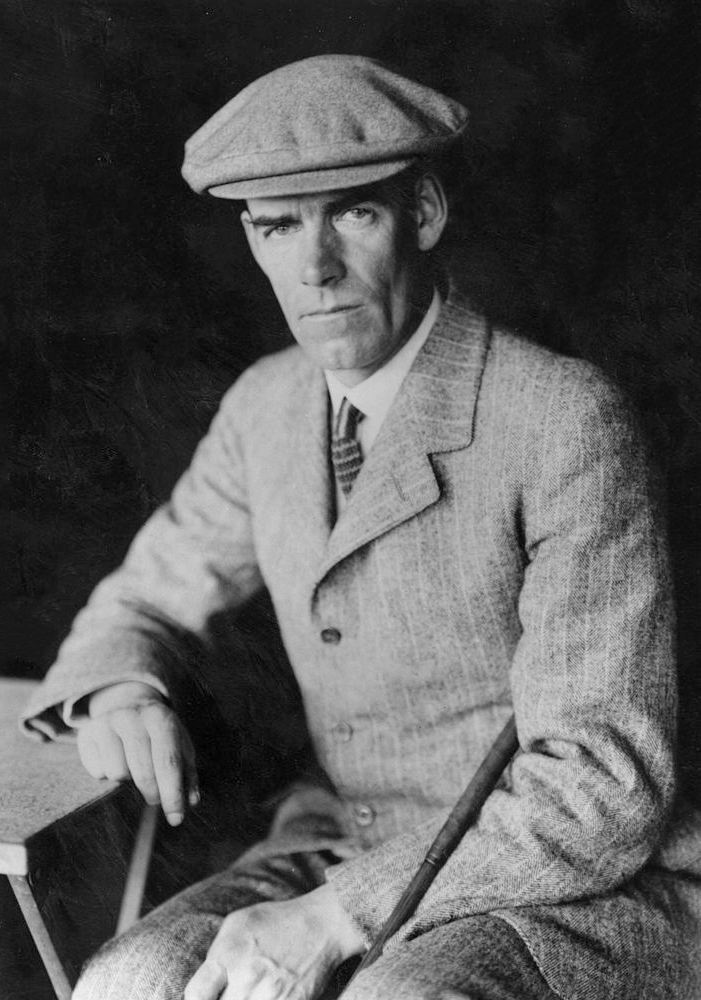
- Duncan, c. 1920

Personal information
- Nationality: Scotland
- Born: 16 September 1883 Methlick, Scotland
- Died: 15 January 1964 (aged 80) Leeds, England

Career
- Sport: Golf
- Status: Professional
- Professional wins: 22

Best results in major championships (wins: 1)
- Masters Tournament: DNP
- PGA Championship: DNP
- U.S. Open: 6th: 1922
- The Open Championship: Won: 1920

George Duncan (16 September 1883 – 15 January 1964) was a Scottish professional golfer. He was also a golf course designer. His much sought-after professional teaching and swing analysis skills lead to him being referred to as "the pro's pro." He won the 1920 Open Championship.

== Early life ==
Duncan was born in Methlick, Aberdeenshire, Scotland, on 16 September 1883. He was first apprenticed as a carpenter and rejected a chance to become a professional footballer at Aberdeen to become a golf professional.

== Golf career ==
Duncan was well known for his fast pace of play; he would simply walk to his ball, drop his limbs into his stance immediately, and hit the ball. If he ever studied the line and shape of his shot, he had done it before he reached his ball, for there was no pause when he got to it. As for practice swings, he regarded them as totally unnecessary and barely legal – close to practising on the course.

=== 1920 Open Championship ===
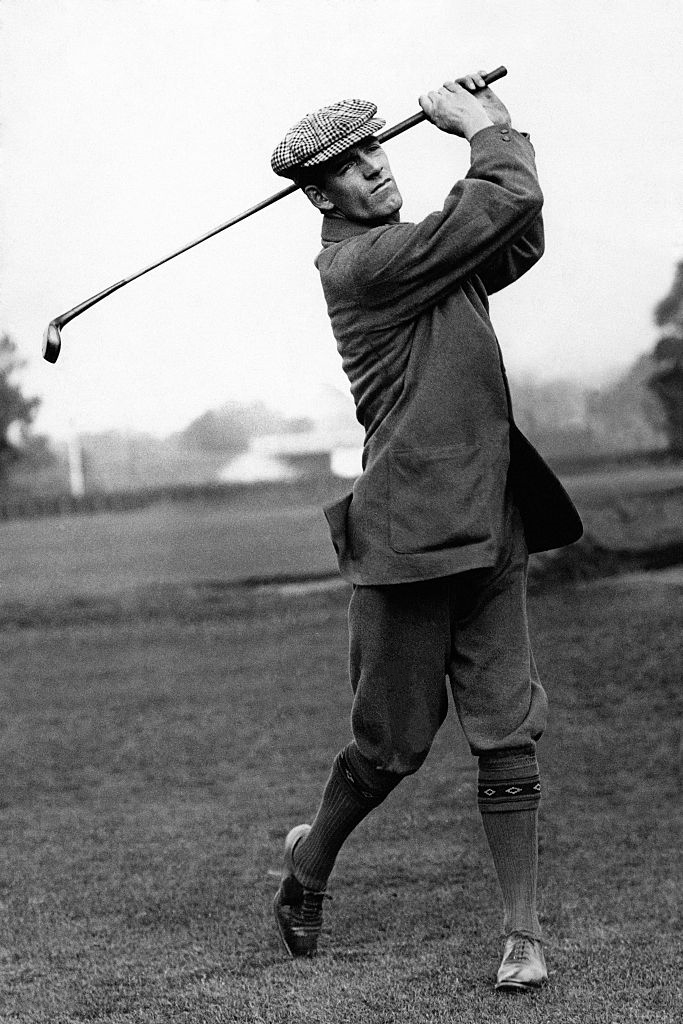
Duncan in the 1920s

In 1920, he won the first post World War I Open Championship at Royal Cinque Ports in Kent, in one of the greatest comebacks in Open Championship history. After shooting 80 in his first two rounds, Duncan was thirteen shots behind the leader, Abe Mitchell, before the final two rounds were played, but made up the deficit to win by two shots from Sandy Herd. His rounds were 80-80-71-72=303. He is the last player to win a golf major with a score of 80 for a round.

=== 1922 Open Championship ===
Although he did not win the British Open in 1922, his third round of that Open was included as one of the 25 greatest rounds of golf ever played in the Guinness Book of Golf Records Facts and Champions. His third round 69 was only the third round shot under 70 in British Open history; a major achievement given the limitations of the golf technology of the day. He just failed to win the 1922 Open, eventually losing to Walter Hagen by a margin of one stroke. The scene of his demise was a dip in the fairway in front of the 18th green from which he fluffed a chip shot to a position five yards short of the pin. He eventually missed the crucial putt for a tie with Hagen, which led to the short position in front of the 18th being ironically named "Duncan's Hollow."

=== Ryder Cup ===
He played for Great Britain in the Ryder Cup in 1927, 1929, and 1931. He was playing captain in 1929 when Great Britain was the victorious side.

== Death and legacy ==
Duncan died on 15 January 1964 in Leeds, England. He is best remembered for winning the 1920 Open Championship.

== Tournament wins (22) ==
Note: This list may be incomplete.

- 1906 Leeds Cup
- 1908 London Professional Foursomes Tournament (with Charles Mayo), Manchester Tournament
- 1909 North Berwick Tournament
- 1912 Sphere and Tatler Foursomes Tournament (with James Sherlock), Belgian Open
- 1913 News of the World Match Play, French Open
- 1914 Bishop's Stortford Tournament, Port Seton Professional Tournament
- 1919 Killermont Tournament, St Andrews Tournament ("Victory Open") (joint winner with Abe Mitchell)
- 1920 **The Open Championship**, Roehampton Invitation Tournament, Daily Mail Tournament, Glasgow Herald Tournament
- 1922 Daily Mail Tournament
- 1923 Tooting Bec Cup
- 1924 Glasgow Herald Tournament
- 1927 Irish Open, French Open
- 1929 Frinton Invitation Tournament

Major championship is shown in bold.

== Major championships ==
=== Wins (1) ===
Year	Championship	54 holes	Winning score	Margin	Runner-up
1920	The Open Championship	2 shot deficit	80-80-71-72=303	2 strokes	(Scotland) Sandy Herd

=== Results timeline ===
Tournament	1903	1904	1905	1906	1907	1908	1909
U.S. Open							
The Open Championship	CUT	CUT	CUT	T8	T7	T18	T21

Tournament	1910	1911	1912	1913	1914	1915	1916	1917	1918	1919
U.S. Open								NT	NT	
The Open Championship	3	8	4		T10	NT	NT	NT	NT	NT

Tournament	1920	1921	1922	1923	1924	1925	1926	1927	1928	1929
U.S. Open		T8	6					CUT		
The Open Championship	**1**	5	T2	T6	T6	T28	T21		T18	22

Tournament	1930	1931	1932	1933	1934	1935	1936	1937
U.S. Open		CUT						
The Open Championship	CUT	T36	CUT	CUT		CUT		CUT

Note: Duncan only played in The Open Championship and the U.S. Open.

Win
Top 10
Did not play

NT = No tournament
CUT = missed the half-way cut
"T" indicates a tie for a place

== Team appearances ==
- England–Scotland Professional Match (representing Scotland): 1903 (winners), 1906, 1907, 1909, 1910, 1912 (tie), 1913, 1932, 1934, 1935, 1936, 1937
- Coronation Match (representing the Professionals): 1911 (winners)
- Great Britain vs USA (representing Great Britain): 1921 (winners, captain), 1926 (winners)
- Ryder Cup (representing Great Britain): 1927, 1929 (winners, captain), 1931
