= Walton Heath Golf Club =

Golf club in Surrey, England

- Interactive map of Walton Heath Golf Club
- 51.278°N 0.244°W

Club information
- Location: Surrey, England
- Established: 1903; 123 years ago
- Type: Private
- Tota holes: 36
- Tournaments: U.S. Open Qualifying, Ryder Cup (1981), European Open (1978–91), Senior Open Championship (2011), AIG Women's Open (2023)
- Website: www.waltonheath.com

Old Course
- Designed by: Herbert Fowler
- Par: 72
- Length: 7,406 yd (6,772 m)

New Course
- Designed by: Herbert Fowler
- Par: 72
- Length: 7,199 yd (6,583 m)

Walton Heath Golf Club is a golf club in England, near Walton-on-the-Hill in Surrey, southwest of London. Founded in 1903, the club comprises two 18-hole golf courses, both of which are well known for having heather covering many of the areas of rough.

The Old Course opened in 1904, and (as of 2009) has a championship length of 7,406 yards (6,772 m). The New Course opened as a 9-hole course in 1907 and was extended to 18 holes in 1913; its championship length in 2009 was 7,199 yards (6,583 m). Both were designed by Herbert Fowler, who later designed numerous courses in the United Kingdom and United States.

Walton Heath has had a long association with royalty and politics, with Edward, Prince of Wales having been the club's first captain in 1935, and former United Kingdom Prime Ministers David Lloyd George, Winston Churchill, Bonar Law and Arthur Balfour all having been members. The club has also only ever had four club professionals, including five time British Open champion James Braid who held the post from 1904 until 1950.

Both courses at Walton Heath have been consistently rated in the UK's top 100 courses, with the Old Course also being rated as one of the top 100 in the world.

== Tournaments ==
Walton Heath has been the venue of a number of national amateur tournaments and championships. It has also hosted several high profile professional events including the 1981 Ryder Cup, when it stepped in as a replacement venue after construction at The Belfry had not been completed in time. The club also hosted five editions of the European Open, a European Tour event, between 1978 and 1991.

Since 2005, Walton Heath has been the venue for the U.S. Open European qualifying tournament. In the first year, New Zealander Michael Campbell qualified at Walton Heath, and went on to win the Open at Pinehurst.

Walton Heath hosted The Senior Open Championship, one of the five majors recognised by the Champions Tour, the world's dominant tour for golfers 50 and older, from 21–24 July 2011. The event was eventually won by Russ Cochran. Walton Heath hosted the British Masters on the European Tour in October 2018, won by Eddie Pepperell and the Women's British Open in 2023, won by Lilia Vu.

== Noted Incident ==
Barry Took's 2004 biography of Richard Murdoch, (published by Oxford University Press) relates how the actor and comedian died there, in 1990.

== Scorecard ==
- Old Course

Tee	Rating/Slope	1	2	3	4	5	6	7	8	9	Out	10	11	12	13	14	15	16	17	18	In	Total
Purple	M:75.7 / 135	235	461	289	519	485	440	190	588	400	3,607	442	222	396	529	564	426	535	206	479	3,799	7,406
White	M:72.7 / 131	235	451	289	441	391	427	174	494	400	3,302	399	189	371	512	510	408	510	181	404	3,484	6,786
Green	M:70.6 / 126	195	438	279	430	381	390	158	476	367	3,114	386	168	343	497	485	371	448	155	397	3,250	6,364
Red	M:68.8 / 119 W:74.4 / 135	217	425	274	425	333	390	141	418	355	2,978	327	132	291	457	469	331	433	141	378	2,959	5,937
Blue	M:67.5 / 112 W:72.8 / 129	193	420	220	425	329	329	139	414	344	2,813	325	128	289	455	414	328	428	113	324	2,804	5,617
Par		3	4/5	4	4/5	4	4	3	5	4	35/37	4	3	4	5	5	4	5	3	4	37	72/74

The 2nd & 4th hole are par 5 for ladies.

- New Course

Tee	Rating/Slope	1	2	3	4	5	6	7	8	9	Out	10	11	12	13	14	15	16	17	18	In	Total
Purple	M:74.8 / 131	286	147	425	343	468	183	389	510	484	3,235	202	440	490	570	412	413	607	396	434	3,964	7,199
White	M:72.3 / 125	286	138	419	288	461	171	389	493	455	3,100	189	394	421	497	412	403	511	353	368	3,548	6,648
Green	M:70.4 / 119	280	120	410	250	422	163	374	483	441	2,943	150	374	411	469	400	375	491	310	355	3,335	6,278
Red	M:68.6 / 117 W:74.2 / 132	277	107	393	223	459	133	309	458	423	2,782	138	337	389	443	366	335	477	290	350	3,125	5,907
Par		4	3	4	4	4/5	3	4	5	4/5	35	3	4	4	5	4	4	5	4	4	37	72/74
Blue	M:66.2 / 106 W:71.2 / 120	253	108	376	176	408	126	302	444	385	2,578	133	328	347	402	359	322	478	247	286	2,902	5,480
Par	Blue Tee's Par	4	3	4	3	4	3	4	5	4	34	3	4	4	4	4	4	5	4	4	36	70

The 5th & 9th hole are par 5 for ladies (except for Blue tee) .
