= Sandy Herd =

Scottish golfer (1868–1944)

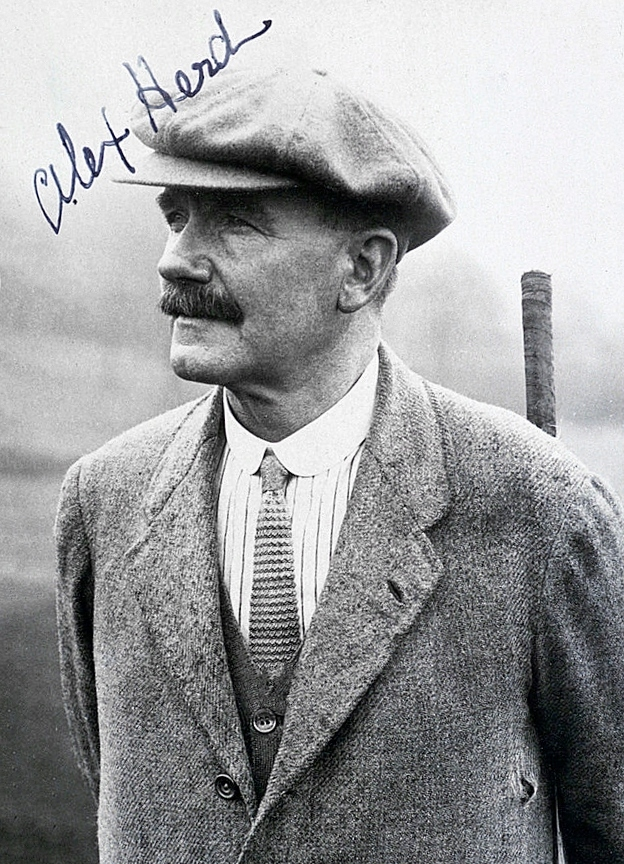
- Herd c. 1920

Personal information
- Full name: Alexander Herd
- Nickname: Sandy
- Nationality: Scotland
- Born: 24 April 1868 St Andrews, Scotland
- Died: 18 February 1944 (aged 75) London, England
- Children: 2 sons, 4 daughters

Career
- Sport: Golf
- Status: Professional
- Professional wins: 11

Best results in major championships (wins: 1)
- Masters Tournament: DNP
- PGA Championship: DNP
- U.S. Open: DNP
- The Open Championship: Won: 1902

Alexander Herd (24 April 1868 – 18 February 1944) was a Scottish professional golfer from St Andrews. He won The Open Championship in 1902 at Hoylake.

== Career ==
Born in St Andrews, Scotland, on 24 April 1868, to a golfing family, Herd had brothers who were also golf professionals. His brother Fred won the 1898 U.S. Open.

Herd was the club professional at Huddersfield Golf Club from 1892 to 1911. He won The Open Championship in 1902 at Hoylake. Herd had a three-shot lead after 54 holes, but nearly let the title slip out of his hands by scoring an 81 in the final round. Harry Vardon and James Braid both had medium length putts at the final hole to force a playoff, but they missed and Herd took the Championship.

Herd was the first Open Champion to use the Haskell rubber-cored ball. In 1920, he became the oldest runner-up in The Open at age 52, which stood for 89 years, until Tom Watson (age 59) in 2009. Herd's appearances in the championship spanned fifty years, the last at age 71 at St Andrews in 1939, but failed to advance from qualifying. He last played in The Open six years earlier in 1933, but twisted an ankle during the first round and had to withdraw; he last made the cut in 1927 and tied for tenth.

Herd also got involved in golf course architect and worked with Alister MacKenzie to create Wakefield Golf Clubs 18-hole course.

== Death ==
Following an operation, Herd died of pneumonia at age 75 in London in 1944.

== Professional wins ==
Note: This list may be incomplete

- 1895 Irish Championship Meeting Professional Tournament
- 1896 Irish Championship Meeting Professional Tournament
- 1901 Irish Championship Meeting Professional Tournament
- 1902 **The Open Championship**
- 1904 Leeds Cup
- 1905 Leeds Cup
- 1906 News of the World Match Play
- 1911 Sphere and Tatler Foursomes Tournament (with James Bradbeer)
- 1923 Roehampton Invitation
- 1925 Hertfordshire Open Championship
- 1926 News of the World Match Play

Major championships are shown in bold.

== Major championships ==
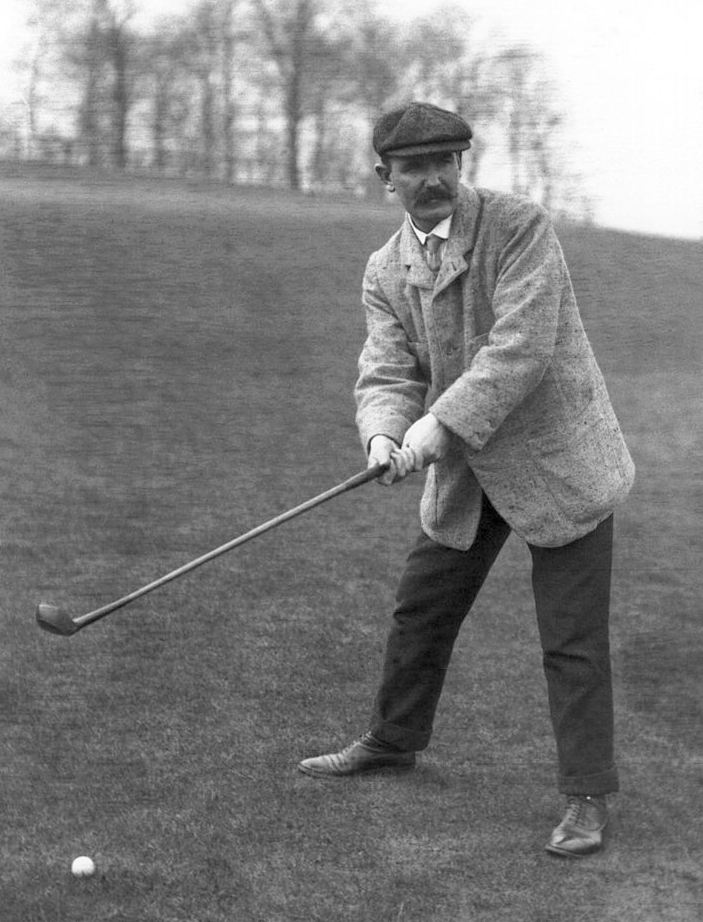
Sandy Herd c. 1900

=== Wins (1) ===
Year	Championship	54 holes	Winning score	Margin	Runners-up
1902	The Open Championship	3 shot lead	77-76-73-81=307	1 stroke	(Scotland) James Braid, (Jersey) Harry Vardon

=== Results timeline ===
Tournament	1885	1886	1887	1888	1889
The Open Championship	WD			8	T15

Tournament	1890	1891	1892	1893	1894	1895	1896	1897	1898	1899
The Open Championship		13	T2	3	8	2	5	5	T17	T16

Tournament	1900	1901	1902	1903	1904	1905	1906	1907	1908	1909
The Open Championship	T10	5	**1**	4	9	15	T19	12	4	T8

Tournament	1910	1911	1912	1913	1914	1915	1916	1917	1918	1919
The Open Championship	2	T3	6	T11	T29	NT	NT	NT	NT	NT

Tournament	1920	1921	1922	1923	1924	1925	1926	1927	1928	1929
The Open Championship	2	T6	T32	T22	T13	T14	T21	T10	CUT	CUT

Tournament	1930	1931	1932	1933
The Open Championship				WD

Note: Herd only played in The Open Championship

Win
Top 10
Did not play

NT = No tournament
CUT = missed the half-way cut
WD = withdrew
"T" indicates a tie for a place

== Team appearances ==
- England–Scotland Professional Match (representing Scotland): 1903 (winners), 1904 (tie), 1905 (tie), 1906, 1907, 1909, 1910, 1912 (tie), 1913, 1932
- Coronation Match (representing the Professionals): 1911 (winners)
- Seniors vs Juniors (representing the Seniors): 1928 (winners)
