= Professional Golfers' Association (Great Britain and Ireland) =

Group of pro golfers in the UK and Ireland

The Professional Golfers' Association (PGA) is the professional body which represents the interests of teaching and club golf professionals in the United Kingdom and Ireland. It was established in 1901 and is based at The Belfry near Birmingham, England. It has a membership of over 7,500 professionals with 1,500 working overseas in more than 70 countries worldwide. Since 2017 the chairman of the board has been Alan White, club professional at Lanark Golf Club.

It is one of many Professional Golfers Associations around the world, but has no territorial designation in its name because it was the first in the world to be founded. For many years it was a combined organisation for club professionals and tournament professionals, but when the two branches of the golfing profession diverged due to the increasing financial rewards available to leading tournament golfers, it split in two. A separate Tournament Division with its headquarters at Wentworth Club was established in the 1970s, and in 1984 this became the independent PGA European Tour.

Its activities include the training of assistant professionals and the continuing education of members; the organisation of golf tournaments, including tournaments for its members such as the PGA Cup, contested between Great Britain and Ireland, and the Ryder Cup organized in conjunction with the Professional Golfers Association of America; the promotion of pro-am golf tournaments and amateur golf, which provide work for its members; and the promotion of junior golf. The PGA, on behalf of the sport of golf, also leads on the development of coach education and training. A full review of the existing coach education structure, following guidance from the quality standards of the UK Coaching Certificate, has led to the establishment of a new, coach-centered education system that meets the needs of coaches and, ultimately, players.

== Regions ==
The PGA is divided into seven regional sections and a dedicated women's section (the WPGA), each of which has its own headquarters and organises its own tournaments:

- East (England)
- Midlands (England)
- North (Northern England, North Wales and the Isle of Man)
- South (Southern England and the Channel Islands)
- West (West of England and South Wales)
- Scotland
- Ireland

The PGA also has an international community for members outside Great Britain and Ireland.

All students who go through the three-year course and succeed in passing the comprehensive examinations at the end of that period are then known as PGA Professionals and are able to teach and work within the golf industry anywhere in the world. The Professional Golfers' Association qualification (Foundation Degree in Professional Golf Studies) is recognised as one of the most prestigious golfing qualifications in the world. For information on how to become a PGA professional see on the official site. A second route into the PGA is via a three-year BA Hons Degree in Applied Golf Management Studies at the University of Birmingham. The AGMS is the first degree of its kind in the UK and is ideal for golfers interested in pursuing senior managerial roles in golf.

== History ==
It was a letter from a North Wales pro in Golf Illustrated on 12 April 1901 that triggered the idea of a professional golfers' association, advocating that pros needed to band together to protect their interests.

Within months the leading players of the day, led by the legendary J.H. Taylor had galvanised enough support to form the London and Counties Professional Golfers' Association. The formation of the association was announced in The Times on 9 August 1901. Arthur Balfour consented to be the president of the association. The association had already announced its first competition, to be held at Tooting Bec Golf Club, Furzedown on 8 October. The event was delayed by a week and was played on 15 October. The Tooting Bec Club donated a "silver challenge cup" to be awarded to the winner. Of the 50 members who entered 46 played, the tournament being over 36 holes of stroke play.

The name of the association was changed at the first AGM on 2 December 1901 to The Professional Golfers' Association. Membership was reported as 59 professionals with 11 assistants and funds of just over £47. The golfing landscape in those early days was very different to the modern game with pros, even the very best like Taylor, Vardon and Braid, earning a living from club duties, club and ball-making, green-keeping, teaching here and there and of course competing in tournaments.

A separate Northern Counties Professional Golfers' Association was formed as a result of a meeting in Leeds on 9 January 1902. At a subsequent meeting, also in Leeds, on 24 March 1902 it was decided that, subject to certain conditions, it would amalgamate with the London-based Professional Golfers' Association and become the northern section of the new enlarged association. The same meeting also agreed to accept an offer from the Leeds Golf Club to host a tournament on 6 May at which the club would provide a prize. This prize became the Leeds Cup.

Administration and organisation of the PGA took a big step forward with the appointment of Commander Roe as secretary in 1934.

He was at the helm for 28 years and under his leadership regulated membership, improved the quality of tournaments, balanced the books and generally endeavoured to promote an increase in the number of people playing the game.

During the 1920s, 1930s and 1940s, the advent of the Ryder Cup, new golf heroes such as Walter Hagen, Gene Sarazen and Henry Cotton, all helped golf's popularity and reinforced the PGA's position as a leading golf organisation.

As the tournament circuit flourished in the late 1960s and 1970s, the PGA Tournament Division went from strength to strength, ultimately going on to form the European Tour in 1984, while the interests of the club professional continued to be represented by the Association at its Belfry headquarters.

During the 1960s and 1970s, the PGA rejuvenated its training and education programme, something it has continued to the present day with assistant professionals now graduating with foundation degrees and honours degrees covering all aspects of golf – from playing and coaching through to golf business and marketing.

The PGA has strong links to Europe as a member of the PGAs of Europe and is committed to growing the game and helping ordinary golfers enjoy the game to its maximum.

== Arms ==
Coat of arms of Professional Golfers' Association
Crest On a helm with a wreath Argent and Vert and Elephant statant Or tusked Argent the housings on its back and forehead Murrey fringed and tasseled Vert its legs ringed Argent burdened with a belfry Argent the roof clock and weathervane Proper the bell Gold. Escutcheon Argent on a chevron Murrey between three pairs of fanes saltirewise Vert the poles Sable as many ancient crowns Or. Motto Honestas Aequitas Integritas

== See also ==
- Golf in Ireland
