= PGA Assistants' Championship =

Tournament information
- Established: 1930
- Course(s): Farleigh Golf Club (2024)
- Format: Stroke play 54 holes

Current champion
- Matty Lamb (2024)

The PGA Assistants' Championship is a golf tournament for golf club assistant professionals. It is held by the British PGA. The first championship was held in 1930 but earlier national tournaments for assistant professionals had been held since 1910.

== History ==
The Championship traces its origin back to the PGA's first major assistants' tournament at Bushey Hall Golf Club in October 1910. The prizes for this tournament were "presented by the proprietors of Perrier Water", the winner receiving 20 guineas (£21) and a gold watch. The event was organised like the News of the World Match Play with regional qualifying over 36 holes and a knock-out stage for the 16 qualifiers. Willie Ritchie, assistant to James Braid at Walton Heath Golf Club won the Southern section qualifying by a clear 7 strokes. Willie Watt was the Scottish qualifier, although there were only four entries, assistants not being common in Scotland at the time. Ritchie and Watt, both from Scotland, met in the final. Watt was 1 up after five holes but lost the next four holes. Ritchie also won the 11th and 13th and eventually won 5&4. Ritchie had played well all year, finishing in a tie for 16th place in the 1910 Open Championship.

Regional qualifying was retained for 1911 but the final stages were decided by 36 holes of stroke play. The Perrier Water tournament continued until World War I. The final stage of the 1914 tournament was cancelled although some of the qualifying competitions had been played. The Perrier Water tournament restarted in 1920 and was won by Percy Alliss, an assistant at Royal Porthcawl Golf Club.

There was no tournament in 1921 but a new event started in 1922. Findlater, Mackie, Todd & Company, wine and spirit merchants, presented a trophy, the Findlater Shield, and prizes of £100 for the tournament. The tournament "which virtually represents the championship of the assistants" was won by Michael Daragon. Alf Perry won the shield in 1924 and 1925. The Findlater Shield continued until 1928.

In 1930 the PGA started the Assistants' Championship. The event was a 36-hole stroke-play event on a single day. The first championship was won by Bill Branch from Henbury Golf Club near Bristol. The 1933 event, planned for July at Hallamshire Golf Club, was cancelled because of a shortage of entries but was replaced by an important new £750 tournament sponsored by the Daily Mirror.

The 1933 Daily Mirror tournament was played from 25 to 28 September at Moor Park Golf Club. The first day consisted of a 36-hole qualifying stage on the High and West courses with the leading 64 playing knock-out match-play on the next three days. Sam King beat Herbert Hardman 3&2 in the final and "gained the unofficial title of 'Champion Assistant'".

The 1934 tournament was played at Wentworth Golf Club and was extended to six days, 28 May to 2 June. The prize money was £800. The 36-hole qualifying stage was over two days on the East and West courses. The match-play stage was played on the East course. The 36-hole final was won by Robert Porter, who beat Dai Rees 3&2 in the final.

In 1935, sectional qualifying was re-introduced. 64 players qualified and the event became a 72-hole stroke-play tournament. The tournament was over 3 days, 30 July to 1 August, with 18 holes on the first two-day and the leading 32 playing 36 holes on the final day. Dai Rees won the tournament with a score of 284 a shot ahead of Bill Cox. Rees won again in 1936, by three strokes from Herbert Osborne.

As winners of major tournaments, Sam King and Dai Rees were excluded from the 1937 tournament, despite still being assistants. After 72 holes Albert Chevalier and Eddie Whitcombe were tied on 289. In the 36-hole playoff the following day Chevalier beat Whitcombe by a shot, scoring 145. Whitcombe had a yard putt at the last to tie but missed.

Bill Laidlaw won the 1938 tournament by 9 strokes from Geoff White and Alan Waters. White, runner-up in 1938, won the 1939 event by 7 strokes from RJ Taylor.

For financial reasons the championship was not played again until 1949. Harry Weetman won the championship by 5 strokes from Peter Alliss and Harry Gould. Weetman won again in 1950, this time by 7 strokes from Dennis Smalldon. The leading 16 players in the 1950 championship qualified for the Gor-Ray match-play tournament at Hartsbourne Golf Club, with prize money of £580. Weetman lost in the quarter-final and the event was won by Brian Shelton.

Having made large losses from the previous two Championships, the P.G.A. initially cancelled the Assistants' Championship for 1951. Because of this the Coombe Hill Golf Club, who had been running a southern section assistants' tournament for a few years, decided to open up the Coombe Hill Assistants' Tournament to all assistants, while extending the event from 36 to 72 holes. This tournament and another held at Fairhaven Golf Club, acted as qualifying events for the Gor-Ray Cup at Hartsbourne which became the official Assistants' Championship, although now a match-play event. Unlike the Coombe Hill Assistants' Tournament, the Gor-Ray Cup was restricted to P.G.A. members. In 1952 and 1953 the Coombe Hill Assistants' Tournament was the only qualifying event, with the leading 16 and ties qualifying for the Gor-Ray Cup. From 1954 the Gor-Ray Cup became a 72-hole stroke-play event. In 1968 the assistants event was changed to an age-restricted event, the Gor-Ray Under-24 Championship. This new event was reduced to 54 holes in 1969 and was not contested again.

Since the championship restarted in 1981 it has been sponsored by Dorset Foods (1981–1982), Footjoy (1983–1984), Wilson Sporting Goods. (1985), Peugeot Talbot (1986–1987), Peugeot (1988–1992), Standard Life (1994), Reebok (1995–97), Maxfli (1999–2001), Powerade (2004), Powerade in association with FootJoy (2005–2014), Galvin Green (2015–2017), Birdietime (2019) and Coca-Cola (2020–2024).

== Winners ==
| Year | Champion | Venue | Score |
Coca-Cola PGA Assistants' Championship
| 2024 | Matty Lamb | Farleigh Golf Club | 200 |
| 2023 | Lewis Scott | Farleigh Golf Club | 202 |
| 2022 | James Walker | Royal Cromer Golf Club | 212 |
| 2021 | Michael Farrier-Twist | Farleigh Golf Club | 201 ^{PO} |
| 2020 | Michael Bullen | Oakmere Golf Club | 212 |
Birdietime PGA Assistants' Championship
| 2019 | Michael Bullen | Pleasington Golf Club | 205 ^{PO} |
PGA Assistants' Championship
| 2018 | Lee Corfield | Farleigh Golf Club | 209 |
Galvin Green PGA Assistants' Championship
| 2017 | Matthew Fieldsend | Coxmoor Golf Club | 212 |
| 2016 | Mathew Webb | Little Aston Golf Club | 204 |
| 2015 | Jack Harrison | Coventry Golf Club | 203 |
Powerade PGA Assistants' Championship
| 2014 | Gareth Davies | Coventry Golf Club | 207 ^{PO} |
| 2013 | Matthew Cort | Coventry Golf Club | 203 |
| 2012 | Matthew Cort | East Sussex National Golf Club | 211 |
| 2011 | Matthew Cort | East Sussex National Golf Club | 211 |
| 2010 | Guy Woodman | East Sussex National Golf Club | 208 |
| 2009 | Jon Lupton | London Golf Club | 206 |
| 2008 | Guy Woodman | London Golf Club | 210 |
| 2007 | Jon Lupton | London Golf Club | 213 |
| 2006 | Brett Taylor | London Golf Club | 206 |
| 2005 | Matthew Tottey | London Golf Club | 211 |
| 2004 | Matthew Ford | Coventry Golf Club | 208 |
PGA Assistants' Championship
| 2003 | Matthew Tottey | St Annes Old Links Golf Club | 204 |
| 2002 | David Orr | St Annes Old Links Golf Club | 271 |
Maxfli PGA Assistants' Championship
| 2001 | Craig Goodfellow | St Annes Old Links Golf Club | 207 |
| 2000 | Thor Andersen | St Annes Old Links Golf Club | 273 |
| 1999 | Darren Parker | Bearwood Lakes Golf Club | 274 |
PGA Assistants' Championship
| 1998 | Andrew Raitt | Bearwood Lakes Golf Club | 280 |
Reebok PGA Assistants' Championship
| 1997 | Peter Sefton | Heron's Reach Golf Club | 273 |
| 1996 | Stephen Purves | Moor Allerton Golf Club | 281 |
| 1995 | Ian Sparkes | Warwickshire Golf Club | 284 |
Standard Life PGA Assistants' Championship
| 1994 | Mark Plummer | Foxhills Golf Club | 278 |
PGA Assistants' Championship
| 1993 | Craig Everett | Oaklands Golf Club | 280 |
Peugeot PGA Assistants' Championship
| 1992 | Paul Mayo | East Sussex National Golf Club | 285 |
| 1991 | Simon Wood | Wentworth Golf Club | 288 |
| 1990 | Tony Ashton | Hillside Golf Club | 213 |
| 1989 | Colin Brooks | Hillside Golf Club | 291 |
| 1988 | John Oates | Coventry Golf Club | 284 |
Peugeot Talbot PGA Assistants' Championship
| 1987 | John Hawksworth | Coombe Hill Golf Club | 282 |
| 1986 | John Brennand | Sand Moor Golf Club | 280 |
Wilson PGA Assistants' Championship
| 1985 | Gary Coles | Coombe Hill Golf Club | 284 |
Footjoy PGA Assistants' Championship
| 1984 | Gary Weir | Coombe Hill Golf Club | 286 |
| 1983 | Barry Lane | Coombe Hill Golf Club | 287 |
Dorset Foods PGA Assistants' Matchplay Championship
| 1982 | Hogan Stott | Henbury Golf Club | 4&3 |
| 1981 | Ian Grant | Henbury Golf Club | 3&1 |
1968–80: No tournament
Gor-Ray Cup
| 1967 | Maurice Bembridge | Coventry Golf Club | 277 |
| 1966 | Vince Hood | Harborne Golf Club | 277 |
| 1965 | Tony Jacklin | Hartsbourne Golf Club | 283 |
| 1964 | Malcolm Gregson | Hartsbourne Golf Club | 216 |
| 1963 | George Will | Hartsbourne Golf Club | 282 |
| 1962 | Ross Whitehead | Hartsbourne Golf Club | 277 |
| 1961 | Lionel Platts | Hartsbourne Golf Club | 277 |
| 1960 | Derek Nash | Hartsbourne Golf Club | 280 |
| 1959 | Peter Gill | Hartsbourne Golf Club | 282 |
| 1958 | Tony Grubb | Hartsbourne Golf Club | 285 |
| 1957 | George Low | Hartsbourne Golf Club | 280 |
| 1956 | Neil Coles | Hartsbourne Golf Club | 277 |
| 1955 | Dave Thomas | Hartsbourne Golf Club | 282 |
| 1954 | Geoffrey Hunt | Hartsbourne Golf Club | 284 |
| 1953 | Bernard Hunt | Hartsbourne Golf Club | 2&1 |
| 1952 | Peter Alliss | Hartsbourne Golf Club | 5&4 |
| 1951 | Alex King | Hartsbourne Golf Club | 9&7 |
PGA Assistants' Championship
| 1950 | Harry Weetman | Worsley Golf Club | 287 |
| 1949 | Harry Weetman | Sandwell Park Golf Club | 295 |
1940–48: No tournament
Daily Mirror Assistants' Tournament
| 1939 | Geoff White | Notts Golf Club | 290 |
| 1938 | Bill Laidlaw | Blackpool North Shore Golf Club | 289 |
| 1937 | Albert Chevalier | Fulwell Golf Club | 289 ^{PO} |
| 1936 | Dai Rees | Moseley Golf Club | 278 |
| 1935 | Dai Rees | St Annes Old Links Golf Club | 284 |
| 1934 | Robert Porter | Wentworth Golf Club | 3&2 |
| 1933 | Sam King | Moor Park Golf Club | 3&2 |
PGA Assistants' Championship
| 1932 | Gwyn James | South Herts Golf Club | 139 ^{PO} |
| 1931 | Walter Hammond | Hendon Golf Club | 145 |
| 1930 | Bill Branch | Moseley Golf Club | 144 |
Assistant Professionals' Tournament
| 1929 | Edward Rimmer | Fulwell Golf Club | 145 |
Findlater Shield
| 1928 | Doug Brown | Stoke Poges Golf Club | 147 |
| 1927 | Jack Smith | Oxhey Golf Club | 144 |
| 1926 | Walter Thomas | St George's Hill Golf Club | 146 ^{PO} |
| 1925 | Alf Perry | Moor Park Golf Club | 151 |
| 1924 | Alf Perry | Broxbourne Golf Club | 155 ^{PO} |
| 1923 | Jack Taylor | Bushey Hall Golf Club | 144 |
| 1922 | Michael Daragon | Northwood Golf Club | 150 |
1921: No tournament
Perrier Water Assistant Professionals' Tournament
| 1920 | Percy Alliss | Porters Park Golf Club | 149 |
1914-19: No tournament
| 1913 | Fred Jewell | South Herts Golf Club | 142 |
| 1912 | William Brown | West Middlesex Golf Club | 150 |
| 1911 | Charles Macey | Bexhill Golf Club | 155 |
| 1910 | Willie Ritchie | Bushey Hall Golf Club | 5&4 |

- Since 2003 the championship has been decided over 54 holes. In 2001, 1990, 1969 and 1964 it was also decided over 54 holes.
- In 1924 Perry (77) beat Tom King, Jr. (81) in an 18-hole playoff. In 1926 Thomas (73) beat Don Curtis (82) in an 18-hole playoff. In 1932 James (73) beat Sam King (74) in an 18-hole playoff. In 1937 Chevalier (145) beat Eddie Whitcombe (146) in a 36-hole playoff. In 2014 Davies beat Charles Wilson at the first hole of a sudden-death playoff. In 2019 Bullen beat Billy Hemstock at the second hole of a sudden-death playoff.
