= 1912 News of the World Match Play =

Tenth News of the World Match Play golf tournament

Coordinates: 51°23′17″N 0°37′52″W

Tournament information
- Dates: 2–4 October 1912
- Location: Sunningdale, Berkshire, England
- Course: Sunningdale Golf Club
- Organised by: The PGA
- Format: Match play – 18 holes (Final 36 holes)

Statistics
- Field: 32 players
- Prize fund: £400
- Winner's share: £100

Champion
- (Jersey) Harry Vardon
- def. Ted Ray 1 up

Location in England

The 1912 News of the World Match Play was the tenth News of the World Match Play tournament. It was played from Wednesday 2 to Friday 4 October at Sunningdale Golf Club. 32 players competed in a straight knock-out competition, with each match contested over 18 holes, except for the final which was over 36 holes. The winner received £100 out of a total prize fund of £400. Harry Vardon defeated Ted Ray by 1 hole in the final to win the tournament.

== Qualification ==
Entry was restricted to members of the Professional Golfers' Association (PGA). Qualification was by a series of 36-hole stroke-play competitions; one for each of the eight PGA sections. The Southern section had 12 qualifiers, the Northern section 7, the Midland section 5, the Scottish, Welsh and Western sections 2 and the Eastern and Irish sections 1. Because of the large number of entries in the Southern section, two events were run with 6 qualifiers at each venue. In the event of a tie for places there was a playoff.

Qualifying events:

- 4 July Scottish section at North Berwick: Robert Thomson won by 6 strokes on 146. The Dunlop Cup was played the following day.
- 11 July Western section at Parkstone: Ernest Whitcombe won by 4 strokes on 144.
- 24 July Eastern section at Cambridge: Allan Gow won by 3 strokes on 151. He was the leading Eastern section player in the open competition, finishing third behind James Batley and Anthony Kettley who tied on 149.
- 4 September Northern section at Halifax: Walter Hambleton won by 2 on 163.
- 11 September Southern section at Hanger Hill: George Duncan won by 9 strokes on 143. Anthony Kettley and Jack White tied on 155. They played off the following day with White scoring 77 and Kettley 81.
- 11 September Southern section at Sundridge Park: Ted Ray won by 4 strokes on 150. Eric Bannister and James Bradbeer tied on 159. They played off the following day with Bradbeer scoring 80 and Bannister 81.
- 11 September Welsh section at Tenby: Peter Rainford won by 2 strokes on 155.
- 19 September Irish section at Portmarnock: Michael Moran and Pat O'Hara tied on 159. They played off the following day. Moran scored 77, O'Hara 82.
- 25 September Midland section at Seacroft, Skegness: George Buckle, Harry Cawsey tied on 150. James Adwick, George Tuck and Tom Williamson tied on 153 for two places and played off the next day. Williamson 71 and Tuck 74 qualified with Adwick scoring 82. The event was also the 1912 Midland Professional Championship.

The qualifiers were:

- Scottish section: Robert Thomson, Willie Watt
- Western section: Ernest Foord, Ernest Whitcombe
- Eastern section: Allan Gow
- Northern section: Edward Cheal, Arthur Day, James Edmundson, Walter Hambleton, Charles Roberts, Edward Smith, Sam Whiting
- Southern section at Hanger Hill Golf Club: George Duncan, Claude Gray, Ernest Jones, Willie Ritchie, Jack White, Reg Wilson
- Southern section at Sundridge Park Golf Club: James Bradbeer, Sandy Herd, Ted Ray, Jack Rowe, J.H. Taylor, Harry Vardon
- Welsh section: George Gadd, Peter Rainford
- Irish section: Michael Moran
- Midland section: George Buckle, Harry Cawsey, George Tuck, Edward Veness, Tom Williamson

== Format ==
The format was unchanged. Matches were over 18 holes except for the final which was over 36 holes. Extra holes were played in the event of a tied match. Two rounds were played on the first day, two more on the second day with the final on the third day.

== Results ==
First round 2 October
(England) George Gadd	4&3
(Scotland) Jack White
(Scotland) George Duncan
(Jersey) Harry Vardon	4&3
(Ireland) James Edmundson
(Scotland) Sandy Herd	20h
(England) Arthur Day	3&2
(England) Peter Rainford
(England) James Bradbeer
(England) Ernest Jones	2&1
(England) Sam Whiting	3&1
(England) Edward Cheal
(England) J.H. Taylor
(England) Jack Rowe	1up
(England) Reg Wilson	1up
(England) Tom Williamson
(Scotland) Willie Watt	7&5
(Scotland) Willie Ritchie
(England) George Tuck
(Jersey) Ted Ray	4&2
(England) Claude Gray
(England) Walter Hambleton	23h
(England) Edward Veness
(England) Ernest Whitcombe	7&6
(England) George Buckle	3&2
(England) Charles Roberts
(Ireland) Michael Moran
(England) Harry Cawsey	3&2
(England) Edward Smith
(Scotland) Robert Thomson	2&1
(England) Ernest Foord	4&3
(Scotland) Allan Gow

Second round 2 October
(England) George Gadd
(Jersey) Harry Vardon	6&4
(Scotland) Sandy Herd	5&4
(England) Arthur Day
(England) Ernest Jones	1up
(England) Sam Whiting
(England) Jack Rowe
(England) Reg Wilson	4&3
(Scotland) Willie Watt
(Jersey) Ted Ray	19h
(England) Walter Hambleton	3&1
(England) Ernest Whitcombe
(England) George Buckle
(England) Harry Cawsey	3&2
(Scotland) Robert Thomson
(England) Ernest Foord	20h

Third round 3 October
(Jersey) Harry Vardon	1up
(Scotland) Sandy Herd
(England) Ernest Jones
(England) Reg Wilson	4&3
(Jersey) Ted Ray	5&4
(England) Walter Hambleton
(England) Harry Cawsey	2&1
(England) Ernest Foord

Semi-finals; 3 October
(Jersey) Harry Vardon	7&5
(England) Reg Wilson
(Jersey) Ted Ray	7&6
(England) Harry Cawsey

Final; 4 October
(Jersey) Harry Vardon	1up
(Jersey) Ted Ray

== Prize money ==
The winner received £100 and a gold medal, but the runner-up now received £40 and a silver medal, losing semi-finalists £20 and a bronze medal, losing quarter-finalists £15, second round losers £10 and first round losers £5.
