= 1910 News of the World Match Play =

Eighth News of the World Match Play golf tournament

Coordinates: 51°23′17″N 0°37′52″W

Tournament information
- Dates: 4–6 October 1910
- Location: Sunningdale, Berkshire, England
- Course: Sunningdale Golf Club
- Organised by: The PGA
- Format: Match play – 18 holes (Final 36 holes)

Statistics
- Field: 32 players
- Prize fund: £240
- Winner's share: £100

Champion
- (England) James Sherlock
- def. George Duncan 8 & 6

Location in England

The 1910 News of the World Match Play was the eighth News of the World Match Play tournament. It was played from Tuesday 4 to Thursday 6 October at Sunningdale Golf Club. 32 players competed in a straight knock-out competition, with each match contested over 18 holes, except for the final which was over 36 holes. The winner received £100 out of a total prize fund of £240. James Sherlock defeated George Duncan 8 & 6 in the final to win the tournament.

== Qualification ==
Entry was restricted to members of the Professional Golfers' Association (PGA). Qualification was by a series of 36-hole stroke-play competitions; one for each of the eight PGA sections. The Southern section had 13 qualifiers, the Northern section 7, the Midland section 4, the Scottish, Welsh and Western sections 2 and the Eastern and Irish sections 1. Compared to 1909 one entry was allocated to the new Eastern section while the Western and Welsh sections were increased from one to two. The Scottish section was reduced to two and the Irish section to one. In the event of a tie for places there was a playoff.

The qualifiers were:

- Eastern section: Ernest Riseborough
- Irish section: Hugh McNeill
- Midland section: Eric Bannister, William Jeffries, Roland Lewis, George Tuck
- Northern section: James Douglas Edgar, Horace Fulford, Jack Gaudin, Sandy Herd, Cyril Hughes, Ted Ray, Charles Roberts
- Southern section: Tom Ball, George Duncan, Ernest Gaudin, Rowland Jones, Fred Leach, Charles Mayo, Willie Park Jr., Fred Robson, James Sherlock, James Souter, J.H. Taylor, Harry Vardon, Tom Vardon
- Scottish section: John Hunter, Robert Thomson
- Western section: Ernest Foord, Ernest Whitcombe
- Welsh section: Alfred Matthews, Sam Whiting

== Format ==
The format was unchanged. Matches were over 18 holes except for the final which was over 36 holes. Extra holes were played in the event of a tied match. Two rounds were played on the first day, two more on the second day with the final on the third day.

== Results ==
First round 4 October
(England) Ernest Whitcombe
(England) James Sherlock	8&6
(Scotland) Sandy Herd	2&1
(Jersey) Ted Ray
(Jersey) Jack Gaudin
(England) Ernest Foord	3&2
(Scotland) Robert Thomson	4&3
(Scotland) James Souter
(England) George Tuck
(England) Alfred Matthews	1up
(Jersey) Tom Vardon
(England) Eric Bannister	4&2
(Jersey) Ernest Gaudin	1up
(England) Fred Leach
(England) Sam Whiting	4&3
(England) Horace Fulford
(Ireland) Hugh McNeill
(England) Cyril Hughes	2up
(England) J. Douglas Edgar	20h
(England) Rowland Jones
(England) Charles Mayo
(England) Fred Robson	3&2
(England) J.H. Taylor	4&3
(England) William Jeffries
(England) Ernest Riseborough	3&2
(Scotland) John Hunter
(England) Charles Roberts
(Scotland) George Duncan	8&6
(England) Tom Ball	7&6
(England) Rolnad Lewis
(Scotland) Willie Park Jr.
(Jersey) Harry Vardon	6&5

Second round 4 October
(England) James Sherlock	3&1
(Scotland) Sandy Herd
(England) Ernest Foord	2&1
(Scotland) Robert Thomson
(England) Alfred Matthews
(England) Eric Bannister	2&1
(Jersey) Ernest Gaudin
(England) Sam Whiting	1up
(England) Cyril Hughes	2&1
(England) J. Douglas Edgar
(England) Fred Robson
(England) J.H. Taylor	19h
(England) Ernest Riseborough
(Scotland) George Duncan	5&4
(England) Tom Ball	20h
(Jersey) Harry Vardon

Third round 5 October
(England) James Sherlock	6&5
(England) Ernest Foord
(England) Eric Bannister	1up
(England) Sam Whiting
(England) Cyril Hughes	3&2
(England) J.H. Taylor
(Scotland) George Duncan	3&1
(England) Tom Ball

Semi-finals; 5 October
(England) James Sherlock	4&3
(England) Eric Bannister
(England) Cyril Hughes
(Scotland) George Duncan	19h

Final; 6 October
(England) James Sherlock	8&6
(Scotland) George Duncan

== Prize money ==
The winner received £100 and a gold medal, the runner-up £30 and a silver medal, the losing semi-finalists £15 and a bronze medal, while the third round losers received £10 and the second round losers received £5.
