= Ash, Sevenoaks District =

Village in Kent, England

Coordinates: 51.356°N 0.297°E

Ash
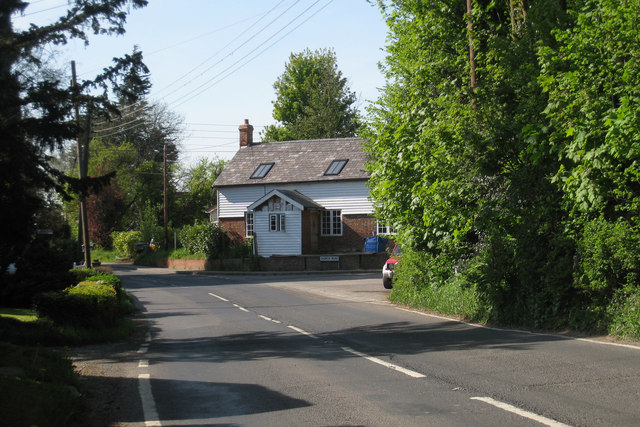

- Location within Kent
- OS grid reference: TQ600644
- Civil parish: Ash-cum-Ridley
- District: Sevenoaks
- Shire county: Kent
- Region: South East
- Country: England
- Sovereign state: United Kingdom
- Post town: Sevenoaks
- Postcode district: TN15
- Police: Kent
- Fire: Kent
- Ambulance: South East Coast
- UK Parliament: Tonbridge

Ash is a small village and former civil parish located in the Sevenoaks district in Kent. It shares the parish of Ash-cum-Ridley with the nearby villages of Ridley and New Ash Green. The London Golf Club is located in the village, which hosted the European Open on the PGA European Tour in 2008 and 2009. In 1951 the parish had a population of 1017.

Ash and Ridley were formerly separate parishes. Both were part of Dartford Rural District and Axstane Hundred.

== History ==
The name "Ash" comes from ash trees. On 1 April 1955 the parish was abolished and become parts of the parishes of Ash cum Ridley and West Kingsdown.
