= 1903 Open Championship =

Coordinates: 55.502°N 4.619°W

Tournament information
- Dates: 10–11 June 1903
- Location: Prestwick, South Ayrshire, Scotland
- Course: Prestwick Golf Club

Statistics
- Field: 124 players, 59 after cut
- Cut: 169
- Prize fund: £115
- Winner's share: £50

Champion
- (Jersey) Harry Vardon
- 300

Location in Scotland
Location in South Ayrshire, Scotland

The 1903 Open Championship was the 43rd Open Championship, held 10–11 June at Prestwick Golf Club in Prestwick, South Ayrshire, Scotland. Harry Vardon won the Championship for the fourth time, six strokes ahead of runner-up Tom Vardon, his younger brother.

All entries played 36 holes on the first day with all those within 19 strokes of the leader making the cut and playing 36 holes on the final day, with the additional provision that the final day's field had to contain at least 32 professionals.

After the opening round on Wednesday morning, Harry Vardon and defending champion Sandy Herd co-led at 73, three strokes ahead of the rest of the field. In the afternoon, Herd had a poor 83 and Harry Vardon's 77 gave him a four shot lead on 150 ahead of Andrew Scott, despite a seven at the 17th hole. The cut was at 169 and 59 advanced to the final two rounds. Rowland Jones was initially disqualified but later reinstated.

In the third round on Thursday morning, Harry Vardon scored 72, having reached the turn in 34. This gave him a seven-stroke lead over Jack White, with Herd and Tom Vardon ten shots behind. In the afternoon, White took a seven at the third hole which effectively gave Harry Vardon the title. Playing cautiously, he eventually finished with a 78. Tom Vardon had the best final round score of 74 and moved into second place ahead of White.

== Round summaries ==
=== First round ===
Wednesday, 10 June 1903 (morning)

| Place | Player | Score |
|---|---|---|
| T1 | (Scotland) Sandy Herd | 73 |
| T1 | (Jersey) Harry Vardon | 73 |
| T3 | (Jersey) Tom Vardon | 76 |
| T3 | (England) Tom Williamson | 76 |
| T5 | (Scotland) James Braid | 77 |
| T5 | (England) Ernest Gray | 77 |
| T5 | (Scotland) John Hunter | 77 |
| T5 | (Scotland) Andrew Scott | 77 |
| T5 | (Scotland) Jack White | 77 |
| T10 | (Scotland) Robert Andrew (a) | 78 |
| T10 | (Scotland) Willie Fernie | 78 |
| T10 | (Scotland) James Hepburn | 78 |
| T10 | (Scotland) James Kinnell | 78 |
| T10 | (Scotland) Willie Park Jr. | 78 |

=== Second round ===
Wednesday, 10 June 1903 (afternoon)

| Place | Player | Score |
|---|---|---|
| 1 | (Jersey) Harry Vardon | 73-77=150 |
| 2 | (Scotland) Andrew Scott | 77-77=154 |
| T3 | (Scotland) Willie Hunter Sr. | 81-74=155 |
| T3 | (Scotland) Jack White | 77-78=155 |
| T5 | (Scotland) James Braid | 77-79=156 |
| T5 | (Scotland) Sandy Herd | 73-83=156 |
| T5 | (Scotland) John Hunter | 77-79=156 |
| T5 | (England) Tom Williamson | 76-80=156 |
| 9 | (Jersey) Tom Vardon | 76-81=157 |
| T10 | (England) George Cawsey | 80-78=158 |
| T10 | (England) Bill Leaver | 79-79=158 |

=== Third round ===
Thursday, 11 June 1903 (morning)

| Place | Player | Score |
|---|---|---|
| 1 | (Jersey) Harry Vardon | 73-77-72=222 |
| 2 | (Scotland) Jack White | 77-78-74=229 |
| T3 | (Jersey) Tom Vardon | 76-81-75=232 |
| T3 | (Scotland) Sandy Herd | 73-83-76=232 |
| T5 | (England) George Cawsey | 80-78-76=234 |
| T5 | (Scotland) Willie Hunter Sr. | 81-74-79=234 |
| T7 | (Scotland) James Braid | 77-79-79=235 |
| T7 | (Scotland) Willie Fernie | 78-81-76=235 |
| T7 | (England) Bill Leaver | 79-79-77=235 |
| T7 | (England) Tom Williamson | 76-80-79=235 |

=== Final round ===
Thursday, 11 June 1903 (afternoon)

| Place | Player | Score | Money (£) |
|---|---|---|---|
| 1 | (Jersey) Harry Vardon | 73-77-72-78=300 | 50 |
| 2 | (Jersey) Tom Vardon | 76-81-75-74=306 | 25 |
| 3 | (Scotland) Jack White | 77-78-74-79=308 | 15 |
| 4 | (Scotland) Sandy Herd | 73-83-76-77=309 | 10 |
| 5 | (Scotland) James Braid | 77-79-79-75=310 | 7 10s |
| T6 | (Scotland) Andrew Scott | 77-77-83-77=314 | 3 15s |
| T6 | (Scotland) Robert Thomson | 83-78-77-76=314 | 3 15s |
| 8 | (England) Bill Leaver | 79-79-77-80=315 | 0 |
| T9 | (England) George Cawsey | 80-78-76-82=316 | 0 |
| T9 | (England) J.H. Taylor | 80-82-78-76=316 | 0 |
