= Dunlop Tournament =

Dunlop Tournament may refer a number of different golf tournaments sponsored by Dunlop:

- Dunlop Tournament (United Kingdom) (1949–1961), previously called the Dunlop-Southport Tournament
- Dunlop Tournament (Japan) (1969–1976), subsequently renamed the Diamond Cup Golf Tournament
- Dunlop-Southport Tournament, in Britain, from 1931 to 1948
- Dunlop-Metropolitan Tournament, in Britain, from 1934 to 1939
- Dunlop Masters, in Britain, from 1946 to 1983
- Dunlop South African Masters, from 1960 to 1977
- Dunlop International, in Australia, from 1965 to 1972
- Dunlop Phoenix Tournament, in Japan, since 1974
- Dunlop International Open, in Japan, from 1977 to 1987
  - becoming the Dunlop Open from 1988 to 1995
- Dunlop Srixon Fukushima Open, in Japan, since 2014
- Irish Dunlop Tournament, in Ireland, until 1980
- Lusaka Open, in Zambia
  - sponsored as the Lusaka Dunlop Open in 1970 and 1971
- Malaysian Dunlop Masters, in Malaysia, during the 1970s
- Rhodesian Dunlop Masters, in Rhodesia (now Zimbabwe), from 1969 to 1978

== See also ==
- Dunlop Cup (disambiguation)
- Dunlop Wizard
