= Ash-cum-Ridley =

Civil parish in Kent, England

Coordinates: 51°22′N 0°18′E

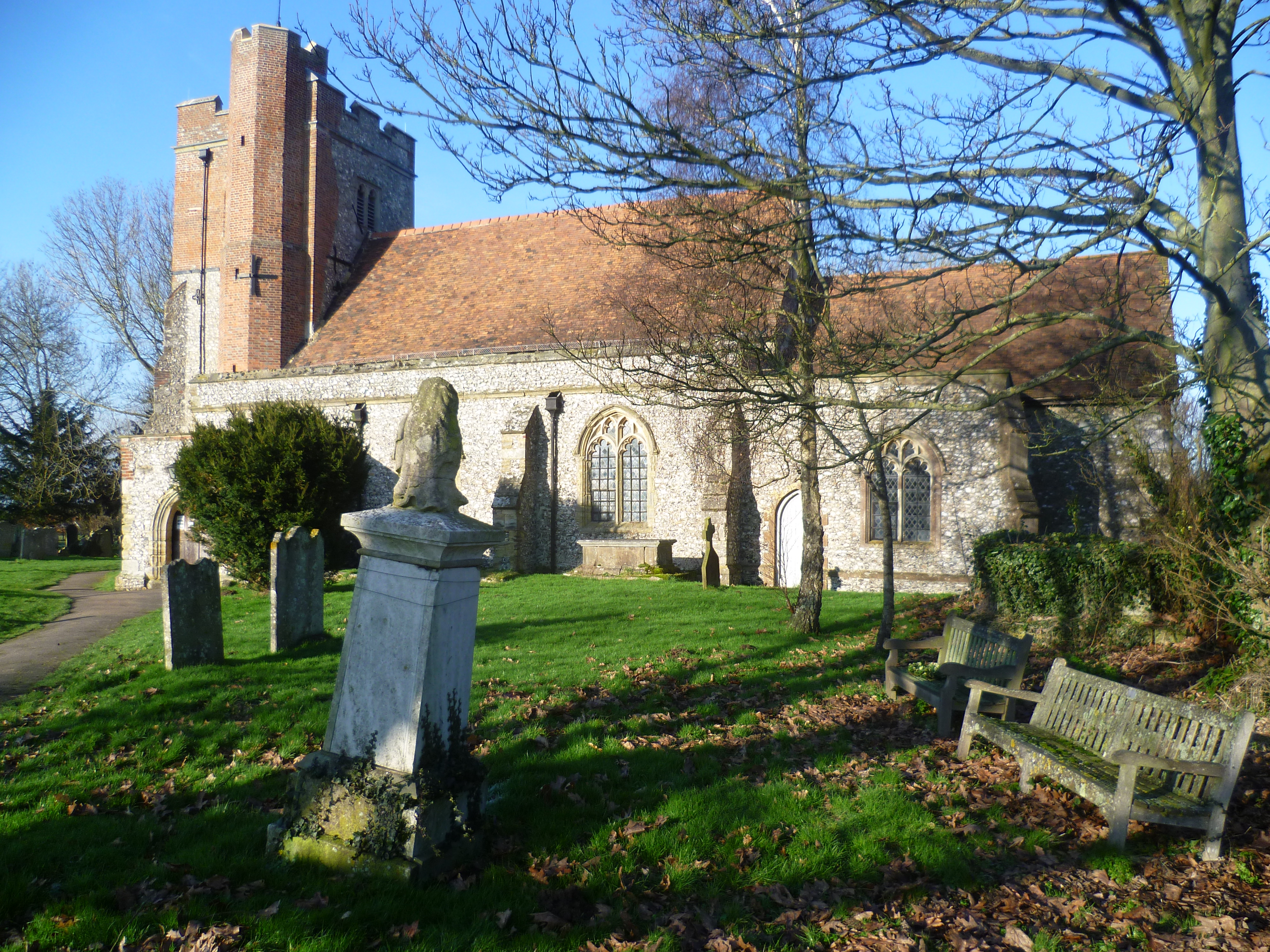
- St Peter and St Paul's Church, Ash

- Location within Kent
- Population: 6,641 (2011 census)
- Civil parish: Ash-cum-Ridley
- District: Sevenoaks
- Shire county: Kent
- Region: South East
- Country: England
- Sovereign state: United Kingdom
- Police: Kent
- Fire: Kent
- Ambulance: South East Coast

Ash-cum-Ridley is a civil parish in the Sevenoaks district of Kent, England. According to the 2001 census the parish had a population of 7,070, reducing to 6,641 at the 2011 Census.

The parish includes four main settlements:

- Ash is a small village including the London Golf Club.
- New Ash Green, a planned settlement
- Hodsoll Street is a hamlet including the former Green Man pub which was destroyed by fire in 2021
- Ridley, another small village.

New Street is another hamlet, east of Ridley and north of Hodsoll Street; OS grid reference TQ6264.

Ash and Ridley were formerly separate parishes. Both were part of Dartford Rural District and Axstane Hundred.

== Gallery ==
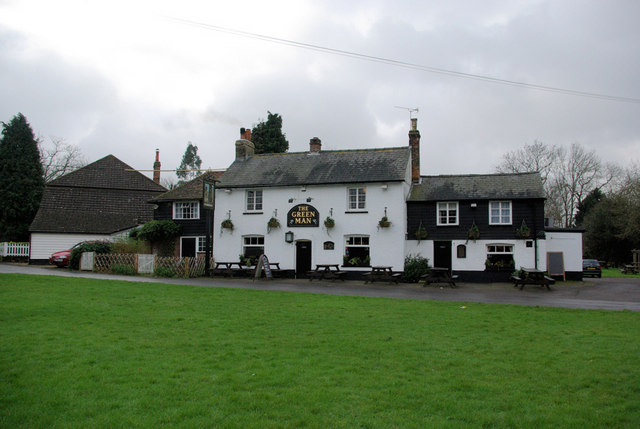
The Green Man before the 2021 fire, Hodsoll Street

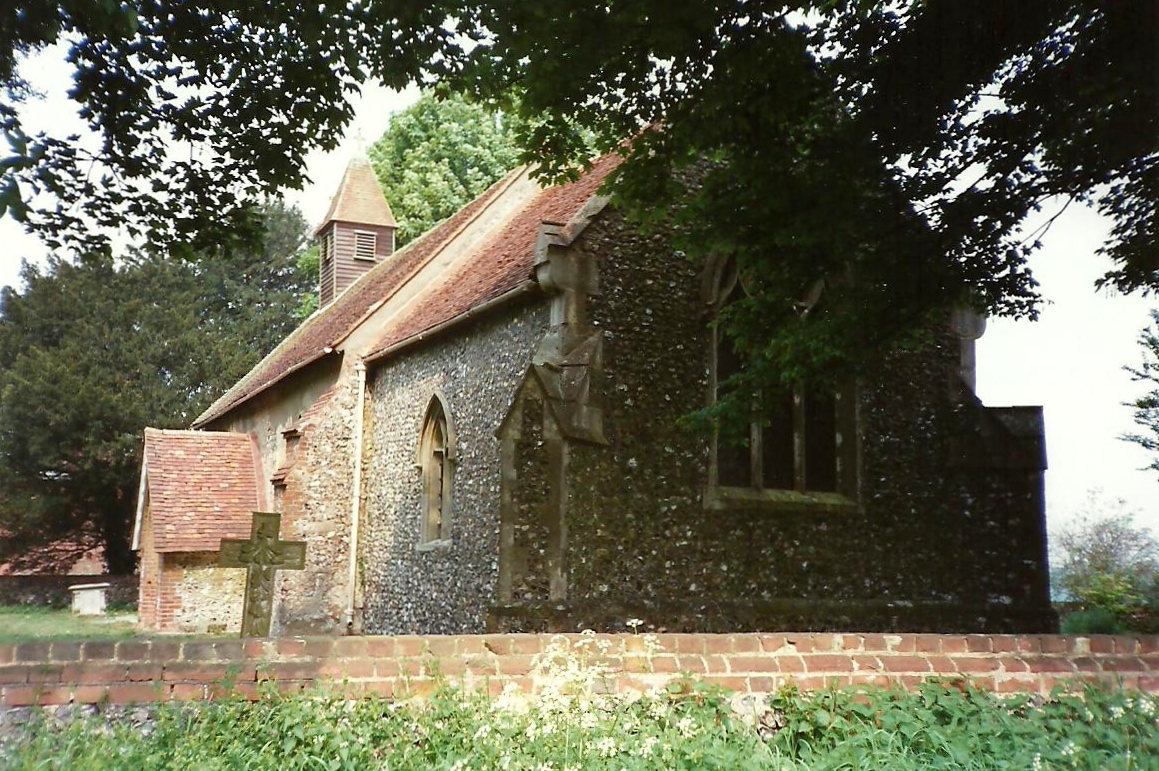
St Peter's Church, Ridley

== See also ==
- Listed buildings in Ash-cum-Ridley
