= Bushey Hall (disambiguation) =

Bushey Hall was the name of two historic buildings in Hertfordshire.

Bushey Hall may also refer to:

- Bushey Hall School, former name of The Grange Academy
- Bushey Hall Golf Club
