= London club =

London club may refer to:

- London Club, an international group of creditors
- London Clubs International, a British gambling company
- London Golf Club, a golf club in Ash, Kent
- a club on the List of London's gentlemen's clubs
