= Andrew Scott (golfer) =

Scottish golfer

Personal information
- Full name: Andrew Herd Scott
- Nationality: Scotland
- Born: Scotland

Career
- Sport: Golf
- Status: Professional

Best results in major championships
- Masters Tournament: DNP
- PGA Championship: DNP
- U.S. Open: DNP
- The Open Championship: T6: 1903

Andrew Herd Scott was a Scottish professional golfer. Scott tied for seventh place with fellow countrymen Ben Sayers and David Brown in the 1896 Open Championship.

== Early life ==
Scott was born in Scotland circa 1870.

== Golf career ==
=== 1896 Open Championship ===
The 1896 Open Championship was the 36th Open Championship, held 10–11 and 13 June at Muirfield in Gullane, East Lothian, Scotland. Harry Vardon won the Championship after a playoff against J.H. Taylor. Scott's result in the tournament was very commendable. He carded rounds of 83-84-77-80=324. His third and fourth round total of 157 was four shots better than what the great J.H. Taylor scored in those rounds. If not for the difficulties he encountered in the first two rounds he certainly would have finished much higher on the final leaderboard.

Just five days before his 73rd birthday, Old Tom Morris played in his last Open Championship, 36 years after finishing second in the first Championship. At 72 years, 360 days he remains the oldest known competitor in the Open Championship.
