= Ernest Foord =

English golfer (1883–1941)

Personal information
- Full name: Ernest Edward Foord
- Nationality: England
- Born: 3 June 1883 Berrow, Burnham-on-Sea, Somerset, England
- Died: 28 October 1941 (aged 58) Flint, Michigan, U.S.

Career
- Sport: Golf
- Turned professional: 1900

Best results in major championships
- Masters Tournament: DNP
- PGA Championship: DNP
- U.S. Open: DNP
- The Open Championship: T19: 1914

Ernest Edward Foord (3 June 1883 – 28 October 1941) was an English professional golfer. He emigrated to America in 1916 and was known there as Ernest or Ernie Ford.

== Golf career in England ==
Foord was the son of Walter Foord, the professional at Burnham & Berrow Golf Club. He replaced his father as professional and remained there from 1900 to 1916. Foord was a regular competitor in the Open Championship from 1901 to 1914. His best finish was tied for 19th place in 1914. After the Western section of the PGA was formed in 1909 he reached the final stages of the News of the World Match Play in 1909, 1910 and 1912. In both 1910 and 1912 he won two matches to reach the quarter-final stage.

== Golf career in the United States ==
Foord emigrated to the United States in 1916. In America he was known as Ernest or Ernie Ford. He was the professional at Plum Hollow Country Club and at Oakland Hills Country Club from 1924 to 1930. He moved to Flint, Michigan in 1930 when he lived until his death.

== Personal life ==
Foord married Ada Gard in England in 1909. He died in 1941, Ada in 1985. They had a son Stanley Ernest, born in 1909, who was also a golfer. Foord had a younger brother, Fred (1889–1945), who was a professional golfer and also emigrated to America. Fred also used the Ford spelling in America.

== Results in major championships ==
Tournament	1901	1902	1903	1904	1905	1906	1907	1908	1909	1910	1911	1912	1913	1914
The Open Championship	CUT		T33	WD	T24	T30	WD	WD	T21	T28	WD			T19

Note: Foord only played in The Open Championship.

Did not play

WD = withdrew
CUT = missed the half-way cut
"T" indicates a tie for a place
