= Willie Ritchie (golfer) =

Scottish golfer (1884–1966)

Personal information
- Full name: William Leggat Ritchie
- Nationality: Scotland
- Born: 1884 Aberdeen, Scotland
- Died: 12 February 1966 (aged 81) Croydon, Surrey, England

Career
- Sport: Golf
- Status: Professional
- Professional wins: 1

Best results in major championships
- Masters Tournament: DNP
- PGA Championship: DNP
- U.S. Open: DNP
- The Open Championship: T16: 1910

William Leggat Ritchie (1884 – 12 February 1966) was a Scottish professional golfer. His most successful year was 1910 when he tied for 16th place in the Open Championship and won the Perrier Water Assistant Professionals' Tournament.

== Early life ==
Ritchie was born in 1884 in Aberdeen, Scotland.

== Golf career ==
Ritchie's best season was 1910 while he was an assistant to James Braid at Walton Heath Golf Club. The opening day of the Open Championship was abandoned because of rain but, when play resumed the following day, Ritchie had rounds of 78 and 74 and was tied for 4th place at the end of the day. Rounds of 82 and 79 on the final day left him tied for 16th place. Later in the year Ritchie won the first Perrier Water Assistant Professionals' Tournament at Bushey Hall Golf Club. The prizes for this tournament were "presented by the proprietors of Perrier Water", the winner receiving 20 guineas (£21) and a gold watch. The event was organised like the News of the World Match Play with regional qualifying over 36 holes and a knock-out stage for the 16 qualifiers. Ritchie won the Southern section qualifying by a clear 7 strokes. Ritchie and Willie Watt, the Scottish qualifier, met in the final. Watt was 1 up after five holes but lost the next four holes. Ritchie also won the 11th and 13th and eventually won 5&4.

Following his successful season he became the professional at Worplesdon Golf Club in 1911. In 1922 he moved to Addington Golf Club. From 1935 he was at Selsdon Park Golf Club.

== Death ==
Ritchie died on 12 February 1966, aged 81. At the time he was living in Addiscombe near Croydon in south London.

== Tournament wins ==
- 1910 Perrier Water Assistant Professionals' Tournament

== Results in major championships ==
Tournament	1910	1911	1912	1913	1914	1915	1916	1917	1918	1919
The Open Championship	T16	CUT		WD	60	NT	NT	NT	NT	NT

Tournament	1920	1921	1922	1923	1924	1925	1926	1927	1928	1929
The Open Championship	T29	72	70	37						

Tournament	1930	1931	1932
The Open Championship			CUT

Note: Ritchie only played in The Open Championship.

Did not play

NT = No tournament
WD = withdrew
CUT = missed the half-way cut
"T" indicates a tie for a place

== Team appearances ==
- England–Scotland Professional Match (representing Scotland): 1913
