= Willie Watt (golfer) =

Scottish golfer (1889–1954)

Personal information
- Full name: William Martin Watt
- Nationality: Scotland
- Born: 1889 Dunbar, East Lothian, Scotland
- Died: 26 May 1954 (aged 64) Epsom, Surrey, England

Career
- Sport: Golf
- Status: Professional
- Professional wins: 1

Best results in major championships
- Masters Tournament: DNP
- PGA Championship: DNP
- U.S. Open: DNP
- The Open Championship: T8: 1923

William Martin Watt (1889 – 26 May 1954) was a Scottish professional golfer. He won the Scottish Professional Championship in 1912 and tied for 8th place in the 1923 Open Championship.

== Early life ==
Watt was born in 1889 in Dunbar, East Lothian, Scotland. He had four older golfing brothers: Jim, John, Robert and Davie.

== Golf career ==
Watt enjoyed some success in the Scottish Professional Championship before World War I. He won the championship in 1912, was runner-up in 1908 and 1914 and was third in 1909, 1911 and 1913. His success in 1912 was at Dunbar, where he won by 5 strokes from his brother Davie, winning the first prize of £25. He tied with Robert Thomson in 1908 but lost the 36-hole playoff by 7 strokes.

The opening day of the 1910 Open Championship was abandoned because of rain but, when play resumed the following day, Watt started with a 74 and was tied for second place at the end of the first round. His second round of 82 dropped him down the field. He eventually finished tied for 32nd place. Later in 1910 Watt was runner-up in the first Perrier Water Assistant Professionals' Tournament at Bushey Hall Golf Club. The prizes for this tournament were "presented by the proprietors of Perrier Water", the winner receiving 20 guineas (£21) and a gold watch. The event was organised like the News of the World Match Play with regional qualifying over 36 holes and a knock-out stage for the 16 qualifiers. Watt was the Scottish qualifier, although there were only 4 entries. He met Willie Ritchie in the final. Ritchie had won the Southern section qualifying by a clear 7 strokes. Watt was 1 up after five holes but lost the next four holes. Ritchie also won the 11th and 13th and eventually won 5&4.

As well as winning the Scottish Professional Championship in 1912, Watt was also runner-up in the Dunlop Cup at North Berwick, 5 strokes behind Robert Thomson, and taking the £5 second prize. Watt reached the semi-final of the 1913 News of the World Match Play at Walton Heath Golf Club where he lost 3&2 to James Braid.

In late 1914 Watt moved south, becoming the professional at the new Woodcote Park Golf Club near Epsom, Surrey. He remained there until he retired in 1947. He enjoyed some success in the early 1920s and finished tied for 8th place in the 1923 Open Championship.

== Death ==
Watt died in May 1954 aged 64. At the time he was living in Epsom, Surrey.

== Tournament wins ==
- 1912 Scottish Professional Championship

== Results in major championships ==
Tournament	1910	1911	1912	1913	1914	1915	1916	1917	1918	1919
The Open Championship	T32	T21	34		33	NT	NT	NT	NT	NT

Tournament	1920	1921	1922	1923	1924	1925	1926	1927	1928	1929
The Open Championship	T56	T19	T28	T8			CUT	CUT	T37	55

Tournament	1930	1931	1932	1933
The Open Championship				CUT

Note: Watt only played in The Open Championship.

Top 10
Did not play

NT = No tournament
CUT = missed the half-way cut
"T" indicates a tie for a place

== Team appearances ==
- England–Scotland Professional Match (representing Scotland): 1912, 1913
