= RAF Bushey Hall =

Former RAF station

RAF Bushey Hall USAAF Station 341
- Near Watford, Hertfordshire in England
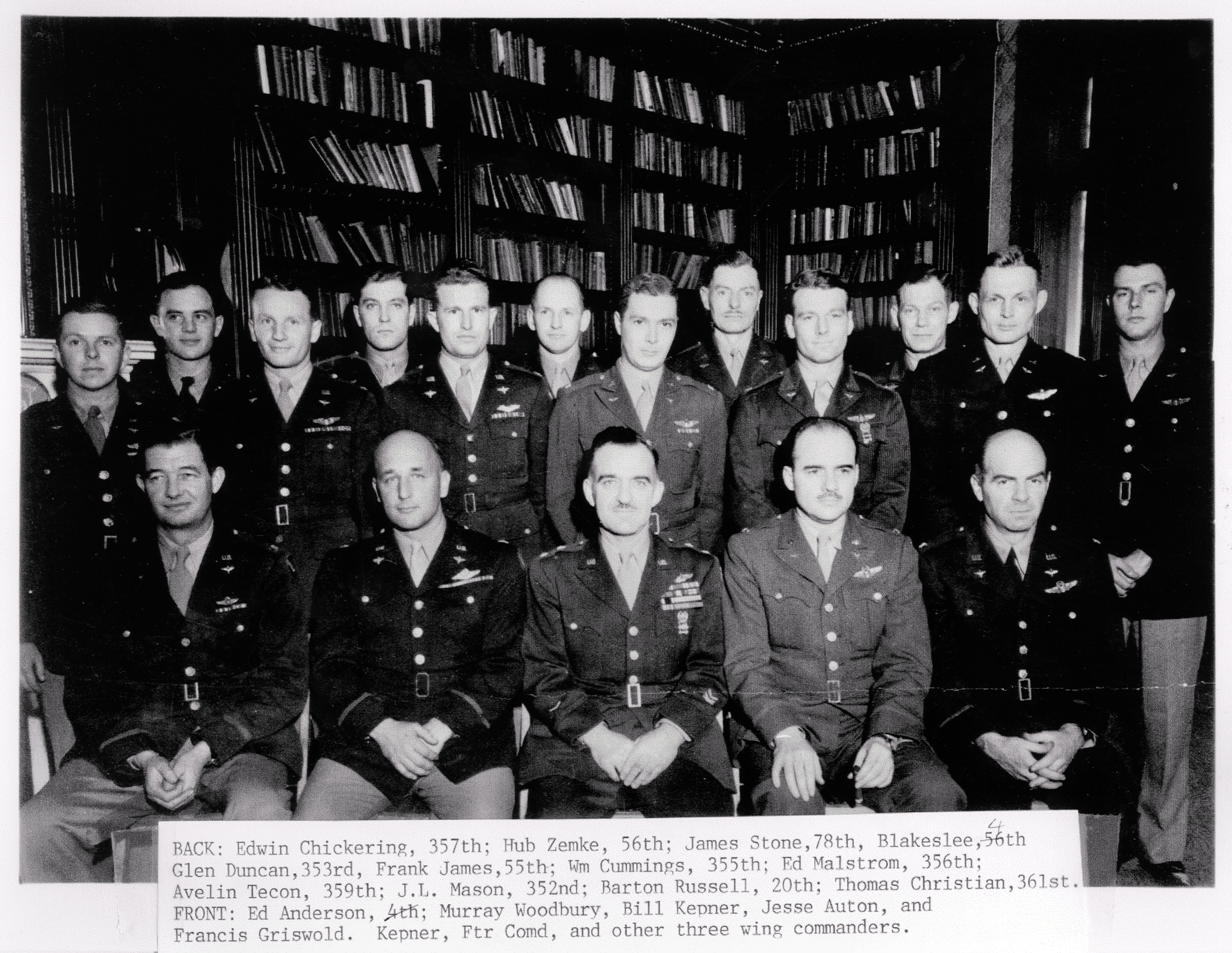
- Commanding officers of the Fighter Groups of the 8th Air Force in 1944

Site information
- Type: Royal Air Force station - Military Headquarters
- Owner: Air Ministry
- Controlled by: United States Army Air Forces; United States Air Force

Location
- Shown within Hertfordshire RAF Bushey Hall (the United Kingdom)
- Coordinates: 51.6584°N 0.3731°W

Site history
- Built: 1893
- In use: 1942–1955
- Battles/wars: European Theatre of World War II; Air Offensive, Europe July 1942 – May 1945; Cold War

Garrison information
- Garrison: Eighth Air Force; Third Air Force

Royal Air Force Bushey Hall or more simply RAF Bushey Hall is a former Second World War non-flying Royal Air Force station located 6.7 miles (10.8 km) south west of St Albans, Hertfordshire and 8.8 miles (14.2 km) north east of Uxbridge, London, England.

== History ==
It was established at a private golf club and was used as a headquarters facility for the United States Army Air Forces Eighth Air Force in the United Kingdom. It was situated close to its Royal Air Force counterpart at RAF Bentley Priory, near Stanmore. It was also known as USAAF station 341.

During the war the facility was the headquarters for the United States Army Air Forces Eighth Air Force VIII Fighter Command (1942–45). Its name frequently led to the site being confused with Army Air Force Station 586 at Bushy Park in south-west London, which was the Headquarters of United States Strategic Air Forces (USSTAF) during 1944 and 1945.

It was the site of London Central Elementary High School, a United States Department of Defense Dependents School, from 1962 to 1971.

In 1955, the facility was returned to civil control. It was Bushey Hall Golf Club and Lincolnsfields Children's Centre.

== See also ==
- List of former Royal Air Force stations
