= Listed buildings in Ash-cum-Ridley =

Civil Parish in Kent, England

Ash-cum-Ridley is a village and civil parish in the Sevenoaks District of Kent, England. It contains one grade I, four grade II* and 27 grade II listed buildings that are recorded in the National Heritage List for England.

This list is based on the information retrieved online from Historic England.

== Key ==
Grade	Criteria
I	Buildings that are of exceptional interest
II*	Particularly important buildings of more than special interest
II	Buildings that are of special interest

== Listing ==
Name	Grade	Location	Type	Completed (Note: The date given is the date used by Historic England as significant for the initial building or that of an important part in the structure's description.)	Date designated	Grid ref. (Note: The grid reference is based on the British national grid reference system, sometimes known as OSGB36, used by the Ordnance Survey.) Geo-coordinates	Notes	Entry number (Note: The "List Entry Number" is a unique number assigned to each listed building and scheduled monument by Historic England.)	Image	Wikidata
Ash-cum-ridley War Memorial	II	TN15 7HD			31 October 2016	TQ5996564413; 51°21′23″N 0°17′46″E		1439172	Upload Photo	Q66478080
The White Swan Public House	II	Ash Road			22 October 1982	TQ5983364509; 51°21′26″N 0°17′39″E		1235102	The White Swan Public House More images	Q26528456
Johnson's Farmhouse	II	Butchers Lane, West Yoke			22 October 1982	TQ5990665847; 51°22′09″N 0°17′45″E		1235103	Upload Photo	Q26528457
Oliver's Farmhouse	II	Butchers Lane, West Yoke			22 October 1982	TQ5987965828; 51°22′08″N 0°17′43″E		1235104	Upload Photo	Q26528458
Corner Cottage	II	Chapel Wood Road, West Yoke			22 October 1982	TQ5999465432; 51°21′56″N 0°17′49″E		1275794	Upload Photo	Q26565354
Ash Manor	II*	Church Lane, New Ash Green			1 August 1952	TQ6021464541; 51°21′26″N 0°17′59″E		1216772	Upload Photo	Q17545510
Garden Wall to South East of Ash Manor Running Down to Road	II	Church Lane, New Ash Green			22 October 1982	TQ6022164519; 51°21′26″N 0°17′59″E		1235107	Upload Photo	Q26528460
Monument to Lock Family in Churchyard of Parish Church of Saint Peter and Saint Paul	II	Church Lane, New Ash Green			22 October 1982	TQ6017364542; 51°21′27″N 0°17′57″E		1275795	Upload Photo	Q26565355
Parish Church of Saint Peter and Saint Paul	I	Church Lane, New Ash Green			1 June 1967	TQ6018264562; 51°21′27″N 0°17′57″E	W tower and chancel C13, turret of the tower cased in C18 red brick, three-bay aisled nave and chancel rebuilt in C15	1235106	Parish Church of Saint Peter and Saint Paul More images	Q17529857
Horns Lodge	II	Fairseat Lane			22 October 1982	TQ6136562994; 51°20′35″N 0°18′56″E		1275707	Upload Photo	Q26565269
Greenfields	II	Hodsoll Street			22 October 1982	TQ6258362986; 51°20′34″N 0°19′59″E		1275796	Upload Photo	Q26565356
Hodsoll House	II	Hodsoll Street			22 October 1982	TQ6255262985; 51°20′34″N 0°19′57″E		1235108	Upload Photo	Q26528461
Holywell Cottage	II	Hodsoll Street			22 October 1982	TQ6258063031; 51°20′35″N 0°19′58″E		1216660	Upload Photo	Q26511427
Holywell Farmhouse	II	Hodsoll Street			22 October 1982	TQ6252663069; 51°20′36″N 0°19′56″E		1235109	Upload Photo	Q26528462
Leaders	II	Hodsoll Street			22 October 1982	TQ6240062959; 51°20′33″N 0°19′49″E		1216920	Upload Photo	Q26511671
Main Building to Holywell Park Old People's Home	II	Hodsoll Street			4 December 1981	TQ6258663150; 51°20′39″N 0°19′59″E		1216799	Upload Photo	Q26511555
Peach Cottage and Plum Cottage	II	Hodsoll Street			22 October 1982	TQ6253363025; 51°20′35″N 0°19′56″E		1216798	Upload Photo	Q26511554
The Goslings	II	Hodsoll Street			22 October 1982	TQ6284862508; 51°20′18″N 0°20′11″E		1275798	Upload Photo	Q26565358
The Old Malt House	II	Malthouse Road			22 October 1982	TQ6079062988; 51°20′36″N 0°18′26″E		1275666	Upload Photo	Q26565230
Black Cottage Farmhouse	II	New Street Road			22 October 1982	TQ6296363984; 51°21′06″N 0°20′20″E		1216661	Black Cottage Farmhouse More images	Q26511428
The Manor House (audley Estates Ltd Sales Office)	II	North Ash Road, New Ash Green			1 June 1967	TQ6059765294; 51°21′50″N 0°18′20″E		1216976	Upload Photo	Q26511723
Berry's Maple	II	Pease Hill			22 October 1982	TQ6094363820; 51°21′02″N 0°18′35″E		1216662	Upload Photo	Q26511430
Church of Saint Peter	II*	Rectory Road, Ridley			1 June 1967	TQ6161463901; 51°21′04″N 0°19′10″E		1216987	Church of Saint Peter More images	Q17545514
Granary to East of Ridley Court Farmhouse	II	Rectory Road, Ridley			22 October 1982	TQ6162963927; 51°21′05″N 0°19′11″E		1216664	Upload Photo	Q26511432
Ridley Court Farmhouse	II	Rectory Road, Ridley			1 August 1952	TQ6157363909; 51°21′05″N 0°19′08″E		1216663	Upload Photo	Q26511431
South Ash Manor	II*	South Ash Road, Stansted, Tonbridge And Malling			1 August 1952	TQ5958863161; 51°20′42″N 0°17′24″E		1236122	Upload Photo	Q17545901
South Ash Manor	II*	South Ash Road			1 June 1967	TQ5959863165; 51°20′43″N 0°17′25″E		1275615	Upload Photo	Q17545901
South Ash Manor Farm Cottages	II	3 and 4, South Ash Road			1 June 1967	TQ5962663265; 51°20′46″N 0°17′26″E		1217024	Upload Photo	Q26511766
Attwood Place	II	The Street, Ash			1 June 1967	TQ6005964324; 51°21′20″N 0°17′50″E		1216668	Upload Photo	Q26511435
The Old Rectory	II	The Street, Ash			22 October 1982	TQ6017064349; 51°21′20″N 0°17′56″E		1217029	Upload Photo	Q26511771
Threeways and Wallace Terrace	II	The Street, Ash			22 October 1982	TQ6023463910; 51°21′06″N 0°17′59″E		1216670	Upload Photo	Q26511437
West Yoke Farmhouse	II	West Yoke			7 August 2001	TQ5950465612; 51°22′02″N 0°17′24″E		1389383	Upload Photo	Q26668821

== See also ==
- Grade I listed buildings in Kent
- Grade II* listed buildings in Kent

== Sources ==
- Newman, John (2012) [1969], Kent: West and the Weald, The Buildings of England, New Haven and London: Yale University Press, ISBN 978-0-300-18509-6
