= 1910 Open Championship =

Coordinates: 56.343°N 2.803°W

Tournament information
- Dates: 21–24 June 1910
- Location: St Andrews, Scotland
- Course: Old Course at St Andrews

Statistics
- Length: 6,489 yards (5,934 m)
- Field: 210 players, 64 after cut
- Cut: 161
- Prize fund: £125
- Winner's share: £50

Champion
- (Scotland) James Braid
- 299

Location in Scotland
Location in Fife, Scotland

The 1910 Open Championship was the 50th Open Championship, held 21–24 June at the Old Course at St Andrews, Fife, Scotland. James Braid won the championship for the fifth time, four strokes ahead of Sandy Herd, the 1902 champion.

There was no qualifying competition; all 210 entries played 18 holes in pairs on the first two days with the top sixty and ties advancing for the final 36 holes on the third day. Prize money was increased by £10 with the addition of £5 prizes for seventh and eighth places.

Play started on Tuesday, 21 June, but an early afternoon thunderstorm flooded many of the greens and play was cancelled. It was decided that all existing scores would not count and that the Championship would start again on Wednesday and extend to Friday.

After the first round, George Duncan led with 73, a stroke ahead of Willie Watt and Robert Thomson. The leaderboard changed significantly during the second round on Thursday with Duncan shooting 77, while Watt and Thomson took 82 and 85. The midway leader was Willie Smith, then a professional in Mexico City, who shot 71 for 148. Braid was a stroke back on 149 with Duncan third on 150. The cut was at 161 or better and 64 players advanced for the final day.

Duncan's 71 on Friday morning gave him the 54-hole lead, two strokes ahead of Braid with Herd and Ted Ray a further four shots behind. Duncan's 83 in the afternoon dropped him to third place and gave Braid a comfortable victory with Herd second. Smith's second 80 of the day left him in a disappointing tie for fifth place.

== Round summaries ==
=== First round ===
Tuesday, 21 June 1910
Wednesday, 22 June 1910

A thunderstorm on Tuesday afternoon caused flooding; all scores for the day were thrown out and play was restarted on Wednesday.

Place	Player	Score
1	(Scotland) George Duncan	73
T2	(Scotland) Willie Watt	74
T2	(Scotland) Robert Thomson	74
T4	(England) Fred Robson	75
T4	(England) Herbert Riseborough	75
T6	(Scotland) James Braid	76
T6	(Jersey) Ted Ray	76
T6	(England) J.H. Taylor	76
T9	(England) Albert Bellworthy	77
T9	(England) Fred Collins	77
T9	(Scotland) George Daniel	77
T9	(England) Harold Frostick	77
T9	(Scotland) Willie Hunter Sr.	77
T9	(Ireland) Michael Moran	77
T9	(Jersey) Thomas Renouf	77
T9	(England) James Sherlock	77
T9	(Scotland) Willie Smith	77
T9	(Jersey) Harry Vardon	77
T9	(Jersey) Tom Vardon	77

=== Second round ===
Thursday, 23 June 1910

Place	Player	Score
1	(Scotland) Willie Smith	77-71=148
2	(Scotland) James Braid	76-73=149
3	(Scotland) George Duncan	73-77=150
T4	(Jersey) Ernest Gaudin	78-74=152
T4	(Scotland) Sandy Herd	78-74=152
T4	(Ireland) Michael Moran	77-75=152
T4	(Scotland) Willie Ritchie	78-74=152
T8	(Scotland) James Kinnell	79-74=153
T8	(Jersey) Ted Ray	76-77=153
T8	(Jersey) Thomas Renouf	77-76=153

=== Third round ===
Friday, 24 June 1910 (morning)

Place	Player	Score
1	(Scotland) George Duncan	73-77-71=221
2	(Scotland) James Braid	76-73-74=223
T3	(Scotland) Sandy Herd	78-74-75=227
T3	(Jersey) Ted Ray	76-77-74=227
T5	(Jersey) Ernest Gaudin	78-74-76=228
T5	(Jersey) Thomas Renouf	77-76-75=228
T5	(Scotland) Willie Smith	77-71-80=228
8	(Scotland) Laurie Ayton, Snr	78-76-75=229
9	(Scotland) James Kinnell	79-74-77=230
10	(Ireland) Michael Moran	77-75-79=231

=== Final round ===
Friday, 24 June 1910 (afternoon)

Place	Player	Score	Money (£)
1	(Scotland) James Braid	76-73-74-76=299	50
2	(Scotland) Sandy Herd	78-74-75-76=303	25
3	(Scotland) George Duncan	73-77-71-83=304	15
4	(Scotland) Laurie Ayton, Snr	78-76-75-77=306	10
T5	(Jersey) Ted Ray	76-77-74-81=308	6; 13s 4d
T5	(England) Fred Robson	75-80-77-76=308	6; 13s 4d
T5	(Scotland) Willie Smith	77-71-80-80=308	6; 13s 4d
T8	(Jersey) Ernest Gaudin	78-74-76-81=309	1; 5s
T8	(Scotland) James Kinnell	79-74-77-79=309	1; 5s
T8	(Jersey) Thomas Renouf	77-76-75-81=309	1; 5s
T8	(Scotland) Donald Ross	78-79-75-77=309	1; 5s
