= Thomas Hennell =

British artist

- Born: 16 April 1903; Ridley, Kent, England
- Died: 5 November 1945 (Aged 42); Surabaya, Java
- Education: Regent Street Polytechnic
- Known for: Painting, writing
- Cause of death: Killed in action

Thomas Hennell (16 April 1903 – 1945) was a British artist and writer who specialised in illustrations and essays on the subject of the British countryside. He was an official war artist during the Second World War and was killed while serving in Indonesia in November 1945.

== Early life ==
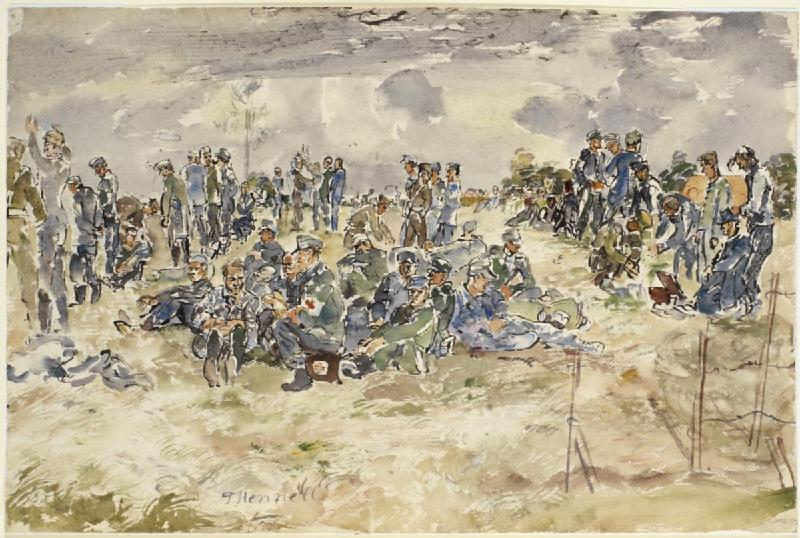
German Prisoners - being assembled and searched at Thiberville (Art. IWM ART LD4625)

Hennell was born in Ridley, Kent in 1903, the second son of the Rev. Harold Barclay Hennell and Ethel Mary Hennell. He attended primary school in Broadstairs and then secondary school at Bradfield College, Berkshire before studying art at Regent Street Polytechnic. Hennell qualified as a teacher in 1928 and taught for some years at the Kingswood School, Bath and at the King's School, Bruton in Somerset. Whilst at college Hennell had begun travelling around the British countryside to work on essays and illustrations of rural landscapes. He had a nervous breakdown from 1932–35 and was detained first at the Maudsley Hospital. When he recovered he returned to the work of recording scenes of rural crafts and craftsmen at work. He worked closely with H J Massingham, illustrating books by him and others. Edward Bawden, a fellow artist, encouraged Hennell to write The Witnesses, an account of his mental illness.

== Artist Biography ==
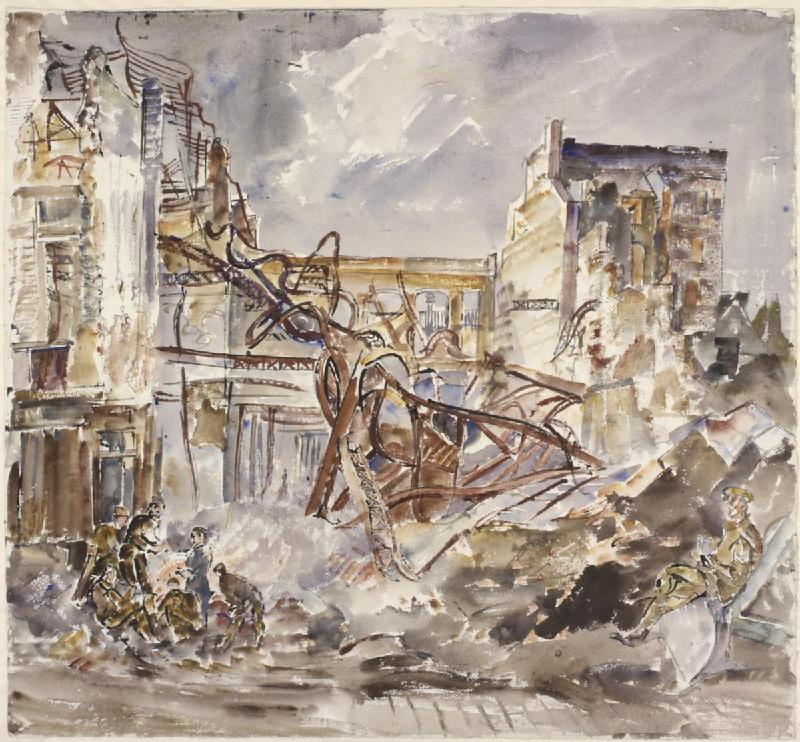
Galeries de Paris, Boulogne (1944)(Art.IWM ART LD4743)

At the outbreak of war in 1939 Hennell wrote to the War Artists' Advisory Committee, WAAC, offering his services as an artist. He worked for the Pilgrim Trust in 1940, and the Ministry of Information in 1941, producing watercolours of rural crafts and agriculture in Kent, Dorset, Berkshire and Worcestershire. In March 1941 one of his paintings was purchased by WAAC and, later, he was given a commission to make drawings of harvest work. In 1943 Hennell was named as a full-time salaried war artist and sent to replace Eric Ravilious in Iceland. He painted in Iceland throughout the second half of 1943 before going to the northeast of England in January 1944 to paint maritime topics. In May 1944 Hennell went to Portsmouth to record the preparations for D-Day, which he took part in. Throughout the invasion he spent two months with the Canadian First Army as they moved through the north of France. At this time he painted scenes of German prisoners of war and also the launch sites of V-1 flying bombs. In October 1944 he was transferred to a Royal Navy unit, attached with the rank of Lieutenant in the Royal Naval Volunteer Reserve, with whom he recorded the Allied advance into Belgium and Holland.

Hennell returned to England for surgery before starting an assignment with the Air Ministry in the Far East. He arrived in Burma in June 1945 and was based with an RAF unit near Rangoon as the Japanese retreated. Hennell completed a painting of an Allied victory parade in the city featuring Lord Mountbatten and also painted Indian units building an airstrip in the jungle. From Rangoon, Hennell travelled by train to Calcutta, then sailed to Colombo. From there, he sailed aboard HMS Hunter to Penang and witnessed the retaking of the town and, later, the surrender of Singapore. After Singapore, Hennell went to Indonesia and was at Surabaya in Java when he was captured by Indonesian nationalist fighters in November 1945 and was presumed to have been killed shortly thereafter. As a naval officer who has no known grave, he is commemorated on the Chatham Naval Memorial in Kent.

== Legacy ==
Hennell's art works centred on the countryside, and in particular hedging, threshing, baling and the clearing of orchards. Hennell was a member of The Royal Watercolour Society and exhibited in the New English Art Club. A number of his works are held by the Imperial War Museum, the Tate and are also part of the Ministry of Defence art collection.

== Bibliography ==
- 1934: Change in the Farm
- 1936: Poems - with wood-engravings by Eric Ravilious
- 1938: The Witnesses
- 1943: British Craftsmen
- 1947: The Countryman at Work
- 1947: Six Poems - privately printed at Tunbridge Wells School of Arts and Crafts

Hennell provided illustrations for

- 1939: A Countryman's Journey by H.J Massingham,
- 1939: Country Relics by H.J Massingham,
- 1940: Chiltern Country by H.J Massingham,
- 1943: English Farming by J.Russell,
- 1943: The Land is Yours by C.H Warren,
- 1944: Miles from Anywhere by C.H Warren,
- 1944: Farms and Fields by C.S & C.S. Orwin
- 1946: The Natural Order – Essays in the Return to Husbandry by H.J Massingham (with Philip Mairet, Lord Northbourne, the Earl of Portsmouth)
- 1946-49: Recording Britain, Volumes 1,3 & 4 by A.Palmer (Editor),
- 1948: The Windmills of Thomas Hennell by Alan Stoyel.
