= Davie Watt =

Scottish professional golfer

Personal information
- Full name: David Paterson Watt
- Nationality: Scotland
- Born: 1885 Dunbar, East Lothian, Scotland
- Died: 25 April 1917 (aged 31) Kent, England

Career
- Sport: Golf
- Status: Professional
- Professional wins: 1

Best results in major championships
- Masters Tournament: DNP
- PGA Championship: DNP
- U.S. Open: DNP
- The Open Championship: T25: 1914

David Paterson Watt (1885 – 25 April 1917) was a Scottish professional golfer. He won the Scottish Professional Championship in 1914. He was one of the few left-handed golfers of the period. Watt was in the Cameron Highlanders during World War I but died following a leg amputation.

== Early life ==
Watt was born in 1885 in Dunbar, East Lothian, Scotland. He had four golfing brothers: Jim, John, Robert and Willie.

== Golf career ==
While at Dirleton, Watt was runner-up to Willie Binnie in the 1909 Dunlop Cup, taking the second prize of £5.

In 1910 Watt became the professional at Mortonhall Golf Club, just south of Edinburgh.

Watt was runner-up in the 1912 Scottish Professional Championship. at Dunbar, 5 strokes behind his brother Willie. He took the second prize of £15. He went one better in the 1914 Championship at Glen Golf Club, beating Willie by 2 strokes and winning the first prize of £20. Willie led by 5 shots after the third round but took 78 in the final round to Davie's excellent 71. Willie came to the last hole needing 4 to tie but got into two bunkers and took 6. Watt played in the 1914 Open Championship at Prestwick Golf Club and finished tied for 25th place, again two shots better than Willie.

== Death ==
Watt died on 25 April 1917 in a Kent Hospital. He was in the Cameron Highlanders and died following a leg amputation. He was buried in Newington Cemetery in Edinburgh. His name is on the Dirleton War Memorial.

== Tournament wins ==
- 1914 Scottish Professional Championship

== Results in major championships ==
Tournament	1914
The Open Championship	T25

Note: Watt only played in The Open Championship.

"T" indicates a tie for a place
