= Dunlop Cup =

Dunlop Cup may refer a number of different golf tournaments sponsored by Dunlop

- The Dunlop Cup (Scotland), from 1909 to 1912.
- The Dunlop Cup (Australia), from 1930 to 1952.
