= 1905 Open Championship =

Coordinates: 56.043°N 2.823°W

Tournament information
- Dates: 7–9 June 1905
- Location: St Andrews, Scotland
- Course: Old Course at St Andrews

Statistics
- Field: 148 players, 45 after cut
- Cut: 172
- Prize fund: £115
- Winner's share: £50

Champion
- (Scotland) James Braid
- 318

Location in Scotland
Location in Fife, Scotland

The 1905 Open Championship was the 45th Open Championship, held 7–9 June at the Old Course at St Andrews, Fife, Scotland. James Braid won the Championship for the second time, five strokes ahead of runners-up Rowland Jones and John Henry Taylor.

All entries played 18 holes on the first two days; those within fourteen strokes of the lead made the cut for the final two rounds on Friday.

Strong winds and hard ground conditions made scoring difficult on all three days, with few rounds under 80. Sandy Herd, Taylor, Walter Toogood, and Harry Vardon co-led after the first round at 80. Scoring improved slightly on Thursday and Jones' 77 put him in the lead with 158; he was followed by Braid on 159 and James Kinnell and Arnaud Massy on 161. Just 45 players made the cut at 172 and better, including a sole amateur John Graham Jr.

In the third round on Friday morning, Braid's 78 extended his lead to six shots over Kinnell, Massy, and Taylor. Jones took 87 and dropped eight strokes behind Braid. Scoring 81 in the afternoon, Braid was never challenged; he reached the turn in 38 and despite taking six at the 15th and 16th holes, came back in 43. A 78 moved Jones up to a second place tie with Taylor, five strokes behind the champion.

== Round summaries ==
=== First round ===
Wednesday, 7 June 1905

Place	Player	Score
T1	(Scotland) Sandy Herd	80
T1	(England) J. H. Taylor	80
T1	(England) Walter Toogood	80
T1	(Jersey) Harry Vardon	80
T5	(Scotland) James Braid	81
T5	(England) Herbert Hunt	81
T5	(England) Rowland Jones	81
T5	(France) Arnaud Massy	81
T5	(England) Wilfrid Reid	81
T5	(Jersey) Thomas Renouf	81
T5	(England) James Sherlock	81
T5	(United States) Alex Smith	81
T5	(Scotland) Robert Thomson	81

=== Second round ===
Thursday, 8 June 1905

Place	Player	Score
1	(England) Rowland Jones	81-77=158
2	(Scotland) James Braid	81-78=159
T3	(Scotland) James Kinnell	82-79=161
T3	(France) Arnaud Massy	81-80=161
T5	(Scotland) Sandy Herd	80-82=162
T5	(Scotland) Robert Thomson	81-81=162
T5	(Jersey) Harry Vardon	80-82=162
T8	(England) Ernest Gray	82-81=163
T8	(England) Walter Toogood	80-83=163
T10	(Scotland) Willie Park Jr.	84-81=165
T10	(England) James Sherlock	81-84=165
T10	(England) J. H. Taylor	80-85=165
T10	(England) Tom Williamson	84-81=165

=== Third round ===
Friday, 9 June 1905 (morning)

Place	Player	Score
1	(Scotland) James Braid	81-78-78=237
T2	(Scotland) James Kinnell	82-79-82=243
T2	(France) Arnaud Massy	81-80-82=243
T2	(England) J. H. Taylor	80-85-78=243
T5	(Scotland) Robert Thomson	81-81-82=244
T5	(England) Tom Williamson	84-81-79=244
T7	(England) Rowland Jones	81-77-87=245
T7	(England) James Sherlock	81-84-80=245
T7	(Scotland) Sandy Herd	80-82-83=245
10	(Jersey) Harry Vardon	80-82-84=246

=== Final round ===
Friday, 9 June 1905 (afternoon)

Place	Player	Score	Money (£)
1	(Scotland) James Braid	81-78-78-81=318	50
T2	(England) Rowland Jones	81-77-87-78=323	20
T2	(England) J. H. Taylor	80-85-78-80=323	20
4	(Scotland) James Kinnell	82-79-82-81=324	10
T5	(England) Ernest Gray	82-81-84-78=325	7; 10s
T5	(France) Arnaud Massy	81-80-82-82=325	7; 10s
7	(Scotland) Robert Thomson	81-81-82-83=327	0
8	(England) James Sherlock	81-84-80-83=328	0
T9	(England) Tom Simpson	82-88-78-81=329	0
T9	(Jersey) Harry Vardon	80-82-84-83=329	0
