= European Open (golf) =

Coordinates: 53.3225°N 10.2265°E

Tournament information
- Location: Winsen, Germany
- Established: 1978
- Courses: Green Eagle Golf Courses (North Course)
- Par: 72
- Length: 7,603 yards (6,952 m)
- Tour: European Tour
- Format: Stroke play
- Prize fund: US$2,500,000
- Month played: June
- Final year: 2024

Tournament record score
- Aggregate: 260 Ian Woosnam (1988)
- To par: −21 Per-Ulrik Johansson (1997)

Current champion
- (England) Laurie Canter

Location map
- Location in Germany Location in Lower Saxony

The European Open was a European Tour golf tournament. Founded in 1978, up to 1994 it was played at various courses in England, including Sunningdale and Walton Heath, except for the 1979 event, which was held at Turnberry in Scotland. Between 1995 and 2007 the tournament was held at the K Club in Straffan, Ireland, before moving again in 2008, this time to the Jack Nicklaus-designed Heritage course at the London Golf Club near Sevenoaks, Kent, England. After a five-year hiatus, the event returned to the European Tour schedule in 2015, now played in Germany. The event was last played in 2024.

== Venues ==
Venue	Location	First	Last	Times
Walton Heath Golf Club	Surrey, England	1978	1991	5
Turnberry	South Ayrshire, Scotland	1979	1979	1
Royal Liverpool Golf Club	Wirral, England	1981	1981	1
Sunningdale Golf Club (Old Course)	Berkshire, England	1982	1992	8
East Sussex National Golf Club	Uckfield, England	1993	1994	2
The K Club	Straffan, Ireland	1995	2007	13
London Golf Club	Kent, England	2008	2009	2
Golf Resort Bad Griesbach	Bad Griesbach, Germany	2015	2016	2
Green Eagle Golf Courses (North Course)	Winsen, Germany	2017	2024	7

== Winners ==
Year	Winner	Score	To par	Margin of victory	Runner(s)-up	Venue
European Open
2024	(England) Laurie Canter	279	−13	2 strokes	(South Africa) Thriston Lawrence (Austria) Bernd Wiesberger	Green Eagle
Porsche European Open
2023	(Northern Ireland) Tom McKibbin	283	−9	2 strokes	(France) Julien Guerrier (Germany) Maximilian Kieffer (Germany) Marcel Siem	Green Eagle
2022	(Finland) Kalle Samooja	282	−6	2 strokes	(Netherlands) Wil Besseling	Green Eagle
2021	(England) Marcus Armitage	208 (Note: Shortened to 54 holes due to COVID-19 travel restrictions in Germany.)	−8	2 strokes	(Belgium) Thomas Detry (Italy) Edoardo Molinari (England) Matthew Southgate (Netherlands) Darius van Driel	Green Eagle
2020	Cancelled due to the COVID-19 pandemic					
2019	(England) Paul Casey	274	−14	1 stroke	(Scotland) Robert MacIntyre (Germany) Bernd Ritthammer (Austria) Matthias Schwab	Green Eagle
2018	(England) Richard McEvoy	277	−11	1 stroke	(Sweden) Christofer Blomstrand (Germany) Allen John (a) (Italy) Renato Paratore	Green Eagle
2017	(England) Jordan Smith	275	−13	Playoff	(France) Alexander Lévy	Green Eagle
2016	(France) Alexander Lévy	194 (Note: Shortened to 54 holes due to numerous fog delays.)	−19	Playoff	(England) Ross Fisher	Bad Griesbach
2015	(Thailand) Thongchai Jaidee	267	−17	1 stroke	(England) Graeme Storm	Bad Griesbach
European Open
2010–2014: No tournament
2009	(France) Christian Cévaër	281	−7	1 stroke	(Scotland) Gary Orr (Spain) Álvaro Quirós (England) Steve Webster	London
2008	(England) Ross Fisher	268	−20	7 strokes	(Spain) Sergio García	London
Smurfit Kappa European Open
2007	(Scotland) Colin Montgomerie	269	−11	1 stroke	(Sweden) Niclas Fasth	The K Club
2006	(Wales) Stephen Dodd	279	−9	2 strokes	(Spain) José Manuel Lara (England) Anthony Wall	The K Club
Smurfit European Open
2005	(England) Kenneth Ferrie	285	−3	2 strokes	(Scotland) Colin Montgomerie (England) Graeme Storm	The K Club
2004	(South Africa) Retief Goosen	275	−13	5 strokes	(Australia) Richard Green (Australia) Peter O'Malley (England) Lee Westwood	The K Club
2003	(Wales) Phillip Price	272	−16	1 stroke	(Scotland) Alastair Forsyth (Zimbabwe) Mark McNulty	The K Club
2002	(New Zealand) Michael Campbell	282	−6	1 stroke	(Wales) Bradley Dredge (South Africa) Retief Goosen (Republic of Ireland) Pádraig Harrington (Scotland) Paul Lawrie	The K Club
2001	(Northern Ireland) Darren Clarke	273	−15	3 strokes	(Denmark) Thomas Bjørn (Republic of Ireland) Pádraig Harrington (Wales) Ian Woosnam	The K Club
2000	(England) Lee Westwood (2)	276	−12	1 stroke	(Argentina) Ángel Cabrera	The K Club
1999	(England) Lee Westwood	271	−17	3 strokes	(Northern Ireland) Darren Clarke (Australia) Peter O'Malley	The K Club
1998	(Sweden) Mathias Grönberg	275	−13	10 strokes	(Spain) Miguel Ángel Jiménez (Wales) Phillip Price	The K Club
1997	(Sweden) Per-Ulrik Johansson (2)	267	−21	6 strokes	(England) Peter Baker	The K Club
1996	(Sweden) Per-Ulrik Johansson	277	−11	1 stroke	(Italy) Costantino Rocca	The K Club
1995	(Germany) Bernhard Langer (2)	280	−8	Playoff	(England) Barry Lane	The K Club
European Open
1994	(England) David Gilford	275	−13	5 strokes	(Spain) José María Olazábal (Italy) Costantino Rocca	East Sussex National
GA European Open
1993	(Scotland) Gordon Brand Jnr (2)	275	−13	7 strokes	(Wales) Phillip Price (Northern Ireland) Ronan Rafferty	East Sussex National
1992	(England) Nick Faldo	262	−18	3 strokes	(Sweden) Robert Karlsson	Sunningdale
1991	(Australia) Mike Harwood	277	−11	2 strokes	(Scotland) Sandy Lyle	Walton Heath
Panasonic European Open
1990	(Australia) Peter Senior	267	−13	1 stroke	(Wales) Ian Woosnam	Sunningdale
1989	(England) Andrew Murray	277	−11	1 stroke	(New Zealand) Frank Nobilo	Walton Heath
1988	(Wales) Ian Woosnam	260	−20	3 strokes	(England) Nick Faldo	Sunningdale
1987	(England) Paul Way	279	−9	2 strokes	(South Africa) John Bland (Scotland) Gordon Brand Jnr	Walton Heath
1986	(Australia) Greg Norman	269	−11	Playoff	(Scotland) Ken Brown	Sunningdale
1985	(West Germany) Bernhard Langer	269	−11	3 strokes	(Republic of Ireland) John O'Leary	Sunningdale
1984	(Scotland) Gordon Brand Jnr	270	−10	3 strokes	(Spain) Seve Ballesteros (Australia) Noel Ratcliffe	Sunningdale
1983	(Japan) Isao Aoki	274	−6	2 strokes	(Spain) Seve Ballesteros (England) Nick Faldo (England) Carl Mason	Sunningdale
European Open Championship
1982	(Spain) Manuel Piñero	266	−14	2 strokes	(Scotland) Sam Torrance	Sunningdale
Dixcel Tissues European Open
1981	(Australia) Graham Marsh	275	−13	2 strokes	(Spain) Seve Ballesteros	Royal Liverpool
European Open Championship
1980	(United States) Tom Kite	284	−8	1 stroke	(United States) Lon Hinkle (United States) Leonard Thompson	Walton Heath
1979	(Scotland) Sandy Lyle	275	−9	7 strokes	(South Africa) Dale Hayes (England) Peter Townsend	Turnberry
1978	(United States) Bobby Wadkins	283	−5	Playoff	(Scotland) Bernard Gallacher (United States) Gil Morgan	Walton Heath
