= Ridley, Kent =

Coordinates: 51.350250°N 0.315530°E

Ridley
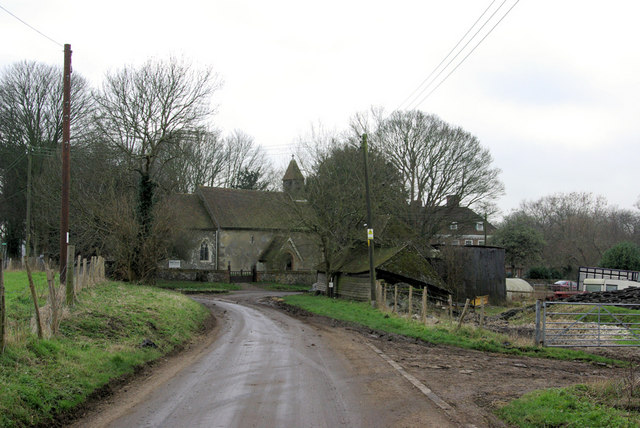
- Parish church of Ridley, a small church without tower or steeple, situated in agricultural land, there being no nucleated village

- Location within Kent
- Civil parish: Ash-cum-Ridley
- District: Sevenoaks
- Shire county: Kent
- Region: South East
- Country: England
- Sovereign state: United Kingdom
- Post town: Sevenoaks
- Postcode district: TN15
- Police: Kent
- Fire: Kent
- Ambulance: South East Coast
- UK Parliament: Tonbridge

Ridley is a place and former civil parish, now in the parish of Ash-cum-Ridley, in the Sevenoaks district, in the county of Kent, England. It lies between Sevenoaks and Chatham..

Ash and Ridley were formerly separate parishes. Both were part of Dartford Rural District (until 1974) and Axstane Hundred.

Ridley is situated upon chalk hills, much like that of neighbouring Hartley. The soil is chalky, light and much covered with flints. There is no village and the church stands in the southern part of Ridley, having the parsonage and a lodge nearby. Ridley is 3½ miles SSW of Meopham (railway station) and 7 miles SSW of Gravesend. It has an area of 814 acres, within the bounds of the formerly separate parish.

== History ==
Parish of Ridley, 1920 (parish boundaries shown as black dotted lines)

Ridley is mentioned in the Domesday Book as Redlege and is also recorded elsewhere as Redlegh. The parish consisted of a single manor and a court leet and court baron were held for this manor, the court lodge (Ridley Court) being near the church.

In the 19th century the population of Ridley rose from 47 in 1801 to maximum of 101 in 1861, but then declined to 73 by 1921. In 1951 it had a population of 70. Between 1849 and 1880 there was a Church School at Ridley.

Even after parish councils were established in 1894 under the Local Government Act 1894, Ridley continued to be governed by its Parish Meeting.

The parish was united with Ash on 1 April 1955, as part of a general revision of boundaries for parishes within Dartford Rural District.

== Local government ==
Hodsoll Street, New Ash Green, Ash and Ridley are the four wards of Ash-cum-Ridley parish council. Hodsoll Street was previously part of Ash parish

== Church ==
Ridley is within the ecclesiastical jurisdiction of the Anglican Diocese of Rochester. The church, which stands in the southern part of the parish, is dedicated to St. Peter. It is very small (seating appx 48 in pews additionally there are two choir pews in the chancel), having only one aisle and a chancel, but without either tower or steeple. As can be seen in the picture it has a Belfry which houses a single calling bell.

In the chancel before the altar, is a memorial for John Lambe, dec. 24 April 1740, above a chevron between three holy lambs, with stave and banners.

== Notable people ==
- Thomas Hennell, artist and writer, was born in Ridley.
