= James Souter =

Scottish cricketer

Personal information
- Full name: James Stewart Souter
- Born: 13 February 1923; Kanpur, United Provinces, British India
- Died: 21 October 1999 (aged 76); St Leonards-on-Sea, East Sussex, England
- Batting: Right-handed

Domestic team information
- Years: Team
- 1948: Oxford University

Career statistics
Competition	First-class
Matches	3
Runs scored	47
Batting average	23.50
100s/50s	–/–
Top score	30
Catches/stumpings	2/–
- Source: Cricinfo, 1 July 2020

James Stewart Souter (13 February 1923 – 21 October 1999) was an English first-class cricketer.

The son of the Scottish colonial administrator Sir Edward Souter, he was born at Kanpur in British India. He was educated in England at Haileybury, before going up to Brasenose College, Oxford in 1942. His studies at Oxford were interrupted by the ongoing Second World War, in which he served in the latter stages with the Royal Air Force Volunteer Reserve (RAFVR), enlisting as a pilot officer in April 1944. He served with the RAFVR until 1948, the year in which he was promoted to flying officer. He returned to Brasenose College in 1948, playing three first-class cricket matches for Oxford University against the Free Foresters, Lancashire and Middlesex in 1948. He scored 47 runs in his three matches, with a high score of 30. His brother, Ian, was killed in action during the war. He married Mary Atkinson at The Strand, London in 1948. Souter died in St Leonards-on-Sea, East Sussex on 21 October 1999, at the age of 76.
