= Robert Thomson (golfer) =

Scottish professional golfer (1875–1954)

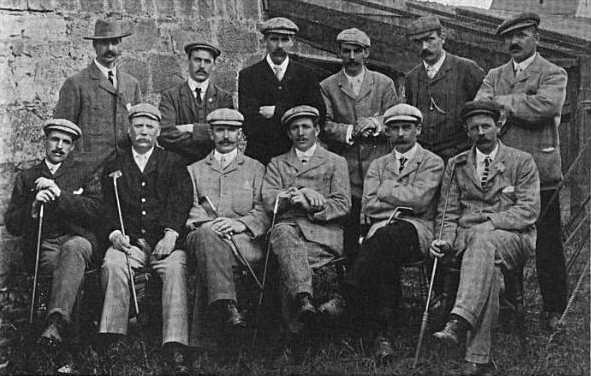
- Thomson (standing, 3rd from right) with the 1903 Scotland international team. James Braid stands to his right and Willie Park, Jr. stands to Thomson's left.

Personal information
- Nationality: Scotland
- Born: 16 December 1875 North Berwick, Scotland
- Died: 1954 (aged 78) North Berwick, Scotland

Career
- Sport: Golf
- Turned professional: c. 1892
- Professional wins: 3

Best results in major championships
- Masters Tournament: DNP
- PGA Championship: DNP
- U.S. Open: DNP
- The Open Championship: T6: 1903

Robert Thomson (16 December 1875 – 1954) was a Scottish professional golfer who played in the late 19th century into the early 20th century. Thomson had two career top-10 finishes in the Open Championship. In 1903 he finished tied for 6th place and in 1905 finished 7th.

== Early life ==
Thomson was born in North Berwick, Scotland, on 16 December 1875. He was the son of William Thomson, a fisherman, and his wife Margaret Lawrie. His father died at an early age and Thomson resided with his mother and elder brothers James and William in Russell Square. One of his first postings as a professional was at Grantham Golf Club where he stayed only a short time before returning to the West Links.

== Golf career ==
Thomson compiled an excellent playing career that included numerous caps for Scotland for the Home International Team from 1903–12, except the 1908 match which was cancelled due to inclement weather. He was frequently paired with Jack White for the international events. Thomson was Scottish Professional Champion in 1908, beating Willie Watt from Dirleton by 7 strokes in a 36-hole playoff. He was also runner-up in 1909 and 1911.

Thomson became the professional at Romford Golf Club in April 1904 where he replaced James Braid who was moving to Walton Heath Golf Club. Thomson was at Romford for about two years before moving back to North Berwick.

In a tournament at Walton Heath Golf Club in 1904 he qualified for the match play competition in which he dispatched Harry Vardon 1 up. In the semi-finals, however, he was defeated by J. H. Taylor who went on to lose the final to Rowland Jones. Thomson was a frequent competitor in the News of the World Tournament and in 1912 won a prize at Sunningdale.

The 1904 Open Championship was the first in which the competitors only played 18 holes on the first two days. The opening day was cold and windy which led to some high scoring. Thomson led with 75 after reaching the turn in 34, a shot ahead of amateur John Graham, Jr. and Harry Vardon. The second day was less windy. Thomson had a 76 and was in second place, two shots behind Vardon. Thomson had a poor final day, scoring 80 and 84 and finishing tied for 12th place.

The opening day of the 1910 Open Championship was abandoned because of rain but, when play resumed the following day, Thomson started with a 74 and was tied for second place at the end of the first round. He took 85 for his second round, including a 9 at the Road Hole, and made the cut by 2 shots. For some unknown reason he failed to appear when his name was called at the start of the third round and was disqualified.

== Death ==
A lifelong bachelor, Thomson died in 1954 aged 78 years.

== Tournament wins ==
- 1908 Scottish Professional Championship
- 1911 Dunlop Cup
- 1912 Dunlop Cup

== Results in The Open Championship ==
| Tournament | 1901 | 1902 | 1903 | 1904 | 1905 | 1906 | 1907 | 1908 | 1909 | 1910 | 1911 | 1912 |
|---|---|---|---|---|---|---|---|---|---|---|---|---|
| The Open Championship | CUT | DNP | T6 | T12 | 7 | T30 | T38 | 39 | T17 | DQ | T35 | T13 |

Note: Thomson played only in The Open Championship.

DNP = Did not play
CUT = Missed the cut
DQ = Disqualified
"T" indicates a tie for a place
Yellow background for top-10.

== Team appearances ==
- England–Scotland Professional Match (representing Scotland): 1903 (winners), 1904 (tie), 1905 (tie), 1906, 1907, 1909, 1910, 1912 (tie)
- Coronation Match (representing the Professionals): 1911 (winners)
