= East Sussex National Golf Club =

Golf club in East Sussex, England

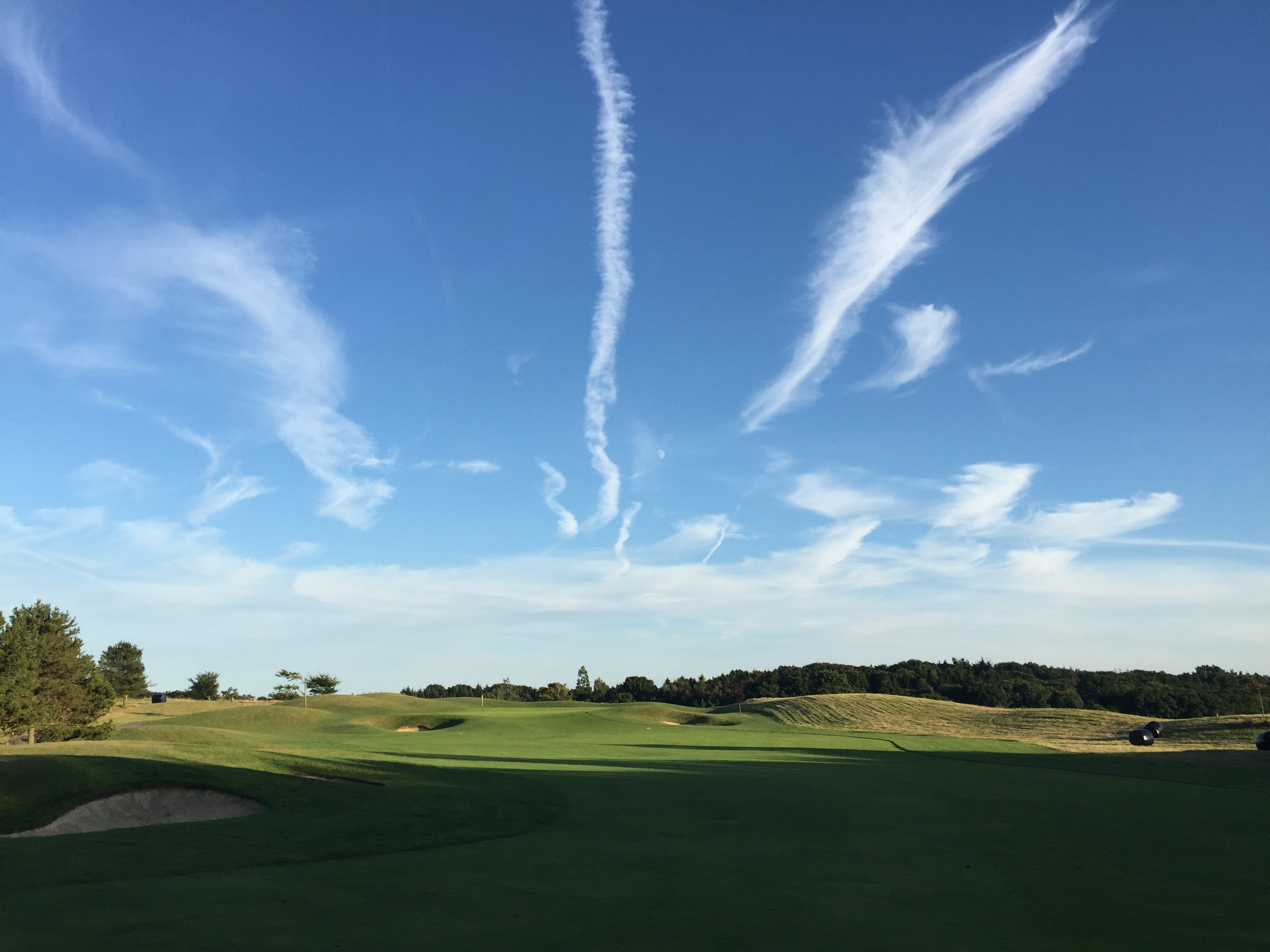
- Interactive map of East Sussex National Golf Club
- 50.9415°N 0.1008°E

Club information
- Location: Uckfield, East Sussex, England
- Tota holes: 18

East Course
- Designed by: Bob Cupp
- Par: 72
- Length: 7,081 yards (6,475 m)

West Course
- Designed by: Bob Cupp
- Par: 72
- Length: 7,154 yards (6,542 m)

East Sussex National Golf Club is a golf course located near to Uckfield in East Sussex, England. There are two 18 hole courses designed by Bob Cupp.

The East Course measures 7,081 yards and is designed for tournament play. It has been the setting for the European Open on two occasions. The West Course is a par 72 and is 7,154 yards and hosted the Challenge Tour Championship between 1995 and 1998 and the European Tour Qualifying School between 1994 and 1997.
