= James Kinnell =

Scottish golfer

Personal information
- Nationality: Scotland
- Born: 1876 Leven, Fife, Scotland
- Died: 22 April 1918 (aged 42) France
- Spouse: Ellen Edith Kinnell

Career
- Sport: Golf
- Turned professional: 1894

Best results in major championships
- Masters Tournament: DNP
- PGA Championship: DNP
- U.S. Open: DNP
- The Open Championship: 4th: 1905

James Kinnell (1876 – 22 April 1918) was a Scottish professional golfer who played in the late 19th and early 20th century. Kinnell had five top-10 finishes in the Open Championship. His best performance came in the 1905 Open Championship when he finished in fourth place. He served as the head professional at the Prestwick St Nicholas Golf Club in Prestwick, Scotland. His brother David, also a professional golfer, worked at the club as well.

Kinnell was killed in action in France on 22 April 1918 during World War I.

== Early life ==
Kinnell was born in 1876 in Leven, Fife, Scotland, to James Kinnell and his wife Janet. He became a licensed golf professional at North Berwick in 1894.

== Golf career ==
=== 1905 Open Championship ===
The 1905 Open Championship was held 7–9 June at the Old Course at St Andrews, Fife, Scotland. Scottish linksman James Braid won the Championship for the second time, by five strokes from runners-up Rowland Jones and J.H. Taylor.

==== Details of play ====
All entries played 18 holes on the first two days with all those within 14 strokes of the leader making the cut and playing 36 holes on the final day. Strong winds and hard ground conditions made scoring difficult on all three days and there were but just a scant few rounds under 80. Sandy Herd, Taylor and Harry Vardon led after the first round with scores of 80. Scoring was slightly better on the second day with Jones's 77 giving him the lead on 158. He was followed by Braid on 159 and Kinnell and Arnaud Massy on 161. Just 45 players made the cut of 172. Only one amateur, John Graham Jr., was able to survive the cut.

Kinnell played steady golf despite having to deal with adverse playing conditions, particularly the blustery winds. On the final leaderboard he was in the fourth position and took home £10 as his share of the purse.

== Death and legacy ==
Kinnell was killed in action in France on 22 April 1918 during World War I. He was a private in the Queen's Own (Royal West Kent Regiment) 1st Battalion. He was buried in the Morbecque British Cemetery. He is best remembered as a consistent and steady performer in the Open Championship with five top-10 finishes and for military service to his country.

== Results in major championships ==
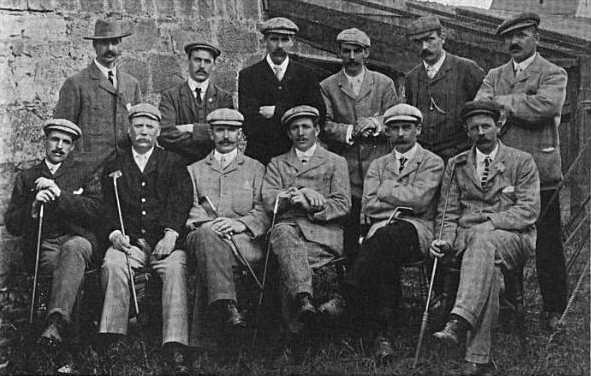
A group photo of the 1903 Scotland team. Kinnell is seated far left.

Tournament	1895	1896	1897	1898	1899	1900	1901	1902	1903	1904	1905	1906	1907	1908	1909	1910	1911
The Open Championship	23	WD	T20	T15	T7	CUT	T7	T6	T15	CUT	4	T28	T29			T8	CUT

Note: Kinnell played only in The Open Championship.

Top 10
Did not play

WD = withdrew
CUT = missed the half-way cut
"T" indicates a tie for a place

== Team appearances ==
- England–Scotland Professional Match (representing Scotland): 1903 (winners), 1904 (tie), 1905 (tie), 1906, 1907, 1910, 1912 (tie)
