= Dunlop Cup (Scotland) =

Tournament information
- Established: 1909
- Final year: 1912

Final champion
- Robert Thomson

The Dunlop Cup was a professional golf tournament played annually in Scotland from 1909 to 1912.

== History ==
Entry was restricted to PGA members of the Scottish section and other professionals attached to a Scottish club. Prize money was £25, with £20 for the winner and £5 for the runner-up. The cup became the permanent property of any player who won it three times or two years in succession. Robert Thomson won in 1911 and 1912, so he won the cup outright. The event was played either the day after or the day before the Scottish qualifying for the News of the World Match Play.

== Winners ==
Year	Winner	Country	Venue	Score	Margin of victory	Runner(s)-up	Winner's share (£)	Ref
1909	Willie Binnie	Scotland	Burntisland	144	7 strokes	(Scotland) Davie Watt	20	
1910	David Kinnell	Scotland	Troon Municipal	147	Playoff	(Scotland) Tom Fernie (Scotland) Robert Thomson	20	
1911	Robert Thomson	Scotland	Elie	148	5 strokes	(Scotland) George Smith	20	
1912	Robert Thomson	Scotland	North Berwick	143	5 strokes	(Scotland) Willie Watt	20	

In 1910, there was an 18-hole playoff on the following day. Kinnell scored 75, Fernie 76, and Thomson 79. Fernie took the second prize of £5.
