= London Golf Club =

Coordinates: 51°20′46″N 0°17′19″E

The London Golf Club
- Interactive map of The London Golf Club

Club information
- Location: Ash, Kent, England
- Established: 1993
- Type: Semi-Private Members Club
- Owner: Bendinat Group
- Tota holes: 36
- Tournaments: European Open; Volvo World Match Play Championship; PGA Seniors Championship; Cazoo Classic
- Website: www.londongolf.co.uk

The Heritage Course
- Designed by: Jack Nicklaus
- Par: 72
- Length: 7,208
- Course record: 63 Ross Fisher (2008)

The International Course
- Designed by: Ron Kirby
- Par: 72
- Length: 7,005
- Course record: 63 Colin Montgomerie (2018); 63 Philip Golding (2018); 63 Peter Scott (2018)

The London Golf Club is a privately owned golf course located in the village of Ash, Kent, approximately 20 miles southeast of London.

== History ==
The golf club was originally developed by the Japanese businessman Masao Nagahara, in response to a perceived need for a world class golf course in the vicinity of London and purportedly at the behest of Margaret Thatcher. Although the club was originally opened in September 1993 by Sir Denis Thatcher, the official course opening was in July 1994 and was accompanied by a charity skins match between Jack Nicklaus, Seve Ballesteros and Tony Jacklin. After the original owners experienced financial difficulties, the course was purchased in 2003 by the Bendinat group (who also own the Royal Bendinat Golf Club in Mallorca) for an undisclosed sum. Since the purchase, the club has hosted numerous tournaments on both the European Senior Tour and the European Tour, including the 2014 Volvo World Match Play Championship and the 2018 and 2019 PGA Seniors Championship.

== Courses ==
=== The Heritage Course ===
The Heritage Course was designed by Jack Nicklaus one of only three courses in England under his name.

The Heritage Course
Tee	Rating/Slope	1	2	3	4	5	6	7	8	9	Out	10	11	12	13	14	15	16	17	18	In	Total
Blue	74 / 113	398	412	194	384	541	454	187	563	448	3581	426	208	531	338	443	548	465	225	443	3627	7208
White	72 / 113	382	387	170	361	516	422	159	536	421	3354	408	175	502	311	424	523	440	210	424	3417	6771
Yellow	70 / 113	360	364	149	338	491	402	141	503	401	3149	380	157	468	280	408	496	406	191	398	3184	6333
Par		4	4	3	4	5	4	3	5	4	36	4	3	5	4	4	5	4	3	4	36	72
Ladies'	74 / 113	328	323	127	299	477	357	132	470	359	2872	332	138	454	249	358	472	377	152	355	2887	5759
Par	Ladies'	4	4	3	4	5	4	3	5	4	36	4	3	5	4	4	5	4	3	4	36	72

=== The International Course ===
The International Course was designed by Ron Kirby under the banner of Nicklaus Design. He has been quoted as describing the 13th hole as "the best par 5 hole I have ever created".

The International Course
Tee	Rating/Slope	1	2	3	4	5	6	7	8	9	Out	10	11	12	13	14	15	16	17	18	In	Total
Blue	74 / 113	568	373	449	197	406	592	367	201	463	3616	373	552	190	532	198	368	405	229	542	3389	7005
White	71 / 113	547	349	430	197	378	555	345	186	440	3427	357	527	177	501	173	340	376	207	509	3167	6594
Yellow	69 / 113	524	326	399	177	346	518	325	173	409	3197	333	495	161	475	155	309	350	184	482	2944	6141
Par		5	4	4	3	4	5	4	3	4	36	4	5	3	5	3	4	4	3	5	36	72
Ladies'	73 / 113	453	283	359	148	320	492	292	159	367	2873	297	446	136	423	132	273	327	159	428	2621	5494
Par	Ladies'	5	4	4	3	4	5	4	3	4	36	4	5	3	5	3	4	4	3	5	36	72

== Tournaments ==
=== European Open ===
The European Open was held over the Heritage course in 2008 and 2009.

Year	Winner	Country	Score	To par	Margin of victory	Runner(s)-up
2009	Christian Cévaër	France	281	−7	1 stroke	(Scotland) Gary Orr (Spain) Álvaro Quirós (England) Steve Webster
2008	Ross Fisher	England	268	−20	7 strokes	(Spain) Sergio García

=== Volvo World Matchplay Championship ===
The Volvo World Match Play Championship was held on the International course in 2014.

Year	Winner	Country	Score	Runner-up
2014	Mikko Ilonen	Finland	3 & 1	(Sweden) Henrik Stenson

=== PGA Seniors Championship ===
The PGA Seniors Championship, now under the name of the Staysure PGA Seniors Championship was held over the International Course in both 2018 and 2019.

Year	Winner	Country	Score	Margin of victory	Runner(s)-up
2019	Phillip Price	Wales	271 (−17)	2 strokes	(New Zealand) Michael Campbell (South Africa) James Kingston (Australia) Peter Lonard
2018	Philip Golding	England	270 (−18)	2 strokes	(Sweden) Magnus Persson Atlevi

=== London Seniors Masters ===
The London Seniors Masters was held over the Heritage Course in 1995 and 2005–2007

Year	Winner	Country	Score	Margin of victory	Runner(s)-up
2007	Sam Torrance (2)	Scotland	206(-10)	1 stroke	(Spain) José Rivero
2006	Giuseppe Calì	Italy	210(−6)	Playoff	(Jamaica) Delroy Cambridge
2005	Sam Torrance	Scotland	201(-15)	3 strokes	(England) David J. Russell
1995	John Bland	England	210(-6)	4 strokes	(England) Tony Grubb (South Africa) Hugh Inggs (England) John Morgan (South Africa) Bobby Verwey
