= Bushey Hall Golf Club =

Golf course in Hertfordshire, England

- Location within Hertfordshire

General information
- Location: Bushey, Watford, Hertfordshire, United Kingdom
- Coordinates: 51.6452°N 0.3604°W
- Completed: 1889
- Client: Robert Stewart Clouston

Bushey Hall Golf Club, founded by Robert Stewart Clouston in 1889, was one of the oldest parkland golf courses in Hertfordshire. Originally opened as a nine-hole course, it was extended to the full 18 holes by 1893 and was now a 6,005-yard course. It is now closed and plans for a 350 house development have been approved.

== Bushey Hall history ==
The first captain of Bushey Hall Golf Club was A. J. Balfour who accepted presidency at the first official meeting on 24 March 1890.

Throughout Bushey's history the club was run by a series of different proprietors, who through various measures ensured the club thrived. The fairways received an enviable reputation and the clubhouse was extended to cover two storeys with an open veranda overlooking the 18th hole for £1,100.

=== First and Second World Wars ===
During both the world wars the club was requisitioned by the government, during the first used as a training depot for the Brigade of Guards and during the second as a base for American forces. Unlike the First World War, during the Second World War play was allowed at the course, although access to the clubhouse was restricted. The club was a part of the Coats Mission, a plan to evacuate the Royal Family in the case of a German invasion.

=== Recent history ===
In 1986, the freehold of the course and club was sold to London-based hotel group Veladail Leisure, who now own and operate the club. Over half a million pounds has recently been spent on new tees, irrigation systems, golf buggies, equipment for maintaining the course and refurbishing the club house.

In October 2019 the course closed. The reason for this was due to the clubhouse being demolished, to be replaced with 32 new flats. A new clubhouse is due to be built on the site and the clube re-opened in 2021.

== Rumours linking course to Watford F.C. ==
Early 2020 rumours of Watford F.C. purchasing the site and building a new stadium have started to circulate around social media platforms, with plans and artistic impressions being shared.
