= Clan Watson =

Scottish clan

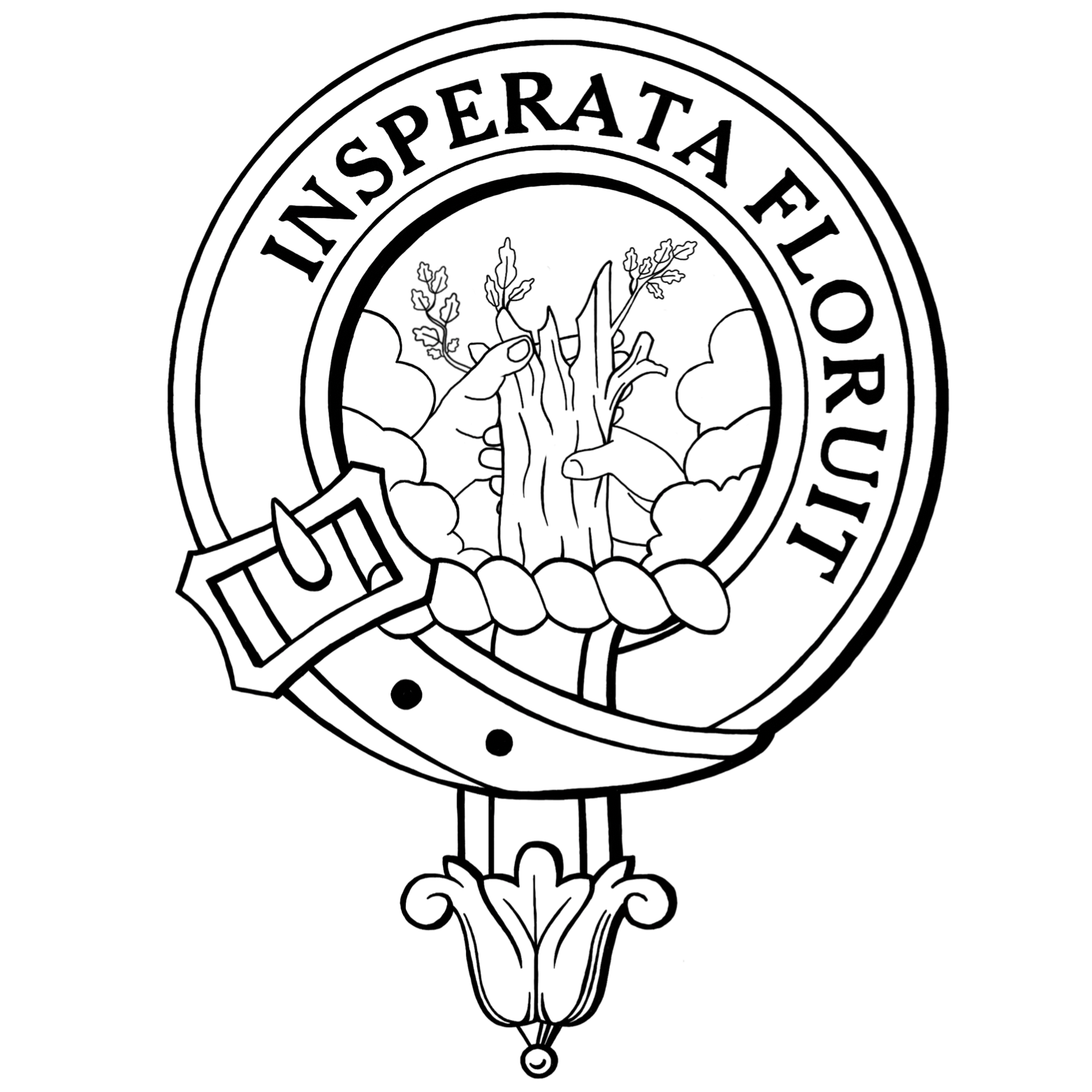
- Crest: Two hands holding the trunk of an oak tree sprouting the hands issuing out of clouds.
- Motto: Insperata Floruit (It has flourished unexpectedly)

Profile
- Region: Lowlands
- District: Lothian
- Clan Watson no longer has a chief, and is an armigerous clan
- Historic seat: Saughton House
- Last Chief: James Watson of Saughton
- Died: 1823
Septs of Clan Watson
MacQuat, MacQuattie, MacQuhat, MacQwat, MacQwattie, MacRowatt, MacWalter, MacWater, MacWatson, MacWatt, MacWatters, MacWattie, Vatsoun, Walter, Walterson, Wasson, Waters, Waterson, Watson, Watsone, Watsoun, Watt, Wattie, Wattson.

Clan Watson is a Scottish clan that is recognised as such by the Lord Lyon King of Arms. The clan does not currently have a chief recognised by the Court of the Lord Lyon.

The name Watson is derived from Watt, a diminutive form of the personal name Walter, with the addition of the patronymic suffix " -son". The name Watson is believed to have been introduced to Scotland in the early 11th century, during the reign of Edward the Confessor. However, being wide spread and patronymic, has no single origin.

According to the National Records of Scotland in 2021, Watson is the 19th most common surname in Scotland.

== Origins and history ==
=== Watson of Cranston ===
In 1384 Robert II re-granted the lands of Cranstonriddel to William Watson with an entail to his heirs male, failing which to the heirs of Alexander de Moravia. In 1407, William Watson of Cranston obtained a Crown charter of the estates of Traquair and Shillinglaw having purchased them from the Maitlands. in 1409 the Maitlands granted annual-rents of Griestoun in Peeblesshire, to Marion de Craigie and her son William Watson.

A John Watson is recorded owning lands in Edinburgh in 1392. Early Scottish records note that Thomas Watson of Stenhous was party to an inquest near Falkirk in 1426. Moray records refer to "Sir Donald Watsone" in 1493.

=== The Watson of Saughton ===
The chiefly line of Watson in Scotland were the Watsons of Saughton. Richard Watson is recorded owning the property of Saughton House in 1537.

David Watson of Saughton (1637-1685) was admitted to The Society of Writers to Her Majesty's Signet on 1 June 1655, having been apprenticed to Harry Osburn, and served as Treasurer of the society between 1662-1682.

The last known Clan Chief recognised by Lord Lyon King of Arms was James Watson Esq. of Saughton (1781-1823) who matriculated arms in 1818, within which was stated as being "Chief of the name in Scotland" and "descended in the direct male line from Richard Watson of Saughton, proprietor of those lands in A.D. 1537".

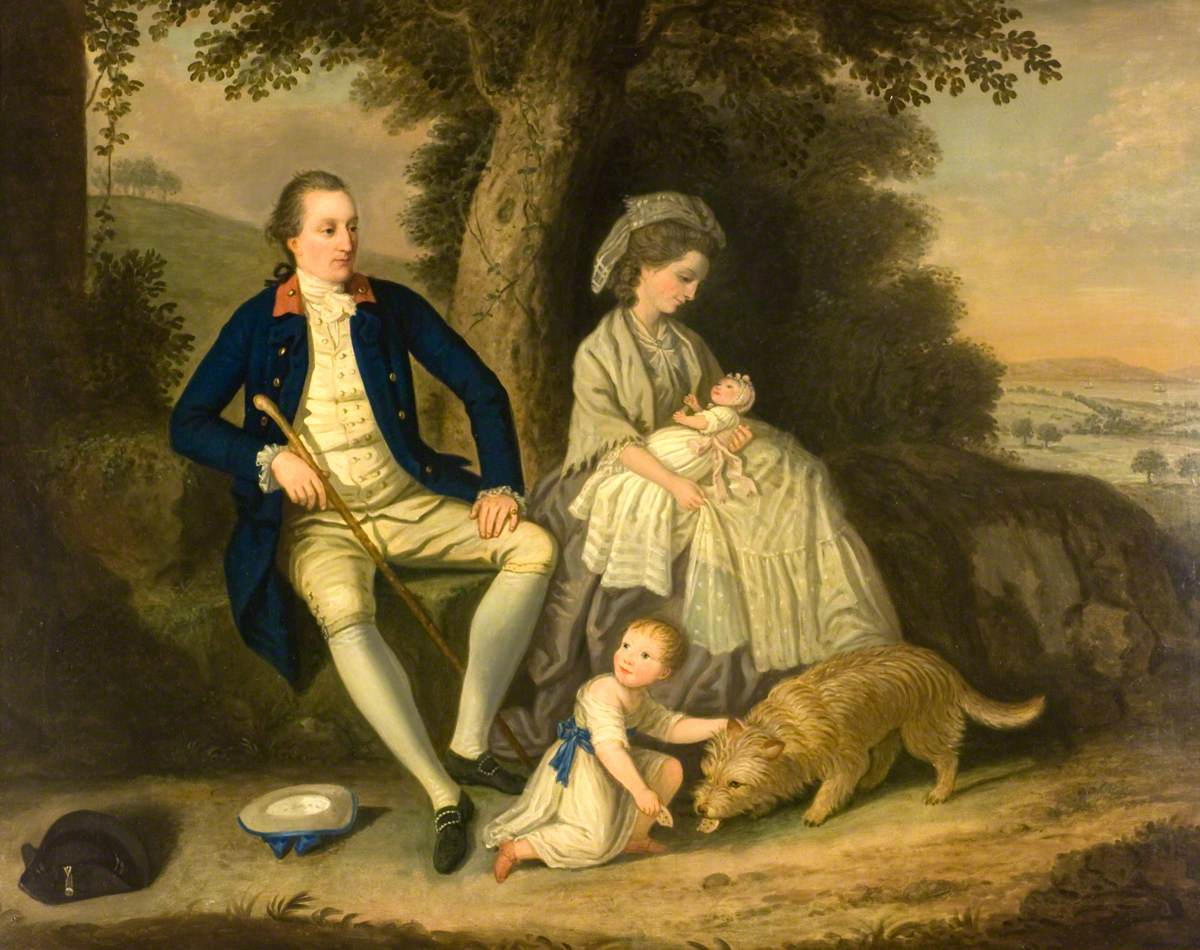
Charles Watson, Esq. of Saughton and his wife, Margaret Carnegie, with two of their children, James and Anne, in a landscape.

The father of James Watson Esq. of Saughton, Charles Watson of Saughton was stated as being "Chief of the name in Scotland" within the contemporary publication "Antient and Modern State of the Parish of Cramond" written by John Philip Wood and published 10 years before the death of Charles Watson in 1794.

The direct line of James Watson Esq. of Saughton ended when his daughter Helen Watson married Sholto John Douglas, 18th Earl of Morton.

By the 19th Century Watsons were considerable landowners around the Edinburgh and Midlothian area.

=== The Watsons as a Sept ===
The name Watson is recognised as a sept of both Clan Buchanan and Clan Forbes. The association to Clan Buchanan is through the MacWatties of Luss, who were a cadet branch of the Buchanans of Leny, and the association with the Forbeses is due to the historical presence of a large Watt kin group in Forbes lands in Aberdeenshire.

== Historic seat ==
The historic seat of Clan Watson is Saughton, Midlothian.

The name 'Saughton' (referred to anciently as 'Salectuna') most likely comes from the Scots word 'Sauch' which in turn may derive from the Gaelic word 'Saileach' which means willow.

Sauchton first appears in the records with the formation of Holyrood Abbey in 1128, being amongst the lands given by King David I of Scotland to the Abbey as "the town of Sauchton and its several divisions".

Robert, Commendator of Holyrood Abbey, granted a charter of feu farm of six oxengates of the town and lands of Saughton, in the Regality of Broughton, in favour of Janet Stenhope relict (widow) of Richard Watson of Saughton, in liferent, and his son James Watson in fee, in the year 1537, having resumed ownership of the lands after the family had been dispossessed of them for a hundred years.

Saughton House (Old Saughton House) was located 1 mile South of Corstorphine and was passed down through the descendants of Richard Watson until James Watson (Grandfather of the last known Chief of the Watson Clan) who purchased Cammo House in 1741 for £4252, 10s and changed the name to "New Saughton".

Mr. W. Traquair Dickson, a solicitor, who later owned Old Saughton House stated, "A good many alterations on the house were made, evidently about the end of the seventeenth or early in the eighteenth century. The Watsons of Saughton were then wealthy and prominent people."

In 1918 the house was destroyed by fire and was later demolished to be replaced with a school and today is now a housing estate.

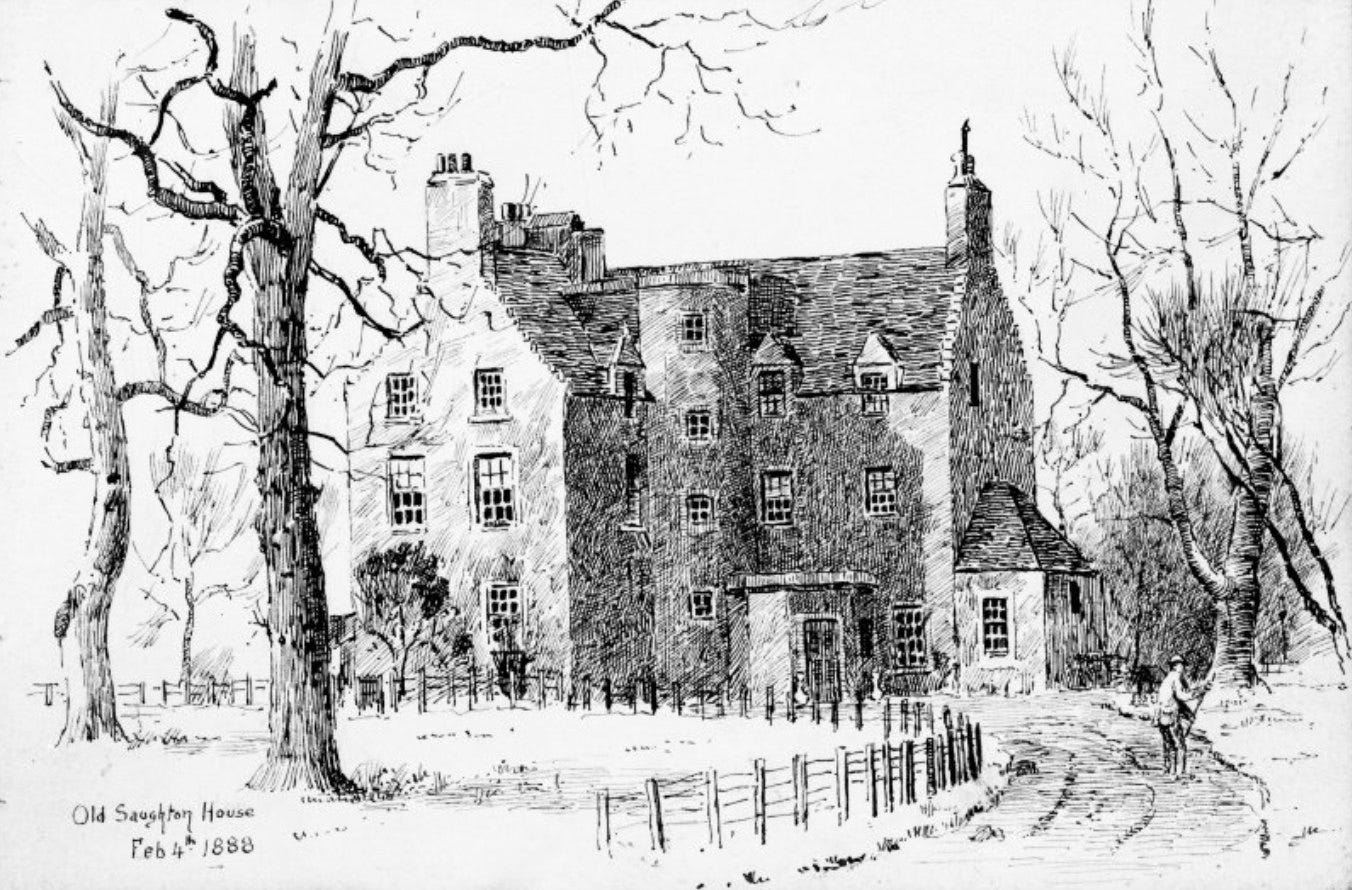
Old Saughton House 1888

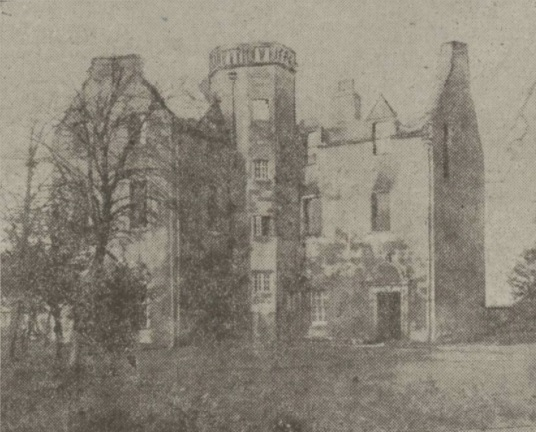
Old Saughton House following fire in 1918

== Notable individuals associated with Clan Watson ==
=== Major-General David Watson ===
Major-general David Watson (1704–1761) was a Scottish Officer of the British Army, serving in the Royal Engineers. He was the son of Robert Watson of Muirhouse, descendants of the ancient family of Saughton. David fought in multiple battles during the War of the Austrian Succession and the Jacobite Rising, including the Battle of Culloden. However is most noted for his contributions to the first Ordinance Surveys of Great Britain

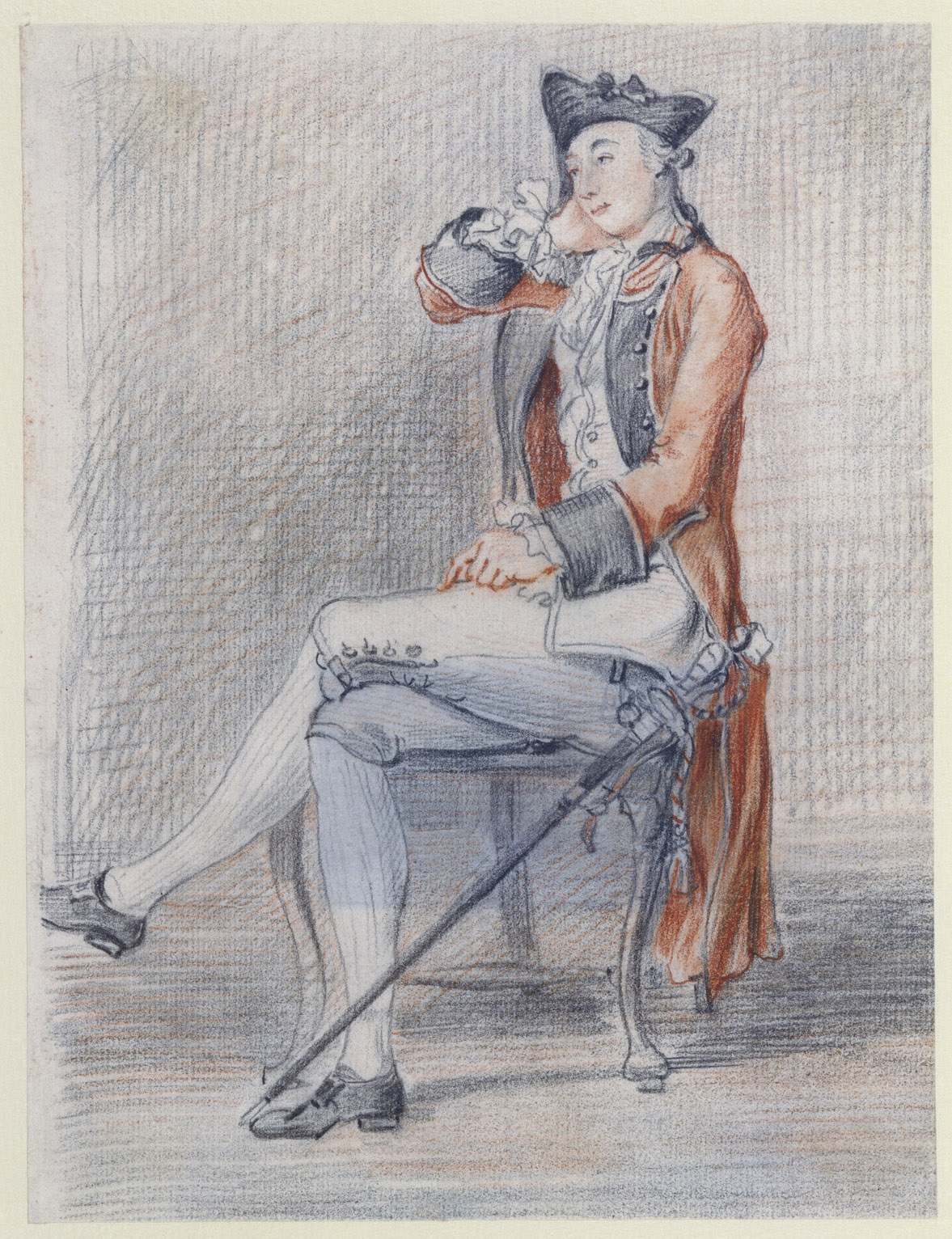
Col. David Watson by Paul Sandby (c. 1750)

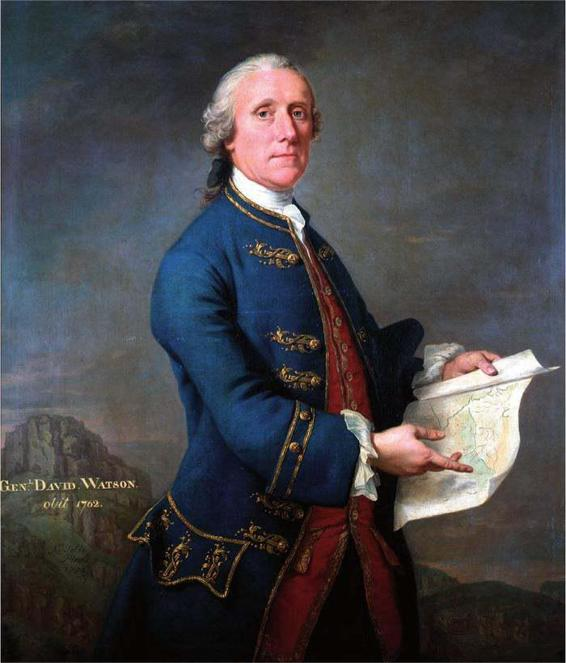
General David Watson by Andrea Soldi

=== Captain (Royal Navy) Charles Hope Watson ===
Charles Hope Watson (1786-1836) was the son of Charles Watson Esq. of Saughton, and younger brother of the last known Chief of Clan Watson, James Watson Esq. of Saughton. He is listed within The Trafalgar Roll, having served as an 18 year old Midshipman aboard HMS Defence during the Battle of Trafalgar under the command of Capt. George Johnstone Hope. Charles also served upon frigate HMS Unité as a Lieutenant, under the command of Captain Patrick Campbell during the capture of three Italian brigs in the Adriatic in 1808, and upon promotion to the rank of Captain in the Royal Navy captained both HMS Arachne, an 18 gun Cruiser, and HMS_Talbot_(1824) a 28-gun, Atholl-class frigate.

== Clan Watson Tartan ==
The Watson tartan was designed in 1932 by Rev. Mhuir Watson, and is registered with the Scottish Register of Tartans.

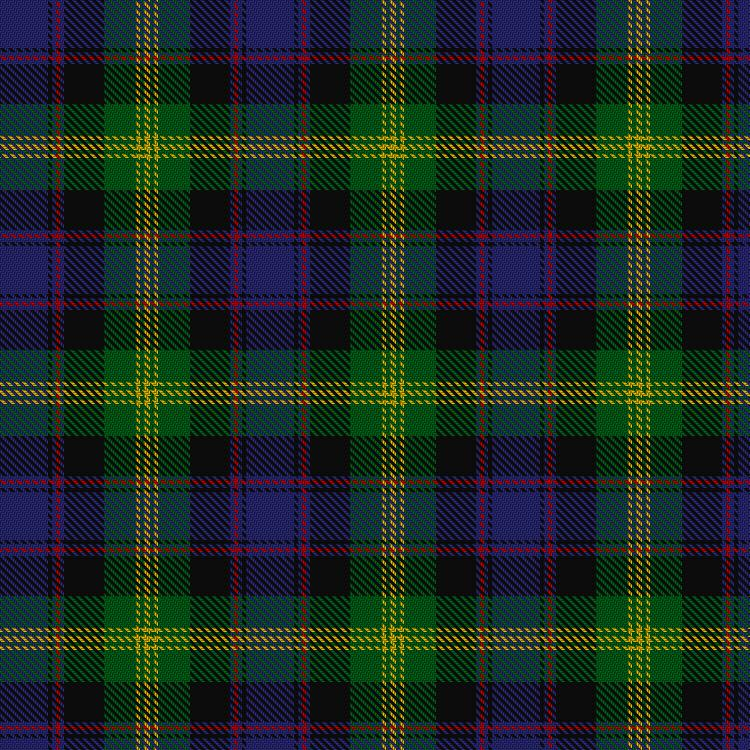
Watson tartan, 1932

Watson of Saughton coat of arms. ARMS Argent, an oak tree growing out of a mount in base Proper, surmounted of a fess Azure CREST Two hands holding the trunk of an oak tree sprouting the hands issuing out of clouds MOTTO Insperata floruit SUPPORTERS Two gryphons Proper gorged of a ducal coronet Or.

== Watson Heraldry and Clan Branches ==
David Watson of Saughton first recorded the chiefly arms in 1672, being "argent, an oak-tree growing out of a mount in base proper, surmounted of a fess azure." Later, in 1818, his descendent, James Watson of Saughton recorded the arms with Supporters. The Arms of John Watson are those of David's second brother.

Watson of Saughton

Arms of John Watson

Five other early arms were recorded between 1672–75, those of the Watsons of Croslatt, the Watsons of Glentarkie (near Strathmiglo), Alexander Watson Bailie of Dundee; Andrew Watson, a merchant in Aberdeen; and Andrew Watson, merchant in Peterhead.

Watson of Croslatt

Watson of Glentarkie

Alexander Watson, Bailie of Dundee

Andrew Watson, Aberdeen

Andrew Watson, Peterhead

The Arms of the Watsons of Muirehouse were registered in 1722. They were the Watsons of Damhead before they purchased the barony of Muirhouse from the Hunters some time after 1697. Muirhouse was later sold by Lieutenant-Colonel Robert Watson to William Davidson in 1776. Major-General David Watson was Robert Watson of Muirhouse's son.

The arms of George Watson, a merchant in Edinburgh, were registered in 1739. George Watson was a philanthropist and the founder of George Watson's College, Edinburgh. Recent research has revealed that part of his fortune was acquired in the transatlantic slave trade.

Watson of Muirhouse, 1722

George Watson, Edinburgh, 1739

The Watsons of Neilsland registered their arms in 1871 and in 1895 John Watson of Neilsland became the first baronet of Earnock. Sir John was a coal tycoon and amassed considerable wealth, purchasing and combining the estates of Neilsland and Earnock in 1871 and 1873 respectively into an estate of about 2000 acres.

The arms of Sir James Watson of Broomknowe were registered in 1872. Sir James was Glasgow's first stock broker, the Lord Provost of Glasgow from 1871 to 1874 and was knighted in 1874.

The arms of William Watson, Lord Watson, were registered in 1880, at the same time he has ennobled as Baron Watson of Thankerton. Lord Watson was a conservative member of parliament for Glasgow and Aberdeen Universities 1876–1880, Solicitor General for Scotland 1874–1876, Lord Advocate 1876–1880, appointed to the Privy Council in 1878 sat on the Judicial Committee of the Privy Council.

The arms of the Watsons of Langley House were registered in Scotland in 1881. In 1881 James Watson, of Langley House became High Sheriff of Buckinghamshire.

The arms of the Watsons of Shielhill and Terpersy were possibly registered some time before 1855. The seat of this branch was Shielhill House near Kirriemui, Angus. This branch are also of the Watsons of Tipperty (near Aberdeen) and was notably represented by Lieutenant-General Archibald Watson, Colonel of the 1st Bengal Cavalry, H.E.I.C.S.

Watson Baronets of Earnock, also known as Watson of Neilsland

James Watson of Broomknowe, Lord Provost of Glasgow

Lord William Watson, Baron Watson, Lord Advocate

Watson of Langley House, near Slough, 1881

Watson of Shielhill and Terpersy

The arms of William Livingstone Watson were registered in 1887. William joined the East India merchants and was an astronomer. He purchased the estate of Ayton House in Perthshire.

The arms of the Watson of Braco Castle, Perthshire were registered in 1903. Sir Remy Watson of Braco Castle acquired the Rembrandt painting Anna and the Blind Tobit which his son, Denis Watson, sold to the National Gallery in 1926.

The arms of Alan Watson, Falkirk were registered in the early 2000s. Alan Watson was regius professor of forensic medicine at Glasgow University. His arms offer an insight into how modern heraldry incorporates the identity of a person: the hourglass refers to his professional body, the Faculty of Actuaries, and the "fess brettessed the crenelles semicircular" (the purple buttressed line crossing the oak) represents the binding between stamps and his philatelic interests.

Arms of William Livingstone Watson, London 1887

Watson of Braco Castle

Arms of Professor Alan Watson, Falkirk; Reg. early 2000s

== The Watson Mazer ==
The Watson Mazer is the earliest in the sequence of Scottish standing mazers, featuring the coat of arms of David Watson of Saughton. A hallmark may relate to the goldsmith Adam Leys. Chemical analysis places it in the early 16th century. It is constructed of a maple wood bowl with a silver-gilt band, resting on a silver stem and an inscribed trumpet-shaped foot.

On the foot of mazer is the inscription "TYNE GEIR TYNE LITIL TYNE HONOVR TYNE MUCKIL TYNE HART TYNE AL" which translates to "Lost wealth lost little, lost honour lost much, lost heart lost all".

The Watson Mazer is on display as part of the Silver Treasury, level 5 of the Scotland Galleries in Edinburgh.

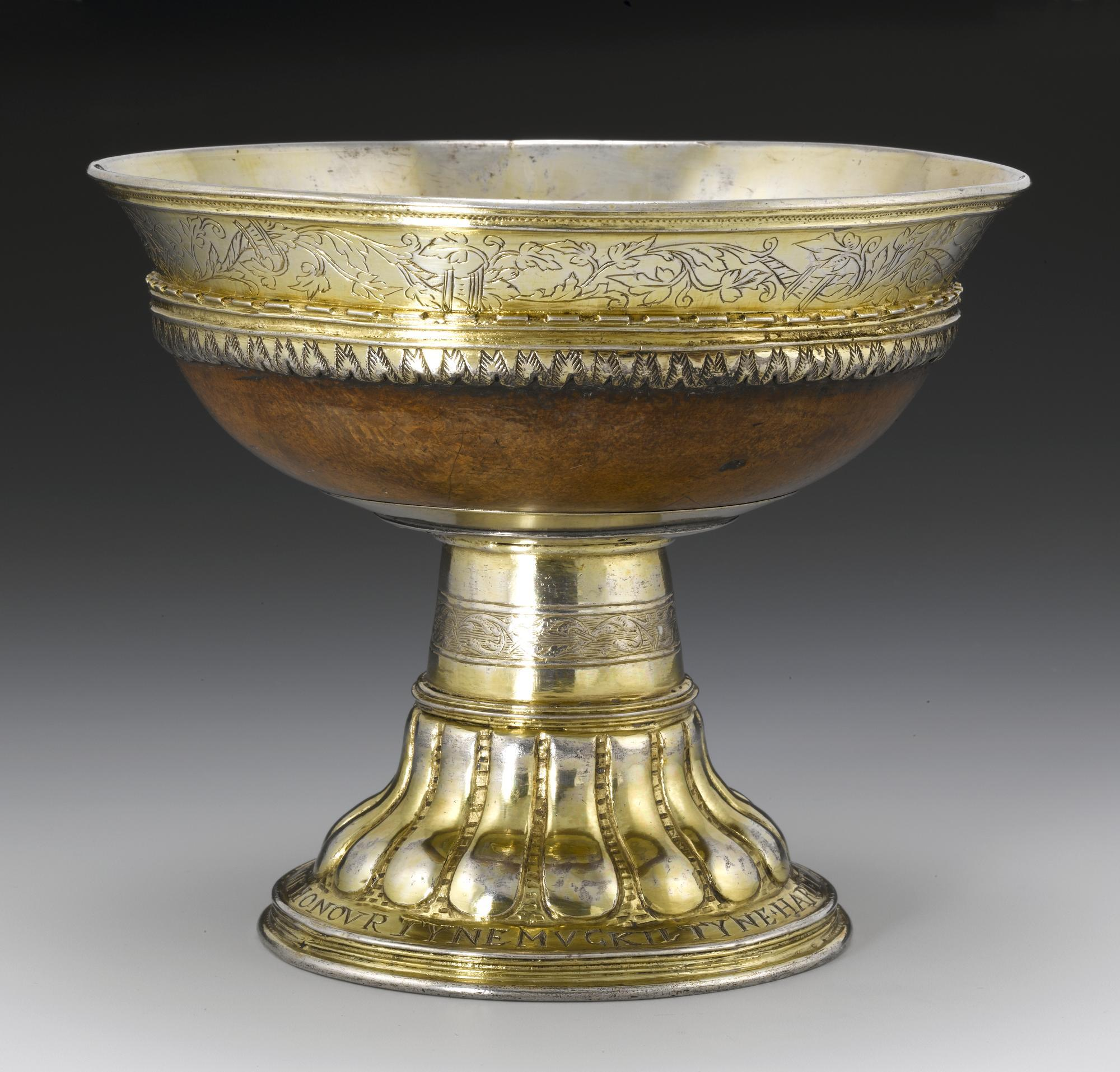
The earliest in a series of Scottish Standing Mazers from the early 16th Century.

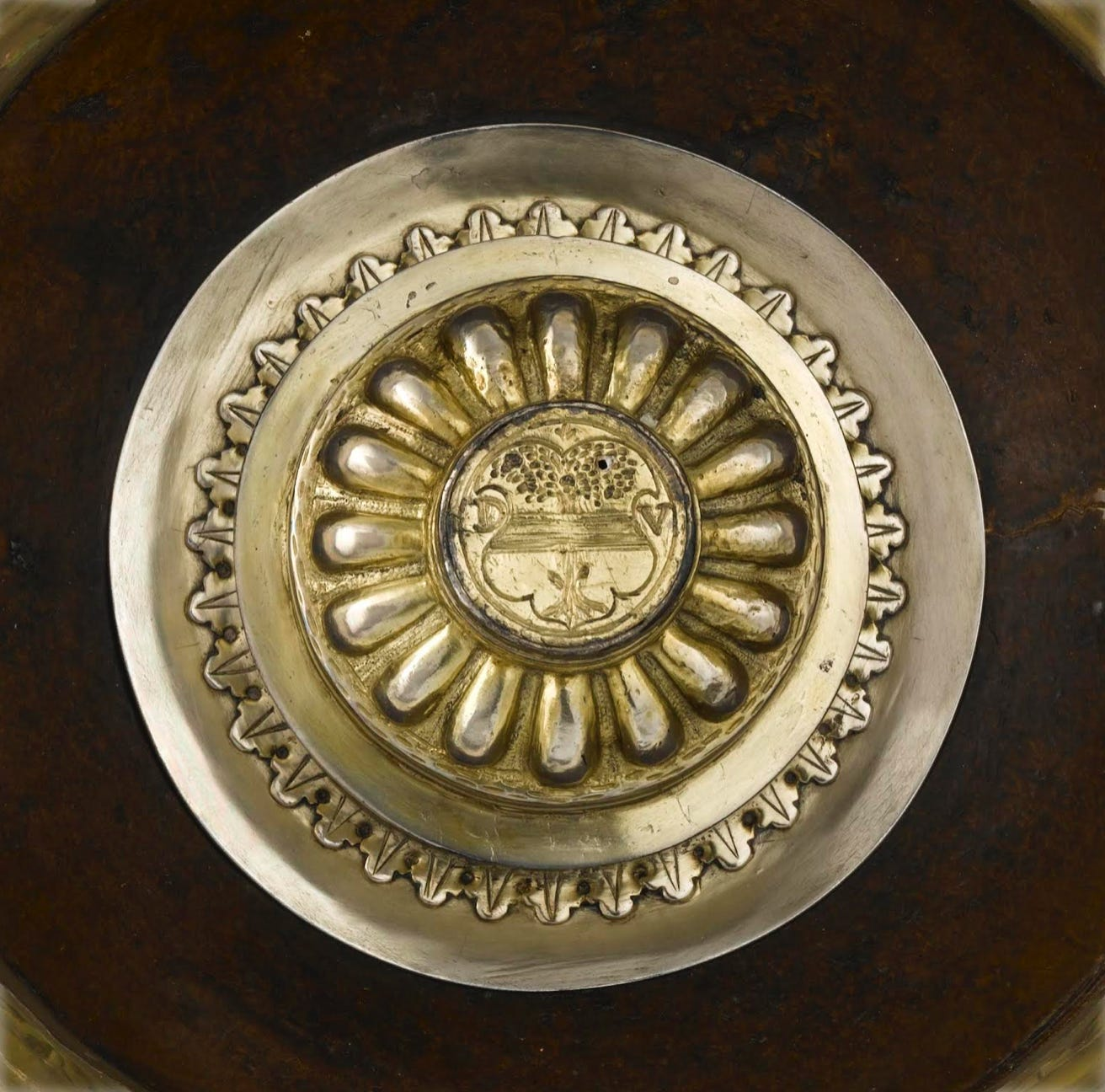
Engraved centre with the arms and initials of David Watson of Saughton.

== Clan Watson Today ==
The Clan Watson Society has started a campaign to find the surviving heirs of the Watsons of Saughton, and has been working closely with both Clan Buchanan society and Clan Forbes in regards to their use of Watson as a sept.
