= Coronation of Queen Mary =

Coronation of Queen Mary may refer to:

- Coronation of Mary, Queen of Scots in 1543
- Coronation of Mary I of England in 1553
- Coronation of Mary of Modena in 1685
- Coronation of Mary of Teck in 1911
