= Cramond Brig Tournament =

Tournament information
- Location: Cammo, Edinburgh, Scotland
- Established: 1912
- Course(s): Cramond Brig Golf Club
- Final year: 1912

Final champion
- Ted Ray

Location in Scotland

The Cramond Brig Tournament was a professional golf tournament held on Monday 17 June 1912 at Cramond Brig Golf Club at Cammo near Edinburgh, Scotland. It was 36-hole stroke play invitation event with over £120 in prize money.

The tournament was played just before the 1912 Open Championship at nearby Muirfield and attracted a strong field. The England–Scotland Professional Match was held the following day with Open qualifying on the three days after that. Although Harry Vardon and James Braid were playing an exhibition match on the same day and J. H. Taylor and Arnaud Massy were absent, most of the other leading professionals competed, about 140 playing. In order for such a large field to play 36 holes in one day, a cut was used; only those scoring 75 or better in the first round being allowed to play in the second.

Ted Ray won the tournament with rounds of 63 and 70, two ahead of Rowland Jones. Charles Mayo was third a further two shots behind, with George Duncan, Fred Leach and Robert Thomson tied for fourth. Ray scored a course record 63 in the morning round to lead by three from Jones. Ray had a bad front half of 38 in the afternoon but came home in 32. Jones, out in 36, was level with Ray at the turn but couldn't match him on the back-9 and finished two behind.

Ray also won the Open Championship the following week, for which he also won a first prize of £50.

== Winners ==
Year	Winners	Country	Venue	Score	Margin of victory	Runner-up	Winner's share (£)	Ref
1912	Ted Ray	Jersey	Cramond Brig Golf Club	133	2 strokes	(England) Rowland Jones	50	
