= Alexander Charles Stephen =

Scottish zoologist

Dr Alexander Charles Stephen FRSE PRPSE (17 December 1893 – 3 June 1966) was a 20th-century Scottish zoologist.

== Life ==
He was born on 17 December 1893 in Garvock manse, near Laurencekirk in Aberdeenshire the son of Rev William Stephen. He was educated at the Edinburgh Institution and Robert Gordon's College. His studies of Chemistry and Zoology at Aberdeen University were interrupted by the First World War during which he served with the Special Brigade of the Royal Engineers and was gassed during the First Battle of the Somme in 1916. He served further at Ypres before being called back to Britain in 1917 to apply his knowledge working in the Chemical Warfare Research Department in London.

Resuming his studies at Aberdeen after the war he graduated BSc in 1919. He served on the staff of the Fishery Board for Scotland 1920 to 1925 before gaining a position as Assistant Curator at the Royal Scottish Museum in Edinburgh, being promoted to Keeper of the Museum in 1935. He spent the rest of his working life in this role.

In 1929 he was elected a Fellow of the Royal Society of Edinburgh. His proposers were James Ritchie, Sir John Arthur Thomson, Percy Hall Grimshaw, and James Hartley Ashworth. He was also President of the Royal Physical Society of Edinburgh and President of the Astronomical Society of Edinburgh.

He retired in 1958 and died at home, 17 Cammo Crescent in north-west Edinburgh, on 3 June 1966.

== Family ==
In 1936 he married Ann Borthwick.

== Publications ==
- Phyla, Sipincula and Echiura (1972)
