= Coronation of Mary, Queen of Scots =

1543 coronation in Scotland

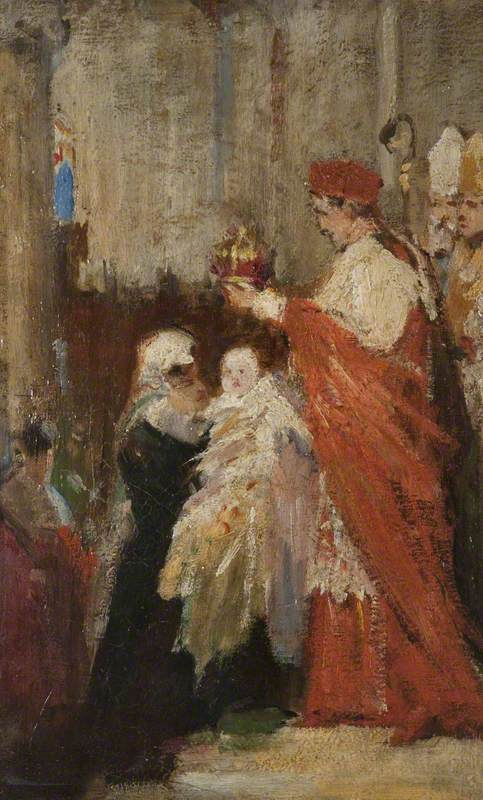
The Crowning of Mary, Queen of Scots by William Ewart Lockhart

Mary, Queen of Scots (1542–1587), the daughter of James V of Scotland and Mary of Guise, was crowned as Queen of Scotland in the Chapel Royal at Stirling Castle on 9 September 1543. Details of the event are sparse, though contemporary accounts describe a procession of nobles bearing the regalia and festivities including pageants and dancing. Mary was later forced to abdicate following the battle of Carberry Hill.

== Background ==
Mary's father, James V, died in December 1542 six days after Mary's birth. James Hamilton, 2nd Earl of Arran, was appointed Regent of Scotland to rule on her behalf. The coronation took place amid political tensions between Arran and Cardinal Beaton over Scottish policy toward England.

The crown jewels used in the coronation ritual (which survive) are known as the Honours of Scotland, crown jewels that survive to this day. After the death of James V, his servant John Tennent delivered the late king's crown, sceptre, and sword of honour to Arran's representatives William Baillie of Lamington and John Kirkcaldy.

Mary and her mother remained at Linlithgow Palace. Arran's rule and his policies, especially his pursuit of an English alliance, were challenged by Cardinal Beaton. It was planned to move Mary to Stirling Castle. First, a standoff between the two factions was settled by mediation at Kirkliston. Mary came to Stirling on 27 July 1543.

== Coronation at Stirling Castle ==
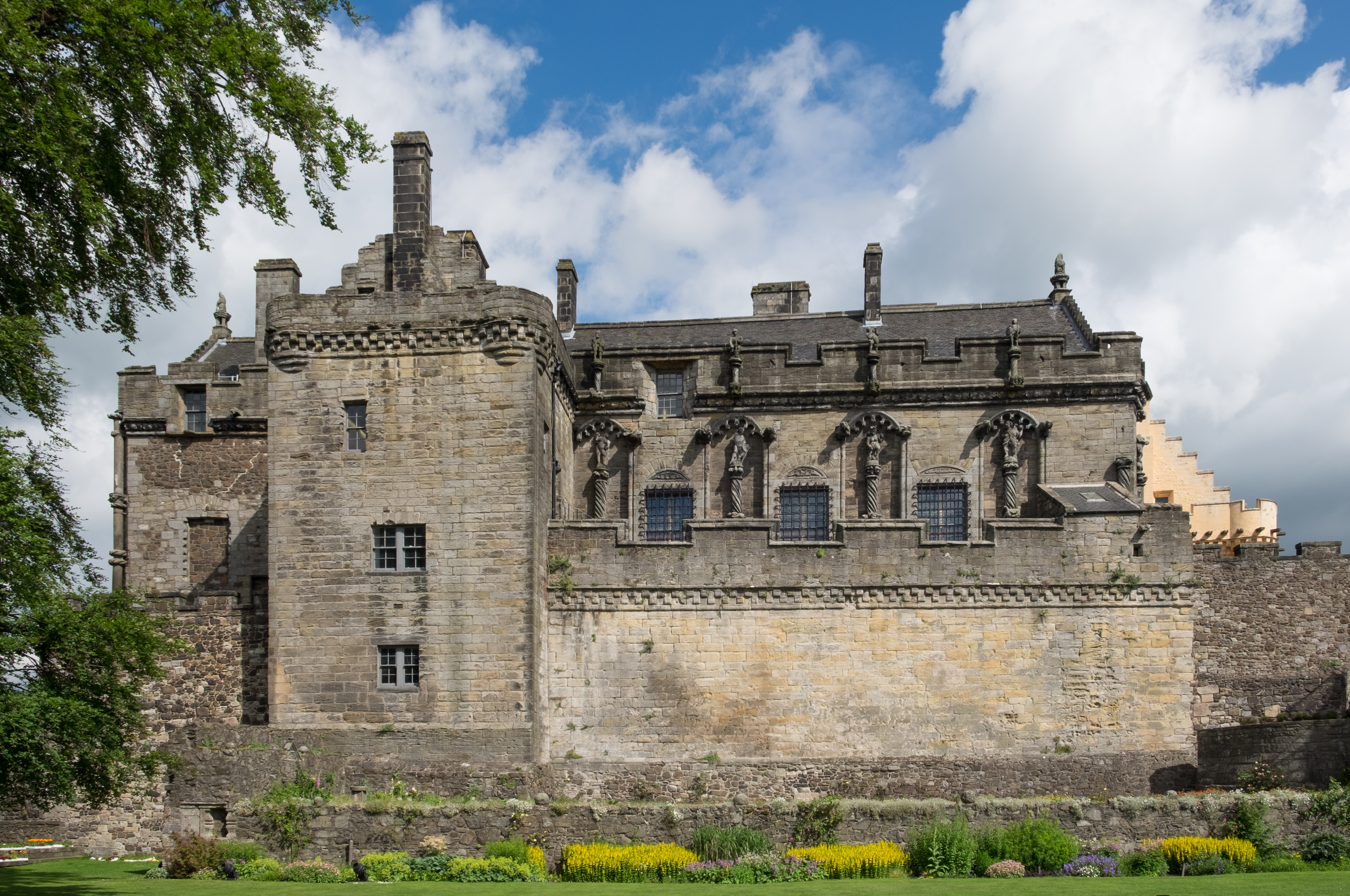
Mary was crowned at Stirling Castle, where her father had recently built a new palace.

Only a little is known of the ceremony and celebrations at Stirling Castle. A few details of the preparations are known from the household books of Mary of Guise, which mention some food for the day and the preparation and cleaning of silverware. An English diplomat, Ralph Sadler, who was following events in Scotland suggested the ceremony was not very costly. The English herald Henry Ray was his representative at the event.

According to reports sent to William Parr and a later narrative by Mary's secretary Claude Nau, in the coronation procession, Regent Arran held the crown, the Earl of Lennox held the sceptre, and Campbell of Argyll held the sword of estate. The role played by Mary of Guise was not recorded, but she may have appeared in her own coronation robes.

According to the Scottish chronicle writer, Robert Lindsay of Pitscottie, there were pageants and dancing at the castle. Pitscottie mistakenly dates the event to 20 August, writing that the Scottish nobility came to Stirling to celebrate the coronation of the young queen and danced with the French ladies in waiting, in Scots:

convenit with the young quein with gret solempnitie, trieumphe, plays, phrassis [farces, comedies], and bankatting and greit danceing befor the quene [Mary of Guise] with greit lordis and Frinche ladyis.

=== Abdication and revocation ===
After the battle of Carberry Hill, Mary was forced to abdicate at Lochleven Castle and her son was crowned as James VI. Mary escaped from Lochleven, and at Hamilton in May 1568 made a revocation declaring she had not abdicated. A subsequent declaration made in 1568 refers to her as Queen of Scotland and the symbolic power of the Honours of Scotland, "being lawfully elected, crowned, invested, and inaugurated thereinto; and having the same and whole inhabitants and subjects thereof under perfect obedience of our royal sceptre, princely crown and sword, continually since our coronation".
