= West Kent Invitation Tournament =

Professional golf tournament

Tournament information
- Location: Bickley, Kent, England
- Established: 1925
- Course(s): West Kent Golf Club
- Final year: 1925

Final champion
- Ted Ray

Location in England

The West Kent Invitation Tournament was a professional golf tournament held on 10 October 1925 at West Kent Golf Club near Bickley, Kent, England. It was 36-hole stroke play invitation event with a total of £200 in prize money. 18 professionals competed, including most of the leading British golfers.

Ted Ray won the tournament with rounds of 72 and 71, three ahead of Arthur Havers. Abe Mitchell was third, a further shot behind, with Fred Robson fourth and George Gadd fifth. Mitchell was challenging Ray, his playing partner, after reaching the turn in 34. However he took 40 for the last 9 holes to Ray's 36.

== Winners ==
Year	Winners	Country	Venue	Score	Margin of victory	Runner-up	Winner's share (£)	Ref
1925	Ted Ray	Jersey	West Kent Golf Club	143	3 strokes	(England) Arthur Havers	75	
