= Scottish coronation of Charles II =

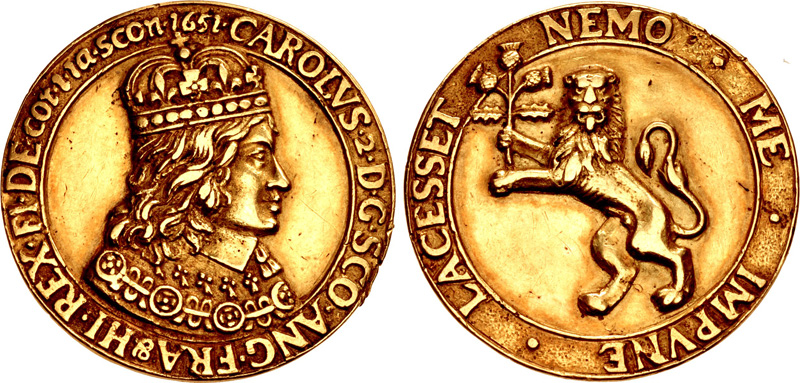
- Gold 1651 coronation medal
- Date: 1 January 1651
- Location: Scone Palace, Perth, Scotland
- Participants: King Charles II; Lord Chancellor of Scotland; Peers of the Realm

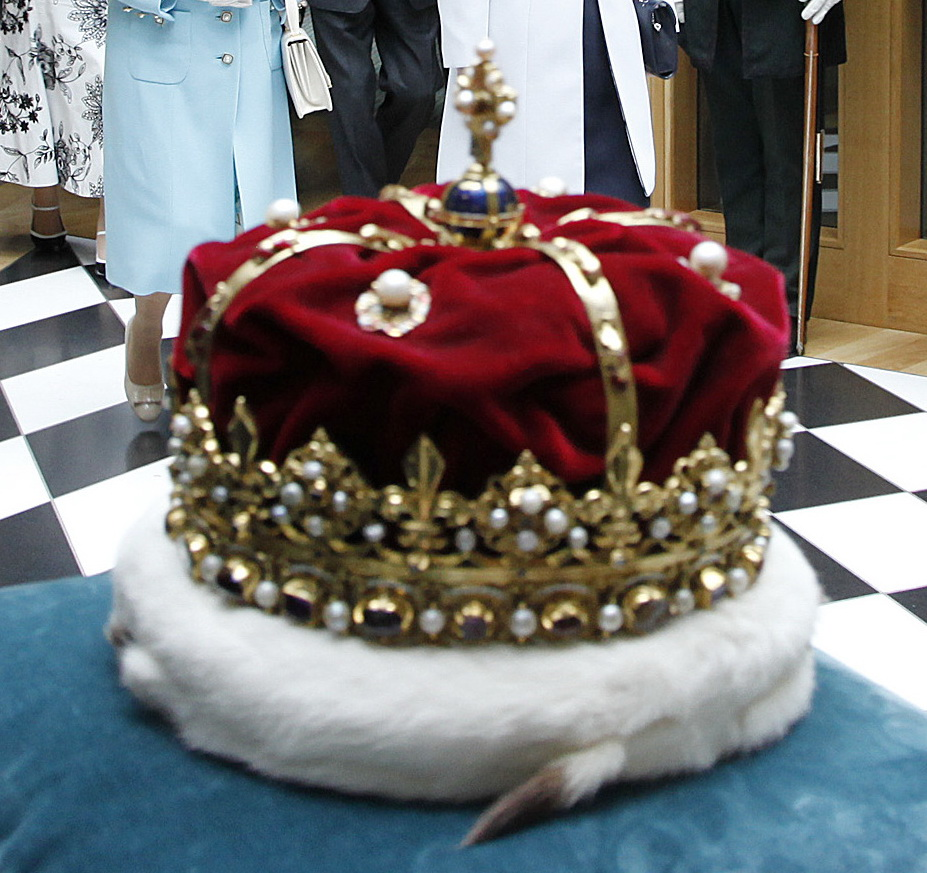
The crown used at Scone in 1651 was remodelled in 1540 by the goldsmith John Mosman

Charles II (1630–1685) was crowned King of Scotland and his other kingdoms at Scone Palace on 1 January 1651. His father, Charles I, had been executed in London at Whitehall Palace on 30 January 1649. Charles arrived in Scotland in June 1650 where there was support for his rule following the Treaty of Breda. Charles resided at old Gowrie House in Perth and held meetings in the summer house by the Tay. The master of the Scottish mint was ordered to strike or cast medallions called "coronation pieces". On Christmas Day 1650, the herald James Balfour announced the discovery of an original manuscript signed by Robert the Bruce in 1326 entailing the Scottish crown to the Stuart dynasty.

== Ceremony ==
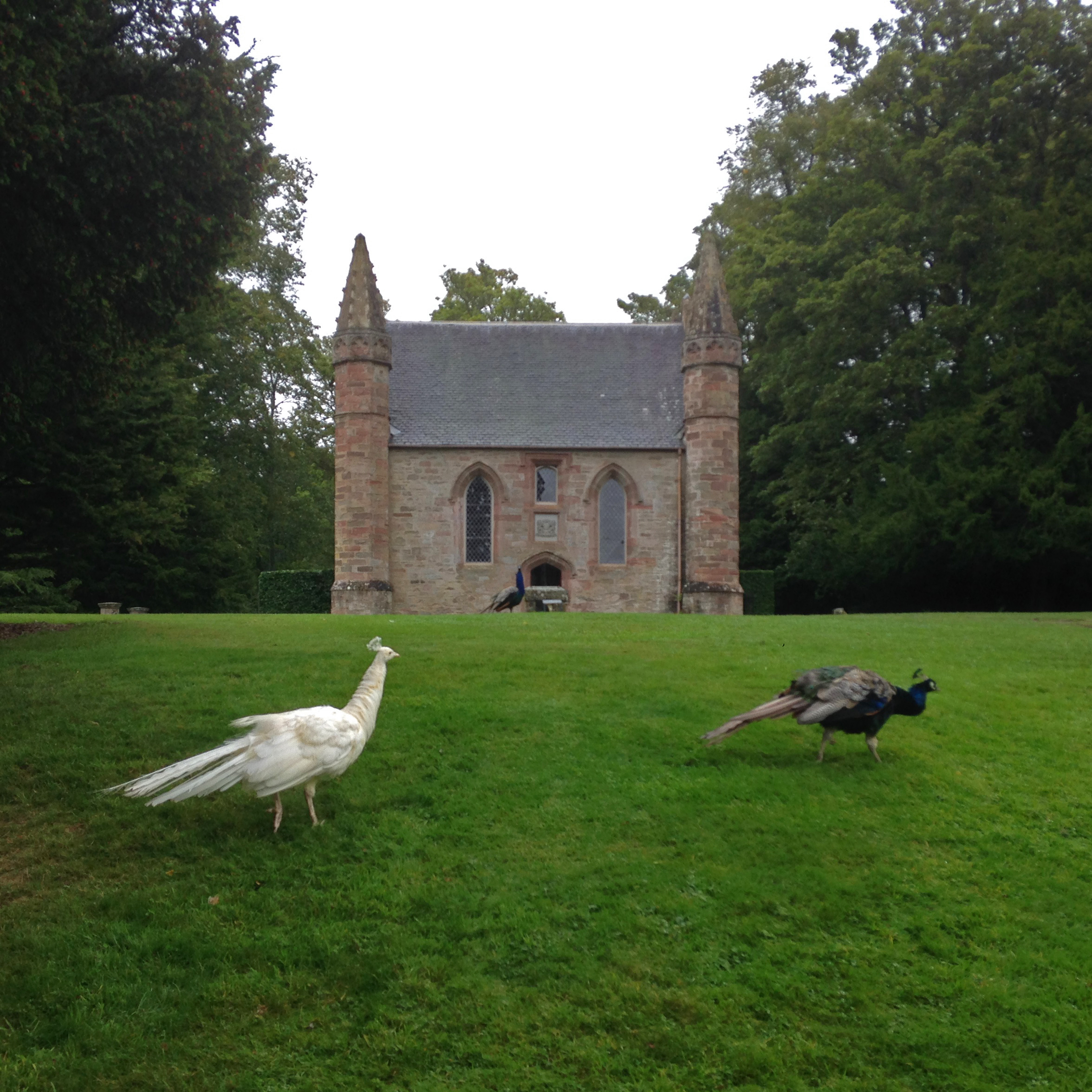
The Moot Hill Chapel at Scone Palace is a remnant of the old parish church.

Charles travelled the short distance to Scone on 31 December. The next day, he dressed in the robe of a prince. He sat under a canopy or cloth estate in his audience chamber, the hall of Scone Palace. There was a procession to the nearby chapel at Moot Hill. The Honours of Scotland were placed on a table beside him during a sermon given by Robert Douglas. The hour-long sermon (subsequently printed) noted a requirement for the monarch to respect the Presbyterian and Covenantal cause.

Charles made his coronation oath, including a commitment to uphold the National Covenant and Solemn League and Covenant. He was then seated on a throne on a raised dais and was crowned by John Campbell, 1st Earl of Loudoun, Lord Chancellor of Scotland, and Archibald Campbell, Marquess of Argyll, assisted by Alexander Montgomery, Earl of Eglinton, with John Leslie, Duke of Rothes, who carried the sword and John Lindsay, Earl of Crawford and Lindsay who carried the sceptre. Charles was proclaimed king of Scotland, England, France, and Ireland.

As was traditional, the ancestry of Charles back to King Fergus was recited by James Balfour, as the Lyon King of Arms. After the ceremonies in the chapel there was a banquet in the palace. Charles knighted some Perthshire lairds on 2 January, then returned to Perth.

Although this contested ceremony in time of conflict is assumed to have been relatively subdued, there are records of significant expenditure especially on provisions for the banquet. These included salmon, calves' heads, and partridges with Bordeaux and Burgundy wine. 205 pounds of sugar were supplied by John Meine in Edinburgh. Some sugar confections were dyed with an ounce of cochineal. Some of the costs were met by James Murray, 2nd Earl of Annandale and Viscount Stormont, the owner of Scone, as well as the official "Board of the Green Cloth" hosting the king which was allowed a half month's costs in advance to meet coronation expenses. Torches were bought in Perth, and Mary Durham the "house laundress" made napkins, 38 from a length of damask linen bought in Kirkcaldy for the king's table, and 54 from "dornick" linen for the lord's table. Some of the napkins were embroidered with the royal cipher "CR", possibly by the seamstress Mistress Dorothy Cheffinch.

Scone Palace was rebuilt from 1803. The present long gallery is said to be on the site of a long gallery of the time of James VI and I, which was decorated with hunting scenes painted in tempera. The parish church was removed from its site on Moot Hill leaving the aisle with the monument to David Murray.
