= Adam Leys =

Scottish goldsmith

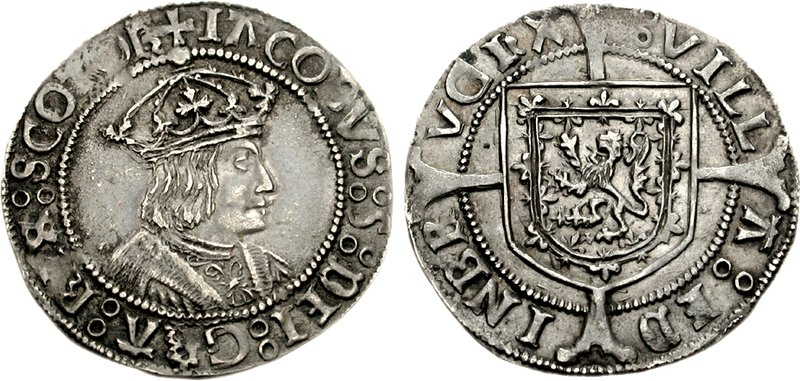
Adam Leys refashioned the crown of Scotland for James V

Adam Leys or Leis was a Scottish goldsmith based in Edinburgh. He worked for James V of Scotland and, in the 1530s, repaired and refashioned the Scottish crown jewels known as the Honours of Scotland. James V gave him a house at the royal mint as a reward for his services.

== Works ==
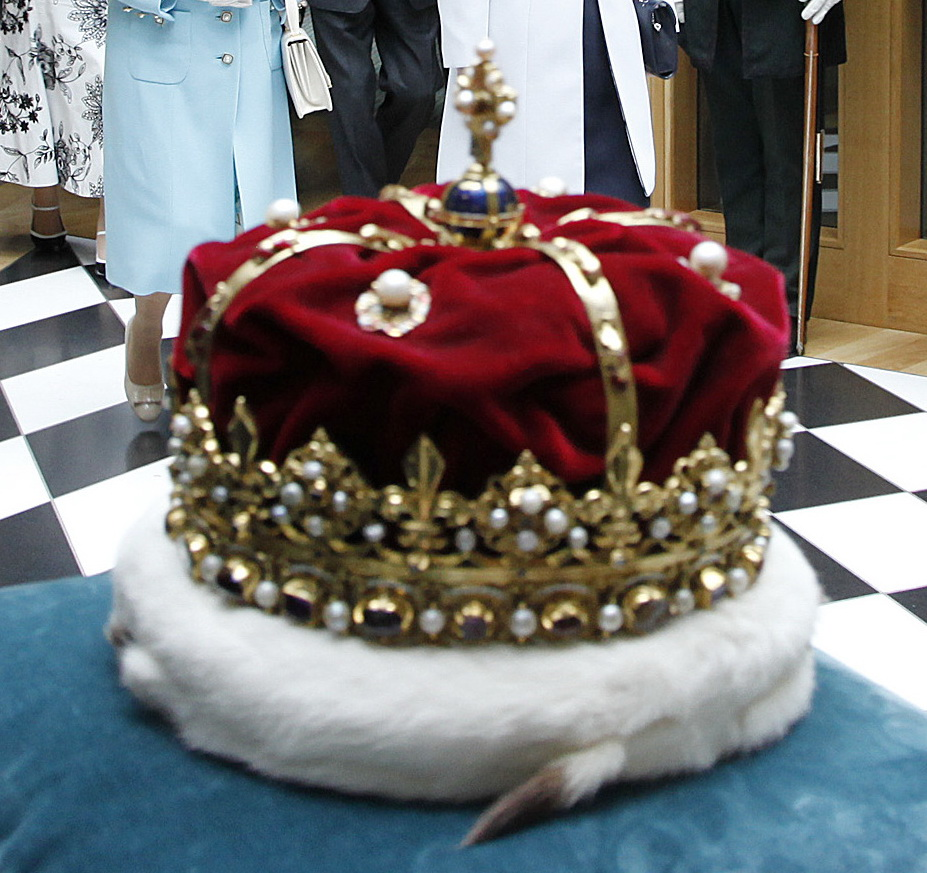
The present crown of Scotland may include pieces made by Adam Leys.

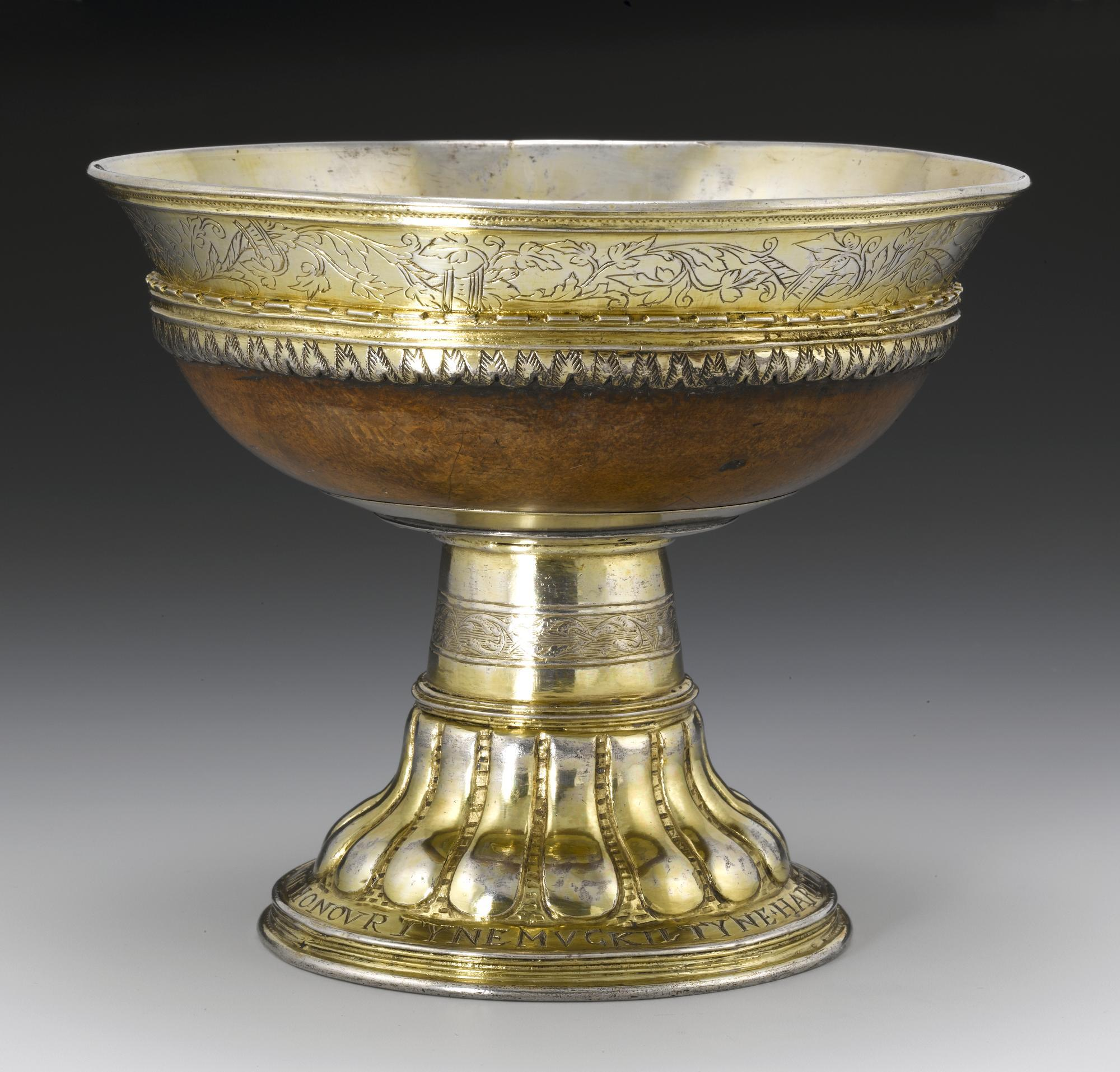
The Watson mazer (NMS) has been associated with Adam Leys.

In 1530, Adam Leys made a silver chandelier or candleholder for Edinburgh's town council, probably for St Giles' Kirk. He made a silver chalice for James V's almoner in August 1535. On a larger scale, Leys worked on panels of royal heraldry and a "great image" of Saint Andrew to be carved and cast in lead for Holyrood Palace. Leys added the arms of Mary of Guise beneath the saint for her Royal Entry to Edinburgh.

James V employed Adam Leys to repair and augment the crown of Scotland in 1532 and 1536. The treasurer's accounts mention that he added new "spryngis" in 1532. It is perhaps unclear which elements these were, but the record may refer to new Imperial-style arches. In October 1533, James Hamilton of Finnart was paid for three ounces of gold used to repair the crown. The crown was comprehensively reworked again by John Mosman in January 1540, into the form it has today.

Leys also worked on the Sword of Honour, a gift from Pope Julius II, and the silver sceptre, a gift to James IV from Pope Alexander VI in 1494, which he extended from around 53 to 86 cm (21 to 34 in) and gilded. He seems to have cast new elements moulded from the Italian originals. These works to the Honours were probably in connection with ceremonies planned for James V's bride, Madeleine of Valois. The royal accounts recorded these works in the Scots language as:

- Item, deliverit to the said James [Achesoun] to Adam Leis, goldsmyth, to mend the sword of honour, thre unce of Inglis grotis
- Item deliverit to Adam Leys, goldsmyth, xj unce and ane half of silver, attour the auld sceptour of silver weyand xv unce, to mak ane new sceptour of [silver]
- Item, for gold to gilt the samin [same].

Leys made an engraved silver seal for David Beaton in 1539.

== Marriage and a house at the mint ==
Adam Leys married Marjorie Edmonstoun. After his death, the date of which is unknown, on 2 December 1561 Mary, Queen of Scots, confirmed her possession of gifts awarded to Marjorie and her late husband for his service to her father James V and to herself, including the house she occupied at the Scottish mint or "cunzie hous" in Edinburgh. The mint at this period was close to the Palace of Holyrood. The gift of the house was made by James V, and confirmed by Mary of Guise in July 1554 when she was Regent of Scotland and Adam was still alive.

The property was adjacent to the house of the Master Coiner James Achesoun and the mint yard, perhaps indicating that some of Adam's work was connected with the coinage. James Achesoun was involved in supplying the gold Adam Leys used to mend the crown.
