= Sceptre of Scotland =

Symbolic sceptre used in Scottish ceremonies

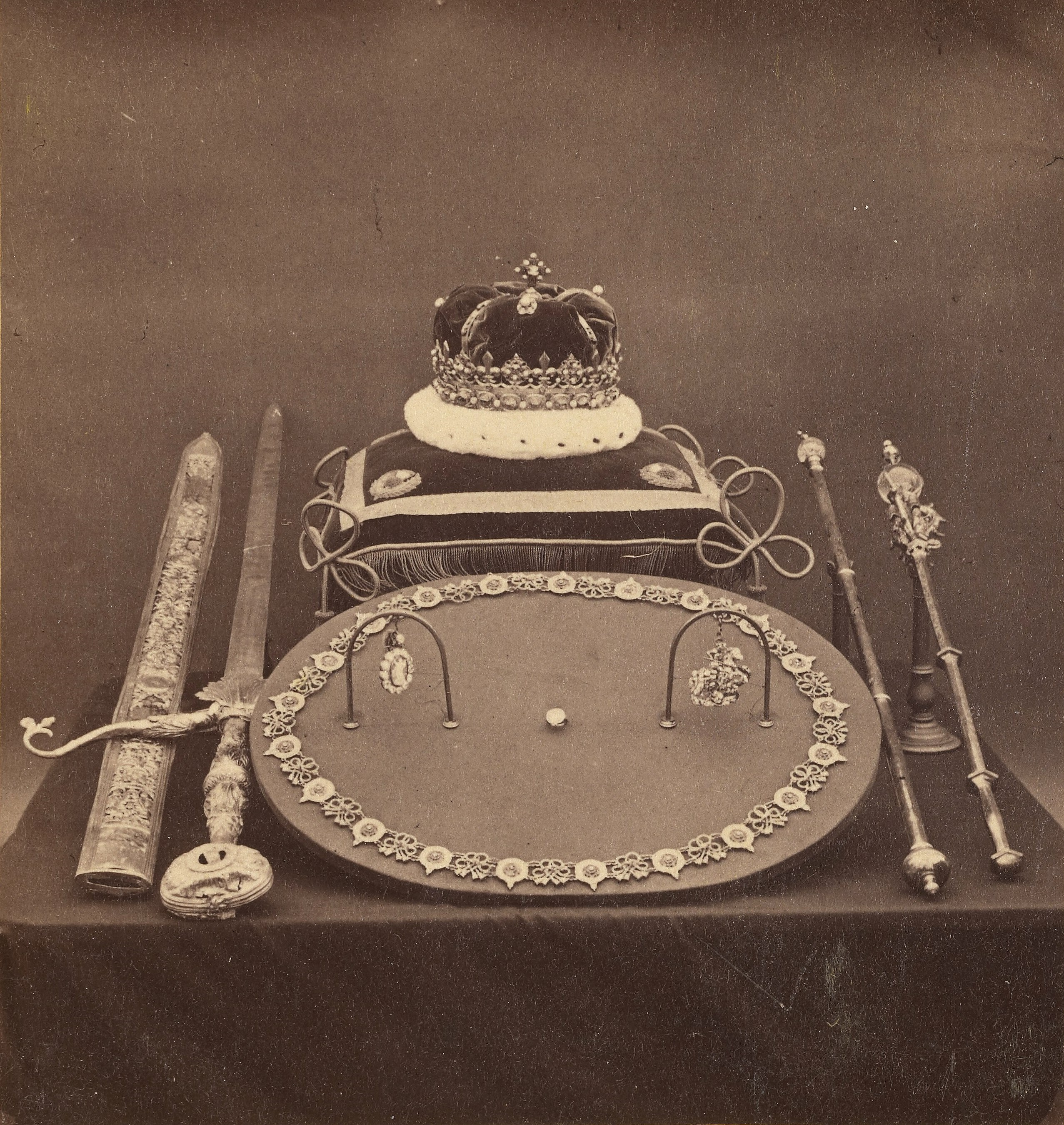
Far left: The Scabbard; Left: The Sword of State; Centre: The Crown and Stewart Jewels; Right: The Wand; Far right: The Sceptre

The Sceptre of Scotland, is a symbolic ornamental rod held by the Scottish monarchs at their coronation, and as one of the Honours of Scotland, was carried in procession at the opening and closing ceremonies of Parliament of Scotland. It is now displayed at Edinburgh Castle.

== History and description ==
The sceptre was a gift from Pope Alexander VI to James IV in 1494. This papal gift replaced a native-made sceptre which dated from the 14th century at the earliest, and which has been lost.

The silver-gilt sceptre was made in Italy. It was remodelled and lengthened for James V in 1536 by the Edinburgh goldsmith Adam Leys, and is now 86 cm (2.8 ft) long. The shaft or rod is engraved with grotesques, urns, leaves, thistles, and fleurs-de-lis. The finial features stylised dolphins (symbols of the Church), and three figures under canopies: the Virgin Mary wearing a crown and holding the infant Jesus in her right arm and an orb in her left hand; Saint James the Great holding a book and a staff; and Saint Andrew holding a book and a saltire. The finial is topped by a globe of polished rock crystal, surmounted with a golden globe topped by a large pearl.

The sceptre was used with the other Honours of Scotland for many great ceremonies of state. Often, the names of the aristocrats who carried the sceptre were recorded. The Earl of Lennox carried the sceptre at the coronation of Mary, Queen of Scots, at Stirling in 1543. When Mary, Queen of Scots, opened Parliament on 26 May 1563, the Earl of Argyll carried the sceptre. On 14 April 1567, Mary went to Parliament escorted by her guard of archers, and James Hepburn, 4th Earl of Bothwell was given the role of holding the sceptre.

== War of the Three Kingdoms ==
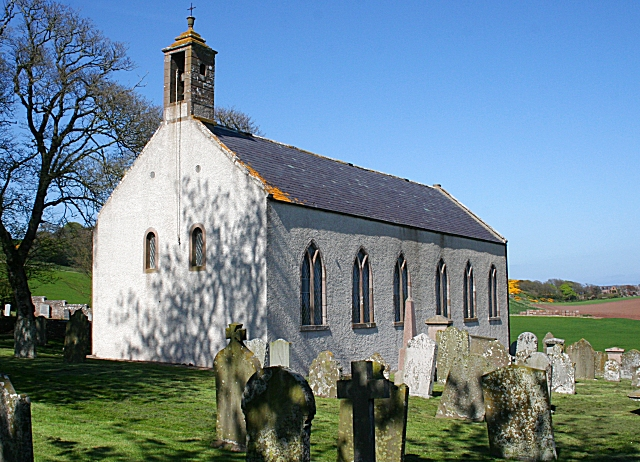
The Honours of Scotland were hidden at Kinneff Old Kirk

At the Scottish coronation of Charles II at Scone Palace on 1 January 1651, John Lindsay, Earl of Crawford and Lindsay carried the sceptre. As the War of Three Kingdoms progressed, the Honours were taken to Dunnotar Castle, and subsequently the crown and sceptre were buried for a time near the pulpit of Kinneff Old Kirk by James Granger (or Grainger) and his wife Christian Fletcher.

== Use in the Act of Union ratification ==
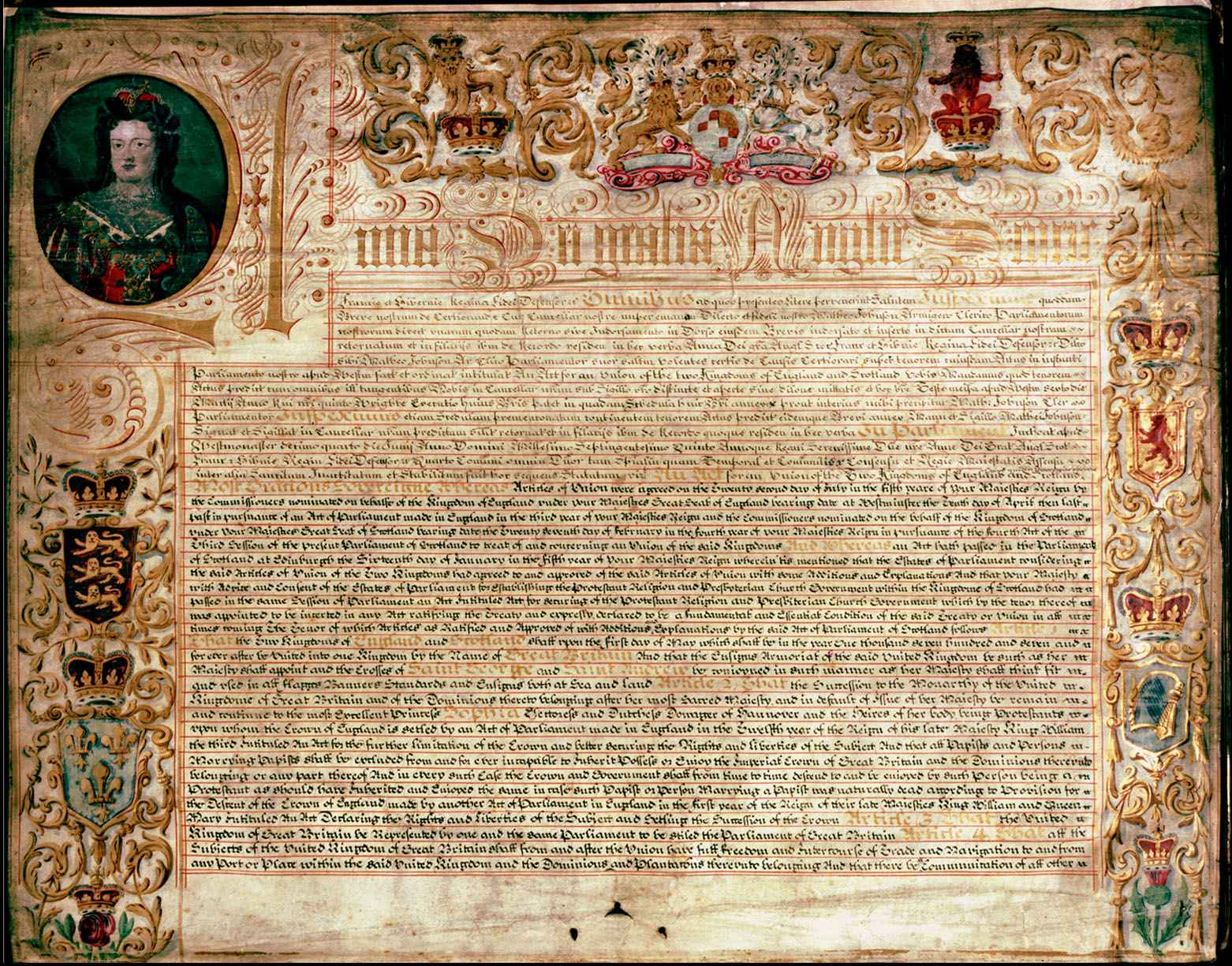
The exemplification of the Act of Union is held by the National Records of Scotland.

The sceptre was used at the ratification of the Act of Union at the Parliament of Scotland on 1 May 1707. James Douglas, 2nd Duke of Queensberry, or the Earl of Seafield, acting as Queen Anne's commissioner, touched the document with the sceptre. Afterwards it was locked away with the other Honours of Scotland in the Crown Room at Edinburgh Castle. The document seems to have been the exemplification of the treaty sent to Scotland, presented to the Parliament in Edinburgh by Queensberry on 19 March 1707, and now held by the National Records of Scotland.

In 1794, the "Crown Room" at Edinburgh Castle was thought also to be a repository of archival records, which could be removed to the new General Register House. The room was opened and the chest containing the Honours of Scotland was seen to be intact.

== The Wand of Scotland ==
When the Honours of Scotland were retrieved from a chest in Edinburgh Castle's crown room in 1818, unexpectedly a second silver sceptre was discovered. Its finial encloses a rock crystal topped with a cross. This other sceptre does not seem to feature in the archival record and its purpose is unknown or uncertain. It has been suggested that it was a sceptre, rod, or mace used by the Treasurer of Scotland, or that it was made for a queen consort. It has a maker's mark "F.G" which has not been identified. The second sceptre is usually known as the "wand" to avoid confusion, and is also displayed in the crown room at Edinburgh Castle.

John Mosman made a sceptre for Mary of Guise, wife of James V, but it is known to have had a finial of a different form, shaped like a hand. The hand was a traditional French symbol of monarchy and authority, the main de justice. This sceptre does not survive.
