= Honours of Scotland =

Regalia worn by Scottish monarchs

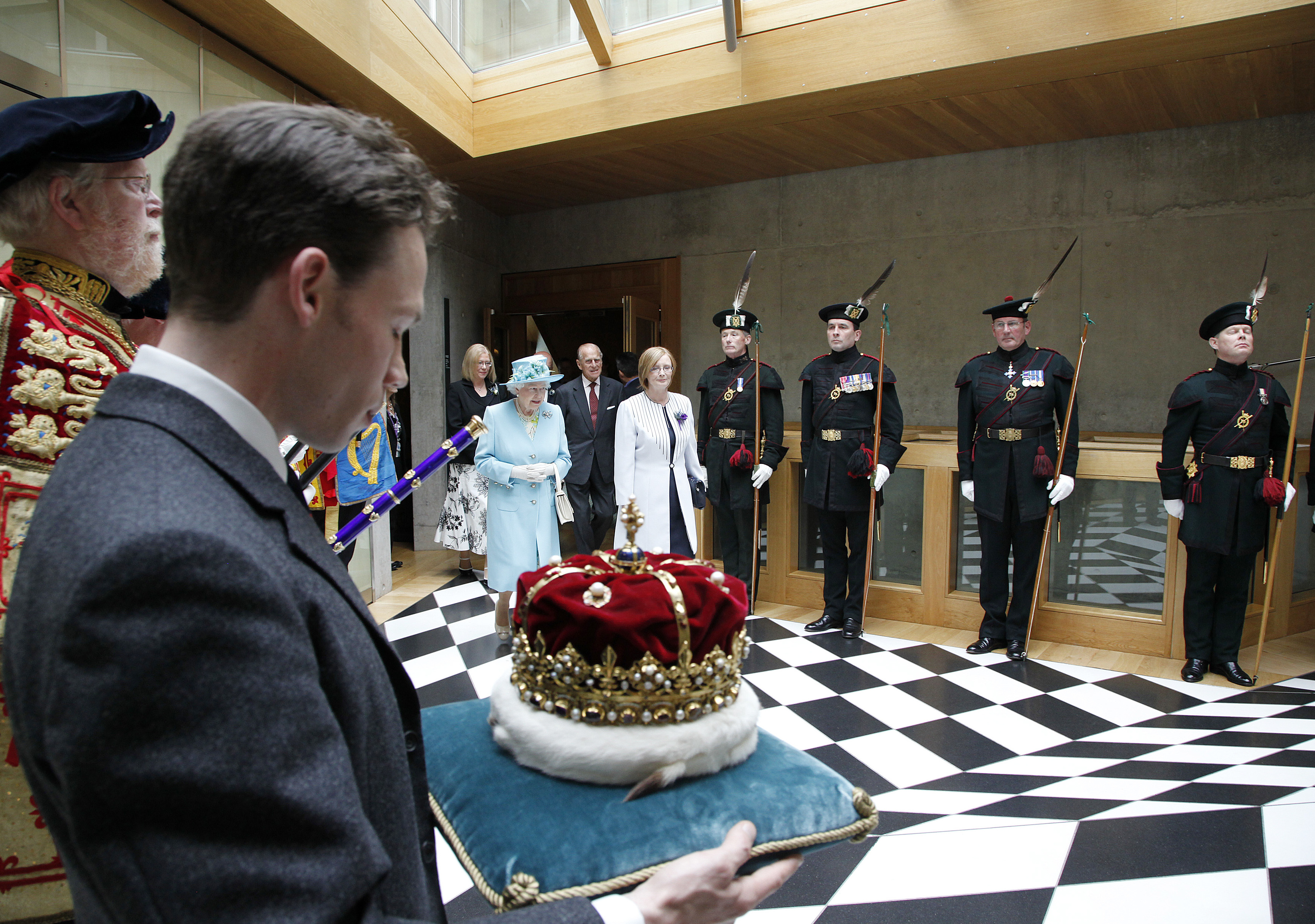
- The Crown of Scotland at the Royal Opening of the Scottish Parliament in 2011

Overview
- Country: Scotland
- Location: Crown Room at Edinburgh Castle
- Size: 3 objects: 1 crown (1540); 1 sceptre (c. 1494); 1 sword (1507)
- Owner: Commissioners for the Keeping of the Regalia
- Managers: Historic Environment Scotland
- Website: edinburghcastle.scot/honours

The Honours of Scotland (Scots: Honours o Scotland, Scottish Gaelic: Seudan a' Chrùin Albannaich), informally known as the Scottish Crown Jewels, are the regalia that were worn by Scottish monarchs at their coronation. Kept in the Crown Room in Edinburgh Castle, they date from the 15th and 16th centuries, and are the oldest surviving set of crown jewels in the British Isles.

The Honours were used together for the coronation of Scottish monarchs from Mary, Queen of Scots in 1543 until Charles II in 1651. From the Union of the Crowns in 1603 until the Union of 1707, the Honours were present at sittings of the Parliament of Scotland to signify the presence of the monarch and their acceptance of the power of Parliament. From at least the 16th century the monarch (or the Lord High Commissioner) signified the granting of Royal Assent by their touching the final printed copy of an Act of Parliament with the Sceptre during a meeting of the Parliament.

Following the Union of 1707, the Honours were locked away in a chest in Edinburgh Castle and the Crown Jewels of England continued to be used by British monarchs as the Crown Jewels of the United Kingdom. The Honours were rediscovered in 1818 and have been on public display at Edinburgh Castle ever since. The Honours have been used at state occasions including the visit of George IV in 1822, Elizabeth II's first visit to Scotland as monarch in 1953, and a national service of thanksgiving for Charles III following his coronation in 2023. The Crown of Scotland is present at each Opening Ceremony of the Scottish Parliament.

The Honours of Scotland consist of the Crown of Scotland, the Sceptre, and the Sword of State. The gold crown was made in Scotland and, in its present form, dates from 1540. The sword and sceptre were made in Italy as gifts to James IV from the pope. The Honours also appear on the crest of the Royal Coat of Arms of Scotland and on the Scottish version of the Royal Coat of Arms of the United Kingdom, where the red lion of the King of Scots is depicted wearing the crown and holding the sword and sceptre. Coronation robes, a pair of spurs, a ring and consort crowns were also part of the Scottish regalia, none of which survives today. The gold ampulla of Charles I that held anointing oil at his 1633 coronation now belongs to the National Museum of Scotland.

The Crown Room in Edinburgh Castle also contains the Elizabeth Sword, a silver-gilt wand, the 17th-century Stewart Jewels (which were added in 1830), and the Lorne Jewels, which were bequeathed to Scotland by Princess Louise, Duchess of Argyll, in 1939.

== History ==
=== Early history ===
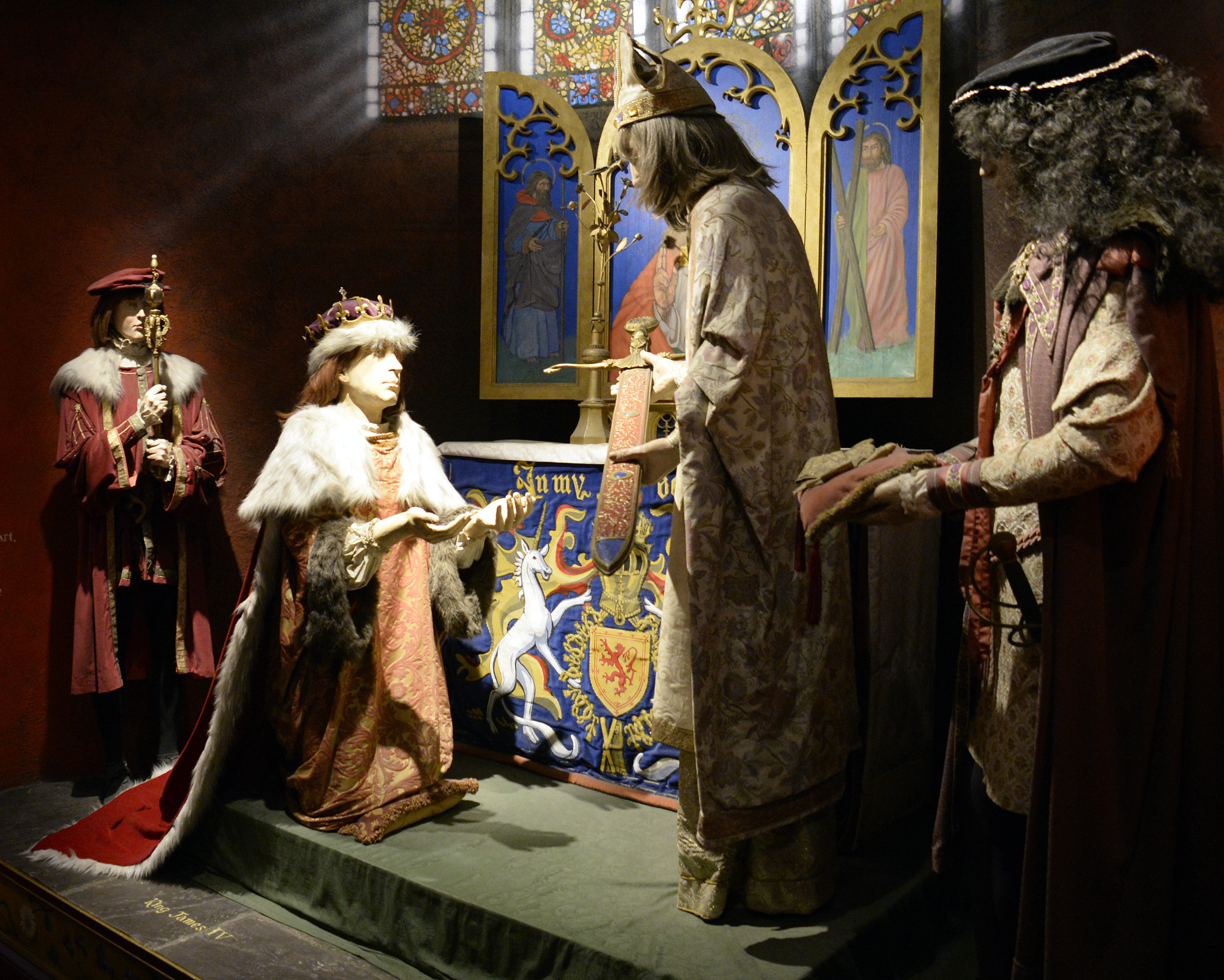
James IV with his regalia in 1507. Tableau at Edinburgh Castle.

In the earliest known depiction of a Scottish king wearing his symbols of sovereignty, King Edgar (reigned 1097–1107) wears a crown and bears a sword and a sceptre on his Great Seal. His brother, Alexander I, is shown holding an orb – a pictorial emblem of divine kingship that was not actually part of the Scottish regalia. By the reign of John Balliol, the regalia consisted of a crown, sceptre, sword and ring. After the English invasion in 1296, these regalia and Stone of Scone, upon which monarchs of Scotland were invested and crowned, were captured by the English army and taken south to London.

New regalia were made in the 14th century for subsequent coronations, and though the Crown of Scotland may in its previous form date from this period, the other regalia were gradually replaced by the 16th century with the current set of Honours – consisting of the Crown of Scotland remodelled in 1540, and the Sceptre and Sword of State which were both made in Italy and given to James IV as papal gifts. A consort crown was made in 1539 for Mary of Guise, wife of James V, but it does not survive among the Honours.

The Honours in their present form were first used together at the coronation of Mary, Queen of Scots in 1543. By the second half of the 16th century, they represented royal authority in the Scottish Parliament, and Acts of Parliament were given royal assent when the monarch (or their representatives) touched them with the Sceptre. The Honours were usually kept in Edinburgh Castle, where they remained during the Marian Civil War. Mungo Brady made substitutes for a Parliament at Stirling in 1571. The Honours were found in a chest in a vault or "cave" when Edinburgh Castle surrendered in May 1573. Henry Echlin of Pittadro negotiated the delivery of the Honours to Regent Morton. Morton brought the Honours to Stirling Castle for his Parliament on 15 July 1578, where they were held by the Earls of Angus, Lennox, and Mar.

=== 17th and 18th centuries ===
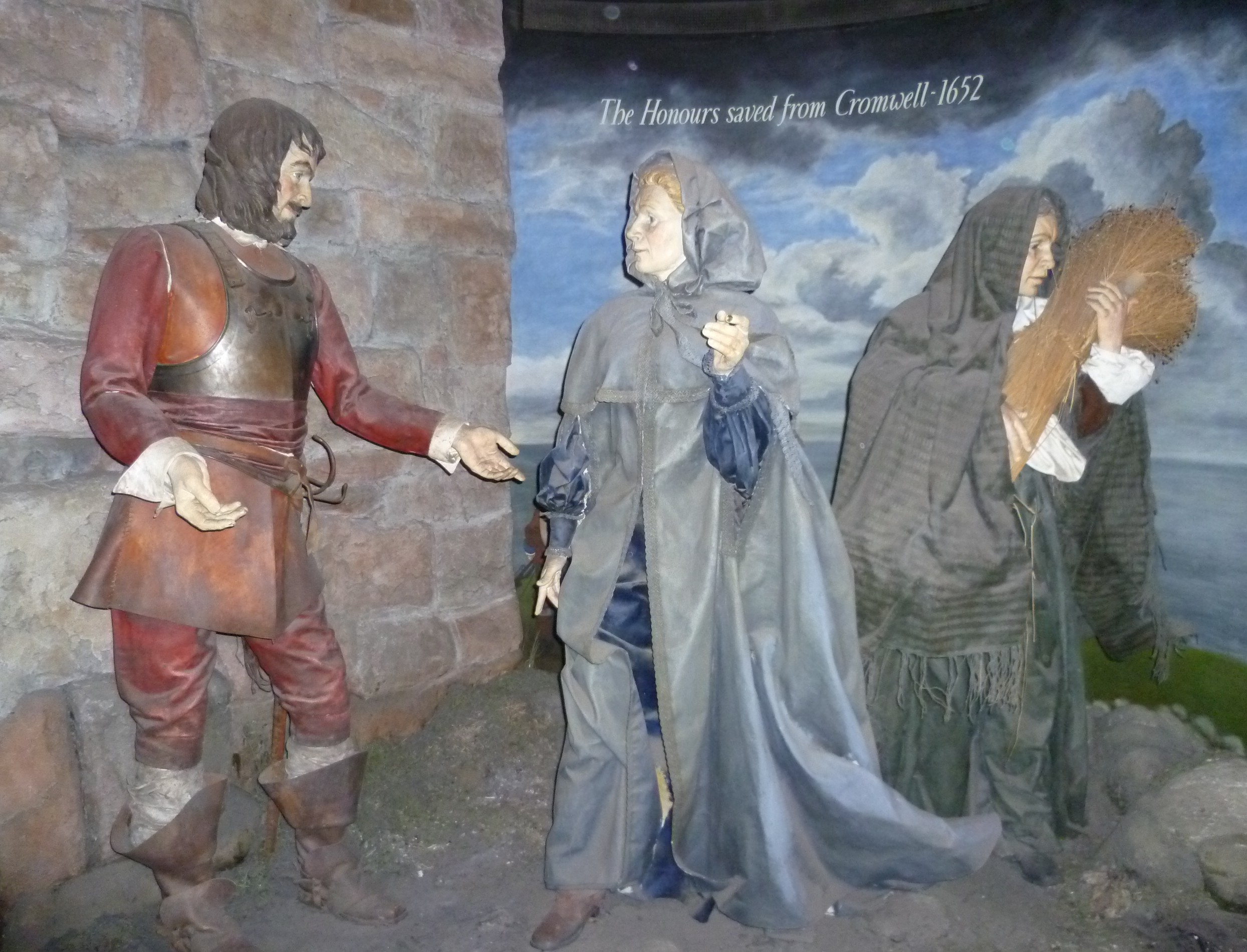
Saving the Honours from Oliver Cromwell. Tableau at Edinburgh Castle.

From the Union of the Crowns in 1603 until the Union of 1707, the Honours were taken to sittings of the Parliament of Scotland to signify the monarch's presence and their acceptance of the power of the Parliament. Spurs – emblems of knighthood and chivalry – were presented to Charles I at his Scottish coronation in 1633; the spurs and coronation robes also have been lost. The Honours were last used at a coronation in 1651, when Charles II was crowned at Scone. As Oliver Cromwell had invaded Scotland the previous year, and Edinburgh Castle had surrendered to his army that December, the Honours could not be returned there. The English Crown Jewels had already been melted down and struck into coins by the Commonwealth. With Cromwell's army fast advancing on Scone, in June 1651 the Privy Council decided to place them at Dunnottar Castle in Kincardineshire, the family seat of the Earl Marischal, the custodian of the Honours.

They were brought to Dunnottar, hidden in sacks of wool, and Sir George Ogilvie of Barras, lieutenant-governor of the castle, was given responsibility for its defence. In November 1651, Cromwell's troops called on Ogilvie to surrender, but he refused. During the subsequent blockade of the castle, the removal of the Honours of Scotland was planned by Elizabeth Douglas, wife of Sir George Ogilvie, and Christian Fletcher, wife of James Granger, minister of Kinneff Parish Church. Two stories exist regarding the removal of the Honours. Fletcher stated in 1664 that over the course of three visits to the castle in February and March 1652, she carried away the crown, sceptre, sword and scabbard hidden amongst sacks of goods. Another account, given in the 18th century by a tutor to the Earl Marischal, records that the honours were lowered from the castle onto the beach, where they were collected by Fletcher's servant and carried off in a creel of seaweed. Having smuggled the honours from the castle, Fletcher and her husband buried them under the floor of the Old Kirk at Kinneff.

At the Restoration of Charles II in 1660, the Honours were removed from Kinneff Old Kirk and returned to Edinburgh Castle. During the debates in the Scottish Parliament from October 1706 to January 1707 on the Treaty of Union, rumour spread that the Honours were to be taken to England and melted down (an obscene song from the post-union period suggested that they were to be melted down to be turned into a set of dildos for Queen Anne). To allay fears over the fate of the Honours, on 14 January 1707 the Parliament amended Article 24 of the Treaty with a clause stating that "... the crown, scepter and sword of state... continue to be keeped as they are in that part of the united kingdome now called Scotland, and that they shall so remain in all tyme coming, notwithstanding of the union." With the adjournment of Parliament on 25 March 1707, the Honours no longer had any practical use. They were taken to the Crown Room in Edinburgh Castle, where they were safely locked away in a great oak chest, and the doorway of the Crown Room was walled up.

=== 19th century ===
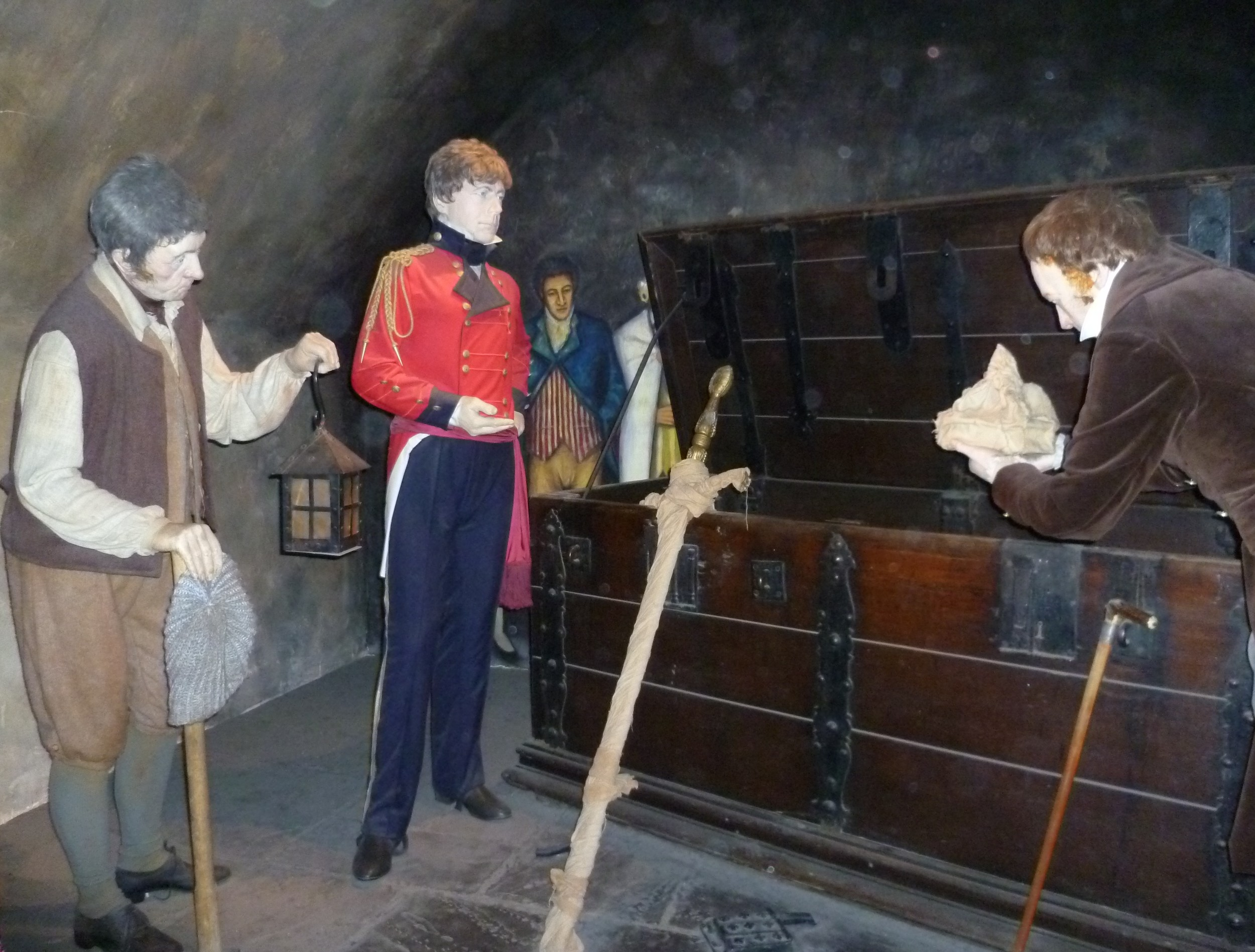
Rediscovering the Honours in 1818. Tableau at Edinburgh Castle.

On 28 October 1817, the Prince Regent issued a royal warrant authorising specified commissioners to break open the walled-up doorway of the Crown Room. The commissioners were: Lord Granton (the Lord President of the Court of Session), Lord Boyle (the Lord Justice Clerk), William Adam (the Lord Chief Commissioner of the Jury Court), Major-General Sir John Hope (the Commander-in-Chief, Scotland), Kincaid Mackenzie (the Lord Provost of Edinburgh), James Wedderburn (Solicitor General), the novelist and historian Walter Scott (in his capacity as Clerk of Session), William Clerk (clerk of the Jury Court), Henry Jardine (Deputy Remembrancer in Exchequer), and Thomas Thomson (Deputy Lord Clerk Register). The commissioners broke into the Crown Room on 4 February 1818. Half expecting to find the oak chest empty, they were relieved to open it and discover the crown, sceptre and sword, wrapped in linen, exactly as they had been left 111 years earlier. The Royal Standard was hoisted above Edinburgh Castle in celebration of the historic moment. Cheers of excitement rippled through the castle, and members of the public gathered outside to hear the news. On 26 May 1819, the Honours went on public display in the Crown Room. They were guarded by two veterans of the Battle of Waterloo dressed in a Jacobean-style Yeoman's outfit.

George IV was crowned king in 1821 and his visit to Scotland the following year was the first by a monarch since 1651. On 12 August 1822, the Honours were escorted in procession to the Palace of Holyroodhouse. There was a carnival atmosphere, with people lining the streets and observing from windows. Three days later, the king arrived at the palace and symbolically touched the regalia. Before leaving the country a week later, he took part in a return procession to the Castle, where the Honours would remain until the 20th century.

=== 20th century and later ===
In 1911 the sword was carried before George V at the official opening of the Thistle Chapel in St Giles' Cathedral, Edinburgh – the first time any of the regalia had left Edinburgh Castle since 1822. During the Second World War, the Honours were hidden at the Castle owing to fears they might be lost if the UK fell to Germany. The crown and Stewart Jewels were buried under the floor of a water closet, while the sceptre, sword and wand were hidden inside a wall. The only officials who knew of the hiding places were George VI, the Scottish Secretary of State, the King's Remembrancer, and the Governor General of Canada. On 24 June 1953 they were presented to the newly crowned Elizabeth II at a national service of thanksgiving in St Giles' Cathedral. Keen to avoid the service being interpreted as a Scottish coronation, Sir Winston Churchill, then Prime Minister, advised the Queen to dress with relative informality.

From 1971 until 1987 the sword was used at the installation of Knights of the Order of the Thistle, Scotland's highest Order of Chivalry. When the Stone of Scone was returned to Scotland in 1996 it was placed in the Crown Room alongside the Honours. During renovations in the 1990s, the Honours were temporarily stored at an anonymous bank in Edinburgh. The Crown of Scotland was present in May 1999 at the first sitting of the devolved Scottish Parliament. It was carried on a cushion, the official reason being that it was too fragile for the Queen to wear.

In 2018 plans were announced to renovate the "past its sell-by date" Honours exhibition and improve accessibility.

The Crown of Scotland was placed on Elizabeth II's coffin at a service in St Giles' Cathedral on 12 September 2022 and remained there whilst she lay in rest. Her successor Charles III was presented with the Honours on 5 July 2023 at a national service of thanksgiving in the same cathedral.

== Honours ==
=== Crown ===
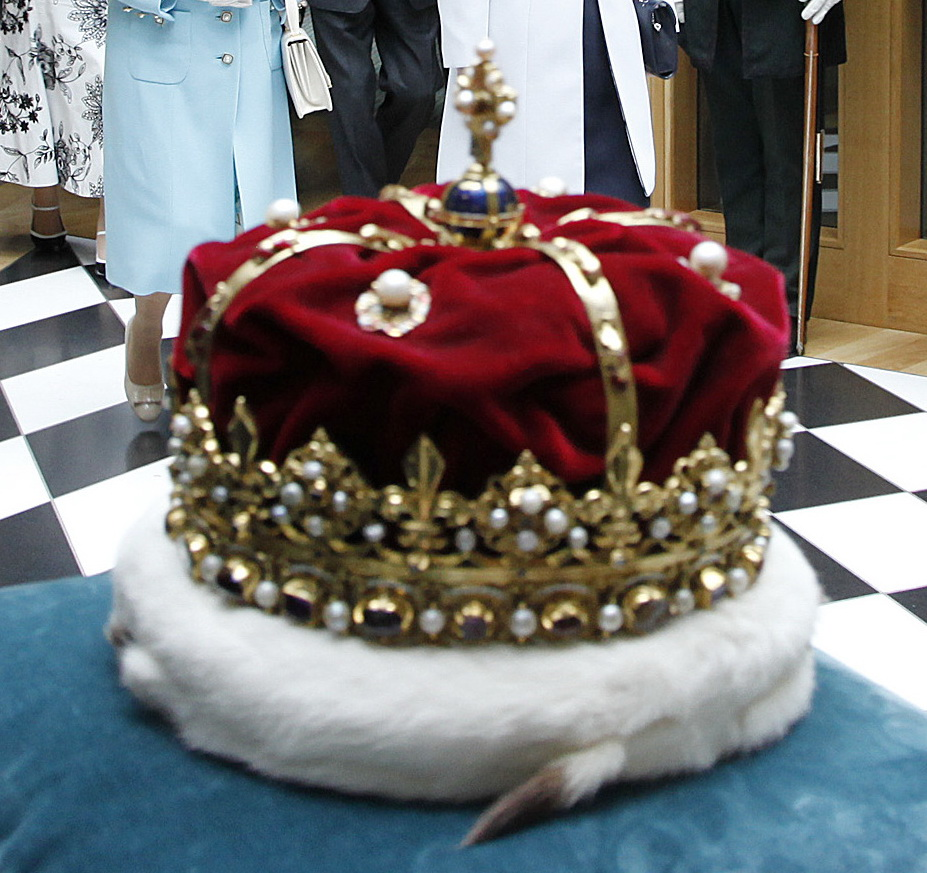
Close-up of the crown in 2011

A crown must have been made during the reign of Robert the Bruce or his son, David II, as David was anointed and crowned, as were all the subsequent Stewart kings, and it was probably this new crown that was remodelled into the current crown. It can be seen in its pre-1540 form in a portrait of James IV in the Book of Hours that was created for his marriage to Margaret Tudor in 1503. Arches were added to the crown by Adam Leys for James V in 1532, making it an imperial crown, symbolising the king's status as an emperor of his own domain, subservient to no one but God. Arches first appeared as pictorial emblems on coins under James III, who in 1469 claimed "ful jurisdictione and free impire within his realm".

External videos
- Cleaning the Scottish Crown Jewels on YouTube (2:00)

In 1540, the circlet was melted down and recast by the Edinburgh goldsmith John Mosman, with the addition of 22 gemstones to the original 20 and an extra 1.2 kilograms (41 oz) of Scottish gold. James V first wore it to his wife's coronation in the same year at Holyrood Abbey. It weighs 1.6 kilograms (3 lb 10 oz), and the circlet is decorated with alternating fleurs-de-lis and crosses fleury. Four gold half-arches, preserved from the original crown, are surmounted by a gold monde – enamelled blue with stars representing the night sky. On top of the monde is a cross decorated with black enamel, pearls and a large amethyst. Originally, a purple velvet bonnet was manufactured by Thomas Arthur of Edinburgh. This was changed to a red bonnet by James VII, and the present bonnet dates from 1993. Four gold ornaments with a large pearl in the centre are attached to the bonnet between the crown's arches.

=== Sceptre ===
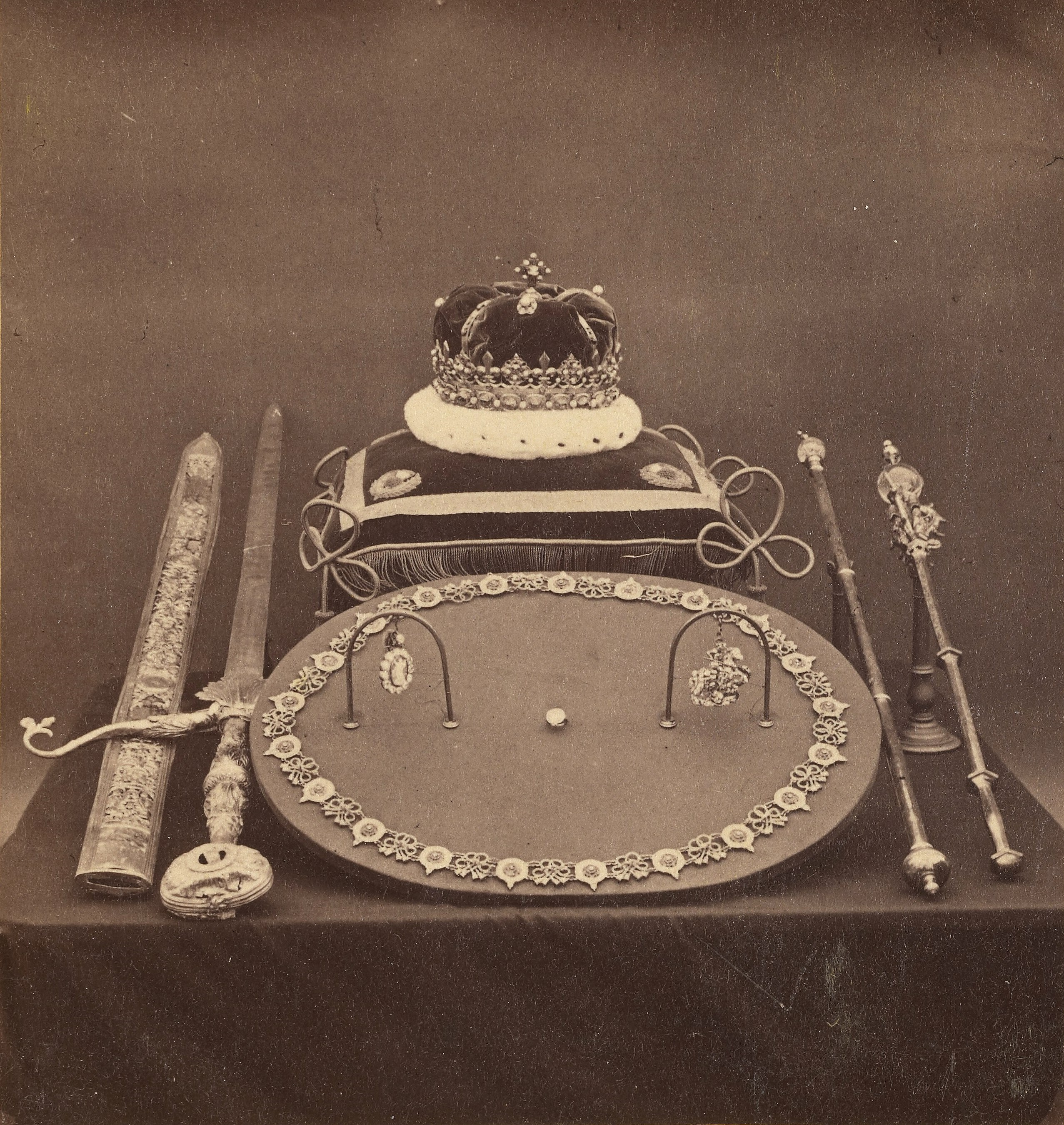

The Sceptre, a symbolic ornamental rod held by the Scottish monarchs at their coronation, was a gift from Pope Alexander VI to James IV in 1494. This papal gift replaced a native-made sceptre which dated from the 14th century at the earliest, and which has been lost. The silver-gilt sceptre was made in Italy, was remodelled and lengthened for James V in 1536 by the Edinburgh goldsmith Adam Leys, and is 86 cm (2.8 ft) long. The Sceptre consists of a handle attached to the bottom of a hexagonal rod, which is topped by a finial. The rod is engraved with grotesques, urns, leaves, thistles and fleurs-de-lis. The finial features stylised dolphins (symbols of the Church), and three figures under canopies: the Virgin Mary wearing a crown and holding the infant Jesus in her right arm and an orb in her left hand; Saint James the Great holding a book and a staff; and Saint Andrew holding a book and a saltire. The finial is topped by a globe of polished rock crystal, surmounted with a golden globe topped by a large pearl.

=== Sword of State ===
The Sword of State was a gift from Pope Julius II presented to James IV along with a blessed hat in 1507 as papal recognition of James's defence of Christendom (see blessed sword and hat). The sword, which measures 137.8 cm (4.5 ft) in length, was made by Domenico da Sutri and replaced a native-made Sword of Honour that had been made in 1502 to complement the Sceptre, and which has been lost. The steel blade, measuring 99 cm (3.2 ft) in length, is etched on either side with the figures of Saint Peter and Saint Paul, and the words: JULIUS II PONT MAX (Julius II Supreme Pontiff) in inlaid gold lettering.

The 38.7-centimetre-long (1.27 ft) silver-gilt handle is decorated with oak leaves and acorns, with two stylised oak leaves which overlap the scabbard, and a crossguard in the form of dolphins. The Sword of State's wooden scabbard is bound in crimson velvet with silver-gilt repoussé work and hung from a 1.5 m (4.9 ft) long sword belt that is made from woven silk and thread-of-gold and has a silver-gilt buckle.

== Other jewels in the Crown Room ==
=== Elizabeth Sword ===
In 2023 the Sword of State was considered too fragile to be presented along with the other Honours of Scotland to King Charles III at the national service of thanksgiving and dedication at St Giles Cathedral on 5 July. A new ceremonial sword, named the Elizabeth Sword after the late monarch, was made by Scottish artisans for the purpose, at a cost of £22,000.

=== Wand ===
Alongside the crown, sceptre and sword, Walter Scott found a silver-gilt wand. It measures 1 metre (3.3 ft) in length and is topped with a faceted crystal monde surmounted by a cross. The wand has a wooden core and the unknown maker's initials F.G. The object's intended role – if it had one at all – has been forgotten, and its presence among the regalia is still a mystery. Walter Scott thought it may have been carried before the Lord High Treasurer of Scotland. Although the Treasurer did have a mace it was a different shape.

=== Stewart Jewels ===
Four objects taken into exile by James VII after the Glorious Revolution in 1688 are also displayed: a locket, a Great George and collar, and a ruby ring. The Stewart Jewels were passed down in the Stuart family. They all returned to Britain 119 years later and were given to Edinburgh Castle on permanent loan by William IV in 1830.

The St Andrew Jewel of the Order of the Thistle is a gold and silver locket suspended from a ribbon that contains an oval piece of chalcedony into which is carved a cameo figure of Saint Andrew. The cameo is bordered with 12 diamonds. Inscribed on the back is the Order's Latin motto: NEMO ME IMPUNE LACESSIT (no one attacks me with impunity). Inside is a miniature portrait of Princess Louise of Stolberg-Gedern, wife of Charles Edward Stuart, the grandson of James VII. The object is variously of English, French, Italian and Dutch origin, was altered several times, and measures 6.5 cm (2.6 in) by 4 cm (1.6 in).

The Collar and the Great George of the Order of the Garter consist of an enamelled gold figure of Saint George, the patron saint of England, slaying a dragon made for Charles II in 1661 suspended from a gold collar made in 1685. The George is set with 122 diamonds and measures 7.2 cm (2.8 in) by 6.4 cm (2.5 in). The saint's cloak and a large suspension loop are both missing. The collar is 1.57 metres (5.2 ft) long and has 26 alternating knots and enamelled badges, each with a tudor rose in the centre.

The Ruby Ring was probably used at the English coronations of Charles I and Charles II, and certainly that of James. It has a large ruby etched with a St George's Cross and bordered by 26 diamonds applied in the 19th century.

=== Lorne Jewels ===
Queen Victoria's fourth daughter, Princess Louise, Duchess of Argyll, died in 1939 and bequeathed a necklace, locket, and pendant to the nation of Scotland. The London-made jewellery was a wedding gift to Louise from her husband the Marquess of Lorne (later the Duke of Argyll) in 1871. The necklace contains 190 diamonds connected by 13 pearls enclosed with diamonds; it suspends the locket, consisting of a large pearl surrounded by 30 diamonds; from which hangs the pear-shaped pendant, set with diamonds, emeralds and sapphires, having a relief depiction of the Galley of Lorne and the motto of Dukes of Argyll: NE OBLIVISCARIS, meaning "do not forget".

== Ampulla of Charles I ==
External videos
- Coronation Ampulla of Charles I on YouTube (2:35)

A gold ampulla was crafted to hold the oil with which Charles I was anointed king at his Scottish coronation in 1633. The pear-shaped vessel is 13 cm (5 in) tall and weighs 110 grams (3.5 ozt). Never used again, it was discovered in the possession of Sir George Grant-Suttie, 7th Baronet, in 1907 by the Scottish Church Society. In 1948 it was acquired by the National Museum of Scotland. The ampulla bears the following Latin inscription to commemorate its use at Charles I's coronation:

Avrea Sacri olei
Receptaculum quo Carolvs eius nominus primus Scotiae
Anglie Fran; et hib; Rex.
Edinburg; in Ecclesia
S: Crucis unctus fuit
lunii xviii
1633.

("The golden vessel of sacred oil, in which Charles, of his name the first, of Scotland, England, France, and Ireland King, was anointed in the Church of the Holy Cross, on the 18th of June, 1633.")

== Commissioners for the Keeping of the Regalia ==
Under the terms of a royal warrant of 1818, the Keeper of the Great Seal of Scotland (the First Minister of Scotland), the Lord Clerk Register, the Lord Advocate, and the Lord Justice Clerk are ex-officio Commissioners for the Keeping of the Regalia. Since 1996, the commissioners have also been empowered by another royal warrant for the safekeeping of the Stone of Scone and for the arrangement of its return to Westminster Abbey for the next British coronation.

== See also ==
- Coat of arms of Kincardineshire
- Great H of Scotland
- Jewels of Mary, Queen of Scots
- Scottish State Coach

== Bibliography ==
- Burnett, Charles J.; Tabraham, Christopher J. (1993). The Honours of Scotland. Historic Scotland. ISBN 978-0-7480-0626-7.
- Goodare, Julian; MacDonald, Alasdair A., eds. (2008). Sixteenth-Century Scotland: Essays in Honour of Michael Lynch. Brill. ISBN 978-90-474-3373-6.
- Groome, Francis H (1885). Ordnance Gazetteer of Scotland: A Survey of Scottish Topography, Statistical, Biographical and Historical. Vol. II. Edinburgh: Thomas C. Jack.
- Keay, Anna; Murphy, Claire (2002). The Crown Jewels: Official Guidebook. Historic Royal Palaces. ISBN 978-1-873-99320-0.
- McCracken-Flesher, Caroline, ed. (2007). Culture, Nation, and the New Scottish Parliament. Bucknell University Press. ISBN 978-0-8387-5547-1.
- Piacenti, Kirsten Aschengreen; Boardman, John (2008). Ancient and Modern Gems and Jewels in the Collection of Her Majesty The Queen (PDF). Royal Collection Trust. ISBN 978-1-902163-47-5. Archived from the original (PDF) on 26 January 2018.
- Stevenson, David (2004). "Keith, William, sixth Earl Marischal (1614–1671)". Oxford Dictionary of National Biography. Oxford University Press. doi:10.1093/ref:odnb/15278. (subscription, Wikipedia Library access or UK public library membership required)
- Twining, Edward Francis (1967). European Regalia. Batsford. ISBN 9787410002039.
- Whatley, Christopher A. (2014). Scots and the Union: Then and Now. Edinburgh University Press. ISBN 978-0-7486-8028-3.
- Crown Jewels Archived 8 November 2016 at the Wayback Machine at the Edinburgh Castle website
- The Honours of Scotland at the Royal Family website
