= Scottish Sword of State =

Ceremonial sword

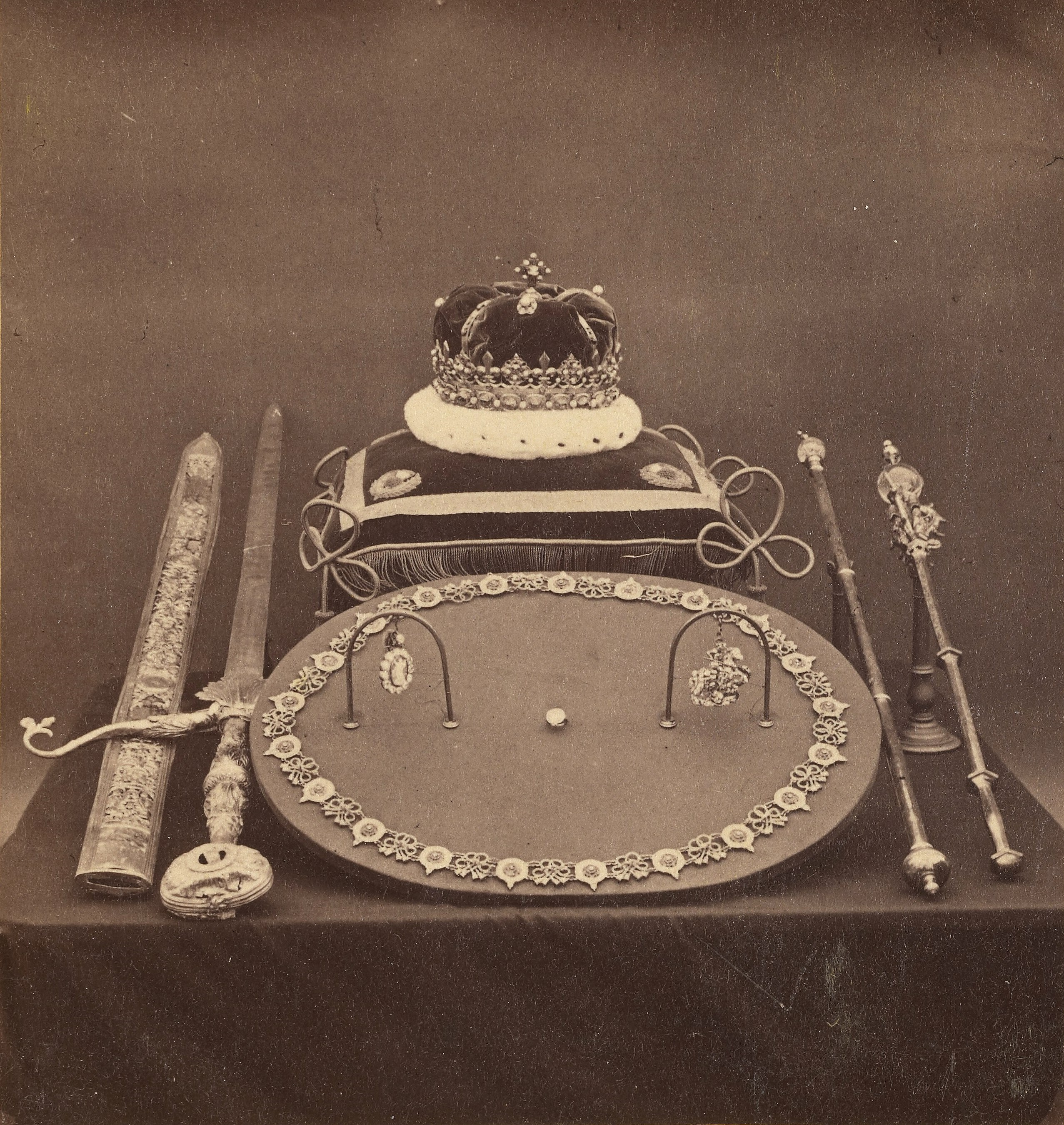
The Sword of State and its scabbard are on the left side in this photograph from the 1860s

The Sword of State, also referred to as the Papal Sword, is a ceremonial sword that served as part of the Honours of Scotland but ceased being formally used in 2022. It was presented to the King of Scotland by Pope Julius II in 1507 and continued to be used as the sword of state for Scotland until 2022 when it was deemed too fragile to continue to be used and was replaced by the Elizabeth Sword.

== History ==
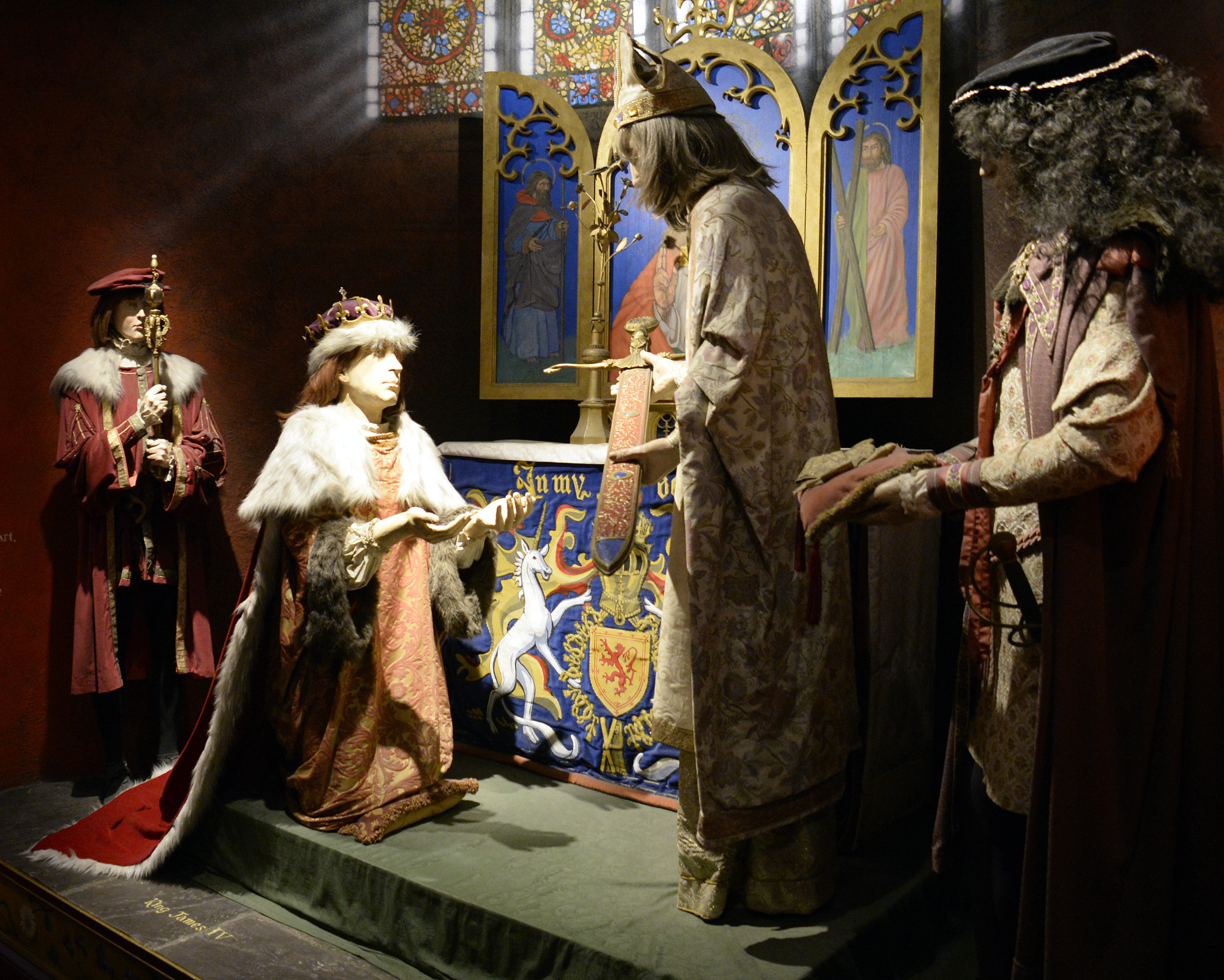
An exhibit depicting King James IV receiving the sword in 1507

=== Origins ===
The Sword of State was gifted to King James IV of Scotland in 1507 by Pope Julius II alongside a consecrated cap as part of the blessed sword and hat traditionally given to Catholic monarchs. James IV adopted the sword to be used as the sword for Scottish coronations and kept them in Edinburgh. He was formally invested with the sword on Easter Sunday 1507 in the Abbey of Holyrood. It subsequently gained the nickname of the "Papal Sword". In August 1536, James V ordered the goldsmith Adam Leys to repair the sword, using silver from melted-down English groats. John Tennent was in charge of the regalia and ordered the making of a case for the sword in March 1539.

=== Anglo-Scottish Civil War ===
During the Anglo-Scottish Civil War in 1650, the Honours were removed from Edinburgh owing to Oliver Cromwell's English forces laying siege to Edinburgh Castle. The sword was moved to Dunnottar Castle, but this was also besieged. Christian Fletcher then smuggled the Honours out in linen baskets, though the sword was broken in two to make it easier to hide. They were then buried in Kinneff until the coronation of Charles II in 1660 allowed for the sword to be returned to Edinburgh, where Fletcher was awarded 2000 merks for their return.

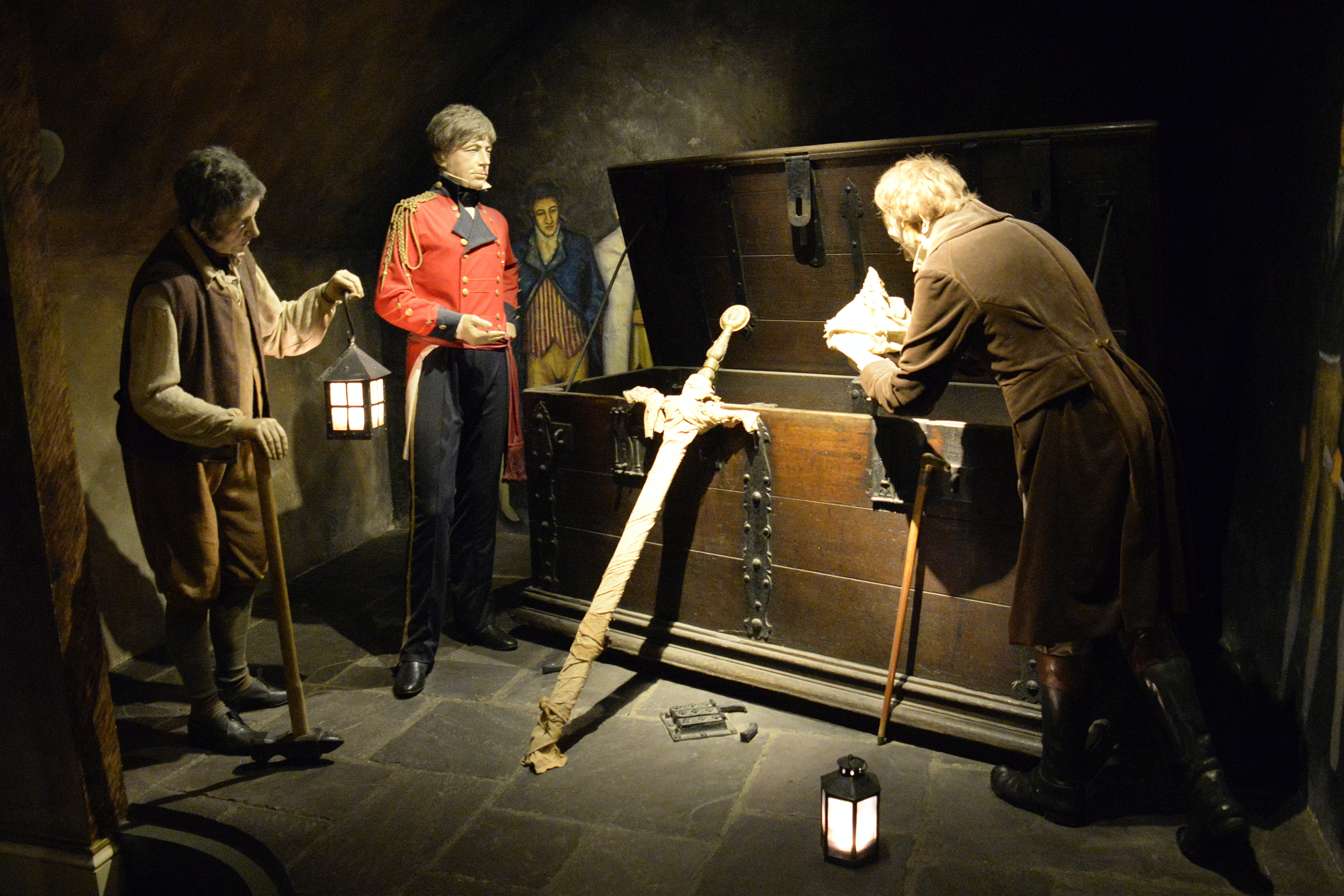
A depiction of the rediscovery of the sword in 1818

Following the Union of 1707, the sword and the rest of the Honours were locked away until 1818, when they were rediscovered by Sir Walter Scott.

=== 500th anniversary ===
In 2007, to celebrate the 500th anniversary of the sword being gifted, the First Minister of Scotland, Alex Salmond, held a reception at Edinburgh Castle and stated "Scotland should never hide its treasures again".

=== Replacement ===
In 2022, it was deemed that the sword was too fragile to continue to be used in official ceremonies so the Scottish Government commissioned the Elizabeth Sword to replace it. The Scottish Sword of State remained on display at Edinburgh Castle.

== Design ==
The sword is made of steel and was designed by the Italian goldsmith Domenico da Sutri. It contains Christian imagery. The handle was made of oak and based on Julius' Papal coat of arms with oak trees and acorns inlaid to symbolise the resurrection of Jesus and the church. The blade contains representations of Saint Peter and Saint Paul with the Latin text: "JULIUS II PONT MAX" (Julius II Supreme Pontiff) inlaid in gold upon it. The scabbard was covered in red velvet and silver-gilt mounts of acorns, oaks, dolphins and the Papal arms.
