= HMS Talbot =

Six ships of the Royal Navy have been named HMS Talbot, probably after John Talbot, 1st Earl of Shrewsbury:

- HMS Talbot (1585) was a ship, listed in 1585.
- HMS Talbot (1691) was a 10-gun ketch launched in 1691 and wrecked in 1694. She had been in French hands between June 1691 and November 1693.
- HMS Talbot (1807) was an 18-gun sloop launched in 1807 and sold into mercantile service in 1815; she then traded between England and India, and made three voyages as a whaler. She was last listed in 1831.
- HMS Talbot (1824) was a 28-gun sixth rate launched in 1824, converted to a powder hulk in 1855 and sold in 1896.
- HMS Talbot (1895) was an Eclipse-class protected cruiser launched in 1895 and sold in 1921.
- HMS Talbot was previously HMS M29, an M29-class monitor launched in 1915. She had been converted into a minelayer in 1919 and renamed HMS Medusa in 1925. She was converted into a depot ship in 1941 and renamed HMS Talbot. She was renamed HMS Medway II in 1943, and Medusa again in 1944. She was sold in 1946 and broken up in 1947.

HMS Talbot was also the name of the Royal Navy's submarine base at Manoel Island, Malta during the Second World War.
