= Langley House =

House in Kings Langley, Hertfordshire, England

Coordinates: 51°42′41″N 0°26′59″W

Langley House is a Grade II* listed house in Kings Langley, Hertfordshire, England. It dates from the late 16th century, with later additions.
