= Cammo =

Northwestern suburb of Edinburgh, Scotland

Designations

Inventory of Gardens and Designed Landscapes in Scotland
- Official name: Cammo
- Designated: 30 March 2001
- Reference no.: GDL00081

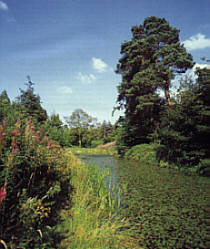
Ornamental canal within the Cammo estate

Cammo (/kæmˈmoʊ/) is a northwestern suburb of Edinburgh, Scotland. It is south of A90, at the edge of the city, approximately 6 miles (10 kilometres) from the city centre.

== Etymology ==
The name is Celtic in origin but could have originated either in Scottish Gaelic or Cumbric. In the former case it would be an adjectival form of Gaelic cambas 'bay. creek'; in the latter it would be from Brittonic *cambāco-, an adjectival form of *camas 'bend in river, bay'. This element would probably refer to a bend of the river in this context, as Cammo is inland.

== Cammo House ==
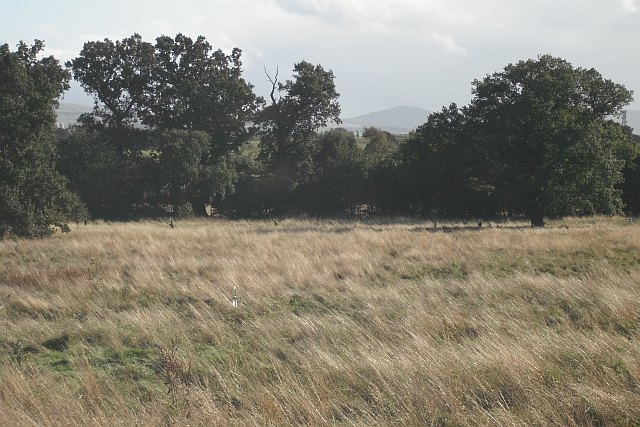

To the west of the housing area there is the former estate of Cammo House. The house was built for John Menzies in 1693, and the surrounding parkland was laid out between 1710-26 by Sir John Clerk of Penicuik (1676–1755). In 1741, the estate passed to the Watsons of Saughton at which time it was called New Saughton. The house was bequeathed to the National Trust for Scotland in 1975 but, in 1977, the house was torched twice by vandals. The house was considered unsafe and was reduced to its external ground floor walls. In 1980 the City of Edinburgh Council was gifted the estate and declared it a Wilderness Park. The Council now maintain the grounds and operates a ranger service. Cammo is thought to have been the inspiration for the "House of Shaws" in Robert Louis Stevenson's novel Kidnapped.

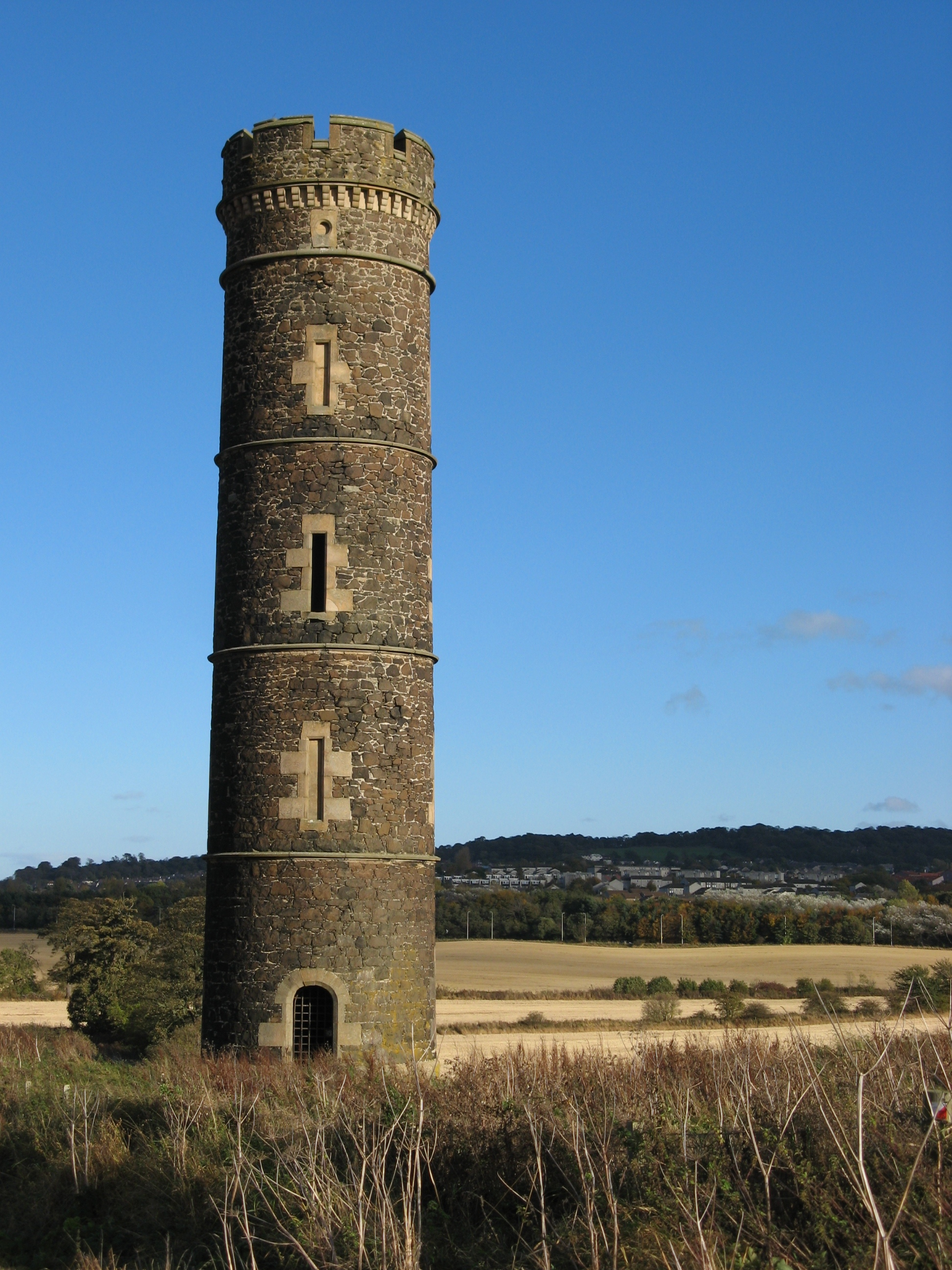
Cammo Tower

Cammo Tower (55°57′14.96″N 3°19′16.94″W) is a 19th-century water tower for Cammo House. Other remains include the ruined stable block, an ornamental canal, a bridge, and the lodge which now houses a small visitor centre. The grounds are now widely used by people for walking in, although other sections remain as farmland, used for cattle grazing.

== Stable Block ==
The stable block was built in 1811 and consists of a two-story building floored with flagstones, a large central arched pavilion, an octagonal clock tower, and a cobblestone courtyard. Behind the stable block there is a steep hill where there are the remains of worker's cottages, which were known as offices or steadings. The possible existence of an older stable block is supported by older maps which predate the current buildings.

== Famous Residents ==
- Alexander Charles Stephen zoologist lived at 17 Cammo Crescent
