= Monarchy of the United Kingdom =

King of the United Kingdom
- Royal coats of arms used in Scotland (right) and elsewhere (left)

Incumbent
- Charles III since 8 September 2022

Details
- Style: His Majesty
- Heir apparent: William, Prince of Wales
- Residences: Buckingham Palace; Clarence House; Windsor Castle; Holyrood Palace; Various others
- Website: royal.uk

The monarchy of the United Kingdom, or simply the British monarchy, is the form of government used by the United Kingdom by which a hereditary monarch reigns as the head of state, with their powers regulated by the British constitution. The term may also refer to the role of the royal family within the United Kingdom's broader political structure. The monarch since 8 September 2022 is King Charles III, who ascended the throne on the death of his mother, Queen Elizabeth II.

The monarch and the immediate royal family undertake various official, ceremonial, diplomatic, and representational duties. Although formally the monarch has authority over the government—which is known as "His/Her Majesty's Government"—this power may only be used according to laws enacted in Parliament and within constraints of convention and precedent. In practice the monarch's role, including that of Head of the Armed Forces, is limited to functions such as bestowing honours and appointing the prime minister, which are performed in a non-partisan manner. In 2014, the House of Lords Select Committee on Soft Power and the UK's Influence called the monarchy "a unique soft power and diplomatic asset". The Crown also occupies a unique cultural role, serving as an unofficial brand ambassador for British interests and values abroad, increasing tourism at home, and promoting charities throughout civil society.

The British monarchy traces its origins from the petty kingdoms of Anglo-Saxon England and early medieval Scotland, which had consolidated into the separate kingdoms of England and Scotland by the 10th century. England was conquered by the Normans in 1066, after which Wales also gradually came under the control of Anglo-Normans. The process was completed in the 13th century when the Principality of Wales became a client state of the English kingdom. The Anglo-Normans also established the Lordship of Ireland. Meanwhile, the Magna Carta began the process of reducing the English monarch's political powers. In the 16th century, English and Scottish monarchs played a central role in what became the religious English Reformation and Scottish Reformation, and the English king became King of Ireland. Beginning in 1603, the English and Scottish kingdoms were ruled by a single sovereign when the Scottish King James VI acceded to the throne of England as James I. From 1649 to 1660, the tradition of monarchy was broken by the republican Commonwealth of England, which followed the Wars of the Three Kingdoms. Following the installation of William III and Mary II as co-monarchs in the Glorious Revolution, the Bill of Rights 1689, and its Scottish counterpart the Claim of Right Act 1689, further curtailed the power of the monarchy and excluded Roman Catholics from succession to the throne. In 1707, the kingdoms of England and Scotland were merged to create the Kingdom of Great Britain, and in 1801, the Kingdom of Ireland joined to create the United Kingdom of Great Britain and Ireland.

Beginning in the 16th century, the monarch of England was the nominal head of the English overseas possessions, which later became the vast British Empire, covering a quarter of the world's land area at its greatest extent in 1921. The title Emperor of India was added to the British monarch's titles in 1876 and abandoned in 1948. The Balfour Declaration of 1926 recognised the evolution of the Dominions of the Empire into separate, self-governing countries within a Commonwealth of Nations. Also in this period, the monarchy in Ireland eventually became limited to Northern Ireland. In the years after the Second World War, the vast majority of British colonies and territories became independent, effectively bringing the Empire to an end. George VI and his successors adopted the title Head of the Commonwealth as a symbol of the free association of its independent member states. The United Kingdom and fourteen other independent sovereign states that share the same person as their monarch are called the Commonwealth realms. Although the monarch is shared, each country is sovereign and independent of the others, and the monarch has a different, specific, and official national title and style for each realm. Although the term is rarely used today, the fifteen Commonwealth realms are, with respect to their monarch, in personal union. The monarch is also head of state of the Crown Dependencies and the British Overseas Territories.

== Constitutional role ==
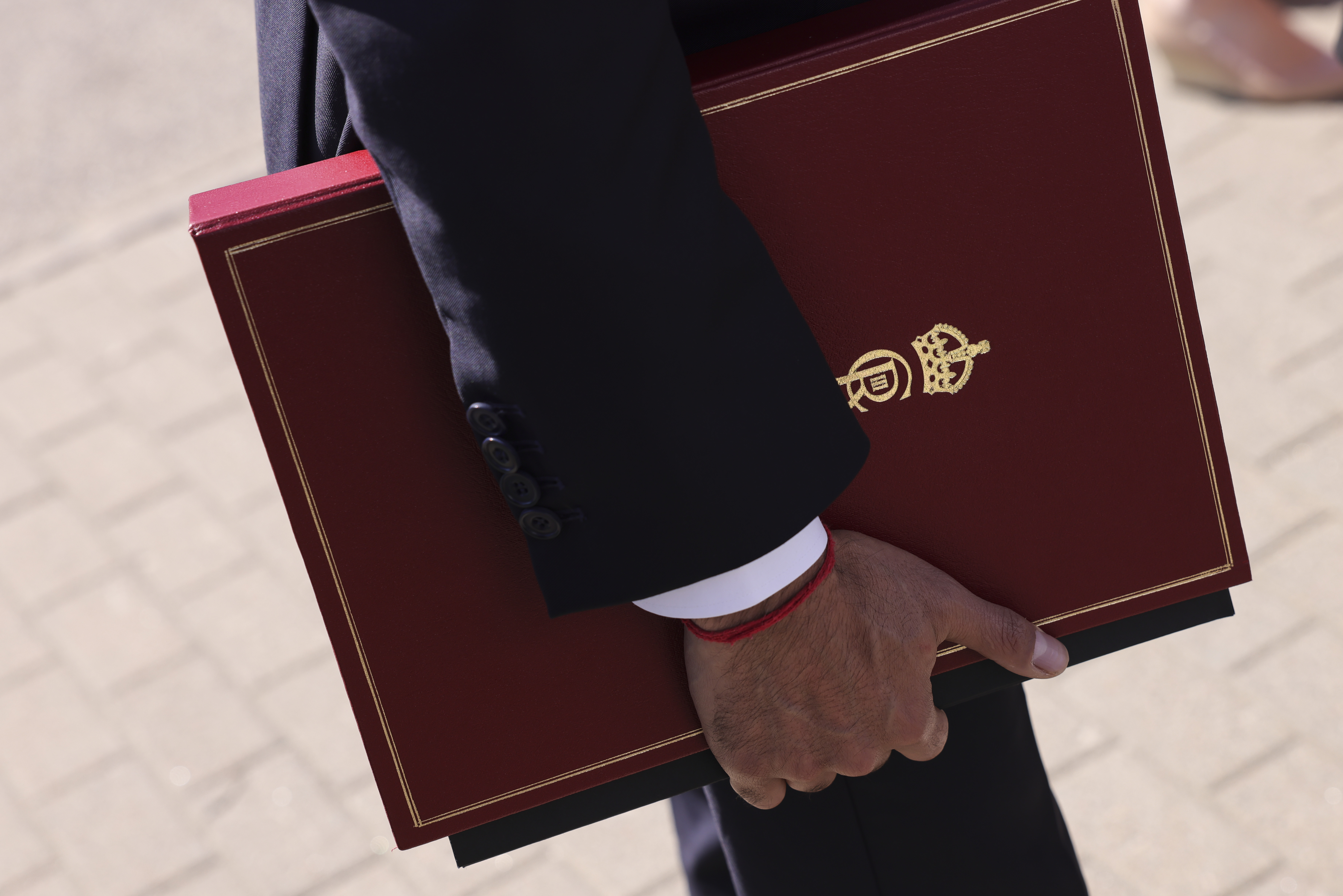
The monarch's cypher on a ministerial folder

In the uncodified Constitution of the United Kingdom, the monarch (exclusively referred to in legislation as "the Sovereign", and styled His or Her Majesty) is the head of state. The monarch's image is used to signify British sovereignty and government authority – the monarch's profile, for instance, appears on Bank of England notes and all British coins and a portrait hangs in government buildings. The sovereign is further both mentioned in and the subject of songs, loyal toasts, and salutes. "God Save the King" (or, alternatively, "God Save the Queen") is the British national anthem. Oaths of allegiance are made to the sovereign and his or her lawful successors.

The monarch takes little direct part in government. The authority to use the royal prerogative, the sovereign's formal powers, is almost all delegated, either by statute or by convention, to ministers or officers of the Crown, or other public bodies. Thus the acts of state done in the name of the Crown, such as Crown Appointments, even if personally performed by the monarch, such as the King's Speech and the State Opening of Parliament, depend upon decisions made elsewhere. In formal terms:

- Legislative power is exercised by the King, the House of Lords and the House of Commons acting together as the King-in-Parliament.
- Executive power is exercised by His Majesty's Government, which comprises ministers, primarily the prime minister and the Cabinet, which is technically a committee of the Privy Council. They have the direction of the Armed Forces of the Crown, the Civil Service and other Crown Servants such as the Diplomatic and Secret Services.
- Judicial power is vested in the various judiciaries of the United Kingdom, which by constitution and statute are independent of the Government.
- The Church of England, of which the sovereign is the titular head, has its own legislative, judicial, and executive structures.
- Powers independent of government are legally granted to other public bodies by statute or Statutory Instrument such as an Order in Council, Royal commission or otherwise.

The sovereign's role as a constitutional monarch is largely limited to non-partisan functions, such as granting honours. This role has been recognised since the 19th century. The constitutional writer Walter Bagehot identified the monarchy in 1867 as the "dignified" rather than the "efficient" part of government.

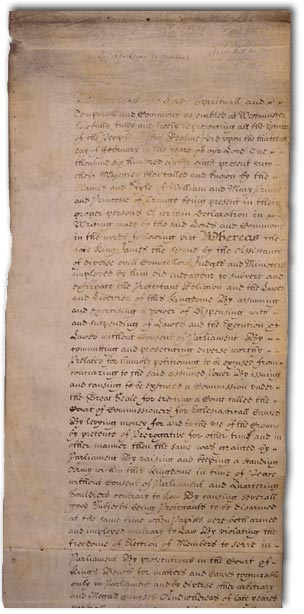
The English Bill of Rights of 1689 curtailed the sovereign's governmental power.

=== Royal prerogative ===
That part of the government's executive authority which remains theoretically and nominally vested in the sovereign is known as the royal prerogative. The monarch acts within the constraints of convention and precedent, exercising prerogative powers only on the advice of ministers responsible to Parliament, often through the prime minister or Privy Council. In practice, prerogative powers are exercised only on the prime minister's advice – the prime minister, and not the sovereign, has control. The monarch holds a weekly audience with the prime minister; no records of these audiences are taken and the proceedings remain fully confidential. The monarch may express his or her views, but, as a constitutional ruler, must ultimately accept the decisions of the prime minister and Cabinet, who by definition enjoy the confidence of the House of Commons. In Bagehot's words: "the sovereign has, under a constitutional monarchy ... three rights – the right to be consulted, the right to encourage, the right to warn."

Although the royal prerogative is extensive and parliamentary approval is not formally required for its exercise, it is limited. Many Crown prerogatives have fallen out of use or have been permanently transferred to Parliament. For example, the sovereign cannot impose and collect new taxes; such an action requires the authorisation of an Act of Parliament. According to a parliamentary report, "The Crown cannot invent new prerogative powers", and Parliament can override any prerogative power by passing legislation.

The royal prerogative includes the powers to appoint and dismiss ministers, regulate the civil service, issue passports, declare war, make peace, direct the actions of the military, and negotiate and ratify treaties, alliances, and international agreements. However, a treaty cannot alter the domestic laws of the United Kingdom; an Act of Parliament is necessary in such cases. The sovereign is the Head of the Armed Forces (the Royal Navy, the British Army, and the Royal Air Force), and accredits British High commissioners and ambassadors, and receives heads of missions from foreign states.

==== Appointment of the prime minister ====
The sovereign has the power to appoint the prime minister. In accordance with unwritten constitutional conventions, the monarch appoints the individual who commands the support of the House of Commons, usually the leader of a party or coalition that has a majority in that House. The prime minister takes office by attending the monarch in a private audience, and after "kissing hands" that appointment is immediately effective without any other formality or instrument. The sovereign also has the power to dismiss the prime minister, but the last time this power was exercised was in 1834, when William IV dismissed Lord Melbourne; since then, prime ministers have only left office upon their resignation, which they are expected to offer to the monarch upon losing their majority in the House of Commons.

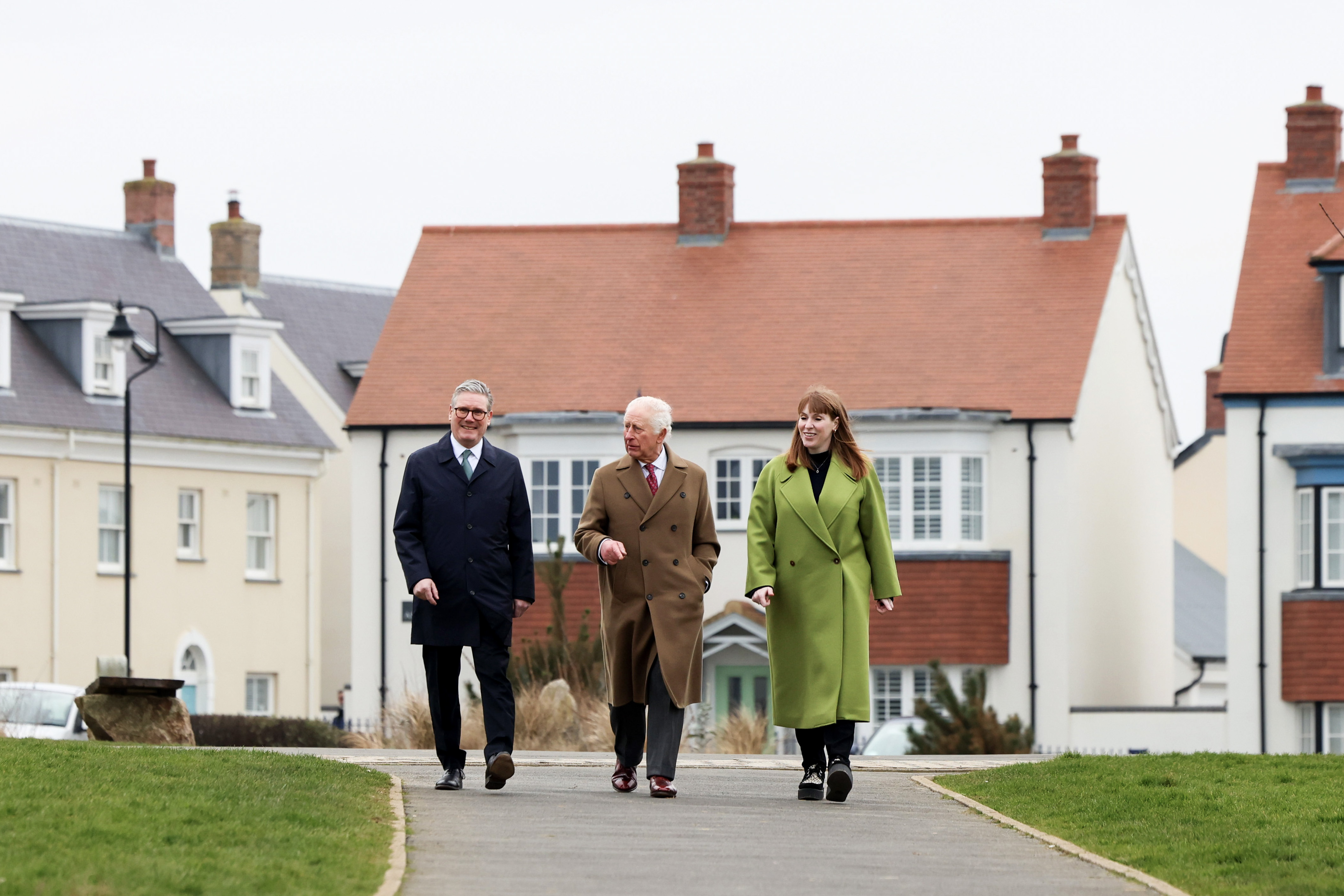
King Charles III with Prime Minister Keir Starmer and Deputy Prime Minister Angela Rayner, 2025

While the sovereign also appoints and may dismiss every other Minister of the Crown, by convention they do so only on the recommendation of the prime minister. It is therefore the prime minister who controls the composition of the government.

In a hung parliament where no party or coalition holds a majority, the monarch has an increased degree of latitude in choosing the individual likely to command the most support, though it would usually be the leader of the largest party. Since 1945, there have only been three hung parliaments. The first followed the February 1974 general election when Harold Wilson was appointed prime minister after Edward Heath resigned following his failure to form a coalition. Although Wilson's Labour Party did not have a majority, they were the largest party. The second followed the May 2010 general election, in which the Conservatives (the largest party) and Liberal Democrats (the third-largest party) agreed to form the first coalition government since World War II. The third occurred shortly thereafter, in June 2017, when the Conservative Party lost its majority in a snap election, though the party remained in power as a minority government.

==== Summons, prorogation and dissolution of Parliament ====
The sovereign has the power to summon, prorogue and dissolve Parliament. Each parliamentary session begins with the sovereign's summons. The new parliamentary session is marked by the State Opening of Parliament, during which the monarch reads the speech from the throne in the chamber of the House of Lords, outlining the Government's legislative agenda. Prorogation usually occurs about one year after a session begins, and formally concludes the session. Dissolution ends a parliamentary term, and is followed by a general election for all seats in the House of Commons. If not dissolved sooner, Parliaments are automatically dissolved after five years.

The Fixed-term Parliaments Act 2011 temporarily removed the sovereign's authority to dissolve Parliament; however, this power was restored by the Dissolution and Calling of Parliament Act 2022. The sovereign's power of prorogation was unaffected, which is a regular feature of the parliamentary calendar.

In 1950 the Monarch's Private Secretary Alan "Tommy" Lascelles, writing pseudonymously to The Times newspaper, asserted a constitutional convention: according to the Lascelles Principles, if a minority government asked to dissolve Parliament to call an early election to strengthen its position, the monarch could refuse and would do so under three conditions. When Harold Wilson requested a dissolution late in 1974, Queen Elizabeth II granted his request as Heath had already failed to form a coalition. The resulting general election gave Wilson a small majority. The monarch could in theory unilaterally dismiss the prime minister, but in practice, the prime minister's term nowadays comes to an end only by electoral defeat, death, or resignation.

==== Other royal prerogatives ====
Before a bill passed by the legislative Houses can become law, royal assent (the monarch's approval) is required. In theory, assent can either be granted (making the bill law) or withheld (vetoing the bill), but since 1708 assent has always been granted.

The sovereign has a similar relationship to the devolved governments of Scotland, Wales, and Northern Ireland as to the government of the UK. The sovereign appoints the First Minister of Scotland on the nomination of the Scottish Parliament, and the First Minister of Wales on the nomination of the Senedd. In Scottish matters, the sovereign acts on the advice of the Scottish Government. However, as devolution is more limited in Wales, in Welsh matters the monarch acts on the advice of the prime minister and Cabinet of the United Kingdom. The sovereign can veto any law passed by the Northern Ireland Assembly, if it is deemed unconstitutional by the Secretary of State for Northern Ireland.

The sovereign is deemed the "fount of justice"; although the monarch does not personally rule in judicial cases, judicial functions are performed in his or her name. For instance, prosecutions are brought on the sovereign's behalf, and courts derive their authority from the Crown. The common law holds that the sovereign "can do no wrong", and so cannot be prosecuted for criminal offences. The Crown Proceedings Act 1947 allows civil lawsuits against the Crown in its public capacity (that is, lawsuits against the government), but not lawsuits against the monarch personally. The sovereign exercises the "prerogative of mercy", which is used to pardon convicted offenders or reduce sentences.

The sovereign is the "fount of honour", the source of all honours and dignities in the United Kingdom. The Crown creates all peerages, appoints members of the orders of chivalry, grants knighthoods and awards other honours. Although peerages and most other honours are granted on the advice of the prime minister, some honours are within the personal gift of the sovereign and are not granted on ministerial advice. The sovereign alone appoints members of the Order of the Garter, the Order of the Thistle, the Royal Victorian Order and the Order of Merit.

=== Sovereign immunity ===
The sovereign is personally immune from criminal prosecution or arrest, as well as from civil actions, and their property is not subject to execution or foreclosure. The Crown, however, as distinct from the sovereign, can be the subject of proceedings for tort and contract since 1947.

There are more than 160 laws granting express immunity to the sovereign or their property in various respects. For example, the sovereign is exempt from anti-discrimination legislation and other workers' rights, health and safety, or pensions laws, as well as numerous taxes, and environmental inspectors cannot enter the sovereign's property without permission.

== History ==
=== English monarchy ===
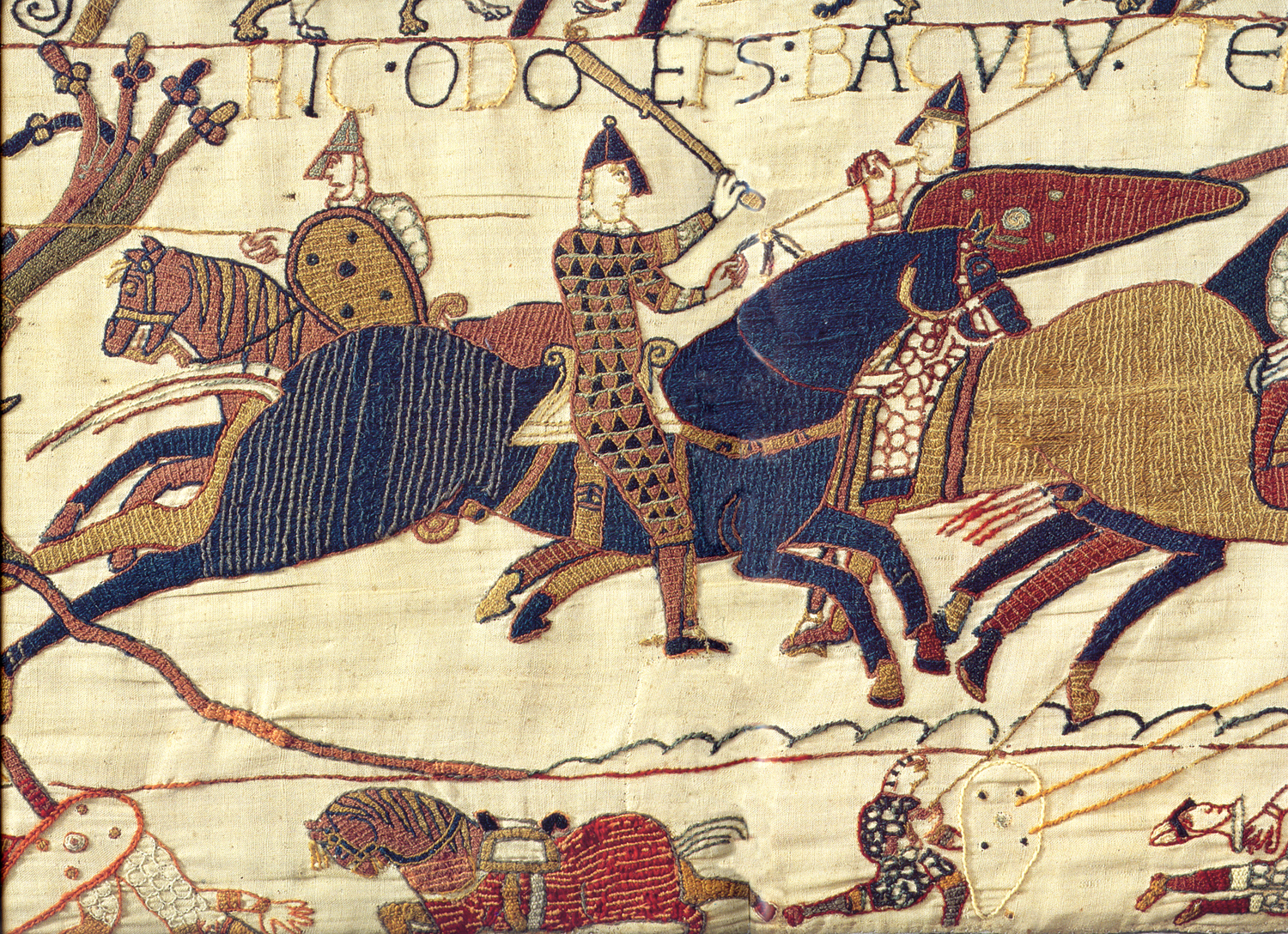
The Bayeux Tapestry depicts the Norman Conquest of 1066.

Following Viking raids and settlement in the ninth century, the Anglo-Saxon kingdom of Wessex emerged as the dominant English kingdom. Alfred the Great secured Wessex, achieved dominance over western Mercia, and assumed the title "King of the Anglo-Saxons". His grandson Æthelstan was the first king to rule over a unitary kingdom roughly corresponding to the present borders of England, though its constituent parts retained strong regional identities. The 11th century saw England become more stable, despite a number of wars with the Danes, which resulted in a Danish monarchy for one generation. The conquest of England in 1066 by William, Duke of Normandy, was crucial in terms of both political and social change. The new monarch continued the centralisation of power begun in the Anglo-Saxon period, while the feudal system continued to develop.

William was succeeded by two of his sons: William II, then Henry I. Henry made a controversial decision to name his daughter Matilda (his only surviving child) as his heir. Following Henry's death in 1135, his nephew, Stephen, claimed the throne and took power with the support of most of the barons. Matilda challenged his reign; as a result, England descended into a period of disorder known as the Anarchy. Stephen maintained a precarious hold on power, but agreed to a compromise under which Matilda's son Henry II would succeed him. Henry accordingly became the first Angevin king of England and the first monarch of the Plantagenet dynasty in 1154.

The reigns of most of the Angevin monarchs were marred by civil strife and conflicts between the monarch and the nobility. Henry II faced rebellions from his own sons, including the future monarchs Richard I and John, but nevertheless managed to expand his kingdom, forming what is retrospectively known as the Angevin Empire. Upon Henry's death, his eldest surviving legitimate son Richard succeeded to the throne; Richard was absent from England for most of his reign, for he left to fight in the Crusades. He was killed whilst besieging a castle; John succeeded him. Arthur I, Duke of Brittany, son of John's deceased elder brother Duke Geoffrey II and himself former heir of Richard, was dissatisfied but disappeared the following year after being captured by John in 1202; Arthur's sister, Eleanor, Fair Maid of Brittany was placed under house arrest by John.

John's reign was marked by conflict with the barons, particularly over the limits of royal power. In 1215, the barons coerced the king into issuing Magna Carta (Latin for "Great Charter") to guarantee the rights and liberties of the nobility. Soon afterwards, further disagreements plunged England into a civil war known as the First Barons' War, and French Prince Louis also claimed the throne as Louis I with the support of the rebellious princes as John's nephew-in-law. The war abruptly ended when John died in 1216, leaving the Crown to his nine-year-old son Henry III. Many rebellious lords also turned to support Henry III. In 1217, Louis was defeated and renounced the English throne. Eleanor's claim was not upheld, but according to John's will, she remained under house arrest until her death in 1241. The London Chronicle referred to her as the rightful heir to the throne, while the Lanercost Chronicle recorded a legend of Henry III giving her a golden crown before her death. With Geoffrey leaving no descendants, Henry III became the hereditary heir of the royal family.

Later in Henry's reign, Simon de Montfort led the barons in another rebellion, beginning the Second Barons' War. The war ended in a clear royalist victory and in the death of many rebels, but not before the king had agreed to summon a parliament in 1265. In 1268, Henry III ordered the Amesbury Priory to commemorate both Arthur and Eleanor in commemoration of past kings and queens as well.

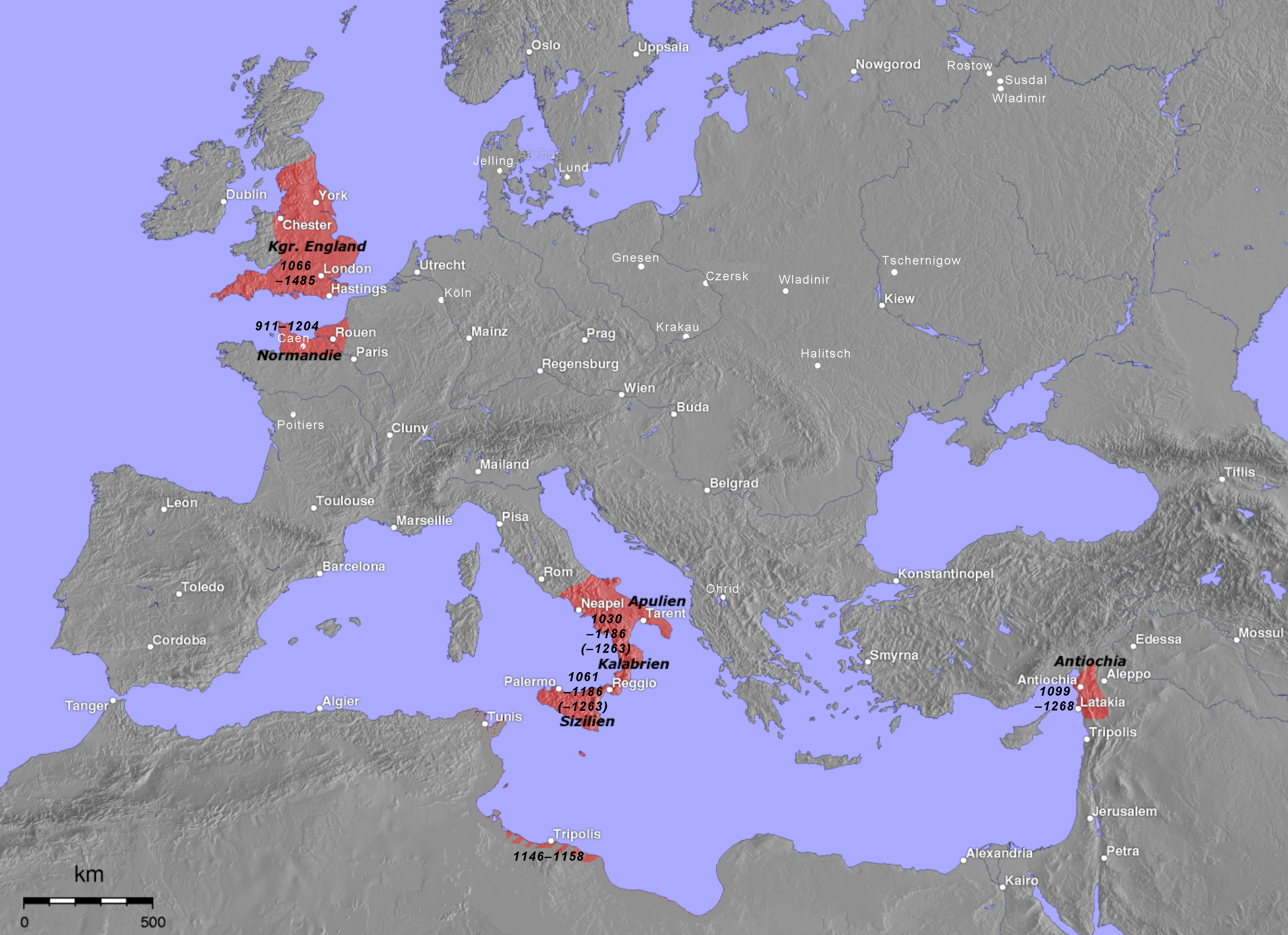
Norman possessions in the 12th century, including England (1066–1485, not always in personal union with Normandy), Normandy (911–1204), southern Italy and Sicily (1030–1263), parts of Africa around Tripoli (1146–1158), and the Crusader state of the Principality of Antioch. Not shown: Principality of Tarragona (1129–1173).

The next monarch, Edward Longshanks, was far more successful in maintaining royal power and was responsible for the conquest of Wales. He attempted to establish English domination of Scotland. However, gains in Scotland were reversed during the reign of his successor, Edward II, who also faced conflict with the nobility. In 1311, Edward II was forced to relinquish many of his powers to a committee of baronial "ordainers"; however, military victories helped him regain control in 1322. Edward was deposed by his wife Isabella and his son, Edward III, became king.

Edward III claimed the French Crown, setting off the Hundred Years' War between England and France. His campaigns conquered much French territory, but by 1374, all the gains had been lost. Edward's reign was also marked by the further development of Parliament, which came to be divided into two Houses; he died in 1377, leaving the Crown to his 10-year-old grandson Richard II. Like many of his predecessors, Richard II conflicted with the nobles by attempting to concentrate power in his own hands. In 1399, while he was campaigning in Ireland, his cousin Henry Bolingbroke seized power. Richard was deposed, imprisoned, and eventually murdered, probably by starvation, and Henry became king as Henry IV.

Henry IV was the grandson of Edward III and the son of John of Gaunt, Duke of Lancaster; hence, his dynasty was known as the House of Lancaster. For most of his reign, Henry IV was forced to fight off plots and rebellions; his success was partly due to the military skill of his son, the future Henry V. Henry V's own reign, which began in 1413, was largely free from domestic strife, leaving the king free to pursue the Hundred Years' War in France. Although he was victorious, his sudden death in 1422 left his infant son Henry VI on the throne and gave the French an opportunity to overthrow English rule.

The unpopularity of Henry VI's counsellors and his consort, Margaret of Anjou, as well as his own ineffectual leadership, led to the weakening of the House of Lancaster. The Lancastrians faced a challenge from the House of York, so-called because its head, a descendant of Edward III, was Richard, Duke of York, who was at odds with the Queen. Although the Duke of York died in battle in 1460, his eldest son, Edward IV, led the Yorkists to victory in 1461, overthrowing Henry VI and Margaret of Anjou. Edward IV was constantly at odds with the Lancastrians and his own councillors after his marriage to Elizabeth Woodville, with a brief return to power for Henry VI. Edward IV prevailed, winning back the throne at Barnet and killing the Lancastrian heir, Edward of Westminster, at Tewkesbury. Afterwards he captured Margaret of Anjou, eventually sending her into exile, but not before killing Henry VI while he was held prisoner in the Tower. The Wars of the Roses, nevertheless, continued intermittently during his reign and those of his son Edward V and brother Richard III. Edward V disappeared, presumably murdered by Richard. Ultimately, the conflict culminated in success for the Lancastrian branch led by Henry Tudor, in 1485, when Richard III was killed in the Battle of Bosworth Field.

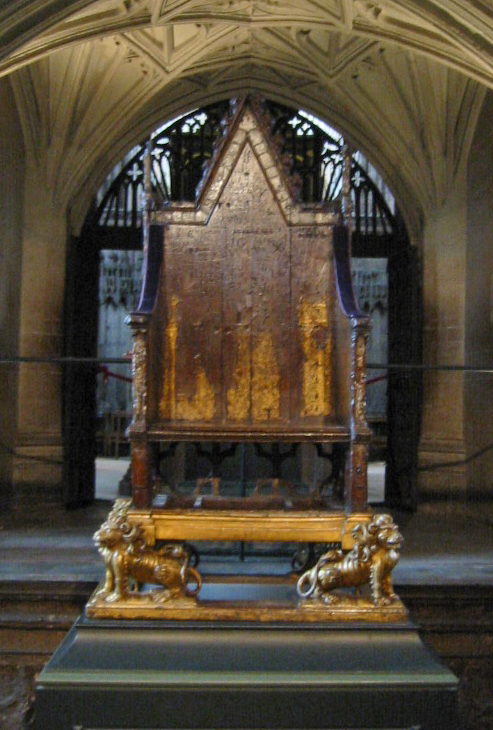
King Edward's Chair in Westminster Abbey. A 13th-century wooden oak throne on which the British monarch sits when he or she is crowned at the coronation, swearing to uphold the law and the church.

King Henry VII then neutralised the remaining Yorkist forces, partly by marrying Elizabeth of York, daughter of King Edward IV and a Yorkist heir. Through skill and ability, Henry re-established absolute supremacy in the realm, and the conflicts with the nobility that had plagued previous monarchs came to an end. The reign of the second Tudor king, Henry VIII, was one of great political change. Religious upheaval and disputes with the Pope, and the fact that his marriage to Catherine of Aragon produced only one surviving child, a daughter, led the monarch to break from the Roman Catholic Church and establish the Church of England (the Anglican Church) and divorce his wife to marry Anne Boleyn.

Wales – which had been conquered centuries earlier, but had remained a separate dominion – was annexed to England under the Laws in Wales Acts 1535 and 1542. Henry VIII's son and successor, the young Edward VI, continued with further religious reforms, but his early death in 1553 precipitated a succession crisis. He was wary of allowing his Catholic elder half-sister Mary I to succeed, and therefore drew up a will designating Lady Jane Grey as his heiress. Jane's reign, however, lasted only nine days; with tremendous popular support, Mary deposed her and declared herself the lawful sovereign. Mary I married Philip of Spain, who was declared king and co-ruler. He pursued disastrous wars in France and she attempted to return England to Roman Catholicism (burning Protestants at the stake as heretics in the process). Upon her death in 1558, the pair were succeeded by her Protestant half-sister Elizabeth I. England returned to Protestantism and continued its growth into a major world power by building its navy and exploring the New World.

=== Scottish monarchy ===
In Scotland, as in England, monarchies emerged after the withdrawal of the Roman Empire from Great Britain in the early fifth century. The three groups that lived in Scotland at this time were the Picts north of the Forth and Clyde, the Britons in the south, including the Kingdom of Strathclyde, and the Gaels or Scotti (who would later give their name to Scotland), of the Irish petty kingdom of Dál Riata in Argyll and the southern Hebrides. Kenneth MacAlpin is traditionally viewed as the first king of a united Scotland (known as Scotia to writers in Latin, or Alba to the Scots). The expansion of Scottish dominions continued over the next two centuries, as other territories such as Strathclyde were absorbed.

Early Scottish monarchs did not inherit the Crown directly; instead, the custom of tanistry was followed, where the monarchy alternated between different branches of the House of Alpin. There was an elective element to early Scottish kings and this practice lingered for much longer in Scotland. For example, the first Stewart monarch, Robert II, was selected from among eligible royal males at Linlithgow in 1370 by the Three Estates of the Scottish Parliament. However, as a result of this elective element, the rival dynastic lines clashed, often violently. From 942 to 1005, seven consecutive monarchs were either murdered or killed in battle. In 1005, Malcolm II ascended the throne having killed many rivals. He continued to ruthlessly eliminate opposition, and when he died in 1034 he was succeeded by his grandson, Duncan I, instead of a cousin, as had been usual. In 1040, Duncan suffered defeat in battle at the hands of Macbeth, who was killed himself in 1057 by Duncan's son Malcolm. The following year, after killing Macbeth's stepson Lulach, Malcolm ascended the throne as Malcolm III.

With a further series of battles and deposings, five of Malcolm's sons as well as one of his brothers successively became king. Eventually, the Crown came to his youngest son, David I. David was succeeded by his grandsons Malcolm IV, and then by William the Lion, the longest-reigning King of Scots before the Union of the Crowns. William participated in a rebellion against King Henry II of England but when the rebellion failed, William was captured by the English. In exchange for his release, William was forced to acknowledge Henry as his feudal overlord. The English King Richard I agreed to terminate the arrangement in 1189, in return for a large sum of money needed for the Crusades. William died in 1214 and was succeeded by his son Alexander II. Alexander II, as well as his successor Alexander III, attempted to take over the Western Isles, which were still under the overlordship of Norway. During the reign of Alexander III, Norway launched an unsuccessful invasion of Scotland; the ensuing Treaty of Perth recognised Scottish control of the Western Isles and other disputed areas.

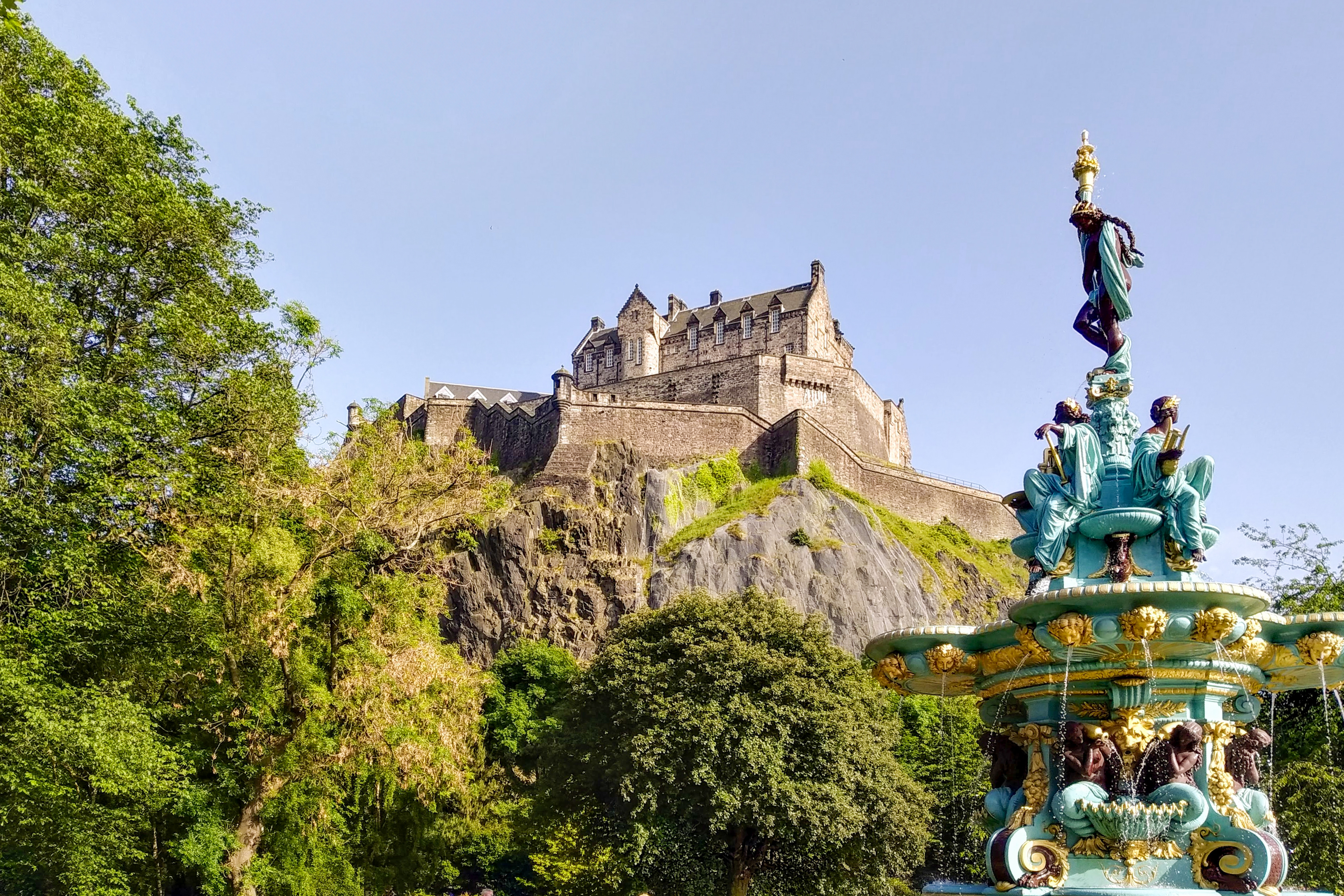
Edinburgh Castle, the historical royal seat of Scotland

Alexander III's death in a riding accident in 1286 precipitated a major succession crisis. Scottish leaders appealed to King Edward I of England for help in determining who was the rightful heir. Edward chose Alexander's three-year-old Norwegian granddaughter, Margaret. On her way to Scotland in 1290, however, Margaret died at sea, and Edward was again asked to adjudicate between 13 rival claimants to the throne. A court was set up and after two years of deliberation, it pronounced John Balliol to be king. Edward proceeded to treat Balliol as a vassal and tried to exert influence over Scotland. In 1295, when Balliol renounced his allegiance to England, Edward I invaded. During the first ten years of the ensuing Wars of Scottish Independence, Scotland had no monarch, until Robert the Bruce declared himself king in 1306.

Robert's efforts to control Scotland culminated in success and Scottish independence was acknowledged in 1328. However, only one year later, Robert died and was succeeded by his five-year-old son, David II. On the pretext of restoring John Balliol's rightful heir, Edward Balliol, the English again invaded in 1332. During the next four years, Balliol was crowned, deposed, restored, deposed, restored, and deposed until he eventually settled in England, and David remained king for the next 35 years.

David II died childless in 1371 and was succeeded by his nephew Robert II of the House of Stuart. The reigns of both Robert II and his successor, Robert III, were marked by a general decline in royal power. When Robert III died in 1406, regents had to rule the country; the monarch, Robert III's son James I, had been taken captive by the English. Having paid a large ransom, James returned to Scotland in 1424; to restore his authority, he used ruthless measures, including the execution of several of his enemies. He was assassinated by a group of nobles. James II continued his father's policies by subduing influential noblemen but he was killed in an accident at the age of thirty, and a council of regents again assumed power. James III was defeated in a battle against rebellious Scottish earls in 1488, leading to another boy-king: James IV.

In 1513 James IV launched an invasion of England, attempting to take advantage of the absence of the English King Henry VIII. His forces met with disaster at Flodden Field; the king, many senior noblemen, and hundreds of soldiers were killed. As his son and successor, James V, was an infant, the government was again taken over by regents. James V led another disastrous war with the English in 1542, and his death in the same year left the Crown in the hands of his six-day-old daughter, Mary. Once again, a regency was established.

Mary, a Roman Catholic, reigned during a period of great religious upheaval in Scotland. As a result of the efforts of reformers such as John Knox, a Protestant ascendancy was established. Mary caused alarm by marrying her Catholic cousin, Henry Stuart, Lord Darnley, in 1565. After Lord Darnley's assassination in 1567, Mary contracted an even more unpopular marriage with the Earl of Bothwell, who was widely suspected of Darnley's murder. The nobility rebelled against the queen, forcing her to abdicate. She fled to England, and the Crown went to her infant son James VI, who was brought up as a Protestant. Mary was imprisoned and later executed by the English queen Elizabeth I.

=== Personal union and republican phase ===
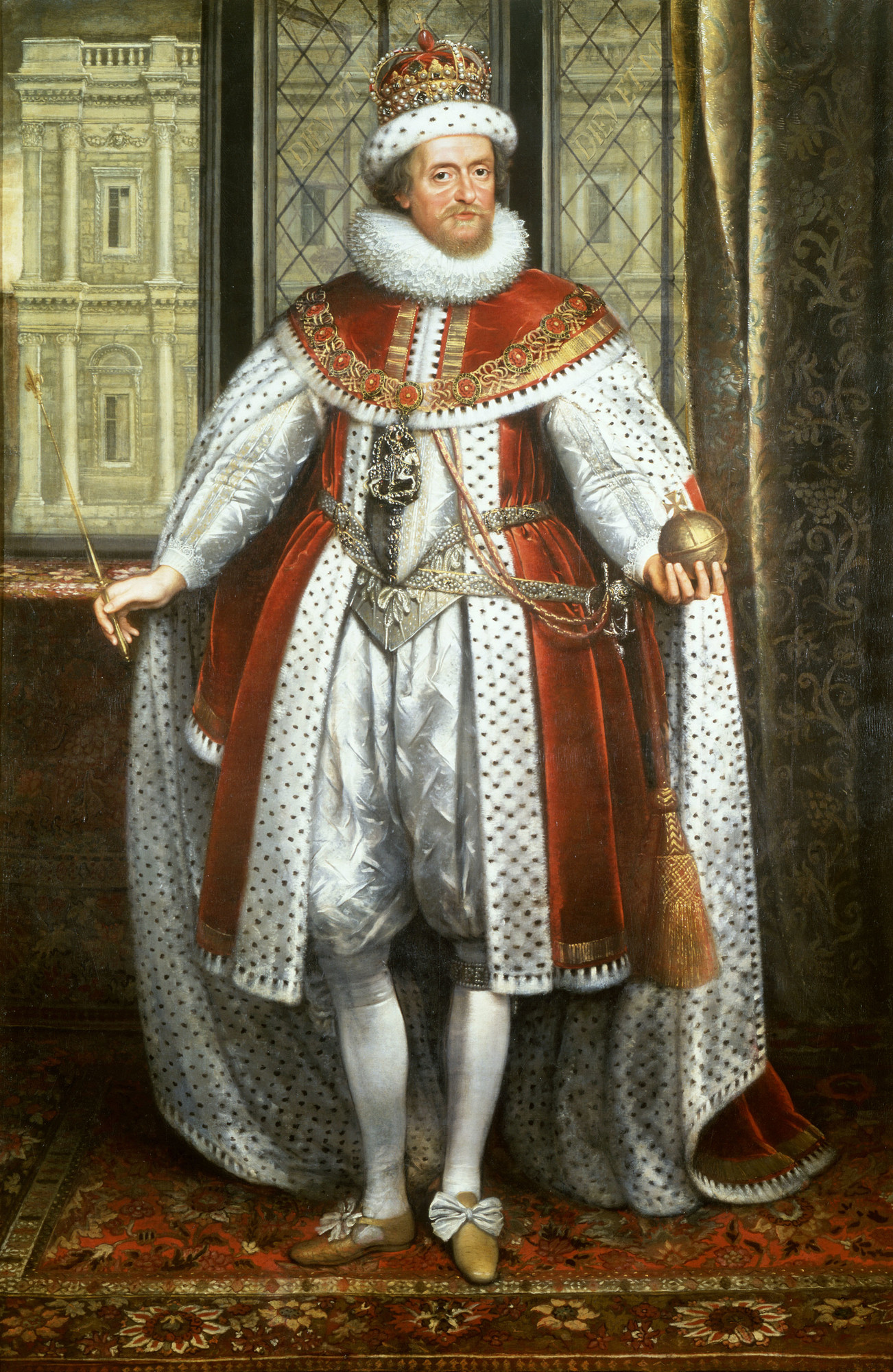
In 1603 James VI and I became the first monarch to rule over England, Scotland, and Ireland together.

Elizabeth I's death in 1603 ended Tudor rule in England. Since she had no children, she was succeeded by the Scottish monarch James VI, who was the great-grandson of Henry VIII's older sister and hence Elizabeth's first cousin twice removed. James VI ruled in England as James I after what was known as the "Union of the Crowns". Although England and Scotland were in personal union under one monarch – James I & VI became the first monarch to style himself "King of Great Britain" in 1604 – they remained two separate kingdoms. James I & VI's successor, Charles I, experienced frequent conflicts with the English Parliament related to the issue of royal and parliamentary powers, especially the power to impose taxes. He provoked opposition by ruling without Parliament from 1629 to 1640, unilaterally levying taxes and adopting controversial religious policies (many of which were offensive to the Scottish Presbyterians and the English Puritans). His attempt to enforce Anglicanism led to organised rebellion in Scotland and ignited the Wars of the Three Kingdoms. In 1642, the conflict between the king and Parliament reached its climax and the English Civil War began.

The Civil War culminated in the execution of the king in 1649, the overthrow of the English monarchy, and the establishment of the Commonwealth of England. Charles I's son, Charles II, was proclaimed King of Great Britain in Scotland, but he was forced to flee abroad after he invaded England and was defeated at the Battle of Worcester. In 1653, Oliver Cromwell, the most prominent military and political leader in the nation, seized power and declared himself Lord Protector (effectively becoming a military dictator, refusing the title of king). Cromwell ruled until his death in 1658, when he was succeeded by his son Richard. The new Lord Protector had little interest in governing, and he soon resigned. The lack of clear leadership led to civil and military unrest, and to a popular desire to restore the monarchy. In 1660, the monarchy was restored and Charles II returned to Britain.

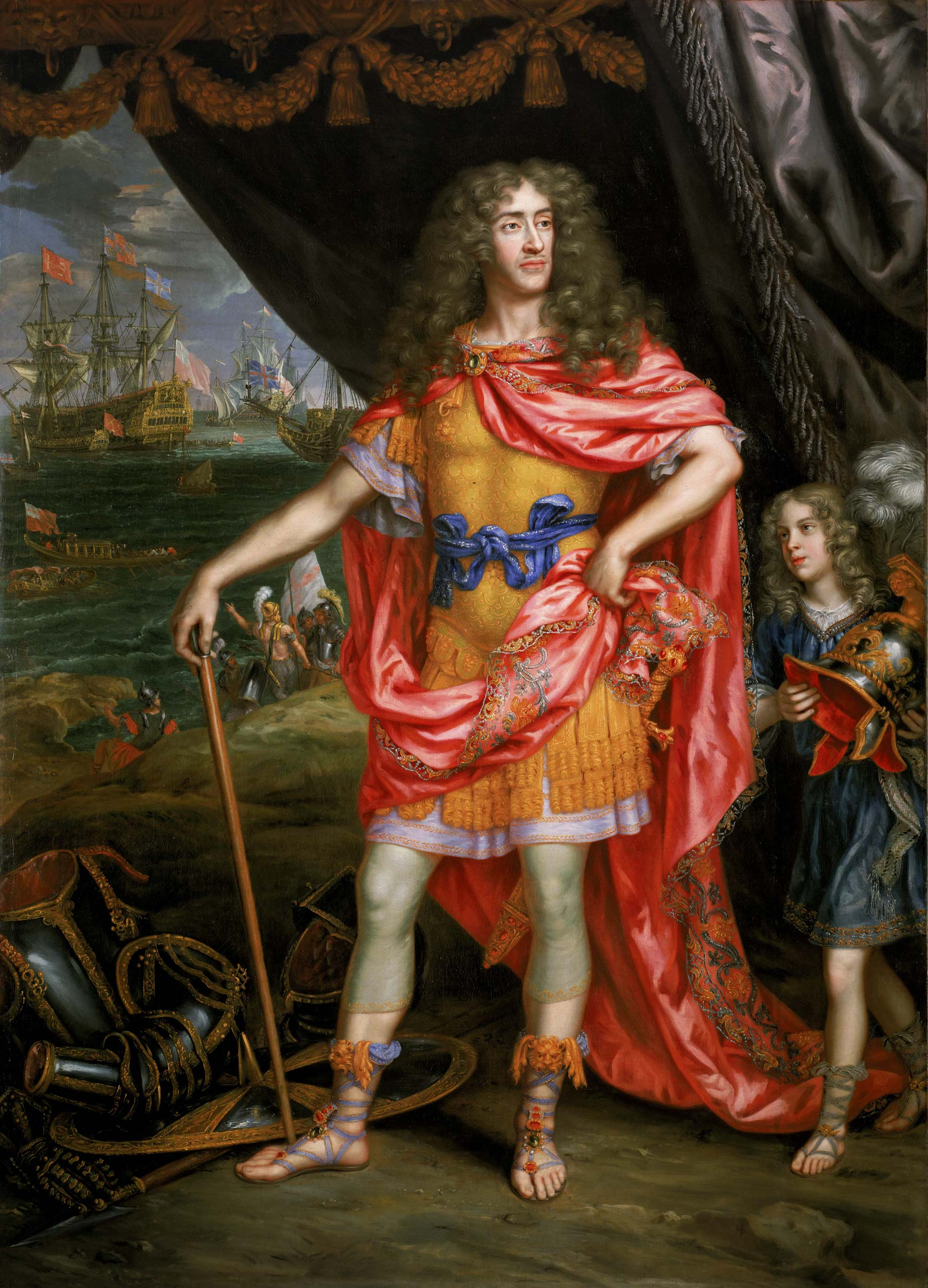
James II was removed from the throne in the Glorious Revolution.

Charles II's reign was marked by the development of the first modern political parties in England. Charles had no legitimate children and was due to be succeeded by his Roman Catholic brother, James, Duke of York. A parliamentary effort to exclude James from the line of succession arose; the "Petitioners", who supported exclusion, became the Whig Party, whereas the "Abhorrers", who opposed exclusion, became the Tory Party. The Exclusion Bill failed; on several occasions, Charles II dissolved Parliament because he feared that the bill might pass. After the dissolution of the Parliament of 1681, Charles ruled without a Parliament until his death in 1685. When James succeeded Charles, he pursued a policy of offering religious tolerance to Separatists and Roman Catholics, thereby drawing the ire of many of his subjects, who suspected his real aim was to reestablish Catholicism. The Tories were committed to the Church of England, and the Whigs were committed to parliamentary authority. Many opposed James's decisions to maintain a large standing army, appoint Roman Catholics to high political and military offices, and imprison Church of England clerics who challenged his policies. As a result, a group of Protestants known as the Immortal Seven invited James II & VII's daughter Mary and her husband William III of Orange to depose the king. William obliged, arriving in England on 5 November 1688 to great public support. Faced with the defection of many of his Protestant officials, James fled the realm and William and Mary (rather than James II & VII's Catholic son) were declared joint Sovereigns of England, Scotland and Ireland.

James's overthrow, known as the Glorious Revolution, was one of the most important events in the long evolution of parliamentary power. The Bill of Rights 1689 affirmed parliamentary supremacy and declared that the English people held certain rights, including freedom from taxes imposed without parliamentary consent. The Bill of Rights required future monarchs to be Protestants and provided that, after any children of William and Mary, Mary's sister Anne would inherit the Crown. Mary II died childless in 1694, leaving William III & II as the sole monarch. By 1700, a political crisis arose, as all of Anne's children had died, leaving her as the only individual left in the line of succession. Parliament was afraid that the former James II or his supporters, known as Jacobites, might attempt to reclaim the throne. Parliament passed the Act of Settlement 1701, which excluded James and his Catholic relations from the succession and made William's nearest Protestant relations, the family of Sophia, Electress of Hanover, next in line to the throne after his sister-in-law Anne. Soon after the passage of the Act, William III & II died, leaving the Crown to Anne.

=== After the 1707 Acts of Union ===
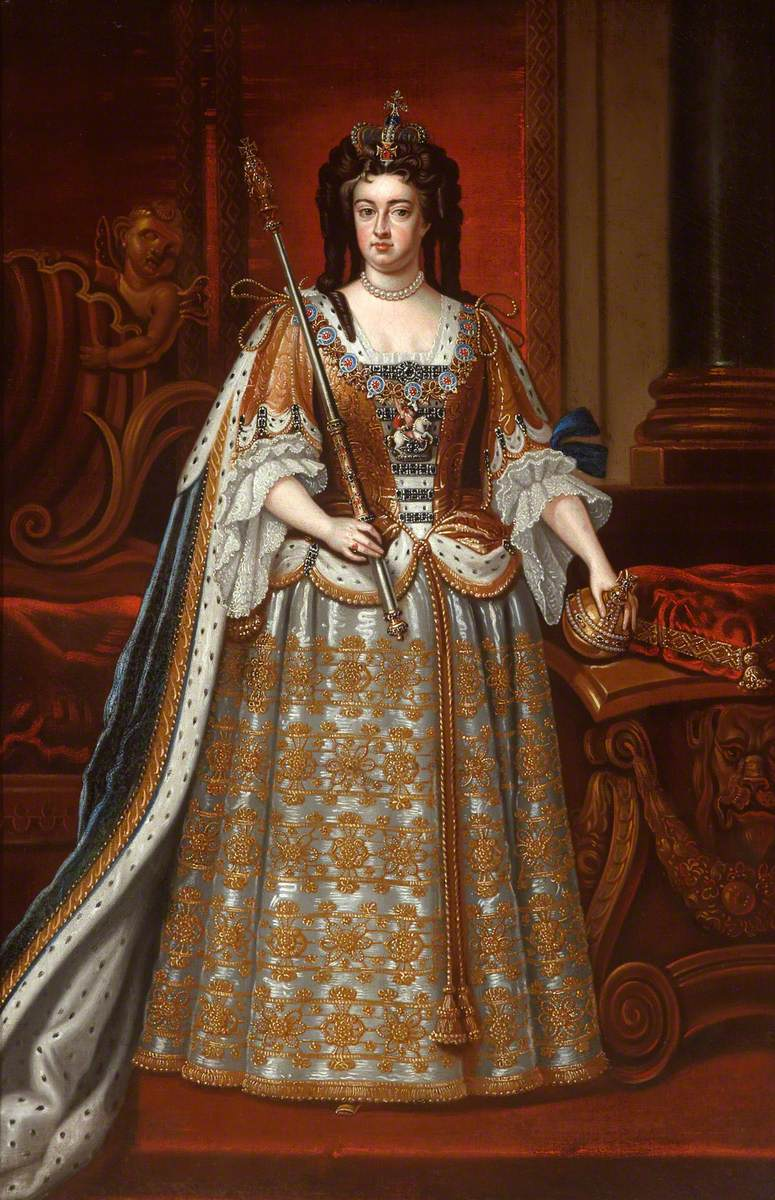
England and Scotland were united as the Kingdom of Great Britain under Queen Anne in 1707.

After Anne's accession, the problem of succession re-emerged. The Scottish Parliament, infuriated that the English Parliament did not consult them on the choice of Sophia's family as the next heirs, passed the Act of Security 1704, threatening to end the personal union between England and Scotland. The Parliament of England retaliated with the Alien Act 1705, threatening to devastate the Scottish economy by restricting trade. The Scottish and English parliaments negotiated the Acts of Union 1707, under which England and Scotland were united into a single Kingdom of Great Britain, with succession under the rules prescribed by the Act of Settlement.

In 1714, Queen Anne was succeeded by her second cousin, and Sophia's son, George I, Elector of Hanover, who consolidated his position by defeating Jacobite rebellions in 1715 and 1719. The new monarch was less active in government than many of his British predecessors, but retained control over his German kingdoms, with which Britain was now in personal union. Power shifted towards George's ministers, especially to Robert Walpole, who is often considered the first British prime minister, although the title was not then in use.

The next monarch, George II, witnessed the end of the Jacobite threat in 1746 when the Catholic Stuarts were completely defeated. During the long reign of his grandson, George III, thirteen of Britain's American colonies were lost when they formed the United States of America after the American Revolutionary War, but British influence elsewhere in the world continued to grow. The United Kingdom of Great Britain and Ireland was created by the Acts of Union 1800.

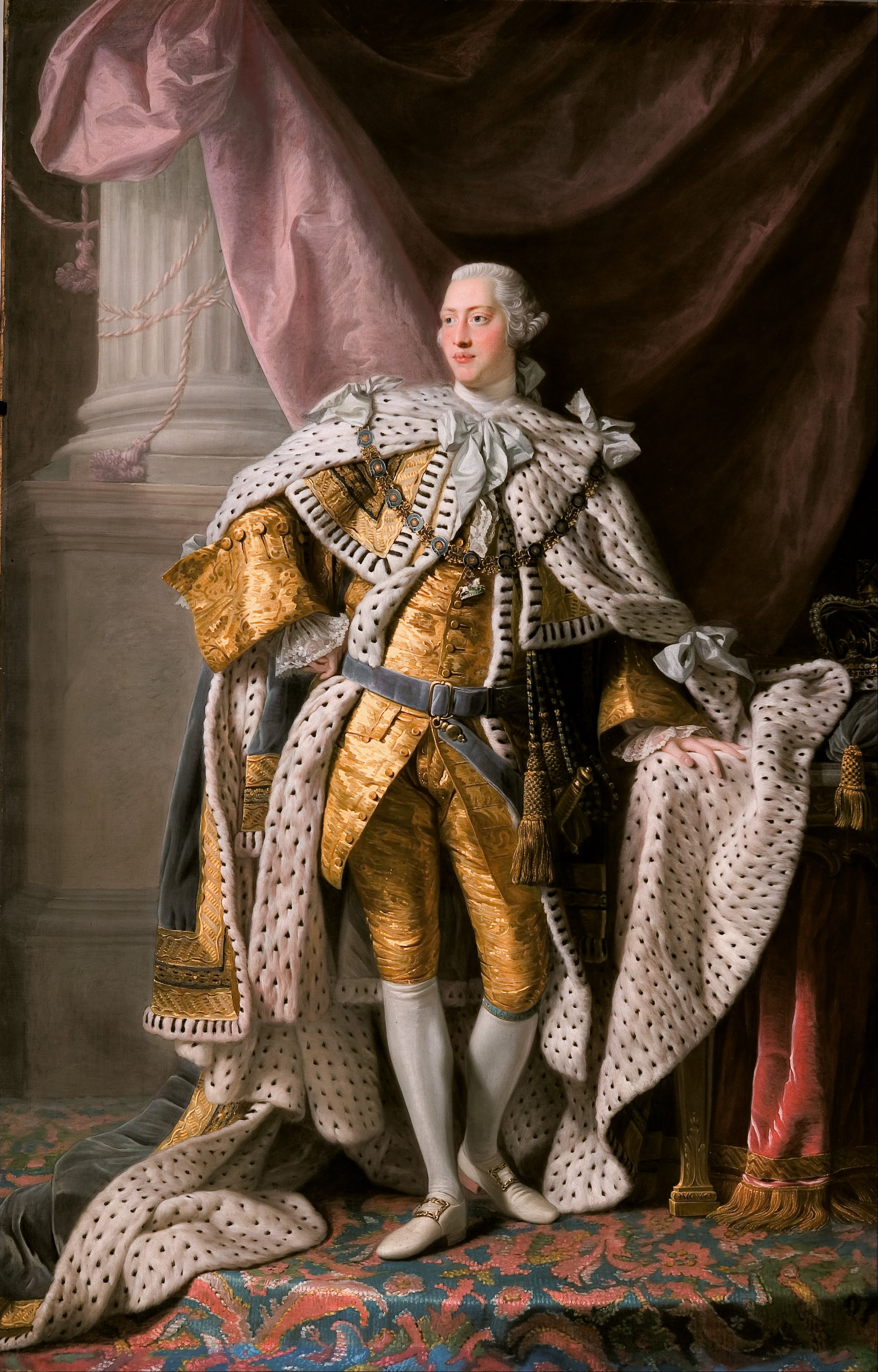
The union of Great Britain and Ireland into the United Kingdom occurred in 1801 under George III.

From 1811 to 1820, George III was rendered incapable of ruling by a mental illness. His son, the future George IV, ruled in his stead as regent. During the Regency and his own reign, the power of the monarchy declined, and by the time of his successor, William IV, the monarch was no longer able to interfere effectively with parliamentary power. In 1834, William dismissed the Whig Prime Minister, William Lamb, 2nd Viscount Melbourne, and appointed a Tory, Robert Peel. In the ensuing elections, however, Peel lost. The king had no choice but to recall Lord Melbourne. During William IV's reign, the Reform Act 1832, which reformed parliamentary representation, was passed. Together with others passed later in the century, the Act led to an expansion of the electoral franchise and the rise of the House of Commons as the most important branch of Parliament.

The final transition to a constitutional monarchy was made during the long reign of William IV's successor, Victoria. As a woman, Victoria could not rule Hanover, which permitted succession only in the male line, so the personal union of the United Kingdom and Hanover came to an end. The Victorian era was marked by great cultural change, technological progress, and the establishment of the United Kingdom as one of the world's foremost powers. In recognition of British rule over India, Victoria was declared Empress of India in 1876. However, her reign was also marked by increased support for the republican movement, due in part to Victoria's permanent mourning and lengthy period of seclusion following the death of her husband in 1861.

Victoria's son, Edward VII, became the first monarch of the House of Saxe-Coburg and Gotha in 1901. In 1917, the next monarch, George V, changed "Saxe-Coburg and Gotha" to "Windsor" in response to the anti-German sentiment aroused by the First World War. George V's reign was marked by the separation of Ireland into Northern Ireland, which remained a part of the United Kingdom, and the Irish Free State, an independent nation, in 1922.

=== Shared monarchy ===
During the twentieth century, the Commonwealth of Nations evolved from the British Empire. Prior to 1926, the British Crown reigned over the British Empire collectively; the Dominions and Crown Colonies were subordinate to the United Kingdom. The Balfour Declaration of 1926 gave complete self-government to the Dominions, effectively creating a system whereby a single monarch operated independently in each separate Dominion. The concept was solidified by the Statute of Westminster 1931, which has been likened to "a treaty among the Commonwealth countries".

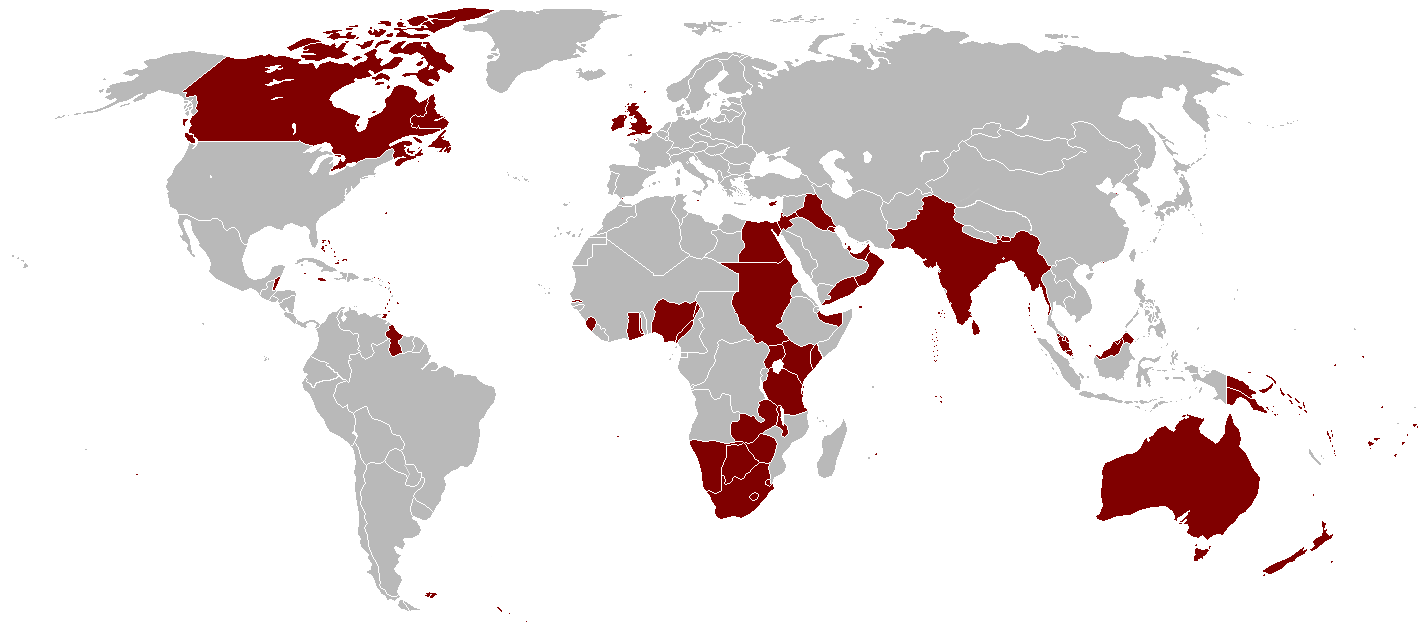
The British Empire at its territorial peak in 1921

The monarchy thus ceased to be an exclusively British institution, although it is often still referred to as "British" for legal and historical reasons and for convenience. The monarch became separately monarch of the United Kingdom, Canada, Australia, New Zealand, and so forth; one person reigning in multiple distinct sovereign states, in a relationship likened to a personal union.

George V's death in 1936 was followed by the accession of Edward VIII, who caused a public scandal by announcing his desire to marry the divorced American Wallis Simpson, even though the Church of England opposed the remarriage of divorcees. Accordingly, Edward announced his intention to abdicate; the Parliaments of the United Kingdom and of other Commonwealth countries granted his request. Edward VIII and any children by his new wife were excluded from the line of succession, and the Crown went to his brother, George VI. George served as a rallying figure for the British people during World War II, making morale-boosting visits to the troops as well as to munitions factories and areas bombed by Nazi Germany. In June 1948 George VI relinquished the title Emperor of India, although remaining head of state of the Dominion of India.

At first, every member of the Commonwealth retained the same monarch as the United Kingdom, but when the Dominion of India became a republic in 1950, it would no longer share in a common monarchy. Instead, the British monarch was acknowledged as "Head of the Commonwealth" in all Commonwealth member states, whether they were realms or republics. The position is purely ceremonial, and is not inherited by the British monarch as of right but is vested in an individual chosen by the Commonwealth heads of government. Member states of the Commonwealth that share the same person as monarch are informally known as Commonwealth realms.

=== Monarchy in Ireland ===
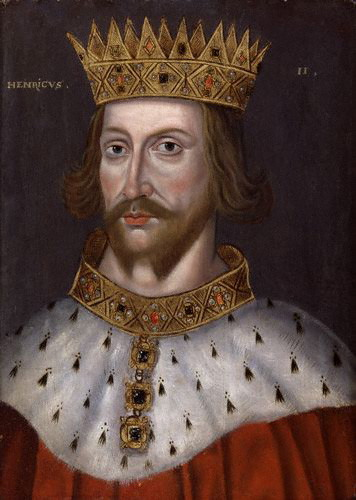
Henry II took the Lordship of Ireland in the 12th century.

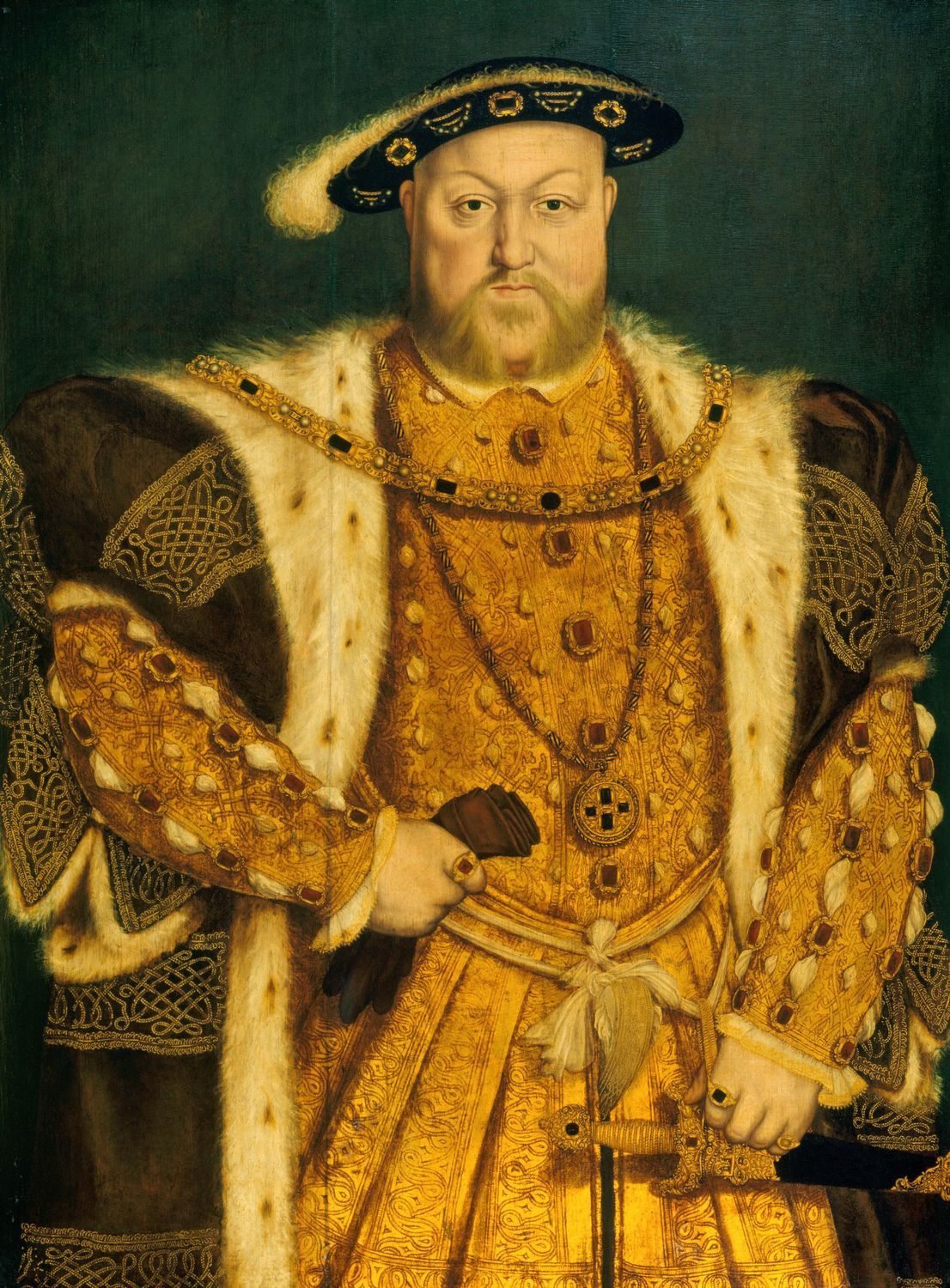
Henry VIII raised it to a kingdom in the 16th century.

In 1155 the only English Pope, Adrian IV, authorised King Henry II of England to take possession of Ireland as a feudal territory nominally under papal overlordship. The Pope wanted the English monarch to annex Ireland and bring the Irish church into line with Rome, despite this process already being underway in Ireland by 1155. An all-island kingship of Ireland had been created in 854 by Máel Sechnaill mac Máele Ruanaid. His last successor was Ruaidrí Ua Conchobair, who had become High King of Ireland in early 1166 and exiled Diarmait Mac Murchada, the King of Leinster, a vassal kingdom. Diarmait asked Henry II for help, gaining a group of Anglo-Norman aristocrats and adventurers, led by Richard de Clare, 2nd Earl of Pembroke, to help him regain his throne. Diarmait and his Anglo-Norman allies succeeded and he became King of Leinster again. De Clare married Diarmait's daughter, and when Diarmait died in 1171, de Clare became King of Leinster. Henry was afraid that de Clare would make Ireland a rival Norman kingdom, so he took advantage of the papal bull and invaded, forcing de Clare and the other Anglo-Norman aristocrats in Ireland and the major Irish kings and lords to recognise him as their overlord.

By 1542, King Henry VIII of England had broken with the Church of Rome and declared himself Supreme Head of the Church of England. The Pope's grant of Ireland to the English monarch became invalid, so Henry summoned a meeting of the Irish Parliament to change his title from Lord of Ireland to King of Ireland.

In 1800, as a result of the Irish Rebellion of 1798, the Act of Union merged the Kingdom of Great Britain and the Kingdom of Ireland into the United Kingdom of Great Britain and Ireland. The whole island of Ireland continued to be a part of the United Kingdom until 1922 when what is now the Republic of Ireland won independence as the Irish Free State, a separate Dominion within the Commonwealth. The Irish Free State was renamed Ireland in 1937, and in 1949 declared itself a republic, left the Commonwealth and severed all ties with the monarchy. Northern Ireland remained within the Union. In 1927, the United Kingdom changed its name to the United Kingdom of Great Britain and Northern Ireland, while the monarch's style for the next twenty years became "of Great Britain, Ireland and the British Dominions beyond the Seas, King, Defender of the Faith, Emperor of India".

=== Modern status and popularity ===
In the 1990s, republicanism in the United Kingdom grew, partly on account of negative publicity associated with the royal family (for instance, immediately following the death of Diana, Princess of Wales). However, The Independent maintained polls from 2002 to 2007 showed that around 70–80% of the British public supported the continuation of the monarchy. In September 2022, shortly after the death of Elizabeth II, The Guardian reported that a YouGov poll showed that 68% of British people felt positively about the monarchy. The newspaper speculated that some of this may have been a reaction to the Queen's death, and said it showed dissatisfaction is higher among young people; 47% of people aged between 18 and 24 wanted the monarchy to continue, compared to 86% aged 65 and over. In May 2022, before the Queen's death, the newspaper reported that polling showed 33% of those aged between 18 and 24 wanted the monarchy to continue. In January 2023, a YouGov survey of roughly 1,700 UK people found that 64% thought that the country should continue to have a monarchy.

== Religious role ==
The sovereign is the supreme governor of the established Church of England. Archbishops and bishops are appointed by the monarch, on the advice of the prime minister, who chooses the appointee from a list of nominees prepared by a Church Commission. The Crown's role in the Church of England is titular; the most senior clergyman, the Archbishop of Canterbury, is the spiritual leader of the Church and of the worldwide Anglican Communion. The monarch takes an oath to preserve the Church of Scotland and he or she holds the power to appoint the Lord High Commissioner to the Church's General Assembly, but otherwise plays no part in its governance, and exerts no powers over it. The sovereign plays no formal role in the disestablished Church in Wales or Church of Ireland.

== Succession ==
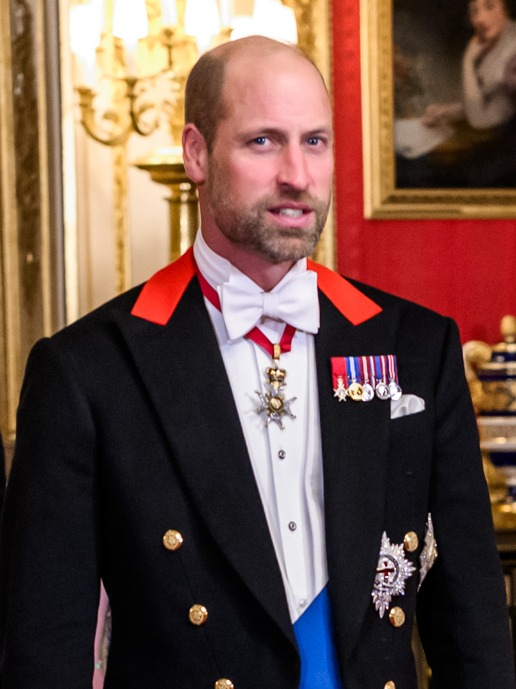
William, Prince of Wales, heir apparent to the British throne

The relationship between the Commonwealth realms is such that any change to the laws governing succession to the shared throne requires the unanimous consent of all the realms. Succession is governed by statutes such as the Bill of Rights 1689, the Act of Settlement 1701 and the Acts of Union 1707. The rules of succession may only be changed by an Act of Parliament; it is not possible for an individual to renounce his or her right of succession. The Act of Settlement restricts the succession to the legitimate Protestant descendants of Sophia of Hanover (1630–1714), a granddaughter of James VI and I.

Upon demise of the Crown (the death of a sovereign), their heir immediately and automatically succeeds (hence the phrase "The king is dead, long live the king!"), and the accession of the new sovereign is publicly proclaimed by an Accession Council that meets at St James's Palace. Upon their accession, a new sovereign is required by law to make and subscribe several oaths: the Accession Declaration as first required by the Bill of Rights, and an oath that they will "maintain and preserve" the Church of Scotland settlement as required by the Act of Union. The monarch is usually crowned in Westminster Abbey, normally by the Archbishop of Canterbury. A coronation is not necessary for a sovereign to reign; indeed, the ceremony usually takes place many months after accession to allow sufficient time for its preparation and for a period of mourning.

When an individual ascends the throne, it is expected they will reign until death. The only voluntary abdication, that of Edward VIII, had to be authorised by a special Act of Parliament, His Majesty's Declaration of Abdication Act 1936. The last monarch involuntarily removed from power was James II and VII, who fled into exile in 1688 during the Glorious Revolution.

=== Restrictions by sex and religion ===
Succession was by male-preference cognatic primogeniture, under which sons inherit before daughters, and elder children inherit before younger ones of the same sex. The British prime minister, David Cameron, announced at the 2011 Commonwealth Heads of Government Meeting that all 16 Commonwealth realms, including the United Kingdom, had agreed to abolish the male-preference rule for anyone born after the date of the meeting, 28 October 2011. They also agreed that future monarchs would no longer be prohibited from marrying a Roman Catholic – a law which dated from the Act of Settlement 1701. The provision prohibiting the monarch themself being a Roman Catholic was left in place. The necessary UK legislation making the changes received royal assent on 25 April 2013 and was brought into force in March 2015 after the equivalent legislation was approved in all the other Commonwealth realms.

Though Catholics are prohibited from succeeding and are deemed "naturally dead" for succession purposes, the disqualification does not extend to the individual's legitimate Protestant descendants.

=== Regency ===
The Regency Acts allow for regencies in the event of a monarch who is a minor or who is physically or mentally incapacitated. When a regency is necessary, the next qualified individual in the line of succession automatically becomes regent, unless they themselves are a minor or incapacitated. Special provisions were made for Queen Elizabeth II by the Regency Act 1953, which stated that Prince Philip, Duke of Edinburgh (her husband) could act as regent in these circumstances.

During a temporary physical infirmity or an absence from the kingdom, the sovereign may temporarily delegate some of his or her functions to counsellors of state, chosen from the monarch's spouse and the first four adults in the line of succession. The present counsellors of state are: Queen Camilla; William, Prince of Wales; Prince Harry, Duke of Sussex; Andrew Mountbatten-Windsor; Princess Beatrice; Prince Edward, Duke of Edinburgh; and Anne, Princess Royal. While still able to serve, the Duke of Sussex and Andrew Mountbatten-Windsor no longer carry out royal duties. With the accession of Charles III and planned overseas trips in 2023, it was decided to expand the list of those eligible to serve as counsellors of state. On 14 November 2022, the King sent a message to both Houses of Parliament, formally asking for a change in the law that would allow Princess Anne and Prince Edward to be added to the list of counsellors of state. The next day, a bill to that end was introduced in Parliament and it received royal assent on 6 December, coming into force on 7 December.

== Finances ==
Until 1760, the monarch met all official expenses from hereditary revenues, which included the profits of the Crown Estate (the royal property portfolio). King George III agreed to surrender the hereditary revenues of the Crown in return for the Civil List, and this arrangement persisted until 2012. An annual Property Services grant-in-aid paid for the upkeep of the royal residences, and an annual Royal Travel Grant-in-Aid paid for travel. The Civil List covered most expenses, including those for staffing, state visits, public engagements, and official entertainment. Its size was fixed by Parliament every 10 years; any money saved was carried forward to the next 10-year period. From 2012, the Civil List and Grants-in-Aid were replaced with a single Sovereign Grant, which was initially set at 15% of the revenues generated by the Crown Estate and increased to 25% in March 2017. The programme of overseas visits by the monarch is determined by the Royal Visits Committee, a Cabinet Office committee.

The Crown Estate is one of the largest property portfolios in the United Kingdom, with holdings of £15.6 billion in 2022. It is held in trust, and cannot be sold or owned by the sovereign in a private capacity. In modern times, the profits surrendered from the Crown Estate to the Treasury have exceeded the Sovereign Grant. For example, the Crown Estate produced £312.7 million in the financial year 2021–22, whereas the Sovereign Grant for the monarch was £86.3 million during the same period.

Like the Crown Estate, the land and assets of the Duchy of Lancaster, a property portfolio valued at £383 million in 2011, are held in trust. The revenues of the Duchy form part of the Privy Purse, and are used for expenses not borne by the parliamentary grants. The Paradise Papers, leaked in 2017, show that the Duchy of Lancaster held investments in the British tax havens of the Cayman Islands and Bermuda. The Duchy of Cornwall is a similar estate held in trust to meet the expenses of the monarch's eldest son. The Royal Collection, which includes artworks and the Crown Jewels, is not owned by the sovereign personally and is held in trust, as are the occupied palaces in the United Kingdom such as Buckingham Palace and Windsor Castle.

The sovereign is subject to indirect taxes such as value-added tax, and since 1993 the monarch has paid income tax and capital gains tax on personal income. Parliamentary grants to the sovereign are not treated as income as they are solely for official expenditure. Republicans estimated in 2012 that the real cost of the monarchy, including security and potential income not claimed by the state, such as profits from the duchies of Lancaster and Cornwall and rent of Buckingham Palace and Windsor Castle, was £334 million (equivalent to £463,100,000 in 2024) a year.

Estimates of Queen Elizabeth II's wealth varied, depending on whether assets owned by her personally or held in trust for the nation were included. Forbes magazine estimated her wealth at US$450 million in 2010, but no official figure was available. In 1993, the Lord Chamberlain said estimates of £100 million were "grossly overstated". Jock Colville, who was her former private secretary and a director of her bank, Coutts, estimated her wealth in 1971 at £2 million (the equivalent of about £25 million today). The Sunday Times Rich List 2020 estimated Elizabeth II's personal wealth at £350 million.

== Residences ==
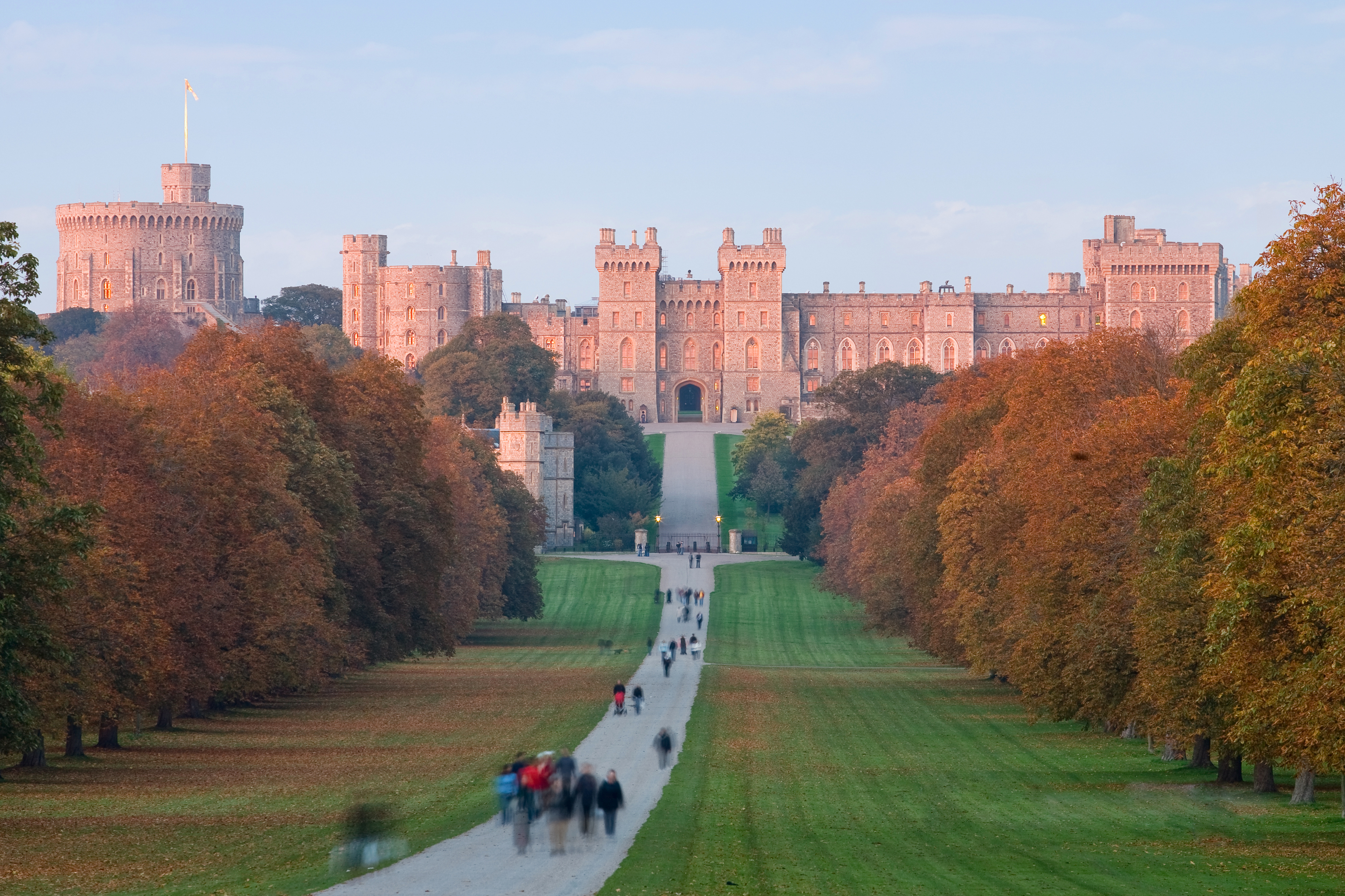
Windsor Castle is a royal residence at Windsor in the English county of Berkshire. It is strongly associated with the English and succeeding British royal family.

The sovereign's official residence in London is Buckingham Palace. It is the site of most state banquets, investitures, royal christenings and other ceremonies. Another official residence is Windsor Castle, the largest occupied castle in the world, which is used principally at weekends, Easter and during Royal Ascot, an annual race meeting that is part of the social calendar. The sovereign's official residence in Scotland is the Palace of Holyroodhouse in Edinburgh. The monarch stays at Holyrood for at least one week each year, and when visiting Scotland on state occasions.

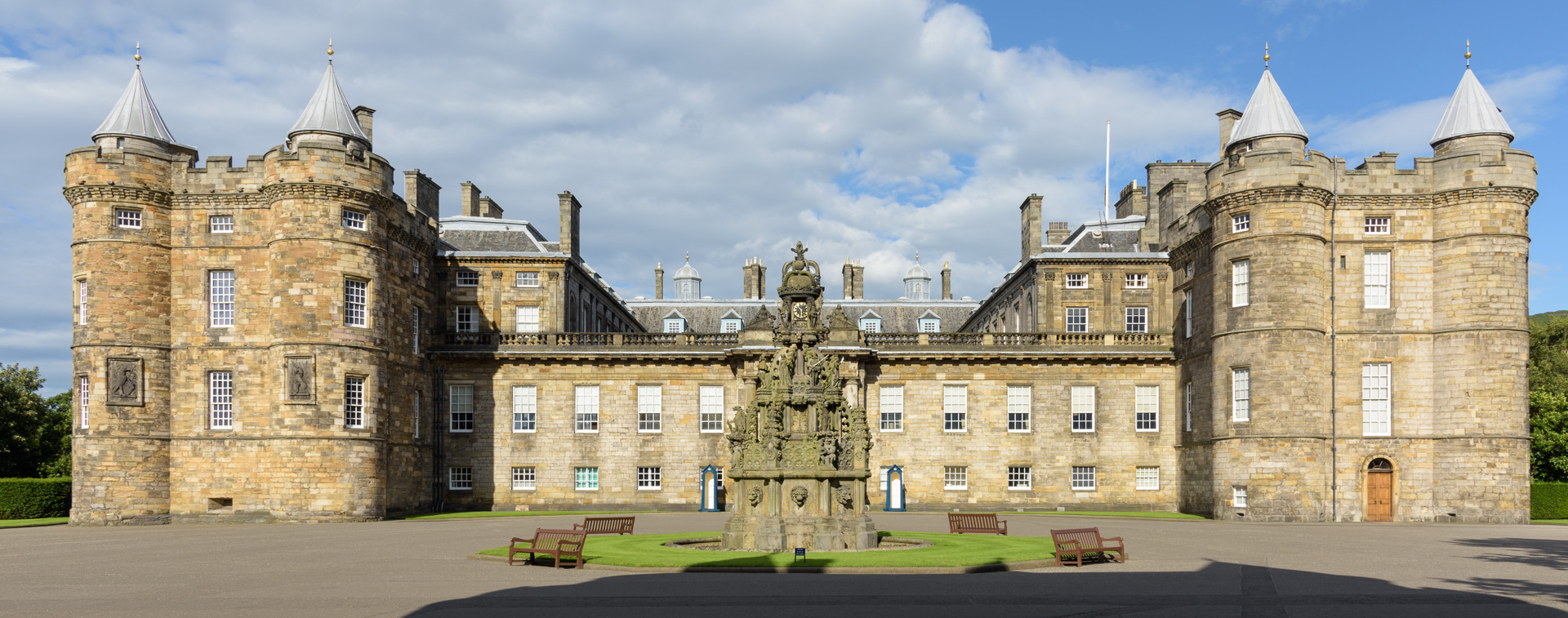
Holyrood Palace, in Edinburgh, Scotland, is the monarch's official Scottish residence.

Historically, the Palace of Westminster and the Tower of London were the main residences of the English monarch until Henry VIII acquired the Palace of Whitehall. Whitehall was destroyed by fire in 1698, leading to a shift to St James's Palace. Although replaced as the monarch's primary London residence by Buckingham Palace in 1837, St James's is still the senior palace and remains the ceremonial royal residence. For example, foreign ambassadors are accredited to the Court of St James's, and the Palace is the site of the meeting of the Accession Council. It is also used by other members of the royal family.

Other residences include Clarence House and Kensington Palace. The palaces belong to the Crown; they are held in trust for future rulers and cannot be sold by the monarch. Sandringham House in Norfolk and Balmoral Castle in Aberdeenshire are privately owned by the monarch.

== Style ==
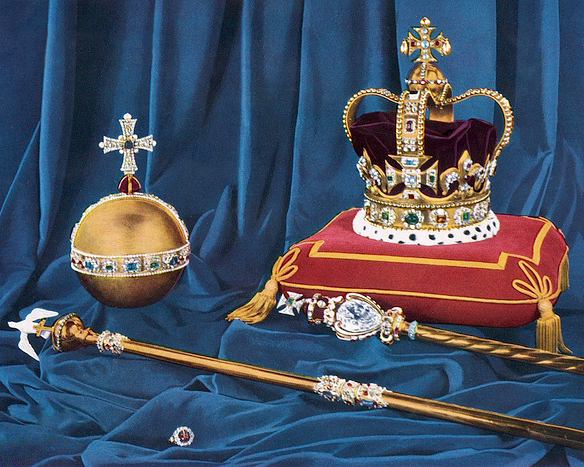
St Edward's Crown, and the sovereign's orb, sceptres and ring.

The present sovereign's full style and title is "Charles the Third, by the Grace of God of the United Kingdom of Great Britain and Northern Ireland and of His other Realms and Territories, King, Head of the Commonwealth, Defender of the Faith". The title "Head of the Commonwealth" is held by the king personally, and is not vested in the British Crown. Pope Leo X first granted the title "Defender of the Faith" to King Henry VIII in 1521, rewarding him for his support of the Papacy during the early years of the Protestant Reformation, particularly for his book the Defence of the Seven Sacraments. After Henry broke from the Roman Catholic Church, Pope Paul III revoked the grant, but Parliament passed a law authorising its continued use.

The sovereign is known as "His Majesty" or "Her Majesty". The form "Britannic Majesty" appears in international treaties and on passports to differentiate the British monarch from foreign rulers. The monarch chooses his or her regnal name, not necessarily his or her first name – George VI, Edward VII and Victoria did not use their first names.

If only one monarch has used a particular name, no ordinal is used; for example, Queen Victoria is not known as "Victoria I", and ordinals are not used for English monarchs who reigned before the Norman conquest of England. The question of whether numbering for British monarchs is based on previous English or Scottish monarchs was raised in 1953 when Scottish nationalists challenged the Queen's use of "Elizabeth II", on the grounds that there had never been an "Elizabeth I" in Scotland. In MacCormick v Lord Advocate, the Scottish Court of Session ruled against the plaintiffs, finding that the Queen's title was a matter of her own choice and prerogative. The Home Secretary told the House of Commons that monarchs since the Acts of Union had consistently used the higher of the English and Scottish ordinals, which in the applicable four cases has been the English ordinal. The prime minister confirmed this practice but noted that "neither The Queen nor her advisers could seek to bind their successors".

== Arms ==
The coat of arms of the United Kingdom is "Quarterly, I and IV Gules three lions passant guardant in pale Or [for England]; II Or a lion rampant within a double tressure flory-counter-flory Gules [for Scotland]; III Azure a harp Or stringed Argent [for Ireland]". The supporters are the Lion and the Unicorn; the motto is "Dieu et mon droit" (French: "God and my Right"). Surrounding the shield is a representation of a Garter bearing the motto of the Chivalric order of the same name; "Honi soit qui mal y pense". (Old French: "Shame be to him who thinks evil of it"). In Scotland, the monarch uses an alternative form of the arms in which quarters I and IV represent Scotland, II England, and III Ireland. The mottoes are "In Defens" (an abbreviated form of the Scots "In my defens God me defend") and the motto of the Order of the Thistle, "'Nemo me impune lacessit" (Latin: "No-one provokes me with impunity"); the supporters are the unicorn and lion, who support both the escutcheon and lances, from which fly the flags of Scotland and England.

The coat of arms of Charles III in the United Kingdom. The design (left) features the arms of England in the first and fourth quarters, Scotland in the second, and Ireland in the third. In Scotland, a separate version is used (right), in which the Arms of Scotland take precedence.

The monarch's official flag in the United Kingdom is the Royal Standard, which depicts the Royal Arms in banner form. It is flown only from buildings, vessels and vehicles in which the sovereign is present. The Royal Standard is never flown at half-mast because there is always a sovereign: when one dies, his or her successor becomes the sovereign instantly.

Royal Standard of the United Kingdom

Royal Standard of the United Kingdom in Scotland

When the monarch is not in residence, the Union Flag is flown at Buckingham Palace, Windsor Castle and Sandringham House, whereas in Scotland the Royal Banner of Scotland is flown at Holyrood Palace and Balmoral Castle.

Union Flag of the United Kingdom

Royal Banner of Scotland

== See also ==
- Family tree of the British royal family
- King-in-Parliament
- Involvement of the British monarchy in slavery
- Law of the United Kingdom
- List of leaders of dependent territories
- Politics of the United Kingdom
