= Pillar Box War =

1950s post box vandalism in Scotland

The Queen's Royal Cypher, surmounted by St Edward's crown

The Pillar Box War refers to a number of politically motivated acts of vandalism against post boxes in Scotland during the early 1950s in a dispute over the correct title in Scotland of the new British monarch, Elizabeth II or Elizabeth I.

== Background ==
Ascending to the throne in February 1952, Elizabeth adopted the royal style of Elizabeth the Second. This was reflected in her royal cypher, which took the Latin form 'EIIR'. Some objected to this usage as the new queen was the first Elizabeth to reign over the United Kingdom or indeed Great Britain, Elizabeth I having been the queen of the former kingdoms of England and Ireland but not Scotland.

In 1953, John MacCormick took legal action against the Lord Advocate in the case of MacCormick v Lord Advocate, challenging the Queen's right to call herself Elizabeth the Second. The case failed on the grounds that the matter was within the royal prerogative, and thus the Queen was free to adopt any title she saw fit.

== Actions and legacy ==
A Royal Mail van in Scotland showing the omission of the Royal Cypher

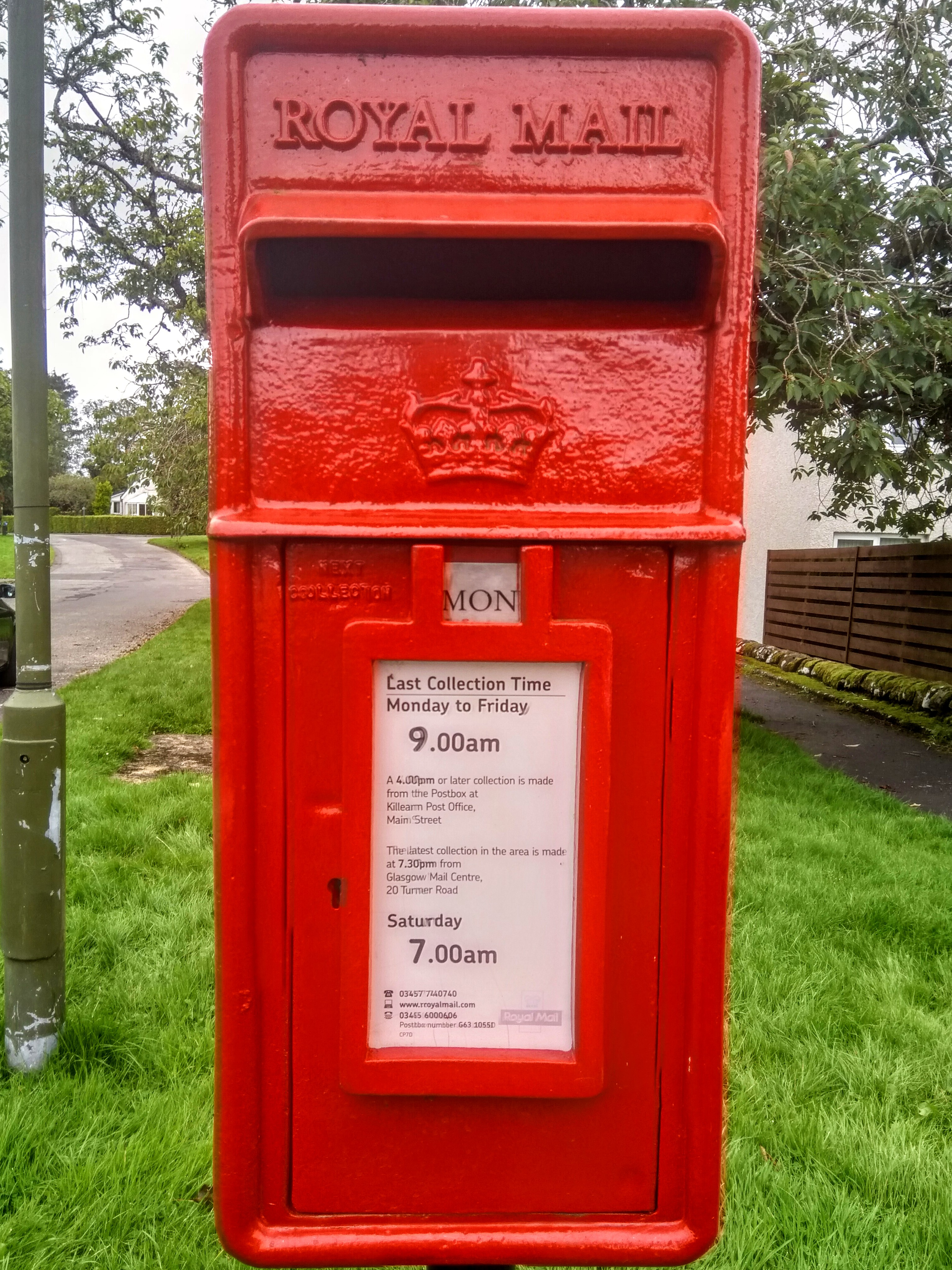
Post-1954 pattern Royal Mail lamp post box of the type used in Scotland, showing the Crown of Scotland

Some occasions of vandalism and even explosions of post boxes which carried the Queen's 'EIIR' insignia were recorded. One particular pillar box in Edinburgh's Inch district was repeatedly vandalised with tar, paint and a hammer before being blown to pieces less than three months after its unveiling.

The folk songs Sky High Joe and The Ballad of the Inch commemorate these events.

After 1953, new post boxes were placed in Scotland carrying only the Crown of Scotland image rather than the 'EIIR' cypher, which continued to be used in the rest of the United Kingdom, and indeed in some of the Queen's other realms and territories. A post box with the 'EIIR' cypher was installed in Dunoon in 2018 and immediately scheduled for replacement on discovery of the error.

Charles III's cypher will also not be included on Scottish post boxes, despite the fact that Charles II also reigned over Scotland.

== See also ==
- Royal cypher
