= Regnal number =

Concept in heraldry

Regnal numbers are ordinal numbers—often written as Roman numerals—used to distinguish among persons with the same regnal name who held the same office, notably kings, queens regnant, popes, and rarely princes and princesses.

It is common to start counting either since the beginning of the monarchy, or since the beginning of a particular line of state succession. For example, Boris III of Bulgaria and his son Simeon II were given their regnal numbers because the medieval rulers of the First and Second Bulgarian Empire were counted as well, although the recent dynasty dates only back to 1878 and is only distantly related to the monarchs of previous Bulgarian states. On the other hand, the kings of England and kings of Great Britain and the United Kingdom are counted starting with the Norman Conquest. That is why the son of Henry III of England is called Edward I, even though there were three English monarchs named Edward before the Conquest (they were distinguished by epithets instead).

Sometimes legendary or fictional persons are included. For example, the Swedish kings Eric XIV (reigned 1560–68) and Charles IX (1604–11) took ordinals based on a fanciful 1544 history by Johannes Magnus, which invented six kings of each name before those accepted by later historians. A list of Swedish monarchs, represented on the map of the Estates of the Swedish Crown, produced by French engraver Jacques Chiquet (1673–1721) and published in Paris in 1719, starts with Canute I and shows Eric XIV and Charles IX as Eric IV and Charles II respectively; the only Charles holding his traditional ordinal in the list is Charles XII. Also, in the case of Emperor Menelik II of Ethiopia, he chose his regnal number with reference to a mythical ancestor and first sovereign of his country (a supposed son of biblical King Solomon) to underline his legitimacy into the so-called Solomonic dynasty.

== Examples of monarchical ordinals ==
Monarchs with the same given name are distinguished by their ordinals:

- Kings Umberto I and Umberto II of Italy
- Empresses Catherine I and Catherine II of Russia
- Princes Rainier II and Rainier III of Monaco
- Popes Benedict XV and Benedict XVI

Ordinals may also apply where a ruler of one realm and a ruler of that realm's successor state share the same name:

- Queens Elizabeth I of England and Elizabeth II of the United Kingdom
- Kings Alfonso XI of Castile and Alfonso XII of Spain
- Kings Victor Emmanuel I of Sardinia and Victor Emmanuel II of Italy
- Kings Peter I of Serbia and Peter II of Yugoslavia

=== Double names ===
Practice varies where monarchs go by two or more given names. For Swedish monarchs, the ordinal qualifies only the first name; for example, Gustav VI Adolf, known as "Gustav Adolf", was the sixth Gustav/Gustaf, but the third Gustav Adolf. By contrast, the Kingdom of Prussia was ruled in turn by Friedrich I, Friedrich Wilhelm I, Friedrich II, and Friedrich Wilhelm II; and later by Wilhelm I. Likewise Pope John Paul I, who chose his double name to honour predecessors John XXIII and Paul VI, and was succeeded by John Paul II.

=== Ordinals for non-reigning royalty ===
In any case, it is usual to count only the monarchs or heads of the family, and to number them sequentially up to the end of the dynasty. A notable exception to this rule is the German House of Reuss. This family has the particularity that every male member during the last eight centuries was named Heinrich, and all of them, not only the head of the family, were numbered. While the members of the elder branch were numbered in order of birth until the extinction of the branch in 1927, the members of the younger line were (and still are) numbered in sequences that began and ended roughly as centuries began and ended. This explains why the current (since 2012) head of the Reuss family is called Heinrich XIV, his late father Heinrich IV and his sons Heinrich XXIX and Heinrich V.

It is rare, but some German princely families number all males whether head of the family or not; for example, Hans Heinrich XV von Hochberg was preceded as Prince of Pless by Hans Heinrich XI and succeeded by Hans Heinrich XVII; the ordinals XII, XIII, XIV, and XVI were borne by von Hochbergs who were not Prince of Pless. Similarly for the House of Reuss, where all men were numbered Heinrichs and some were reigning Princes of Reuss-Gera or Reuss-Greiz.

Pretenders and rulers of formerly deposed dynasties are often given regnal numbers as if non-reigning pretenders had actually ruled. For example Louis XVIII of France took a regnal number that implicitly asserts that Louis XVII had been king, though he never reigned; his pretendership was during the French First Republic. A similar case is that of Napoleon III whose regnal number implicitly asserts a ruling Napoleon II. Louis XVIII numbered his regnal year from the death of Louis XVII, something Napoleon III never did.

== History ==
Almost all West European monarchs and popes after medieval times have used ordinals. Ordinals are also retrospectively applied to earlier monarchs in most works of reference, at least as far as they are not easy to distinguish from each other by any other systematical means. In several cases, various sorts of "semi-regnal" members of dynasties are also numeraled, to facilitate their individuality in works of reference – in cases such as co-regents, crown princes, succession-conveying consorts, prime ministers and deputy monarchs. In the first centuries after the Middle Ages, the use was sometimes sporadic, but became established by the 18th century. In the past couple of centuries, European monarchs without an official ordinal have been rarities.

As a rule of thumb, medieval European monarchs did not use ordinals at their own time, and those who used were rarities and even their use was sporadic. Ordinals for monarchs before the 13th century are anachronisms, as are also ordinals for almost all later medieval monarchs. Still, they are often used, because they are a practical way of distinguishing between different historical monarchs who had the same name.

Popes were apparently the first to assume official ordinals for their reigns, although this occurred only in the last centuries of the Middle Ages. It is clear, from renumberings of Popes John XV–XIX and Popes Stephen II–IX, that as of the 11th century the popes did not yet use established ordinals. The official, self-confirmed numbering of John XXI means that at latest from the 13th century the popes did take official ordinals in their accession.

Emperor Frederick II, King Charles II of Naples, King Premislas II of Poland and King Magnus VI of Norway (as Magnus IV) evidently used ordinals sometimes during their reign. In the 14th century, Emperor Charles IV sometimes used that ordinal. Presumably, use of the ordinal of king Frederick III of Sicily also is contemporaneous. The royal chroniclers of the Abbey of Saint-Denis were using ordinals to refer to the French kings as early as the thirteenth century with the practise entering common usage among royalty and the nobility by the late fourteenth century. The British tradition of consistently and prevalently numbering monarchs dates back to Henry VIII and Mary I; however, sporadic use occurred at least as early as the reign of Edward III. Some early accounts of Edward I number him the fourth, thus including the three pre-Norman Edwards.

The long history of the papacy has led to difficulties in some cases. For example, Stephen was only pope for three days before dying of apoplexy, and was never consecrated. Because not all list-makers count him as having been pope (as Stephen II), there has been some confusion in regard to later popes who chose the name Stephen. Later Stephens are sometimes numbered with parentheses, e.g., his immediate successor (in name) is denoted either Stephen (II) III or Stephen III (II). The church did consider Stephen II a pope until 1960, when he was removed from the list of popes in 1961. The history of the numbering of popes taking the regnal name "John" is even more convoluted, owing to the long history of popes taking the name (a common name, chosen frequently to honour the Apostle), bad record-keeping, and political confusion; among other results, the regnal name "John XX" is completely skipped under all reckonings.

== Personal unions ==
In the case of personal unions, some monarchs have had more than one ordinal, because they had different ordinals in their different realms. For instance, Charles XV of Sweden was also king of Norway, but in Norway he went under the name Charles IV. The Swedish-Norwegian union was in force 1814–1905 and both realms had had kings called Charles before the union, but Sweden had had more kings by that name.

In the event of one kingdom achieving independence from another but retaining the same monarch, the monarch often retains the same number as was already used in the older realm. King Christian X of Denmark thus became King Christian X of Iceland when Iceland became an independent kingdom in personal union with Denmark in 1918. The same is true for Commonwealth realms, where the monarch retains the regnal number from the British line of monarchs (see below).

=== Ordinals and the British Acts of Union 1707 ===
Beginning in 1603, when England and Scotland began to share a monarch but were still legally separate realms, their monarchs were numbered separately. The king who began the personal union was James VI of Scotland who was also James I of England, and his name is often written (especially in Scotland) as James VI and I. Similarly, his grandson is James VII and II. Mary II's ordinal coincidentally relates to both her predecessors Mary I of England and Mary, Queen of Scots; her co-sovereign husband is William III and II (here the English number is first). Charles I and Charles II had a name not used in either country before 1603.

==== Acts of Union ====
After the realms were united with the Acts of Union 1707, separate numbers were not needed for the next five monarchs: Anne and the four Georges. However, when William IV acceded in 1830, he was not called William III in Scotland. (George Croly pointed out in 1830 the new king was William I, II, III, and IV: of Hanover, Ireland, Scotland, and England respectively.) Nor were Edward VII and Edward VIII known as Edward I and Edward II (or possibly II and III, if one counts the disputed reign of Edward Balliol) of Scotland. These kings all followed the numbering consistent with the English sequence of sovereigns (which, incidentally, was also the higher of the two numbers in all occurring cases). This was not without controversy in Scotland, however; for example, Edward VII's regnal number was occasionally omitted in Scotland, even by the established Church of Scotland, in deference to protests that the previous Edwards were English kings who had "been excluded from Scotland by battle".

Last British monarchs of their names (disputed monarchs in italics)
	Last Monarch	End of Reign
Charles	Charles III	Current
Elizabeth	Elizabeth II (Elizabeth I in Scotland)	2022
George	George VI	1952
Edward	Edward VIII (Edward II or III in Scotland)	1936
Victoria	Victoria (I)	1901
William	William IV (William III in Scotland)	1837
United Kingdom (1801)
Anne	Anne (I)	1714
Union of Crowns (1707)
Mary	Mary II of England and Scotland	1694
James	James VII of Scotland and II of England	1688
Personal Union (1603)
Philip	Philip (I) of England	1558
Jane	Jane (I) of England	1553
Henry	Henry VIII of England	1547
Richard	Richard III of England	1485
Robert	Robert III of Scotland	1406
David	David II of Scotland	1371
John (Scotland)	John (I) of Scotland	1296
Margaret	Margaret (I) of Scotland	1290
Alexander	Alexander III of Scotland	1286
John (England)	John (I) of England	1216
Malcolm	Malcolm IV of Scotland	1165
Stephen	Stephen (I) of England	1154
Matilda	Matilda (I) of England	1148
Edgar	Edgar (I) of Scotland	1107
Donald	Donald III of Scotland	1097
Duncan	Duncan II of Scotland	1094
The Conquest (1066); numbering in England resets
Lulach	Lulach (I) of Scotland	1058
Macbeth	Macbeth (I) of Scotland	1057
Kenneth	Kenneth III of Scotland	1005
Constantine	Constantine III of Scotland	997
Amlaíb	Amlaíb (I) of Scotland	977
Cuilén	Cuilén (I) of Scotland	971
Dub	Dub (I) of Scotland	967
Indulf	Indulf (I) of Scotland	962
Eochaid	Eochaid (I) of Scotland	889
Giric	Giric (I) of Scotland	889
Áed	Áed (I) of Scotland	878
Foundation of Scotland (843)

==== Current state ====
The issue arose again with the accession of Queen Elizabeth II, as Scotland had never before had a regnant Queen Elizabeth, the previous queen of that name having been queen of England only. Objections were raised, and sustained, to the use of the royal cypher EIIR anywhere in Scotland, resulting in several violent incidents, including the destruction of one of the first new EIIR pillar boxes in Scotland, at Leith in late 1952. Since that time, the cipher used in Scotland on all government and Crown property and street furniture has carried no lettering, but simply the Crown of Scotland from the Honours of Scotland. A court case, MacCormick v Lord Advocate, contesting the style "Elizabeth II" within Scotland, was decided in 1953 on the grounds that the numbering of monarchs was part of the royal prerogative, and that the plaintiffs had no title to sue the Crown.

To rationalise this usage, it was suggested by Winston Churchill, the Prime Minister of the day, that in future, the higher of the two numerals from the English and Scottish sequences would always be used. This had been the case de facto since the Acts of Union 1707; nine of the thirteen monarchs since the Act had names either never previously used in England or Scotland (Anne, six Georges, and Victoria) or used in both only after the 1603 Union of Crowns (three Charleses), which sidestepped the issue, while the English numbers for the remaining four monarchs' names have consistently been both higher and the ones used (William, two Edwards, and Elizabeth). Under the Churchill rule, if a future British monarch were to use the regnal name Alexander, even though there has never been a King of England of that regnal name, they would be Alexander IV, there having been three Kings Alexander of Scotland (reigning 1107–1124, 1214–1249, and 1249–1286).

==== Ireland ====
As the Lordship of Ireland (1171–1542) and Kingdom of Ireland (1542–1800) were subordinate to the Kingdom of England, the English ordinals were used in Ireland even before the Acts of Union 1800. William III of England and William IV of the United Kingdom were still called "William III" and "William IV" in Ireland, even though neither William I or William II ruled any part of Ireland. Similarly, the various Kings Henry are numbered II–VIII as they are in England even though Henry I of England never ruled any part of Ireland. Elizabeth I of England is referred to in Irish regnal year legal citations as "Elizabeth" rather than "Elizabeth I" because Ireland became a republic before Elizabeth II became queen.

== "The first" ==
In some monarchies it is customary not to use an ordinal when there has been only one holder of that name. For example, Queen Victoria will not be called Victoria I unless there is a Victoria II. This tradition is applied in the United Kingdom, Belgium, Luxembourg, Norway and the Netherlands. It was also applied in most of the former German monarchies and in Hungary.

Other monarchies assign ordinals to monarchs even if they are the only ones of their name. This is a more recent invention and appears to have been done for the first time when Francis I of France issued testoons (silver coins) bearing the legend FRANCISCVS I DE. GR. FRANCORV. REX. This currently is the regular practice in Spain and Monaco (at least for Prince Albert I, as Princess Louise Hippolyte, who reigned 150 years earlier, does not appear to have used an ordinal). It was also applied in Brazil, Greece, Italy, Mexico, and Montenegro. The ordinal for King Juan Carlos I of Spain is used in both Spanish and English, but he is sometimes simply called King Juan Carlos of Spain in English. In Russia, use of "The First" ordinal started with Paul I of Russia. Before him, neither Anna of Russia nor Elizabeth of Russia had the "I" ordinal. In Ethiopia, Emperor Haile Selassie used the "I" ordinal (Ge'ez: ቀዳማዊ, qädamawi) although previous Ethiopian monarchs had not used it, and they are not referred as "the first" unless there were successors of the same name.

In Portugal and Sweden, the practice is not consistent. In Portugal, Kings Joseph, Louis and Charles are usually referred to as "Joseph I", "Louis I" and "Charles I" although there has not yet been any Joseph II, Louis II or Charles II, but Kings Denis, Edward, Sebastian and Henry are usually referred without the ordinal. In Sweden, Sigismund and Adolf Frederick never have ordinals, whereas Frederick I often does.

The Catholic papacy used the ordinal I under Pope John Paul I, but early popes who are the only ones to have reigned under a certain name are not referred to as "the first" (for instance, Peter the Apostle; his immediate successor, Pope Linus, as well as Pope Anacletus, are referred to without an ordinal), but all of them reigned before regnal numbers became a common practice. The most recent, Pope Francis (2013–2025), however expressly declined the use of an ordinal, but his Orthodox counterpart, Patriarch Bartholomew I of Constantinople, uses one, as does Aram I, the catholicos of the Armenian Apostolic Church.

In Austria, Emperors Francis, Ferdinand, Francis Joseph, and Charles all styled themselves as "the first" although all were the only Emperors of Austria with those names. Three of those names were previously the names of Austrian Archdukes (the Archduchy of Austria was a state within the Holy Roman and the Austrian Empires), which makes three of these emperors Francis II, Ferdinand V, and Charles IV in their capacity as Archdukes. Francis Joseph was the first Austrian Archduke of that name.

The use of "The First" ordinal is also common to self-proclaimed ephemeral kings or emperors, such as Napoleon I in France; Jacques I, Henri I and Faustin I in Haiti; Agustín I in Mexico; Zog I in Albania; Bokassa I in the Central African Empire; Boris I in Andorra; Theodore I in Corsica; and "Emperor" Norton I in San Francisco. In those cases, they wanted to emphasize the change of regime they introduced or attempted to introduce.

== Pretenders ==
It is traditional amongst the various strands of monarchism in France to continue to number their pretenders even though they have never reigned. Henri IV (died 1610) Philippe VI (died 1350) and Louis Philippe I (abdicated 1848) were the last reigning kings of their respective names. Henri, Count of Chambord was Legitimist pretender as "Henri V" from 1844 to 1883. Prince Philippe, Count of Paris was "pure" Orléanist pretender as "Louis Philippe II" (1848–1873) and "unionist" (joint Orléanist–Legitimist) pretender as "Philippe VII" (1883–1894) since Legitimists had not recognised Louis Philippe I. There have been later unionist pretenders numbered Henri VI and Henri VII, and a rival Legitimist Henri VI.

Non-consecutive ordinals of reigning monarchs may indicate dynastic claims for non-regnant monarchs. For example, after Louis XVI was executed during the French Revolution, Legitimists consider him to have been succeeded by his young son, whom they called Louis XVII. Although the child died in prison a few years later and never reigned, his uncle, who came to the French throne in the Bourbon Restoration, took the name Louis XVIII in acknowledgement of his dynasty's rights. Similarly, after Emperor Napoleon I's regime collapsed, he abdicated in favour of his four-year-old son, who was proclaimed Napoleon II. The young emperor was deposed only weeks later by Napoleon's European rivals and was never recognized internationally; but when his first cousin Louis Napoleon Bonaparte proclaimed himself Emperor in 1852, he declared himself Napoleon III in recognition of his predecessor.

=== Jacobite usage ===
Following the Glorious Revolution, a line of pretenders descended from the dethroned James VII and II claimed the throne and declared themselves to be James VIII and III, Charles III and Henry IX and I. They numbered themselves separately for Scotland and England because they did not recognise the Acts of Union, which joined the two kingdoms into one in 1707, as valid.

James VII's last legitimate descendant died in 1807, and the claim passed to descendants of his sister Henrietta, Duchess of Orléans. Although none of them has actively claimed the throne, their supporters have assigned them the regnal numbers that they "should have had"; for example, from 1919 to 1955, the claim was held by "Robert I & IV", which was numbered for England and Scotland respectively.

This custom is currently not followed by any other ethnic groups other than the French and British (Jacobites), being unique to them, monarchists from other nations do not usually use royal numbers for the pretenders they support.

== Queens consort ==
While reigning monarchs use ordinals, ordinals are not used for royal female consorts. Thus, while King George V used an ordinal to distinguish him from other kings in the United Kingdoms called George, his wife, Queen Mary, had no ordinal.

The lack of an ordinal in the case of royal consorts complicates the recording of history, as there may be a number of consorts over time with the same name with no way to distinguish between them. For that reason, royal consorts are sometimes after their deaths recorded in history books and encyclopaedias by the use of their premarital name or, if they were from royalty or sovereign nobility, the name of the dynasty or the country. For example, Henry VIII's fifth wife, Catherine Howard (of noble but not sovereign ancestry), is known by her maiden surname, and George V's wife (a descendant of the sovereign ducal house of Württemburg) is commonly known as Mary of Teck (after her father's title) and Edward VII's wife (a daughter of the King of Denmark) is known as Alexandra of Denmark.
