= MacCormick v Lord Advocate =

Scottish law case over regnal number of Elizabeth II

- Court: Inner House of the Court of Session
- Decided: 30 July 1953
- Citations: 1953 SC 396; 1953 SLT 255; [1953] 7 WLUK 166; [1953] CLY 597

Case history
- Appealed from: Outer House of the Court of Session

Court membership
- Judges sitting: Lord President Lord Cooper; Lord Carmont; Lord Russell

Keywords
- Judicial review; Jurisdiction; Queen Elizabeth II

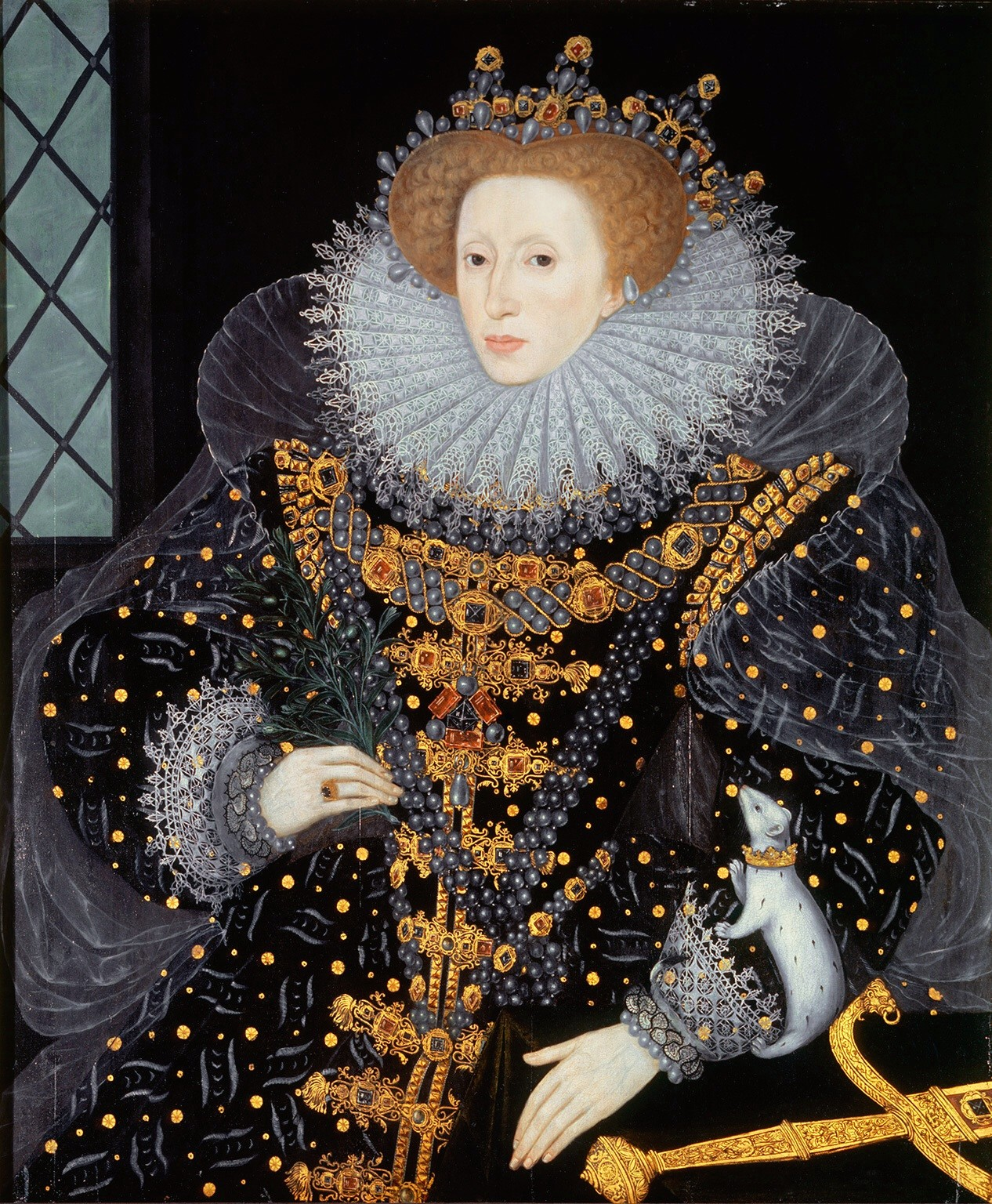
Elizabeth I of England

MacCormick v Lord Advocate 1953 SC 396 was a Scottish constitutional law case and Scottish legal action on whether Queen Elizabeth II was entitled to use the numeral "II" as her regnal number in Scotland, as there had never been an earlier Elizabeth reigning in Scotland.

== Facts ==
John MacCormick (the Rector of the University of Glasgow) and Ian Hamilton (then part of the Glasgow University Scottish Nationalist Association) contested the right of Queen Elizabeth II to style herself 'Elizabeth II' within Scotland. They claimed it was a breach of the Act of Union 1707 between England and Scotland, since Elizabeth I had been Queen of England but not of Scotland. The action was brought against the Crown, which was represented by the Lord Advocate, who is the most senior law officer in Scotland.

== Judgment ==
The petition first came before Lord Guthrie, sitting as Lord Ordinary in the Outer House (the court of first instance in the Court of Session). He dismissed it; this was appealed to the Inner House. The appeal was heard by the Lord President (Lord Cooper of Culross), Lord Carmont, and Lord Russell. There, MacCormick and Hamilton lost their case: it was held that the treaty had no provision concerning the numbering of monarchs—it was part of the royal prerogative, and that they had no title to sue the Crown. The Lord President did give his opinion in a obiter, a non binding opinion separate from the Court’s judgment, that "the principle of unlimited sovereignty of Parliament is a distinctively English principle and has no counterpart in Scottish constitutional law". The case was thus constitutionally interesting as the Lord Advocate "conceded this point by admitting that the Parliament of the United Kingdom 'could not' repeal or alter [certain] 'fundamental and essential' conditions" of the Act of Union. However, the Lord President also held that "there is neither precedent nor authority of any kind for the view that the domestic Courts of either Scotland or England have jurisdiction to determine whether a governmental act of the type here in controversy is or is not conform to the provisions of a Treaty" and "it has not been shown that the Court of Session has authority to entertain the issue sought to be raised".

== Significance ==
The outcome of this case has had continuing relevance, most notably in 1999, when the British Parliament discussed the creation of the Scottish Parliament. It has been discussed in a number of later decisions of the courts, notably Gibson v Lord Advocate 1975 SC 136, and the English case of Jackson v Attorney General, [2005] 3 WLR 733.

Winston Churchill suggested that British sovereigns would use either the English or the Scottish number, whichever was higher.

== See also ==
- Style of the British sovereign
- United Kingdom constitutional law
- Pillar Box War
