= Crown of Scotland =

Crown that was used for coronation of monarchs of Scotland

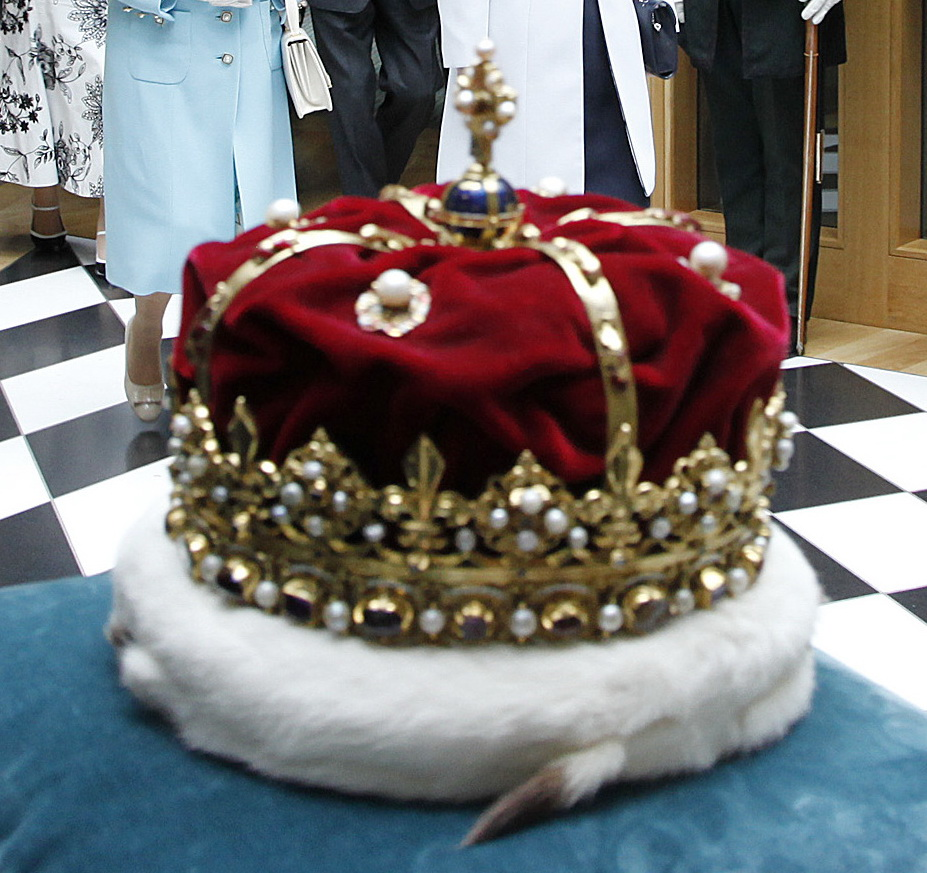

Heraldic depictions

Details
- Country: Scotland
- Made: 1540 (remade from previous version)
- Owner: Charles III in right of the Crown
- Weight: 1.6 kg (3.5 lb)
- Arches: 4
- Material: Scottish gold and silver

The Crown of Scotland (Scots: Croun o Scotland, Scottish Gaelic: Crùn na h-Alba) is the centrepiece of the Honours of Scotland. It is the crown that was used at the coronation of the monarchs of Scotland, and it is the oldest surviving crown in the British Isles and the fifth oldest in Europe.

A crown must have been made during the reign of Robert the Bruce or his son, David II, as David was anointed and crowned, as were all the subsequent Stewart kings. It was probably this new crown that was remodelled into the current crown. Remade in its current form for James V in 1540, the crown was last used in a coronation to crown Charles II in 1651. Until 1707 the crown was present at the opening of each term of the Parliament of Scotland as a symbol of royal authority. The crown has been present at each Opening Ceremony of the Scottish Parliament since 1999.

Made of solid gold and silver, the crown weighs 1.6 kilograms (3 pounds 8 ounces) and is decorated with 69 Scottish freshwater pearls and 43 gemstones. Stylised versions of the crown appear upon the version of the royal coat of arms of the United Kingdom used in Scotland and the Scottish Royal Cypher of Charles III.

The Crown of Scotland is kept on public display in the Crown Room at Edinburgh Castle.

== Description ==
The base of the Crown of Scotland is a circlet of solid gold set with 22 large pearls and the twenty gemstones from the old crown. These pearls and gemstones are set within frames with leaf-shaped sides and silver and enamel upper and lower sections. On the top edge of the circlet are forty gold half circles, with each half circle topped by an alternating sequence of twenty pearls, ten gold fleurs-de-lis, and ten gold crosses fleury. Each cross fleury features four pearls surrounding a central gemstone.

The circlet supports the four solid gold arches from the old crown, each of which is decorated with gold and red-enamelled oak leaves. The arches are topped by a gold monde, which is enamelled blue and covered with small gold stars, and topped by a gold cross pattée, set off with black enamel, eight pearls and a large amethyst. James V's royal cypher 'JR5' appears on the lower arm of the cross on top of the crown, enamelled in black. The crown has a red velvet bonnet, with four enamelled gold ornaments adorned with a pearl attached to it between the four arches.

== History ==
=== Origins ===
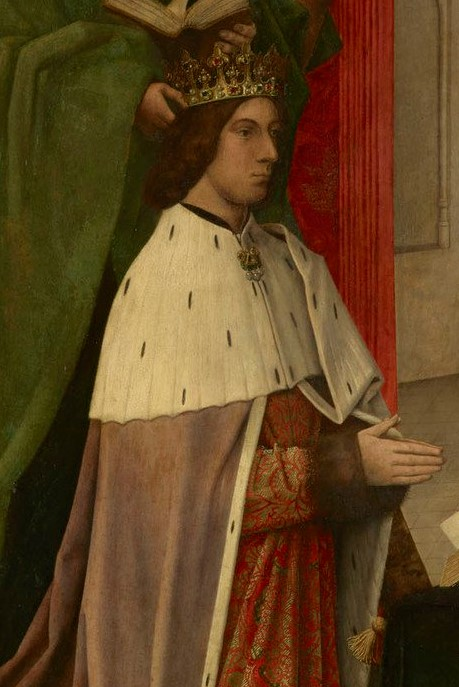
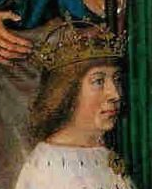
James III depicted wearing the "open" style Crown of Scotland in the Trinity Altarpiece by Hugo van der Goes (c. 1478–1482) (left), and James IV depicted wearing the "imperial" style Crown of Scotland in the Hours of James IV of Scotland (c. 1503) (right)

The earliest known depiction of a Scottish monarch wearing a crown is from the reign of Edgar (1097–1107), who was depicted on his Great Seal wearing a crown and holding a sceptre and sword. The first written reference to the Crown of Scotland dates from the abdication of John Balliol in 1296, when the Scottish regalia was described as consisting of a sceptre, sword, crown and ring. The crown and other regalia were seized by the army of Edward I of England in 1296 and taken to England.

Following his seizure of the throne in 1306, Robert the Bruce was crowned at Scone Abbey with a newly made circlet of gold. The circlet was captured by the English after the Battle of Methven and taken to England and, although it has been claimed that the present Crown of Scotland incorporates the original circlet, there is no record of the circlet ever having been returned to Scotland and no clear evidence for this claim. A new crown must have been made during the reign of Robert the Bruce or his son, David II, as David was anointed and crowned, as were all the subsequent Stewart kings, and it was probably this new crown that was remodelled into the current crown.

From the reign of Edgar until the reign of James III (1460–1488) the Crown of Scotland was depicted as a circlet or "open" crown surmounted by fleurs de lis around its rim. The first evidence of a change in the form of the crown appears late in the reign of James III, with the king depicted on a silver coin of 1484 wearing an imperial or "closed" crown with four arches surmounted by a monde and cross. The earliest illustration of the Crown of Scotland as an imperial crown dates from 1503 when James IV was depicted wearing an imperial crown in the Book of Hours commissioned for his marriage to Margaret Tudor. The accuracy of this depiction of the crown has been questioned, as the artist lived in County of Flanders and would never have seen the crown. A new crown was made for Margaret Tudor by John Currour. The king's crown was repaired by Matthew Auchinleck in 1503 and ermine was added to its bonnet in March 1504, suggesting it may have been made in imperial form.

The Crown of Scotland assumed the form of an imperial crown when it was remodelled in August 1532. The existing crown was delicate and had been repaired in May 1532, and would be again the following year by Adam Leys. In October 1533, James Hamilton of Finnart was paid for three ounces of gold used to repair the crown.

=== Remodelled ===
In January 1540, James V commissioned the royal goldsmith, John Mosman, to remodel the crown. Mosman dismantled the old crown, removing the four arches and all the gemstones and pearls. The circlet of the old crown was melted down, and Mosman added 41 ounces of Scottish gold mined at Leadhills in Lanarkshire. Mosman created a new circlet and decorated it with the gemstones and pearls from the old crown, added the four arches, the monde and cross. James V ordered a purple and ermine bonnet from tailor Thomas Arthur of Edinburgh to fit inside the crown. James VII ordered the colour of the bonnet be changed to red in 1685. The bonnet has been replaced several times, and the present bonnet was made in 1993.

=== 16th and 17th centuries ===
The re-modelled crown was first worn by James V in February 1540 to the coronation at Holyrood Abbey of his second wife, Mary of Guise, as queen consort. It was subsequently used in the coronations of the infant monarchs Mary, Queen of Scots, in 1543 and James VI in 1567. In the absence of a resident Scottish monarch following the Union of the Crowns in 1603, the Honours of Scotland were carried to sittings of the Parliament of Scotland in Edinburgh to symbolise the monarch's presence and the royal assent to legislation.

The crown was examined at the royal mint in July 1621 after the death of Gideon Murray, who was the keeper of the Honours as Treasurer-Depute. It was found to be good order and the precious stones were listed. By this time, three empty triangular settings for stones were filled with blue enamel as a substitute.

The crown was used at the coronation of Charles I at the Holyrood Abbey in 1633, and of Charles II at Scone parish church in 1651. The subsequent monarchs of Scotland only took the Scottish coronation oath, and were never crowned in Scotland. During the Wars of the Three Kingdoms, having already destroyed the English Crown Jewels, Oliver Cromwell sought to destroy the Scottish Regalia. However, the Honours of Scotland were secretly buried at Dunnottar Castle, Aberdeenshire, until Charles II was restored in 1660.

=== 18th and 19th centuries ===
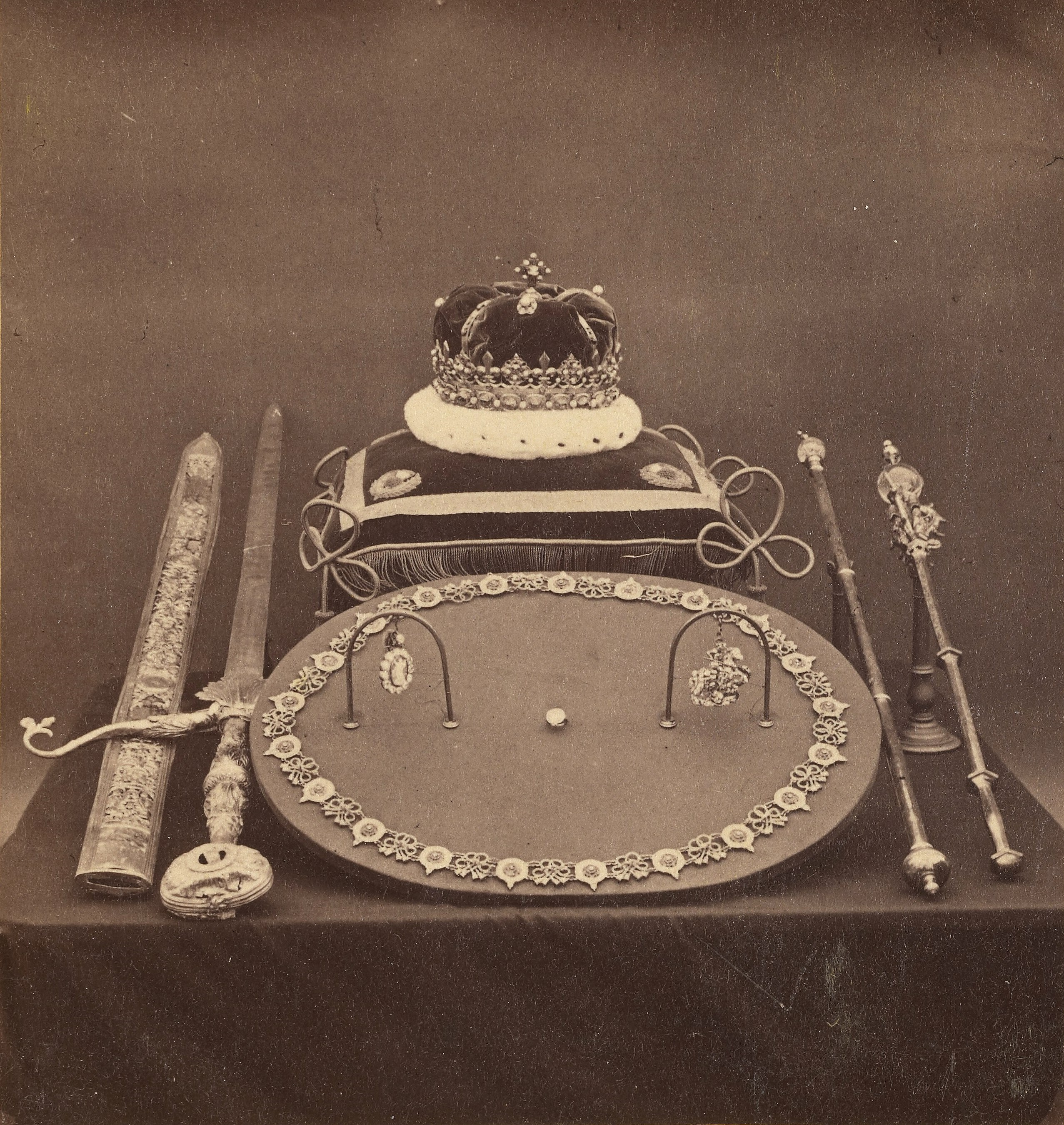
The Honours of Scotland, 1860s

Following the Act of Union of 1707, which united the Kingdom of Scotland and the Kingdom of England to form the Kingdom of Great Britain, and having no ceremonial role to play in the proceedings of the new Parliament of Great Britain in London, the Honours of Scotland were locked away in Edinburgh Castle. There they remained all but forgotten in a chest until 1818, when a group of people including Sir Walter Scott set out to find them.

Since 1819, they have been on display in the Crown Room of Edinburgh Castle, from where they are removed only for state occasions. The first such occasion was in 1822 when presented to George IV at the Palace of Holyroodhouse during his visit to Edinburgh – the first visit to Scotland by a reigning monarch since Charles II in 1651.

=== 20th and 21st centuries ===
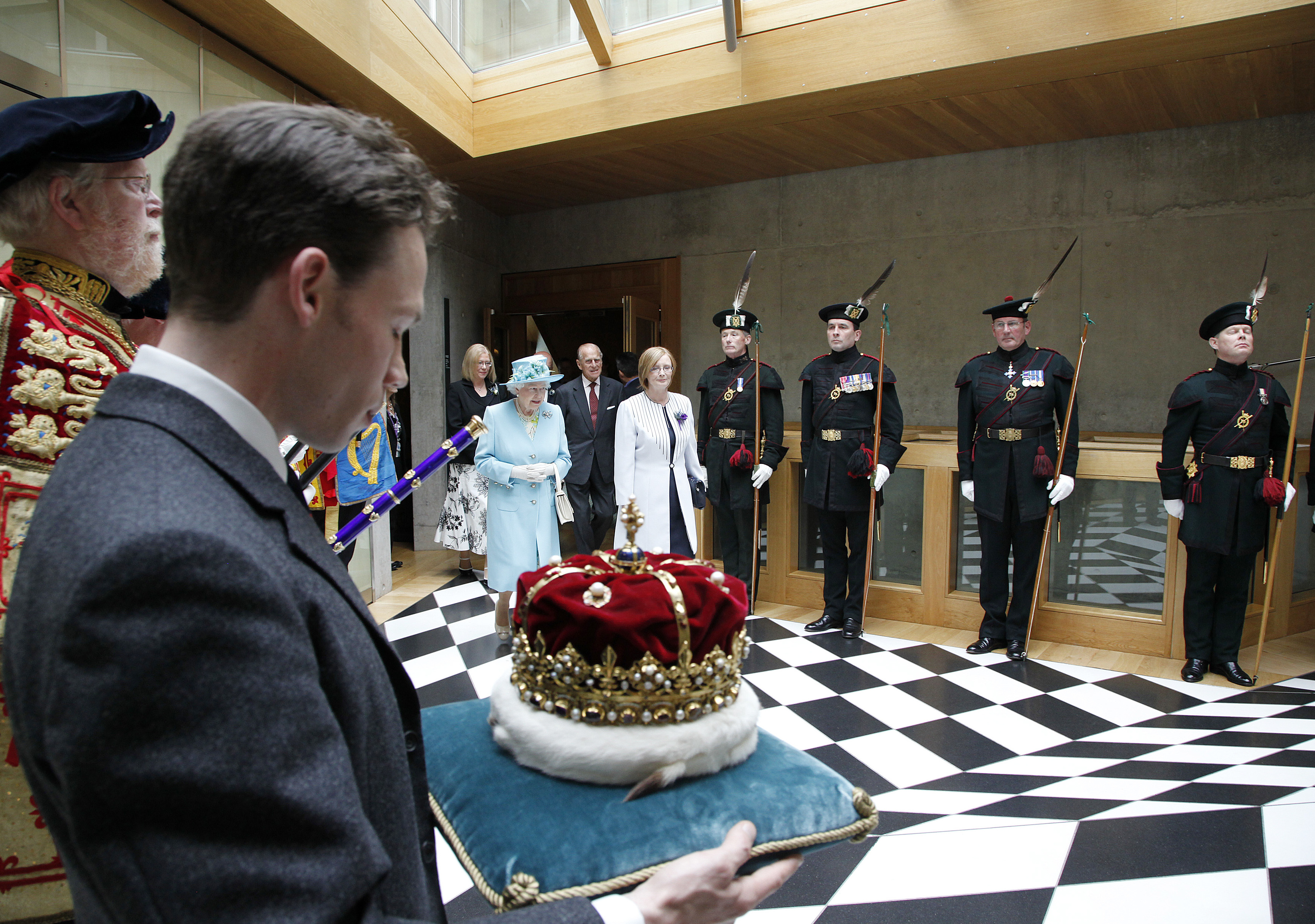
The crown, borne by the Duke of Hamilton, at the Opening Ceremony of the Scottish Parliament in July 2011

On 24 June 1953, following her coronation at Westminster Abbey, the Crown of Scotland was carried before Elizabeth II in a procession from the Palace of Holyroodhouse to St Giles' Cathedral, Edinburgh, where the Honours of Scotland were presented to the monarch during a National Service of Thanksgiving.

The Crown of Scotland has been present at the royal opening ceremonies of the modern Scottish Parliament, including the first in 1999, and the official opening of the new Scottish Parliament Building at Holyrood in 2004. On such occasions the crown, carried by the Duke of Hamilton, the hereditary bearer of the Crown of Scotland, immediately precedes the monarch in the custom of the opening ceremonial procession of the ancient Parliament of Scotland known as the Riding of Parliament.

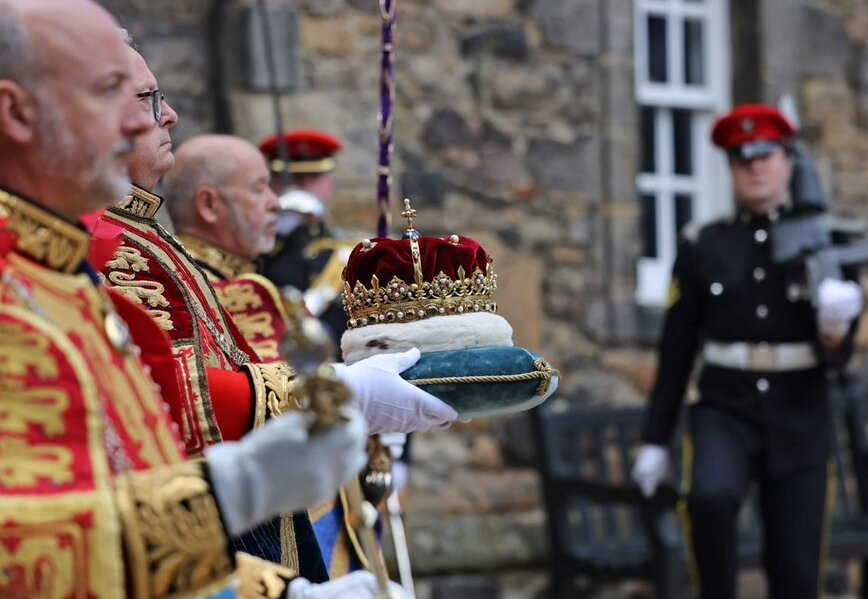
The Crown of Scotland in 2023

The Crown of Scotland surmounted the Scottish version of the Royal Standard of the United Kingdom which covered the coffin of Elizabeth II as she lay-at-rest in St Giles' Cathedral from 12 to 13 September 2022. On 5 July 2023, the Crown, the Sceptre and the Elizabeth Sword, the newest addition to the Honours of Scotland, were presented to Charles III at a national service of thanksgiving at St Giles' Cathedral.

== Use as a symbol ==
The Royal Arms of the United Kingdom used in Scotland, with the Crown of Scotland

As well as appearing in the Royal coat of arms of the UK used in Scotland, the crown appears in the version of the UK royal arms used by the Scotland Office, and it also appeared in the arms used by the former Scottish Executive.

Stylised versions of the crown appear upon Scottish version of the Royal Cypher of Charles III and upon the badges of the Royal Regiment of Scotland, The Royal British Legion Scotland, the Scottish Ambulance Service, Police Scotland and, (as part of the crest of the Royal Arms), upon the logos of the Crown Office and Procurator Fiscal Service, RCAHMS, and General Register Office for Scotland.

Use of the crown for commercial purposes is restricted in the UK (and in countries which are party to the Paris Convention) under the Trade Marks Act 1994, and its use is governed by the Lord Chamberlain's Office.

A version of the crown is used upon Royal Mail premises, vehicles and Scottish pillar, lamp and wall boxes, and a metal insert plate showing the Crown of Scotland also appears on model K6 red telephone boxes in Scotland.

From 1927 until its abolition in 1975, the arms of Kincardineshire County Council featured the crown, together with the sword and sceptre, above an artist's rendering of Dunnottar Castle, to mark the county's status as the 17th-century hiding place of the Honours of Scotland during the Wars of the Three Kingdoms.

The Crown of Scotland also appears on maritime flags, including the Blue Ensign of vessels belonging to Marine Scotland (Compliance Division), and upon the burgees of certain royal yacht clubs in Scotland including, for example, that of the Royal Scottish Motor Yacht Club.

From 1968 to 2008, the reverse of the Five pence coin, minted for circulation throughout the United Kingdom, featured the Royal Badge of Scotland – a thistle surmounted by the Crown of Scotland.

The crown, as a component of the Royal Badge of Scotland ('A Thistle Royally Crowned'), appeared on a 'Regional' series of pre-decimal definitive Royal Mail stamps from 1958 to 1970.

In 2003 a new crown was made for the Lord Lyon King of Arms, modelled on the Crown of Scotland. This crown has removable arches (like one of the late Queen Mother's crowns) which will be removed at coronations to avoid any hint of lèse-majesté.

The coat of arms of Nova Scotia, issued in 1625, includes a unicorn wearing the crown of Scotland as the dexter supporter to symbolise the province's Scottish colonial history. The arms fell into disuse by the mid-19th century, although was later reinstated in 1929.

== Gallery ==
The Scottish Royal Cypher of Charles III

Royal coat of arms of the United Kingdom used in Scotland by the British Government, (Scotland Office), rendered in full colour. The Crown of Scotland surmounts the escutcheon and both supporters.

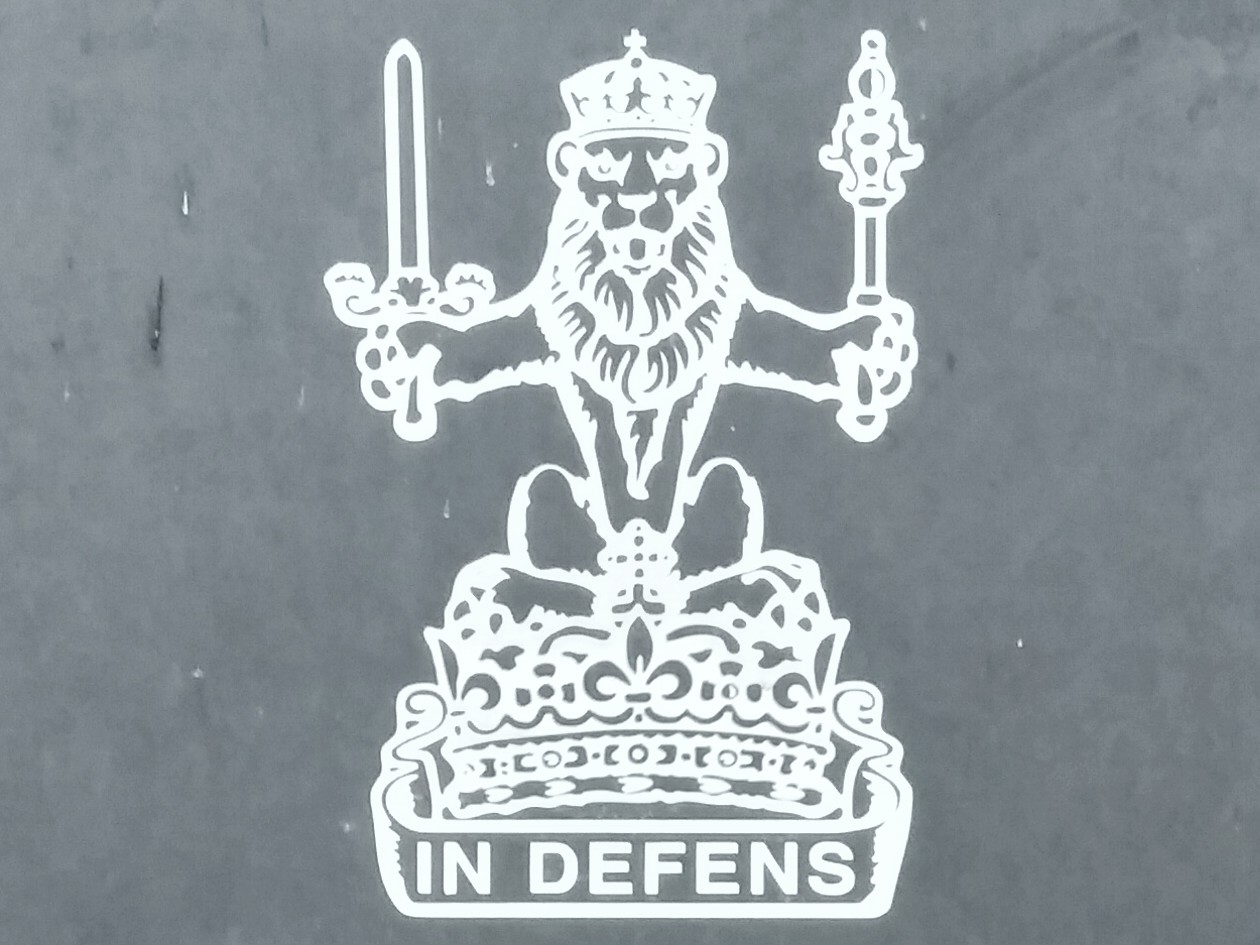
Crest of the (historic) Royal Arms of Scotland and of the Royal Arms of the UK used in Scotland; the lion of the King of Scots atop the Crown of Scotland, bearing the Honours of Scotland. Motto: IN DEFENS

Marine Scotland's ensign; A Blue Ensign defaced by an anchor and chain, accompanied by silver letters SF (Scottish Fisheries), within a thistle wreath and surmounted by the Crown of Scotland.

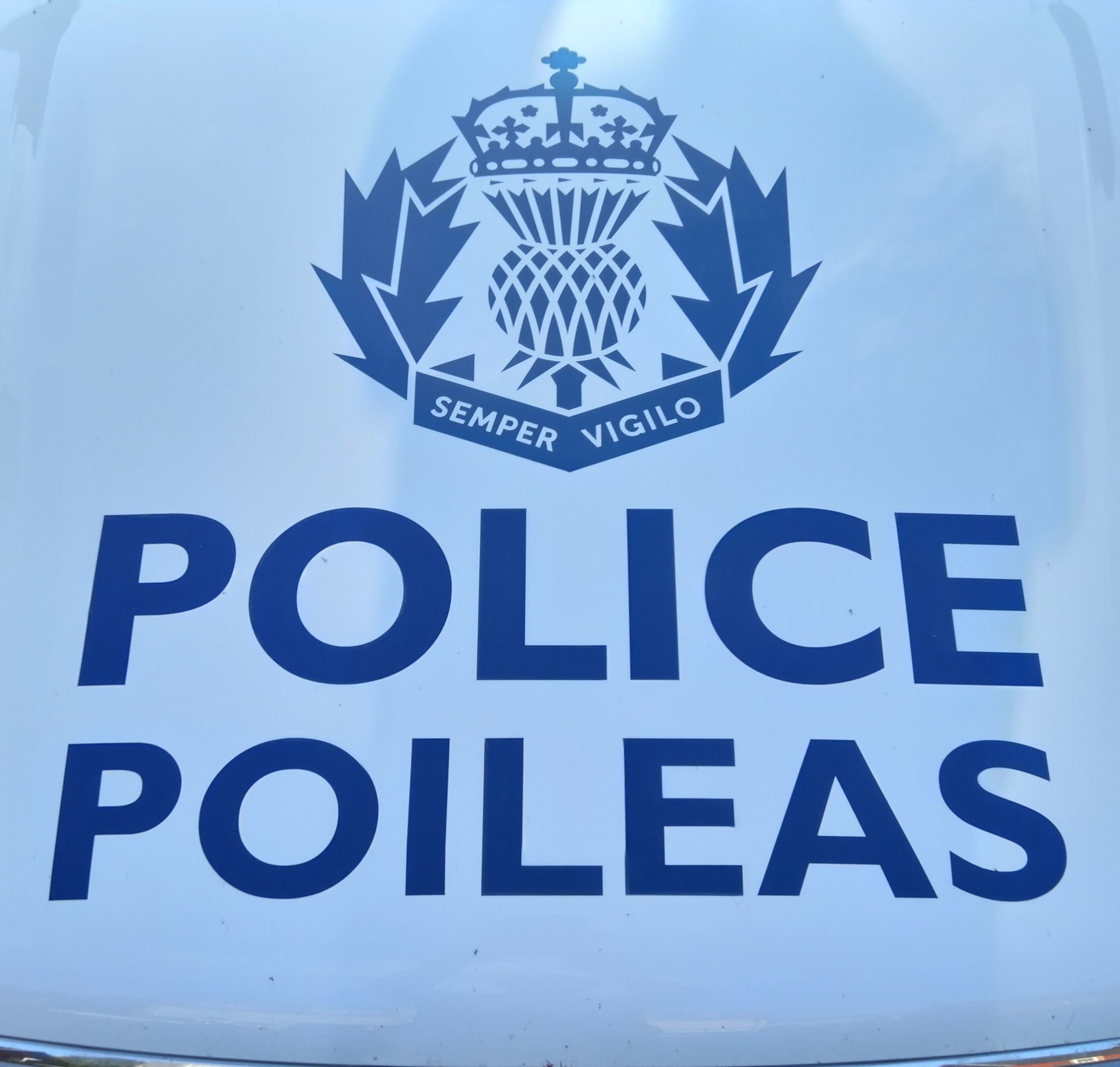
Police Scotland vehicle decal showing a stylised version of the Royal Badge of Scotland: A thistle surmounted by the Crown of Scotland

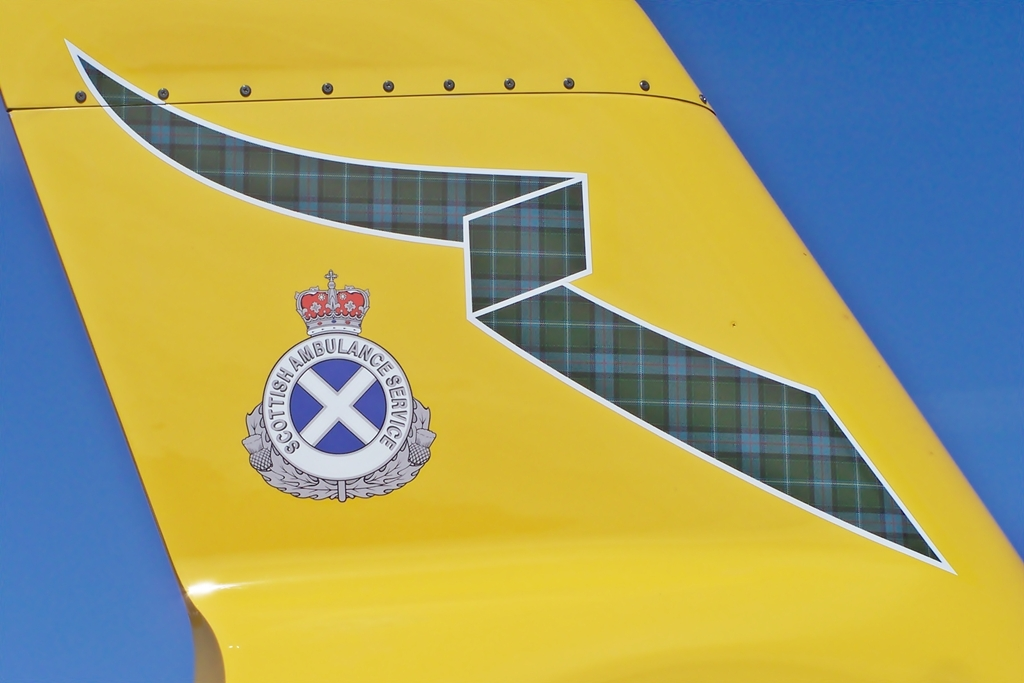
The Crown of Scotland is incorporated into the badge of the Scottish Ambulance Service, shown here on the tail of a Eurocopter EC135.

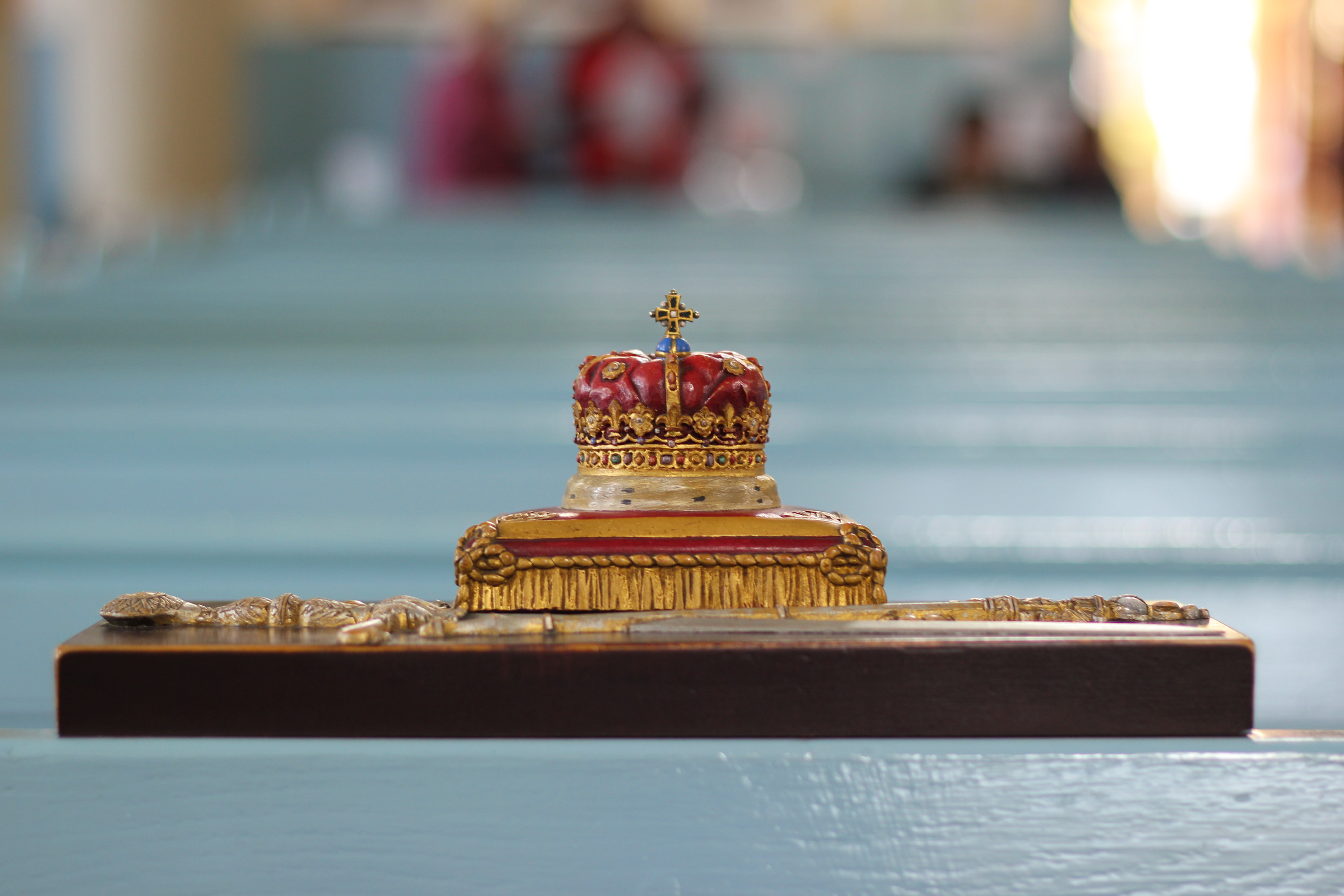
Carved version of the Honours of Scotland by which the Church of Scotland denotes the Royal Pew at the Kirk of the Canongate, Edinburgh.

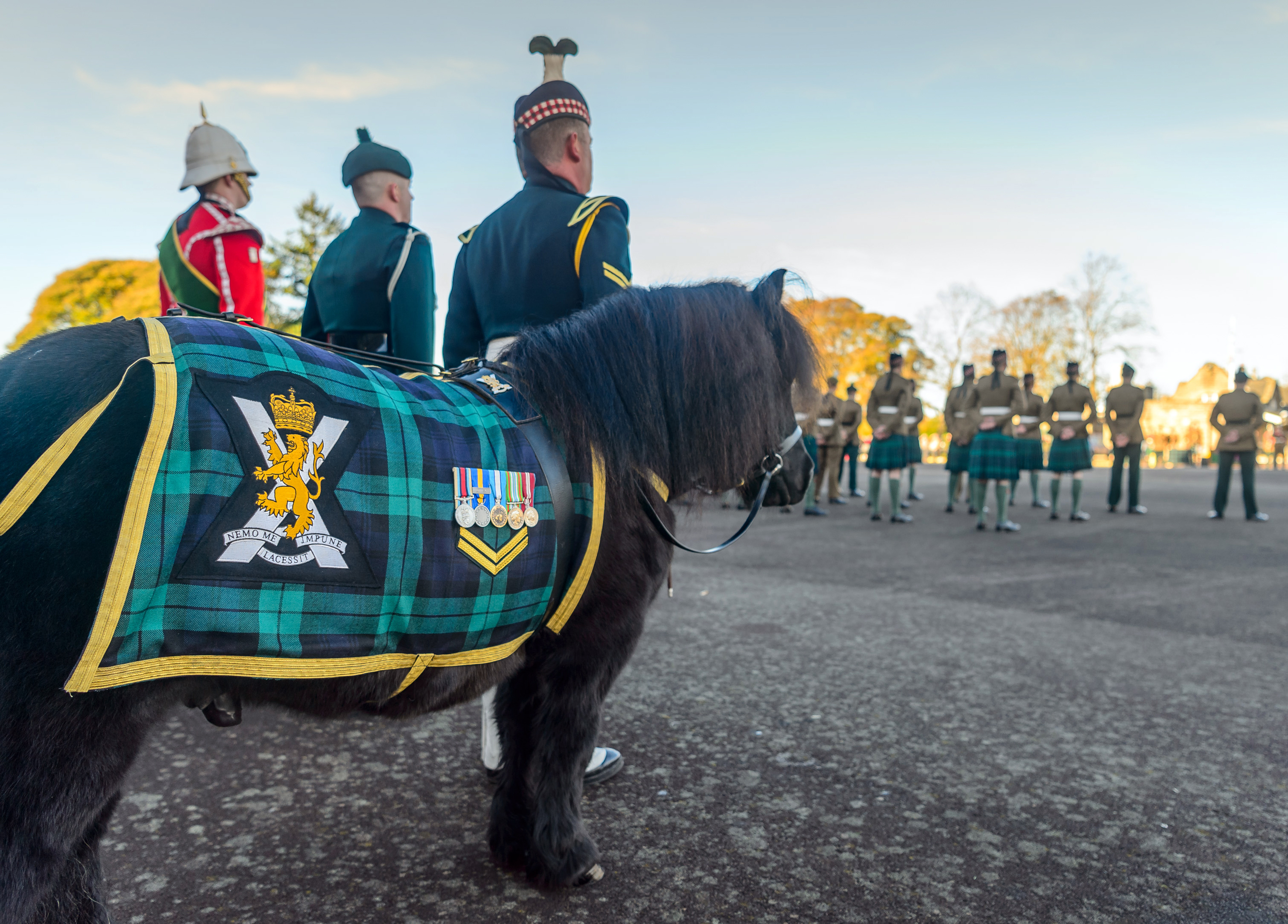
The Royal Regiment of Scotland includes the Crown of Scotland in its badge, shown here on the blanket of the regiment's Shetland Pony mascot.

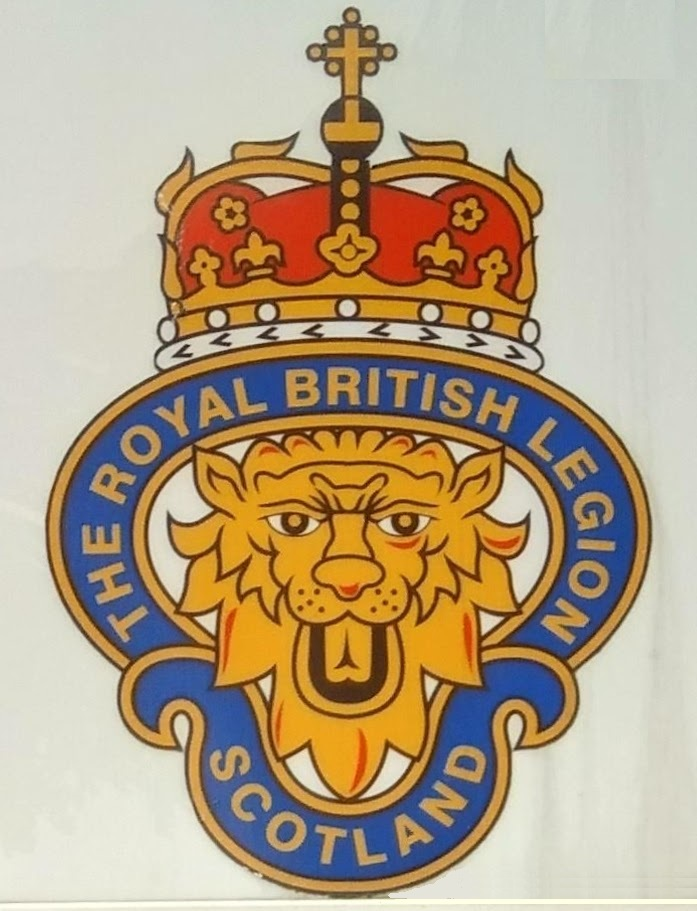
The badge of the Royal British Legion Scotland showing the Crown of Scotland

The dexter supporter of the coat of arms of Nova Scotia, the unicorn, is crowned with the crown of Scotland.
Royal Mail

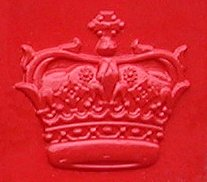
A representation of the Crown of Scotland found on cast iron Royal Mail post boxes in Scotland

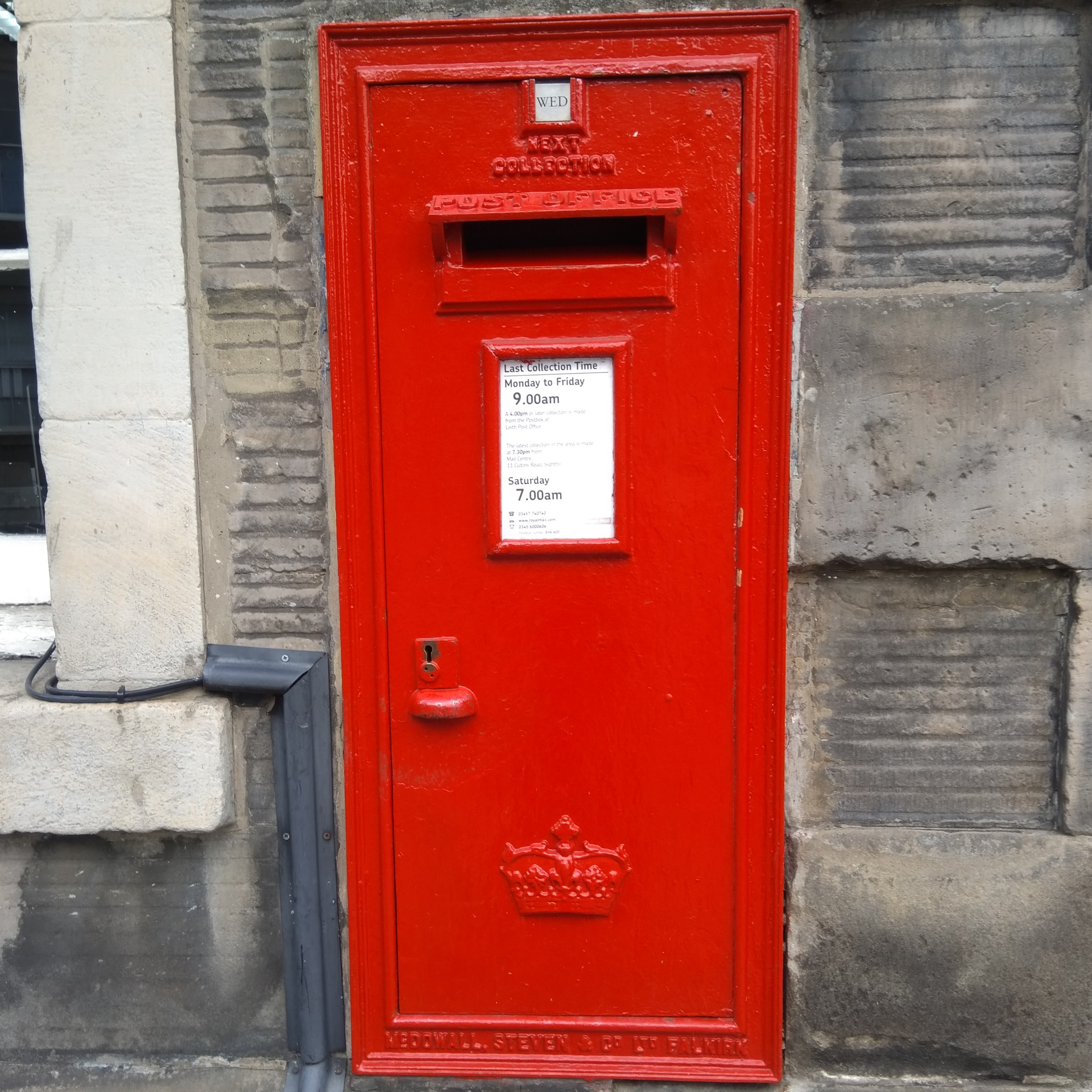
Elizabeth II era Royal Mail wall box in Edinburgh, showing the Crown of Scotland

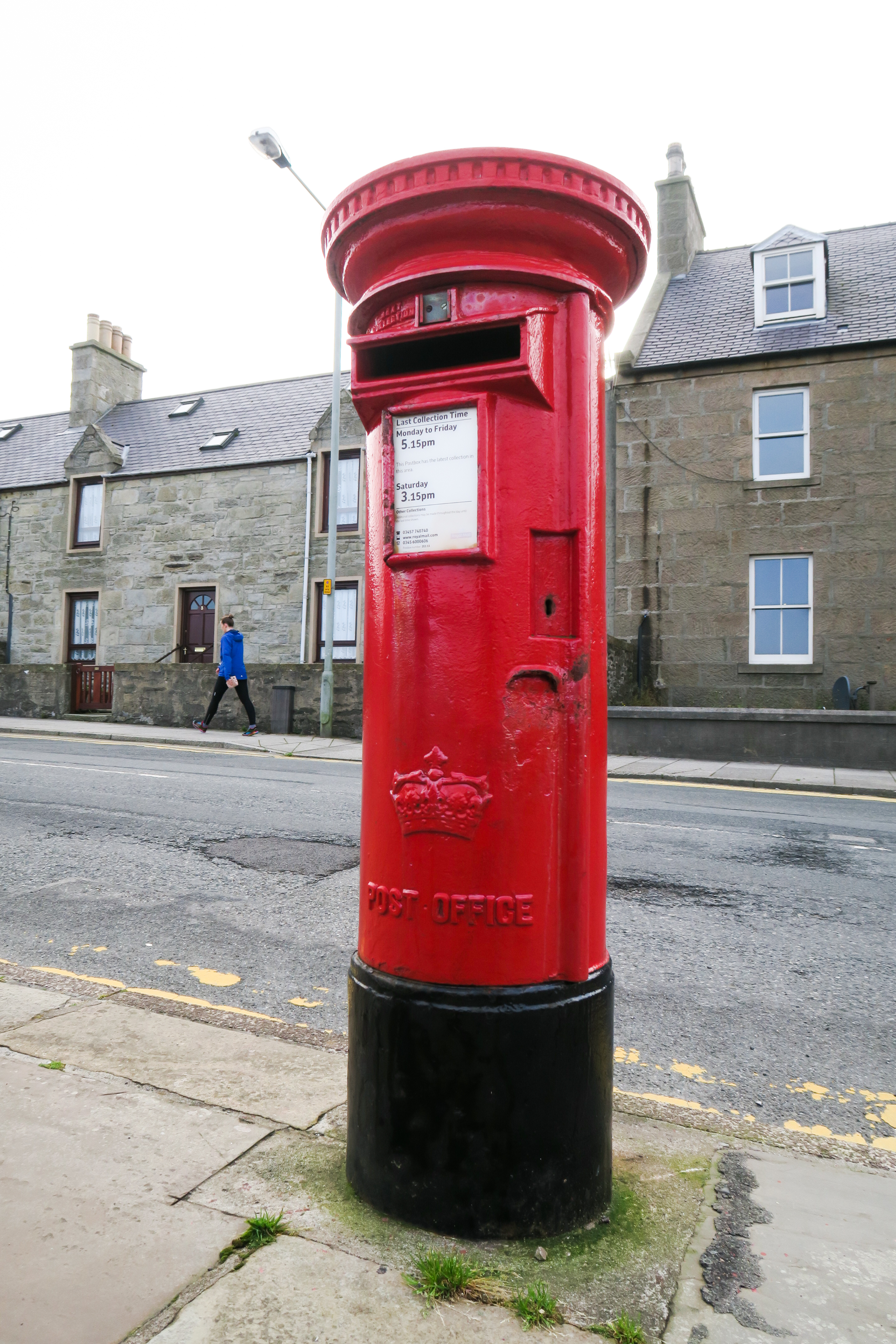
Pillar box in Lerwick, Shetland, showing the Crown of Scotland

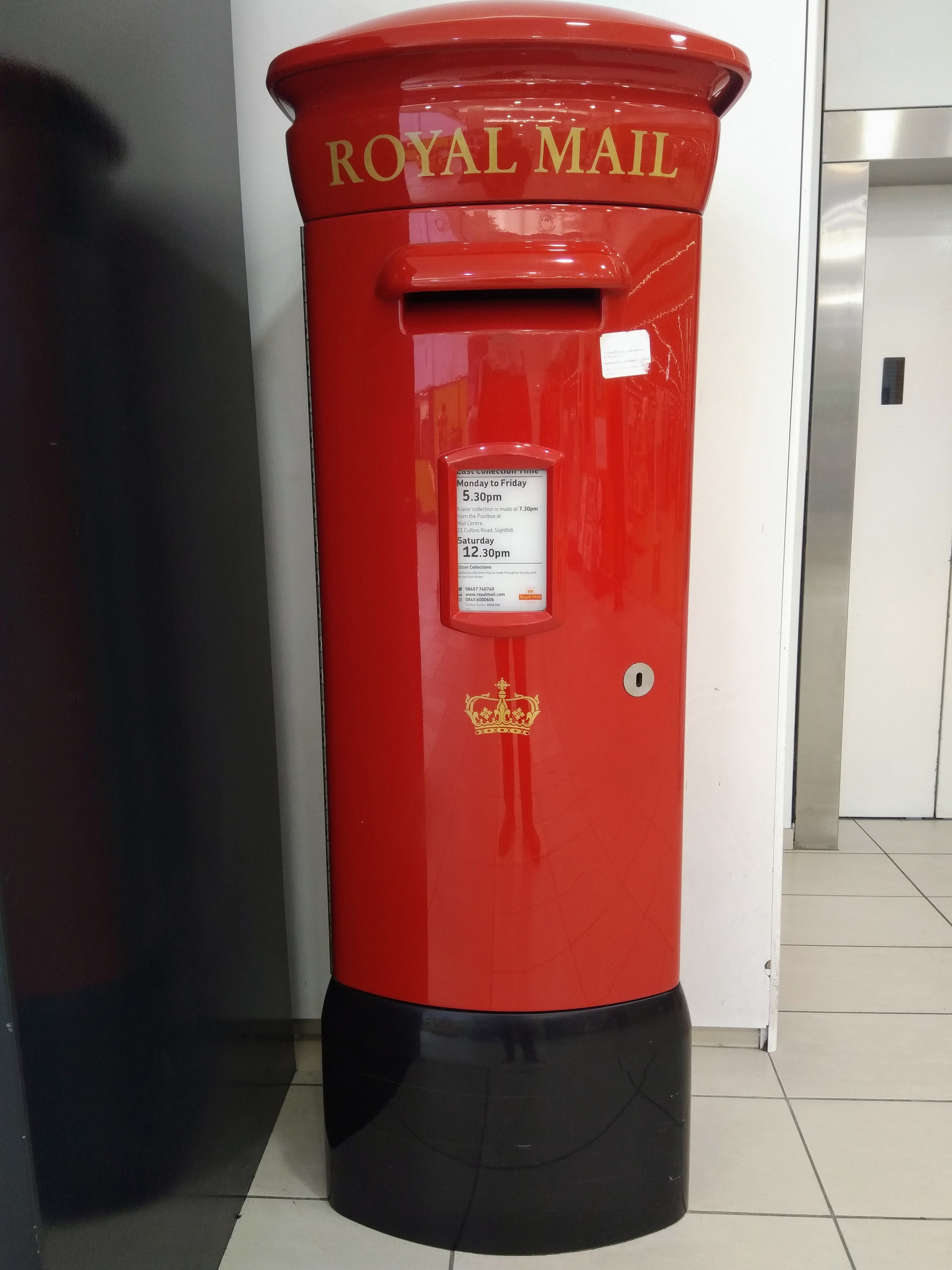
Glass-fibre type PB58 pillar box in Edinburgh, displaying a decal showing a simplified version of the Crown of Scotland

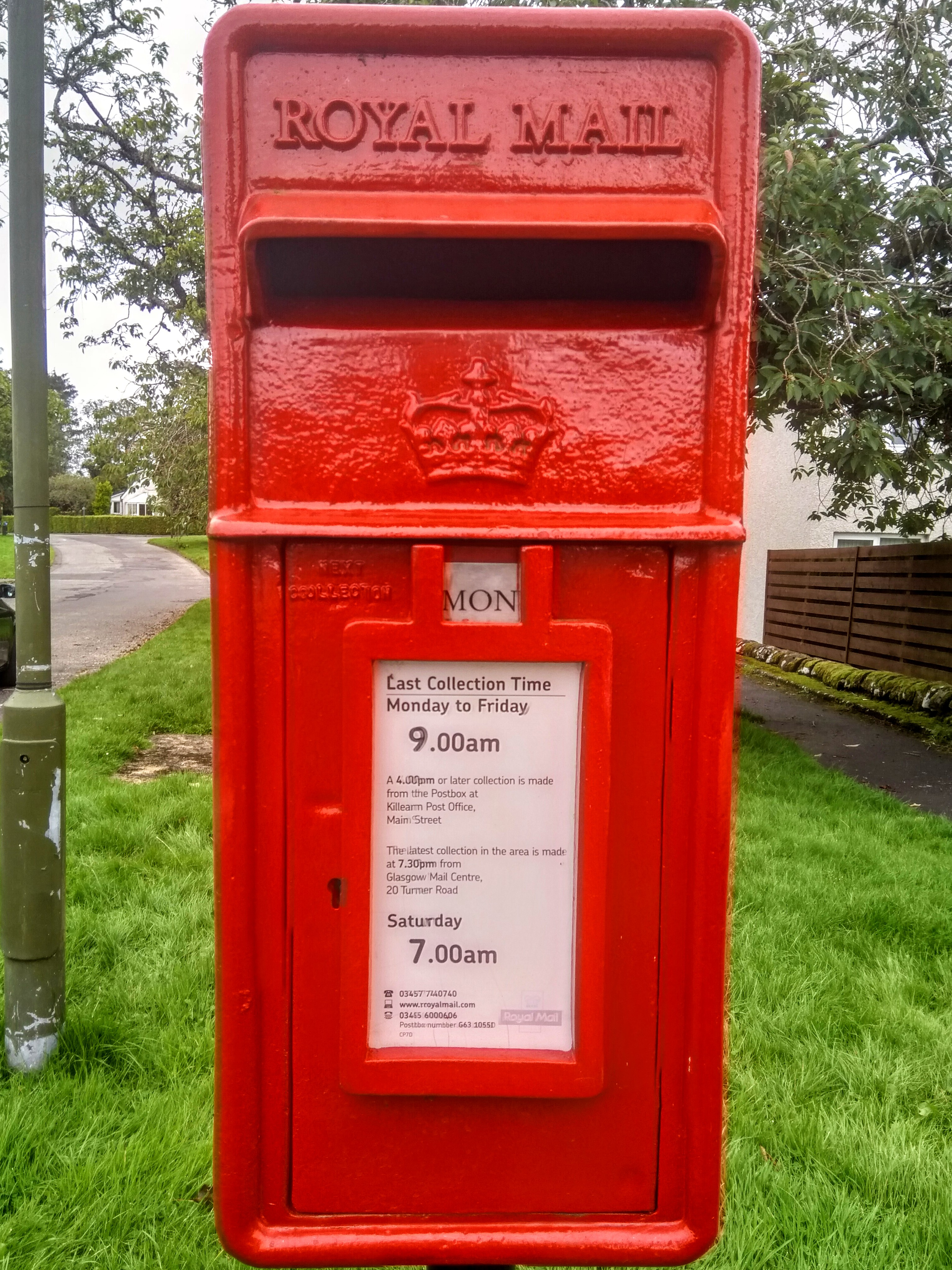
Post mounted Royal Mail lamp box in Killearn, Stirlingshire. In Scotland, the Crown of Scotland appears without the EIIR element of the Cypher.

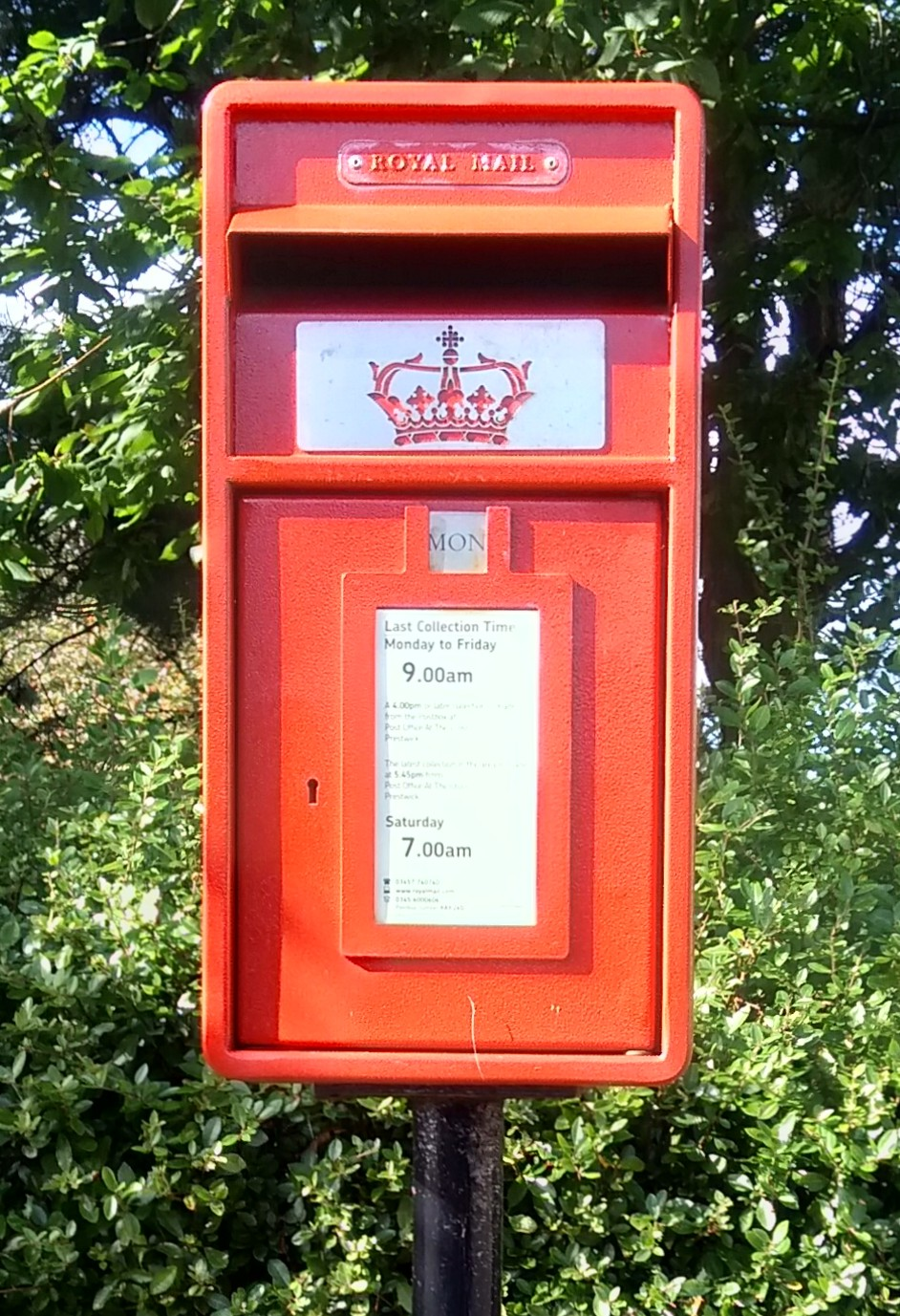
Royal Mail lamp box type LB3426 with the Crown of Scotland on a steel plate (Prestwick, Scotland)

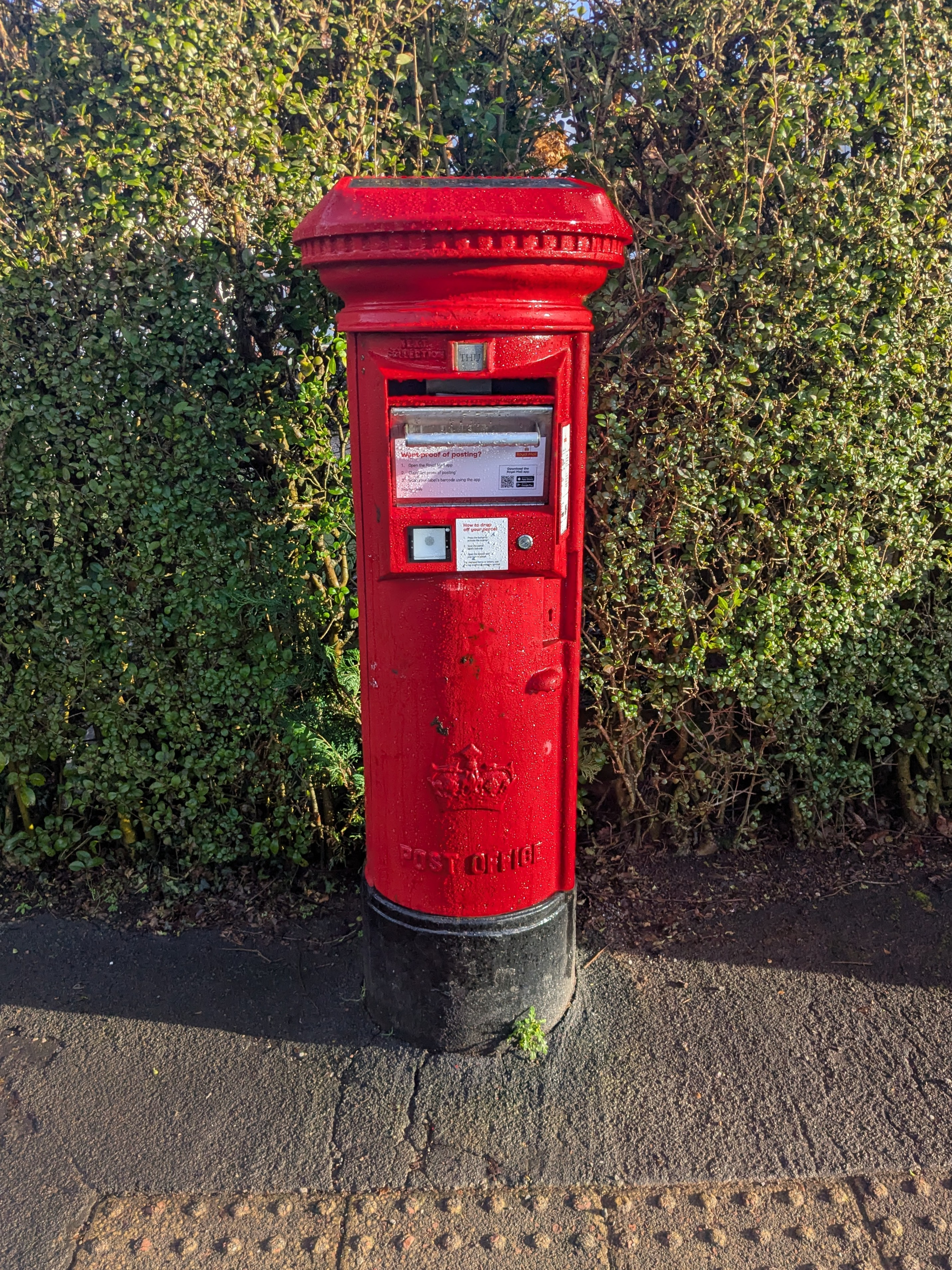
Royal Mail Solar-powered Parcel Postbox in Drymen, Stirlingshire, showing the Crown of Scotland

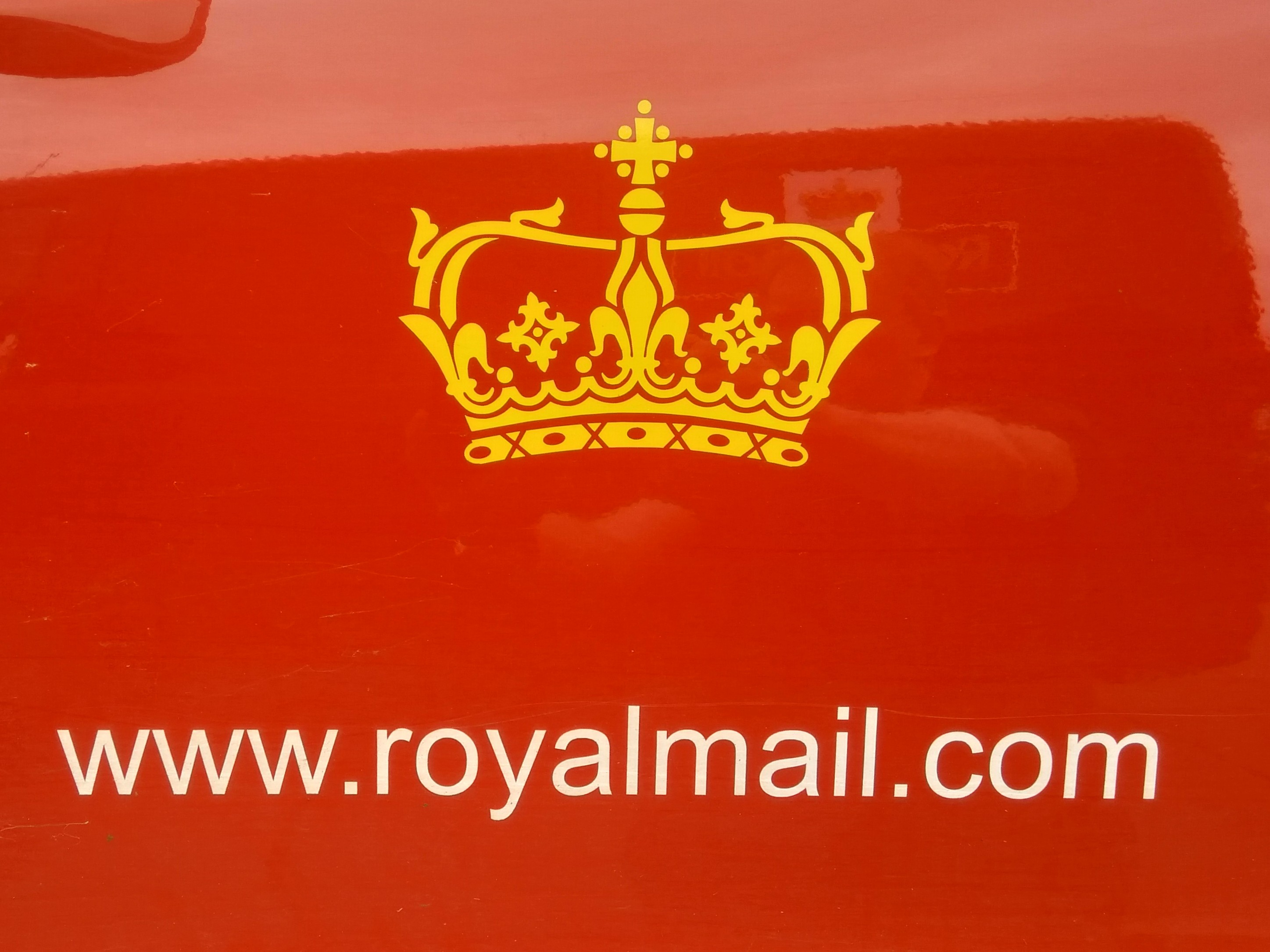
Royal Mail vehicle logo (side door) used in Scotland showing a simplified version of the Crown of Scotland (a convention adopted after the 1953 Coronation prevents EIIR being used in Scotland)

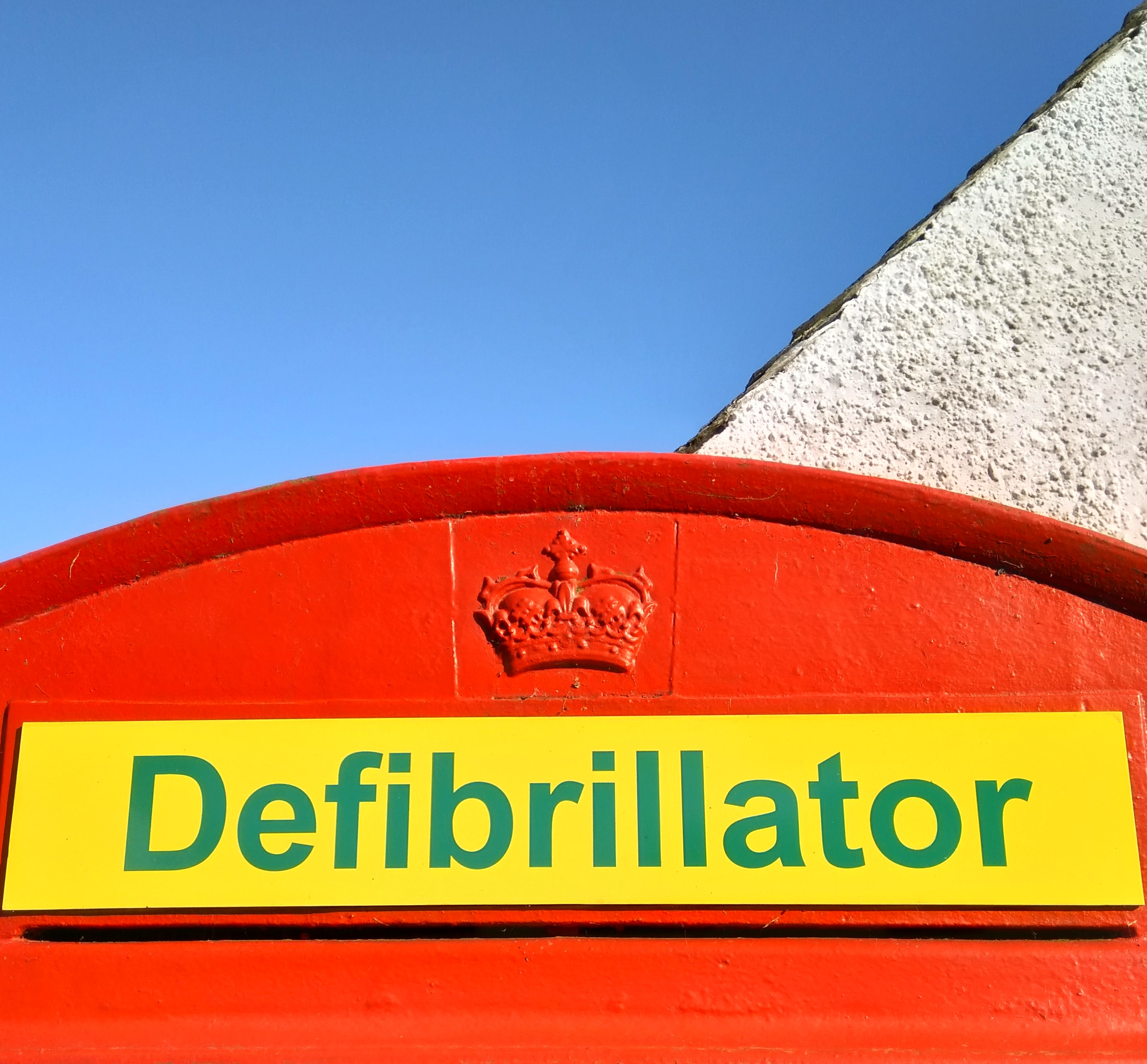
Red telephone box (Model K6), converted to house a defibrillator, showing the Crown of Scotland on an insert plate (St Edward's Crown insert plates appear on K6 models outwith Scotland.)

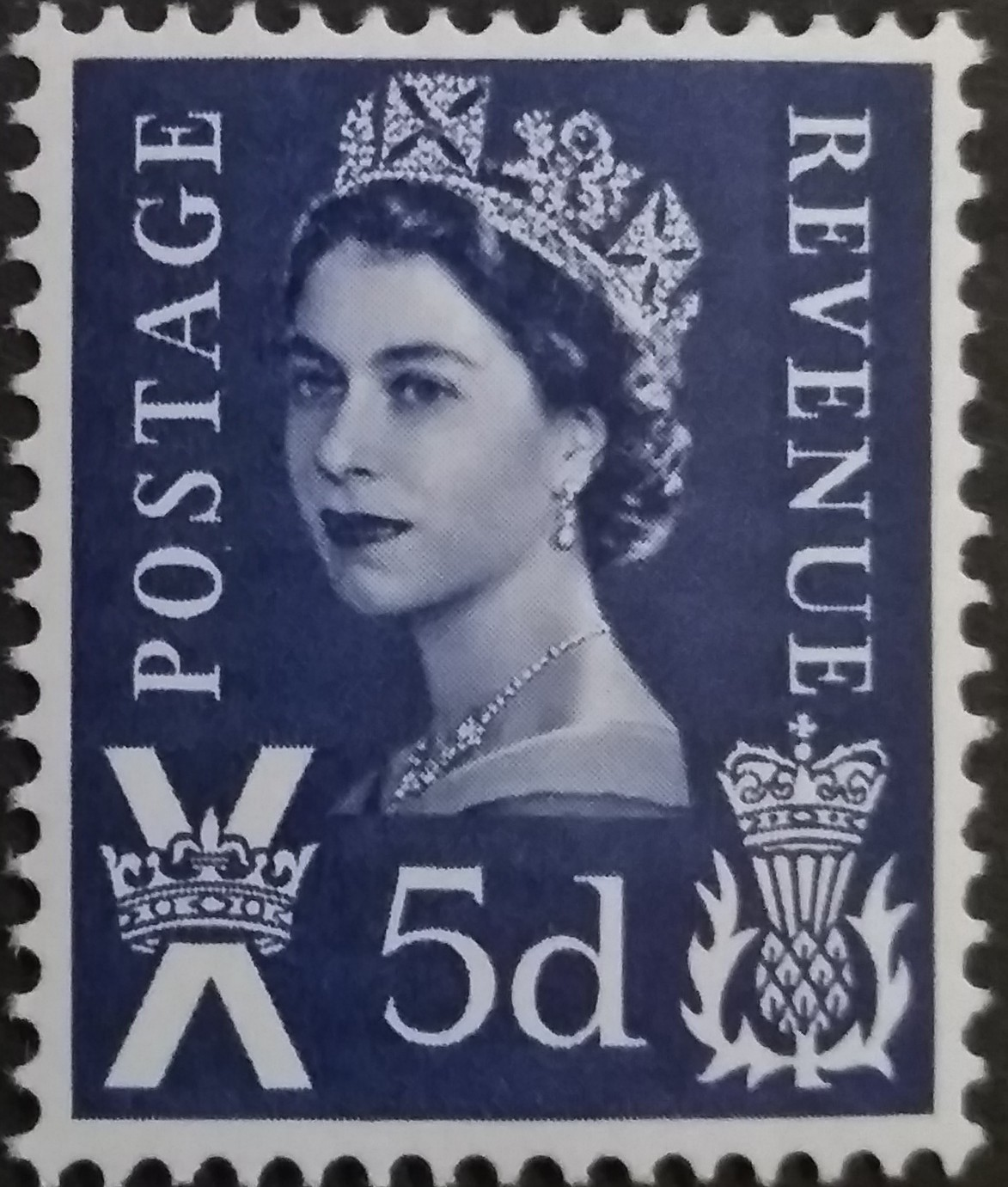
1958-1970 Pre-decimal definitive Royal Mail stamp, featuring the Crown of Scotland in the Royal Badge of Scotland: A Thistle Royally Crowned

== See also ==
- Pillar Box War
- Honours of Scotland
