= Elizabeth Sword =

Scottish ceremonial state sword

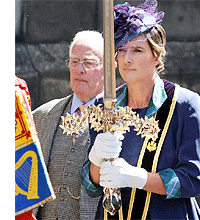
The Elizabeth Sword carried by Dame Katherine Grainger DBE

The Elizabeth Sword is a ceremonial state sword kept in Edinburgh Castle. It is used on ceremonial occasions in place of the Sword of State, which is part of the Honours of Scotland (informally the Scottish Crown Jewels), that Scottish monarchs used at their coronation. The Elizabeth Sword, along with the Crown of Scotland and the Sceptre, were presented to King Charles III in 2023. The sword, named after Queen Elizabeth II, was commissioned in 2022.

== History ==
The kings of Scotland used a sword given by Pope Julius II to King James IV of Scotland in 1507 as the Sword of State (also referred to as the Papal Sword), used for coronations and ceremonial occasions. The sword acted in this role through the union of the crowns and has been used at ceremonial occasions since. However, in 2022 it was decided that the sword was too fragile to continue to be used.

At the behest of the Lord Lyon King of Arms, a new ceremonial sword was commissioned. The concept was approved by the Scottish Government following the death of Queen Elizabeth II. It was designed by Mark D. Dennis, former Ormond Pursuivant of Arms, based upon the traditional Scottish landscape. The sword cost £22,000 to make. The Honours, including the sword, were presented to King Charles III in July 2023 at a national service of thanksgiving at St Giles Cathedral marking his coronation, then returned to Historic Environment Scotland, who usually keep them on display in the Crown Room of Edinburgh Castle.

== Design ==
The sword's pommel is made of Lewisian gneiss from Iona, and the hilt of oak sourced from Perthshire. The hilt and the crossguard are a swirling thistle. The blade is engraved with the royal motto of Scotland: "In my defens God me defend" on one side, and the other side with the motto of the Order of the Thistle: "Nemo me impune lacessit" (none attack me unpunished).
