= Presentation of the Honours of Scotland to Charles III =

2023 Scottish royal ceremony

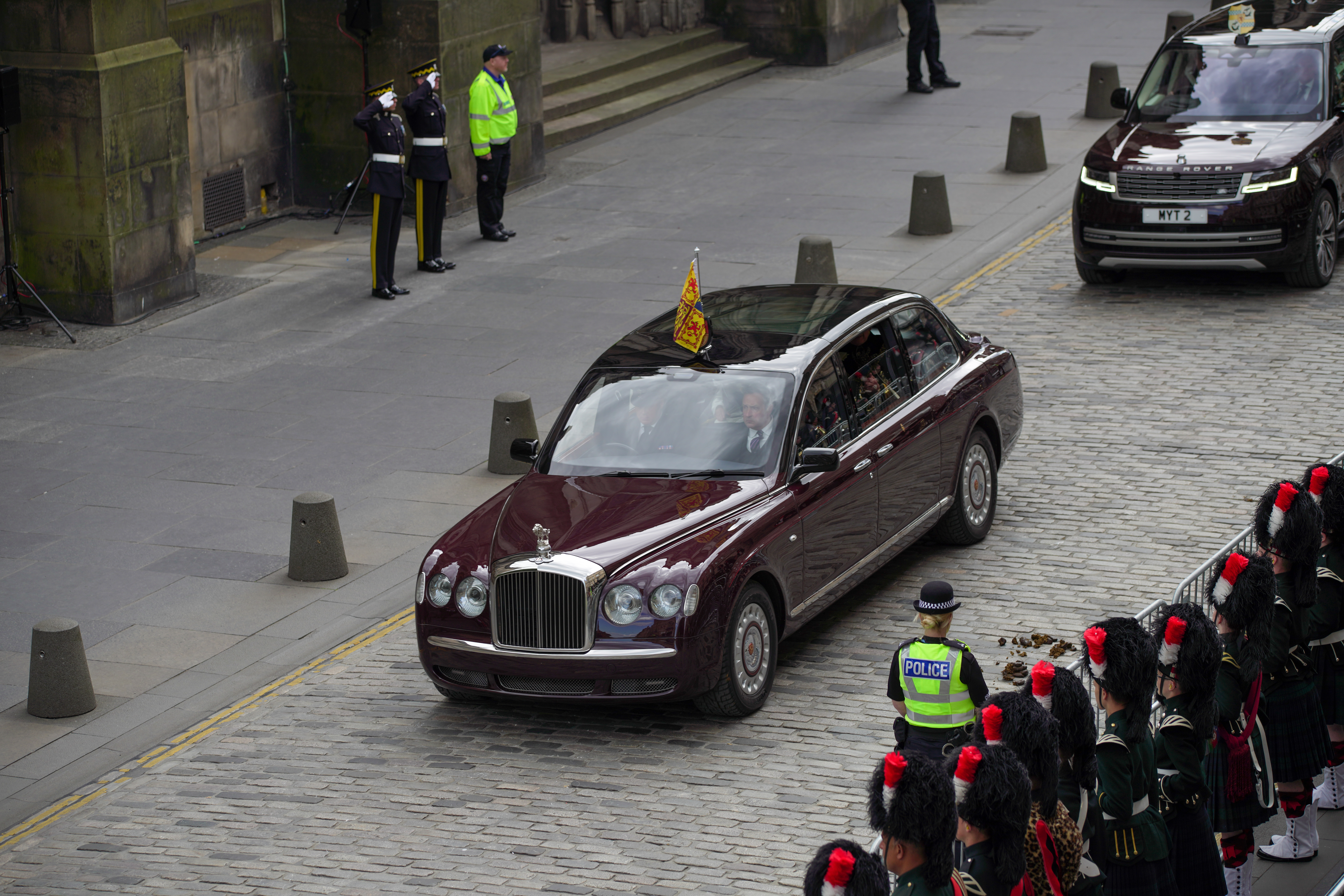
King Charles and Queen Camilla arrive at St Giles' Cathedral in the Bentley State Limousine.

On 5 July 2023, the Honours of Scotland were presented to King Charles III in a ceremony held in St Giles' Cathedral. The ceremony was formally described as a National Service of Thanksgiving and Dedication to mark the coronation of King Charles III and Queen Camilla.

== Background ==
Charles III acceded to the throne immediately upon the death of his mother, Elizabeth II, on 8 September 2022. He was proclaimed king in Scotland on 11 September 2022, the day after the Principal Proclamation in London. Charles and his wife, Camilla, were crowned king and queen on 6 May 2023 at Westminster Abbey. On 9 June 2023, it was confirmed that the King's coronation visit to Scotland would occur on 5 July of that year. A similar ceremony was held for Queen Elizabeth II following her coronation in 1953.

The Honours of Scotland are the oldest crown jewels in Britain. They consist of the Crown, the sceptre and the sword of state. The newly made Elizabeth Sword was used at the ceremony, replacing the older sword which was deemed too fragile to be used. They were last used in a coronation in 1651 at the Scottish coronation of Charles II at Scone Palace. During the visit of George IV to Scotland in 1822, the Honours were formally presented to the king, the origin of the current ceremony.

== Procession ==
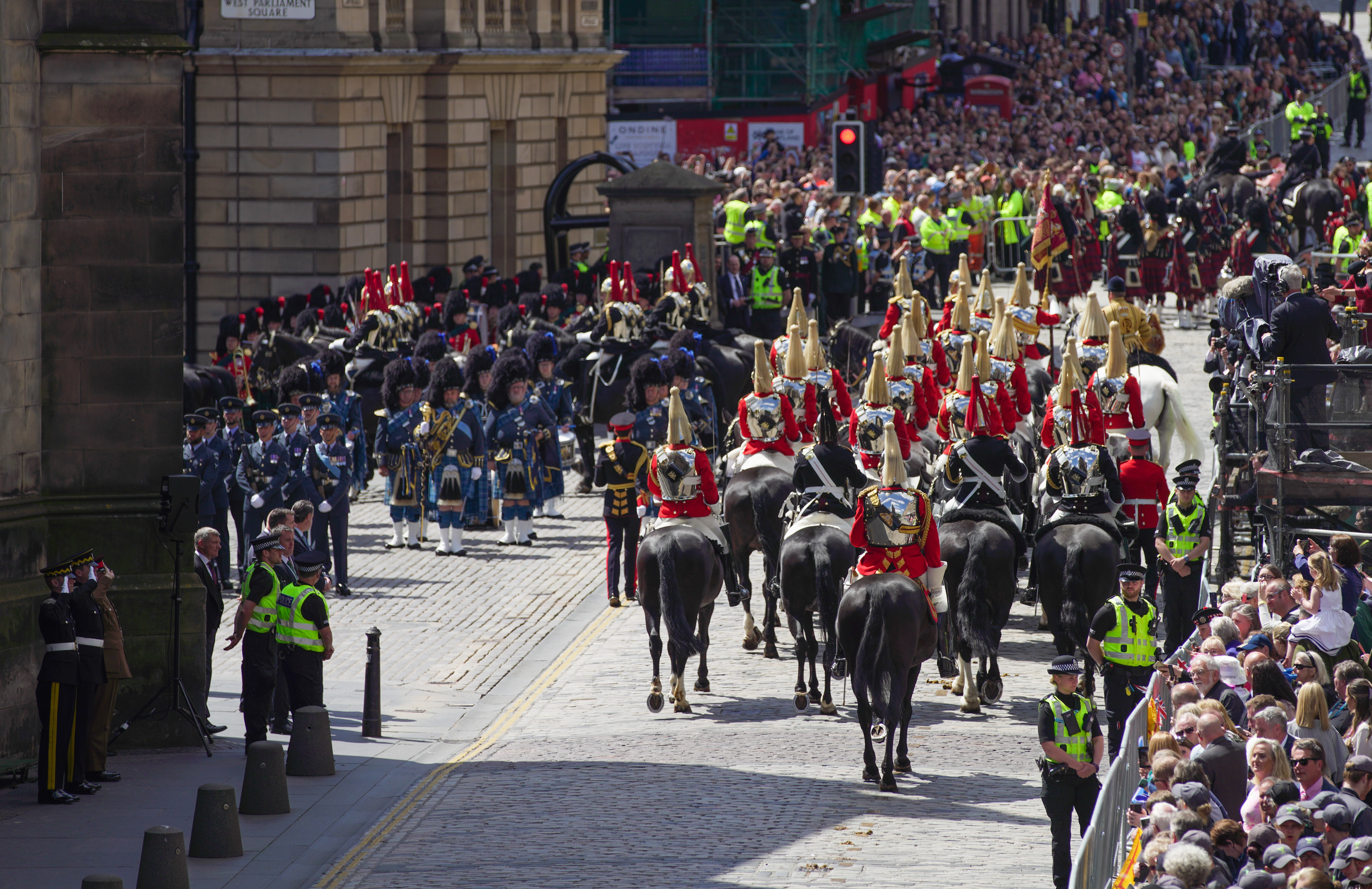
Part of the procession to St Giles' Cathedral

The service was preceded by both a "people's procession" and a royal procession to the cathedral. The people's procession consisted of about 100 people representing various aspects of Scottish life. The Honours of Scotland were brought into the cathedral in the "People's Procession". These were followed by members of the Scottish Parliament and the College of Justice, as well as the heads of Scottish emergency services and members of both the Order of St John in Scotland and the Order of the Thistle. Military participation in the procession included mounted elements of the Royal Scots Dragoon Guards and pipe bands from the Combined Cadet Force and Army Cadet Force A Tri-Service Guard for the Honours of Scotland was formed by detachments from the Royal Navy, the Royal Air Force, the Band of the Royal Regiment of Scotland and Balaklava Company, 5th Battalion, the Royal Regiment of Scotland, with a close escort of the Royal Company of Archers. The royal party was escorted by the Royal Marine Band (Scotland), the Pipes, Drums and Bugles of the 2nd Battalion, the Royal Regiment of Scotland and the Household Cavalry Mounted Regiment.

== Service ==
The Crown was carried into the cathedral by Alexander Douglas-Hamilton, 16th Duke of Hamilton, while the sceptre was carried by Lady Dorrian, the Lord Justice Clerk, and the Elizabeth Sword was carried by Olympian Dame Katherine Grainger. The Stone of Scone was also moved to the cathedral for the service. The service began at 14:15 in St Giles' Cathedral. The First Minister of Scotland, Humza Yousaf, read from Psalm 19, while the sermon was given by the Right Reverend Sally Foster-Fulton, the Moderator of the General Assembly of the Church of Scotland. Blessings and statements of affirmation were made by representatives of Islam, Hinduism, Judaism, Tibetan Buddhism and Humanism. The main element of the service was the ceremonial presentation of each item of the regalia, which the king touched before returning them to their bearers. The Dean said that in offering the royal symbols to the King, "we celebrate the peace and unity of our land and its people, and together we dedicate ourselves anew to serving the common good of our nation".

- Dame Katherine Grainger presented the Elizabeth Sword by saying: "By the symbol of this Sword, we pledge our loyalty, entrusting you to defend our laws, and to uphold justice and peace in our land". The King replied: "In receiving this Sword, I so promise by God's help".
- Lady Dorrian presented the Sceptre by saying: "By the symbol of this Sceptre, we pledge our loyalty, entrusting you to seek the prosperity of this nation, the Commonwealth, and the whole earth". The King replied: "In receiving this Sceptre, I so promise by God's help".
- The Duke of Hamilton and Brandon presented the Crown by saying: "By the symbol of this Crown, we pledge our loyalty, entrusting you to reign as our King in the service of all your people". The King replied: "In receiving this Crown, I so promise by God's help".

The service concluded with the singing of the National Anthem, "God Save the King".

== Afterwards ==
After the ceremony, the King and Queen, joined by Prince William, Duke of Rothesay and Catherine, Duchess of Rothesay, received a 21-gun salute at the Palace of Holyroodhouse, followed by a flypast by the Red Arrows. The ceremony was also met with protests outside the cathedral.

== See also ==
- Duke of Rothesay
- Balmoral Castle
