= Knights of Cardone =

Medieval order of chivalry

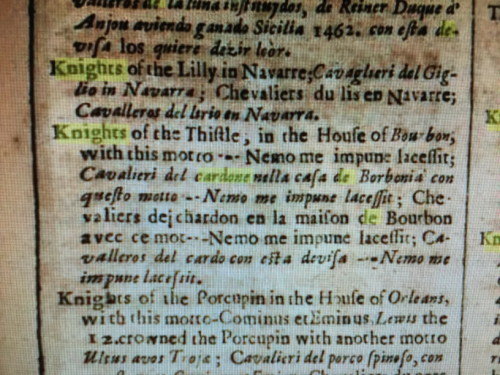
Lexicon Tetraglotton (1660), Seventh Section, "Knights of the Thistle"

The Knights of Cardone were a medieval order of chivalry. They are noted for their role in the Siege of Negroponte (1470). Under the Venetian command of Admiral Pierre d'Aubusson the Knights of Cardone prepared for battle against Ottoman forces led by Mehmed II. Venetian General Nicolo da Canale lost his nerve and ordered d'Aubusson to retreat, which resulted in the loss of Negroponte, and the island of Euboea. Subsequently, during the Siege of Rhodes (1480), d'Aubusson and his Knights successfully defended against another Ottoman attack by Mehmed II.

== Early history ==
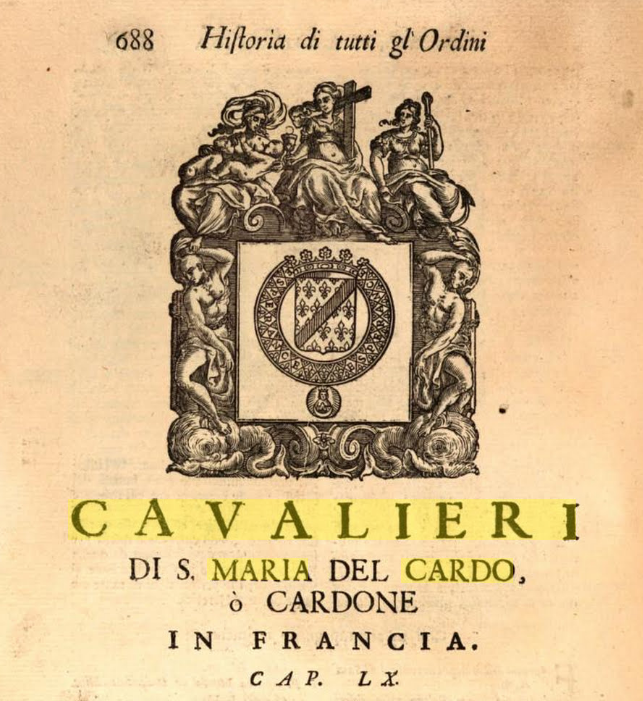
Historie cronologiche dell'origine degl'Ordini Militari (1692), "Cavalieri del Cardone"

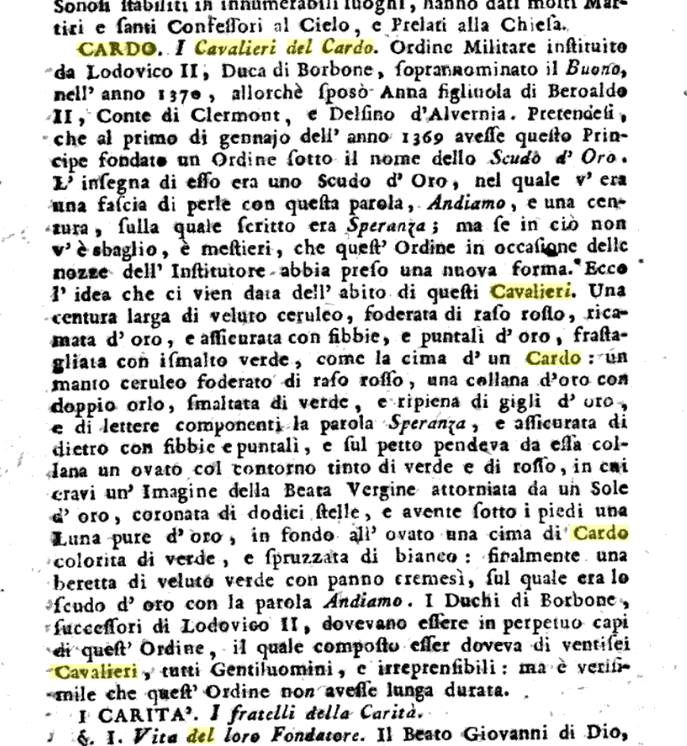
Dizionario Storico Portatile (1792), "Cavalieri del Cardo"

The military order of the Cavalieri del Cardo (Knights of Cardone) was established in 1370 by Louis II, Duke of Bourbon (1337–1410). Cardo and Cardone translate as thistle in English. The order continued through successor Dukes of the House of Bourbon up until the reign of King Louis XIV.

== Lexicon Tetraglotton ==
The Lexicon Tetraglotton is an English-French-Italian-Spanish dictionary published in 1660. Contained within the seventh section of the Lexicon Tetraglotton is an entry for the Knights of the Thistle. The Italian representation is "Cavalieri del cardone nella caſa de Bourbonia" (Knights of Cardone of the House of Bourbon). The French representation is "Chevaliers de chardon" and the Spanish representation is "Cavalleros del cardo". The motto "Nemo me impune lacessit" is Latin, which translates to "No one provokes me with impunity". This motto is shared with the present Order of the Thistle, which was established in 1687.
