= Nemo me impune lacessit =

Latin motto of the Kingdom of Scotland

The royal arms used in Scotland, showing the motto on a scroll beneath the shield

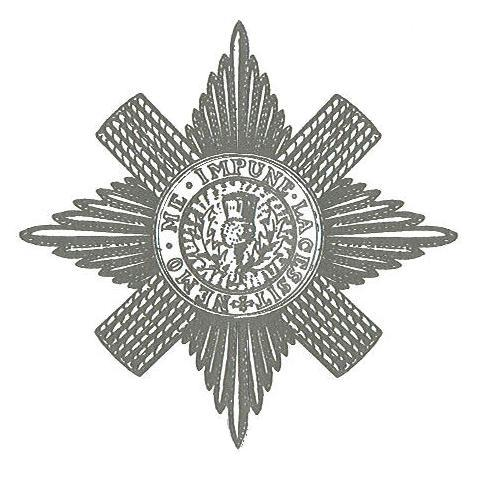
Star of the Order of the Thistle, bearing the motto on a circlet

Nemo me impune lacessit (Latin for 'No one provokes me with impunity') is the national motto of Scotland.

The motto was used by the royal Stuart dynasty of Scotland from at least the reign of James VI, when it appeared on the reverse side of merk coins minted in 1578 and 1580. It is the adopted motto of the Order of the Thistle and of three Scottish regiments of the British Army.

The motto also appears, in conjunction with the collar of the Order of the Thistle, in later versions of the royal arms of the Kingdom of Scotland and subsequently in the Scottish version of the royal arms of the United Kingdom. It has been loosely rendered into Scots as Wha daur meddle wi' me?, (Scots pronunciation: [ʍɑː dɔːɾ ˈmɛdɫ̩ wɪ miː]) and into Gaelic as Cha togar m' fhearg gun dìoladh (pronounced [xa ˈt̪ʰokəɾ ˈmɛɾak kuɲ ˈtʲiəl̪ˠəɣ]).

== Possible origin of the motto ==
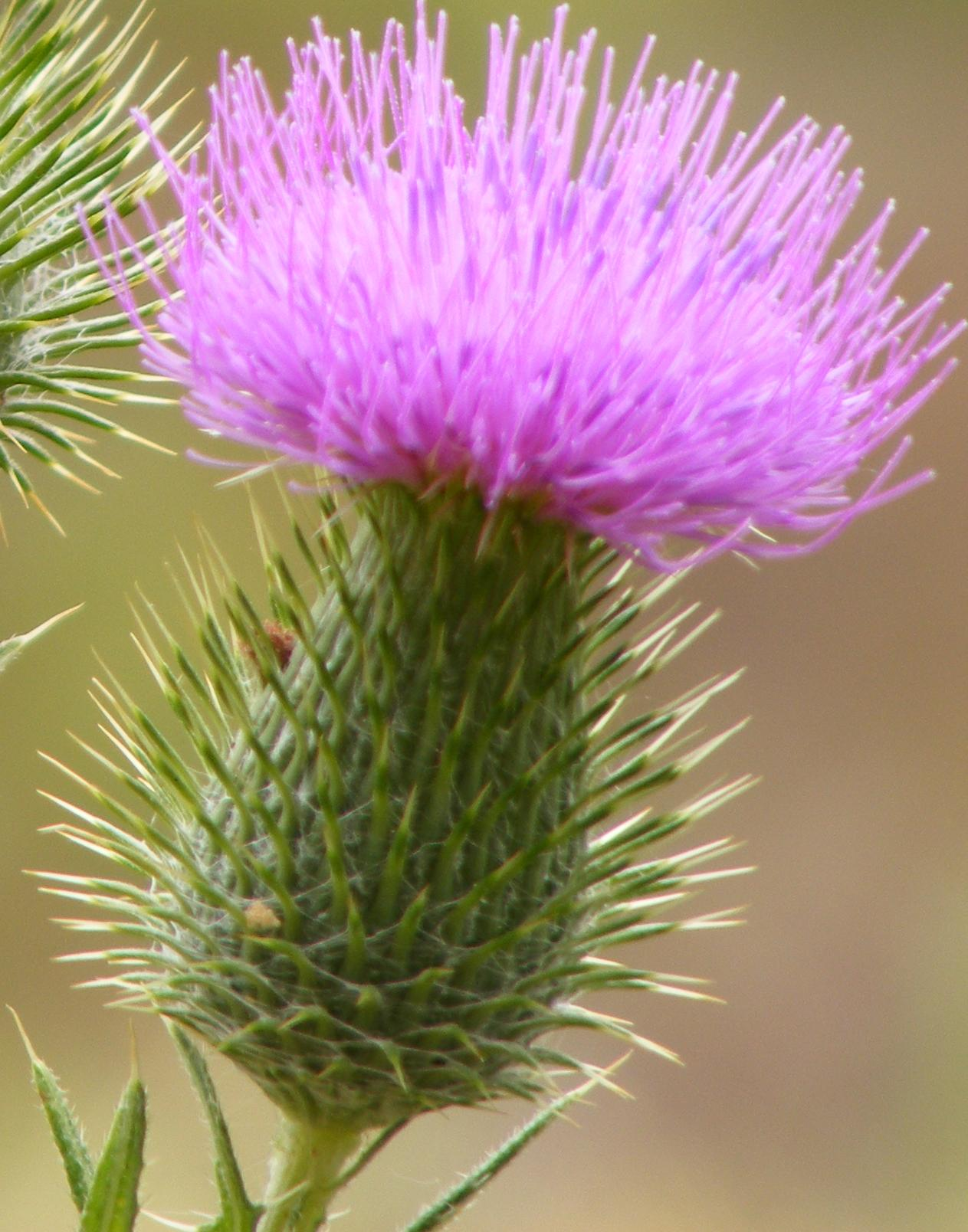
Scotland's floral emblem

According to legend, the "guardian thistle" (see Cirsium vulgare) played a vital part in Alexander III, King of Scots' defence of the Kingdom of Scotland against a night-time raiding party of Vikings under King Haakon IV of Norway, prior to the Battle of Largs (1263): one or more raiders let out a yell of pain when stepping on a prickly thistle, thus alerting the Scots. Another version of the legend tells the same story connected with a battle of King Kenneth II against the Danes near Luncarty in 980AD. The motto "No one harasses me with impunity" (Latin: Nemo me impune lacessit), "me" was therefore originally the thistle itself, but by extension now refers to the Scottish regiments which have adopted it.

The modern form of the motto was used by Francesco I, Duke of Milan and had been used in Britain on the colours of the Scottish Royalist officer John Urry during the English Civil War. It was also used by the Parliamentarian propagandist Marchamont Nedham as the motto for his newsletters.

Another traditional source appears in the form of a Scots proverb, "Ye maunna tramp on the Scotch thistle, laddie", this being immortalised in marble by Glasgow monumental sculptors James Gibson & Co. for the Kelvingrove International Exhibition of 1888. The phrase "Wha daur meddle wi' me?" also appears in a traditional border ballad entitled "Little Jock Elliot", which recalls the exploits of a 16th-century Border Reiver ("John Elliot of the Park"), with particular reference to an infamous encounter in the summer of 1566 with James Hepburn, 4th Earl of Bothwell, the third husband of Mary, Queen of Scots.

The French city of Nancy has a similar Latin motto: Non inultus premor ("I cannot be touched unavenged"), also a reference to the thistle, which is a symbol of the region of Lorraine.

== Present and historical use of the motto ==
=== In the British Isles and Commonwealth ===
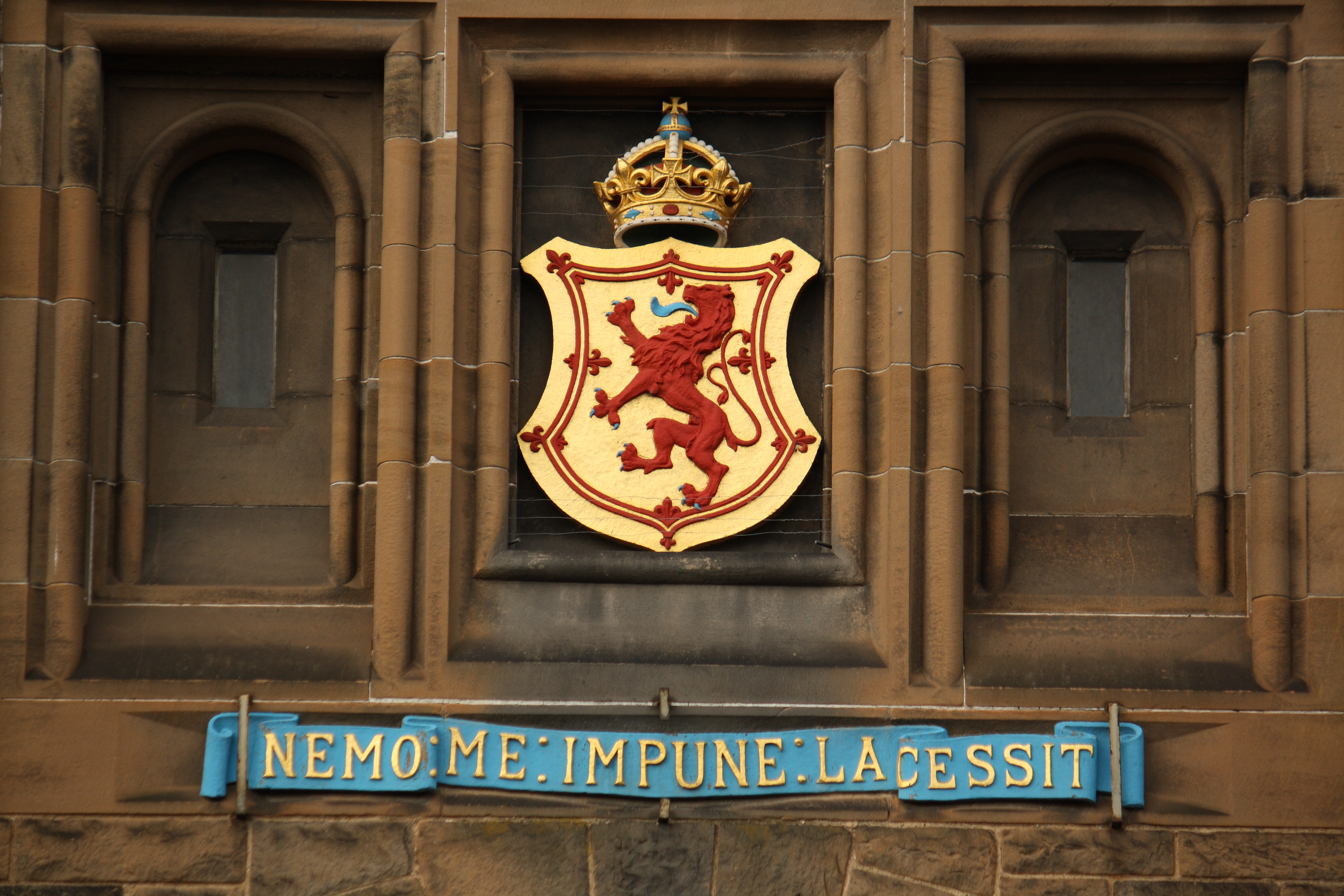
The motto displayed above the entrance to Edinburgh Castle

The motto of the Most Ancient and Most Noble Order of the Thistle, the Scottish chivalrous order, is also that of the British Army regiments The Royal Regiment of Scotland, Scots Guards and Royal Scots Dragoon Guards. It was also the motto of several former units of the British Army, including the Royal Scots, Royal Scots Greys, Royal Highland Fusiliers and Black Watch, some of which went on to be amalgamated to form the Royal Regiment of Scotland in 2006. The motto is also that of the Royal Company of Archers and has been displayed upon the unit's second standard since 1713, following the grant of a Royal charter by Queen Anne.

During the reign of Charles II, the motto, appearing on a scroll under the shield and overlying the compartment, was added to the Royal coat of arms of Scotland, as displayed in relief above the entrance to Holyrood Palace. Since 1707 it has appeared in the Scottish version of the arms of British Monarchs, including the present Royal coat of arms of the United Kingdom used in Scotland. The motto appears in conjunction with the collar of the Order of the Thistle, which is placed around the shield. (The collar of the order appears in earlier versions of the Royal coat of arms of Scotland, but without the order motto.)

The motto of the Order of the Thistle (Nemo me impune lacessit) should not be confused with the motto of the Royal arms (In Defens), which appears on an escroll above the crest in the tradition of Scottish heraldry (In Defens being an abbreviated form of the full motto In My Defens God Me Defend). Nemo me impune lacessit is displayed prominently above the Gatehouse entrance added to Edinburgh Castle in 1888.

Armed forces units elsewhere have also adopted this historic motto. In Australia, members of Heavy Weapons Platoon (DFSW) of the 3rd battalion (PARA) Royal Australian Regiment proudly use this motto as a symbol of platoon brotherhood and bonds forged in service together, the motto was also used by the Victoria Scottish Regiment, which subsequently became 5th Battalion Royal Victoria Regiment (RVR) which now forms one of the rifle companies of the RVR. (The motto is also used by the RVR Pipes and Drums Association). The Black Watch (Royal Highland Regiment) of Canada, a reserve infantry regiment of the Canadian Forces, also bears this motto (the motto appearing upon the regimental cap badge).

The motto is also that of the Cape Town Highlanders Regiment, a reserve mechanised infantry unit of South African Army.

The Caledonian Railway used the motto as part of its crest, until "grouped" into the London, Midland and Scottish railway in 1923.

The motto (with the verb in the future tense [lacesset]: "Nemo Me Impune Lacesset") appears as a reverse inscription on the Scottish "Bawbee" (6 pence) coin of King Charles II surrounding a crowned thistle. Examples exist for 1677, 1678 and 1679. The coin is scarce but not considered rare. This coin is of copper, and was later revalued as a half penny.

The motto appears as an inscription on the rim of the 1984 (and 1989) "Thistle and royal diadem" and the 1994 (and 1999) "Lion rampant" designs of the "Scottish" themed editions of the British one pound coin, and again on the rim of one of two new "floral" designs for 2014.

Union College, University of Queensland, Australia, also adopted the motto.

The motto also appears on the back collar of Edinburgh Rugby official kit.

=== In continental Europe ===
In Belgium, the 1st Squadron of the Belgian Air Force bears the motto.

The motto was also used by the Italian noble family Malacrida, of Como.

Wilhelm II, German Emperor used the motto in a telegram to Foreign Minister Bernhard von Bülow on 7 November 1897 following the Kiautschou Bay concession, arguing that Chinese aggression towards Catholic missionaries would no longer be tolerated, and would be met with swift military action.

The motto also appears above the entrance of a gate in Gent (see nl:Citadel van Gent).

It was the motto of the Swedish Tre Kronor-class cruiser HSwMS Göta Lejon.

It is the motto of Smålands Nation in Uppsala.

It is the motto of Z-sektionen in Chalmers Tekniska Högskola.

=== In North America ===
Cap badge of The Black Watch (Royal Highland Regiment) of Canada

The 1st Battalion, 24th Marines of the United States Marine Corps uses the phrase as its motto.

The motto also appears (with the verb in the future tense: Nemo Me Impune Lacesset) above an American timber rattlesnake on a 1778 $20 bill from Georgia as an early example of the colonial use of the coiled rattlesnake symbol, which later became famous on the Gadsden flag. The phrase also occasionally appears on mourning bands worn over the badges of law enforcement officers in the United States.

Nemo me impune lacessit is the motto of Dartmouth College's independent conservative newspaper, The Dartmouth Review.

The motto also appears on the crest of the Grand National Curling Club.

The motto is adopted by the eponymous heroine of Fran Ross's 1974 novel, Oreo, republished in 2000 by Northeastern University Press.

The motto was seemingly adopted by Elon Musk in a January 2025 post pinned to his X account, erroneously attributing the saying to Sulla.

=== In India ===
On 10 December 1992, addressing Gentleman Cadets at the Indian Military Academy, India's Field Marshal Sam Manekshaw conveyed the motto from a regiment he had served in Scotland, first conveying the Latin form, "Nemo me impune lacessit" and then translating it for the GCs:

... in soldier's language, "If my enemy punches me on my nose I shall black both his eyes and make him swallow his teeth. Let that be your motto. No one must provoke you with impunity."

— Field Marshal Sam Manekshaw, (Singh 2007, p. 208)

=== In fiction ===
- In the short story "The Cask of Amontillado" by Edgar Allan Poe (Poe was adopted by a Scottish merchant), Nemo me impune lacessit is the motto on the family coat of arms of the character Montresor.
- In the 1986 science fiction novel Fiasco by Stanisław Lem, Nemo me impune lacessit is quoted on several occasions in response to hostile acts during attempted contacts with an alien civilisation.
- In the 1994 novel Mortal Causes by Ian Rankin, the motto is a clue in solving a young man's murder.
- In the miniature wargame Battletech, the motto is used by the Black Watch, the elite guard of the Star League Defense Force.

== See also ==
- Knights of Cardone
- Noli me tangere – "touch me not"
- Don't Tread on Me
- Me ne frego – (roughly) "I don't care"
