= H7 =

H7, H07 or H-7 may refer to:

- H7 Chaffron Way, a road part of the Milton Keynes grid road system
- British NVC community H7, a heath communities in the British National Vegetation Classification system
- DSC-H7, a 2007 Sony Cyber-shot H series camera
- Halloween H20: 20 Years Later, the seventh installment in the Halloween series
- Highway H07 (Ukraine), a road in Ukraine
- HMS H7, a 1915 British H-class submarine
- HMS Defender (H07), a 1932 D-class destroyer of the British Royal Navy
- Influenza A virus subtype H7 (disambiguation), all virus containing the H7 type agglutinin
- USS H-7 (SS-150), a 1918 United States Navy H-class submarine
- H7 (monogram), monogram of Haakon VII of Norway and Norwegian World War II resistance symbol
- H7 (lamp), an automotive halogen lamp
- Hydrogen-7 (H-7 or ^{7}H), an isotope of hydrogen
- Haval H7, automotive nameplate from Great Wall Motors
- Hongqi H7, a mid-size luxury sedan

== See also ==
- 7H (disambiguation)
