= Alessandro Armillotta =

British businessperson and activist

- Born: England
- Citizenship: Italian-British
- Occupations: Businessperson; environmental activist; public speaker
- Organization: AWorld
- Known for: Co-founder of AWorld

Alessandro "Alex" Armillotta is an Italian-British businessperson, environmental activist, and public speaker. He is the co-founder of AWorld, a climate technology company based in Turin. In 2020, the United Nations selected AWorld as the platform for its ActNow campaign, which promotes individual action on climate change. Armillotta also created Giornata della Terra Torino, an annual Earth Day event held in Turin.

== Early life and education ==
Armillotta was born in England and moved with his family to Italy at the age of six. He entered the fashion industry at an early age and did not attend university.

== Career ==
=== Fashion ===
Armillotta founded and later sold Comicstore, an online retailer of Disney-licensed products. He later established One Star Fashion, a company that sourced and supplied luxury products internationally. From 2015 to 2017, he served as CEO of Buy2Bee, a B2B fashion e-commerce platform based in Santhià, and during his tenure it received an award from Netcomm eCommerce Forum.

In 2017, Armillotta became president of Bluefly, a luxury online retailer based in New York City, serving until 2018. He also worked with the Hilfiger family on the development and management of Italian product lines. In 2018, he founded NeWants, a decentralized, gamified e-commerce platform that partnered with Bluefly. He later worked with One World, a Shanghai-based fast fashion conglomerate.

=== AWorld ===
In 2019, Armillotta co-founded AWorld in Turin with Marco Armellino and Alessandro Lancieri. The company launched a cloud-based platform and mobile app that educates users about sustainability and measures the environmental impact of individual actions through gamification and behavioral science. In September 2020, during the United Nations General Assembly, the United Nations Department of Global Communications selected AWorld as the official platform for its ActNow campaign on climate change and the Sustainable Development Goals. In 2023, AWorld was nominated Google's App of the year.

In 2022, Armillotta climbed Mount Kilimanjaro and raised the Sustainable Development Goals flag at the summit. He is also a TED speaker.

=== Giornata della Terra Torino ===
In 2023, Armillotta founded and organized the first Giornata della Terra Torino (Earth Day Turin) and support from Fondazione Compagnia di San Paolo. It is held annually at the Cavallerizza Reale and Giardini Reali.

In April 2024, the second edition was held, which marked the official opening of G7 Planet Week in Turin. The program featured United Nations climate communications chief Martina Donlon and Italian virologist Ilaria Capua and concluded with the Mole Antonelliana illuminated in green.
