= Edwardus Rex Imperator =

Edwardus Rex Imperator is a Royal and Imperial Cypher of the following Kings of the United Kingdom:

- Edward VII
- Edward VIII
