= HH7 =

HH7 or HH-7 may refer to:

- In Enemy Hands (novel), the seventh novel in the Honor Harrington series by David Weber, abbreviated HH7
- HH7, one of the Hamburger–Hamilton stages in chick development
- GNRHR, Gonadotropin-releasing hormone receptor, also called HH7

== See also ==
- H7 (disambiguation)
