= Ilaria Capua =

Italian virologist and politician

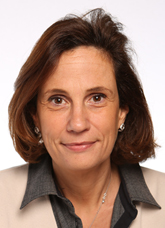
- Born: Rome
- Citizenship: Italian
- Education: University of Perugia, Padua University
- Known for: politics, virologist, avian influenza
- Scientific career
- Workplaces: Istituto Zooprofilattico Sperimentale delle Venezie, University of Florida

Ilaria Capua (born 21 April 1966 in Rome) is an Italian virologist and former politician, best known for her research on influenza viruses, particularly avian influenza, and her efforts promoting open access to genetic information on emerging viruses as part of pre-pandemic preparedness efforts.

Capua is currently a professor at the Institute of Food and Agricultural Science (IFAS), and has a joint appointment with the College of Veterinary Medicine and the College of Public Health and Health Professions at the University of Florida in Gainesville, Florida, U.S. She was recruited to direct and lead the UF One Health Center of Excellence in research and training.

A veterinarian by training, Capua has mainly worked in the field of veterinary virology and zoonotic viral infections.

She worked for over twenty years in the network of the Istituti Zooprofilattici in Italy, and headed the national and international reference laboratory for Newcastle disease and Avian Influenza at IZSVE for over ten years. In response to the 1999-2000 outbreak of avian flu in Italy, Capua and colleagues proposed and developed a novel strategy for vaccinating commercial poultry against the disease, which was adopted and enabled the industry to avoid a complete shutdown.

In February 2006, Capua drew international attention when she challenged the existing system for granting scientists access to genetic material sequenced from influenza viruses. At the peak of the H5N1 panzootic, Capua decided to post the sequence of the first H5N1 African virus on a publicly accessible website (GenBank) rather than contribute the data to a password-protected database maintained in Los Alamos and accessible only to a small group of researchers.

During this time, Capua led an international campaign promoting free access to genetic sequences derived from influenza viruses and other viruses with pandemic potential. One observer described Capua as "belonging to a longstanding tradition of scientists rebelling against established ideas and the upper echelon among their colleagues" but also advocating a new outlook in which scientific cooperation is "enacted directly between scientists and not mediated by institutions."

== Biography ==
=== Training ===
Born in Rome in 1966, Ilaria Capua graduated with honors in veterinary medicine from the University of Perugia in 1989. In 1991, she completed a post-graduate specialization course in animal health and hygiene at the University of Pisa. She obtained a Ph.D. from the University of Padua in 2007 on avian influenza epidemiology, inter-species transmission and control.

=== Scientific activities ===
Prior to joining the Italian Parliament, Capua served as director of the Department of Comparative Biomedical Sciences for the Istituto Zooprofilattico Sperimentale delle Venezie (IZSVe), Legnaro in Padua. The department is home to the National FAO/OIE Reference Laboratory for Avian Influenza and Newcastle Disease, and is the OIE Collaborating Centre for Diseases at the Animal/Human Interface.

In 1999–2000, responding to a persistent but relatively non-virulent strain of H7N1 avian flu hindering Italy's commercial poultry industry, Capua and collaborators developed an innovative approach, which was dubbed the "DIVA" strategy (Differentiating Infected from Vaccinated Animals) as a tool to support eradication practices. This DIVA strategy has been invented and developed already years earlier for the eradication of herpesviruses. The strategy involved inoculating poultry with an inactivated vaccine derived from an antigenically related H7N3 virus—coupled with a diagnostic test directed to identifying antibodies to the neuraminidase antigen, that revealed whether avian-flu antibodies present in a subject animal were caused by the H7N3 vaccine or by the field H7N1 virus. Once approved by the European Union, the program went live in November 2000. The strategy enabled Italy's poultry industry to continue trade and the target pathogen was eradicated from Italy. Today, DIVA is among the strategies recommended by the European Union to combat avian influenza on a global scale.

During the outbreak of panzootic H5N1 influenza, which could be transmitted from birds to people, Capua's lab in Padua received a sample of the viral strain recently introduced in Nigeria for typing and characterization. Capua believed that broader circulation of knowledge related to genetic information on contemporary viruses was essential to improve preparedness and response, and declined the offer to submit the genetic sequence to a password-protected database as suggested by WHO. Instead, she decided to deposit the genetic sequences to GenBank, a publicly accessible database, to make it available to the entire scientific community. On February 16, 2006, Capua contacted about 50 of her colleagues and encouraged them to deposit avian influenza genetic sequences in publicly accessible databases. The journal Science reported on Capua's effort, stating that she had "renewed the debate about how to balance global health against scientists' needs to publish and countries’ demands for secrecy."

Capua's initiative was covered by the international press including the Wall Street Journal, the New York Times and the Washington Post. The English-language scientific press continued to cover the debate, as did mainstream European press.

Recently, Capua has been coordinator of the workgroup on Avian Influenza of EPIZONE scientific excellence network, which has been set up to improve the control of the epizootic diseases in Europe. It consists of more than 300 researchers from 16 international research centres – two of them outside Europe. Epizone is a new European Commission project under the sixth research framework programme (FP6), priority 5 (food quality and safety), and it has a budget of €14 million over five years.

Today, the WHO, FAO, and OIE promote and support better sharing mechanisms, data transparency, and an interdisciplinary approach to improve preparedness for pandemic events.

Capua has authored and co-authored more than 200 peer-reviewed publications, mainly on viral diseases of animals and diseases that can be transmitted from animals to people. She has also co-authored two scientific textbooks concerning influenza and authored four non-fiction books for general readership. Capua also serves on the editorial board of Pathogens and Global Health.

Since June 2016, Capua has been a faculty member with the University of Florida in Gainesville, Florida, U.S. At UF, she has continued to advocate for interdisciplinary work and open science, particularly open access to research data on pandemic diseases.

In 2021 she raised concerns on gain-of-function experiments.

=== Personal history ===
Ilaria Capua is married to a Scotsman, Richard, and has a daughter born in 2004.

=== Political activities ===
In January 2013, Capua was asked to run for a seat on the Italian Parliament by Mario Monti, the Italian Prime Minister at the time, who sought to add scientists and academics to Parliament. Capua accepted, and in February 2013 was elected a member of the Italian Chamber of Deputies, one of the two divisions of the Italian Parliament. Capua served for over two years as vice president of the Commission for Science, Culture, and Education of the Chamber of Deputies.

Ilaria Capua resigned as a member of the Italian Parliament on September 28, 2016. Her resignation speech was published in the first page of Corriere della Sera.

== Legal proceedings ==
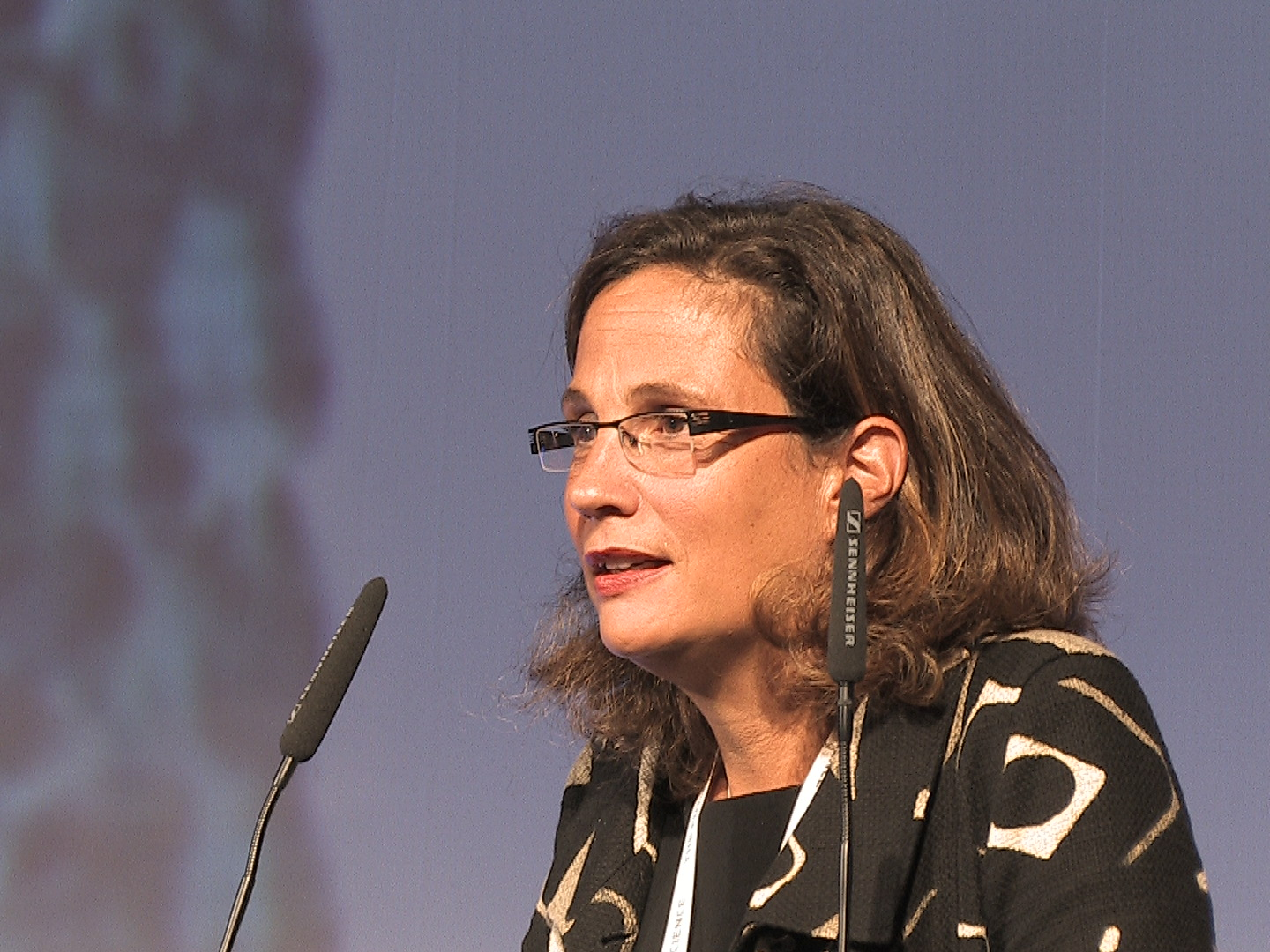
Ilaria Capua

In 2014, while she was a parliamentarian, the Italian weekly magazine l'Espresso revealed that Capua had been the subject of a ten-year criminal investigation by Italian police. The magazine's cover article reported a conspiracy between scientists and pharmaceutical companies to increase the sales of vaccines by deliberately spreading viruses.

In July 2016, Capua was cleared of all charges by the judge for preliminary investigation of the Court of Verona, because "there was no case to answer." The judge's decision mentioned that "there was evidence of fabrication of evidence against her."

== Works and publications ==
=== Books ===
- Ilaria Capua, Franco Mutinelli, A Color Atlas and Text on Avian Influenza, Reno, Papi Editore, 2001, ISBN 9788888369006.
- Ilaria Capua, Idee per diventare veterinario. Prevenire l'influenza aviaria e altre malattie degli animali (Ideas for veterinarians-to-be. Prevention of avian flu and other veterinary diseases), Bologna, Zanichelli, 2007, ISBN 978-88-08-26628-6.
- Ilaria Capua, Dennis Alexander (Eds), Avian Influenza and Newcastle Disease: A Field and Laboratory Manual, Milan, Springer Healthcare Italia S.r.l., 2009, ISBN 978-88-470-0825-0.
- Ilaria Capua, I virus non aspettano, Avventure, disavventure e riflessioni di una scienziata globetrotter (Viruses do not wait. Adventures, misadventures and reflections of a globetrotting scientist), Venezia, Marsilio, 2012, ISBN 978-88-317-1295-8.
- Ilaria Capua, l'Abbecedario di Montecitorio: La Camera dei Deputati in un surreale dizionario dalla A alla Z (The Abecedarium of Montecitorio: The Chamber of Deputies in a surreal dictionary from A to Z), Padua, In Edibus, 2016, ISBN 9788897221470
- Ilaria Capua, Io trafficante di virus (I, the virus trafficker), Rizzoli, 2017, ISBN 978-88-17-09387-3.
- Ilaria Capua, Circular Health: Empowering the One Health Revolution, EGEA Spa - Bocconi University Press, 2020

=== Publications ===
Ilaria Capua's publications in peer-reviewed journals can be found on PubMed.

== Honors and awards ==
- 2005 - Houghton Trust Award (WVPA)
- 2006 - ProMED-mail Anniversary Award for Excellence in Outbreak Reporting on the Internet
- 2007 - Scientific American 50 award by the magazine Scientific American
- 2008 - Named a "Revolutionary Mind" by the magazine Seed
- 2009 - "Great Hippocrates Award" from the Italian National Union of Scientific Medical Information
- 2011 - Penn Vet World Leadership in Animal Health Award from the University of Pennsylvania
- 2012 - Grand Officer of the Order of Merit of the Italian Republic
- 2012 - Gordon Memorial Medal Nottingham
- 2013 - International Prize "Guido Lenghi and Flaviano Magrassi 'from' Accademia Nazionale dei Lincei for biological or clinical virology
- 2014 - Excellence Award 2014 awarded by ESCMID, European Society of Clinical Microbiology and Infectious Diseases
- 2017 - International literary prize for Science and Arts, Fondazione PescarAbruzzo
- 2017 - Schofield Medal University of Guelph
