= Influenza A virus subtype H7 =

Influenza A virus subtype H7 may refer to:

- Influenza A virus subtype H7N1
- Influenza A virus subtype H7N2
- Influenza A virus subtype H7N3
- Influenza A virus subtype H7N4
- Influenza A virus subtype H7N7
- Influenza A virus subtype H7N9
