= 7H =

7H or 7-H can refer to:

- A-7H, a model of LTV A-7 Corsair II
- 7H-Benz(de)anthracene-7-one, or Benzanthrone
- Hydrogen-7 (^{7}H), an isotope of hydrogen
- 7H, a model of SET 7 floatplanes
- MD 7H, see Maryland Route 7
- IATA code for Era Alaska
- 7H, the production code for the 1988 Doctor Who serial Remembrance of the Daleks

== See also ==
- H7 (disambiguation)
- Minolta DiMAGE 7Hi, a digital bridge camera by Minolta
