= H7 (monogram) =

Monogram of Haakon VII of Norway

The monogram.

H7 was the royal cypher of the Norwegian head of state, King Haakon VII, who reigned from 1905 to 1957. When Germany invaded Norway in 1940 as a part of World War II, the royal family fled the country and Haakon VII later spearheaded the Norwegian resistance in exile in the United Kingdom. H7 became one of several symbols used by the Norwegian populace to mark solidarity with and loyalty to the King, and adherence to the Norwegian resistance movement.

== World War II ==
According to Minister of Foreign Affairs Bjørn Tore Godal, speaking at the 50th anniversary for Victory in Europe Day, Norway was the only country in which the initials of the head of state became a resistance symbol. The monogram, with H superimposed on 7, was drawn on fences, walls, houses, roads, in the snow and otherwise in the public sphere. It was also used in illegal art. Coins with the H7 symbol were also attached to clothes. Such coins were confiscated by the Nazi authorities. It was also used in the private sphere, among others on the inside of blinds.

A symbol used in a similar way was the "V for victory", as popularised by Winston Churchill. However, the Axis attempted to usurp this sign, supposedly with the new meaning of "V for Viktoria". While this campaign was successful in most of Nazi-occupied Europe, it failed in Norway: Despite continued official use, the opposition also adopted the V-sign as an abbreviation of verlieren (German for "to lose"), and filled in the Nazi V's with the H7 monogram. In fact, this popularized the use of H7, which was soon drawn without the V.

The act of drawing or creating a H7 symbol in German-occupied Norway was punishable by imprisonment. Another possible sanction was terror from Nazi paramilitary groups, to which the police were ordered not to respond.

== Post-war use ==
The symbol was also evoked after World War II to have a commemorative effect, among others at the first post-war Holmenkollen ski jump event, when the symbol was formed in large scale by people. It was also used on post-war coins.

== Gallery ==
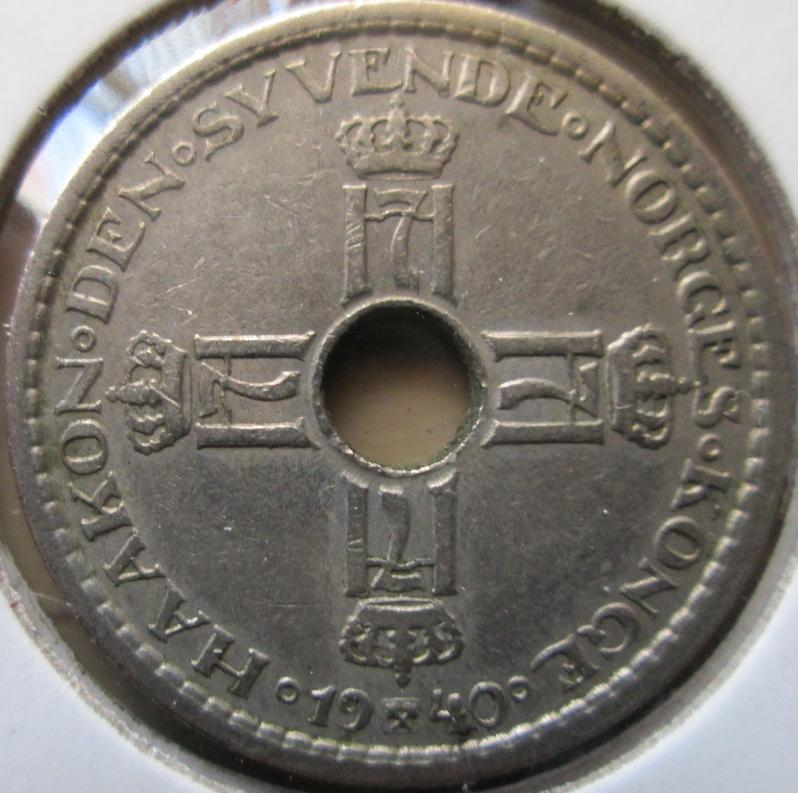
A 1940 Norwegian krone featuring the H7 monogram.

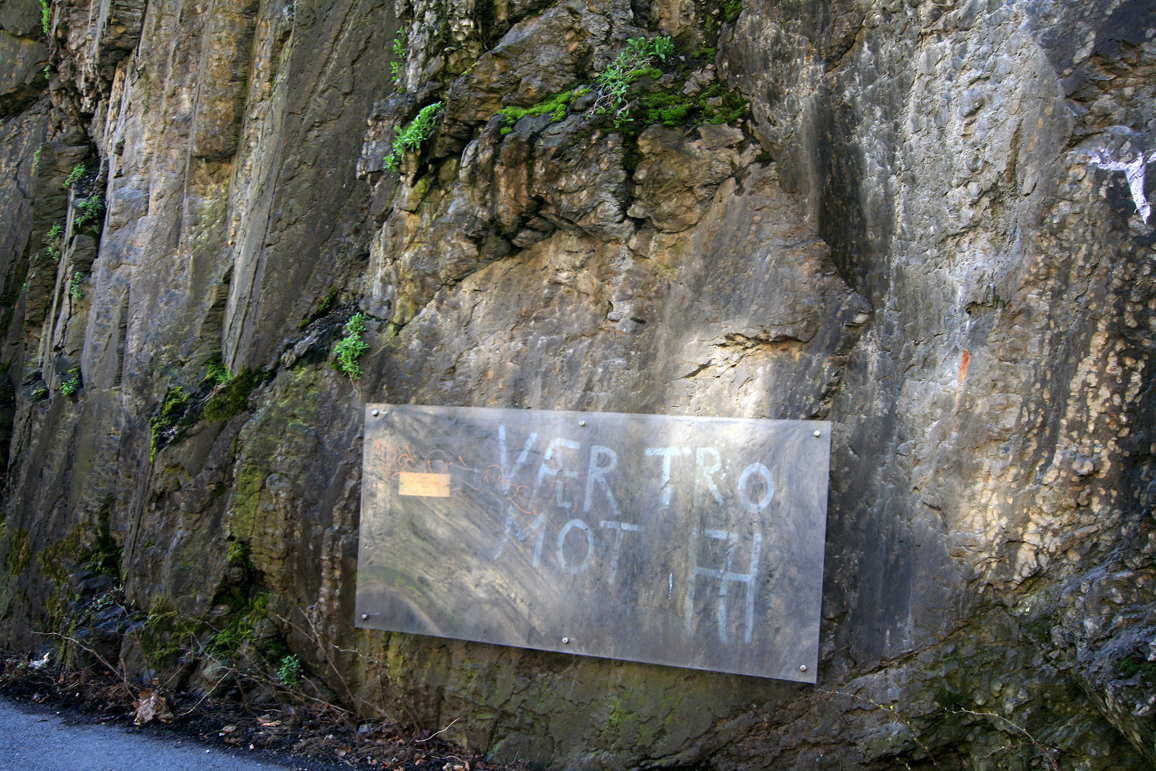
Preserved H7 graffiti in Uranienborg, Oslo.

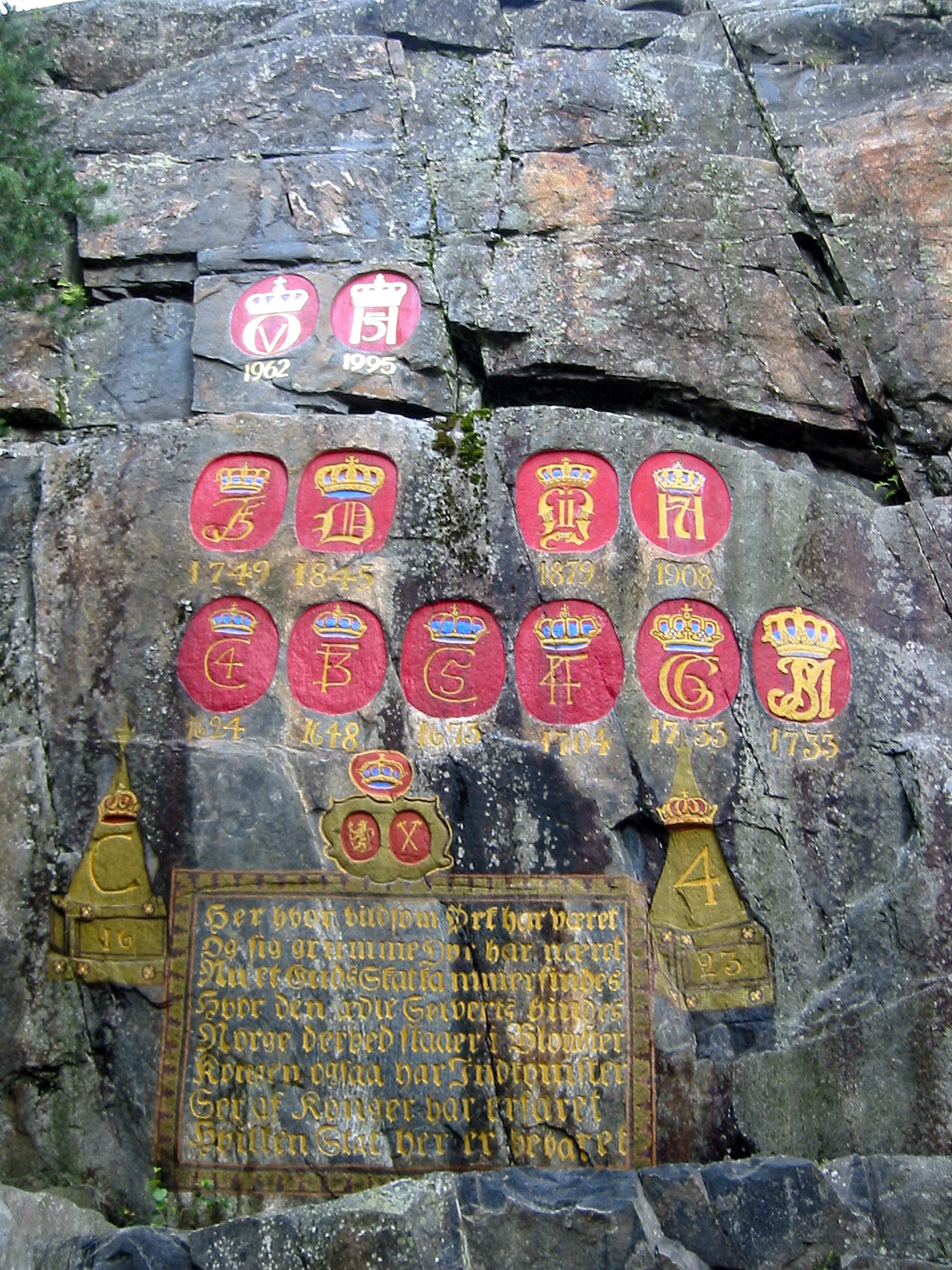
Monograms carved in rock to mark royal visits to Kongsberg since 1623. H7 is on the second row, to the right.

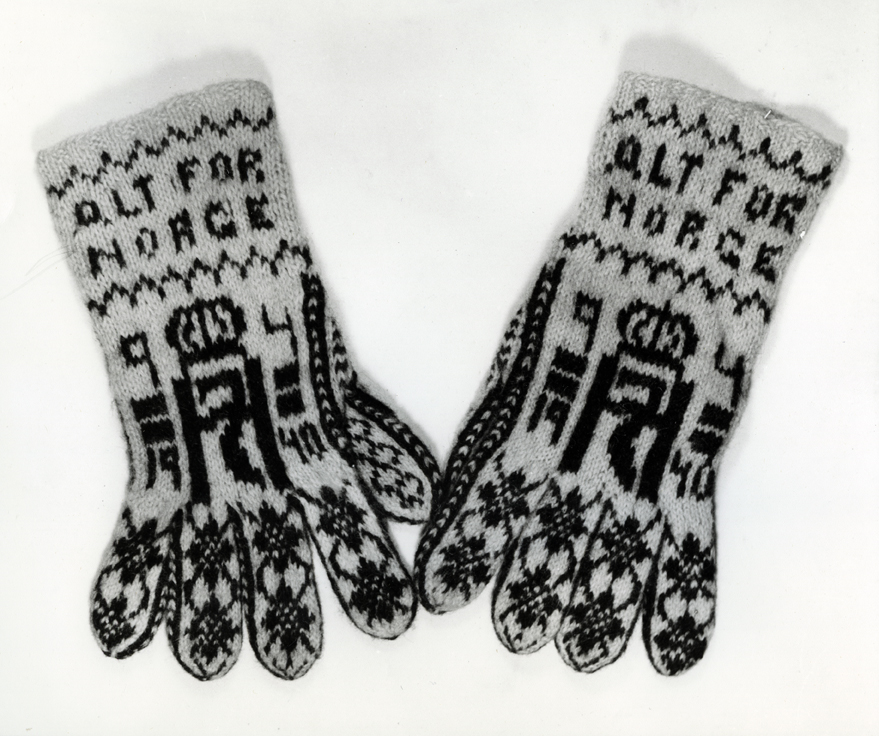
Gloves featuring the H7 monogram

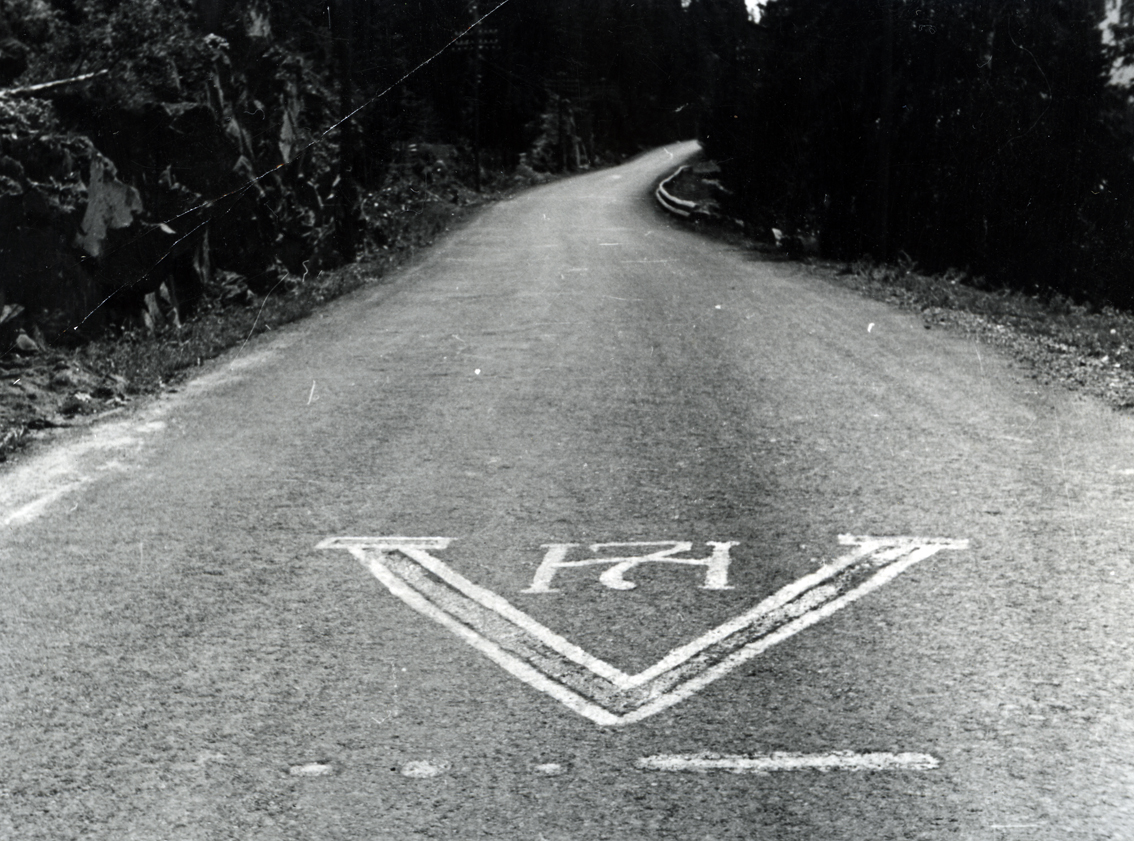
Resistance graffiti on a Norwegian road, depicting the V-sign together with the H7 monogram
