= Royal cypher =

Monogram-like device of a country's reigning sovereign

Royal cypher of King Carl XVI Gustaf of Sweden

In modern heraldry, a royal cypher is a monogram or monogram-like device of a country's reigning sovereign, typically consisting of the initials of the monarch's name and title, sometimes interwoven and often surmounted by a crown. Such a cypher as used by an emperor or empress is called an imperial cypher.

Royal cyphers appear on some government buildings, are impressed upon royal and state documents, and are used by governmental departments. They may also appear on other governmental structures built under a particular ruler.

== Commonwealth realms ==
The use of a royal cypher in the Commonwealth realms originated in the United Kingdom, where the public use of the royal initials dates at least from the early Tudor period, and was simply the initial of the sovereign with, after Henry VIII's reign, the addition of the letter 'R' for 'Rex' or 'Regina' (Latin for "king" and "queen" respectively). The letter 'I' for 'Imperatrix' was added to Queen Victoria's monogram after she became Empress of India in 1877 (or 'Imperator' in the case of an emperor).

The initials – which had no set pattern or form of lettering laid down – were usually shown in company with the royal arms or crown as on the king's manors and palaces, such as those of Henry VIII on the gatehouse of St James's Palace. The purpose seems to have been simply to identify an individual sovereign, particularly on certain landmarks that he or she has commissioned, as the royal coat of arms in contrast was often used by successive monarchs and is therefore not distinct. The initials are furthermore used on government papers, duty stamps and similar objects, and are surmounted throughout the United Kingdom (except in Scotland) and the Commonwealth realms by a stylised version of the Tudor Crown or St Edward's Crown; in Scotland, the Crown of Scotland is used instead.

Though royal symbols (including, most notably, the coat of arms, royal standards and great seals) differ among the 15 Commonwealth realms, as they are separate monarchies, the one sovereign uses the same cypher throughout all of his or her countries. Distinction continues to be made between the personal cypher and the simpler, more workaday public initials, the former being the sovereign's own monogram and the latter simply a means of identifying a reign. Nowadays, the initials are also called the royal cypher, but, to aid clarification, the monogram is referred to as the royal cypher interlaced and reversed.

The royal cyphers have been incorporated by the Canadian Heraldic Authority into the various royal standards of Canada. The use in Canada of the reigning monarch's cypher, which is sometimes uniquely surrounded by a garland of maple leaves, is as a symbol not only of the sovereign him- or herself, but of Canada's full sovereignty.

The royal cypher is used on some Australian military uniforms.

=== Charles III ===
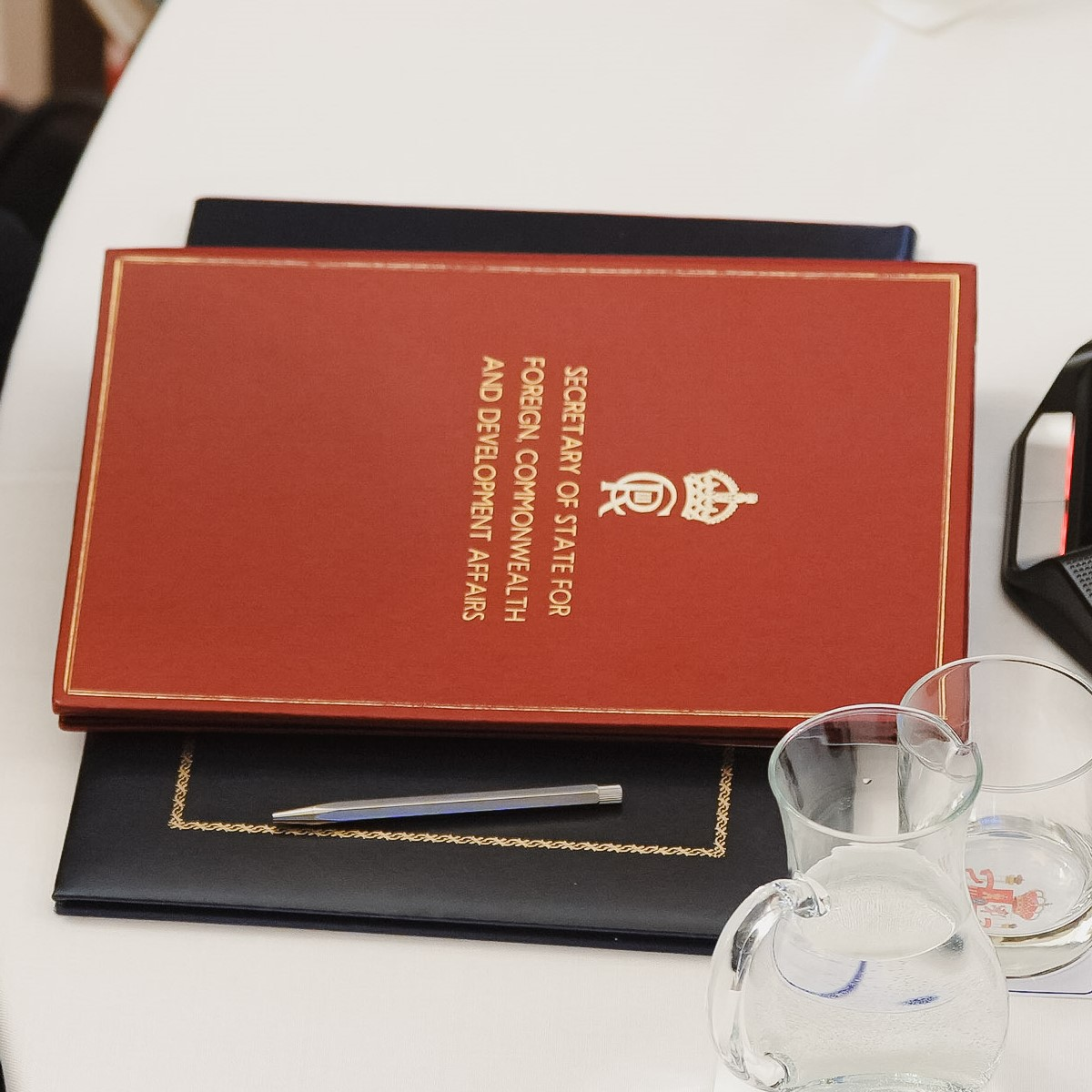
Charles's cypher on David Lammy's folder, 2025

On 26 September 2022, Buckingham Palace unveiled the cypher of the new king, Charles III, that is gradually replacing the cypher of Elizabeth II in everyday use. The design was selected by Charles himself from a series of designs prepared by the College of Arms and features the King's initial "C" intertwined with the letter "R" for Rex with "III" denoting Charles III, with a Tudor Crown above the letters. Charles's Scottish cypher uses the Crown of Scotland instead.

King Charles III's royal cypher surmounted with a Tudor Crown

King Charles III's royal cypher surmounted by the Crown of Scotland

King Charles III's royal cypher surmounted by the Canadian Royal Crown

Dual cypher of King Charles III and Queen Camilla

Royal cypher of Queen Camilla, consort of King Charles III

=== Elizabeth II ===
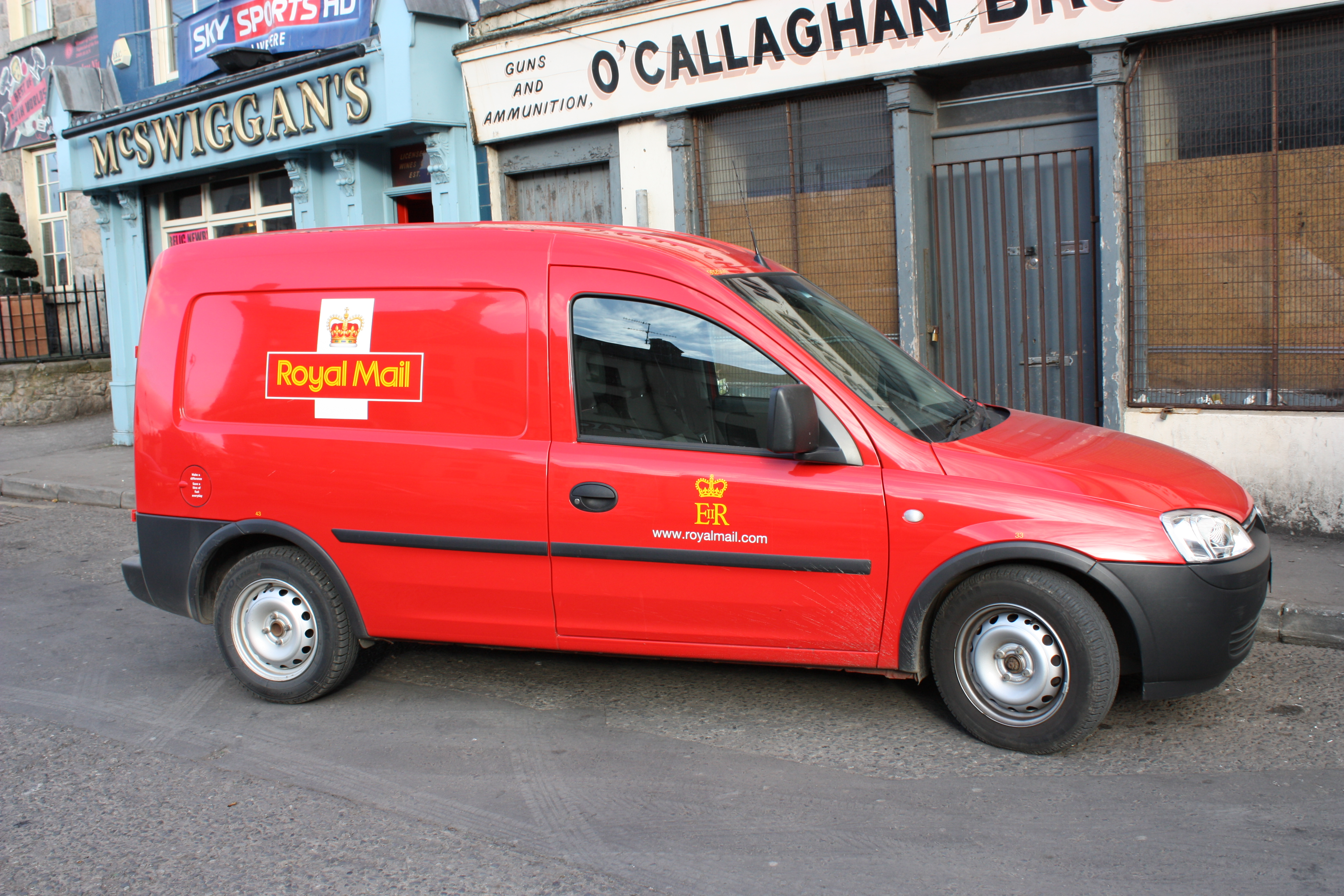
Cypher of Elizabeth II on a Royal Mail van in Northern Ireland

The cypher for Elizabeth II was EIIR, standing for Elizabeth II Regina and was usually surmounted by a stylised version of St. Edward's Crown. Since 1953, new post boxes in Scotland carry only the Crown of Scotland image rather than the EIIR cypher as a result of the Pillar Box War, in which some post boxes carrying the EIIR cypher were vandalised due to objections that there had never been an "Elizabeth I" of Scotland. The EIIR cypher continued to be used on post boxes in the rest of United Kingdom and some other realms and territories. Charles III cypher will also not be included on Scottish post boxes, despite the fact that Charles II also reigned over Scotland.

The production of the cypher was an early step in the preparations for her coronation in 1953 as it had to be embroidered on to the uniforms of the Royal Household and on other articles. Cyphers for other members of the royal family are designed by the College of Arms or Court of the Lord Lyon and are subsequently approved by the monarch.

Queen Elizabeth II's royal cypher, surmounted by St Edward's crown

Queen Elizabeth II's royal cypher, surmounted by the Crown of Scotland

A dual cypher for Elizabeth II and Prince Philip from a 1972 coin marking their 25th wedding anniversary

Royal cypher of Prince Philip, consort of Queen Elizabeth II

== Elsewhere ==
British royal cyphers are still visible on several public buildings and old post boxes in the Republic of Ireland.

Other royal houses have also made use of royal or imperial cyphers; Ottoman sultans had a calligraphic signature known as their tughra. An exception to this is Sultan Abdulhamid II, who wrote the initials of his name in the Latin alphabet, creating a monogram in the form of AH.

All the monarchs of Europe's six other surviving kingdoms use cyphers, with royal crowns above them. King Harald V of Norway used the letter H crossed with the Arabic numeral 5; King Carl XVI Gustav of Sweden uses the letters C and G overlapping with the Roman numeral XVI below them; King Felipe VI of Spain uses the letter F with the Roman numeral; and Frederik X of Denmark uses two letter Fs with the Roman numeral X intertwined. King Philippe of the Belgians uses the letters P and F intertwined, referring to the fact that his name is Philippe in French and Philipp in German, but Filip in Dutch, the three main languages in Belgium. King Willem-Alexander of the Netherlands and his Queen Máxima share a joint cypher consisting of the letter W entwined with the letter M.

The insignia of "N III" for Napoléon III is seen on some Paris bridges, such as the Pont au Change.

The "H7" monogram of Haakon VII of Norway became a symbol of the Norwegian resistance movement in World War II.

King Maha Vajiralongkorn of Thailand uses a cypher made up of his initials in Thai script ("ว.ป.ร." V.P.R. – Vajiralongkorn Parama Rajadhiraj, an equivalent of Vajiralongkorn Rex).

In Malaysia, the state of Johor is the only state which the royal house, the Temenggong dynasty have made use of royal cyphers. The royal cypher is made up of initials S.I., and it's a customary practice for the Temenggong dynasty to name their heir apparent with any names started with the letter I. The practice was started during the Sultan Ibrahim, the second sultan of modern Johor, and it remains until today.

== Gallery ==
=== Commonwealth ===
The royal cypher of Charles III

The royal cypher of Queen Elizabeth II, using St Edward's Crown

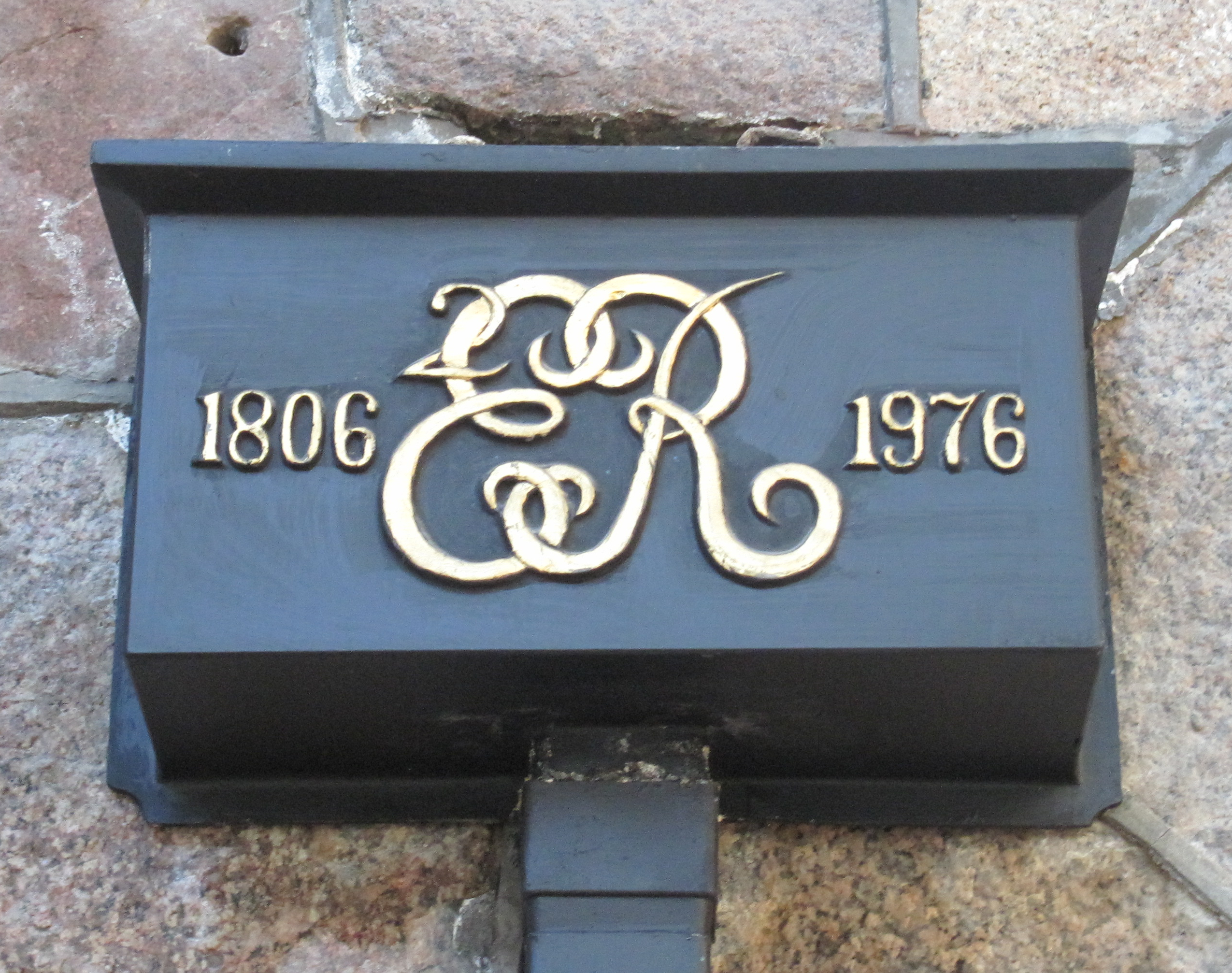
Variant Queen Elizabeth II cypher in Jersey, with Arabic instead of Roman numerals typically employed

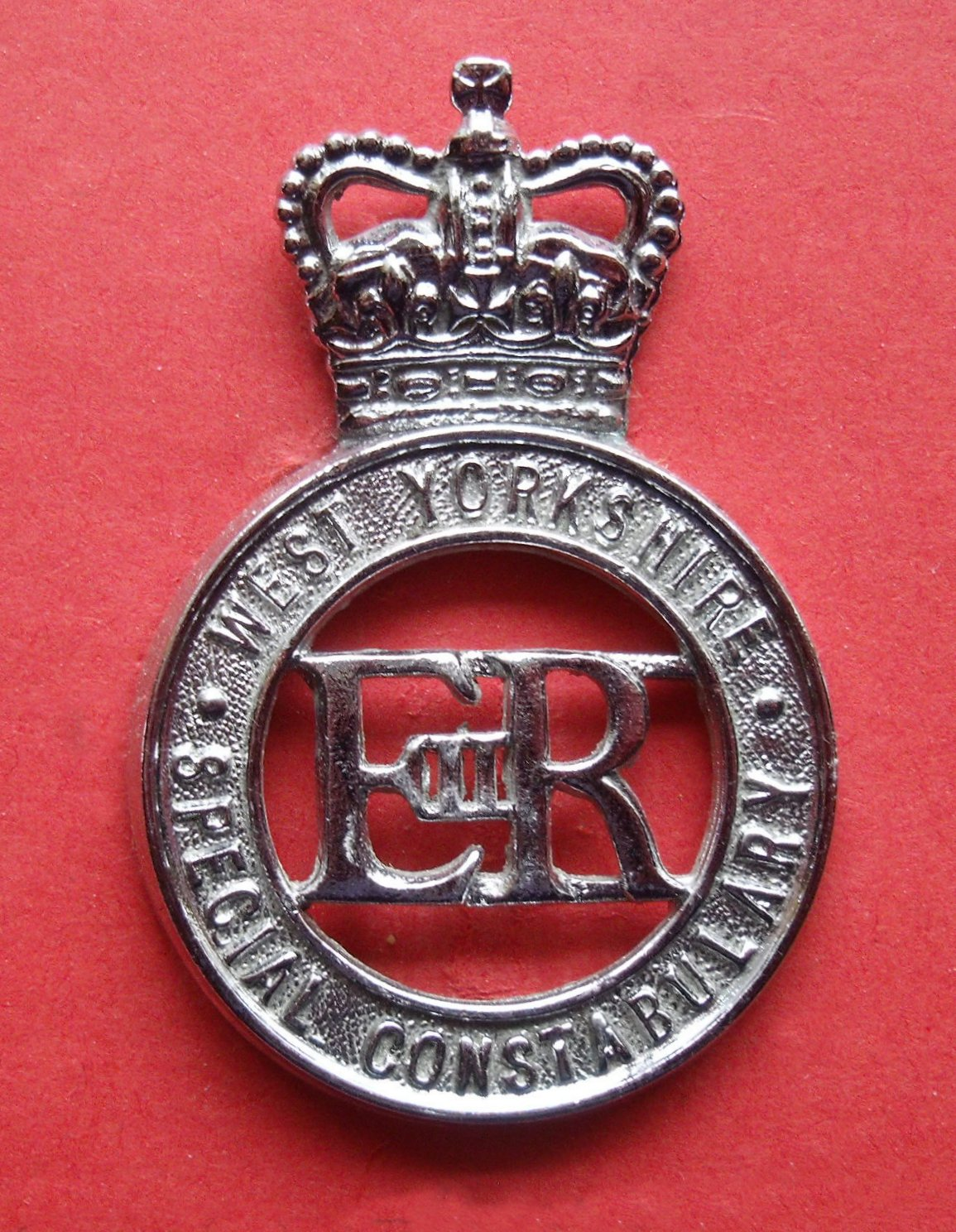
The cypher of Queen Elizabeth II on a police cap or helmet badge

The most common variant of King George VI's cypher

Royal cypher of Queen Elizabeth, consort of King George VI and later The Queen Mother

The royal cypher of King Edward VIII, using the Tudor Crown

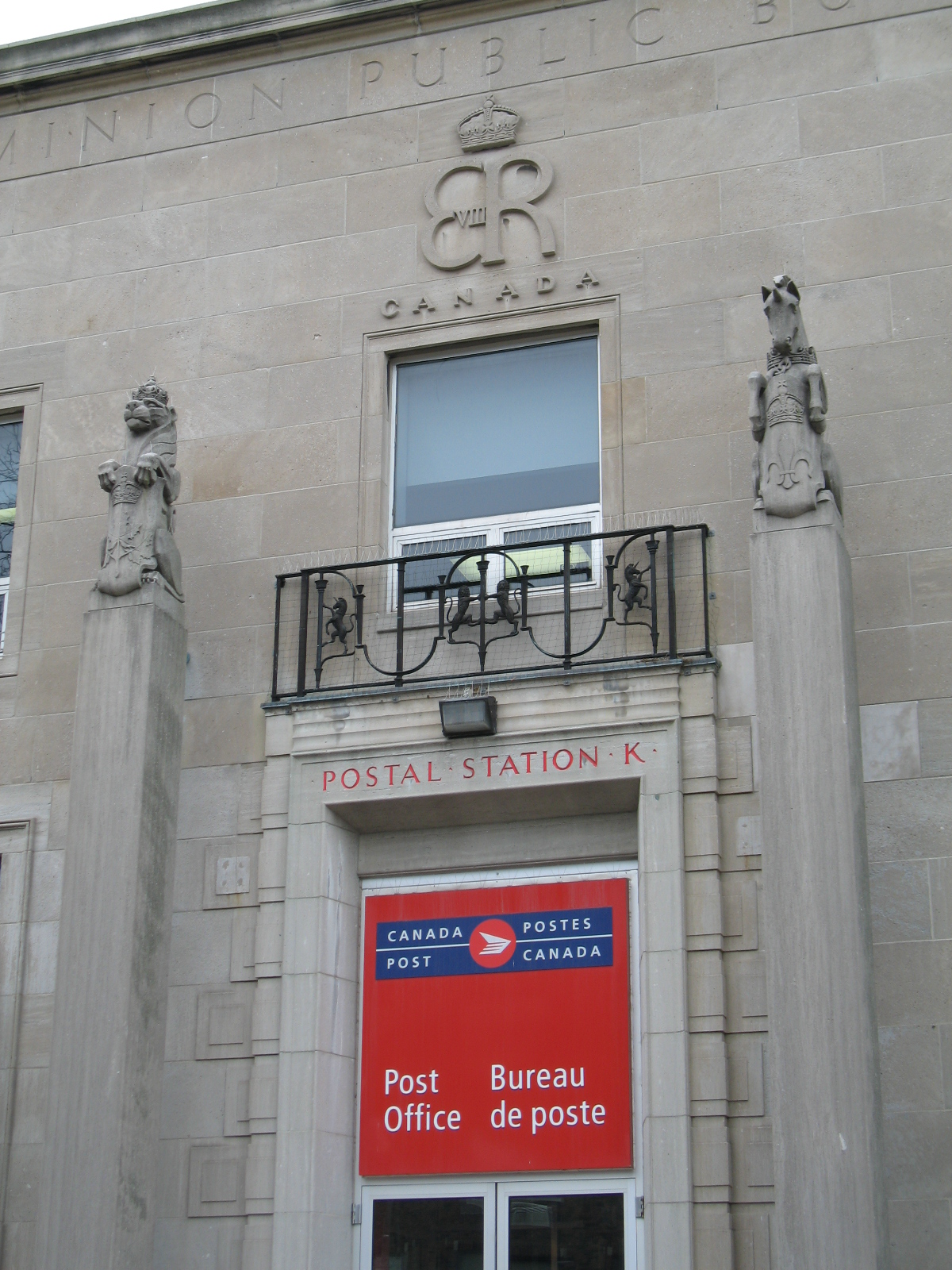
The former Postal Station K in Toronto (pictured in 2006) displays above its main entrance EVIIIR, the royal cypher of King Edward VIII

Royal cypher of King George V, using the Tudor Crown

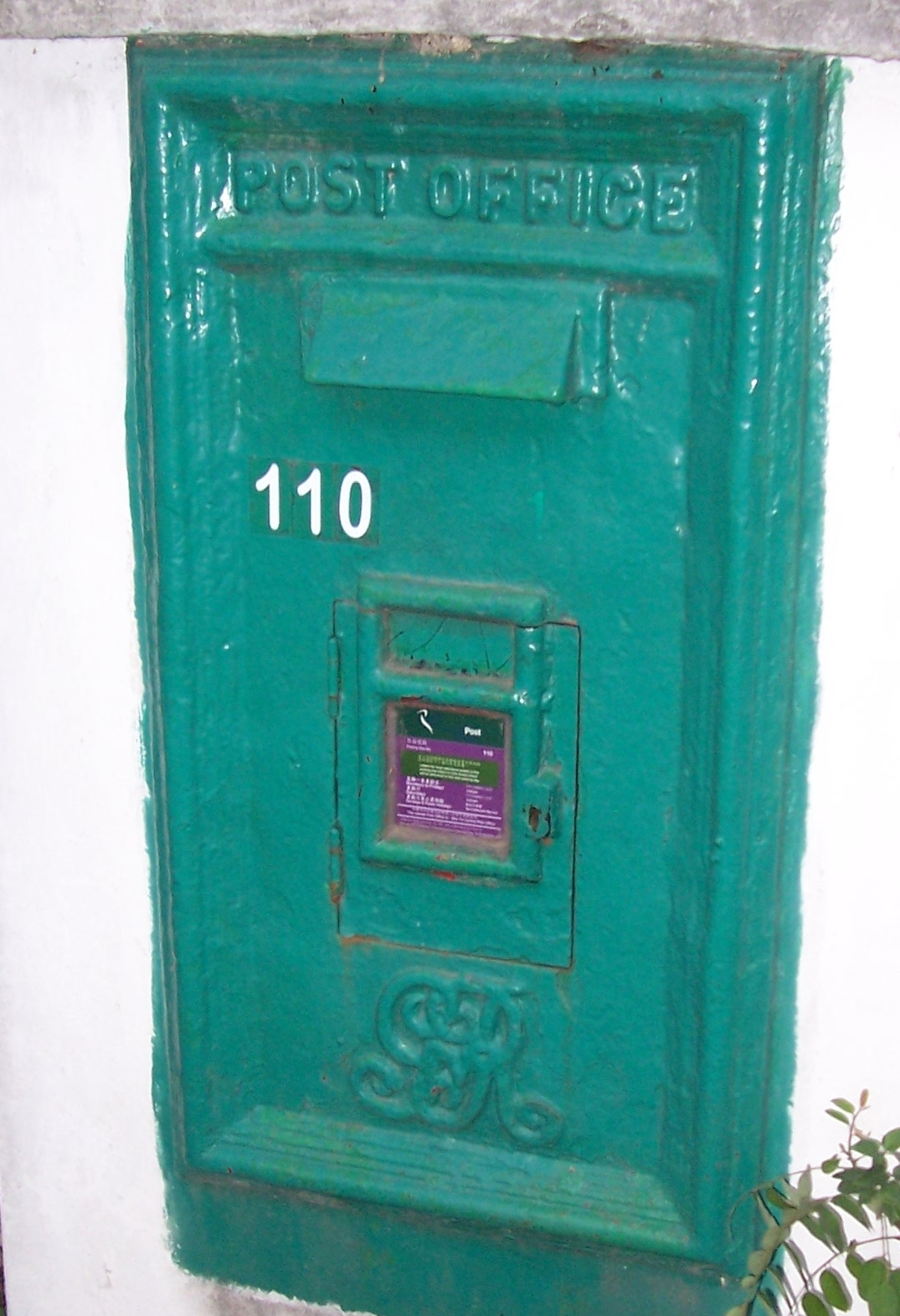
A Hong Kong mailbox with a cypher of King George V

Royal cypher of Queen Mary, consort of King George V

The royal cypher of King Edward VII, using the Tudor Crown

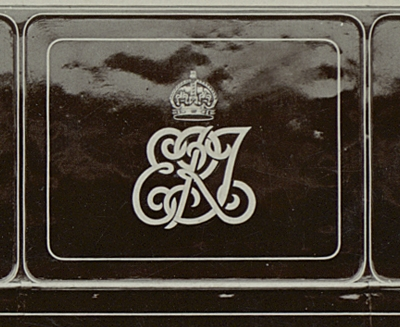
The royal and imperial cypher of King Edward VII, ERI Edwardus Rex Imperator, used on an Indian railway wagon

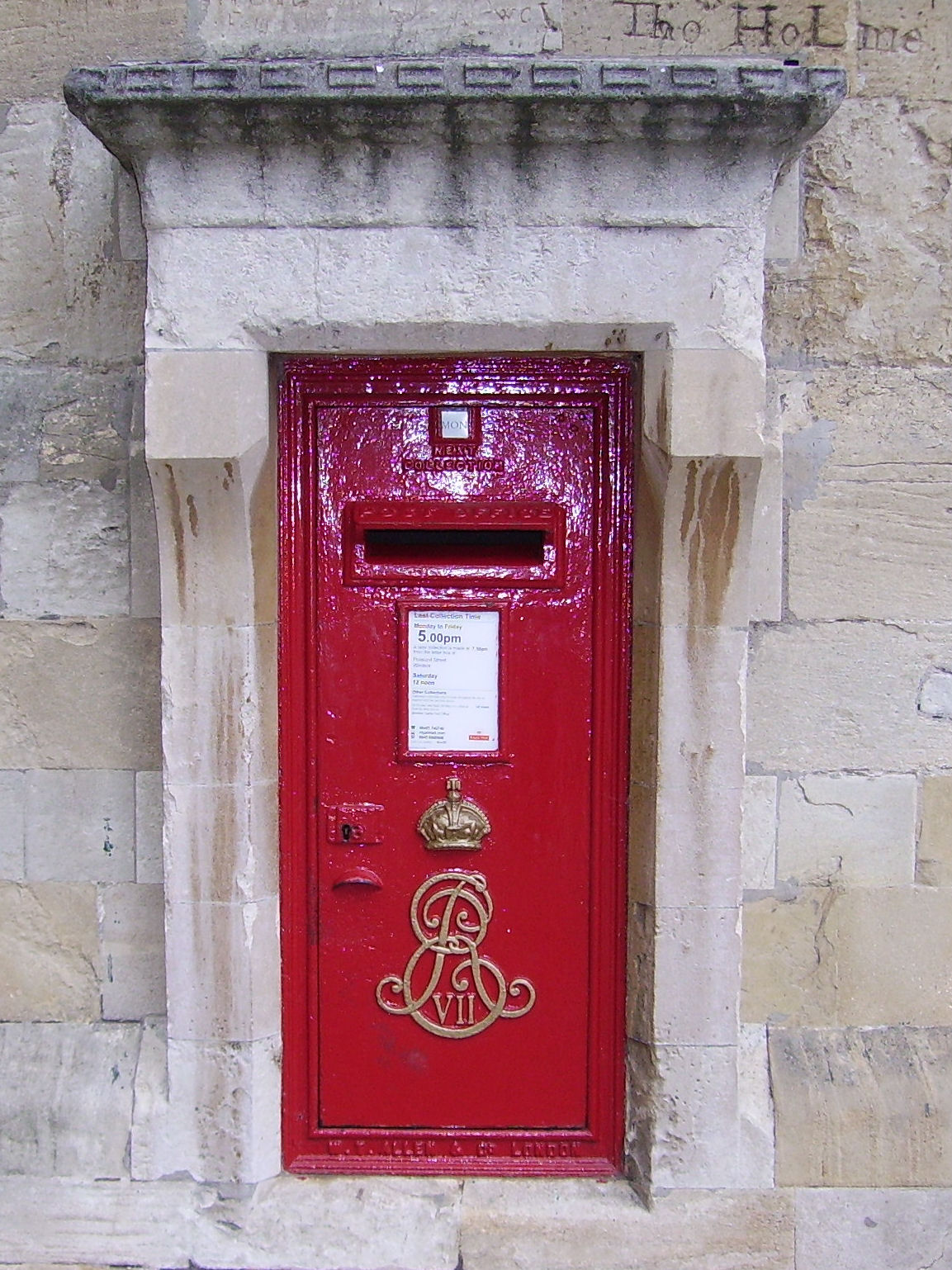
A Royal Mail post box in Windsor in Berkshire bearing the royal cypher of King Edward VII, an intertwined EVIIR

Royal cypher of Queen Alexandra, consort of King Edward VII

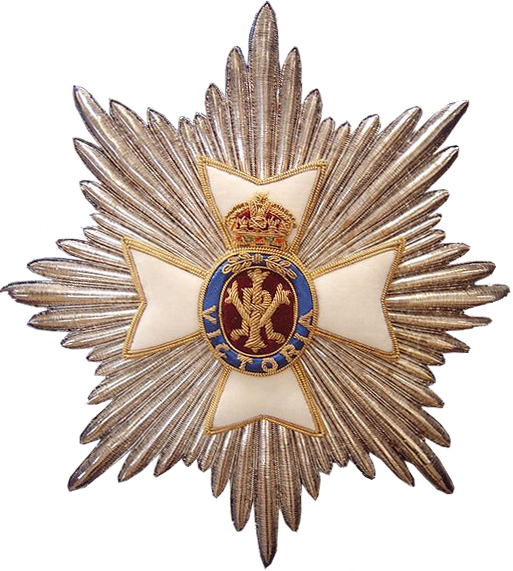
The royal and imperial Cypher of Queen Victoria forms a part of the emblem of the Royal Victorian Order surrounded by a Brunswick star

Royal cypher of Queen Victoria

Royal Cypher of King William IV

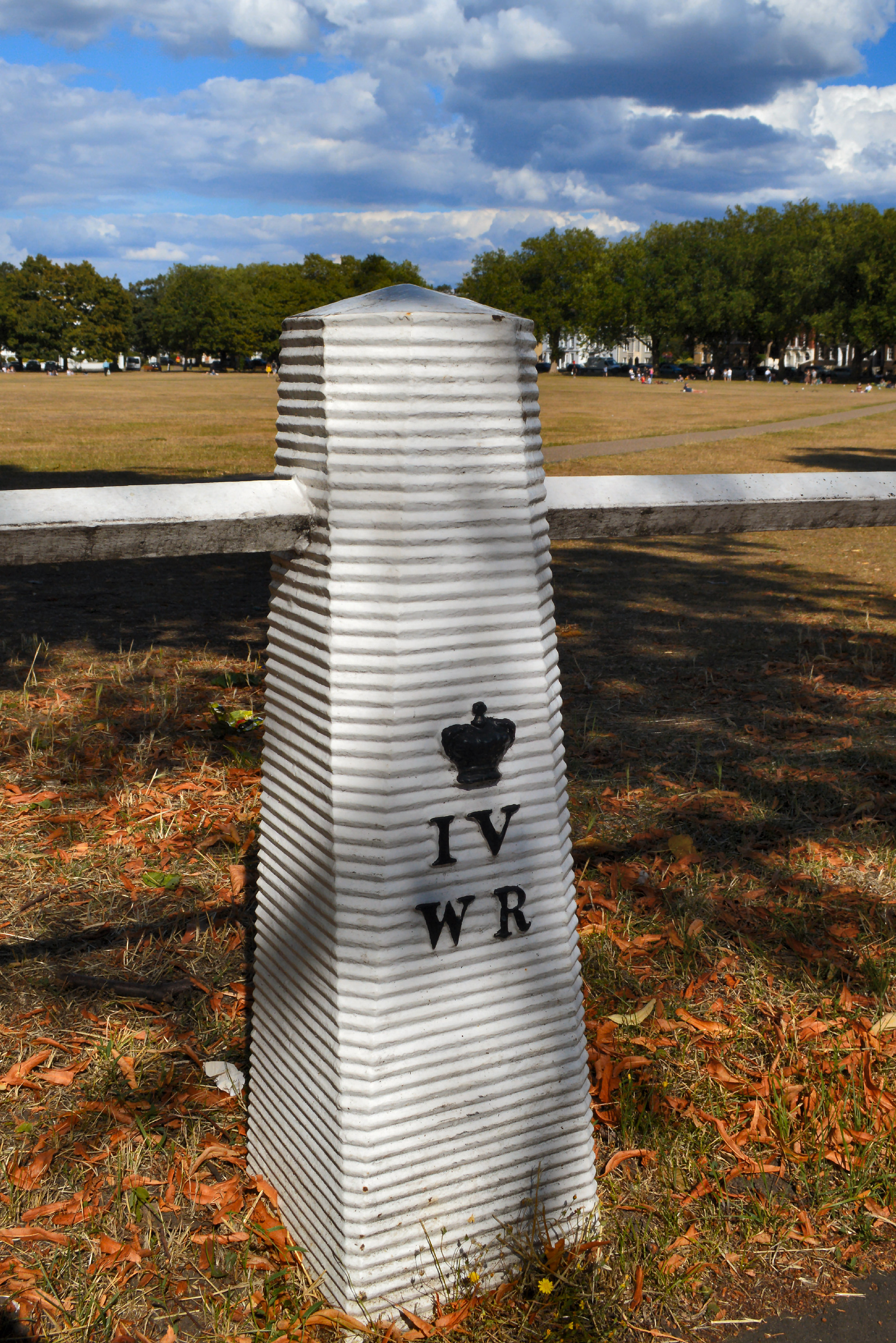
A railing with the royal cypher of King William IV

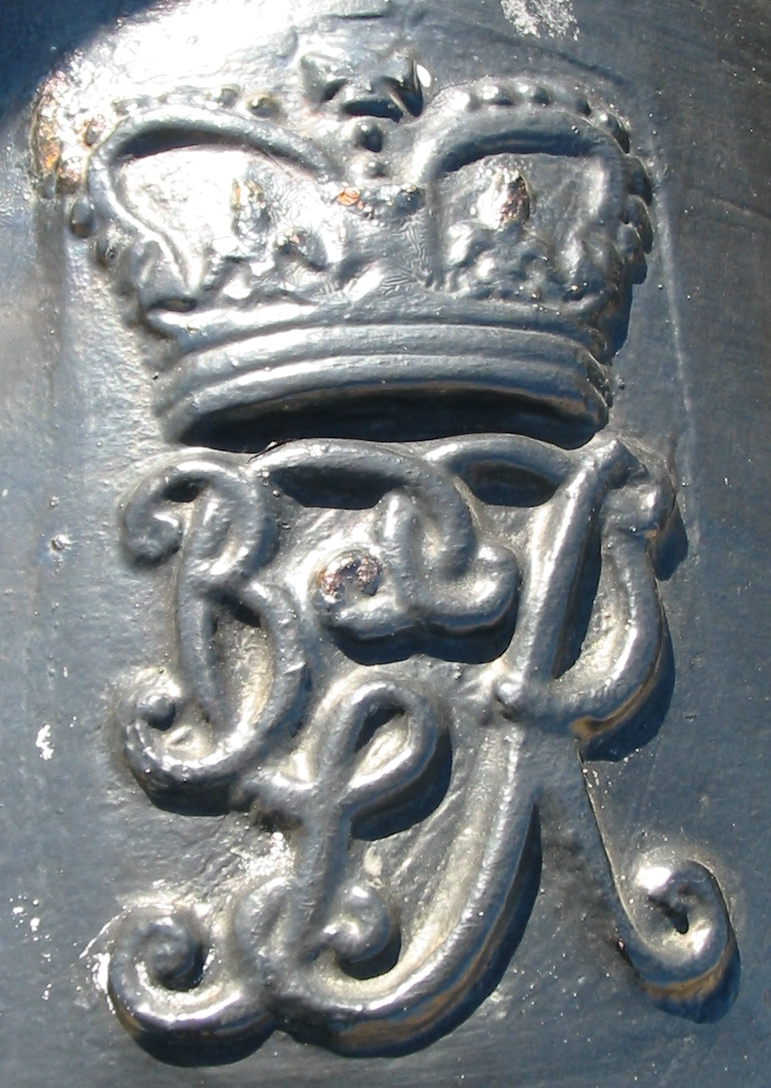
Cypher of George III on a cannon at Elizabeth Castle, Jersey

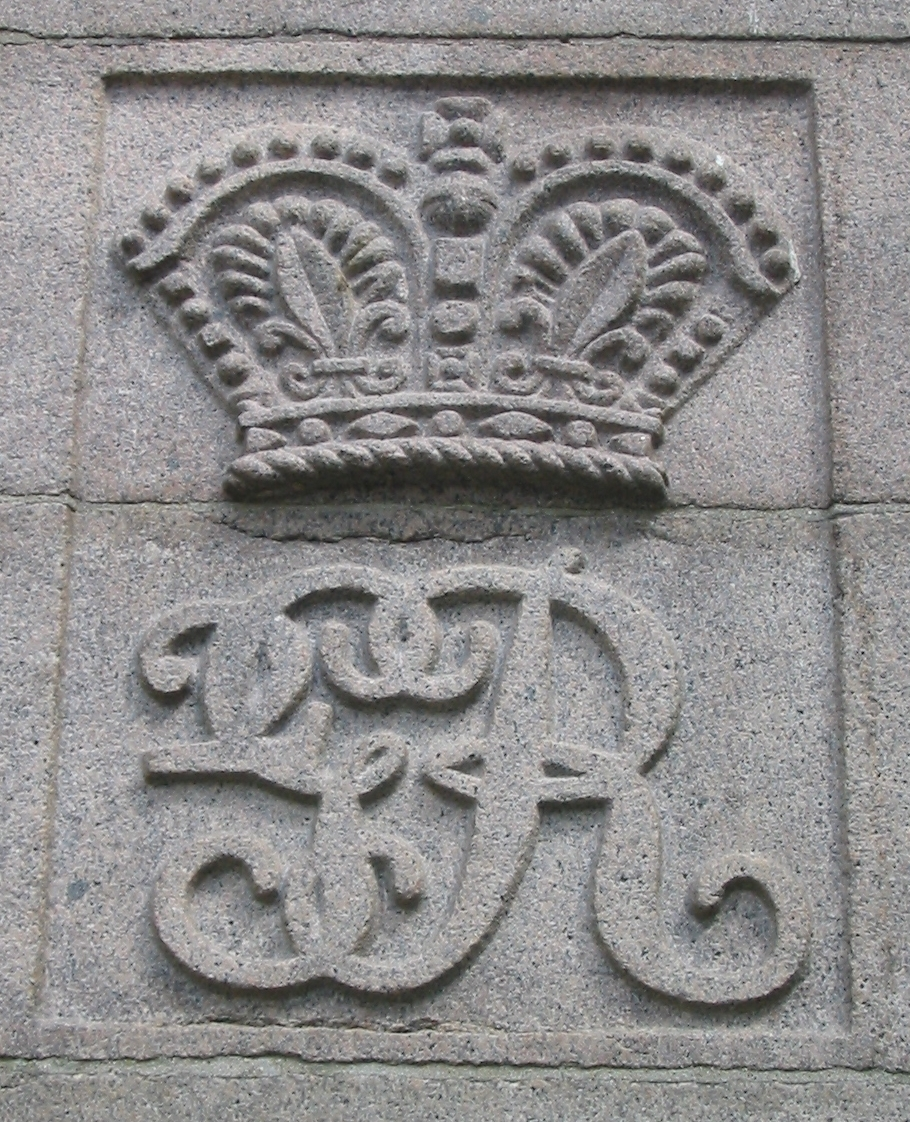
The cypher of King George II of Great Britain and Ireland, employing an Arabic numeral '2'

=== Elsewhere ===
The double-headed eagle, the most recognized emblem of the Byzantine Empire, with the sympilema (dynastic cypher) of the Palaeologi in the centre

Royal monogram of King Stephen I of Hungary

Arms of the Kingdom of Prussia including the cypher of King Friedrich I of Prussia at the centre

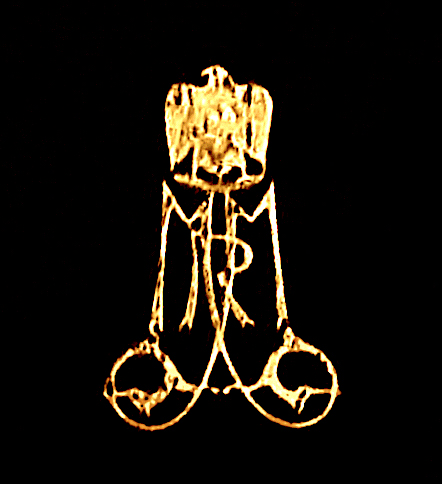
The cypher of Dubai Sovereign H.H. Maktoum bin Rashid Al Maktoum

Cypher of George I of Greece

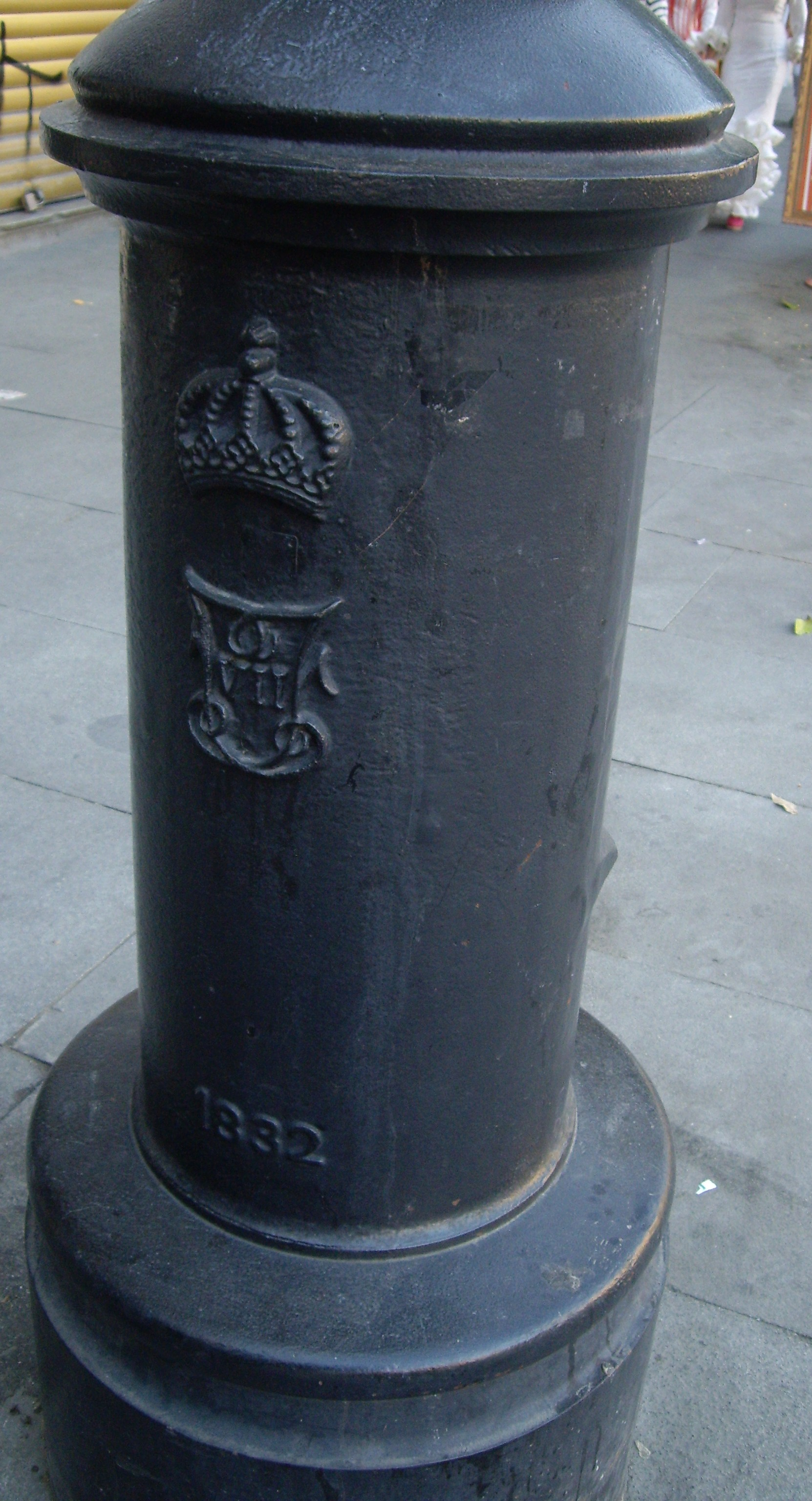
Base of a Spanish style lamp post with the cypher of King Ferdinand VII

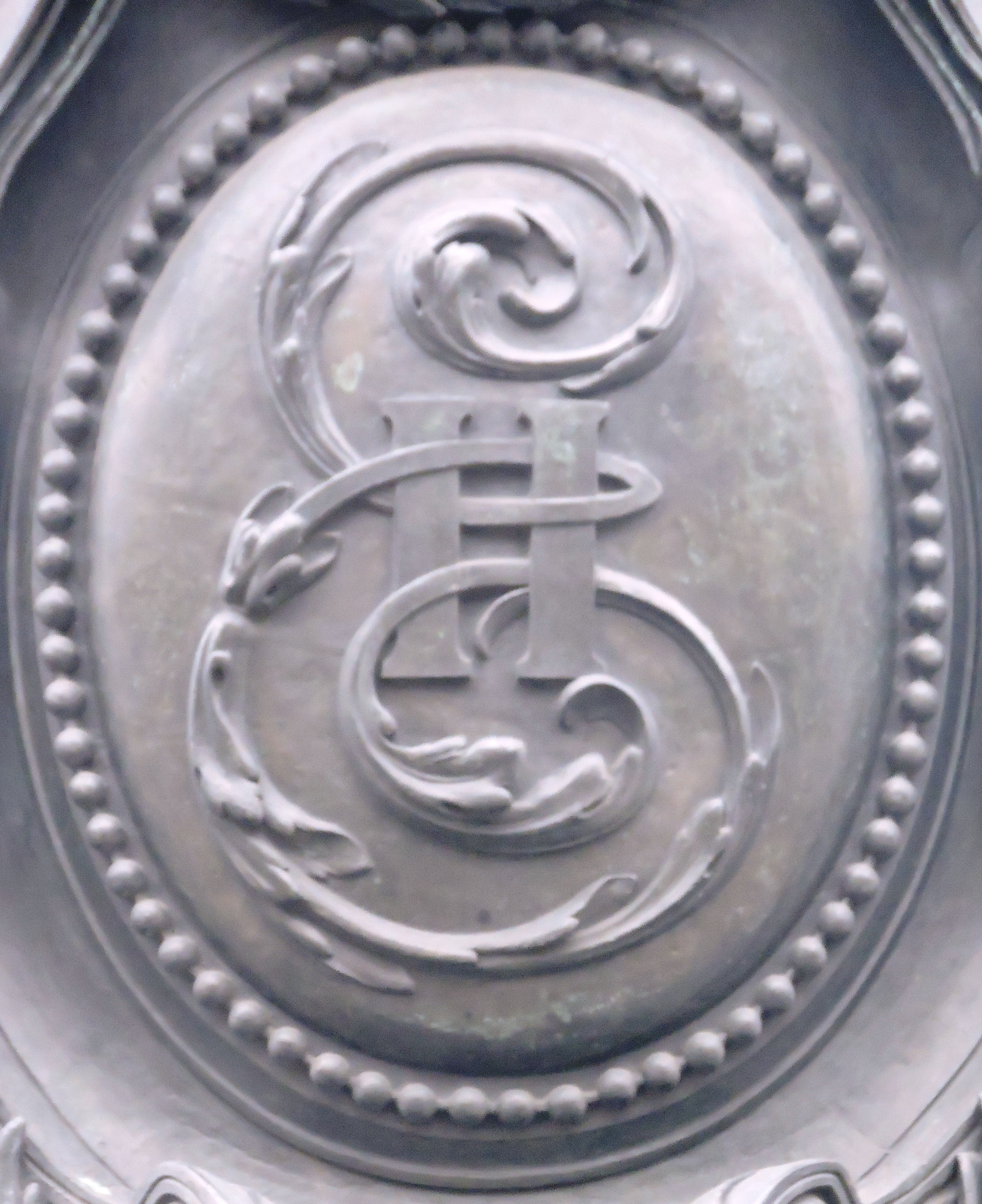
Royal cypher (monogram) of Catherine II of Russia

The monogram of Charles III of Brabant

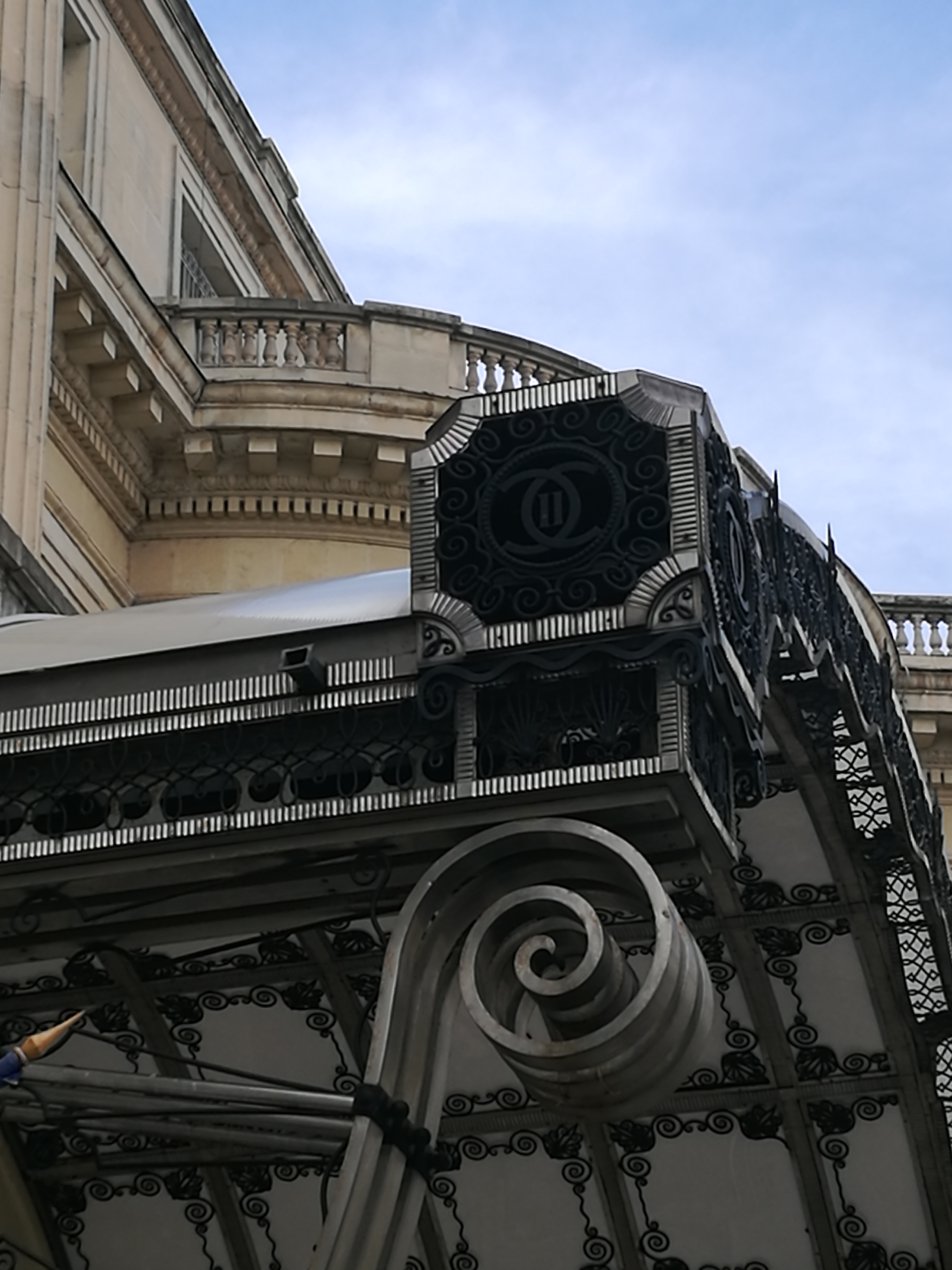
The royal cypher of King Carol II of Romania (two opposed Cs) decorates the porch roofs at the entrances in the Royal Palace of Bucharest.

Royal cypher of King Michael I of Romania

Royal cypher of Margareta of Romania

Royal cypher of King Felipe VI of Spain

Royal cypher of Queen Margrethe II of Denmark

Royal cypher of King Carl XVI Gustaf of Sweden

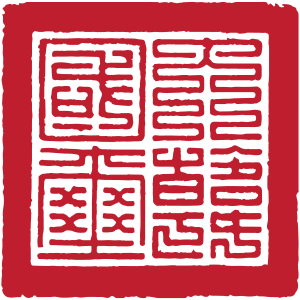
Great Seal of Gojong of Korea

Coat of arms of House of Yi of Korea

Royal cypher of King Harald V of Norway

Royal cypher of Grand Duke Henri of Luxembourg

Royal cypher of Grand Duke Jean of Luxembourg

Royal cypher of King Umberto II of Italy

Royal cypher of King Nicholas I of Montenegro

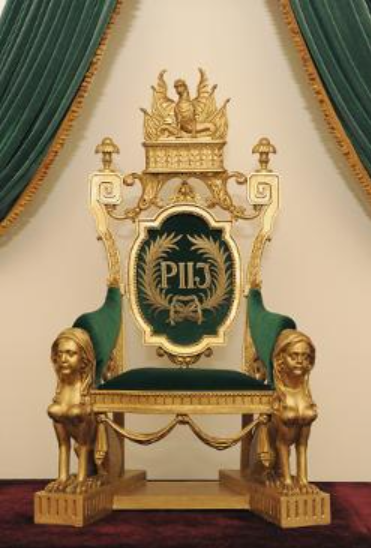
Imperial cypher of Emperor Pedro II of Brazil on his throne. The final character, resembling a "J", is a stylized capital letter "I" standing for Imperador, the Portuguese word for "emperor".

Cypher of Rama IV (Mongkut) of Siam

Cypher of Rama V (Chulalongkorn) of Siam

Cypher of Rama VI (Vajiravudh) of Siam

Cypher of Rama VII (Prajadhipok) of Siam

Cypher of Rama VIII (Ananda Mahidol) of Siam

Cypher of Rama IX (Bhumibol Adulyadej) of Thailand

Personal flag of Rama IX, depicting his cypher on a yellow background

Cypher of Rama X (Vajiralongkorn) of Thailand

Coat of arms of the House of Hamengkubuwono of Yogyakarta

Coat of arms of the Principality of Pakualaman

== See also ==
- Flags of Elizabeth II
- H7 (monogram)
- Heraldic badge
- MacCormick v Lord Advocate
- Mon (emblem)
- Royal sign-manual
- Signum manus
- Tughra
