= Haval H7 (disambiguation) =

The Haval H7 is an automobile nameplate used by the Chinese automobile manufacturer Great Wall Motors since 2015 for several crossover SUV models:

- Haval H7, marketed since 2015
- Haval Big Dog (second generation), marketed since 2023
