= Influenza A virus subtype H7N1 =

Virus classification
- (unranked): Virus
- Realm: Riboviria
- Kingdom: Orthornavirae
- Phylum: Negarnaviricota
- Class: Insthoviricetes
- Order: Articulavirales
- Family: Orthomyxoviridae
- Genus: Alphainfluenzavirus
- Species: Influenza A virus
- Serotype: Influenza A virus subtype H7N1

Virus subtype

H7N1 is a subtype of the species Influenza A virus.

H7N1 was first isolated in 1972, from Eurasian siskin.

A highly pathogenic strain of it caused a flu outbreak with significant spread to numerous farms, resulting in great economic losses in 1999 in Italy in turkeys.
