= Paddy Mahon =

Irish golfer (c.1907–1945)

Personal information
- Full name: Patrick Joseph Mahon
- Nationality: Ireland
- Born: c. 1907 Ireland
- Died: 20 July 1945 (aged 38) Dublin, Ireland

Career
- Sport: Golf
- Status: Professional
- Professional wins: 5

Best results in major championships
- Masters Tournament: DNP
- PGA Championship: DNP
- U.S. Open: DNP
- The Open Championship: T20: 1938

Patrick Joseph Mahon (c. 1907 – 20 July 1945) was an Irish professional golfer. He was one of the leading Irish professionals of the 1930s and had one exceptional season, 1937, where he was runner-up in three important British tournaments, third in another, finished second in the Harry Vardon Trophy standings (the Order of Merit) and won the Irish Professional Championship. He won the Western Isles Open Championship in 1935 and won the Irish Professional Championship again in 1938 and 1939.

Mahon was excluded from consideration for the 1937 Ryder Cup because he was not born in and resident in Great Britain. At the time, the Ryder Cup Deed of Trust required players to be born in and resident in their respective countries. The Deed of Trust used the term Great Britain and, at this time, the PGA decided to take a literal interpretation of the term, excluding those born or living in Ireland. Fred Daly became the first Irish-born Ryder Cup player in 1947.

== Golf career ==
Mahon played in the 1931 Irish Open, scoring 310. At the time he was based at Rathdowney Golf Club.

Mahon first came to prominence when he finished runner-up in the 1932 Irish Professional Championship at Royal Dublin. Joe McCartney, Hugh McNeill and Willie Nolan were tied after three rounds with Mahon one of those four strokes behind. McNeill had his fourth successive round of 76 and Mahon took second place with a 74 while McCartney took 79 and Nolan 81. He had moved to Birr Golf Club by this time. Mahon played in the two international matches later in the year, against England and Scotland.

Mahon was again runner-up in 1933 Irish Professional Championship at Castlerock. He led after three rounds but was beaten by Scot Jimmy Adams. He had a chance to tie Adams but three-putted the final hole.

Mahon had his best finish to date in a major British event in the 1934 Dunlop-Southport Tournament at Southport and Ainsdale Golf Club. Alf Padgham won with a score of 279, Mahon scored 289 and was in a five-way tie for fourth place. He played in the 1934 Open Championship. In the first round he scored 72 to lie tied for 10th place but then had a second round of 82 and missed the cut by a stroke. In late 1934 Mahon moved from Birr to Royal Dublin Golf Club.

In 1935 Mahon had his first big success, winning the Western Isles Open Championship on Islay. He scored 283 to win by four strokes and took the first prize of 150 guineas. Two weeks later he played in the 1935 Open Championship. He again had a good first round of 71 to be tied for 7th but faded and finished tied for 40th place. Domestically he finished third in the Dunlop-Irish Tournament and runner-up in the Irish Professional Championship.

Mahon started 1936 by travelling to London to qualify for the Daily Mail Tournament, which he did comfortably. Returning to Ireland he won the Dunlop-Irish Tournament at Royal Belfast, the following week. Mahon scored 75 and 73 on the opening day and trailed by three from Joe McCartney. Two more 75s on the final day gave him a total of 298 and a three stroke win from McCartney and Willie Nolan. The next week he was back in England for the final stages of the Daily Mail, where he finished tied for 27th, winning £10. Mahon was now playing in nearly all the important British tournaments. He was unlucky not to qualify for the 1936 Open Championship. He scored 73 in his opening qualifying round but heavy rain caused play to be abandoned and the scores were cancelled. On the following two days he then had two rounds of 78 and missed qualifying by one stroke. Mahon was runner-up in the Irish Professional Championship for the fourth time in five years, four behind Joe McCartney. In the Morecambe-Penfold Northern Open Championship he had his best finish in a major event, finishing third behind Percy Alliss and Henry Cotton.

Mahon had an exceptional season in 1937, especially in stroke-play events. He finished tied for third in the Daily Mail Tournament, recovering from a first round 79. He was then second in the Silver King Tournament and tied for sixth in the Dunlop-Southport Tournament. He led the Southend Tournament after 36 holes, an event where the finish was delayed until September, and finished in second place. He tied for sixth place in the French Open before missing the cut in the 1937 Open Championship. He had played in the Open Championship against doctor's orders and later in July he missed the Irish Open. He returned to play in the Irish Professional Championship at Portmarnock in mid-August, winning the event by 10 strokes. Later in the season he tied for 36th in the News Chronicle Tournament and was second in the Dunlop-Metropolitan Tournament.

The team for the 1937 Ryder Cup was selected on 8 June following the conclusion of the Yorkshire Evening News Tournament, a match-play event in which Mahon lost at the last-32 stage. It was reported that the PGA excluded Mahon because he was not born in and resident in Great Britain. The Ryder Cup Deed of Trust had been revised in 1929 to require players to be born in and resident in their respective countries. The Deed of Trust used the term Great Britain and, at this time, the PGA decided to take a literal interpretation of the term, excluding those born or living in Ireland. The American team won the Ryder Cup in late June, their first victory in Britain. When, a week later, Mahon scored 70 in the opening qualifying round of the Open Championship, The Times reported that "Mahon, the little Irishman, who would have been so welcome in our Ryder Cup team, played admirably" while the Glasgow Herald noted that Mahon "would probably have been in the Ryder Cup team but for his Irish Nationality".

Because of the delayed finish, the Southend Tournament marked the final event for the Harry Vardon Trophy competition. The trophy was decided by the average score in 7 leading stroke play tournaments. Henry Cotton did not play the final two rounds at Southend and finished with an average of 72. Charles Whitcombe needed to score 150 in the last two rounds to beat Cotton, while Mahon needed to score 146. On the final day, Whitcombe scored 142 to finish with an average of 71.62 and win the trophy, while Mahon, scoring 145, had a final average of 71.90 to finished second, with Cotton third.

After his successes in 1937, 1938 was a disappointing season. He finished tied for 20th in the Open Championship and retained his Irish Professional Championship. Played at Royal Portrush, Mahon scored 291 to finish 6 strokes ahead of Willie Nolan. Because of his position in the 1937 Harry Vardon Trophy standings, he was invited to play in the Penfold Professional Golf League. However, he won only one of his 11 matches and finished last of the 12 competitors.

In 1939 Mahon won the Irish Professional Championship for the third successive year. He scored 290 on the Bundoran course, 5 strokes ahead of Fred Daly. Mahon finished third in the 1940 Irish Professional Championship, two strokes behind Fred Daly. He led after the first day but faded on the second with rounds of 79 and 80. Mahon continued to play in the Irish Professional Championship, leading after the first day in his final appearance in 1944. Shortly before his death, after more than ten years at Royal Dublin, he became the professional at nearby St Anne's Golf Club.

Mahon was the professional at Royal Dublin when, on 2 August 1943, the clubhouse and adjoining residence, where he and his family lived, were totally destroyed by fire. He escaped with his wife and four young children.

== Death ==
Mahon died of cardiac failure in a Dublin hospital on 20 July 1945, aged 38.

== Professional wins (5) ==
- 1935 Western Isles Open Championship
- 1936 Dunlop-Irish Tournament
- 1937 Irish Professional Championship
- 1938 Irish Professional Championship
- 1939 Irish Professional Championship

== Results in major championships ==
Tournament	1934	1935	1936	1937	1938	1939
The Open Championship	CUT	T44		CUT	T20	CUT

Note: Mahon only played in The Open Championship.

Did not play

CUT = missed the half-way cut
"T" indicates a tie for a place

== Team appearances ==
- England-Ireland Professional Match (representing Ireland): 1932, 1933
- Ireland–Scotland Professional Match (representing Ireland): 1932 (tie), 1933 (winners), 1934 (winners), 1935 (winners), 1936 (winners)
- Triangular Professional Tournament (representing Ireland): 1937
- Llandudno International Golf Trophy (representing Ireland): 1938
