= 1934 Open Championship =

Coordinates: 51.274°N 1.367°E

Tournament information
- Dates: 27–29 June 1934
- Location: Sandwich, England
- Course: Royal St George's Golf Club

Statistics
- Length: 6,776 yards (6,196 m)
- Field: 101 players, 69 after cut
- Cut: 153
- Prize fund: £500
- Winner's share: £100

Champion
- (England) Henry Cotton
- 283

Location in England
Location in Kent. England

The 1934 Open Championship was the 69th Open Championship, held 27–29 June at Royal St George's Golf Club in Sandwich, England. Henry Cotton dominated the championship, leading wire-to-wire on his way to a five-stroke win and his first of three Open titles.

Qualifying took place on 25–26 June, Monday and Tuesday, with 18 holes at St. George's and 18 holes at Royal Cinque Ports, and the top 100 and ties qualified. George Gadd led the qualifiers on 140; Cotton scored a course record 66 in the first round at Royal St George's and 75 at Royal Cinque Ports to be a shot behind on 141. He was joined on 141 by Jimmy Adams and Percy Alliss. The qualifying score was 152 and 101 players advanced.

Cotton opened with 67 on Wednesday to take a three-shot lead over Fred Taggart. Cotton then shot an Open-record 65 in the second round to open up a nine-shot lead over Alf Padgham, while two strokes further back in third were Joe Kirkwood, Denny Shute, and Charles Whitcombe. The top 60 and ties would make the cut and qualify for the final 36 holes; it was at 153 (and better) and 69 advanced.

Conditions were tougher on Friday with a stiff breeze blowing. Cotton scored a third round of 72 in the morning and extended his lead to ten shots over Kirkwood. Scottish amateur Jack McLean had seven threes in his outward nine of 31 and finished with a third round 69, the best third round score. Despite his comfortable lead, Cotton suffered from nerves and began to feel the pressure in the final round that afternoon. He made the turn in 40, then dropped three shots on the next three holes. With Sid Brews scoring 71, Cotton needed a last round of 83 to win. Suddenly it appeared as if his victory was in jeopardy. He managed to get up-and-down on the 13th and steadied himself on his way to a 79 and 283, five strokes ahead of runner-up Brews. His total tied the championship record set by Gene Sarazen two years earlier.

Cotton was the first resident Briton to win the Open Championship since Arthur Havers in 1923. The previous ten had been won by American-born players or residents (Englishman Jim Barnes (1925)). Cotton's win was part of a long period of sustained excellence in the tournament. From 1930 through 1952, he finished in the top-10 in all but one of the Opens he played in. In all, he played in twenty Opens between 1927 and 1958, winning three and finishing in the top-10 in seventeen.

Cotton received the Ryle Memorial Medal, awarded to members of the British P.G.A. winning the Open Championship. He was the first recipient since Arthur Havers in 1923. Living in Belgium, Cotton was not eligible for the Tooting Bec Cup awarded to the British P.G.A. member living in Great Britain scoring the lowest round in the Open Championship. It was won by Bill Davies for his second round of 68.

== Round summaries ==
=== First round ===
Wednesday, 27 June 1934

Place	Player	Score
1	(England) Henry Cotton	67
2	(England) Fred Taggart	70
T3	(France) Marcel Dallemagne	71
T3	(England) Cecil Denny	71
T3	(Wales) Bert Hodson	71
T3	(Scotland) Bill Laidlaw	71
T3	(England) Alf Padgham	71
T3	(United States) Denny Shute	71
T3	(England) Charles Whitcombe	71
T10	(Scotland) Gordon Good	72
T10	(Republic of Ireland) Paddy Mahon	72
T10	(England) Bill Twine	72
T10	(England) Frank Weston	72
T10	(England) Ernest Whitcombe	72

=== Second round ===
Thursday, 28 June 1934

Place	Player	Score
1	(England) Henry Cotton	67-65=132
2	(England) Alf Padgham	71-70=141
T3	(Australia) Joe Kirkwood Sr.	74-69=143
T3	(United States) Denny Shute	71-72=143
T3	(England) Charles Whitcombe	71-72=143
T6	(France) Marcel Dallemagne	71-73=144
T6	(England) Bill Davies	76-68=144
T6	(Republic of Ireland) Willie Nolan	73-71=144
T9	(England) Cecil Denny	71-74=145
T9	(Wales) Bert Hodson	71-74=145

=== Third round ===
Friday, 29 June 1934 (morning)

Place	Player	Score
1	(England) Henry Cotton	67-65-72=204
2	(Australia) Joe Kirkwood Sr.	74-69-71=214
3	(France) Marcel Dallemagne	71-73-71=215
4	(England) Alf Padgham	71-70-75=216
T5	(South Africa) Sid Brews	76-71-70=217
T5	(England) Bill Davies	76-68-73=217
T5	(England) Charles Whitcombe	71-72-74=217
T8	(England) Percy Alliss	73-75-71=219
T8	(Wales) Bert Hodson	71-74-74=219
T8	(Republic of Ireland) Willie Nolan	73-71-75=219
T8	(England) Charlie Ward	76-71-72=219

=== Final round ===
Friday, 29 June 1934 (afternoon)

Place	Player	Score	Money (£)
1	(England) Henry Cotton	67-65-72-79=283	100
2	(South Africa) Sid Brews	76-71-70-71=288	75
3	(England) Alf Padgham	71-70-75-74=290	50
T4	(France) Marcel Dallemagne	71-73-71-77=292	25
T4	(Australia) Joe Kirkwood Sr.	74-69-71-78=292	25
T4	(United States) Macdonald Smith	77-71-72-72=292	25
T7	(Wales) Bert Hodson	71-74-74-76=295	17; 10s
T7	(England) Charles Whitcombe	71-72-74-78=295	17; 10s
T9	(England) Percy Alliss	73-75-71-77=296	12; 10s
T9	(England) Ernest Whitcombe	72-77-73-74=296	12; 10s

Amateurs: McLean (300), Thompson (307), Flaherty (308), Hartley (308),
Garnett (311), Storey (311), Ricardo (313).
