= 1952 Open Championship =

Coordinates: 53.7495°N 3.018°W

Tournament information
- Dates: 9–11 July 1952
- Location: Lytham St Annes, England
- Course: Royal Lytham & St Annes Golf Club

Statistics
- Par: 72
- Length: 6,657 yards (6,087 m)
- Field: 96 players, 46 after cut
- Cut: 151 (+7)
- Prize fund: £1,700 $4,760
- Winner's share: £300 $840

Champion
- (South Africa) Bobby Locke
- 287 (−1)

Location in England
Location in Lancashire. England

The 1952 Open Championship was the 81st Open Championship, held 9–11 July at Royal Lytham & St Annes Golf Club in Lytham St Annes, England. This was the second Open at the course, its first was 26 years earlier in 1926.

Bobby Locke won the third of his four Claret Jugs at 287 (−1), one stroke ahead of runner-up Peter Thomson. This was the first of seven consecutive Opens in which Thomson, age 22, finished as champion or runner-up. Fred Daly, 1947 champion, led after each of the first three rounds, but concluded with 153 (+9) on the final day and finished third.

For qualifying, 274 players entered compared to the 148 the previous year in Northern Ireland. Through an error, the initial entry did not include Antonio Cerdá, the prior year's runner-up. The Championship committee used its discretion to allow him a late entry. Qualifying took place on 7–8 July, Monday and Tuesday, with 18 holes at Royal Lytham & St Annes and 18 holes at adjacent Fairhaven. The number of qualifiers was limited to a maximum of 100, and ties for 100th place were not included. John Panton led at 134 with Harry Bradshaw next on 136. The qualifying score was 152 and 96 players advanced. Three former champions did not continue: Reg Whitcombe (1938) 154, Alf Padgham (1936) 155, and Dick Burton (1939) 156.

The opening round on Wednesday had the lowest scoring, as Daly took the lead at 67, followed by Thomson (68), and Locke in third at 69. Daly widened his lead in the second round on Thursday with 69 for 136. Locke was four behind at 140, with Thomson a stroke behind in third. English amateur Jackie Jones was tied for fourth place, seven shots behind Daly. The maximum number of players making the cut after 36 holes remained at fifty, and ties for 50th place did not make the cut. The cut was at 151 (+7), and 46 players advanced.

Stronger winds arrived on Friday morning for the third round, but Daly still led with 213 after a 77. Locke had closed to one shot after a 74 and Thomson was four behind Locke at 218 (+2), despite going out of bounds at the second hole. Harry Bradshaw and Sam King came next on 219. Starting an hour before Daly, Locke began the final round that afternoon 3-4-3 and reached the turn in 34. Daly was out in 37 and a victory for Locke seemed likely. However he finished with two fives and Daly still had a chance to catch him, but Daly took a six at the 15th; despite finishing 3–4–4, he ended up two shots behind. Thomson seemed to be out of contention after going out in 36, six shots behind Locke at the same stage. However, he came home in 34 with a birdie three at the last to take second place from Daly, one stroke behind Locke. Henry Cotton had the best score on the final day (74-71=145), but had been thirteen behind Daly at 149 after the first two rounds and finished fourth. Jones partnered Locke on the final day and, despite rounds of 78 and 83, held onto the position of leading amateur, winning the silver medal.

Only five Americans were in the field; the top finisher was Willie Goggin, in his first Open Championship at age 46, in a six-way tie for ninth. Gene Sarazen, the 1932 champion, tied for seventeenth at age 50.

== Round summaries ==
=== First round ===
Wednesday, 9 July 1952

Place	Player	Score	To par
1	(Northern Ireland) Fred Daly	67	−5
2	(Australia) Peter Thomson	68	−4
3	(South Africa) Bobby Locke	69	−3
T4	(Republic of Ireland) Harry Bradshaw	70	−2
T4	(England) Bob Garner	70	−2
T4	(England) Arthur Young	70	−2
T7	(Scotland) Eric Brown	71	−1
T7	(United States) Willie Goggin	71	−1
T7	(England) Sam King	71	−1
T7	(Scotland) Alex Kyle (a)	71	−1
T7	(England) Alan Poulton	71	−1

=== Second round ===
Thursday, 10 July 1952

Place	Player	Score	To par
1	(Northern Ireland) Fred Daly	67-69=136	−8
2	(South Africa) Bobby Locke	69-71=140	−4
3	(Australia) Peter Thomson	68-73=141	−3
T4	(Scotland) Eric Brown	71-72=143	−1
T4	(England) Jackie Jones (a)	73-70=143	−1
T6	(England) Peter Alliss	72-72=144	E
T6	(Republic of Ireland) Harry Bradshaw	70-74=144	E
T6	(Scotland) John Panton	72-72=144	E
T6	(England) Syd Scott	75-69=144	E
T10	(England) Ken Bousfield	72-73=145	+1
T10	(France) Henri de Lamaze (a)	71-74=145	+1
T10	(United States) Willie Goggin	71-74=145	+1
T10	(England) Sam King	71-74=145	+1
T10	(England) Alan Poulton	71-74=145	+1

=== Third round ===
Friday, 11 July 1952 (morning)

Place	Player	Score	To par
1	(Northern Ireland) Fred Daly	67-69-77=213	−3
2	(South Africa) Bobby Locke	69-71-74=214	−2
3	(Australia) Peter Thomson	68-73-77=218	+2
T4	(Republic of Ireland) Harry Bradshaw	70-74-75=219	+3
T4	(England) Sam King	71-74-74=219	+3
T6	(England) Fred Bullock	76-72-72=220	+4
T6	(United States) Willie Goggin	71-74-75=220	+4
T6	(England) Syd Scott	75-69-76=220	+4
T6	(Belgium) Flory Van Donck	74-75-71=220	+4
T10	(Scotland) Eric Brown	71-72-78=221	+5
T10	(England) Jackie Jones (a)	73-70-78=221	+5
T10	(England) Alan Poulton	71-74-76=221	+5
T10	(Australia) Norman Von Nida	77-70-74=221	+5

=== Final round ===
Friday, 11 July 1952 (afternoon)

Place	Player	Score	To par	Money (£)
1	(South Africa) Bobby Locke	69-71-74-73=287	−1	300
2	(Australia) Peter Thomson	68-73-77-70=288	E	200
3	(Northern Ireland) Fred Daly	67-69-77-76=289	+1	100
4	(England) Henry Cotton	75-74-74-71=294	+6	75
T5	(Argentina) Antonio Cerdá	73-73-76-73=295	+7	35
T5	(England) Sam King	71-74-74-76=295	+7	35
7	(Belgium) Flory Van Donck	74-75-71-76=296	+8	20
8	(England) Fred Bullock	76-72-72-77=297	+9	20
T9	(Republic of Ireland) Harry Bradshaw	70-74-75-79=298	+10	20
T9	(Scotland) Eric Brown	71-72-78-77=298	+10	20
T9	(United States) Willie Goggin	71-74-75-78=298	+10	20
T9	(England) Arthur Lees	76-72-76-74=298	+10	20
T9	(England) Syd Scott	75-69-76-78=298	+10	20
T9	(Australia) Norman Von Nida	77-70-74-77=298	+10	20

Amateurs: Jones (+16), Rawlinson (+18), Kyle (+19), De Lamaze (+20), Stranahan (+21), Morrell (+26)

In 1952 at Lytham (Royal Lytham & St Annes) Bobby Locke won the championship by one stroke, from Peter Thomson. Australian Norman Von Nida complained to the R&A saying that Locke should be disqualified, or at least given a two-stroke penalty, for playing slowly. They clocked him at three hours and twenty minutes. source https://www.insidegolf.com.au/feature-articles/an-open-discussion-with-peter-thomson/
