= 1937 Open Championship =

Coordinates: 56.497°N 2.717°W

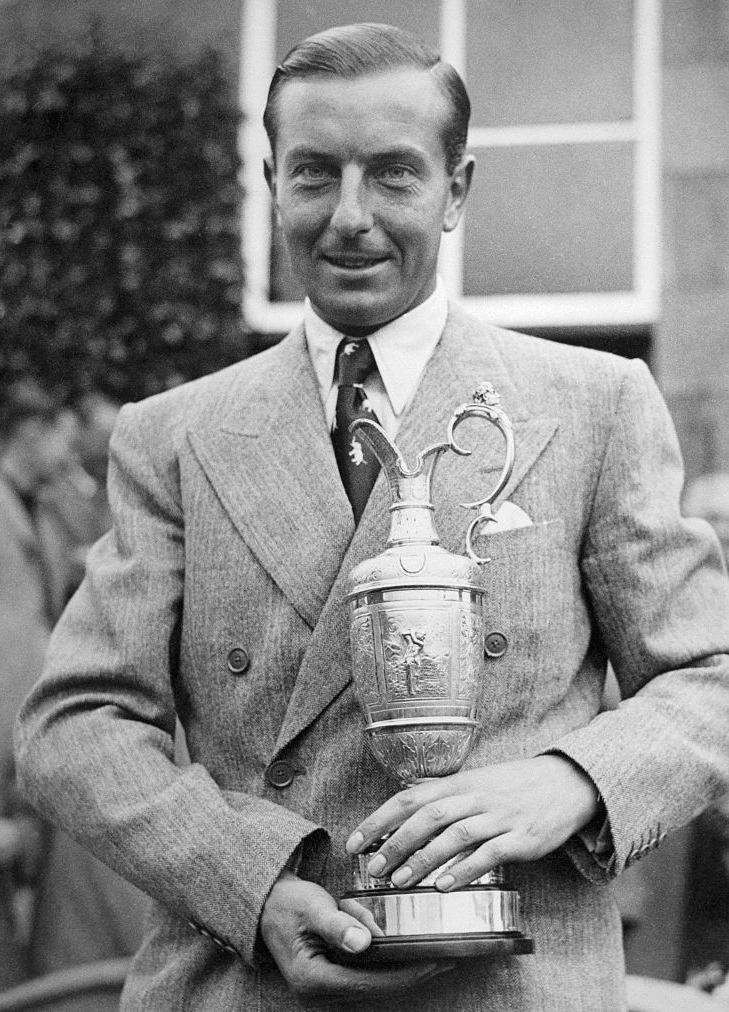

Tournament information
- Dates: 7–9 July 1937
- Location: Carnoustie, Scotland
- Course(s): Carnoustie Golf Links; Medal Course

Statistics
- Par: 72
- Length: 7,200 yards (6,584 m)
- Field: 141 players, 47 after cut
- Cut: 153 (+9)
- Prize fund: £500
- Winner's share: £100

Champion
- (England) Henry Cotton
- 290 (+2)

Location in Scotland
Location in Angus, Scotland

The 1937 Open Championship was the 72nd Open Championship, held 7–9 July at Carnoustie Golf Links in Carnoustie, Scotland. Henry Cotton won the second of his three Open titles, two strokes ahead of runner-up Reg Whitcombe. The Ryder Cup was held in late June at Southport and Ainsdale Golf Club in North West England, and all the members of the victorious American team played in the championship, creating a star-studded field, similar to four years earlier in 1933.

Qualifying took place on 5–6 July, Monday and Tuesday, with 18 holes on the Medal Course (the championship course) and 18 holes on the Burnside Course. The number of qualifiers was increased to the top 140 and ties, having previously been the top 100 and ties. Two-time Masters champion Horton Smith led the qualifiers on 138; the qualifying score was 157 and 141 players advanced, and all the American Ryder Cup players qualified comfortably.

In the opening round on Wednesday, Ed Dudley took the lead with a 70. Reg Whitcombe led after the first two rounds at two-under 142, with his brother Charles and Dudley two behind on 144, and Cotton was tied for fourth at 146. Only the leading forty players and ties made the 36-hole cut, which was at 153 (+9) and 47 advanced. Previously the top sixty and ties made the cut.

The final two rounds on Friday were played in a steady, cold rain. Whitcombe maintained his lead with a third-round 74, two shots ahead of his brother, while Cotton moved up to three behind. The weather proved to be Whitcombe's downfall in the final round; on the 7th tee, his club slipped out of his hands as he was swinging and the ball traveled only 40 yards (37 m). He ended up taking a six and finished with a 76 and 292 total. Cotton did not seem affected by the conditions and arrived at the 18th needing only a six to lead. His approach shot found a greenside bunker, but he was able to get down in five to post a 290 total. Only Charles Whitcombe could catch Cotton, but his 76 and 294 finished four strokes behind in fourth place.

The American contingent included Byron Nelson and Sam Snead, both of whom were making their Open Championship debuts. Nelson finished fifth but played the Open just once more, returning in 1955. Snead tied for eleventh and played in four more, winning his next in 1946 at St. Andrews. The non-playing captain of the U.S. Ryder Cup team, four-time Open champion Walter Hagen, tied for 26th place in his final Open appearance at age 44.

In his last Open Championship as an amateur, nineteen-year-old Bobby Locke was the only amateur to make the cut and tied for seventeenth. As a professional, he won four times (1949, 1950, 1952, 1957).

== Course ==
Medal (Championship) Course

Hole	Name	Yards	Par	Hole	Name	Yards	Par
1	Cup	401	4	10	South America	453	4
2	Gulley	442	4	11	Dyke	368	4
3	Jockie's Burn	346	4	12	Southward Ho	467	4
4	Hillocks	430	4	13	Whins	168	3
5	Brae	388	4	14	Spectacles	473	5
6	Long ^	567	5	15	Lucky Slap	457	4
7	Plantation	389	4	16	Barry Burn	250	3
8	Short	161	3	17	Island	454	4
9	Railway	483	4	18	Home	503	5
Out		3,607	36	In		3,593	36
Source:				Total		7,200	72

^ The 6th hole was renamed Hogan's Alley in 2003

== Round summaries ==
=== First round ===
Wednesday, 7 July 1937

Place	Player	Score	To par
1	(United States) Ed Dudley	70	−2
T2	(England) Bill Branch	72	E
T2	(Scotland) Willie McMinn	72	E
T2	(England) Alf Padgham	72	E
T2	(England) Reg Whitcombe	72	E
T6	(Scotland) Douglas Cairncross	73	+1
T6	(Scotland) Fred Robertson	73	+1
T6	(United States) Denny Shute	73	+1
T6	(England) Jack Taylor	73	+1
T6	(England) Charles Whitcombe	73	+1

=== Second round ===
Thursday, 8 July 1937

Place	Player	Score	To par
1	(England) Reg Whitcombe	72-70=142	−2
T2	(United States) Ed Dudley	70-74=144	E
T2	(England) Charles Whitcombe	73-71=144	E
T4	(England) Henry Cotton	74-72=146	+2
T4	(England) Alf Padgham	72-74=146	+2
T4	(United States) Denny Shute	73-73=146	+2
7	(England) Bill Branch	72-75=147	+3
T8	(United States) Walter Hagen	76-72=148	+4
T8	(England) Arthur Lacey	75-73=148	+4
T8	(South Africa) Bobby Locke (a)	74-74=148	+4
T8	(Wales) Dai Rees	75-73=148	+4
T8	(Scotland) Fred Robertson	73-75=148	+4
T8	(United States) Horton Smith	77-71=148	+4

=== Third round ===
Friday, 9 July 1937 (morning)

Place	Player	Score	To par
1	(England) Reg Whitcombe	72-70-74=216	E
2	(England) Charles Whitcombe	73-71-74=218	+2
3	(England) Henry Cotton	74-72-73=219	+3
4	(England) Bill Branch	72-75-73=220	+4
5	(United States) Charles Lacey	76-75-70=221	+5
T6	(United States) Ed Dudley	70-74-78=222	+6
T6	(Scotland) Bill Laidlaw	77-72-73=222	+6
T6	(United States) Byron Nelson	75-76-71=222	+6
T6	(England) Alf Padgham	72-74-76=222	+6
T6	(United States) Denny Shute	73-73-76=222	+6

=== Final round ===
Friday, 9 July 1937 (afternoon)

Place	Player	Score	To par	Money (£)
1	(England) Henry Cotton	74-72-73-71=290	+2	100
2	(England) Reg Whitcombe	72-70-74-76=292	+4	75
3	(United States) Charles Lacey	76-75-70-72=293	+5	50
4	(England) Charles Whitcombe	73-71-74-76=294	+6	30
5	(United States) Byron Nelson	75-76-71-74=296	+8	25
6	(United States) Ed Dudley	70-74-78-75=297	+9	20
T7	(England) Arthur Lacey	75-73-75-75=298	+10	16
T7	(Scotland) Bill Laidlaw	77-72-73-76=298	+10	16
T7	(England) Alf Padgham	72-74-76-76=298	+10	16
10	(United States) Horton Smith	77-71-79-72=299	+11	10

Amateur: Locke (+16)
