= 1933 Open Championship =

Coordinates: 56.343°N 2.803°W

Tournament information
- Dates: 5–8 July 1933
- Location: St Andrews, Fife, Scotland
- Course: Old Course at St Andrews

Statistics
- Par: 73
- Length: 6,572 yards (6,009 m)
- Field: 117 players, 61 after cut
- Cut: 152 (+6)
- Prize fund: £500
- Winner's share: £100

Champion
- (United States) Denny Shute
- 292 (E), playoff

Location in Scotland
Location in Fife, Scotland

The 1933 Open Championship was the 68th Open Championship, held 5–8 July at the Old Course in St Andrews, Scotland. Denny Shute defeated fellow American Craig Wood by five strokes in a 36-hole Saturday playoff to win his only Open title, the first of his three major championships. The Ryder Cup was held in late June at Southport and Ainsdale Golf Club in North West England, and the members of the American team played in the championship, similar to four years later in 1937.

Qualifying took place on 3–4 July, Monday and Tuesday, with 18 holes on the Old Course and 18 holes on the New Course, and the top 100 and ties qualified. Willie Nolan led the qualifiers with 138; the qualifying score was 158 and 117 players qualified. The leading 60 players and ties after 36 holes made the cut to play on the final day. Walter Hagen led after each of the first two rounds and scores of 152 (+6) and better made the cut.

In pursuit of his twelfth major title, Hagen opened with 68 to take the lead on Wednesday. He held on to it after 36 holes at 140 on Thursday, but then carded 161 (+15) in the final two rounds and fell out of the top twenty.

A group of four players shared the 54-hole lead at 216 (−3) at midday on Friday: Henry Cotton, Abe Mitchell, Syd Easterbrook, and Leo Diegel. Wood began the final round a stroke behind, while Shute was three back at even par. The final round was a disaster for the leaders as Easterbrook shot 77 (+4), while Cotton and Mitchell both carded 79 (+6). Shute and Wood tied for the clubhouse lead with rounds of 73 and 75, respectively. Diegel found the 18th green in two and needed only a two-putt to join the playoff. He left his first putt short, then completely missed the ball on his second attempt. The untimely mistake caused him to miss out on the playoff by a single stroke, as did American Gene Sarazen. In the final round Wood managed to hit a 440-yard (400 m) drive at the 5th, but he found a bunker and lost a stroke on the hole.

During the playoff, Wood opened with a pair of sixes and was four strokes down after two holes. Shute prevailed over Wood in the 36-hole playoff by five shots. Wood lost playoffs at all four major championships before finally winning one, this loss was the first. He won two majors in 1941 at The Masters and U.S. Open.

This was the first playoff at the Open in a dozen years, since 1921, also won by an American at St Andrews; Jock Hutchison (1884–1977) was born in Scotland but became a U.S. citizen the previous year.

The Old Course was par 73 in 1933; the #17 Road Hole was a par-5 through the 1946 Open.

== Card of the course ==
Hole	Name	Yards	Par	Hole	Name	Yards	Par
1	Burn	368	4	10	Tenth ^	312	4
2	Dyke	401	4	11	High (In)	164	3
3	Cartgate (Out)	386	4	12	Heathery (In)	314	4
4	Ginger Beer	427	4	13	Hole O'Cross (In)	410	4
5	Hole O'Cross (Out)	530	5	14	Long	527	5
6	Heathery (Out)	367	4	15	Cartgate (In)	409	4
7	High (Out)	352	4	16	Corner of the Dyke	348	4
8	Short	150	3	17	Road	467	5
9	End	306	4	18	Tom Morris	364	4
Out		3,257	36	In		3,315	37
Source:				Total		6,572	73

^ The 10th hole was posthumously named for Bobby Jones in 1972

== Round summaries ==
=== First round ===
Wednesday, 5 July 1933

Place	Player	Score	To par
1	(United States) Walter Hagen	68	−5
T2	(United States) Ed Dudley	70	−3
T2	(Scotland) Tom Fernie	70	−3
T2	(England) Cyril Tolley (a)	70	−3
T5	Herbert Jolly	71	−2
T5	(Republic of Ireland) Willie Nolan	71	−2
T5	(Scotland) Fred Robertson	71	−2
T8	(England) Archie Compston	72	−1
T8	(United States) George Dunlap (a)	72	−1
T8	(United States) Gene Sarazen	72	−1
T8	(England) Bert Weastell	72	−1

=== Second round ===
Thursday, 6 July 1933

Place	Player	Score	To par
1	(United States) Walter Hagen	68-72=140	−6
2	(United States) Ed Dudley	70-71=141	−5
T3	(England) Abe Mitchell	74-68=142	−4
T3	(Scotland) Fred Robertson	71-71=142	−4
5	(England) Cyril Tolley (a)	70-73=143	−3
T6	(Jersey) Aubrey Boomer	74-70=144	−2
T6	(England) Henry Cotton	73-71=144	−2
T8	(United States) Leo Diegel	75-70=145	−1
T8	(England) Syd Easterbrook	73-72=145	−1
T8	(Australia) Joe Kirkwood Sr.	72-73=145	−1
T8	(United States) Gene Sarazen	72-73=145	−1
T8	(Scotland) Willie Spark	73-72=145	−1

=== Third round ===
Friday, 7 July 1933 (morning)

Place	Player	Score	To par
T1	(England) Henry Cotton	73-71-72=216	−3
T1	(United States) Leo Diegel	75-70-71=216	−3
T1	(England) Syd Easterbrook	73-72-71=216	−3
T1	(Australia) Joe Kirkwood Sr.	72-73-71=216	−3
T1	(England) Abe Mitchell	74-68-74=216	−3
T6	(United States) Ed Dudley	70-71-76=217	−2
T6	(United States) Craig Wood	77-72-68=217	−2
T8	(France) Auguste Boyer	76-72-70=218	−1
T8	(United States) Gene Sarazen	72-73-73=218	−1
T10	(United States) Walter Hagen	68-72-79=219	E
T10	(Scotland) Fred Robertson	71-71-77=219	E
T10	(United States) Denny Shute	73-73-73=219	E
T10	(England) Cyril Tolley (a)	70-73-76=219	E

=== Final round ===
Friday, 7 July 1933 (afternoon)

Place	Player	Score	To par	Money (£)
T1	(United States) Denny Shute	73-73-73-73=292	E	Playoff
T1	(United States) Craig Wood	77-72-68-75=292	E	Playoff
T3	(United States) Leo Diegel	75-70-71-77=293	+1	35
T3	(England) Syd Easterbrook	73-72-71-77=293	+1	35
T3	(United States) Gene Sarazen	72-73-73-75=293	+1	35
6	(United States) Olin Dutra	76-76-70-72=294	+2	20
T7	(England) Henry Cotton	73-71-72-79=295	+3	14
T7	(United States) Ed Dudley	70-71-76-78=295	+3	14
T7	(England) Abe Mitchell	74-68-74-79=295	+3	14
T7	(England) Alf Padgham	74-73-74-74=295	+3	14
T7	(England) Reg Whitcombe	76-75-72-72=295	+3	14

Amateurs: McLean (+6), Tolley (+6), Somerville (+12), Dunlap (+14), Jamieson (+18)

=== Playoff ===
Saturday, 8 July 1933

Place	Player	Score	To par	Money (£)
1	(United States) Denny Shute	75-74=149	+3	100
2	(United States) Craig Wood	78-76=154	+8	75

==== Scorecards ====
Morning round

Hole	1	2	3	4	5	6	7	8	9	Out	10	11	12	13	14	15	16	17	18	Back	Total
(United States) Shute	4	4	4	4	4	4	5	4	3	36	4	5	4	5	4	4	4	5	4	39	75
(United States) Wood	6	6	4	5	4	3	5	3	3	39	4	5	4	4	5	5	4	4	4	39	78

Afternoon round

Hole	1	2	3	4	5	6	7	8	9	Out	10	11	12	13	14	15	16	17	18	Back	Total
(United States) Shute	4	4	4	5	4	4	4	3	4	36	3	3	5	4	5	5	4	5	4	38	74
(United States) Wood	4	5	4	4	4	4	6	4	4	39	3	4	4	5	4	4	4	5	4	37	76

Eagle	Birdie	Bogey	Double bogey	Triple bogey+
