= Arthur Lacey =

English professional golfer

Personal information
- Full name: Arthur James Lacey
- Nationality: England
- Born: 20 May 1904 Burnham, Buckinghamshire, England
- Died: 6 August 1979 (aged 75) Pinehurst, North Carolina, U.S.

Career
- Sport: Golf
- Status: Professional
- Professional wins: 6

Best results in major championships
- Masters Tournament: DNP
- PGA Championship: DNP
- U.S. Open: DNP
- The Open Championship: T7: 1932, 1937

Arthur James Lacey (20 May 1904 – 6 August 1979) was an English professional golfer who finished in the top ten of The Open Championship on four occasions in the 1930s. He also played in the 1933 and 1937 Ryder Cup matches, and was then selected as non-playing captain of the Great Britain and Ireland side for those matches in 1951. He was chairman of the PGA from 1949 to 1951.

== Early life and amateur career ==
Lacey was the son of another Arthur Lacey, the greenkeeper at Burnham Beeches Golf Club in Buckinghamshire. Arthur, senior was also a golfer, winning the first competition of the Golf Greenkeepers' Association at Bushey Hall Golf Club in 1912 with scores of 80 and 79. Arthur senior later moved to Ifield, West Sussex.

Lacey also had a younger brother named Charles Lacey. He was also a successful golfer.

== Professional career ==
Lacey's most notable victories as a player came in the Belgian Open of 1931 and 1932, and the French Open in 1932, and he continued to be a regular high finisher in British professional events in the 1930s. 1937 was his most successful year winning the Yorkshire Evening News and Dunlop-Metropolitan tournaments and finishing seventh in The Open Championship, behind winner Henry Cotton but ahead of several of that year's American Ryder Cup side, including major champions Horton Smith, Ralph Guldahl, Sam Snead and Denny Shute.

Lacey was professional at The Berkshire Golf Club in Ascot, Berkshire from 1934 to 1952 having previously been at Selsdon Park (1928 to 1933), Leighton Buzzard Golf Club (1927 to 1928), and an assistant at Gerrards Cross Golf Club.

Lacey also served as a rules official, and in that capacity was involved in a controversial ruling during the final round of the 1958 Masters Tournament. He allowed Arnold Palmer, who was in strong contention, to play two balls when Palmer's tee shot plugged in wet turf on the 12th hole. Palmer's original attempt from the plugged lie gave him a double bogey, while he made a par with his second ball after taking a free drop, which he had had to argue with Lacey to obtain. Palmer's actual score on the hole would be decided after further discussion. Bobby Jones ruled half an hour later that Palmer's par would count, and Palmer went on to win, ahead of a bitter Ken Venturi, who as Palmer's playing partner lost his composure when Palmer received the favourable ruling. The incident has been debated heavily in golf circles ever since.

== Professional wins ==
this list may be incomplete

- 1931 Belgian Open
- 1932 Belgian Open, French Open
- 1933 Yorkshire Evening News Tournament
- 1937 Yorkshire Evening News Tournament, Dunlop-Metropolitan Tournament

== Results in major championships ==
Tournament	1927	1928	1929
The Open Championship	T46	T31	CUT

Tournament	1930	1931	1932	1933	1934	1935	1936	1937	1938	1939
The Open Championship	T24	9	T7			T23	T8	T7	17	CUT

Tournament	1940	1941	1942	1943	1944	1945	1946	1947	1948	1949
The Open Championship	NT	NT	NT	NT	NT	NT			CUT	T20

Tournament	1950	1951
The Open Championship		T40

Note: Lacey only played in The Open Championship.

Top 10
Did not play

NT = No tournament
CUT = missed the half-way cut
"T" indicates a tie for a place

== Team appearances ==
- Ryder Cup (representing Great Britain): 1933 (winners), 1937, 1951 (non-playing captain)
- Seniors vs Juniors (representing the Juniors): 1928
- England–Scotland Professional Match (representing England): 1932 (winners), 1933 (winners), 1934 (winners), 1936 (winners), 1937 (winners), 1938 (winners)
- England–Ireland Professional Match (representing England): 1932 (winners), 1933 (winners)
- Coronation Match (representing the Ladies and Professionals): 1937
- Llandudno International Golf Trophy (representing England): 1938 (winners)
- Great Britain–Argentina Professional Match (representing Great Britain): 1939 (winners, captain)
