= Northern Professional Championship =

Tournament information
- Location: Northern England
- Established: 1920

The Northern Professional Championship was a professional golf tournament played in Northern England. The event was generally a regional tournament but between 1923 and 1927 and in 1936 it was an open event with significant prize money.

The event was started in 1920 by the Northern section of the PGA with entry restricted to members of that section. In 1923 the Championship became a national event; the Championship being extended to 72 holes with £350 in prize money under the sponsorship of the Manchester Daily Dispatch. In 1925 the prize money was increased to £1000 with £350 for the winner. In early 1928 the Daily Dispatch withdrew their support for the championship which had been planned for Birkdale in July. The tournament did take place but it reverted to an event for the professionals in the Northern section of the PGA. In 1936 the event again became an open tournament called the Morecambe-Penfold Northern Open Championship with prize money of £750. However, this sponsorship only lasted for one event and the championship again became a closed tournament.

== History ==
The first Championship was held in 1920 at the Manchester Golf Club, Hopwood Park. It was a 36-hole medal event and was won by Thomas Renouf after a playoff. The winner received the "Manchester Guardian Cup" and the total prize money was £40. The second event was held at Alwoodley Golf Club, Leeds and was won by Arthur Havers, again after a playoff. In 1922 Havers retained the Championship at Blackpool.

The 1928 Championship was held at Birkdale Golf Club and was won by Bill Large, Sr. Thomas Renouf, 1920 champion, regained the title in 1929 at Pleasington Golf Club, Blackburn. the 1930 event was held at Brancepeth Castle Golf Club, Durham and was won by local professional Charles Gadd, brother of George, the 1924 and 1926 champion. The event returned to Lytham in 1931 and was won by Bill Davies, a runner-up in 1926 and 1927. Philip Rodgers won in 1932 at Furness Golf Club while Cyril Fryer won in 1933 at Fleetwood Golf Club. Dick Burton won in 1934, played again at Fleetwood Golf Club while Bill Davies, 1931 winner, regained the title in 1935 at Moortown Golf Club.

In 1936 the Championship was an open event called the Morecambe-Penfold Northern Open Championship. It was played at Heysham Golf Club from 9–11 September with prize money of £750. The Times reported that "much of the old prestige has returned to the Northern Professional Championship, which has been thrown open, as in the days when famous players were among the winners". There were 18 holes on the first two days after which the leading 60 played 36 holes on the final day. After the first day Tom Pierpoint led after a 68 with Ted Jarman a stroke behind. After two rounds Jarman led on 139 with four players on 142. Pierpoint faded after a 77. On the final day Jarman scored 74 and 79 to drop well down the leaderboard. Percy Alliss scored 68 and a course record 67 to win by 5 shots from Henry Cotton with Paddy Mahon a further shot behind.

Percy Alliss retained the title in 1937 at Mere Golf and Country Club in Cheshire. The event was held in conjunction with the Leeds Cup, the winner of which was based on the first 36 holes. The Championship was not contested in 1938 and 1939 but was contested again in 1946 using the same format as in 1937. Norman Sutton won the championship, having won the Leeds Cup the previous day. In 1947 the Championship was reduced to 36 holes and was combined with the Leeds Cup. Eric Green beat Frank Jowle after a 36-hole playoff. In 1948 the events were again separated with the Leeds Cup being used for the qualifying for the Daily Mail Tournament, the Northern Professional Championship remaining as a 36-hole event for the News of the World Matchplay qualifying. It was held at North Manchester, Alf Perry winning by 8 strokes. The same system was used in 1949. Norman Quigley won the event, played at Fulford. In 1950 at Stand, John Fallon won after beating John Burton in a playoff.

== Winners ==
This table only gives details from 1923 to 1927 and in 1936 when the Championship was an open event.

Year	Winner	Country	Venue	Score	Margin of victory	Runner(s)-up	Winner's share (£)	Ref
Daily Dispatch Northern Professional Championship
1923	Gene Sarazen	United States	Lytham & St Annes Golf Club	290	2 strokes	(United States) Walter Hagen	100	
1924	George Gadd	England	Wilmslow Golf Club	287	3 strokes	(England) Frank Ball (England) Albert Hallam	100	
1925	Abe Mitchell	England	Lytham & St Annes Golf Club	305	2 strokes	(England) Tom Walton	350	
1926	George Gadd	England	Formby Golf Club	296	3 strokes	(England) Bill Davies (United States) Bill Mehlhorn (England) Ernest Whitcombe	350	
1927	Charles Whitcombe	England	Blackpool Golf Club	280	6 strokes	(England) Bill Davies	350	
Morecambe-Penfold Northern Open Championship
1936	Percy Alliss	England	Heysham Golf Club	277	5 strokes	(England) Henry Cotton		
