= Western Isles Open Championship =

Golf tournament

Tournament information
- Location: Islay, Hebrides, Scotland
- Established: 1935
- Course(s): Machrie golf course
- Final year: 1935

Final champion
- Paddy Mahon

The Western Isles Open Championship was a professional golf tournament played at Machrie golf course on Islay, Hebrides, Scotland from 11 to 13 June 1935. Total prize money was over £500, which included plate prizes for the leading amateurs. The event was sponsored by David MacBrayne Ltd, the local shipping company and was intended to advertise the Western Isles as a golfing holiday destination. The event was held the week before the inaugural Scottish Open Championship at Gleneagles and two weeks before the Open Championship at Muirfield.

A number of the entrants failed to turn up and about 30 golfers contested the event. The field included a number of English professionals including Bill Branch, Tom Collinge, Archie Compston, Bill Davies, Ted Jarman and Mark Seymour, two Irish professionals, Paddy Mahon and Willie Nolan, and the Spaniard, Ángel de la Torre.

Paddy Mahon scored 72 in the opening round to lead by a stroke. Jimmy McDowall scored 69 in the second round to lead by two. On the final day Mahon scored 70 and 68 to win by four strokes. Four professionals tied for second place with Mark Seymour a further stroke behind. Seymour had rounds of 68 and 67 on the final day. Two Scottish amateurs, Hector Thomson and Dick Walker tied as leading amateurs, scoring 290. They played an 18-hole playoff in the evening, which Thomson won by a score of 73 to Walker's 74.

The event was intended to be an annual event. A second tournament was planned for 1936 but was cancelled because no suitable date was found. The organisers planned to try again in June 1937 but this event did not take place either.

== Winners ==
Year	Winners	Country	Venue	Score	Margin of victory	Runners-up	Winner's share (£)	Ref
1935	Paddy Mahon	Ireland	Machrie golf course	283	4 strokes	(England) Bill Branch (England) Tom Collinge (England) Bill Davies (Republic of Ireland) Willie Nolan	157; 10s	
