= 1932 Open Championship =

Coordinates: 51.296°N 1.37°E

Tournament information
- Dates: 8–10 June 1932
- Location: Sandwich, England
- Course: Prince's Golf Club

Statistics
- Par: 72
- Length: 6,860 yards (6,273 m)
- Field: 110 players, 64 after cut
- Cut: 154 (+10)
- Prize fund: £500
- Winner's share: £100

Champion
- (United States) Gene Sarazen
- 283 (−5)

Location in England
Location in Kent, England

The 1932 Open Championship was the 67th Open Championship, held 8–10 June at Prince's Golf Club in Sandwich, England. Gene Sarazen won his only Open title, five strokes ahead of runner-up Macdonald Smith. Sarazen led wire-to-wire to secure the fifth of his seven major championships.

Qualifying took place on 6–7 June, Monday and Tuesday, with 18 holes at Prince's and 18 holes at Royal St George's, and the top 100 and ties qualified. Bob Bradbeer led the qualifiers on 141; the qualifying score was 157 and 110 players advanced.

Sarazen opened with a 70 on Wednesday to take the lead, one stroke ahead of four others. He followed with a 69 for 139 (−5) for a three-stroke lead over Percy Alliss after 36 holes. The top sixty and ties would make the 36-hole cut; it was at 154 (+10) and 64 players advanced.

With a 70 in the third round on Friday morning, Sarazen increased his lead to four over Arthur Havers, who shot a course-record 68 (−4). A 74 in the final round that afternoon saw Sarazen post an Open record 283 total. Havers, playing well behind Sarazen, needed a 69 to win, but made the turn in 37 and could not close the gap. He could only manage a 76 for 289 and fell to third; Smith shot 71-70 to climb into solo second place at even-par 288.

Two weeks later in New York, Sarazen won the U.S. Open and joined Bobby Jones (1926, 1930) as the only two to win both the British Open and U.S. Open in the same year. Subsequent winners of both were Ben Hogan (1953), Lee Trevino (1971), Tom Watson (1982), and Tiger Woods (2000).

This was the only Open Championship held at Prince's, just north of Royal St George's, which has since been the only venue in southeastern England to host.

== Round summaries ==
=== First round ===
Wednesday, 8 June 1932

Place	Player	Score	To par
1	(United States) Gene Sarazen	70	−2
T2	(England) Percy Alliss	71	−1
T2	(England) Bill Davies	71	−1
T2	(United States) Macdonald Smith	71	−1
T2	(England) Charles Whitcombe	71	−1
T6	(England) Cecil Denny	72	E
T6	(England) Arthur Lacey	72	E
T6	(Scotland) Willie McMinn	72	E
T6	(England) Alf Perry	72	E
T6	(England) Fred Taggart	72	E
T6	(England) Charlie Ward	72	E

=== Second round ===
Thursday, 9 June 1932

Place	Player	Score	To par
1	(United States) Gene Sarazen	70-69=139	−5
2	(England) Percy Alliss	71-71=142	−2
T3	(England) Archie Compston	74-70=144	E
T3	(England) Bill Davies	71-73=144	E
T3	(England) Charles Whitcombe	71-73=144	E
T6	(United States) Tommy Armour	75-70=145	+1
T6	(England) Arthur Havers	74-71=145	+1
T6	(England) Fred Robson	74-71=145	+1
T9	(England) Henry Cotton	74-72=146	+2
T9	(England) Arthur Lacey	73-73=146	+2

=== Third round ===
Friday, 10 June 1932 (morning)

Place	Player	Score	To par
1	(United States) Gene Sarazen	70-69-70=209	−7
2	(England) Arthur Havers	74-71-68=213	−3
T3	(England) Arthur Lacey	73-73-71=217	+1
T3	(England) Charles Whitcombe	71-73-73=217	+1
T5	(England) Bill Davies	71-73-74=218	+2
T5	(United States) Macdonald Smith	71-76-71=218	+2
T7	(United States) Tommy Armour	75-70-74=219	+3
T7	(England) Archie Compston	74-70-75=219	+3
9	(England) Syd Easterbrook	74-75-72=221	+5
T10	(England) Henry Cotton	74-72-77=223	+7
T10	(England) Bob Kenyon	74-73-76=223	+7
T10	(England) Abe Mitchell	77-71-75=223	+7
T10	(England) Fred Robson	74-71-78=223	+7

=== Final round ===
Friday, 10 June 1932 (afternoon)

Place	Player	Score	To par	Money (£)
1	(United States) Gene Sarazen	70-69-70-74=283	−5	100
2	(United States) Macdonald Smith	71-76-71-70=288	E	75
3	(England) Arthur Havers	74-71-68-76=289	+1	50
T4	(England) Percy Alliss	71-71-78-72=292	+4	25
T4	(England) Alf Padgham	76-72-74-70=292	+4	25
T4	(England) Charles Whitcombe	71-73-73-75=292	+4	25
T7	(England) Bill Davies	71-73-74-75=293	+5	17; 10s
T7	(England) Arthur Lacey	73-73-71-76=293	+5	17; 10s
9	(England) Fred Robson	74-71-78-71=294	+6	15
T10	(England) Archie Compston	74-70-75-76=295	+7	10
T10	(England) Henry Cotton	74-72-77-72=295	+7	10
T10	(England) Abe Mitchell	77-71-75-72=295	+7	10

Amateurs: Hope (+11), Torrance (+13), Hartley (+14), Munn (+15), Tulloch (+16),
Bentley (+18), Sweeny (+19), McRuvie (+21).
