= Samuel Ryder =

English businessman, entrepreneur, golf enthusiast, and golf promoter

- Born: 24 March 1858; Walton-le-Dale, Lancashire, England
- Died: 2 January 1936 (aged 77); England
- Occupations: Businessman, entrepreneur, golf promoter
- Years active: 1890s–1930s
- Employer(s): Ryder & Son, Heath & Heather
- Known for: Founder of the Ryder Cup, pioneer of selling garden seeds in "penny packets"
- Notable work: Sponsoring professional golf tournaments, including the Ryder Cup
- Spouse: Helen Mary Barnard (m. 1890)
- Children: 1 daughter

Samuel Ryder (24 March 1858 – 2 January 1936) was an English businessman, entrepreneur, golf enthusiast, and golf promoter. He originated the idea of selling garden seeds in "penny packets" and built a very successful business on the concept.

At the age of 50 he became an enthusiastic golfer and then from 1923 to 1925 he, together with his brother James, started sponsoring a number of golf tournaments and matches mostly at his home club of Verulam near St Albans. From late 1925 he started employing Abe Mitchell as his private coach. In early 1926 the idea for a match between British and American professional golfers was proposed. Ryder became involved and sponsored the event. It had been his intention that the match would be the first Ryder Cup but it was later decided that the match would not be an official contest. The first official event, for which Ryder donated a gold trophy, did not take place until 1927.

== Early life ==
Ryder was born at Walton-le-Dale near Preston, Lancashire. He was the fourth of the eight children of Samuel Ryder Sr. (1823/4–1904), a gardener, and Elizabeth (née Martin) (1822/3–1904), a dressmaker. He had three elder and two younger sisters, and two younger brothers. He trained as a teacher at Owens College in Manchester (now the University of Manchester), but did not graduate due to ill health. Ryder first worked at a shipping firm in Manchester, and then for his father, whose business has expanded to include a Nursery, florist, and seed merchant. Friction with his father led Ryder to move south to London to join a rival seed merchant. Ryder married Helen Mary (née Barnard), known as Nellie, on 20 November 1890.

== Business career ==
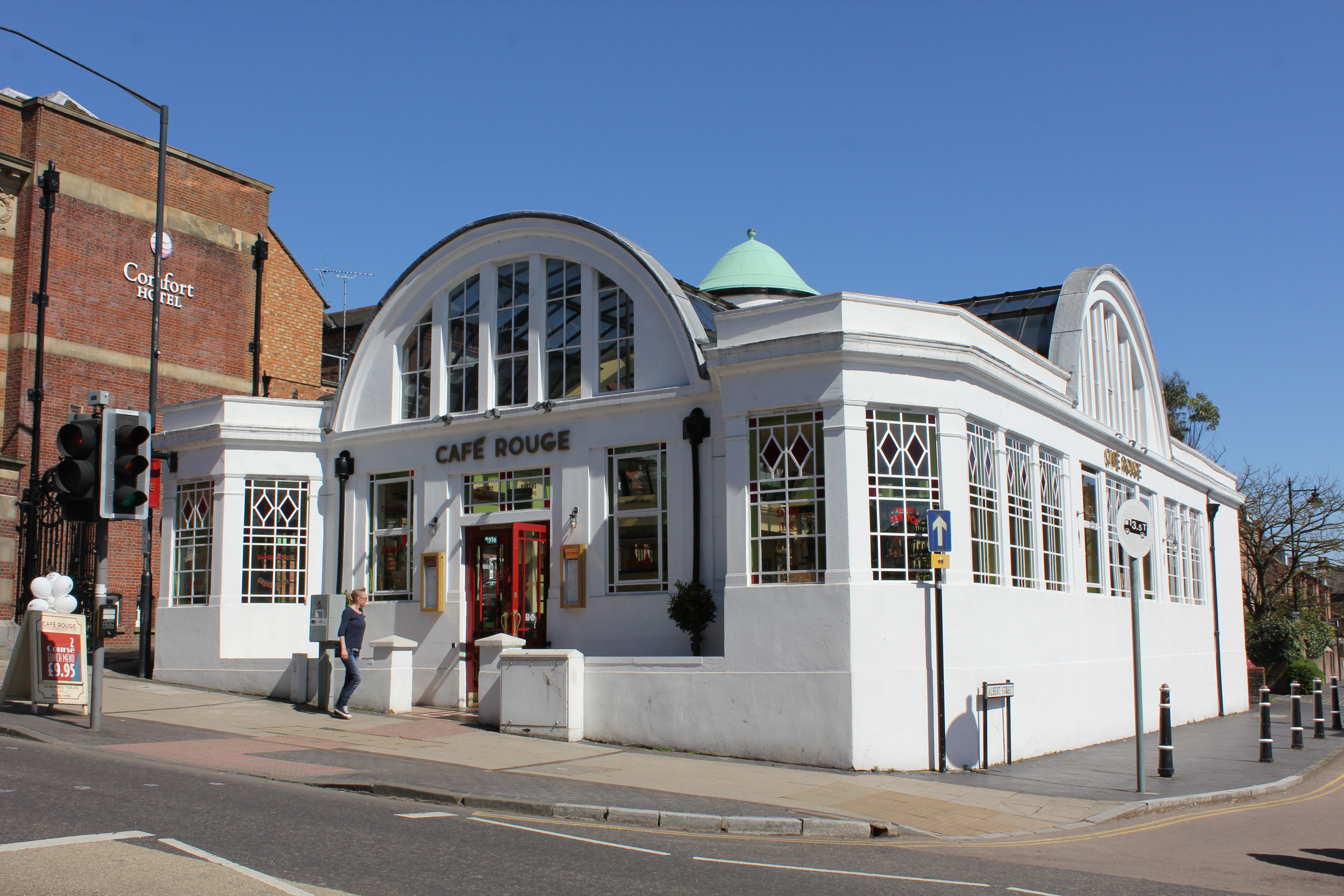
Ryder's shop on Holywell Hill, St Albans

In the 1890s, Samuel Ryder started to sell packets of seeds through the post, priced at one penny each. Other seed merchants also made postal sales, but their packets were much more expensive. He started selling from his home in St Albans, which had good mainline railway connections. He kept his stock in the garden shed of his terraced house on Folly Lane, and was assisted by his wife and daughter. The packets would be posted each Friday so that his customers, working men, would receive them for their time off on Saturday afternoons. The business grew rapidly and Ryder became wealthy. Eventually, the business moved to a large packaging workshop on Holywell Hill, employing around 100 staff. The art deco seed hall is now a Café Rouge restaurant. He established a separate herb business, Heath and Heather, with his brother James in 1922 and in 1924, the company moved to a former hat factory, which had a floor area of some 24,000 square feet (2,200 m^{2}).

== Church involvement ==
Ryder was a committed Christian. He had been a Sunday school teacher in Sale in his youth, and became president of the Mid-Hertfordshire Sunday School Union in 1911. He joined the Independent Chapel in Spicer Street in 1895, the only Congregational Church in St Albans at that time. He assisted the minister, Rev. William Carson, to persuade the church deacons to build a new and larger Congregational church building, Trinity, on the corner of Beaconsfield Road and Victoria Street. When the new church opened on 8 October 1903, there was a civic procession and service at the church. Despite this, there was a significant divide between the Anglicans (Church of England) and the Non-Conformists, which was accentuated in St Albans, such that adherents of each denomination would not trade with the other. Ryder was a Deacon at Trinity Congregational Church (now Trinity United Reformed Church) until he resigned in 1922.

== Political career ==
Ryder was elected to the St Albans town council in 1903, as a Liberal. He was Mayor of St Albans in 1905, and remained a councillor until 1916. When elected mayor in 1905, he surprised his fellow councillors with a tough and uncomplimentary assessment of the council's lack of achievement.

== Golf ==
Ryder enjoyed cricket in his early life, but seems to have played little sport in adult life until he was 50 years old. After he had experienced a period of ill health in 1908, his friend Frank Wheeler, the preacher at Trinity Congregational Church, suggested that he take up golf as a way to get more fresh air. He became an enthusiastic amateur, quickly securing a single-figure handicap and joining Verulam Golf Club, where he served on the greens committee for 20 years. He made large donations to the club, and was appointed captain in 1911, 1926 and 1927. He was also captain of the Stratford-upon-Avon Golf Club in 1929 and 1930.

When Ryder took his family to Dorset for their annual summer holidays, he played golf at Came Down Golf Club. There he met the Whitcombe brothers—Ernest, Charles and Reg—and was impressed by their superb skill. He asked Ernest if they ever played in important tournaments like The Open Championship. Ernest answered "no" as he could not afford it, and went on to say, "The Americans come over here smartly dressed and backed by wealthy supporters; the Britisher has a poor chance compared to that". Ryder considered that something vital was required to rouse clubs to take a real interest and responsibility in encouraging young professionals of talent like the Whitcombe brothers.

=== Heath and Heather ===
From 1920, Samuel Ryder's brother James ran a business in St Albans called "Heath and Heather" for which Samuel had provided some capital. The company sold herbal remedies.

==== Heath and Heather tournament ====
James was, like Samuel, a keen golfer and on 10 July 1923 the brothers sponsored a tournament under the "Heath and Heather" name at their home club of Verulam. The tournament was a 36-hole medal contest with an invited field of 48 professionals. Uniquely, it was the first event in which all the players received prize money to cover expenses. Arthur Havers won the event with a score of 142 which included a course record 67 in the afternoon. James Ockenden took second place, a stroke behind. The total prize money was £500 of which the first prize was £50.

==== Heath and Heather matches ====
The intention was that the Heath and Heather Tournament would become an annual event but in 1924 and 1925 "Heath and Heather" sponsored a series of singles and pairs matches. The following matches were sponsored by "Heath and Heather":

- 2 June 1924 – Challenge match: Abe Mitchell v Charles Whitcombe at Verulam
- 10 and 11 July 1924 – Annual Test: George Duncan and Abe Mitchell v Walter Hagen and Macdonald Smith at St George's Hill and Oxhey
- 4 June 1925 – Challenge match: George Duncan and Abe Mitchell v Ernest and Charles Whitcombe at Verulam
- 11 July 1925 – Annual Test: Abe Mitchell v Jim Barnes at Verulam
- 15 July 1925 – Challenge match: Jim Barnes and Abe Mitchell v Archie Compston and Ted Ray at Verulam

==== Ryle Memorial Medal Match ====
The Ryle Memorial Medal is currently awarded to the Open Champion if he is a member of the PGA but in 1925 it was awarded to the leading member in the Open. In the Open Championship, Archie Compston and Ted Ray had tied for second place behind Jim Barnes. A match was arranged to decide the winner of the medal and "Heath and Heather" agreed to finance the event which took place at Verulam on 24 October. In the morning round Ray took a three-hole lead but Compston won five of the last six holes to be two up at lunch. The afternoon round was evenly matched and Compston eventually won 2&1. At the 11th hole in the afternoon someone accidentally trod on Ray's ball, pressing it into the soft ground. Ray appealed to the referee, Harold Hilton, but before they could do anything Compston had removed the ball and given Ray a good lie. The hole was halved in four.

=== Abe Mitchell ===
After the Compston/Ray match in October 1925, it was announced that "Heath and Heather" would no longer sponsor golf events. However, it was immediately announced that Abe Mitchell would, from Christmas 1925, be taking up a "private appointment" with Samuel Ryder with a salary of £500 and £250 for expenses. Although it was formally announced that Mitchell would be Ryder's private coach, a major purpose of the appointment was to enable Mitchell to play in all important tournaments and to practise as much as he wished. Ryder saw Mitchell as the man who could beat the Americans in the Open Championship. The appointment was initially for three years.

=== Ryder Cup ===
An informal 1926 match held at Wentworth Club between teams of professionals from Great Britain and the USA served as the impetus for the first official match for the Ryder Cup, staged at Worcester Country Club in Massachusetts, USA during June 1927. The format, which is still used today, consists of a competition staged in alternate years, with the two sides taking turns as hosts. Ryder attended the first two home matches played at Moortown and Southport in 1929 and 1933 respectively, being especially pleased to present the cup to Britain's successful captain George Duncan in 1929. The trophy was manufactured by Mappin & Webb and cost nearly £300.

=== Later sponsorship ===
Even though Ryder had started his support of Abe Mitchell in late 1925 and was also financially supporting the Ryder Cup, he continued to sponsor other professional events, although on a personal basis and not under the Heath and Heather name. The most important were:

- 28 September 1927 – Young Professionals' Tournament at Verulam. Invitation tournament for 12 young British professionals with prize money of £100.
- 4 April 1928 – Seniors v Juniors match at Verulam. 10 players-a-side 36-hole matchplay with £250 for expenses and prize money.
- 11 and 12 July 1928 – Ryder Tournament at Verulam. The tournament was restricted to the leading British professionals in the 1928 Open Championship. The players had to be resident in Britain. The Times noted that it was "in the nature of a British Close Championship". Prize money was £500.

== Later life ==
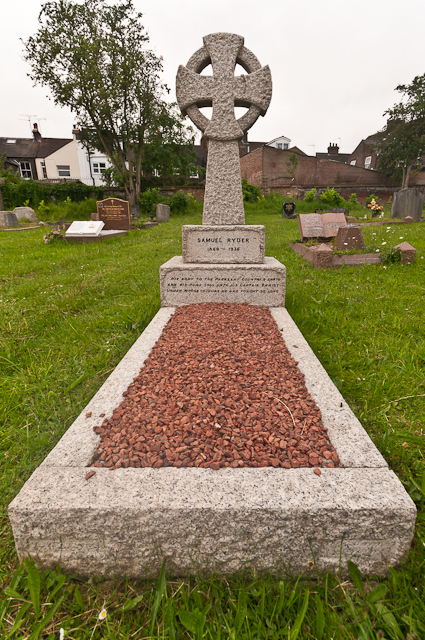
Samuel Ryder's grave

Ryder suffered from poor health in later life, and spent some time in South Africa and with his elder daughter Marjorie in Rhodesia, where she had emigrated. He died on 2 January 1936 at the Langham Hotel in Portland Place, London, the family's traditional Christmas holiday residence. After a funeral at Trinity Congregational Church in St Albans, he was buried in Hatfield Road Cemetery. His youngest daughter, Joan, took over the management of his companies after his death.

== Family ==
Ryder's widow, Helen, died in 1955 at the age of 91. They had three daughters.

== Sources ==
- Fry, Peter (July 2000). Samuel Ryder - The Man Behind the Ryder Cup. Wright Press. ISBN 978-0-9539087-0-7.
