= Dick Burton (golfer) =

English professional golfer (1907–1974)

Personal information
- Full name: Richard Burton
- Nationality: England
- Born: 11 October 1907 Darwen, Lancashire, England
- Died: 30 January 1974 (aged 66) Kingston upon Thames, England

Career
- Sport: Golf
- Turned professional: 1929
- Professional wins: 14

Best results in major championships (wins: 1)
- Masters Tournament: DNP
- PGA Championship: DNP
- U.S. Open: CUT: 1946
- The Open Championship: Won: 1939

Richard Burton (11 October 1907 – 30 January 1974) was an English professional golfer.

Burton, a former four-loom weaver at Cobden Mill, is mainly remembered for winning The Open Championship (British Open) in 1939, when it was played on the Old Course at St Andrews in Scotland and holding the Open title for the longest time – from 1939 till after World War II. He played for Great Britain in the Ryder Cup in 1935, 1937, and 1949, and won two of his five matches.

== Early life ==
Burton was born on a farm at Winter Hill in Darwen, Lancashire. The Burton family lived next to the Darwen Golf Club before moving to Lynwood Avenue. Richard was the youngest, but tallest, of three boys and with his brothers, Tom and John, used to watch members playing past their farm which was just above the clubhouse. As they had no golf equipment themselves, they had to make do with hitting bobbins from their mother's workbasket around the farm with an old walking stick. Eventually the brothers were given a few old hickory shafted clubs. Burton had started out as a caddie at Darwen Golf Club before applying for the position of greensman. After a number of years, in 1929, he then replaced his brother John as the club professional when John moved to the Hillside Club in Southport. Three years later, in 1932, Burton was appointed the professional at Hooton Golf Club, which is now known as Ellesmere Port Golf Club, which gave him more opportunity to play competitive golf. Also around this time Burton's remaining brother, Tom, was appointed the club professional at Darwen to complete a unique trio for the Burton family.

== Professional career ==
In 1934, Burton won the Northern Professional Championship, the first of many titles, the following year he collected the Dunlop-Northern Tournament and made his first appearance in the Ryder Cup for Great Britain. He was also runner-up in the Dunlop-Southport Tournament, semi-finalist in the News of the World Match Play and third in the Scottish Penfold Tournament. In 1936, Burton added the Yorkshire Evening News Tournament at Leeds Golf Club to his list of titles and he was runner-up in the Dunlop-Southport Tournament again but made the England team to play the annual match against Scotland, the first of three consecutive appearances. 1937 saw Burton win the Dunlop-Southport Tournament and he also appeared in the Coronation Match for King George VI. He appeared in the Ryder Cup again and was appointed the professional at Sale Golf Club on the Manchester Cheshire border and was the club professional until 1946. The following years brought more success, winning Manchester and District Professional Championship, being selected for the England team to play Ireland & Wales and finishing joint 4th in the 1938 Open Championship, held at Royal St George's in Kent, eight shots behind Reg Whitcombe.

At the 1939 Open Championship at the Old Course at St Andrews, his first three rounds of 70, 72 and 77 put in him contention. Burton started his fourth round already knowing that he needed to score 72 or better to win the title as his rivals had completed their rounds. He did not start well as he 3-putted at the first hole but he recovered and carded two birdies in the last three holes on the front nine to go out in 35 and leave him in a great position. On the second part of the course, Burton played cautiously at the treacherous 14th for a five and avoided the sandtraps on the 17th. He came to the last needing a four to win and hit a huge drive, then pitched to 15 feet. His putt looked like it might race past the hole but as Burton walked after it, it dropped in the hole for a closing birdie. A 71 left him on 290 to win by two shots from Johnny Bulla. Burton was the sixth British winner in a row since Denny Shute had won the last Open at St Andrews in 1933.

In 1939, apart from his Open triumph, Burton also won the True Temper Foursomes Tournament, partnering Fred Robson and lost in a playoff to Alf Padgham for the Silver King Tournament.

He won the News Chronicle Tournament, at Hollingbury Park Golf Club, in 1949 with a record aggregate for 72 holes, at the time, with 266 strokes.

== Personal life ==
Burton's only book, named Length with Discretion, was published in 1939, shortly after his Open triumph, through Hutchinson & Co Publishers. It was a golf instruction in 13 chapters with illustrations. However, a few weeks after his Open triumph, Burton was serving in the RAF and never really had the opportunity to capitalise on his success. The fairways at the Old Course at St Andrews ended up being used by the RAF as runways. When asked, later in life, if he regretted not being able to capitalise on the Open Championship win he replied "I was lucky enough…a lot of those who watched me at St Andrews also went off to war and they never came back. Some of my friends didn’t make it either, I did." Burton also helped the war effort by raising money for the Red Cross by playing charity matches with Henry Cotton, who was also serving in the RAF.

In the spring of 1946, he wrote to the Royal and Ancient, "Dear Sirs, Please find enclosed my fee of five guineas for this year's Open. I will bring the trophy back when I come."

Burton is still celebrated at Sale Golf Club. Every year the club holds the Richard Burton Trophy on the weekend of the Open Championship, and have a display including the putter he used to win the Open. In later life, he was the club professional at Coombe Hill Golf Club in Kingston, Surrey. His assistant there was Neil Coles. Burton once bet a rival that he could beat him using only a putter. He lost his bet, but only on the 18th hole.

When Burton played fourball with other members, rather than pair up with a member, he would play against all three, and give full handicaps. He still won more often than not.

Also, Burton reputedly hit the 120-yard 17th hole with every club in his bag, including the putter.

Burton died in hospital on 30 January 1974 after a long illness.

== Tournament wins (14) ==
- 1934 Northern Professional Championship
- 1935 Dunlop-Northern Tournament
- 1936 Yorkshire Evening News Tournament
- 1937 Dunlop-Southport Tournament
- 1938 Manchester and District Professional Championship
- 1939 Open Championship, True Temper Foursomes Tournament (with Fred Robson), Manchester and District Professional Championship
- 1940 Daily Mail Tournament, Manchester and District Professional Championship
- 1946 Surrey Open Championship
- 1949 Silver King Tournament, News Chronicle Tournament
- 1953 Surrey Open Championship

== Major championships ==
=== Wins (1) ===
Year	Championship	54 holes	Winning score	Margin	Runner-up
1939	The Open Championship	4 shot deficit	70-72-77-71=290	2 strokes	(United States) Johnny Bulla

=== Results timeline ===
Tournament	1932	1933	1934	1935	1936	1937	1938	1939
U.S. Open								
The Open Championship	T48	CUT	T39	CUT	T12	CUT	T4	1

Tournament	1940	1941	1942	1943	1944	1945	1946	1947	1948	1949
U.S. Open			NT	NT	NT	NT	CUT			
The Open Championship	NT	NT	NT	NT	NT	NT	12	5	T18	T14

Tournament	1950	1951	1952	1953	1954	1955	1956	1957	1958	1959
U.S. Open										
The Open Championship	CUT	T12		T47			CUT	CUT		CUT

Tournament	1960	1961	1962	1963	1964	1965	1966	1967	1968
U.S. Open									
The Open Championship		CUT		CUT					CUT

Note: Burton never played in the Masters Tournament or the PGA Championship.

Win
Top 10
Did not play

NT = no tournament
CUT = missed the half-way cut
"T" indicates a tie for a place

== Team appearances ==
- Ryder Cup (representing Great Britain): 1935, 1937, 1949
- England–Scotland Professional Match (representing England): 1935 (winners), 1936 (winners), 1937 (winners), 1938 (winners)
- Coronation Match (representing the Ladies and Professionals): 1937
- Llandudno International Golf Trophy (representing England): 1938 (winners)
