= Dunlop-Metropolitan Tournament =

Dunlop-Metropolitan
Tournament information
- Location: South East England
- Established: 1934
- Month played: September/October
- Final year: 1938

Final champion
- Alf Perry

The Dunlop-Metropolitan Tournament was an invitation professional golf tournament played in South East England. It was founded in 1934. The tournament was played towards the end of the season and was played over 72 holes of stroke play. The event had a small field; entry being mostly based on high finishes in important British and Continental events earlier in the year. Past Open Champions were also invited. The tournament was informally called "The Championship of Champions" and was "equivalent almost to the Masters' tournament of America" which was also founded in 1934.

After World War II the event was continued as the Dunlop Masters which started in 1946 and was a similar 72-hole end-of-season event with a restricted field.

== History ==
The first tournament was played on 11 and 12 October 1934 on the New Course at Walton Heath Golf Club, contested by a field of 53. Ernest Whitcombe led after the first day, with two rounds of 69. After a 68 on the second morning his lead increased to eight and despite a final round of 77 he won by four strokes. There was no cut. Prize money amounted to £500.

It was planned to play the event again on 24 and 25 September 1935. With the Ryder Cup team leaving for America on 14 September and an earlier date not being possible, the tournament was cancelled.

The second tournament was played from 22 to 24 September 1936 on the West Course at Wentworth with a field of 62. Arthur Lacey led on the first day with a 70, a new record for the altered course. Henry Cotton broke this with a 68 on the second day and was tied with Lacey for the lead on 140. 33 players scoring 155 or better played 36 holes on the final day. Cotton scored 70, Lacey 75 and Reg Whitcombe, playing with Cotton, scored 68 to take second place, four behind Cotton. Jimmy Adams set a new record with a 67. In the final round Cotton's 71 gave him a three shot win over Whitcombe (70) and Lacey (69). Charles Whitcombe finished fourth, a distant nine shots behind Cotton.

The third tournament was played on 21 and 22 September 1937, again on the West Course at Wentworth. The field consisted of the winners, runners-up, other players who had finished in "prominent positions" in the important 1937 events, together with a number of Open Championship winners, 36 players in all. The field included 69-year-old Sandy Herd, the 1904 Open champion. On the first day Reg Whitcombe led on 138, having set a new course record of 66 in the morning round. Whitcombe scored 72 on the second morning and was level on 210 with Arthur Lacey with Henry Cotton and Paddy Mahon on 213. Whitcombe struggled with a final round 76 and Lacey's 67 gave him a 5 stroke victory. Bill Laidlaw equalled the course record with a final round 66.

The fourth tournament was played on 20 and 21 September 1938 on the West Course at Wentworth. 29 players qualified. Prize money was increased from £500 to £750. In wet conditions Alf Perry led after the first day on 137 (69-68), six ahead of second place Jimmy Adams. Perry had rounds of 67 and 69 on the second day to win comfortably. Henry Cotton was his only challenger after a course record 64 in the third round.

The 1939 tournament was planned to be played at Wentworth on 19 and 20 September 1939 but was cancelled because of the start of World War II.

== Winners ==
Year	Winner	Venue	Score	Margin of victory	Runner(s)-up	Winner's share (£)	Ref
1934	(England) Ernest Whitcombe	Walton Heath Golf Club	283	4 strokes	(England) Jack Busson	150	
1935: No tournament because of the Ryder Cup
1936	(England) Henry Cotton	Wentworth Club	281	3 strokes	(England) Arthur Lacey (England) Reg Whitcombe	150	
1937	(England) Arthur Lacey	Wentworth Club	277	5 strokes	(Republic of Ireland) Paddy Mahon	150	
1938	(England) Alf Perry	Wentworth Club	273	6 strokes	(England) Henry Cotton	200	
1939: Cancelled due to the outbreak of World War II

Between 1933 and 1937 Dunlop also sponsored a number of sectional tournaments. The format varied but was often a 36-hole or match-play event. The events were sometimes qualifying events for the Dunlop-Metropolitan Tournament.

=== Dunlop-Scottish Tournament ===
Winners: 1933: (Scotland) Jimmy McDowall 1934: (England) Mark Seymour 1935: (England) Mark Seymour 1936: (Scotland) George Knight 1937: (Scotland) Laurie Ayton, Snr

=== Dunlop-Irish Tournament ===
Winners: 1933: (Republic of Ireland) Willie Nolan and (Republic of Ireland) Pat O'Connor (tied) 1934: (Republic of Ireland) Willie Nolan 1935: (Republic of Ireland) Pat O'Connor 1936: (Republic of Ireland) Paddy Mahon 1937: (Republic of Ireland) John McKenna

=== Dunlop-Welsh Tournament ===
Winners: 1934: (Wales) Frank Hill 1935: (Wales) Frank Hill and (England) Edward Musty (tied) 1936: (Wales) Frank Hill 1937: (Wales) Fred Healing and (Wales) Ken Williams (tied)

=== Dunlop-Eastern Tournament ===
Winners: 1934: (England) Ernest Riseborough 1935: (England) James Sherlock 1936: (England) James Sherlock 1937: DR Harper

=== Dunlop-Midland Professional Championship ===
Winners: 1934: (England) Charlie Ward 1935: (England) Bill Firkins 1936: (England) Bill Branch 1937: (England) Freddie Beck

In these years Dunlop sponsored the Midland Professional Championship which has been contested since 1898.

=== Dunlop-Northern Tournament ===
Winners: 1934: (Wales) D. C. Jones and Jack Moffat (tied) 1935: (England) Dick Burton 1936: (England) Albert Chevalier and (England) Ernest Smith (tied) 1937: (England) Bert Gadd

=== Dunlop-Southern Tournament ===
Winners: 1934: (England) Abe Mitchell 1935: (Scotland) Allan Dailey 1936: (England) Sam King 1937: (England) Sam King

=== Dunlop-West of England Tournament ===
Winners: 1934: (England) Syd Easterbrook 1935: (England) Fred Jewell 1936: (England) Reg Whitcombe 1937: (England) Reg Whitcombe
