= Dunlop-Southport Tournament =

Southport Tournament
Tournament information
- Location: Southport, England
- Established: 1930
- Month played: May
- Final year: 1948

Final champion
- Fred Daly

The Southport Tournament was a professional golf tournament played in the Southport area in North West England. It was founded in 1930 when it was sponsored by a Manchester newspaper, the Daily Dispatch. From 1931 it was sponsored by Dunlop, with joint funding by Southport Corporation, and was known as the Dunlop-Southport Tournament. The last event was played in 1948 when Southport Corporation withdrew their funding. It was replaced by the "Dunlop Tournament", played at various locations in the United Kingdom. The tournament was played in May over 72 holes of stroke play. Qualifying, over 36 holes, took place at local courses immediately before the tournament.

Henry Cotton dominated the first six events, winning twice and being runner-up in the other four.

The 1939 event was cancelled because of difficulties finding suitable courses for qualifying and for the event itself.

== Winners ==
Year	Winner	Venue	Score	Margin of victory	Runner(s)-up	Winner's share (£)	Ref
Daily Dispatch Southport Tournament
1930	(England) Archie Compston	Royal Birkdale	285	4 strokes	(England) Henry Cotton (United States) Horton Smith	200	
Dunlop-Southport Tournament
1931	(England) Henry Cotton	Southport and Ainsdale Golf Club	287	2 strokes	(England) Archie Compston	360	
1932	(England) Henry Cotton	Hesketh Golf Club	281	Playoff (36 holes)	(England) Bill Twine	360	
1933	(England) Bill Davies	Southport and Ainsdale Golf Club	293	1 stroke	(England) Henry Cotton (Republic of Ireland) Willie Nolan (England) Ernest Whitcombe		
1934	(England) Alf Padgham	Southport and Ainsdale Golf Club	279	2 strokes	(England) Henry Cotton	300	
1935	(England) Charles Whitcombe	Royal Birkdale	295	1 stroke	(England) Dick Burton (England) Henry Cotton	315	
1936	(England) Alf Padgham	Southport and Ainsdale Golf Club	282	2 strokes	(England) Dick Burton	315	
1937	(England) Dick Burton	Hesketh Golf Club	280	3 strokes	(England) Charles Whitcombe		
1938	(England) Don Curtis	Southport and Ainsdale Golf Club	287	2 strokes	(England) Arthur Lees	315	
1939: No tournament
1940–45: No tournament due to World War II
1946	(England) Max Faulkner	Southport and Ainsdale Golf Club	296	1 stroke	(Australia) Norman Von Nida	350	
1947	(Australia) Norman Von Nida	Hesketh Golf Club	285	5 strokes	(England) Charlie Ward	350	
1948	(Northern Ireland) Fred Daly	Southport and Ainsdale Golf Club	290	Playoff (36 holes)	(Northern Ireland) Ted McNeill	350	
