= Willie Nolan =

Irish professional golfer (1896–1939)

Personal information
- Full name: William Nolan
- Nationality: Ireland
- Born: 25 March 1896 Bray, County Wicklow, Ireland
- Died: 4 March 1939 (aged 42) Dublin, Ireland

Career
- Sport: Golf
- Status: Professional
- Professional wins: 3

Best results in major championships
- Masters Tournament: DNP
- PGA Championship: DNP
- U.S. Open: DNP
- The Open Championship: T21: 1934

William Nolan (25 March 1896 – 4 March 1939) was an Irish professional golfer. He was one of the leading Irish professionals of the inter-war period. In 1933 he was a runner-up in the Dunlop-Southport Tournament and led qualifying in the Open Championship. He won the Irish Professional Championship in 1934. He died in 1939 aged 42.

== Golf career ==
The first Irish Open was played at Portmarnock Golf Club in August 1927. Nolan had been the professional at Portmarnock since 1925 and led the tournament after the first round with a 72, a new course record. Erratic driving led to a second round 83 and 12th place but two useful rounds in difficult conditions on the final day left him in fifth place, earning £40.

Nolan came to wider prominence when he was a runner-up in the 1933 Dunlop-Southport Tournament at Southport and Ainsdale Golf Club. The tournament was won by Bill Davies with Nolan, Henry Cotton and Ernest Whitcombe a stroke behind. Cotton had won the event in 1931 and 1932.

At the 1933 Open Championship Nolan set a new course record for the Old Course at St Andrews during the qualification. On the first day of qualifying he had scored 71 on the New course and then had a 67 on the Old Course the following day, to beat the record of 68 held by Bobby Jones set during the 1927 Open Championship. Nolan led the qualifiers on 138, four ahead of Horton Smith and eight ahead of the rest. In the event itself, Nolan started with 71 and 75 but had rounds of 79 and 80 on the final day to drop into a tie for 31st place.

In the 1934 Open Championship at Royal St George's Golf Club Nolan again started well and was tied for 8th after three rounds. A final round 83 dropped him well down the leaderboard. Nolan won his only Irish Professional Championship at Dún Laoghaire in July 1934. His score of 282 was a record low for the championship and gave him a one stroke win over AJ Ward. He was runner-up in the championship in 1925, 1928 and 1938. Nolan had tied the 1933 Dunlop-Irish Tournament with Pat O'Connor, but in August 1934 he won it outright when it was played at Knock Golf Club, Belfast.

Nolan was a regular competitor in the Open Championship, playing 11 times between 1926 and 1938. His best finish was to be tied for 21st place in 1934. He was also a regular in the Irish team from when the professional international matches were restarted in 1932.

Nolan was professional at Sutton, Tullamore (1922), County Sligo (1921), Galway (1921), Howth (1924) and then Portmarnock from 1925 until his death.

== Death ==
Nolan died in a Dublin hospital on 4 March 1939, at age 42. Willie Nolan Road in Baldoyle, the only road in Ireland named after a golfer, takes his name.

== Professional wins (3) ==
- 1933 Dunlop-Irish Tournament (tie with Pat O'Connor)
- 1934 Irish Professional Championship, Dunlop-Irish Tournament

== Results in major championships ==
Tournament	1926	1927	1928	1929	1930	1931	1932	1933	1934	1935	1936	1937	1938
The Open Championship	CUT	CUT	CUT	T23	T36	CUT		T31	T21	CUT		T37	CUT

Note: Nolan only played in The Open Championship.

Did not play

CUT = missed the half-way cut
"T" indicates a tie for a place

== Team appearances ==
- England-Ireland Professional Match (representing Ireland): 1932, 1933
- Ireland–Scotland Professional Match (representing Ireland): 1932 (tie), 1933 (winners), 1934 (winners), 1935 (winners), 1936 (winners)
- Triangular Professional Tournament (representing Ireland): 1937
- Llandudno International Golf Trophy (representing Ireland): 1938
