= Daily Mail Tournament =

Tournament information
- Location: United Kingdom
- Established: 1919
- Final year: 1950

Final champion
- Charlie Ward

The Daily Mail Tournament was a professional golf tournament played in the United Kingdom. The Daily Mail sponsored the St Andrews Tournament in 1919 and in 1920 continued their sponsorship with the start of the Daily Mail Tournament. The event was dropped after the 1927 tournament and not reinstated until 1936. The event was unusual in that it took place in 1940, after the start of World War II. The prize money for the 1940 event was just £500, money being raised for the Red Cross A tournament was also played in September 1945, soon after the end of the war, and was informally referred to as the "Victory" tournament. The last event was played in 1950.

== 1919 ==
The Daily Mail started their sponsorship by providing £500 for prizes for the St Andrews Tournament played over the Old Course on 25 and 26 June 1919. The event was organised by the PGA. Since there was not enough time to organise qualifying contests the entry was restricted to the 60 leading PGA members in the 1914 Open Championship. The PGA later invited locals Laurie Ayton, Snr and Andrew Kirkaldy who would not otherwise have qualified. The Open Championship was not played in 1919 and the tournament was regarded as the most important of the year. This tournament sometimes called the "Victory Open" even though it was restricted to professionals.

Ted Ray led after the first day on 150 with two rounds of 75. Abe Mitchell was second on 151 with Fred Leach, Arnaud Massy and Willie Ritchie on 153 and James Batley on 154. The over-night leaders struggled on the second day. Ray took 80 and 85 and finished fourth while Mitchell's 80 and 81 put him on 312. Harry Vardon and Sandy Herd had the best scores on the second day. Vardon had rounds of 76 and 77 and a total of 313, good enough for third place, while Herd scored 75 and 78 and a total of 316 gave him a tie for fifth place with Batley. George Duncan scored 78 and 76 and finished on 312 to tie Mitchell. There was no play-off and so Duncan and Mitchell shared the prize money, taking £87 10s each. Vardon took £50 and a bronze medal, Ray £30 and there were prizes down to £5 for 20th place. Since a stroke-play competition had been arranged for the following morning on the Eden Course, and with the field including both Duncan and Mitchell, it was decided that the round would decide the possession of the gold and silver medals.

The Daily Mail also provided £125 in prize money for a tournament played the following day, 27 June, on the Eden Course. 8 players were invited: 4 from England and 4 from Scotland. England were represented by Harry Vardon, J.H. Taylor, Ted Ray and Abe Mitchell while Scotland had James Braid, George Duncan, Sandy Herd and Laurie Ayton, Snr. A medal round was played in the morning with each group being an England/Scotland pairing. Ray had an excellent round of 71 and won by 5 shots, taking the £20 first prize. Taylor had a 76 and took the £15 second prize while Herd and Mitchell scored 77 and shared third place. Mitchell's 77 bettered the Duncan's 79 and he took the gold medal from the St Andrews tournament. Two Scotland against England foursomes were played in the afternoon. Ray and Taylor won their match while Duncan and Braid won the other. The winning players won £7 10s each, the losers £2 10s.

== Winners ==
Year	Winner	Country	Venue	Score	Margin of victory	Runner(s)-up	Winner's share (£)	Ref
St Andrews Tournament
1919	George Duncan	Scotland	Old Course at St Andrews	312	Tie		Shared 100 and 75	
1919	Abe Mitchell	England	Old Course at St Andrews	312	Tie		Shared 100 and 75	
Daily Mail Tournament
1920	George Duncan	Scotland	Royal North Devon Golf Club	291	7 strokes	(England) Abe Mitchell	100	
1921	Albert Hallam	England	Formby Golf Club	295	1 stroke	(England) Arthur Havers	300	
1922	George Duncan	Scotland	Old Course at St Andrews	300	4 strokes	(Jersey) Ted Ray	300	
1923	Ted Ray	Jersey	Lytham & St Annes Golf Club	288	1 stroke	(England) Len Holland (England) Abe Mitchell	300	
1924	Charles Whitcombe	England	Royal Cinque Ports Golf Club	289	9 strokes	(England) Len Holland	300	
1925	Charles Johns	England	Notts Golf Club	293	1 stroke	(England) James Adwick (England) George Buckle (England) Tom Williamson	300	
1926	Aubrey Boomer	Jersey	Old Course at St Andrews	297	3 strokes	(Scotland) George Duncan (England) Abe Mitchell	300	
1927	Abe Mitchell	England	Wentworth Golf Club	294	3 strokes	(England) Fred Robson	300	
1928–35: No tournament
1936	Alf Padgham	England	Bramshot Golf Club	284	3 strokes	(England) Sam King	500	
1937	Sam King	England	Little Aston Golf Club	283	4 strokes	(England) Henry Cotton	500	
1938	Alf Perry	England	Gosforth Golf Club	284	4 strokes	(Wales) Dai Rees	500	
1939	Henry Cotton	England	Queens Park Golf Club	292	Playoff (36 holes)	(England) Archie Compston	500	
1940	Dick Burton	England	Sundridge Park Golf Club	280	1 stroke	(England) Henry Cotton	100	
1941–44: No tournament due to World War II
1945	Charlie Ward	England	Old Course at St Andrews	298	1 stroke	(England) Max Faulkner	200	
1946	Alf Padgham	England	Royal Lytham & St Annes Golf Club	301	3 strokes	(England) Charlie Ward	525	
1947	Dai Rees	Wales	Kilmarnock (Barassie) Golf Club	279	2 strokes	(Australia) Norman Von Nida	525	
1948	Norman Von Nida	Australia	Sunningdale Golf Club	270	5 strokes	(England) Reg Whitcombe	525	
1949	Tom Haliburton	Scotland	Glasgow Golf Club	271	1 stroke	(Scotland) Laurie Ayton, Jnr	525	
1950	Charlie Ward	England	Walton Heath Golf Club	290	Playoff (36 holes)	(South Africa) Bobby Locke (Australia) Ossie Pickworth	525	
