= Daily Sketch Fourball Tournament =

Tournament information
- Location: Fulwell, London, England
- Established: 1945
- Course(s): Fulwell Golf Club
- Final year: 1945

Final champion
- William Anderson and Reg Whitcombe

The Daily Sketch Fourball Tournament was a professional fourball golf tournament played at Fulwell Golf Club, England in September 1945 and sponsored by the Daily Sketch newspaper. The event was held just once, with total prize money was £1,000. Pairings were decided by a draw. After two rounds, a maximum of 12 pairs qualified for the final 36 holes on the third day. With 5 pairs tied on 139, just the 10 pairs scoring 138 or better qualified.

The tournament was won by Reg Whitcombe and Scottish international and Murcar professional William Anderson after a last round 65. They finished two ahead of Henry Cotton and Worthing assistant Joe Baker.

== Winners ==
Year	Winners	Country	Venue	Score	Margin of victory	Runners-up	Winner's share (£)	Ref
1945	William Anderson; Reg Whitcombe	Scotland; England	Fulwell Golf Club	270	2 strokes	(England) Joe Baker (England) Henry Cotton		
