= Ed Dudley =

American professional golfer (1901–1963)

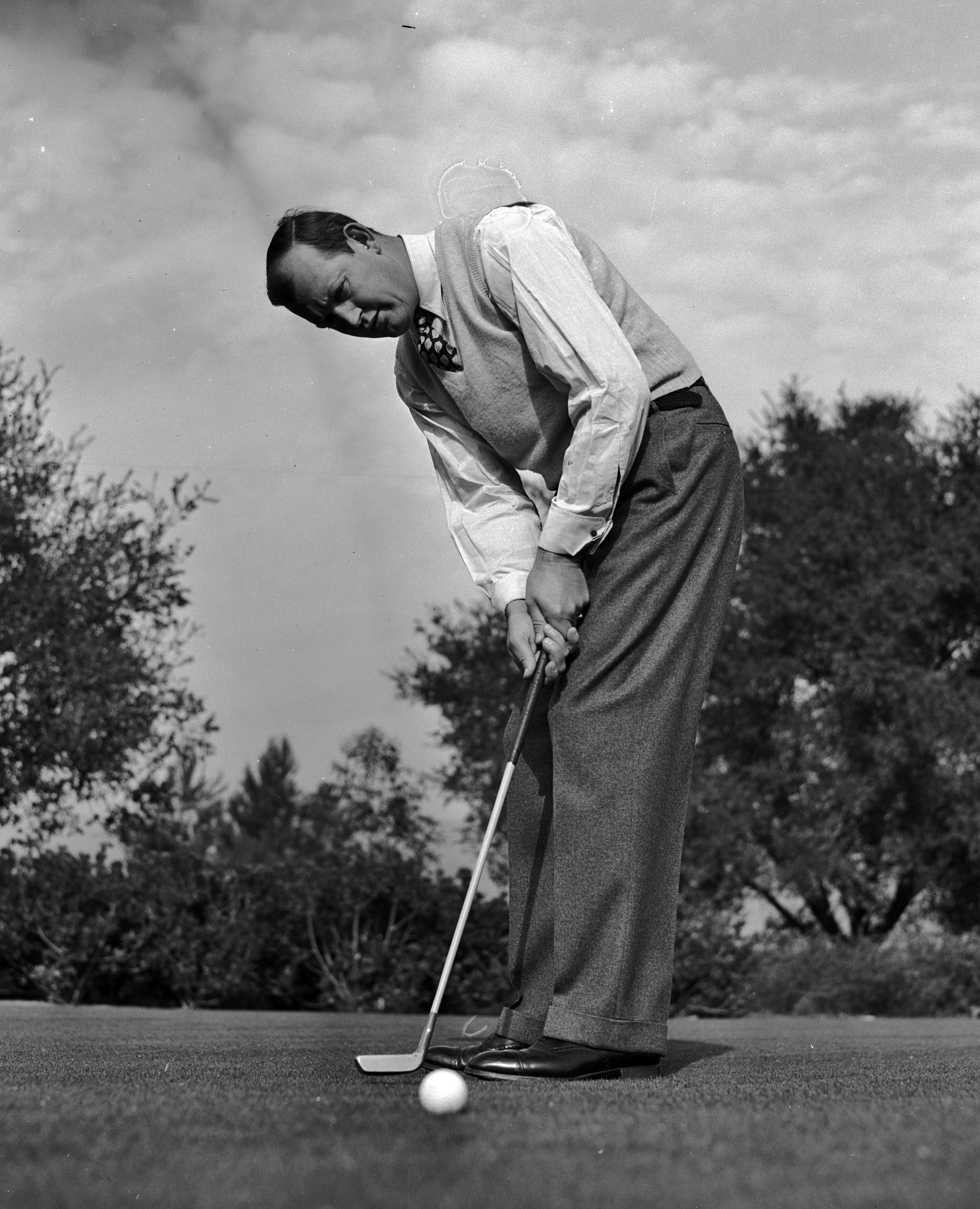
- Dudley in 1939

Personal information
- Full name: Edward Bishop Dudley
- Nickname: Big Ed
- Nationality: United States
- Born: February 19, 1901 Brunswick, Georgia, U.S.
- Died: October 25, 1963 (aged 62) Colorado Springs, Colorado, U.S.
- Height: 6 ft 4 in (193 cm)
- Weight: 200 lb (91 kg; 14 st)

Career
- Sport: Golf
- Status: Professional
- Former tour: PGA Tour
- Professional wins: 19

Number of wins by tour
- PGA Tour: 15
- Other: 4

Best results in major championships
- Masters Tournament: 3rd: 1937
- PGA Championship: T3: 1932
- U.S. Open: 5th: 1937
- The Open Championship: 6th: 1937

Edward Bishop Dudley (February 19, 1901 – October 25, 1963) was an American professional golfer active in the late 1920s and 1930s. He was given the nickname of "Big Ed" in acknowledgment of his 6 ft 4 in (1.93 m) frame.

== Biography ==
Born in Brunswick, Georgia, Dudley was a 15-time winner on the PGA Tour. His achievements were mainly recognized retrospectively, since the PGA Tour of today did not formally exist as such; this situation was the same for all of his cohorts as well. The tour as it was begun and evolved in the early 1920s, making Dudley one of its early pioneers. His first noteworthy professional results were made in the 1925 season, when he won the Oklahoma Open among other strong showings.

After winning both the Los Angeles and Western Opens in 1931, Dudley had his best year in 1933, when he was a quarter-finalist in the PGA Championship and won selection to the Ryder Cup team (having also played on the 1929 team). He won two key matches in the 1937 Ryder Cup, to help the United States win for the first time in Great Britain. In a total of four Ryder Cup matches played, Dudley compiled a record of three wins and one loss, across three Cup series. All Ryder Cup matches were played at 36 holes in that era. All three U.S. teams he played for (1929: Moor Park Golf Club, 1933: Southport and Ainsdale Golf Club, and 1937: again, Southport and Ainsdale) had to travel to Great Britain. Dudley also served as Ryder Cup honorary team captain in 1949, when the matches were played at the Ganton Golf Club in England; the USA also won that match.

Dudley finished 24 times in the top-10 at major championships, and this is a record among players who did not win at least one major. His high finishes in majors include third place at the PGA Championship in 1932, and at the Masters Tournament in 1937. In 1937, he became the first player to finish in the top-10 in all four majors in one year, a feat not repeated until Arnold Palmer in 1960.

Dudley served as the first head golf professional at the newly established Augusta National Golf Club, from 1932 to 1957. He served as president of the PGA of America from 1942 to 1948. He is a member of the PGA Hall of Fame. He was posthumously inducted into the Georgia Golf Hall of Fame in 1990. He was also the club professional at the Broadmoor Golf Club in Colorado Springs, Colorado for over two decades; this shared arrangement with Augusta National was possible because of the mainly mid-autumn through early spring season at Augusta National.

Among Dudley's most famous students were President Dwight Eisenhower, singer Bing Crosby, and comedian Bob Hope. Dudley died of a heart attack in Colorado Springs, one week after undergoing surgery to remove blood clots from his leg.

== Awards and honors ==
- Over the course of his career, he was inducted into the PGA Hall of Fame
- In 1990, he was inducted into the Georgia Golf Hall of Fame

== Professional wins (19) ==
=== PGA Tour wins (13) ===
- 1929 (2) Pennsylvania Open Championship, Philadelphia Open Championship
- 1930 (2) Shawnee Open, Pennsylvania Open Championship
- 1931 (2) Los Angeles Open, Western Open
- 1932 (1) Miami International Four-Ball (with Tommy Armour)
- 1933 (2) Philadelphia Open Championship, Hershey Open
- 1935 (1) True Temper Open Championship
- 1936 (2) Shawnee Open, Philadelphia Open Championship
- 1937 (1) Sacramento Open

=== Other wins (6) ===
- 1925 Oklahoma Open
- 1926 Oklahoma Open
- 1928 Southern California Pro
- 1939 Walter Hagen 25th Anniversary (with Billy Burke)
- 1940 Philadelphia Open Championship
- 1942 Utah Open

== Results in major championships ==
Tournament	1925	1926	1927	1928	1929
U.S. Open			WD	T6	CUT
The Open Championship					T18
PGA Championship	R16		R16	QF	

Tournament	1930	1931	1932	1933	1934	1935	1936	1937	1938	1939
Masters Tournament	NYF	NYF	NYF	NYF	5	T19	T6	3	T6	T10
U.S. Open	T17	T15	T14	CUT	T37	T21	T59	5	T50	T12
The Open Championship				T7				6		
PGA Championship		R32	SF	QF		QF	R16	R16	R32	

Tournament	1940	1941	1942	1943	1944	1945	1946	1947	1948	1949	1950
Masters Tournament	T4	5	T33	NT	NT	NT	T32	37	T18	WD	WD
U.S. Open	T10	T10	NT	NT	NT	NT	CUT				
The Open Championship	NT	NT	NT	NT	NT	NT					
PGA Championship	R16	R32	QF	NT	QF	R32		R32			

Top 10
Did not play

NYF = tournament not yet founded
NT = no tournament
WD = withdrew
CUT = missed the half-way cut
R64, R32, R16, QF, SF = round in which player lost in PGA Championship match play
"T" indicates a tie for a place

=== Summary ===
Tournament	Wins	2nd	3rd	Top-5	Top-10	Top-25	Events	Cuts made
Masters Tournament	0	0	1	4	7	9	14	12
U.S. Open	0	0	0	1	4	9	16	12
The Open Championship	0	0	0	0	2	3	3	3
PGA Championship	0	0	1	6	11	16	16	16
Totals	0	0	2	11	24	37	49	43

- Most consecutive cuts made – 29 (1933 Open Championship – 1946 Masters)
- The longest streak of top-10s – 6 (1936 PGA – 1938 Masters)
