= Southend Tournament =

Tournament information
- Location: Southend-on-Sea, England
- Established: 1937
- Course: Thorpe Hall Golf Club
- Month played: May and September
- Final year: 1937

Final champion
- Charles Whitcombe

Location in England

The Southend Tournament was a professional golf tournament played in Southend, England and sponsored by the local council. The event was held just once, in 1937, and had total prize money of £1,000. The event was unusual in that the first half of the tournament was played in May but, because of heavy rain, the final half was played in September.

== History ==
The original plan was for tournament to be played over three days, from 19 to 21 May. Heavy rain and flooded greens meant that no play was possible on the first day and the event was reduced to two days, 36 holes to be played each day with the leading 60 players competing on the final day. Paddy Mahon scored a course record 67 in the first round and led after two rounds on 139 with Charles Whitcombe a stroke behind. Henry Cotton started with a 79 and threatened to withdraw from the event but was persuaded to play in the afternoon. His score of 154 was good enough to qualify but left him 15 strokes behind the leader. Torrential overnight rain, however, meant that no play was possible on the final day and the final two rounds were postponed until September.

56 of the 60 players who made the cut reassembled on 11 September to play the final 36 holes. Cotton was one of the four players missing. In the third round Whitcombe scored 70 to take a three-stroke lead over Mahon and Jack Busson. Dai Rees equalled Mahon's course record with a 67. Whitcombe scored a steady 72 in the final round and won the event by two shots from Mahon, who scored 71. Busson had a 75 in the afternoon to drop down the field. Whitcombe took the first prize of £200 while Mahon won £100 for second place. All players who completed the 72 holes received a minimum of £6 in prize money.

Because of the delayed finish, the tournament marked the final event for the first Harry Vardon Trophy. The trophy was decided by the average score in the 7 leading stroke play tournaments. With Cotton not playing the final two rounds he finished with an average of 72. Charles Whitcombe needed to score 150 in the last two rounds to beat Cotton, while Mahon needed to score 146. On the final day, Whitcombe scored 142 to end up with an average of 71.62 to win the trophy while Mahon, scoring 145, had an average of 71.90 and finished second, with Cotton third.

== Winners ==
Year	Winner	Country	Venue	Score	Margin of victory	Runner(s)-up	Winner's share (£)	Ref
1937	Charles Whitcombe	England	Thorpe Hall Golf Club	282	2 strokes	(Republic of Ireland) Paddy Mahon	200	
