= Gerrards Cross Golf Club =

Golf club in Buckinghamshire, England

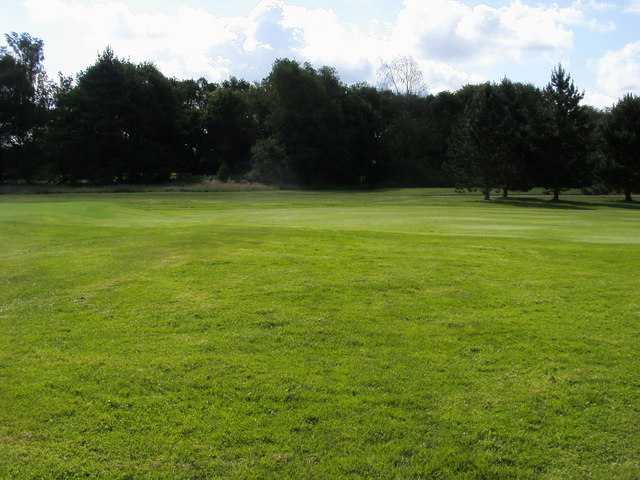

- Location within Buckinghamshire
- 51°35′52.2″N 0°32′55.6″W

Club information
- Location: Chalfont St Peter, Buckinghamshire, England
- Established: 1922
- Total holes: 18

Gerrards Cross Golf Club is a golf club, located at Chalfont Park in Chalfont St Peter, Buckinghamshire, England. It was established in 1922.
