= 1937 Ryder Cup =

Golf tournament held in England

6th Ryder Cup Matches
- Dates: 29–30 June 1937
- Venue: Southport and Ainsdale Golf Club
- Location: Southport, England
- Captains: Charles Whitcombe (Great Britain); Walter Hagen (USA)
(United Kingdom)	4	8	(United States)
- United States wins the Ryder Cup

Location map
- Location within England

The 6th Ryder Cup Matches were held 29–30 June 1937 at the Southport and Ainsdale Golf Club in Southport, England. The United States team won the competition by a score of 8 to 4 points. It was the first time that the host team lost the competition and the second of seven consecutive wins for the U.S. side. The course had hosted the event four years earlier in 1933, Britain's last win until 1957.

Due to World War II, this was the final Ryder Cup for a full decade; the series resumed in 1947 in the U.S. at Portland, Oregon.

== Format ==
The Ryder Cup is a match play event, with each match worth one point. From 1927 through 1959, the format consisted of 4 foursome (alternate shot) matches on the first day and 8 singles matches on the second day, for a total of 12 points. Therefore, 6 1/2 points were required to win the Cup. All matches were played to a maximum of 36 holes.

== Teams ==
From the start of 1937, Henry Cotton became professional to the Ashridge Golf Club and hence became eligible for selection for the British team. He had missed the 1931 edition because of a dispute and was not eligible in 1933 and 1935 because he was employed in Belgium. In April 1937, it was announced that, as in 1935, a selection committee of six would choose the Great Britain team for the 1937 Ryder Cup. In July, the team of ten was selected (as below). Charles Whitcombe was again chosen as the captain.

Team Great Britain
Name	Age	Previous Ryder Cups	Matches	W–L–H	Winning percentage
(England) Charles Whitcombe – captain	41	5	8	3–2–3	56.25
(England) Percy Alliss	40	3	4	2–1–1	62.50
(England) Dick Burton	29	1	1	0–1–0	0.00
(England) Henry Cotton	30	1	2	1–1–0	50.00
(England) Bill Cox	27	1	2	0–1–1	25.00
(England) Sam King	26	0	Rookie
(England) Arthur Lacey	33	1	1	0–1–0	0.00
(England) Alf Padgham	30	2	4	0–4–0	0.00
(England) Alf Perry	32	2	3	0–2–1	16.67
(Wales) Dai Rees	24	0	Rookie

Team USA
Name	Age	Previous Ryder Cups	Matches	W–L–H	Winning percentage
Walter Hagen	44	Non-playing captain
Ed Dudley	36	2	2	1–1–0	50.00
Ralph Guldahl	25	0	Rookie
Tony Manero	32	0	Rookie
Byron Nelson	25	0	Rookie
Henry Picard	30	1	2	2–0–0	100.00
Johnny Revolta	26	1	2	2–0–0	100.00
Gene Sarazen	35	5	10	6–2–2	70.00
Denny Shute	32	2	4	2–2–0	50.00
Horton Smith	29	4	4	3–0–1	87.50
Sam Snead	25	0	Rookie

== Tuesday's foursome matches ==
	Results
Padgham/Cotton	(United States) 4 & 2	Dudley/Nelson
Lacey/Cox	(United States) 2 & 1	Guldahl/Manero
Whitcombe/Rees	halved	Sarazen/Shute
Alliss/Burton	(United Kingdom) 2 & 1	Picard/Revolta
1 1/2	Session	2 1/2
1 1/2	Overall	2 1/2

18 hole scores: Padgham/Cotton v Dudley/Nelson: all square, Lacey/Cox: 1 up, Whitcombe/Rees v Sarazen/Shute: all square, Alliss/Burton: 3 up.

== Wednesday's singles matches ==
	Results
Alf Padgham	(United States) 8 & 7	Ralph Guldahl
Sam King	halved	Denny Shute
Dai Rees	(United Kingdom) 3 & 1	Byron Nelson
Henry Cotton	(United Kingdom) 5 & 3	Tony Manero
Percy Alliss	(United States) 1 up	Gene Sarazen
Dick Burton	(United States) 5 & 4	Sam Snead
Alf Perry	(United States) 2 & 1	Ed Dudley
Arthur Lacey	(United States) 2 & 1	Henry Picard
2 1/2	Session	5 1/2
4	Overall	8

18 hole scores: Guldahl: 6 up, King v Shute: all square, Rees: 1 up, Cotton: 2 up, Alliss: 1 up, Snead: 2 up, Dudley: 1 up, Picard: 1 up.

== Individual player records ==
Each entry refers to the win–loss–half record of the player.

=== Great Britain ===
Player	Points	Overall	Singles	Foursomes
Percy Alliss	1	1–1–0	0–1–0	1–0–0
Dick Burton	1	1–1–0	0–1–0	1–0–0
Henry Cotton	1	1–1–0	1–0–0	0–1–0
Bill Cox	0	0–1–0	0–0–0	0–1–0
Sam King	0.5	0–0–1	0–0–1	0–0–0
Arthur Lacey	0	0–2–0	0–1–0	0–1–0
Alf Padgham	0	0–2–0	0–1–0	0–1–0
Alf Perry	0	0–1–0	0–1–0	0–0–0
Dai Rees	1.5	1–0–1	1–0–0	0–0–1
Charles Whitcombe	0.5	0–0–1	0–0–0	0–0–1

=== United States ===
Player	Points	Overall	Singles	Foursomes
Ed Dudley	2	2–0–0	1–0–0	1–0–0
Ralph Guldahl	2	2–0–0	1–0–0	1–0–0
Tony Manero	1	1–1–0	0–1–0	1–0–0
Byron Nelson	1	1–1–0	0–1–0	1–0–0
Henry Picard	1	1–1–0	1–0–0	0–1–0
Johnny Revolta	0	0–1–0	0–0–0	0–1–0
Gene Sarazen	1.5	1–0–1	1–0–0	0–0–1
Denny Shute	1	0–0–2	0–0–1	0–0–1
Sam Snead	1	1–0–0	1–0–0	0–0–0

Horton Smith did not play in any matches.
