= 1933 Ryder Cup =

Golf tournament held in England

4th Ryder Cup Matches
- Dates: 26–27 June 1933
- Venue: Southport and Ainsdale Golf Club
- Location: Southport, England
- Captains: John Henry Taylor (Great Britain); Walter Hagen (USA)
(United Kingdom)	6 1/2	5 1/2	(United States)
- Great Britain wins the Ryder Cup

Location map
- Location within England

The 4th Ryder Cup Matches were held 26–27 June 1933 at the Southport and Ainsdale Golf Club in Southport, England. The Great Britain team won the competition by a score of 6 1/2–5 1/2 points, which at the time was the closest score possible other than a tie. As with the three previous events, the host team won and the series was tied at two wins each.

John Henry Taylor became only the second of three Team Great Britain captains to ever lift the Ryder Cup and was Great Britain's last Ryder Cup victory until 1957, the only post-war win until Team Europe won its first in 1985.

== Format ==
The Ryder Cup is a match play event, with each match worth one point. From 1927 through 1959, the format consisted of 4 foursome (alternate shot) matches on the first day and 8 singles matches on the second day, for a total of 12 points. Therefore, 6 1/2 points were required to win the Cup. All matches were played to a maximum of 36 holes.

== Teams ==
In February 1931, it was announced that a selection committee of six would choose the Great Britain team for the 1933 Ryder Cup. A preliminary squad of 22 was announced. Henry Cotton was not considered as he was employed in Belgium.

In early June, the team of ten was selected (as below). J.H. Taylor was to be the non-playing captain. Initially Easterbrook and Havers were called "reserves" but the distinction was ignored when choosing those who actually played in the matches.

Team Great Britain
Name	Age	Previous Ryder Cups	Matches	W–L–H	Winning percentage
(England) J.H. Taylor	62	Non-playing captain
(England) Percy Alliss	36	1	0	0–0–0
(Scotland) Allan Dailey	25	0	Rookie
(England) Bill Davies	41	1	2	1–1–0	50.00
(England) Syd Easterbrook	28	1	1	0–1–0	0.00
(England) Arthur Havers	35	2	4	1–3–0	25.00
(England) Arthur Lacey	29	0	Rookie
(England) Abe Mitchell	46	2	4	2–2–0	50.00
(England) Alf Padgham	26	0	Rookie
(England) Alf Perry	28	0	Rookie
(England) Charles Whitcombe	37	3	5	2–1–2	60.00

The American team did not arrive in the UK until 21 June. They travelled to London and arrived in Southport the following day.

Team USA
Name	Age	Previous Ryder Cups	Matches	W–L–H	Winning percentage
Walter Hagen – captain	40	3	6	5–1–0	83.33
Billy Burke	30	1	2	2–0–0	100.00
Leo Diegel	34	3	5	3–2–0	60.00
Ed Dudley	32	1	1	0–1–0	0.00
Olin Dutra	32	0	Rookie
Paul Runyan	24	0	Rookie
Gene Sarazen	31	3	6	3–2–1	58.33
Denny Shute	28	1	2	2–0–0	100.00
Horton Smith	25	2	1	1–0–0	100.00
Craig Wood	31	1	1	0–1–0	0.00

All the Americans competed in the 1933 Open Championship. They all qualified and 8 of the 10 made the cut. After the four rounds they held 5 of the 6 leading positions with Shute and Wood tying for the tead. Shute won the 36 hole play-off by 5 strokes.

== Monday's foursome matches ==
After the morning matches Great Britain led three of the four matches with the other match level. Alliss and Whitcombe had extended their lead to four after eight holes of the afternoon round. Sarazen and Hagen then won the next three holes and levelled the match at the 16th. The British pair won the 17th but Whitcombe missed a 4-foot putt at the last and the match was halved. In the final match the American pair of Dudley and Burke levelled the match after six holes of the afternoon round having been four behind at lunch. They won the 17th and halved the last to win the match.

	Results
Alliss/Whitcombe	halved	Sarazen/Hagen
Mitchell/Havers	(United Kingdom) 3 & 2	Dutra/Shute
Davies/Easterbrook	(United Kingdom) 1 up	Wood/Runyan
Padgham/Perry	(United States) 1 up	Dudley/Burke
2 1/2	Session	1 1/2
2 1/2	Overall	1 1/2

18 hole scores: Alliss/Whitcombe: 3 up, Mitchell/Haver: 4 up, Davies/Easterbrook v Wood/Runyan: all square, Padgham/Perry: 4 up.

== Tuesday's singles matches ==
Dutra was 3 up on Mitchell after 10 holes but Mitchell then won eight holes in a hole to be 5 up at lunch. At the 18th Dutra was stymied and, attempting to chip over Mitchell's ball, knocked Mitchell's ball into the hole. At lunch each team was up in three matches with the other two matches level. In the afternoon play the first two matches finished quickly with wins for Sarazen and Mitchell. Lacey and Hagen were level after 14 holes but Hagen won the next two and eventually won 2 & 1. Alliss and Havers won their matches for Great Britain and after Whitcombe lost at the 17th, all depended on the Easterbrook/Shute match. The match was all square playing the last and both players took three to reach the green. Shute's first putt was strong and he missed the return putt from 4 feet. Easterbrook had also missed his first putt but, when he holed his short second putt, Great Britain had secured the narrowest of wins. If Shute had holed his putt the match would have ended as a tie and the United States, as defending champions, would have retained the cup.

	Results
Alf Padgham	(United States) 6 & 4	Gene Sarazen
Abe Mitchell	(United Kingdom) 9 & 8	Olin Dutra
Arthur Lacey	(United States) 2 & 1	Walter Hagen
Bill Davies	(United States) 4 & 3	Craig Wood
Percy Alliss	(United Kingdom) 2 & 1	Paul Runyan
Arthur Havers	(United Kingdom) 4 & 3	Leo Diegel
Syd Easterbrook	(United Kingdom) 1 up	Denny Shute
Charles Whitcombe	(United States) 2 & 1	Horton Smith
4	Session	4
6 1/2	Overall	5 1/2

18 hole scores: Sarazen: 2 up, Mitchell: 5 up, Lacey: 1 up, Davies v Wood: all square, Alliss: 1 up, Havers v Diegel: all square, Shute: 1 up, Smith: 5 up.

== Individual player records ==
Each entry refers to the win–loss–half record of the player.

=== Great Britain ===
Player	Points	Overall	Singles	Foursomes
Percy Alliss	1.5	1–0–1	1–0–0	0–0–1
Bill Davies	1	1–1–0	0–1–0	1–0–0
Syd Easterbrook	2	2–0–0	1–0–0	1–0–0
Arthur Havers	2	2–0–0	1–0–0	1–0–0
Arthur Lacey	0	0–1–0	0–1–0	0–0–0
Abe Mitchell	2	2–0–0	1–0–0	1–0–0
Alf Padgham	0	0–2–0	0–1–0	0–1–0
Alf Perry	0	0–1–0	0–0–0	0–1–0
Charles Whitcombe	0.5	0–1–1	0–1–0	0–0–1

Allan Dailey did not play in any matches.

=== United States ===
Player	Points	Overall	Singles	Foursomes
Billy Burke	1	1–0–0	0–0–0	1–0–0
Leo Diegel	0	0–1–0	0–1–0	0–0–0
Ed Dudley	1	1–0–0	0–0–0	1–0–0
Olin Dutra	0	0–2–0	0–1–0	0–1–0
Walter Hagen	1.5	1–0–1	1–0–0	0–0–1
Paul Runyan	0	0–2–0	0–1–0	0–1–0
Gene Sarazen	1.5	1–0–1	1–0–0	0–0–1
Denny Shute	0	0–2–0	0–1–0	0–1–0
Horton Smith	1	1–0–0	1–0–0	0–0–0
Craig Wood	1	1–1–0	1–0–0	0–1–0
