= Sam King (golfer) =

English golfer (1911–2003)

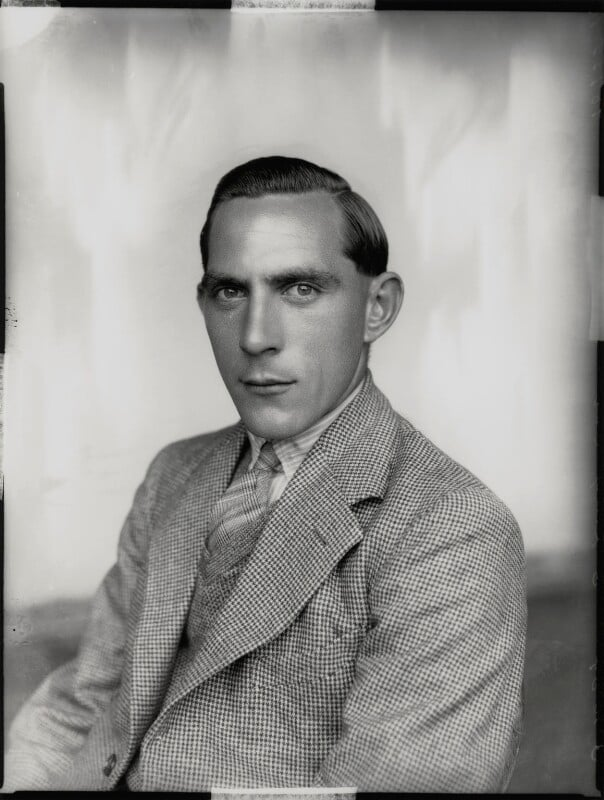
- King in 1934

Personal information
- Full name: Samuel Leonard King
- Nationality: England
- Born: 27 March 1911 Sevenoaks, Kent, England
- Died: 24 February 2003 (aged 91)

Career
- Sport: Golf
- Status: Professional
- Professional wins: 20

Best results in major championships
- Masters Tournament: DNP
- PGA Championship: DNP
- U.S. Open: DNP
- The Open Championship: T3: 1939

Samuel Leonard King (27 March 1911 – 24 February 2003) was an English professional golfer, best known for playing on three Ryder Cup teams.

== Career ==
King was born in Sevenoaks, Kent, England, a short distance from the Knole Golf Club, and lived there most of his life. His father was a charcoal burner at the Knole House Estate. King became a caddy at the club as a boy, and learned to play. By 1929, he was the assistant club professional, and began playing in local and national tournaments. In his career, King had nine top-10 finishes at The Open Championship between 1939 and 1959.

King was a member of Great Britain's 1937, 1947, and 1949 Ryder Cup teams, including scoring his team's only point in 1947. He had qualified for the 1939 team, but the event was cancelled after the outbreak of World War II. During the war, he served in the Home Guard before returning to professional golf in 1946.

King became the head professional at Knole Golf Club in 1955, and later won the PGA Seniors Championship in both 1961 and 1962. He retired in 1976 and moved to Lincolnshire.

King died at age 91 in 2003, after being hospitalized for pneumonia. He is buried at St. Peter and St. Paul's church in Seal, Kent.

== Professional wins (22) ==
=== British PGA circuit wins (6) ===
- 1933 Daily Mirror Assistants' Tournament
- 1936 Dunlop-Southern Tournament
- 1937 Daily Mail Tournament, Dunlop-Southern Tournament
- 1944 Yorkshire Evening News Tournament
- 1949 Yorkshire Evening News Tournament

=== Other wins (16) ===
- 1932 Kent Professional Championship
- 1933 Kent Professional Championship
- 1934 Kent Professional Championship
- 1935 Kent Professional Championship
- 1936 Kent Professional Championship
- 1937 Kent Professional Championship
- 1946 Kent Professional Championship
- 1947 Kent Professional Championship
- 1948 Kent Professional Championship
- 1949 Kent Professional Championship
- 1950 Kent Professional Championship
- 1951 Kent Professional Championship
- 1955 Kent Professional Championship
- 1960 Kent Professional Championship
- 1961 PGA Seniors Championship
- 1962 PGA Seniors Championship

== Results in major championships ==
Tournament	1932	1933	1934	1935	1936	1937	1938	1939
The Open Championship	CUT	CUT		T23	T28	T29	T23	T3

Tournament	1940	1941	1942	1943	1944	1945	1946	1947	1948	1949
The Open Championship	NT	NT	NT	NT	NT	NT		T6	T7	T4

Tournament	1950	1951	1952	1953	1954	1955	1956	1957	1958	1959
The Open Championship	T9	T35	T5	7	T8	CUT		T24	T30	T5

Tournament	1960	1961	1962
The Open Championship		T35	CUT

Note: King only played in The Open Championship.

Top 10
Did not play

NT = No tournament
CUT = missed the half-way cut
"T" indicates a tie for a place

== Team appearances ==
- Ryder Cup (representing Great Britain): 1937, 1947, 1949
- England–Scotland Professional Match (representing England): 1934 (winners), 1936 (winners), 1937 (winners), 1938 (winners)
- Llandudno International Golf Trophy (representing England): 1938 (winners)
