= Arthur Havers =

English golfer (1898–1980)

Arthur Gladstone Havers
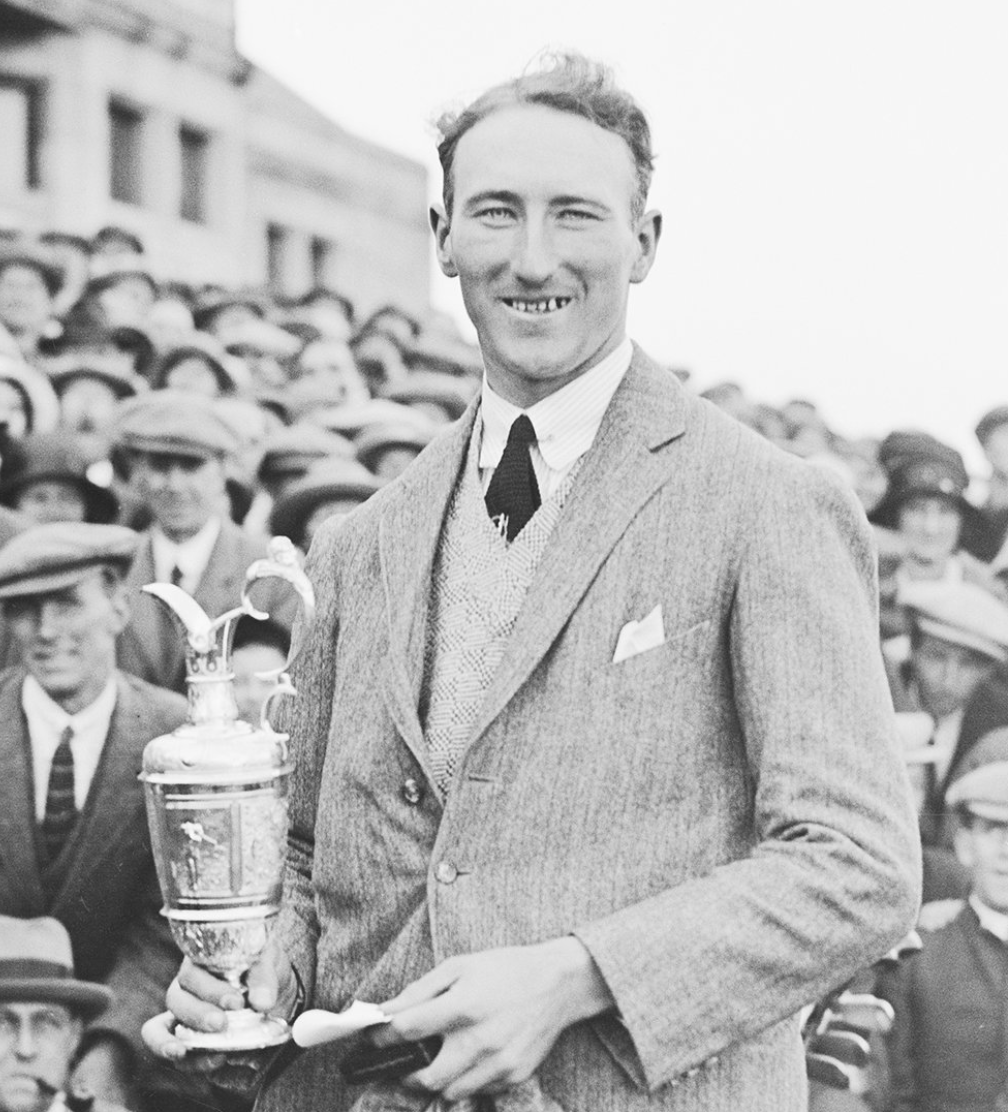
- Havers after winning the 1923 Open at Royal Troon

Personal information
- Full name: Arthur Gladstone Havers
- Nationality: England
- Born: 10 June 1898 Norwich, Norfolk, England
- Died: 27 December 1980 (aged 82) Haslemere, Surrey, England

Career
- Sport: Golf
- Status: Professional
- Professional wins: 5

Best results in major championships (wins: 1)
- Masters Tournament: DNP
- PGA Championship: DNP
- U.S. Open: T15: 1927
- The Open Championship: Won: 1923

Arthur Gladstone Havers (10 June 1898 – 27 December 1980) was an English professional golfer.

== Career ==
Havers won the 1923 Open Championship at Royal Troon and the Glasgow Herald Tournament the following week at Gleneagles, the two big successes of his career. He played in the Ryder Cup in 1927, 1931 and 1933.

Havers was born in Norwich, England. He had first qualified for the Open in 1914 at the age of sixteen. Havers was professional at Moor Park, West Lancashire, Coombe Hill, Sandy Lodge and Frinton.

== Professional wins (5) ==
- 1921 Northern Professional Championship
- 1922 Northern Professional Championship
- 1923 **Open Championship**, Glasgow Herald Tournament, Heath and Heather Tournament

Major championship win in bold.

== Major championships ==
=== Wins (1) ===
Year	Championship	54 holes	Winning score	Margin	Runner-up
1923	The Open Championship	1 shot lead	73-73-73-76=295	1 stroke	(United States) Walter Hagen

=== Results timeline ===
Tournament	1914	1915	1916	1917	1918	1919
U.S. Open				NT	NT	
The Open Championship	69	NT	NT	NT	NT	NT

Tournament	1920	1921	1922	1923	1924	1925	1926	1927	1928	1929
U.S. Open								T15		
The Open Championship	T7	4	T12	**1**	T29	T20	T28	T7	CUT	11

Tournament	1930	1931	1932	1933	1934	1935	1936	1937	1938	1939
U.S. Open		CUT								
The Open Championship		T10	3	T14		T41	60	T17	CUT	

Tournament	1940	1941	1942	1943	1944	1945	1946	1947	1948	1949
U.S. Open			NT	NT	NT	NT				
The Open Championship	NT	NT	NT	NT	NT	NT	CUT	T27		CUT

Note: Havers only played in The Open Championship and the U.S. Open.

Win
Top 10
Did not play

NT = No tournament
CUT = missed the half-way cut
"T" indicates a tie for a place

== Team appearances ==
- Great Britain vs USA (representing Great Britain): 1921 (winners), 1926 (winners)
- Ryder Cup (representing Great Britain): 1927, 1931, 1933 (winners)
- France–Great Britain Professional Match (representing Great Britain): 1929 (winners)
- England–Scotland Professional Match (representing England): 1932 (winners), 1933 (winners), 1934 (winners)
- England–Ireland Professional Match (representing England): 1932 (winners), 1933 (winners)
