= Ernest Whitcombe =

English golfer (1890–1971)

Personal information
- Full name: Ernest Robert Whitcombe
- Nationality: England
- Born: 17 October 1890 Berrow, Burnham-on-Sea, Somerset, England
- Died: 14 July 1971 (aged 80) Bury St Edmunds, Suffolk, England

Career
- Sport: Golf
- Status: Professional
- Professional wins: 10

Best results in major championships
- Masters Tournament: DNP
- PGA Championship: DNP
- U.S. Open: WD: 1931
- The Open Championship: 2nd: 1924

Achievements and awards
- Tooting Bec Cup: 1924

Ernest Robert Whitcombe (17 October 1890 – 14 July 1971) was an English professional golfer. Over the course of his career he had nine wins in professional tournaments and was runner-up in the 1924 Open Championship.

== Early life ==
Whitcombe was born in Berrow, Burnham-on-Sea, Somerset. He was the eldest of the three Whitcombe brothers who were all successful English professional golfers in the 1920s and 1930s.

== Golf career ==
He was runner-up in the 1924 Open Championship, carding rounds of 77-70-77-78=302, and finished just one shot behind Walter Hagen. The excellent 70 in round two was the best score in a single round by any competitor in the top 10. He won the Irish and Dutch Opens in 1928, the French Open in 1930 and the Irish Open again in 1935. He also won the 1924 News of the World Match Play.

== Family ==
His two younger brothers Charles and Reg were also professional golfers. Ernest played with his brother Charles in the 1929 and 1931 Ryder Cups and all three played together in the 1935 Ryder Cup. His son, Eddie Whitcombe, was also a professional golfer.

== World War I ==
During World War I he joined the Royal Field Artillery as a gunner attached to the 16th Division of Kitchener's Army. Whitcombe saw combat at Hulluch, Guillemont, Messines and Ypres and suffered slight wounds from a machine-gun burst. He was hit by a small piece of shrapnel which became lodged in his left eye—an injury which may have adversely affected his putting in later years. For his war service, he was awarded the British War Medal and the Victory Medal.

== Death and legacy ==
Whitcombe died on 14 July 1971 in Bury St Edmunds, Suffolk, England. He was one of the top English golfers in the period from 1924 through 1937.

== Professional wins ==
Note: This list may be incomplete

- 1920 West of England Professional Championship
- 1924 News of the World Match Play
- 1927 Yorkshire Evening News Tournament
- 1928 Irish Open, Dutch Open
- 1930 French Open
- 1931 Yorkshire Evening News Tournament
- 1934 Dunlop-Metropolitan Tournament
- 1935 Irish Open
- 1937 News Chronicle Tournament

== Results in major championships ==
Tournament	1911	1912	1913	1914	1915	1916	1917	1918	1919
U.S. Open							NT	NT	
The Open Championship	T33			T29	NT	NT	NT	NT	NT

Tournament	1920	1921	1922	1923	1924	1925	1926	1927	1928	1929
U.S. Open										
The Open Championship			T12	T38	2	T26		T4	CUT	

Tournament	1930	1931	1932	1933	1934	1935	1936	1937	1938	1939
U.S. Open		WD								
The Open Championship	T17	T23	CUT	T12	T9	T18		WD	19	CUT

Note: Whitcombe only played in the U.S. Open and The Open Championship.

Top 10
Did not play

NT = No tournament
WD = withdrew
CUT = missed the half-way cut
"T" indicates a tie for a place

== Team appearances ==
- Great Britain vs USA (representing Great Britain): 1926 (winners)
- Ryder Cup (representing Great Britain): 1929 (winners), 1931, 1935
- France–Great Britain Professional Match (representing Great Britain): 1929 (winners)
- England–Ireland Professional Match (representing England): 1933 (winners)
