= Bill Davies (golfer) =

English golfer

Personal information
- Full name: William Henry Davies
- Nationality: England
- Born: c. 1892 Hoylake, Cheshire, England
- Died: 25 October 1967 (aged 75) Moreton, Cheshire, England

Career
- Sport: Golf
- Status: Professional
- Professional wins: 7

Best results in major championships
- Masters Tournament: DNP
- PGA Championship: DNP
- U.S. Open: T29: 1931
- The Open Championship: T6: 1925

William Henry Davies (c. 1892 – 25 October 1967) was an English professional golfer. He finished in the top 10 in the Open Championship four times. He played in the 1931 and 1933 Ryder Cups.

== Golf career ==
Prior to World War I, Davies was professional at Hooton Park Golf Club. He entered the 1913 Open Championship at Hoylake but failed to qualify. In September that year, he reached the final stages of the News of the World Matchplay, finishing 5th in the northern section qualifying, although he lost 2&1 to Fred Leach in the first round. He won £5 for reaching the final stage.

In 1914 he won the 6th Liverpool and District Professional Championship at Leasowe Golf Club. He tied with H Cadwell on 148 but won the playoff the following day 147 to 150, winning £10 and a gold medal.

During the war he was in the Denbighshire Hussars.

After the war, he was professional at Bromborough Golf Club and then at Prenton Golf Club from 1924. In 1928 he became professional at Wallasey Golf Club in succession to Bob Kirk, Jr. He remained there until his retirement in 1964. He died on 25 October 1967 at Moreton, Cheshire.

== Professional wins ==
- 1914 Liverpool and District Professional Championship
- 1928 Ryder Tournament (joint winner with Abe Mitchell)
- 1931 Leeds Cup, Northern Professional Championship
- 1933 Dunlop-Southport Tournament
- 1935 Northern Professional Championship
- 1939 Leeds Cup

== Results in major championships ==
Tournament	1924	1925	1926	1927	1928	1929
U.S. Open						
The Open Championship	T52	T6	T36		10	T18

Tournament	1930	1931	1932	1933	1934	1935	1936	1937	1938	1939
U.S. Open		T29								
The Open Championship	T24	T7	T7	T44	T13	T34	14		CUT	T20

Tournament	1940	1941	1942	1943	1944	1945	1946
U.S. Open			NT	NT	NT	NT	
The Open Championship	NT	NT	NT	NT	NT	NT	CUT

Note: Davies only played in the U.S. Open and The Open Championship.

Top 10
Did not play

NT = No tournament
CUT = missed the half-way cut
"T" indicates a tie for a place

== Team appearances ==
- Ryder Cup (representing Great Britain): 1931, 1933 (winners)
- England–Scotland Professional Match (representing England): 1932 (winners), 1933 (winners)
- England–Ireland Professional Match (representing England): 1932 (winners), 1933 (winners)
