= Reg Whitcombe =

English golfer (1898–1957)

Personal information
- Full name: Reginald Arthur Whitcombe
- Nationality: England
- Born: 10 April 1898 Burnham-on-Sea, Somerset, England
- Died: 11 January 1957 (aged 58) Hambledon, Surrey

Career
- Sport: Golf
- Status: Professional
- Professional wins: 17

Best results in major championships (wins: 1)
- Masters Tournament: DNP
- PGA Championship: DNP
- U.S. Open: DNP
- The Open Championship: Won: 1938

Achievements and awards
- Harry Vardon Trophy: 1939

Reginald Arthur Whitcombe (10 April 1898 – 11 January 1957) was an English professional golfer.

== Career ==
Whitcombe began his career at Came Down Golf Club in Dorset and served in the British armed forces during World War I. He was the professional at Parkstone Golf Club from 1 January 1928 until his death in 1957. He finished runner up to Henry Cotton in the 1937 Open Championship at Carnoustie, and in 1938 he won the windswept Open at Royal St George's, where his two final rounds of 75–78 were still enough to beat the halfway leaders by ten strokes. His two older brothers Ernest and Charles were also professional golfers and all three played together for Great Britain in the 1935 Ryder Cup.

== Tournament wins ==
Note: This list is probably incomplete

- 1922 West of England Professional Championship
- 1931 West of England Professional Championship
- 1933 West of England Professional Championship
- 1934 Penfold-Fairhaven Tournament, Roehampton Invitation, West of England Professional Championship
- 1936 Irish Open, Dunlop-West of England Tournament
- 1937 Dunlop-West of England Tournament
- 1938 Open Championship, News Chronicle Tournament, West of England Professional Championship
- 1945 Daily Sketch Fourball Tournament (with William Anderson)
- 1946 Lotus Tournament
- 1947 Penfold Tournament (tie with Dai Rees and Norman Von Nida)
- 1948 West of England Professional Championship
- 1950 West of England Professional Championship

== Major championships ==
=== Wins (1) ===
Year	Championship	54 holes	Winning score	Margin	Runner-up
1938	The Open Championship	1 shot lead	71-71-75-78=295	2 strokes	(Scotland) Jimmy Adams

=== Results timeline ===
Tournament	1925	1926	1927	1928	1929	1930	1931	1932	1933	1934	1935	1936	1937	1938	1939
The Open Championship	T20	T14	CUT	T23	T45	T13	T17	T17	T7	T16	T34	T8	2	1	T3

Tournament	1940	1941	1942	1943	1944	1945	1946	1947	1948	1949	1950	1951
The Open Championship	NT	NT	NT	NT	NT	NT	T14	T13	T18	CUT	CUT	CUT

Note: Whitcombe only played in The Open Championship

Win
Top 10
Did not play

NT = No tournament
CUT = missed the half-way cut
"T" indicates a tie for a place

== Team appearances ==
- Ryder Cup (representing Great Britain): 1935
- Seniors vs Juniors (representing the Juniors): 1928
- England–Scotland Professional Match (representing England): 1933 (winners), 1934 (winners), 1935 (winners), 1936 (winners), 1937 (winners), 1938 (winners)
- Coronation Match (representing the Ladies and Professionals): 1937
