= Southport and Ainsdale Golf Club =

Golf club in Merseyside, England

- Location in the United Kingdom Location in Southport
- 53.605°N 3.035°W

Club information
- Location: Southport, England
- Total holes: 18
- Tournaments: The Amateur (2005), Ryder Cup (1933, 1937)

Southport and Ainsdale Golf Club is an 18-hole championship golf course in North West England, situated near the Merseyside (formerly Lancashire) towns of Southport and Ainsdale, north of Liverpool. The course is near the coast of the Irish Sea, set amongst ranges of tall sandhills and smaller sand dunes, just south of Royal Birkdale Golf Club.

Founded 120 years ago in 1906, the club hosted the Ryder Cup in 1933 and 1937. It has also staged many other notable tournaments, including the 2005 Amateur Championship with Royal Birkdale, the 2018 Bearfight Invitational, and is on the roster for Final Qualifying tournaments for The Open Championship. As of 2019, the club professional is former European Tour golfer Jim Payne.
