= Charles Whitcombe (golfer) =

English golfer (1895–1978)

Personal information
- Full name: Charles Albert Whitcombe
- Nationality: England
- Born: 21 September 1895 Berrow, Burnham-on-Sea, Somerset, England
- Died: 13 February 1978 (aged 82) Winchmore Hill, Enfield, London, England

Career
- Sport: Golf
- Status: Professional
- Professional wins: 17

Best results in major championships
- Masters Tournament: DNP
- PGA Championship: DNP
- U.S. Open: CUT: 1927
- The Open Championship: 3rd: 1935

Achievements and awards
- Harry Vardon Trophy: 1937

Charles Albert Whitcombe (21 September 1895 – 13 February 1978) was an English golfer. He was born in Berrow, Burnham-on-Sea, Somerset, the second of the three Whitcombe brothers who were all successful English professional golfers in the 1920s and 1930s and – despite never winning The Open Championship like his younger brother Reg – could be considered the most prominent of the three, winning the British PGA Matchplay Championship twice and captaining the Ryder Cup side four times.

== Career ==
Whitcombe was the head professional of Crews Hill Golf Club, until his retirement. Previous to that, Whitcombe finished fifth in The Open Championship in 1922, three shots behind the winner and beaten only by Walter Hagen, Jim Barnes, George Duncan and Jock Hutchison – the players who between them had won 8 of the previous 9 major championships. Whitcombe would enjoy several other high finishes in the Championship, beaten by players including Bobby Jones, Gene Sarazen and Henry Cotton, but only once again came as close to winning, in 1935, when he finished third, three shots behind Alf Perry at Muirfield.

Whitcombe won the British PGA Matchplay Championship in 1928 and 1930, and also won the Irish Open in 1930. Both of his Matchplay championship victories came in finals against a young Henry Cotton, by 12 years Whitcombe's junior. In 1931, 1935, and 1937 Whitcombe was selected as playing captain of the Great Britain and Ireland Ryder Cup side, having also played in every side from 1927 to 1933, and was then non-playing captain in 1949.

In 1937, Whitcombe was the first winner of the Harry Vardon Trophy, which was presented to the player with the best average in the major stroke play events.

== Tournament wins ==
- 1921 West of England Professional Championship
- 1924 Daily Mail Tournament, West of England Professional Championship
- 1926 Yorkshire Evening News Tournament
- 1927 Daily Dispatch Northern Professional Championship, Glasgow Herald Tournament, Porters Park Invitational Tournament
- 1928 News of the World Match Play, Yorkshire Evening News Tournament
- 1929 West of England Professional Championship
- 1930 News of the World Match Play, Irish Open
- 1933 Addington Foursomes (with Cameron Anderson)
- 1935 Dunlop-Southport Tournament
- 1937 Southend Tournament
- 1938 Silver King Tournament
- 1939 Penfold Professional Golf League (tie with Henry Cotton)

== Results in major championships ==
Tournament	1914	1915	1916	1917	1918	1919
U.S. Open				NT	NT	
The Open Championship	WD	NT	NT	NT	NT	NT

Tournament	1920	1921	1922	1923	1924	1925	1926	1927	1928	1929
U.S. Open								CUT		
The Open Championship			5	T6	DQ	WD	T24	6	CUT	T39

Tournament	1930	1931	1932	1933	1934	1935	1936	1937	1938	1939
U.S. Open										
The Open Championship	T9	T29	T4	CUT	T7	3	T19	4	T10	CUT

Tournament	1940	1941	1942	1943	1944	1945	1946	1947	1948
U.S. Open			NT	NT	NT	NT			
The Open Championship	NT	NT	NT	NT	NT	NT		CUT	T32

Note: Whitcombe never played in the Masters Tournament nor the PGA Championship.

Top 10
Did not play

NT = No tournament
WD = withdrew
DQ = disqualified
CUT = missed the half-way cut
"T" indicates a tie for a place

== Team appearances ==
- Ryder Cup (representing Great Britain): 1927, 1929 (winners), 1931 (captain), 1933 (winners), 1935 (captain), 1937 (captain), 1949 (non-playing captain)
- France–Great Britain Professional Match (representing Great Britain): 1929 (winners)
- England–Scotland Professional Match (representing England): 1932 (winners), 1933 (winners), 1934 (winners), 1935 (winners), 1936 (winners), 1937 (winners), 1938 (winners)
- England–Ireland Professional Match (representing England): 1933 (winners)
- Coronation Match (representing the Ladies and Professionals): 1937
