= Alf Padgham =

English professional golfer (1906–1966)

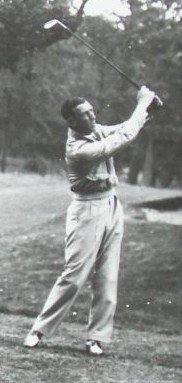
- Padgham in 1938

Personal information
- Full name: Alfred Harry Padgham
- Nationality: England
- Born: 2 July 1906 Caterham, Surrey, England, United Kingdom
- Died: 4 March 1966 (aged 59) West Wickham, Kent, England, United Kingdom

Career
- Sport: Golf
- Status: Professional
- Professional wins: 21

Best results in major championships (wins: 1)
- Masters Tournament: DNP
- PGA Championship: DNP
- U.S. Open: DNP
- The Open Championship: Won: 1936

Alfred Harry Padgham (2 July 1906 – 4 March 1966) was one of the leading British professional golfers of the 1930s and 1940s. He won the 1936 Open Championship at Royal Liverpool Golf Club in Hoylake, Merseyside, England and played for Great Britain in the Ryder Cup in 1933, 1935 and 1937. He was captain of the Professional Golfers Association in 1936.

== Early life ==
Padgham was born in Caterham, Surrey. His family had close ties to Royal Ashdown Forest Golf Club in Sussex, where he served his apprenticeship under head professional Jack Rowe.

== Career ==
As a tournament player, he came into prominence in 1931 when he won the News of the World Match Play at Royal Mid-Surrey Golf Club, beating Mark Seymour in the final and receiving £300 in prize money.

On 20 May 1933, Padgham took part in an exhibition match against Percy Alliss, as the main event at the opening of the reconstructed West course at Sundridge Park Golf Club, in the south east suburbs of London, near Sevenoaks in Kent. Members of the management committee at the Sundridge Park were impressed with Padgham's skill, so he was approached and he agreed to become the club professional, on a five-year contract, working as senior partner with present club pro Jack Randall, working in tandem. Padgham's many successes in tournament golf in the years to come, beside his work at the club, were of great delight of the club.

He will be remembered most for his remarkable sequence of five victories between the autumn of 1935 and the summer of 1936. They included the News of the World Match Play for the second time, beating Percy Alliss in the final, and The Open Championship. He also captured the championships of Ireland, Germany and Holland.

He built up slowly towards his Open Championship victory in 1936. He was fourth in 1932, seventh the following year, then third behind Henry Cotton at Sandwich and second to Alf Perry at Muirfield in 1935 before the title became his at Royal Liverpool. On the longest course yet used for The Open at 7,708 yards, he came from behind with a last round of 71 to beat Jimmy Adams by a single stroke and Cotton by another stroke. On that final day, he had to break into the locked Hoylake pro shop to retrieve his clubs for an early tee time, but seemed completely unperturbed by the incident. On the final green he holed from 12 feet for a 3 to win.

Despite seeming to be a good match-play competitor, winning the News of the World Match Play twice and once being beaten in the final by Cotton, he failed to win a single point in his three Ryder Cup appearances in 1933, 1935 and 1937.

== Personal life and retirement ==
Padgham was a tall and thin man with a natural smooth swing, a lot similar to that of the great Harry Vardon, but sometimes his putter let him down. Vardon, winner of six Open titles, had one word for Padgham's swing. He thought it "perfect". From a short, three-quarter backswing the club seemed to flow effortlessly into the ball and yet he was one of the longest hitters of his day.

Padgham was not a charismatic person, usually dressed in dark clothes, often a raincoat. He was shy and quiet and only showed his sense of humour with close friends.

He lost what might have been some of his best competitive years due to World War II. During the war, Padgham joined the full-time Special Police and part of the club house and golf course at Sundridge Park was used for military purpose. Nevertheless, in June 1940, Padgham took part in a 72-hole tournament at Sundridge Park, with gate receipts going to the Red Cross. During the 1950s and early 1960s, Padgham took part in many exhibition matches, the money going to good causes. In 1959, he was presented with a gold watch by Sundridge Park, for 25 years of service to the club. Unfortunately the watch did not go over his hand.

Whilst Padgham was absent from the club through sickness in the beginning of the 1960s, his eldest son died, which added to his suffering. He retired from the club in 1965, with failing health, and was succeeded by George Will.

Padgham died on 4 March 1966 at age 59 at his home in West Wickham, Greater London, Kent.

== Professional wins (21) ==
- 1931 News of the World Match Play
- 1932 Irish Open
- 1933 Sussex Professional Championship
- 1934 German Open, Dunlop-Southport Tournament, Yorkshire Evening News Tournament, Kent President's Cup
- 1935 News of the World Match Play
- 1936 The Open Championship, Daily Mail Tournament, Silver King Tournament, Dunlop-Southport Tournament, Western Province Open
- 1938 Dutch Open, Kent Professional Championship
- 1939 Silver King Tournament, News Chronicle Tournament
- 1946 Daily Mail Tournament
- 1947 Silver King Tournament
- 1948 Kent President's Cup
- 1954 Kent Professional Championship

== Major championships ==
=== Wins (1) ===
| Year | Championship | 54 holes | Winning score | Margin | Runner-up |
|---|---|---|---|---|---|
| 1936 | The Open Championship | 1 shot deficit | 73-72-71-71=287 | 1 stroke | (Scotland) Jimmy Adams |

=== Results timeline ===
| Tournament | 1930 | 1931 | 1932 | 1933 | 1934 | 1935 | 1936 | 1937 | 1938 | 1939 |
|---|---|---|---|---|---|---|---|---|---|---|
| The Open Championship | T39 | T40 | T4 | T7 | 3 | 2 | 1 | T7 | T4 | |

| Tournament | 1940 | 1941 | 1942 | 1943 | 1944 | 1945 | 1946 | 1947 | 1948 | 1949 |
|---|---|---|---|---|---|---|---|---|---|---|
| The Open Championship | NT | NT | NT | NT | NT | NT | T31 | T13 | T7 | CUT |

| Tournament | 1950 | 1951 | 1952 | 1953 | 1954 |
|---|---|---|---|---|---|
| The Open Championship | T20 | CUT | | CUT | CUT |

Note: Padgham only played in The Open Championship

Win
Top 10
Did not play

NT = No tournament
CUT = missed the half-way cut
"T" indicates a tie for a place

== Team appearances ==
- Ryder Cup (representing Great Britain): 1933 (winners), 1935, 1937
- England–Scotland Professional Match (representing England): 1932 (winners), 1933 (winners), 1934 (winners), 1935 (winners), 1936 (winners), 1937 (winners), 1938 (winners)
- England–Ireland Professional Match (representing England): 1932 (winners), 1933 (winners)
- Coronation Match (representing the Ladies and Professionals): 1937
- Llandudno International Golf Trophy (representing England): 1938 (winners)
