= Stewart Burns =

Scottish golfer

Personal information
- Full name: Robert Stewart Burns
- Nationality: Scotland
- Born: 11 May 1899 Stirling, Scotland

Career
- Sport: Golf
- Status: Professional
- Professional wins: 4

Best results in major championships
- Masters Tournament: DNP
- PGA Championship: DNP
- U.S. Open: DNP
- The Open Championship: 16th: 1928

Robert Stewart Burns (born 11 May 1899) was a Scottish professional golfer. He was in the team for the 1929 Ryder Cup but did not play in any matches. He was Scottish Professional Champion three times.

== Early life ==
Burns was born on 11 May 1899 in Stirling, Scotland, the son of George Burns, a gardener, and Jane. He served in the 7th Argyll and Sutherland Highlanders during World War I, having been as assistant at Stirling Golf Club before the war. His older brother James was also a professional golfer. Before the war, James had been an assistant at Stirling Golf Club and then professional at Falkirk Tryst Golf Club for six years. James also served in the 7th Argyll and Sutherland Highlanders and was killed in action on 23 April 1917 during the Second Battle of Arras.

== Golf career ==
In 1919 Burns became the professional at Falkirk Tryst Golf Club, where his brother had been the professional before the war. In 1924 he became the professional at Cruden Bay Golf Club before being attached to Hendon Golf Club, near London, from 1929 to 1933. He was then at Murrayfield Golf Club until World War II.

Burns won the Scottish Professional Championship in 1925, 1927 and 1928. In 1925 he won by 5 strokes from Tom Fernie, while in 1927 he won by 3 from Duncan McCulloch. In 1928 Burns was level with Gordon Lockhart after three rounds but a final round of 68 gave him victory by 11 strokes. His best performance in The Open Championship was at Sandwich in 1928 where he was tied for 6th place after two rounds. A third round of 75 improved his position to a tie for 5th place but a final round of 83 dropped him to 16th place.

The team for the 1929 Ryder Cup was selected in January 1929. With his performance in the 1928 Open and his three wins in the Scottish Professional Championship Burns was chosen as one of the ten-man team. It was originally planned that, as in 1927, only eight players should be used by each team, the same players being used in the foursomes and singles. However, Hagan, the American captain, wished to use all 10 of his players. This was agreed to, although Duncan, the British captain, announced that he would only play eight as originally intended. Burns and Percy Alliss were left out and did not play. Burns had performed poorly in the Frinton Invitation Tournament and the Roehampton Invitation Tournament, which had been played in the weeks before the event, although in late March he had won the Middlesex Professional Championship at Hendon, by 5 strokes.

== Tournament wins ==
- 1925 Scottish Professional Championship
- 1927 Scottish Professional Championship
- 1928 Scottish Professional Championship
- 1929 Middlesex Professional Championship

== Results in major championships ==
Tournament	1923	1924	1925	1926	1927	1928	1929	1930	1931	1932	1933	1934	1935	1936	1937
The Open Championship	T56				CUT	16	T49	T24	CUT	T62	T37				CUT

Note: Burns only played in The Open Championship.

Did not play

CUT = missed the half-way cut
"T" indicates a tie for a place

== Team appearances ==
- Ryder Cup (representing Great Britain): 1929 (winners)
- England–Scotland Professional Match (representing Scotland): 1932
