= Hector Thomson (golfer) =

Scottish golfer

Personal information
- Nationality: Scotland
- Born: 21 November 1913 Machrihanish, Argyll, Scotland
- Died: March 1988 (aged 74) Athens, Greece

Career
- Sport: Golf
- Turned professional: 1939 (unofficial); 1945 (official)

Best results in major championships (wins: 1)
- Masters Tournament: DNP
- PGA Championship: DNP
- U.S. Open: DNP
- The Open Championship: T14: 1950
- British Amateur: Won: 1936

Hector Thomson (21 November 1913 – March 1988) was a Scottish golfer. He won the 1936 Amateur Championship and was in the British Walker Cup team in 1936 and 1938. He turned professional and had some success, winning the Scottish Professional Championship in 1953.

Thomson was born in Machrihanish, Argyll, Scotland, the son of Archie Thomson, the professional at Machrihanish Golf Club. Archie qualified for the 1925 Open Championship, the last Open at Prestwick, and finished tied for 65th place, having qualified in a tie for 14th place. Archie later moved to Glasgow, where he ran a golf school.

Thomson first came to prominence when he won the Boys Amateur Championship at Glasgow Golf Club in 1931, beating Francis McGloin 5&4 in the final. Nearly 2,000 people followed the match. Thomson won the Irish Amateur Open Championship in 1934 and 1935. In 1935 he also won the Scottish Amateur beating Jack McLean 2&1 in the final. McLean had won the previous three Scottish Amateur Championships. In 1936 he won the Amateur Championship, beating the Australian Jim Ferrier by 2 holes in the final. The same year he played in the Walker Cup losing 10½–1½ to the Americans, a match in which the British team only got three halves. Thomson also played in the 1938 Walker Cup at St Andrews, a match that the British won 7–4, their first Walker Cup win after nine defeats. Thomson won both his matches.

Thomson gave up his amateur status in late 1939 to work in his father's golf school. However, he didn't give a formal notice of his decision, only giving official notice in 1945. At that point he was 31 and over the age limit of 30 to join the PGA. His situation was complicated by the fact that he worked for his father and was not affiliated to a golf club. This meant that he couldn't play in major PGA events and his appearances were limited to the Open Championship and some Scottish events, including the Northern Open and the Scottish Professional Championship where the Scottish PGA gave him permission to play. This situation continued until 1955 when he left to take up a position in Egypt.

Thomson took up a number of positions after leaving the U.K. He was first at Gezira Sporting Club in Egypt, and then at positions in Switzerland and Italy, before moving to the Glyfada Golf Club in Glyfada, Athens.

== Amateur wins ==
this list is incomplete

- 1931 Boys Amateur Championship
- 1934 Irish Amateur Open Championship
- 1935 Scottish Amateur, Irish Amateur Open Championship
- 1936 The Amateur Championship

== Professional wins ==
- 1953 Scottish Professional Championship

== Major championships ==
=== Wins (1) ===
| Year | Championship | Winning score | Runner-up |
|---|---|---|---|
| 1936 | Amateur Championship | 2 up | (Australia) Jim Ferrier |

=== Results timeline ===
| Tournament | 1935 | 1936 | 1937 | 1938 | 1939 | 1940 | 1941 | 1942 | 1943 | 1944 | 1945 | 1946 | 1947 | 1948 | 1949 | 1950 | 1951 | 1952 | 1953 | 1954 | 1955 | 1956 |
|---|---|---|---|---|---|---|---|---|---|---|---|---|---|---|---|---|---|---|---|---|---|---|
| The Open Championship | T55 | T15 | CUT | T32 | CUT | NT | NT | NT | NT | NT | NT | | | CUT | CUT | T14 | CUT | T37 | T22 | T47 | | CUT |

Note: Thomson only played in The Open Championship.

Did not play

NT = No tournament
CUT = missed the half-way cut
"T" = tied

== Team appearances ==
Amateur

- Walker Cup (representing Great Britain): 1936, 1938 (winners)
