= 1923 Open Championship =

Coordinates: 55.532°N 4.65°W

Tournament information
- Dates: 14–15 June 1923
- Location: Troon, South Ayrshire, Scotland
- Course(s): Troon Golf Club; Old Course

Statistics
- Length: 6,415 yards (5,866 m)
- Field: 88 players
- Cut: none
- Prize fund: £200
- Winner's share: £75

Champion
- (England) Arthur Havers
- 295

Location in Scotland
Location in South Ayrshire, Scotland

The 1923 Open Championship was the 58th Open Championship, held 14–15 June at Troon Golf Club in Troon, South Ayrshire, Scotland. Arthur Havers holed a bunker shot on the 72nd hole to win his only major title, one stroke ahead of defending champion Walter Hagen, who won the following year.

Under the rotation system then in place, the Open should have been held at Muirfield. However some doubt existed "as to the Honourable Company of Edinburgh Golfers being desirous of their course being used for the event" and the Championship was moved to Troon, the first Open Championship to be played there. Troon hosted the Open for the second time in 1950, the first time the Open had been held in southwest Scotland since 1925 at nearby Prestwick.

Qualifying took place on 11–12 June, Monday and Tuesday, with 18 holes on the New (Portland) Course at Troon Golf Club and 18 holes on Troon Municipal Course number 2 (now called Lochgreen). The top eighty and ties qualified. Albert Tingey Jr., Syd Wingate, and Charles Whitcombe led the field on 146; the qualifying score was 159 and 88 players advanced.

Hagen was among the eleven who just qualified on 159, while future champions Jim Barnes (1925) and Gene Sarazen (1932) both scored 160 and missed out by a stroke. After a 75 on Monday, Sarazen was in the first group out on the New Course on Tuesday morning; they had the worst of the rain and wind, and he shot 85. Sarazen, age 21, already a winner of two majors, had won the Daily Dispatch Northern Professional Championship just ten days earlier at Lytham. Six-time champion Harry Vardon was at 163; it was the first time he did not play in an Open in over thirty years. Wednesday was an idle day.

In the opening round on Thursday morning, Joe Kirkwood led with 72; after the second round that afternoon, Havers and Charles Whitcombe co-led at 146, with Hagen a stroke back. In the two-day format, there was no cut after 36 holes.

Havers carded a third consecutive 73 on Friday morning to carry a two-stroke lead over Hagen into the final round that afternoon. Hagen threatened the lead throughout the round, and when Havers found a bunker on his approach shot at the 18th it appeared as if the door was open for Hagen. Havers, however, chipped in from the bunker to post a 76 for 295. Hagen found the same bunker and needed to hole out to force a 36-hole playoff on Saturday, but his shot narrowly missed and he finished a shot behind Havers. Macdonald Smith finished a stroke behind Hagen in third place.

After his win, Havers made a tour of the United States and defeated both Bobby Jones and Gene Sarazen in match play contests.

== Venue ==
This was the first Open at Troon and its Old Course was changed significantly with the addition of sixty new banked-up bunkers. Its length was reduced slightly, from 6,439 to 6,415 yards (5,888 to 5,866 m); the 5th hole (Greenan) was reduced from 323 to 185 yards (295 to 169 m).

Hole	Name	Yards	Bogie	Hole	Name	Yards	Bogie
1	Seal	350	4	10	Sandhills	420	5
2	Black Rock	360	5	11	The Railway	315	4
3	Gyaws	385	4	12	The Fox	385	5
4	Dunure	450	5	13	Burmah	350	4
5	Greenan	185	4	14	Alton	175	3
6	Turnberry	580	6	15	Crosbie	435	5
7	Tel-el-Kebir	370	4	16	Well	560	6
8	Ailsa	120	3	17	Rabbit	220	3
9	The Monk	385	5	18	Craigend	370	4
Out		3,185	40	In		3,230	39
Source:				Total		6,415	79

== Round summaries ==
=== First round ===
Thursday, 14 June 1923 (morning)

Place	Player	Score
1	(Australia) Joe Kirkwood	72
T2	(Scotland) Tom Fernie	73
T2	(England) Arthur Havers	73
T2	(Wales) Hugh Roberts	73
5	(Scotland) Robert Scott Jr. (a)	74
T6	(England) George Buckle	75
T6	(England) Charles Gadd	75
T6	(Scotland) Jimmy McDowall	75
T9	(England) Frank Ball	76
T9	(England) Fred Collins	76
T9	(United States) Walter Hagen	76
T9	(Scotland) James MacKenzie	76

=== Second round ===
Thursday, 14 June 1923 (afternoon)

Place	Player	Score
T1	(England) Arthur Havers	73-73=146
T1	(England) Charles Whitcombe	70-76=146
3	(United States) Walter Hagen	76-71=147
4	(Scotland) Gordon Lockhart	78-71=149
5	(Scotland) Robert Scott Jr. (a)	74-76=150
T6	(Scotland) Tom Fernie	73-78=151
T6	(Australia) Joe Kirkwood	72-79=151
T6	(England) Tom Walton	77-74=151
9	(United States) Johnny Farrell	79-73=152
T10	(England) Frank Ball	76-77=153
T10	(England) Sid Brews	77-76=153
T10	(United States) Macdonald Smith	80-73=153
T10	(Scotland) Willie Watt	76-77=153

=== Third round ===
Friday, 15 June 1923 (morning)

Place	Player	Score
1	(England) Arthur Havers	73-73-73=219
T2	(Australia) Joe Kirkwood	72-79-69=220
T2	(England) Charles Whitcombe	70-76-74=220
4	(United States) Walter Hagen	76-71-74=221
5	(United States) Macdonald Smith	80-73-69=222
T6	(England) Sid Brews	77-76-72=225
T6	(Scotland) Tom Fernie	73-78-74=225
T6	(Scotland) Gordon Lockhart	78-71-76=225
T6	(Scotland) Willie Watt	70-76-74=225
T10	(England) Fred Collins	76-78-72=226
T10	(England) Abe Mitchell	77-77-72=226

=== Final round ===
Friday, 15 June 1923 (afternoon)

Place	Player	Score	Money (£)
1	(England) Arthur Havers	73-73-73-76=295	75
2	(United States) Walter Hagen	76-71-74-75=296	40
3	(United States) Macdonald Smith	80-73-69-75=297	25
4	(Australia) Joe Kirkwood	72-79-69-78=298	15
5	(Scotland) Tom Fernie	73-78-74-75=300	10
T6	(Scotland) George Duncan	79-75-74-74=302	8; 15s
T6	(England) Charles Whitcombe	70-76-74-82=302	8; 15s
T8	Herbert Jolly	79-75-75-74=303	4; 7s 6d
T8	(Scotland) James MacKenzie	76-78-74-75=303	4; 7s 6d
T8	(England) Abe Mitchell	77-77-72-77=303	4; 7s 6d
T8	(Scotland) Willie Watt	76-77-72-78=303	4; 7s 6d

Amateurs: R. Scott (307), Tolley (313), Soulby (315), Caven (325), E. Scott (328), Watson (330)
