= Scottish PGA Championship =

Tournament information
- Location: Scotland
- Established: 1907
- Course(s): Dalmahoy Golf Club (2024)
- Format: Stroke play

Current champion
- Graeme Robertson (2024)

The Scottish PGA Championship is a golf tournament played annually in Scotland since 1907. For many years the event was called the Scottish Professional Championship. It is the flagship event on the "Tartan Tour", the PGA Tour in Scotland's schedule. The 2016 event was the 100th staging of the Championship and the final event on the 2016 Tartan Tour schedule.

== History ==
=== 1907 Scottish Professional Championship ===
The 1907 Championship was held on 25 and 26 October at Panmure Golf Club, two miles west of Carnoustie. The championship was over 72 holes of medal play with 36 holes played each day. Entry was restricted to professionals born and resident in Scotland. The professionals also had to be either a member of the PGA or attached to a club. The residency rule excluded players like James Braid and Sandy Herd who were attached to English clubs. There were 44 entries. Prize money amounted to £70 of which £20 was provided by the Panmure Club. Prizes were given to the leading 6 players, the winner also receiving a gold medal. The scorer of the lowest round of the championship received £5.

John Hunter and Robert Thomson led after the first day on 150 with 52-year-old Willie Fernie, the 1883 Open Champion next on 152. On the second morning Hunter went round in 71, beating the course record by 2 shots, and giving him a six stroke lead. Hunter struggled in the final round taking 83. He took 7 at the 7th hole, where he had taken 2 in the morning, incurring a two-stroke penalty for grounding his club in a bunker. Thomson also took 83 for his last round but David Kinnell and Willie Fernie had chances to catch Hunter's total of 304. Kinnell finished a shot behind and was joined by Fernie after he took 5 at the last, needing a 4 to tie with Hunter. Prizes were distributed by the Countess of Dalhousie. Hunter received £30, the gold medal and the £5 for the lowest round. Fernie and Kinnell shared £25 for second place.

== Winners ==
Year	Winner	Country	Venue	Score	Margin of victory	Runner(s)-up	Winner's share (£)	Ref
Loch Lomond Whiskies Scottish PGA Championship
2024	Graeme Robertson (2)	Scotland	Dalmahoy	273	6 strokes	(Scotland) Chris Maclean	4,000	
2023	Graeme Robertson	Scotland	Scotscraig	267	3 strokes	(Scotland) Craig Lee	4,000	
2022	Alastair Forsyth (2)	Scotland	West Kilbride	269	Playoff	(Scotland) Paul O'Hara	4,210	
2021	Graham Fox (2)	Scotland	Deer Park	265	1 stroke	(Scotland) Craig Lee	4,500	
2020	Ross Cameron	Scotland	Deer Park	273	4 strokes	(Scotland) Graham Fox	4,250	
Scottish PGA Championship
2019	Paul O'Hara	Scotland	Downfield	277	Playoff	(Scotland) Alastair Forsyth	1,800	
M&H Logistics Scottish PGA Championship
2018	Greig Hutcheon (3)	Scotland	Gleneagles (King's)	268	1 stroke	(Scotland) Paul O'Hara (Scotland) Steven O'Hara	9,000	
2017	Chris Kelly (3)	Scotland	Gleneagles (King's)	197 +	6 strokes	(Scotland) Robert Arnott (Scotland) Greg McBain (Scotland) Paul O'Hara	9,500	
2016	Gareth Wright (2)	Wales	Gleneagles (King's)	268	Playoff	(Scotland) Paul O'Hara	9,000	
Gleneagles Scottish PGA Championship
2015	Chris Kelly (2)	Scotland	Gleneagles (King's)	139 +++	Playoff	(Scotland) Paul McKechnie	6,000	
2014	Gareth Wright	Wales	Gleneagles (King's)	265	1 stroke	(Scotland) Jason McCreadie	9,000	
2013	Greig Hutcheon (2)	Scotland	Gleneagles (King's)	267	1 stroke	(Wales) Gareth Wright	9,000	
2012	Graham Fox	Scotland	Gleneagles (King's)	269	2 strokes	(Scotland) Greig Hutcheon	8,900	
2011	Alan Lockhart	Scotland	Gleneagles (King's)	275	1 stroke	(Scotland) Christopher Currie (Scotland) Greig Hutcheon	8,600	
2010	Chris Doak	Scotland	Gleneagles (PGA Centenary)	269	Playoff	(Wales) Gareth Wright	8,250	
2009	David Orr	Scotland	Gleneagles (PGA Centenary)	278	4 strokes	(Scotland) Craig Lee	8,000	
2008	Jason McCreadie	Scotland	Gleneagles (PGA Centenary)	285	2 strokes	(Scotland) Graeme Lornie	9,000	
2007	Mark Loftus	Scotland	Gleneagles (PGA Centenary)	290	1 stroke	(Scotland) Sam Cairns (Scotland) Craig Lee	8,800	
2006	Dean Robertson	Scotland	Gleneagles (PGA Centenary)	275	Playoff	(Scotland) Craig Lee	8,800	
2005	Paul Lawrie (2)	Scotland	Gleneagles (PGA Centenary)	275	4 strokes	(Scotland) David Drysdale	8,700	
2004	Craig Ronald	Scotland	Gleneagles (PGA Centenary)	287	Playoff	(Scotland) Chris Kelly	8,800	
2003	Chris Kelly	Scotland	Gleneagles (PGA Centenary)	275	7 strokes	(Scotland) Scott Henderson	8,800	
Gleneagles Scottish Championship
2002	Fraser Mann	Scotland	Gleneagles (PGA Centenary)	280	1 stroke	(Scotland) David Orr	8,000	
2001	John Chillas (2)	Scotland	Gleneagles (PGA Centenary)	284	Playoff	(Scotland) Murray Urquhart	8,000	
2000	Alastair Forsyth	Scotland	Gleneagles (Queen's)	255	7 strokes	(Scotland) John Chillas	8,000	
Scottish PGA Championship
1999	Greig Hutcheon	Scotland	Gleneagles (Monarch's)	288	2 strokes	(Scotland) Raymond Russell	–	
1998	Colin Gillies (2)	Scotland	Newmachar	273	2 strokes	(Scotland) Alan Tait	5,000	
Tartan Special Scottish PGA Championship
1997	Gordon Law	Scotland	Downfield	284	Playoff	(Scotland) Alastair Webster	5,000	
Gillespies Scottish PGA Championship
1996	Brian Marchbank	Scotland	Dalmahoy	276	1 stroke	(England) Andrew Raitt (Scotland) Raymond Russell	13,000	
Tartan Special Scottish Professional Championship
1995	Colin Gillies	Scotland	Dalmahoy	278	1 stroke	(Scotland) Andrew Coltart	11,000	
1994	Andrew Coltart	Scotland	Dalmahoy	281	Playoff	(Scotland) Gary Orr	10,000	
1993	Sam Torrance (5)	Scotland	Dalmahoy	269	4 strokes	(Scotland) Colin Montgomerie	10,000	
Scottish Brewers Scottish Professional Championship
1992	Paul Lawrie	Scotland	Cardross	273	2 strokes	(Scotland) Mike Miller	6,000	
1991	Sam Torrance (4)	Scotland	Erskine	274	2 strokes	(Scotland) William Guy (Scotland) Stephen McAllister (Scotland) Russell Weir	5,000	
John Birnie Scottish Professional Championship
1990	Ross Drummond (4)	Scotland	Deer Park	278	1 stroke	(Scotland) Steve Martin	5,000	
1989	Ross Drummond (3)	Scotland	Musselburgh	274	1 stroke	(Scotland) Mike Miller (Scotland) Sandy Stephen	4,200	
Scotland on Sunday Scottish Professional Championship
1988	Sandy Stephen	Scotland	Haggs Castle	283	1 stroke	(Scotland) John Chillas (Scotland) Gary Collinson (Scotland) David James (Scotland) Jim White	4,200	
Alloa Scottish Professional Championship
1987	Ross Drummond (2)	Scotland	Glenbervie	268	3 strokes	(Scotland) Bernard Gallacher (Scotland) Russell Weir	7,000	
Drybrough Scottish Professional Championship
1986	Ross Drummond	Scotland	Glenbervie	270	5 strokes	(Scotland) Bill McColl	6,500	
1985	Sam Torrance (3)	Scotland	Dalmahoy	277	12 strokes	(Scotland) Robert Craig	6,000	
1984	Ian Young	Scotland	Dalmahoy	276	5 strokes	(Scotland) Andrew Oldcorn	6,000	
1983	Bernard Gallacher (5)	Scotland	Dalmahoy	276	Playoff	(Scotland) Ross Drummond	5,000	
1982	Brian Barnes (2)	Scotland	Dalmahoy	286	Playoff	(Scotland) Alistair Thomson	4,500	
1981	Brian Barnes	Scotland	Dalmahoy	275	4 strokes	(Scotland) Sam Torrance	4,000	
Rank Xerox Scottish Professional Championship
1980	Sam Torrance (2)	Scotland	East Kilbride	273	4 strokes	(Scotland) Willie Milne	3,000	
STV Scottish Professional Championship
1979	Sandy Lyle	Scotland	Glasgow Gailes	274	Playoff	(Scotland) Sam Torrance	2,500	
Rank Xerox Scottish Professional Championship
1978	Sam Torrance	Scotland	Strathaven	269	3 strokes	(Scotland) David Huish	3,000	
1977	Bernard Gallacher (4)	Scotland	Royal Burgess	282	1 stroke	(Scotland) Brian Barnes	3,000	
Usher Scottish Professional Championship
1976	John Chillas	Scotland	Haggs Castle	286	1 stroke	(Scotland) Bernard Gallacher	800	
1975	David Huish	Scotland	Duddingston	279	Playoff	(Scotland) Norman Wood	750	
1974	Bernard Gallacher (3)	Scotland	Drumpellier	276	4 strokes	(Scotland) John McTear	750	
1973	Bernard Gallacher (2)	Scotland	Kings Links	275	1 stroke	(Scotland) David Huish (Scotland) David Webster	750	
Scottish Professional Championship
1972	Harry Bannerman (2)	Scotland	Strathaven	268	10 strokes	(Scotland) Ronnie Shade	750	
1971	Bernard Gallacher	Scotland	Lundin Links	282	Playoff	(Scotland) Eric Brown	300	
1970	Ronnie Shade	Scotland	Montrose	276	Playoff	(Scotland) David Huish (Scotland) David Webster	300	
1969	Gordon Cunningham	Scotland	Machrihanish Golf Club	284	2 strokes	(Scotland) David Webster	300	
1968	Eric Brown (8)	Scotland	Monktonhall	286	1 stroke	(Scotland) John Panton		
1967	Harry Bannerman	Scotland	Montrose	279	3 strokes	(Scotland) Finlay Morris		
1966	Eric Brown (7) and John Panton (8)	Scotland; Scotland	Cruden Bay	137 ++	Tie		Shared; 500	
1965	Eric Brown (6)	Scotland	Forfar	271	6 strokes	(Scotland) Frank Rennie	250	
1964	Bobby Walker (2)	Scotland	Machrihanish Golf Club	277	2 strokes	(Scotland) Eric Brown	150	
1963	Bill Miller	Scotland	Crieff	284	1 stroke	(Scotland) Eric Brown		
1962	Eric Brown (5)	Scotland	Dunbar	283	2 strokes	(Scotland) Bobby Walker	150	
1961	Bobby Walker	Scotland	Forres golf course	271	2 strokes	(Scotland) John Panton		
1960	Eric Brown (4)	Scotland	West Kilbride	278	3 strokes	(Scotland) Hamish Ballingall (Scotland) Gregor McIntosh		
1959	John Panton (7)	Scotland	Turnberry	282	6 strokes	(Scotland) Hamish Ballingall		
1958	Eric Brown (3)	Scotland	Royal Dornoch Golf Club	286	4 strokes	(Scotland) John Panton		
1957	Eric Brown (2)	Scotland	Kilmarnock (Barassie) Golf Club	284	6 strokes	(Scotland) John Panton		
1956	Eric Brown	Scotland	Nairn Golf Club	281	6 strokes	(Scotland) John Panton		
1955	John Panton (6)	Scotland	Elie	272	2 strokes	(Scotland) Eric Brown	150	
1954	John Panton (5)	Scotland	Turnberry	283	2 strokes	(Scotland) Willie Macdonald	200	
1953	Hector Thomson	Scotland	Gullane	283	4 strokes	(Scotland) John Anderson	150	
1952	John Campbell	Scotland	Moray Golf Club	292	1 stroke	(Scotland) Bill Henderson (Scotland) John Panton	200	
1951	John Panton (4)	Scotland	Ayr Belleisle	290	1 stroke	(Scotland) Hamish Ballingall	200	
1950	John Panton (3)	Scotland	Longniddry	276	9 strokes	(Scotland) Hector Thomson	200	
1949	John Panton (2)	Scotland	Nairn Golf Club	282	7 strokes	(Scotland) Willie Macdonald	200	
1948	John Panton	Scotland	Prestwick Golf Club	299	4 strokes	(Scotland) Hamish Ballingall	205	
1947	Jimmy McCondichie	Scotland	Luffness	287	1 stroke	(Scotland) Gordon Durward (Scotland) Ian McPherson	220	
1946	William Anderson	Scotland	Nairn Golf Club	296	4 strokes	(Scotland) John Panton	100	
1940–45: No tournament due to World War II
1939	William Davis	Scotland	Inverness	295	2 strokes	(Scotland) Hamish Ballingall		
1938	Hamish Ballingall	Scotland	Lundin Links	284	2 strokes	(Scotland) Tom Haliburton (Scotland) Willie Hastings		
1937	Willie Hastings	Scotland	Kilmarnock (Barassie) Golf Club	305	1 stroke	(Scotland) Duncan McCulloch (Scotland) William Stephen (Scotland) George Templeton		
1936	Jim Forrester	Scotland	Moray Golf Club	289	5 strokes	(Scotland) George Hutton	55	
1935	Jimmy McDowall	Scotland	Longniddry	287	6 strokes	(Scotland) Willie Don	55	
1934	Mark Seymour (3)	England	Nairn Golf Club	290	2 strokes	(Scotland) Jimmy McDowall	55	
1933	Mark Seymour (2)	England	Moray Golf Club	292	5 strokes	(Scotland) Jimmy McDowall (Scotland) Willie Spark	55	
1932	Robert Dornan	Scotland	Forfar	286	12 strokes	(Scotland) Jimmy Adams	32 10s	
1931	Mark Seymour	England	Dalmahoy	300	7 strokes	(Scotland) Tom Dobson	35	
1930	Duncan McCulloch (2)	Scotland	Nairn Golf Club	294	10 strokes	(Scotland) David Houston (Scotland) Tom Wilson	60	
1929	Duncan McCulloch	Scotland	Bogside	294	3 strokes	(Scotland) Tom Dobson (Scotland) Sandy Thomson	35	
1928	Stewart Burns (3)	Scotland	Royal Aberdeen Golf Club	293	11 strokes	(Scotland) Gordon Lockhart	35	
1927	Stewart Burns (2)	Scotland	Gleneagles Hotel	300	3 strokes	(Scotland) Duncan McCulloch	40	
1926	Tom Wilson	Scotland	Bruntsfield Links	297	3 strokes	(Scotland) Arthur Butchart	40	
1925	Stewart Burns	Scotland	Moray Golf Club	297	5 strokes	(Scotland) Tom Fernie	50	
1924	Peter Robertson (2)	Scotland	Glen Golf Club	292	1 stroke	(Scotland) Willie McMinn	35	
1923	Arthur Butchart	Scotland	Western Gailes	301	7 strokes	(Scotland) T B Robertson	45	
1922	George Smith	Scotland	Gleneagles Hotel	313	1 stroke	(Scotland) Tom Fernie	60	
1921	Peter Robertson	Scotland	Gleneagles Hotel	312	3 strokes	(Scotland) Gordon Lockhart	70	
1920	Tom Fernie (4)	Scotland	Gleneagles Hotel	330	6 strokes	(Scotland) Willie Thomson	35	
1919	Tom Fernie (3)	Scotland	Monifieth	296	3 strokes	(Scotland) Laurie Auchterlonie	20	
1915–18: No tournament due to World War I
1914	Davie Watt	Scotland	Glen Golf Club	299	2 strokes	(Scotland) Willie Watt	20	
1913	Alex Marling	Scotland	Cruden Bay	227 +	1 stroke	(Scotland) Peter Robertson	25	
1912	Willie Watt	Scotland	Dunbar	298	5 strokes	(Scotland) Davie Watt	25	
1911	Edwin Sinclair	Scotland	Turnberry	309	2 strokes	(Scotland) Robert Thomson	15	
1910	Tom Fernie (2)	Scotland	Moray Golf Club	291	15 strokes	(Scotland) Willie Binnie	15	
1909	Tom Fernie	Scotland	Montrose	296	2 strokes	(Scotland) Robert Thomson	30	
1908	Robert Thomson	Scotland	Cardross	298	Playoff	(Scotland) Willie Watt	30	
1907	John Hunter	Scotland	Panmure Golf Club	304	1 stroke	(Scotland) Willie Fernie (Scotland) David Kinnell	30	

In 1908 Thomson beat Watt 146 to 153 in the 36-hole playoff. In 1970 Shade and Webster scored 70 in the 18-hole playoff with Huish scoring 73. Shade won at the next hole in a sudden-death playoff. In 1971 Gallacher beat Brown 68 to 73 in the 18-hole playoff. In 1975 Huish beat Wood at the second extra hole. In 1979 Lyle beat Torrance at the third extra hole. In 1982 Barnes beat Thomson at the second extra hole. In 1983 Gallacher beat Drummond at the second extra hole. In 1994 Coltart beat Orr at the second extra hole. In 1999 the Championship was awarded to the leading Scot in the European Tour Scottish PGA Championship. In 2001 Chillas beat Urquhart at the second extra hole. In 2004 Ronald beat Kelly at the second extra hole with a birdie. In 2006 Robertson beat Lee at the second extra hole with a birdie. In 2010 Doak beat Wright at the fourth extra hole. In 2015 Kelly beat McKechnie at the first extra hole with an eagle 3. In 2016 Wright beat O'Hara at the first extra hole with an eagle 3. In 2019 O'Hara beat Forsyth with a par at the second extra hole. In 2022 Forsyth beat O'Hara with a par at the second extra hole.

- + reduced to 54 holes. In 1913 fog meant that the morning round on the second day could not be played.
- ++ reduced to 36 holes. Brown and Panton declared joint winners after persistent haar made play impossible.
- +++ reduced to 36 holes. No play was possible on the first day because of course flooding.
