= Jim Forrester =

Scottish golfer (1908–1938)

Personal information
- Full name: James Summers Forrester
- Nationality: Scotland
- Born: 1908 Glasgow, Scotland
- Died: 23 June 1938 (aged 30) Brussels, Belgium

Career
- Sport: Golf
- Status: Professional
- Professional wins: 2

Best results in major championships
- Masters Tournament: DNP
- PGA Championship: DNP
- U.S. Open: DNP
- The Open Championship: T58: 1934

James Summers Forrester (1908 – 23 June 1938) was a Scottish professional golfer. He won the Northern Open in 1934 and the Scottish Professional Championship in 1936. In 1937 he replaced Henry Cotton at Waterloo Golf Club in Belgium but died the following year in a Belgian hospital following complications after an operation for appendicitis.

== Golf career ==
Forrester was at Balmore Golf Club, north of Glasgow from about 1925 but he became the professional at Cruden Bay in April 1932 when James Mackie left for Hunstanton. From this time Forrester was a regular competitor for Scotland in the annual international matches against England and Ireland, playing in both matches each year from 1932 to 1936.

Forrester won the 1936 Scottish Professional Championship at Moray Golf Club taking the first prize of £55. His 4-round total of 289 was 5 strokes better than runner-up George Hutton. First-day rounds of 72 and 76 put him 2 shots behind the leaders but final-day rounds of 70 and 71 put him comfortably ahead of the field.

At the start of 1937 Forrester replaced Henry Cotton at Waterloo Golf Club in Belgium. He continued to enter a few tournaments both in Britain and on the Continent.

== Death ==
In June 1938 Forrester was operated on for appendicitis but he developed an ulcer on the brain and died age just 30 in a Belgian hospital.

== Family ==
Forrester had a son, also called James Summers Forrester born in Aberdeen in early 1937. Forrester's widow emigrated to America and their son became a doctor, serving in the US Air Force, and later became a politician.

His brother Willie was also a professional golfer.

== Tournament wins ==
- 1934 Northern Open
- 1936 Scottish Professional Championship

== Results in major championships ==
| Tournament | 1934 | 1935 | 1936 | 1937 |
|---|---|---|---|---|
| The Open Championship | T58 | CUT | CUT | CUT |

Note: Forrester only played in The Open Championship.
CUT = missed the half-way cut
"T" indicates a tie for a place

== Team appearances ==
- England–Scotland Professional Match (representing Scotland): 1932, 1933, 1934, 1935, 1936
- Ireland–Scotland Professional Match (representing Scotland): 1932 (tie), 1933, 1934, 1935 (captain), 1936
