= Jimmy McDowall =

Scottish golfer

Personal information
- Full name: James McDowall
- Nationality: Scotland
- Born: 1896 Maybole, Ayrshire, Scotland
- Died: 5 November 1944 (aged 48) Ayr, Scotland

Career
- Sport: Golf
- Status: Professional
- Professional wins: 3

Best results in major championships
- Masters Tournament: DNP
- PGA Championship: DNP
- U.S. Open: DNP
- The Open Championship: T16: 1934

James McDowall (1896 – 5 November 1944) was a Scottish professional golfer. He was one of the leading Scotland-based professionals of the inter-war period, winning the Northern Open, the Dunlop-Scottish Tournament and the Scottish Professional Championship.

== Golf career ==
McDowall was an assistant at the Links Golf Club, Newmarket before World War I. He later became the professional at Williamwood Golf Club, Glasgow and then moved to Prestwick Golf Club and, in 1927, to Turnberry.

McDowall won the inaugural Northern Open in 1931 by 7 strokes. The following year he led by 7 strokes after 3 rounds but was caught on the final afternoon and lost a playoff.

McDowall also won the inaugural Dunlop-Scottish Tournament played on the King's course at Gleneagles in October 1933. This was a match-play event, the equivalent of the Scottish Professional Championship which was stroke-play. McDowall received a bye in the first round. After four rounds on the next two days, McDowall reached the final where he played Mark Seymour. Seymour had won three of the previous four Scottish Professional Championships. In the 36-hole final, McDowall was 5 up after 7 holes, although the lead was reduced to 4 holes after the opening round. In the afternoon McDowall won 6 of the first 8 holes to be dormie 10. Seymour then won the next 5 holes before a half at the 14th gave McDowall a 5&4 victory.

McDowall was runner-up in the Scottish Professional Championship in 1933 and 1934 behind Mark Seymour. In 1935 he won the event, finishing 6 strokes clear of the field and 9 ahead of Seymour.

McDowall was a regular competitor in the Open Championship, qualifying for 10 successive years from 1926 to 1935. His best finish was to be tied for 16th place in 1934. He was also a regular in the Scottish team from when the professional international matches were restarted in 1932 until 1936.

== Professional wins (3) ==
- 1931 Northern Open
- 1933 Dunlop-Scottish Tournament
- 1935 Scottish Professional Championship

== Results in major championships ==
Tournament	1923	1924	1925	1926	1927	1928	1929	1930	1931	1932	1933	1934	1935
The Open Championship	T44			T30	CUT	T37	CUT	CUT	T40	CUT	T48	T16	CUT

Note: McDowall only played in The Open Championship.

Did not play

CUT = missed the half-way cut
"T" indicates a tie for a place

== Team appearances ==
- England–Scotland Professional Match (representing Scotland): 1932, 1933, 1934, 1935, 1936
- Ireland–Scotland Professional Match (representing Scotland): 1933, 1934, 1935, 1936
