= 1928 Open Championship =

Coordinates: 51.274°N 1.367°E

Tournament information
- Dates: 9–11 May 1928
- Location: Sandwich, England
- Course: Royal St George's Golf Club

Statistics
- Length: 6,616 yards (6,050 m)
- Field: 113 players, 52 after cut
- Cut: 159
- Prize fund: £250
- Winner's share: £75

Champion
- (United States) Walter Hagen
- 292

Location in England
Location in Kent. England

The 1928 Open Championship was the 63rd Open Championship, held 9–11 May at Royal St George's Golf Club in Sandwich, England. Walter Hagen won the third of his four Open Championship titles, two strokes ahead of runner-up Gene Sarazen. It was his second triumph at Royal St George's, the site of his first Open win in 1922. It was the tenth of his eleven major titles; his second Open victory came in 1924 at Royal Liverpool.

For this year and the next, the Open was played earlier than usual, in early May, and Hagen won both. Qualifying was held on 7–8 May, Monday and Tuesday, with 18 holes at St George's and 18 holes at Prince's, and the top 100 and ties qualified. José Jurado led the qualifiers on 144, which included four Bradbeer brothers: James, Bob, Ernest, and Fred. The qualifying score was 162 and 113 players qualified.

Two-time defending champion Bobby Jones decided not to make the trip across the Atlantic this year, meaning all eyes were on other American stars. Two weeks prior, Walter Hagen played a match against Archie Compston and lost badly, 18 & 17. Realizing he needed practice, Hagen resolved to skip the parties for which he had become famous and concentrate on his game.

On Wednesday, Bill Mehlhorn opened with 71 to take the lead, with Sarazen a stroke behind. Mehlhorn had a poor 78 on the second day and José Jurado took over the lead on 145.«» Hagen and Sarazen were second on 148 with Mehlhorn and Archie Compston on 149. To make the cut, players would need to be within 14 strokes of the leader after 36 holes; it was at 159 and 52 players advanced.

On Friday morning, Hagen took the lead by a stroke from Jurado and Sarazen, two ahead of Compston. Hagen's 72 that afternoon gave him 292 and the victory, two shots ahead of Sarazen. Jurado had a disappointing 80 and dropped into a tie for sixth place. The prizes were presented by the Prince of Wales.

Six-time champion Harry Vardon, age 58, made his last cut in the Open Championship and tied for 47th. He qualified for the Open just once more, the following year.

The top 24 British-resident professionals in the final standings qualified for the Ryder Tournament in July.

== Round summaries ==
=== First round ===
Wednesday, 9 May 1928

Place	Player	Score
1	(United States) Bill Mehlhorn	71
2	(United States) Gene Sarazen	72
3	(Argentina) José Jurado	74
T4	(England) Percy Alliss	75
T4	(England) Archie Compston	75
T4	(Scotland) George Duncan	75
T4	(United States) Walter Hagen	75
T4	(England) Bill Twine	75
T4	(England) Syd Wingate	75
T10	(Scotland) Stewart Burns	76
T10	(France) Jean Gassiat	76
T10	(England) Fred Taggart	76

=== Second round ===
Thursday, 10 May 1928

Place	Player	Score
1	(Argentina) José Jurado	74-71=145
T2	(United States) Walter Hagen	75-73=148
T2	(United States) Gene Sarazen	72-76=148
T4	(England) Archie Compston	75-74=149
T4	(United States) Bill Mehlhorn	71-78=149
T6	(Scotland) Stewart Burns	76-74=150
T6	(England) Fred Taggart	76-74=150
T6	(England) Tom Williamson	77-73=150
9	(England) Percy Alliss	75-76=151
T10	(England) Aubrey Boomer	79-73=152
T10	(England) Henry Cotton	77-75=152
T10	(England) Bill Davies	78-74=152
T10	(Scotland) George Duncan	75-77=152
T10	(England) Fred Robson	79-73=152

=== Third round ===
Friday, 11 May 1928 (morning)

Place	Player	Score
1	(United States) Walter Hagen	75-73-72=220
T2	(Argentina) José Jurado	74-71-76=221
T2	(United States) Gene Sarazen	72-76-73=221
4	(England) Archie Compston	75-74-73=222
T5	(Scotland) Stewart Burns	76-74-75=225
T5	(United States) Bill Mehlhorn	71-78-76=225
T5	(England) Fred Robson	79-73-73=225
8	(England) Percy Alliss	75-76-75=226
T9	(England) Fred Taggart	76-74-77=227
T9	(England) Tom Williamson	77-73-77=227

=== Final round ===
Friday, 11 May 1928 (afternoon)

Place	Player	Score	Money (£)
1	(United States) Walter Hagen	75-73-72-72=292	75
2	(United States) Gene Sarazen	72-76-73-73=294	50
3	(England) Archie Compston	75-74-73-73=295	25
T4	(England) Percy Alliss	75-76-75-72=298	15
T4	(England) Fred Robson	79-73-73-73=298	15
T6	(England) Jim Barnes	81-73-76-71=301	10
T6	(Jersey) Aubrey Boomer	79-73-77-72=301	10
T6	(Argentina) José Jurado	74-71-76-80=301	10
9	(United States) Bill Mehlhorn	71-78-76-77=302	10
10	(England) Bill Davies	78-74-79-73=304	10

Amateurs: Perkins (307), Hezlet (309), Hope (312), R Hartley (316), Torrance (316), Evans (319)
