= Gareth Wright =

Welsh professional golfer

Personal information
- Nationality: Wales
- Born: 20 November 1981 (age 44) London, England
- Height: 6 ft 1 in (1.85 m)
- Weight: 187 lb (85 kg; 13.4 st)

Career
- Sport: Golf
- Turned professional: 2005
- Former tour: Challenge Tour
- Professional wins: 5

Best results in major championships
- Masters Tournament: DNP
- PGA Championship: DNP
- U.S. Open: DNP
- The Open Championship: T71: 2013

Gareth Wright (born 20 November 1981) is a Welsh professional golfer who made the cut at the 2013 Open Championship, one of only two Welshmen to make the cut (the other being Jamie Donaldson). He had secured his place in the 2013 Open through a playoff in final qualifying. As an amateur, Wright represented Wales in the Eisenhower Trophy as well as in the European Amateur Team Championship.

Wright is now a club pro and in 2012 won the British Club Pros' Championship.

== Professional wins (5) ==
- 2012 Glenmuir PGA Professional Championship
- 2014 Scottish PGA Championship
- 2015 PGA Play-offs
- 2016 Scottish PGA Championship
- 2018 Northern Open

== Results in major championships ==
Tournament	2013
Masters Tournament	
U.S. Open	
The Open Championship	T71
PGA Championship	

Did not play

CUT = missed the half-way cut
"T" = tied

== Team appearances ==
Amateur

- Eisenhower Trophy (representing Wales): 2004
- European Amateur Team Championship (representing Wales): 2003, 2005

Professional

- PGA Cup (representing Great Britain and Ireland): 2013 (tie), 2015 (winners)
