= Bristol Evening World Tournament =

Tournament information
- Location: Long Ashton, Bristol, England
- Established: 1932
- Course(s): Long Ashton Golf Club
- Final year: 1932

Final champion
- Abe Mitchell

The Bristol Evening World Tournament was a professional golf tournament played at Long Ashton Golf Club near Bristol, England, in May 1932 and sponsored by the Bristol Evening World newspaper. The event was held just once and was the first important professional tournament held in the West of England. Total prize money was £350.

The tournament was won by Abe Mitchell with a score of 271, a stroke ahead of Syd Easterbrook. An American, Walter Pursey was third, 12 stroke behind Mitchell. The event was noted for its exceptionally low scoring, the 271 total being a record low score for an important 72-hole tournament. Mitchell had the lowest round with his third round of 65.

== Winners ==
Year	Winners	Country	Venue	Score	Margin of victory	Runner-up	Winner's share (£)	Ref
1932	Abe Mitchell	England	Long Ashton Golf Club	271	1 stroke	(England) Syd Easterbrook	100	
