= Greig Hutcheon =

Scottish golfer

Personal information
- Nationality: Scotland
- Born: 29 March 1973 (age 53) Aberdeen, Scotland
- Height: 6 ft 1 in (1.85 m)
- Weight: 196 lb (89 kg; 14.0 st)

Career
- Sport: Golf
- Turned professional: 1991
- Current tour: European Senior Tour
- Former tours: European Tour; Challenge Tour
- Professional wins: 13

Number of wins by tour
- Challenge Tour: 3
- European Senior Tour: 1
- Other: 9

Best results in major championships
- Masters Tournament: DNP
- PGA Championship: DNP
- U.S. Open: DNP
- The Open Championship: CUT: 1998

Greig Hutcheon (born 20 March 1973) is a Scottish professional golfer. He had three victories on the Challenge Tour between 1999 and 2003. He has won both the Scottish PGA Championship and the Northern Open three times. Hutcheon has won the "Tartan Tour" Order of Merit seven times.

== Professional wins (13) ==
=== Challenge Tour wins (3) ===
No.	Date	Tournament	Winning score	Margin of victory	Runner(s)-up
1	3 Sep 1999	Formby Hall Challenge	−20 (66-70-65-67=268)	Playoff	(Scotland) Alastair Forsyth
2	6 May 2001	Credit Suisse Private Banking Open	−18 (66-70-64-66=266)	1 stroke	(Spain) Jesús María Arruti, (Germany) Kariem Baraka
3	13 Apr 2003	Panalpina Banque Commerciale du Maroc Classic	−8 (72-70-72-70=284)	2 strokes	(Scotland) Scott Drummond

Challenge Tour playoff record (1–0)

No.	Year	Tournament	Opponent	Result
1	1999	Formby Hall Challenge	(Scotland) Alastair Forsyth	Won with birdie on second extra hole

=== Other wins (9) ===
- 1999 Scottish PGA Championship
- 2010 Srixon PGA Play-offs, Northern Open
- 2013 PGA Play-offs, Scottish PGA Championship
- 2016 Northern Open
- 2018 Scottish PGA Championship
- 2022 PGA Play-offs, Northern Open

=== European Senior Tour wins (1) ===
No.	Date	Tournament	Winning score	Margin of victory	Runners-up
1	7 Sep 2024	Legends Open de France	−13 (69-70-64=203)	2 strokes	(Australia) Scott Hend, (England) Simon Khan

== Team appearances ==
- PGA Cup (representing Great Britain and Ireland): 2013, 2017 (winners), 2022
