= Ireland–Scotland Professional Match =

Tournament information
- Established: 1932
- Format: Team match play
- Month played: September/October
- Final year: 1936

Final champion
- (Republic of Ireland) Ireland

The Ireland–Scotland Professional Match was an annual men's professional golf competition between teams representing Ireland and Scotland. It was played from 1932 to 1936. The match was played on a single day with 10 players in each team who played 5 foursomes and 10 singles matches. The first match in 1932 was tied but Ireland won the next four contests.

== History ==
The two countries played a match on 18 May 1907, just before the Irish Professional Championship. On that occasion the Scottish team was weak and Ireland won by 13 matches to 4.

The 1932 match was played as a match between the Irish and Scottish PGA Associations which meant that Mark Seymour, an Englishman, played for Scotland, where he was resident, and Sydney Fairweather, a Scot who was the professional at Malone Golf Club, played for Ireland.

In 1937 the two countries played each other during the Triangular Professional Tournament while in 1938 they met as part of the Llandudno International Golf Trophy. The 1937 and 1938 matches were both won by Scotland.

== Results ==
Year	Date	Venue	Winners	Score	Ref
1932	1 October	Belvoir Park, Belfast	Tie	6–6	
1933	30 September	Dalmahoy, Edinburgh	Ireland	6–5	
1934	20 October	Castle Golf Club, Dublin	Ireland	9–5	
1935	5 October	East Renfrewshire, Glasgow	Ireland	8–5	
1936	10 October	Royal Belfast	Ireland	10–4	

== Appearances ==
The following are those who played in at least one of the five matches. Sydney Fairweather played for Scotland in the England–Scotland Professional Match in 1933, 1935, 1936 and in the Llandudno International Golf Trophy in 1938. Mark Seymour played for England in the England–Scotland Professional Match in 1932 and 1933.

=== Ireland ===
- Denis Cassidy 1936
- Jimmy Cassidy 1934, 1935
- Fred Daly 1936
- Sydney Fairweather 1932
- John Hamill 1932, 1933, 1934, 1935
- Willie Holley 1933, 1934, 1935, 1936
- Paddy Mahon 1932, 1933, 1934, 1935, 1936
- Hugh McNeill 1932
- Joe McCartney 1932, 1933, 1934, 1935, 1936
- Matt McDermott 1932
- John McKenna 1933, 1935, 1936
- Willie Nolan 1932, 1933, 1934, 1935, 1936
- Willie O'Brien 1934, 1936
- Pat O'Connor 1932, 1933, 1934, 1935, 1936
- Moses O'Neill 1933, 1934
- Ernie Patterson 1933, 1934, 1935, 1936
- Charlie Pope 1932
- Philip Stevenson 1933, 1935, 1936
- Leo Wallace 1932

=== Scotland ===
- Tom Ainslie 1936
- Joe Anderson 1932
- Willam Anderson 1936
- Willie Callum 1935
- John Campbell 1936
- William Davis 1933, 1934, 1935, 1936
- Tom Dobson 1932, 1933, 1934, 1935, 1936
- Willie Don 1935, 1936
- Robert Dornan 1932
- Gordon Durward 1934
- Walter Fenton 1932, 1933
- Jim Forrester 1932, 1933, 1934, 1935, 1936
- Tom Haliburton 1935, 1936
- David Houston 1934
- George Hutton 1936
- Gordon Lockhart 1934, 1935
- Duncan McCulloch 1932, 1933, 1934, 1935
- Jimmy McDowall 1933, 1934, 1935, 1936
- Jack McMillan 1933, 1934
- Fred Robertson 1933
- Peter Robertson 1932
- Mark Seymour 1932
- George Smith 1932
- Willie Spark 1933, 1935
- Tom Wilson 1932, 1933, 1934
