= Tom Dobson (golfer) =

Scottish golfer

Personal information
- Full name: Thomas Peter Dobson
- Nationality: Scotland
- Born: 26 December 1903 Gullane, East Lothian, Scotland
- Died: 1 September 1968 (aged 64) Newton Mearns, Renfrewshire, Scotland

Career
- Sport: Golf
- Status: Professional

Best results in major championships
- Masters Tournament: DNP
- PGA Championship: DNP
- U.S. Open: DNP
- The Open Championship: T37: 1933

Thomas Peter Dobson (26 December 1903 – 1 September 1968) was a Scottish professional golfer. He won the Scottish Amateur in 1925. As a professional he represented Scotland on many occasions in the 1930s.

== Early life ==
Dobson was born in Gullane, East Lothian in late 1903. His father was a starter at the golf course there.

== Golf career ==
Dobson was employed as a greenkeeper, and later a foreman greenkeeper, at Muirfield. Despite his employment he remained an amateur and in 1925 he won the Scottish Amateur, an event which had only started in 1922. He defeated John Caven at the 22nd hole in his semi-final and then beat Willis Mackenzie 3&2 in the final. Both Caven and Mackenzie had played in the 1922 and 1923 Walker Cup matches.

Dobson turned professional late in 1925, becoming the professional at East Renfrewshire Golf Club at Newton Mearns, south-west of Glasgow. He was runner-up in the Scottish Professional Championship in 1929 and 1931, and also runner-up in the Northern Open in 1936. When the professional internationals were restarted in 1932, Dobson was a regular for the Scottish team, playing in all the internationals up to the war, except for the 1938 England match at Royal St George's Golf Club, where he withdrew from team.

He played a number of times in the Open Championship. In 1927, he was tied for 7th at the halfway stage but rounds of 85 and 83 on the final day dropped him to 51st of the 54 who had made the cut.

== Death ==
Dobson died on 1 September 1968 in Newton Mearns, Renfrewshire, aged 65.

== Amateur wins ==
- 1925 Scottish Amateur

== Results in major championships ==
Tournament	1927	1928	1929	1930	1931	1932	1933	1934	1935	1936	1937	1938	1939	1940	1941	1942	1943	1944	1945	1946	1947
The Open Championship	51		CUT		CUT	T39	T37		T49	T53	T42			NT	NT	NT	NT	NT	NT		CUT

Note: Dobson only played in The Open Championship.

Did not play

NT = No tournament
CUT = missed the half-way cut
"T" indicates a tie for a place

== Team appearances ==
- England–Scotland Professional Match (representing Scotland): 1932, 1933, 1934, 1935, 1936, 1937
- Ireland–Scotland Professional Match (representing Scotland): 1932 (tie), 1933, 1934, 1935, 1936
- Triangular Professional Tournament (representing Scotland): 1937 (winners)
- Llandudno International Golf Trophy (representing Scotland): 1938
