= Northern Open =

Golf tournament in Scotland

Tournament information
- Location: Lossiemouth, Moray, Scotland
- Established: 1931
- Course: Moray Golf Club
- Par: 71
- Length: 6,572 yards (6,009 m)
- Tour: PGA Open Series
- Format: Stroke play
- Prize fund: £20,000
- Month played: June

Current champion
- (England) Haydn McCullen

Location map
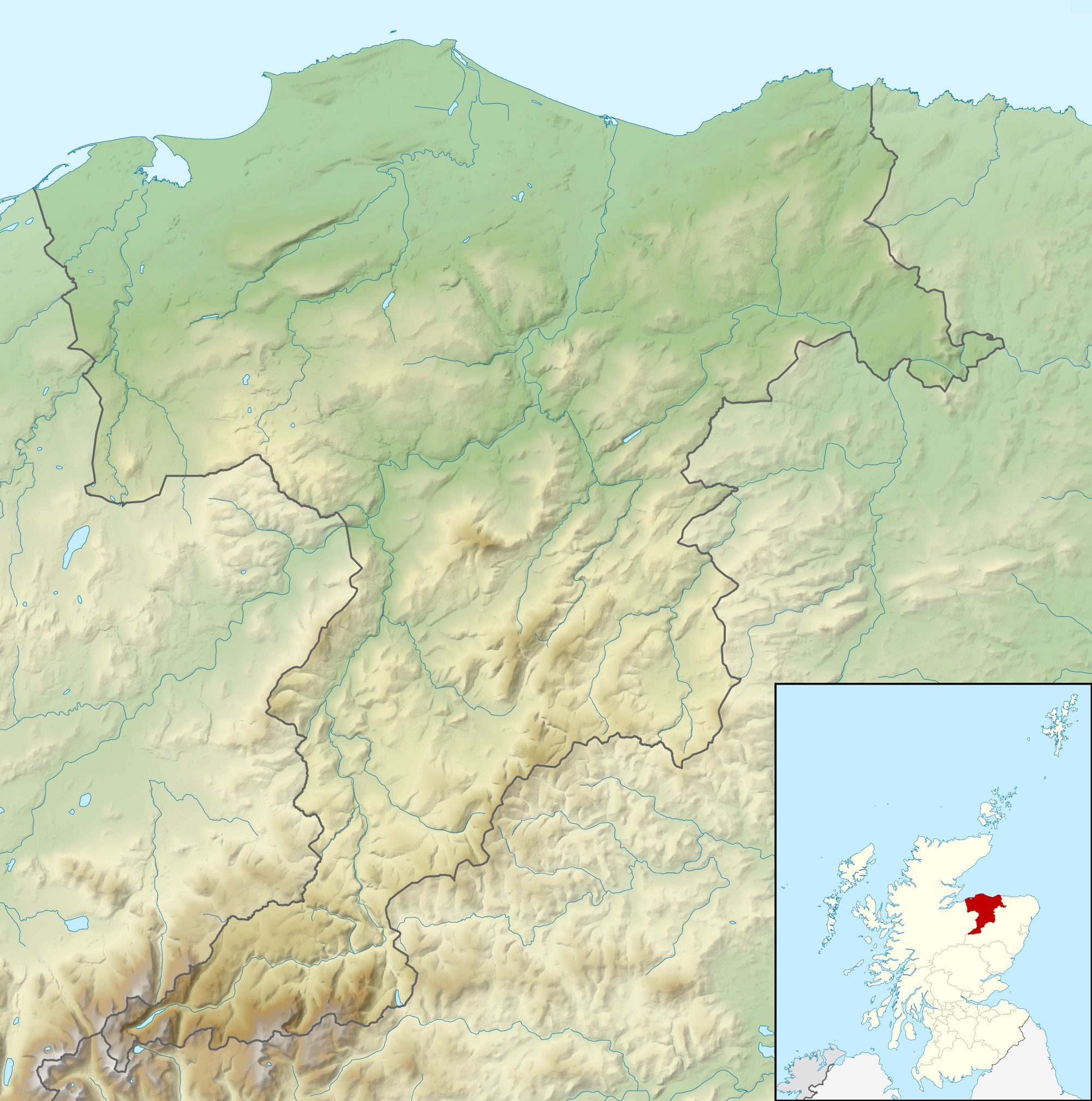
- Location in Scotland Location in Moray

The Northern Open is a golf tournament played annually in Scotland since 1931. For some years it was one of only two 72-hole tournaments on the "Tartan Tour", the PGA Tour in Scotland's schedule, the other being the Scottish PGA Championship, but since 2019 the event has been played over 36 holes.

The Scottish PGA Championship was originally called the Scottish Professional Championship and was only open to professionals while the Northern Open was also open to amateurs.

== History ==
The tournaments were originally played over 2 days with 2 rounds played each day. In 1947 the event was extended to a third day with one round played on the first two days. The leading 50 players and those tied for 50th place played two rounds on the third day. Originally called the "Northern Open Amateur and Professional Golf Tournament", the name was changed "Northern Open Championship" for 1948. The 1948 event was reduced to two days again with play in groups of three on the first day and a cut reducing the field to 80 for the final day. With a large number of entries the 1949 event was again played over three days. The playoff between Ballingall and Thomson was played at Murcar, the day after the Championship finished. The day had been allocated for Scottish qualifying for the Daily Mail Tournament. Thomson practised in the morning while Ballingall played a competitive round. The two played together in the afternoon, Ballingale scoring 72 to Thomson's 74.

== Winners ==
| Year | Tour (Note: CHA − Challenge Tour; EPT − PGA EuroPro Tour.) | Winner | Score | To par | Margin of victory | Runner(s)-up | Winner's share (£) | Venue | Ref. |
Northern Open
| 2026 | | (England) Haydn McCullen | 127 | −15 | 1 stroke | (Canada) Ethan Hurst | 3,200 | Moray | |
| 2025 | | (Scotland) Craig Lee (2) | 132 | −8 | 5 strokes | (England) Matt Ford (Scotland) Alastair Forsyth (England) Jason Freeman | 3,200 | Royal Dornoch | |
| 2024 | | (Scotland) Graeme Robertson | 137 | −3 | Playoff | (Scotland) Joe Bryce | 3,200 | Cruden Bay | |
| 2023 | | (Scotland) Graham Fox | 140 | −2 | 1 stroke | (Scotland) Paul O'Hara | 3,200 | Moray | |
| 2022 | | (Scotland) Greig Hutcheon (3) | 135 | −9 | 1 stroke | (Scotland) Chris Doak (Scotland) Cameron Marr (Scotland) Graeme Robertson | 3,200 | Portlethen | |
| 2021 | | (Scotland) Paul O'Hara (2) | 132 | −12 | 3 strokes | (Scotland) Chris Doak (Scotland) Rory Franssen (a) (Scotland) Gavin Hay | 3,000 | Portlethen | |
| 2020 | | (Scotland) Ross Cameron | 67 (Note: Shortened to 18 holes due to weather.) | | 1 stroke | (Scotland) Gavin Hay (Scotland) Scott Henderson (Scotland) David Rudd (a) (Scotland) Calum Scott (a) | 2,560 | Spey Valley | |
| 2019 | | (Scotland) Alastair Forsyth (2) | 133 | | 3 strokes | (Scotland) Graham Fox | 1,000 | Newmachar | |
| 2018 | | (Wales) Gareth Wright | 276 | | 1 stroke | (Scotland) Gavin Hay | 1,100 | Nairn Dunbar | |
| 2017 | | (Scotland) Paul O'Hara | 277 | | 7 strokes | (Scotland) Gavin Hay (Scotland) Greg McBain (Scotland) Paul McKechnie | 1,400 | Moray | |
| 2016 | | (Scotland) Greig Hutcheon (2) | 267 | | 6 strokes | (Scotland) Chris Kelly | 3,900 | Royal Dornoch | |
| 2015 | | (Scotland) Chris Kelly | 267 | | 5 strokes | (Wales) Gareth Wright | 4,250 | Cruden Bay | |
| 2014 | | (Scotland) David Law (2) | 207 (Note: Shortened to 54 holes due to weather.) | | 3 strokes | (Scotland) Greig Hutcheon | 6,000 | Murcar Links | |
| 2013 | | (Scotland) James Byrne (2) | 261 | | 1 stroke | (Scotland) David Law | 4,000 | Meldrum House | |
| 2012 | | (Scotland) James Byrne | 268 | | 5 strokes | (Scotland) David Law (Scotland) David Orr | 4,000 | Meldrum House | |
| 2011 | | (Scotland) David Law (a) | 266 | | 2 strokes | (Scotland) Stephen Gray | (4,000) | Meldrum House | |
| 2010 | | (Scotland) Greig Hutcheon | 132 (Note: Shortened to 36 holes due to weather.) | | 1 stroke | (Scotland) Scott Larkin (a) | 3,800 | Meldrum House | |
| 2009 | | (Scotland) Craig Lee | 281 | | 5 strokes | (England) Martyn Hamer | 2,500 | Spey Valley | |
| 2008 | | (Scotland) Chris Doak (2) | 274 | | 3 strokes | (Scotland) Lee Harper | 8,000 | Spey Valley | |
| 2007 | | (Scotland) Murray Urquhart | 282 | | 1 stroke | (Scotland) David Patrick | 8,000 | Skibo Castle | |
| 2006 | | (Scotland) Jason McCreadie (2) | 276 | | Playoff | (Scotland) Chris Doak | 8,000 | Skibo Castle | |
| 2005 | | (Scotland) Chris Doak | 277 | | 4 strokes | (Scotland) Dean Robertson | 7,500 | Skibo Castle | |
| 2004 | | (Scotland) Jason McCreadie | 212 | | 3 strokes | (Scotland) Scott Henderson | 4,250 | Skibo Castle | |
| 2003 | | (Scotland) Gordon Law | 275 | | Playoff | (Scotland) Colin Gillies | 4,500 | Cruden Bay | |
Grampian International Freight Northern Open
| 2002 | EPT | (Scotland) Fraser Mann | 277 | −11 | 3 strokes | (Scotland) Colin Gillies (England) Martin LeMesurier | 6,500 | Newmachar | |
Northern Open
| 2001 | | (Scotland) Graham Rankin | 203 | | Playoff | (Scotland) Mark King | 4,300 | Murcar | |
| 2000 | | (England) Jim Payne | 266 | | 1 stroke | (Germany) Ralf Geilenberg | 3,600 | Forres | |
| 1999 | | (Scotland) Alastair Forsyth | 276 | | 2 strokes | (Scotland) Craig Ronald | 3,600 | Nairn Dunbar | |
| 1998 | | (England) Lee S. James | 279 | | 2 strokes | (Scotland) Euan Little | 3,600 | Royal Aberdeen | |
| 1997 | | (Scotland) David Thomson | 267 | | 6 strokes | (Scotland) Andrew Crerar (Scotland) John Greaves (England) David Valentine | 3,750 | Elgin | |
| 1996 | | (Scotland) Scott Henderson | 281 | | 2 strokes | (England) Steven Thompson | 3,750 | Cruden Bay | |
| 1995 | | (England) Joe Higgins | 276 | | Playoff | (Scotland) Steve Martin | 3,250 | Nairn | |
| 1994 | | (Scotland) Kevin Stables (2) | 282 | | 1 stroke | (Scotland) Campbell Elliott | 3,250 | Royal Dornoch | |
Clydesdale Bank Northern Open
| 1993 | CHA | (Scotland) Kevin Stables | 278 | −6 | 1 stroke | (Scotland) William Guy | 4,250 | Nairn Dunbar | |
| 1992 | CHA | (Scotland) Peter Smith | 264 | −20 | 6 strokes | (England) Craig Cassells (Scotland) Gary Orr | 4,100 | Murcar | |
| 1991 | CHA | (England) Craig Cassells | 279 | −5 | 3 strokes | (Scotland) Frank Coutts (Scotland) Alastair Webster | 3,700 | Lossiemouth | |
Northern Open
| 1990 | | (Scotland) Colin Brooks (2) | 274 | | 3 strokes | (Scotland) Brian Barnes (England) Paul Lyons | 3,300 | Nairn Dunbar | |
| 1989 | CHA | (Scotland) Colin Brooks | 274 | −6 | 2 strokes | (Scotland) Ian Spencer | 3,300 | Cruden Bay | |
| 1988 | | (Scotland) David Huish (4) | 281 | | 1 stroke | (Scotland) Mike Miller | 3,300 | Moray | |
| 1987 | | (Scotland) Adam Hunter | 287 | | Playoff | (Scotland) Kevin Stables (England) Donald Stirling | 3,300 | Royal Aberdeen | |
| 1986 | | (Scotland) Russell Weir | 283 | | 1 stroke | (Scotland) Ross Drummond | 3,300 | Nairn | |
| 1985 | | (Scotland) Brian Barnes (2) | 274 | | 1 stroke | (Scotland) Ewen Murray | 2,500 | Elgin | |
| 1984 | | (Scotland) David Huish (3) | 281 | | 2 strokes | (Scotland) Brian Barnes | 2,500 | Murcar Links | |
| 1983 | | (England) Derrick Cooper | 287 | | 3 strokes | (Scotland) Garry Harvey (Scotland) Russell Weir | 1,750 | Royal Dornoch | |
| 1982 | | (England) Tony Minshall | 288 | | 1 stroke | (Scotland) Bill Lockie | 1,750 | Cruden Bay | |
| 1981 | | (Scotland) Alistair Thomson | 285 | | 2 strokes | (Scotland) Jim Farmer (England) Tony Minshall | 1,400 | Moray | |
| 1980 | | (Scotland) David Huish (2) | 293 | | 1 stroke | (Scotland) Jim Farmer | 1,400 | Royal Aberdeen | |
| 1979 | | (Scotland) Jim Farmer | 285 | | 5 strokes | (Scotland) Ross Drummond (Scotland) Willie Milne | 1,400 | Nairn | |
| 1978 | | (Scotland) Brian Barnes | 282 | | 2 strokes | (Scotland) Bob Jamieson | | Elgin | |
| 1977 | | (Scotland) Ewen Murray | 292 | | 5 strokes | (Scotland) David Huish (Scotland) Bill Lockie (Scotland) Hugh Stuart (a) | 1,000 | Royal Dornoch | |
| 1976 | | (Scotland) David Chillas | 289 | | 4 strokes | (Scotland) David Ingram | 1,000 | Royal Aberdeen | |
| 1975 | | (Scotland) Willie Milne (2) | 289 | | 5 strokes | (Scotland) David Webster | 1,000 | Nairn | |
| 1974 | | (Scotland) Willie Milne | 277 | | 6 strokes | (Scotland) Harry Bannerman | 1,000 | Murcar Links | |
| 1973 | | (Scotland) David Huish | 289 | | 3 strokes | (Scotland) Bernard Gallacher (England) John Garner | 500 | Royal Dornoch | |
| 1972 | | (Scotland) Harry Bannerman (3) | 286 | | 2 strokes | (Scotland) Brian Barnes | 400 | Royal Aberdeen | |
| 1971 | | (Scotland) Frank Rennie | 281 | | 6 strokes | (Scotland) Derek Small | | Nairn | |
| 1970 | | (Scotland) Sandy Pirie (a) | 215 | | 1 stroke | (Scotland) Harry Bannerman | (300) | Cruden Bay | |
| 1969 | | (Scotland) Harry Bannerman (2) | 295 | | 2 strokes | (Scotland) John Panton | 300 | Moray | |
| 1968 | | (Scotland) David Webster | 278 | | 7 strokes | (Scotland) Harry Bannerman (England) Lionel Platts | 300 | Murcar Links | |
| 1967 | | (Scotland) Harry Bannerman | 285 | | 6 strokes | (Scotland) Iain Clark | 300 | Royal Dornoch | |
| 1966 | | (Scotland) Robin Liddle | 294 | | 2 strokes | (Scotland) Marshall Douglas | 300 | Elgin | |
| 1965 | | (Scotland) Jock Brown | 139 | | 1 stroke | (Scotland) Stuart Murray (Scotland) John Panton | | Royal Aberdeen | |
| 1964 | | (Scotland) Lew Taylor | 285 | | Playoff | (Scotland) George Will | | Nairn | |
| 1963 | | (Scotland) George Will (2) | 287 | | Playoff | (Scotland) Lew Taylor | | Cruden Bay | |
| 1962 | | (Scotland) John Panton (7) | 300 | | 1 stroke | (Australia) Bob Tuohy | | Moray | |
| 1961 | | (England) Harry Weetman | 282 | | 2 strokes | (South Africa) Harold Henning | | Murcar Links | |
| 1960 | | (Scotland) John Panton (6) | 301 | | 2 strokes | (Scotland) Eric Brown | 125 | Royal Dornoch | |
| 1959 | | (Scotland) John Panton (5) | 284 | | 2 strokes | (Scotland) Ian Smith | | Peterhead | |
| 1958 | | (Scotland) George Will | 291 | | Playoff | (Scotland) Willie Macdonald (England) Harry Weetman | | Cruden Bay | |
| 1957 | | (Scotland) Eric Brown (5) | 290 | | 6 strokes | (Scotland) John Panton | | Nairn | |
| 1956 | | (Scotland) John Panton (4) | 290 | | Playoff | (Scotland) Eric Brown | | Moray | |
| 1955 | | (Scotland) Eric Brown (4) | 283 | | Playoff | (Scotland) John Panton | | Murcar Links | |
| 1954 | | (Scotland) Eric Brown (3) | 307 | | 2 strokes | (Scotland) Gregor McIntosh | | Royal Dornoch | |
| 1953 | | (Scotland) Eric Brown (2) | 281 | | 1 stroke | (Scotland) John Panton | | Cruden Bay | |
| 1952 | | (Scotland) John Panton (3) | 289 | | 5 strokes | (Scotland) John Campbell | 90 | Royal Aberdeen | |
| 1951 | | (Scotland) John Panton (2) | 285 | | 5 strokes | (Scotland) Hector Thomson | | Nairn | |
| 1950 | | (Scotland) Eric Brown | 294 | | 1 stroke | (Scotland) John Panton | | Moray | |
| 1949 | | (Scotland) Hamish Ballingall (2) | 296 | | Playoff | (Scotland) Hector Thomson | | Royal Aberdeen; Murcar Links | |
| 1948 | | (Scotland) John Panton | 288 | | 3 strokes | (Scotland) Hamish Ballingall (Scotland) Sandy Sinclair (a) | 65 | Inverness | |
| 1947 | | (Scotland) Hamish Ballingall | 300 | | 6 strokes | (Scotland) Hugh Watt | 60 | Peterhead | |
| 1946 | | (Scotland) Willie Forrester | 305 | | 2 strokes | (Scotland) Ian Macpherson | 35 | Murcar Links | |
1940–1945: No tournament due to World War II
| 1939 | | (Scotland) Jack McLean (3) | 285 | | Playoff | (Scotland) Hector Thomson (a) | 30 | Nairn | |
| 1938 | | (Scotland) Tom Haliburton | 294 | | 1 stroke | (Scotland) Wilie Don | 28 | Peterhead | |
| 1937 | | (Scotland) Jack McLean (2) | 294 | | Playoff | (Scotland) Gordon Durward | 25 | Moray | |
| 1936 | | (Scotland) Dick Walker (a) (2) | 290 | | 10 strokes | (Scotland) Tom Dobson (Scotland) Willie Don | (25) | Deeside | |
| 1935 | | (Scotland) Dick Walker (a) | 298 | | Playoff | (Scotland) Willie Spark | (25) | Royal Dornoch | |
| 1934 | | (Scotland) Jim Forrester | 287 | | 6 strokes | (Scotland) Ken Forbes (a) | 25 | Inverness | |
| 1933 | | (Scotland) Jack McLean (a) | 294 | | 1 stroke | (Scotland) Jack McMillan | (20) | Murcar Links | |
| 1932 | | (Scotland) James Henderson | 292 | | Playoff | (Scotland) Jimmy McDowall | 20 | Nairn | |
| 1931 | | (Scotland) Jimmy McDowall | 289 | | 7 strokes | (Scotland) Julian Jaffray | 20 | Royal Aberdeen | |
