= Duncan McCulloch =

Scottish golfer (1893–1968)

Personal information
- Nationality: Scotland
- Born: 1893 Troon, Ayrshire, Scotland
- Died: 1968 (aged 75) Ayrshire, Scotland

Career
- Sport: Golf
- Status: Professional
- Professional wins: 2

Best results in major championships
- Masters Tournament: DNP
- PGA Championship: DNP
- U.S. Open: DNP
- The Open Championship: 18th: 1928

Duncan McCulloch (1893–1968) was one of the leading Scottish-based professional golfers of the inter-war period. He was Scottish Professional Champion in 1929 and 1930.

== Early life ==
McCulloch was born in Troon, Scotland on 31 January 1893 to John McCulloch and his wife Flora nee McMillan.

== Golf career ==
McCulloch was an assistant to George Duncan at Hanger Hill Golf Club, London for three years before World War I. After the war, he returned to Troon and worked as a club-maker at Troon Municipal. In the 1923 Scottish Professional Championship, he had led after the first day and finished tied for third place. McCulloch was appointed the professional at Troon Golf Club in 1924 on the retirement of Willie Fernie. McCulloch remained at Troon until retiring in 1953.

McCulloch won the Scottish Professional Championship in 1929 and 1930. He was also runner-up in 1927 and 1937. He qualified for The Open Championship 11 times between 1923 and 1935. His best finish was at Sandwich in 1928 where he was tied for 18th place. In the 1925 Open at Prestwick, he was tied for 7th place after the first day but dropped into a tie for 20th after a disappointing second day.

== Tournament wins ==
- 1929 Scottish Professional Championship
- 1930 Scottish Professional Championship

== Results in major championships ==
Tournament	1923	1924	1925	1926	1927	1928	1929	1930	1931	1932	1933	1934	1935
The Open Championship	T66		T20	CUT	27	T18	CUT	T30	T29	CUT		T31	CUT

Note: McCulloch only played in The Open Championship.

Did not play

CUT = missed the half-way cut
"T" indicates a tie for a place

== Team appearances ==
- England–Scotland Professional Match (representing Scotland): 1932, 1933, 1934, 1935, 1936, 1937
- Ireland–Scotland Professional Match (representing Scotland): 1932 (tie), 1933, 1934, 1935
