= Failand =

Village in Somerset, England

Coordinates: 51.4392°N 2.6905°W

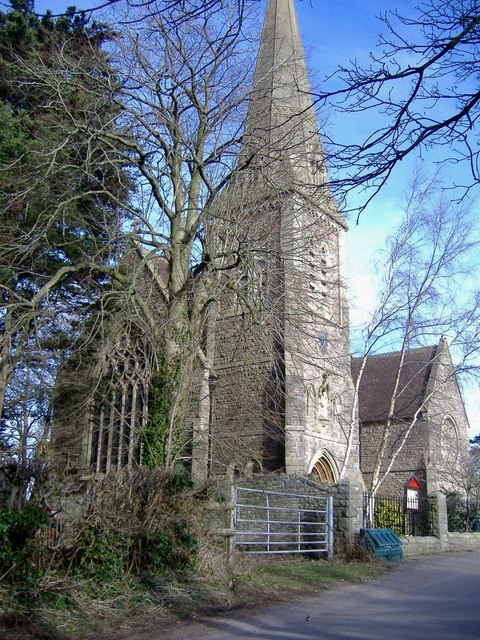
- St Bartholomew's, Lower Failand

- Location within Somerset
- OS grid reference: ST525715
- Civil parish: Wraxall and Failand
- Unitary authority: North Somerset
- Ceremonial county: Somerset
- Region: South West
- Country: England
- Sovereign state: United Kingdom
- Post town: BRISTOL
- Postcode district: BS8
- Dialling code: 01275
- Police: Avon and Somerset
- Fire: Avon
- Ambulance: South Western
- UK Parliament: North Somerset

Failand is a village in Somerset, England. It lies within the civil parish of Wraxall and Failand and the unitary authority area of North Somerset.

The village has two separate parts. Failand itself is on the B3128 Bristol to Clevedon road, and is the newer and larger part. Lower Failand, a mile away, is the original village (shown as Fayland on old maps). Lower Failand can be reached by single track lanes only.

Failand is home to a general store, a pub (The Failand Inn), an observatory, a church and a well used village hall.

== Landmarks ==
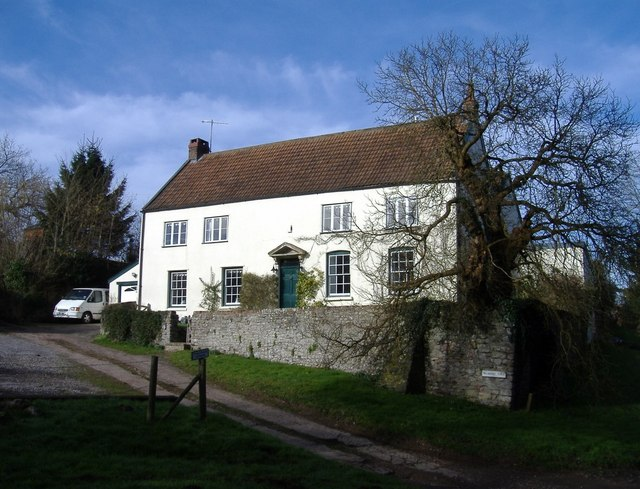
Mulberry farm, Lower Failand

Tyntesfield is a gothic house and estate acquired by the National Trust in 2002 after a national fund-raising campaign. It has now been restored, and is open to visitors. It has been designated as a Grade I listed building. The entrance is just west of Failand on the B3128.

The Anglican parish church of St Bartholomew in Lower Failand was built in 1883-1887 by E. W. Barnes of Bristol.

== Art ==
Richard Long, the Turner Prize winning Land Artist, is a longtime resident of Lower Failand. Roger Fry, a prominent member of the Bloomsbury Group, grew up in Lower Failand.

== Social ==
Failand has a very active village social life. The Failand Society meets regularly for talks and social events. There is a very active drama group who perform regularly at the village hall. The Failanders Club puts on events for older residents. There are also two active supper clubs where residents meet up.

== Transport ==
Despite being a rural village, Failand is very close to Bristol, and Clifton in particular. Clifton village is only 5 minutes' drive from Failand, via Clifton Suspension Bridge. The X6 bus runs to Bristol city centre about once per hour, via Clarken Combe, Bower Ashton and Hotwells. Lower Failand is on the National Cycle Network. Route 334 provides links to Clifton in one direction, and Portbury and Portishead in the other, linking to routes North and South.

== Sport ==
Failand is home to the playing fields of several Bristol schools, most notably Bristol Grammar School, Bristol Cathedral School, Clifton College, and Queen Elizabeth's Hospital (QEH), whose facilities were previously used by Bristol City F.C. as their training ground. Their purpose-built training facility, the Robins High Performance Centre, opened on land adjacent to QEH in 2021 and also hosts regular U18, U21 (and some Bristol City Women) fixtures. It is also home to the playing fields of the Old Bristolians Society.

Failand has its own cricket club, Failand and Portbury Cricket Club, who play on Horse Race Lane in Lower Failand.

Failand has a long-established Table Tennis Club which provides opportunities to play and receive coaching for social and competitive members of all ages and skill levels.

=== Golf ===
There are two golf clubs in Failand, namely Bristol & Clifton Golf Club and Long Ashton Golf Club. The courses have played host to numerous elite tournaments, including the Martini International, the Coca-Cola Young Professionals' Championship, the Bristol Evening World Tournament.

Long Ashton Golf Club was opened in 1893 as a nine-hole course before being expanded to 18 holes in 1905. Several members have gone on to have successful careers as professional golfers, including Chris Wood, Andrew Sherborne and Kitrina Douglas.

Bristol & Clifton Golf Club was founded in 1891 with the intention of building a course on Purdown before opting for Failand when their preferred land became unavailable. Like Long Ashton, the course had only nine holes before being extended to 18 in 1895. Further redesign took place when part of the course was taken over during World War II for use as a POW Camp.

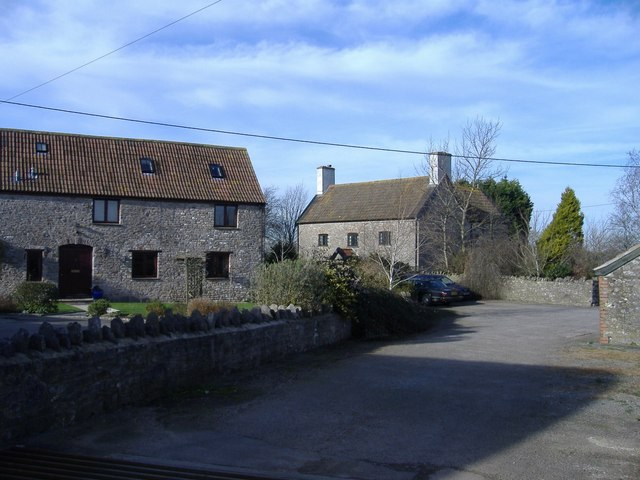
Manor farm, Failand
