= Alastair Forsyth =

Scottish golfer

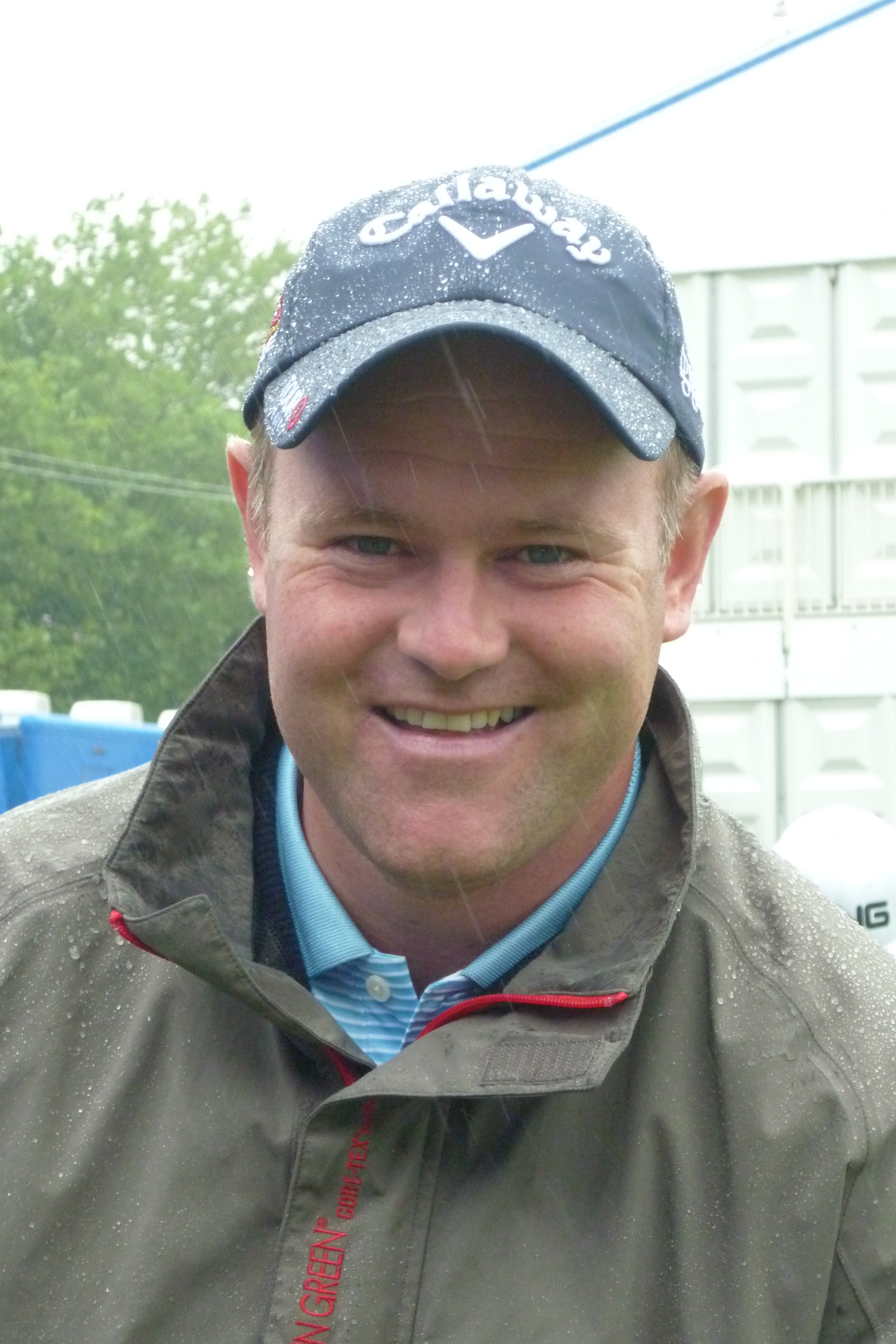

Personal information
- Full name: Alastair Forsyth
- Nationality: Scotland
- Born: 5 February 1976 (age 50) Glasgow, Scotland
- Height: 6 ft 2 in (1.88 m)
- Weight: 196 lb (89 kg; 14.0 st)

Career
- Sport: Golf
- Turned professional: 1998
- Former tour: European Tour
- Professional wins: 11
- Highest ranking: 83 (10 August 2008)

Number of wins by tour
- European Tour: 2
- Asian Tour: 1
- Other: 9

Best results in major championships
- Masters Tournament: DNP
- PGA Championship: T9: 2008
- U.S. Open: T60: 2008
- The Open Championship: T47: 2004

Alastair Forsyth (born 5 February 1976) is a Scottish professional golfer.

== Amateur career ==
Forsyth was born in Glasgow, Scotland and grew up supporting Rangers. He was a member of a winning Great Britain & Ireland Jacques Léglise Trophy team in 1994 and he won the 1996 Scottish Amateur Stroke Play Championship.

== Professional career ==
Forsyth turned professional in 1998. He won the MasterCard Tour Order of Merit in 1999, having won the St Omer Open Championship (not a European Tour event at the time) during the season.

Forsyth has played on the European Tour since 2000, after being medalist at the qualifying school in 1999. In his debut season, he just missed out on the Sir Henry Cotton Rookie of the Year award, which went to England's Ian Poulter. His best season to date was 2003, when he finished 19th on the European Tour Order of Merit. His first tour victory came at the 2002 Carlsberg Malaysian Open and his second came at the 2008 Madeira Islands Open BPI - Portugal.

In May 2008, he overtook Colin Montgomerie to become the highest ranked Scottish player on the Official World Golf Rankings. He tied for ninth place in the 2008 PGA Championship.

== Amateur wins ==
- 1996 Scottish Amateur Stroke Play Championship

== Professional wins (11) ==
=== European Tour wins (2) ===
No.	Date	Tournament	Winning score	Margin of victory	Runner-up
1	3 Mar 2002	Carlsberg Malaysian Open^{1}	−17 (63-65-69-70=267)	Playoff	(Australia) Stephen Leaney
2	23 Mar 2008	Madeira Islands Open BPI - Portugal	−15 (70-70-66-67=273)	Playoff	(South Africa) Hennie Otto

^{1}Co-sanctioned by the Asian PGA Tour

European Tour playoff record (2–1)

No.	Year	Tournament	Opponent(s)	Result
1	2002	Carlsberg Malaysian Open	(Australia) Stephen Leaney	Won with birdie on second extra hole
2	2008	Madeira Islands Open BPI - Portugal	(South Africa) Hennie Otto	Won with birdie on first extra hole
3	2008	Estoril Open de Portugal	(France) Grégory Bourdy, (England) David Howell	Bourdy won with birdie on third extra hole Forsyth eliminated by par on second hole

=== MasterCard Tour wins (1) ===
No.	Date	Tournament	Winning score	Margin of victory	Runner-up
1	15 Jun 1999	St Omer Open	−13 (73-70-69-67=279)	1 stroke	(France) Anthony Grenier

=== Other wins (8) ===
- 1998 Scottish Under-25 Championship, Kilspindie Assistants Autumn Classic
- 1999 Northern Open, Scottish Assistants' Championship
- 2000 Scottish PGA Championship
- 2019 Northern Open, Titleist & FootJoy PGA Professional Championship
- 2022 Scottish PGA Championship

== Playoff record ==
Challenge Tour playoff record (0–1)

No.	Year	Tournament	Opponent	Result
1	1999	Formby Hall Challenge	(Scotland) Greig Hutcheon	Lost to birdie on second extra hole

== Results in major championships ==
Tournament	2003	2004	2005	2006	2007	2008	2009
U.S. Open						T60	
The Open Championship	T59	T47	CUT		T67		
PGA Championship	CUT					T9	79

Note: Forsyth never played in the Masters Tournament.

Top 10
Did not play

CUT = missed the half-way cut
"T" = tied

== Results in World Golf Championships ==
Tournament	2003
Match Play	
Championship	T40
Invitational	

Did not play

"T" = Tied

== Team appearances ==
Amateur

- Jacques Léglise Trophy (representing Great Britain and Ireland): 1994 (winners)
- European Youths' Team Championship (representing Scotland): 1996 (winners)
- European Amateur Team Championship (representing Scotland): 1997

Professional

- World Cup (representing Scotland): 2002, 2003, 2004, 2008, 2009
- PGA Cup (representing Great Britain and Ireland): 2019

== See also ==
- 2013 European Tour Qualifying School graduates
