= Roehampton Invitation Tournament =

Tournament information
- Location: London, England
- Established: 1920
- Course: Roehampton Club
- Month played: April
- Final year: 1935

Final champion
- Archie Compston

The Roehampton Invitation Tournament was a British golf tournament played each April at the Roehampton Club from 1920 to 1935. From 1922 the tournament was played over three days. There was 36 holes of stroke play on the first day with the leading 16 players qualifying for a knock-out contest on the following two days. Except in 1920 the total prize money was £200. A challenge cup was awarded to the winner to remain the absolute property of any player who won the tournament on two occasions, not necessarily consecutive. Three players won the cup outright: Abe Mitchell (1926 and 1927), Mark Seymour (1930 and 1932) and Archie Compston (1929 and 1935). The tournament was cancelled in 1936 because of "the crowded state of the fixture list".

== History ==
The first tournament was played on 28 April 1920 and was a 36-hole stroke play competition with total prize money of £150. The winner was George Duncan who won the £45 first prize and the silver challenge cup.

The second tournament was played on 13 and 14 April 1921. There was 36-holes of stroke play on the first day with the leading four players involved in a knock-out competition on the second day. The total prize money was £200. James Ockenden led after the first day on 139 with Frank Ball, Fred Leach and J.H. Taylor on 143. The winner was J.H. Taylor who beat James Ockenden in the final.

The third tournament extended to a third day and was played on 19–21 April 1922. As in 1921, there was 36-holes of stroke play on the first day but now the leading 16 players qualified for a knock-out competition on the second and third days. Percy Alliss led the stroke play on 144, with players scoring 151 and better qualifying. James Ockenden completed the last 9 holes of his first round in 30 strokes. Ockenden beat George Duncan in the final.

The fourth tournament was played on 11–13 April 1923. The total prize money was again £200. Abe Mitchell and Ted Ray led on 140 with those scoring 144 and less also qualifying. Willie Ritchie got the final place by winning a four-player 9-hole playoff of those scoring 145, scoring 36. The veteran Sandy Herd beat Fred Jewell in the final.

The fifth tournament was played on 9–12 April 1924. Sandy Herd and Abe Mitchell led on 139 with those scoring 144 and less also qualifying. Six players scored 145 and with only five places for them, they drew lots and Charles Johns was the unlucky player. There was a fall of snow before the knock-out stage started and although a few matches started, play was soon abandoned for the day. Conditions were little better on the following day but the two rounds were completed. Conditions were again cold and wet on the final day with the players drinking cups of hot coffee at the turn. Ted Ray beat Rowland Jones in the final.

The sixth tournament was played on 1–3 April 1925. Despite the earlier start the weather was much better than in 1924. Abe Mitchell led the qualification for the third successive year with two rounds of 67 on the short Roehampton course, four stroke ahead of the rest of the field. Three players scored 146 and played off for the final place. Mitchell lost in the semi-final to Aubrey Boomer, the eventual winner. Poor putting put him four down after seven holes. He recovered and had a putt of less than three yards at the last to tie the match, but missed and Boomer won the match.

The seventh tournament was played on 14–16 April 1926. James Ockenden and George Gadd led the qualification on 137, Gadd scoring 66 in the morning round. Six players had a 6-hole playoff for the final place, Len Holland winning with a score of 22. Abe Mitchell and George Duncan won their semi-finals comfortably with Mitchell winning the eagerly-anticipated final.

The eighth tournament was played on 6–8 April 1927, soon after the announcement of the Ryder Cup team. Ernest Whitcombe led the qualification on 137. George Duncan equalled the course record with 66 in the afternoon. Sandy Herd got the final place, winning a 6-hole playoff against Rowland Jones. Ryder Cup captain Abe Mitchell beat Ernest Whitcombe in the final. Mitchell was six up after nine holes but Whitcombe score 7 threes and a four at the next eight holes before losing 3&1. Mitchell was the first person to win the tournament twice and so won the cup outright.

The ninth tournament was played on 18–20 April 1928. Arthur Havers led the qualification on 138. Six players tied on 145 played a 6-hole playoff to determine the final qualifier, won by Tom Walton with 22. Abe Mitchell won for the third successive year, beating Fred Robson in the final.

The tenth tournament was played on 10–12 April 1929, two weeks before the Ryder Cup. Bert Hodson led the qualification on 138. Three players tied on 149 played a 6-hole playoff to determine the final two qualifiers. Charles Johns qualified with 22 but Alfred Miles and Fred Holden were still tied for the remaining place. They were still tied after three more holes and then again after a further six before finally in the half-light Holden qualified in a sudden-death playoff. In very poor conditions Archie Compston beat Charles Whitcombe in the final, winning at the 18th hole. Compston and Charles Whitcombe were paired together in the 1929 Ryder Cup and both undefeated in the contest.

The eleventh tournament was played on 9–11 April 1930. Reg Whitcombe led the qualification on 137, having scored a record 64 in the afternoon round - coming home in 29. Three players tied on 144 for the final two places. Mark Seymour beat Fred Robson in the final. Robson was 1 up with three holes to play but lost the next two holes after poor drives. The last hole was halved to give Seymour the victory.

The twelfth tournament was played on 9–11 April 1931 on a Roehampton course lengthened to over 6,000 yards. Tournament was played from Thursday to Saturday instead of the previous Wednesday to Friday. Alf Perry led the qualification on 136. Three players scored 67 in the afternoon and shared a £10 prize for the new course record. Seven players tied on 143 for six places. These player went out again, in pairs, for three further holes. George Gadd, playing last, took 4-5-6 and missed out. Herbert Jolly beat Ryder Cup captain Charles Whitcombe in the final. Whitcombe had won the short 17th to level the match. With Whitcombe 5 feet from the hole in three, Jolly holed from 7 yards for a three to take the match.

The thirteenth tournament was played on 7–9 April 1932. Alf Perry again led the qualification on 139 including a 67 in the morning. Six players tied on 150 for two places. A further three holes were played and William Oke (13) and Gus Faulkner (14) qualified. Mark Seymour beat Alf Padgham 4&2 in the final to become the second player to win the cup outright. Seymour was three up at the turn but Padgham reduced this to one after the 12th. Seymour then holed good putts at 13, 14 and 15 to go dormie. A safe four at the 16th gave him victory.

The fourteenth tournament was played on 6–8 April 1933. Allan Dailey led the qualification on 141. Dick Wheildon set a new course record of 66. Four players tied on 145 for one place. A further three holes were played which eliminated two players. In the gathering dusk Don Curtis eventually qualified at the second sudden-death hole. The feature of the first round matches was a close contest between Allan Dailey and Ted Ray. Ray was three up with four to play but Ray lost the 15th and 17th after being bunkered. Dailey then holed an 8-yard putt at the last to halve the match. The match went to extra holes with Dailey winning at the 22nd. The remainder of the tournament was a remarkable success for Dailey who won the next three matches 7&6, 7&6 and 8&6 in the final against Charles Whitcombe. Dailey had played the last 8 holes against Ray and then three complete matches without losing a single hole.

The fifteenth tournament was played on 5–7 April 1934. Sam King led the qualification on 136. Five players tied on 145 for the final three places. Reg Whitcombe beat Arthur Lacey 7&5 in the final.

The sixteenth tournament was played on 4–6 April 1935. In terrible conditions Archie Compston led the qualification on 143. All those scoring 149 and better qualified. Alf Padgham played Syd Easterbrook in one of the semi-finals. At the second hole Easterbrook's ball was on the lip of the hole in four. Padwick's third shot hit Easterbrook's ball. Easterbrook's ball was replaced but left Padwick "in the deadest of dead stymies." Padwick, however, "hit his ball so wide of Easterbrook's that the whole gallery must have thought he was contenting himself with a safe half. But not a bit of it. His ball, after passing the obstruction, took a sudden curl in the desired direction and dropped into the hole for a win". Compston won the final 3&1 against Alf Padgham, scoring 63 for the 17 holes. The match ended at the 17th when Padgham, needing to win the last two holes, knocked Compston's ball into the hole. Having previously won in 1929 Compston became the third player to win the cup outright.

== Winners ==
Year	Winner	Country	Score	Runner-up	Country	Ref
1920	George Duncan	Scotland	144	Sandy Herd (146)	Scotland	
1921	J.H. Taylor	England	5 & 4	James Ockenden	England	
1922	James Ockenden	England	2 & 1	George Duncan	Scotland	
1923	Sandy Herd	Scotland	3 & 2	Fred Jewell	England	
1924	Ted Ray	Jersey	1 up	Rowland Jones	England	
1925	Aubrey Boomer	Jersey	2 & 1	Archie Compston	England	
1926	Abe Mitchell	England	3 & 2	George Duncan	Scotland	
1927	Abe Mitchell	England	3 & 1	Ernest Whitcombe	England	
1928	Abe Mitchell	England	19th	Fred Robson	England	
1929	Archie Compston	England	1 up	Charles Whitcombe	England	
1930	Mark Seymour	England	1 up	Fred Robson	England	
1931	Herbert Jolly	Guernsey	1 up	Charles Whitcombe	England	
1932	Mark Seymour	England	4 & 2	Alf Padgham	England	
1933	Allan Dailey	Scotland	8 & 6	Charles Whitcombe	England	
1934	Reg Whitcombe	England	7 & 5	Arthur Lacey	England	
1935	Archie Compston	England	3 & 1	Alf Padgham	England	
