= 1929 Ryder Cup =

1929 edition of the Ryder Cup

Coordinates: 53.859°N 1.541°W

2nd Ryder Cup Matches
- Dates: 26–27 April 1929
- Venue: Moortown Golf Club
- Location: Leeds, England
- Captains: George Duncan (Great Britain); Walter Hagen (USA)
(United Kingdom)	7	5	(United States)
- Great Britain wins the Ryder Cup

The 2nd Ryder Cup Matches were held at the Moortown Golf Club in Leeds, England. It was very cold, with hail and at one point heavy snow on the greens. About two thousand spectators saw America gain a narrow lead after the foursome matches before the Great Britain team won singles on the final day and thus the competition by a score of 7–5 points. George Duncan of Scotland became the first of only three GB & Ireland captains to lift the Ryder Cup which was given to him by Samuel Ryder who was in attendance after missing the 1927 matches.

== Format ==
The Ryder Cup is a match play event, with each match worth one point. From 1927 through 1959, the format consisted of 4 foursome (alternate shot) matches on the first day and 8 singles matches on the second day, for a total of 12 points. Therefore, 6 1/2 points were required to win the Cup. All matches were played to a maximum of 36 holes.

== Teams ==
In late 1928, it was announced that a selection committee of five professional golfers would choose the Great Britain team for the 1929 Ryder Cup. This committee consisted of James Braid, Sandy Herd and J.H. Taylor together with James Batley and Bob McKenzie. In January 1929, the team of 10 (as below) were selected with Duncan as captain.

Team Great Britain
Name	Age	Previous Ryder Cups	Matches	W–L–H	Winning percentage
(Scotland) George Duncan – captain	45	1	2	1–1–0	50.00
(England) Percy Alliss	32	0	Rookie
(Jersey) Aubrey Boomer	31	1	2	1–1–0	50.00
(Scotland) Stewart Burns	29	0	Rookie
(England) Archie Compston	36	1	2	0–2–0	0.00
(England) Henry Cotton	22	0	Rookie
(England) Abe Mitchell	42	0	Rookie
(England) Fred Robson	44	1	2	0–2–0	0.00
(England) Charles Whitcombe	33	1	2	1–0–1	75.00
(England) Ernest Whitcombe	38	0	Rookie

The American team sailed on the Mauretania and arrived in Plymouth on 16 April and travelled to London the same day.

Team USA
Name	Age	Previous Ryder Cups	Matches	W–L–H	Winning percentage
Walter Hagen – captain	36	1	2	2–0–0	100.00
Leo Diegel	29	1	2	1–1–0	50.00
Ed Dudley	28	0	Rookie
Al Espinosa	38	1	0	0–0–0
Johnny Farrell	28	1	2	2–0–0	100.00
Johnny Golden	33	1	2	2–0–0	100.00
Gene Sarazen	27	1	2	1–0–1	75.00
Horton Smith	20	0	Rookie
Joe Turnesa	28	1	2	1–1–0	50.00
Al Watrous	29	1	2	2–0–0	100.00

Diegel celebrated his 30th birthday on the second day of the match.

It was originally planned that, as in 1927, only eight players should be used by each team. However, Hagen wished to use all 10 of his players. This was agreed to, although Duncan announced that he would only select eight as originally intended. Alliss and Burns were left out.

The Americans stayed in Europe to play in a number of tournaments and exhibition matches. The 1929 Open Championship played from 8 to 10 May was dominated by Americans. Hagen won with Farrell second and Diegel third. Two more of the American Ryder Cup team were in the top 10 which also included three more golfers then resident in the United States but born in the UK. The whole team played in the Yorkshire Evening News One Thousand Guineas Tournament at Moortown from 14 to 18 May which was won by Joe Turnesa. Horton Smith then won the French PGA Championship at St. Cloud on his 21st birthday. Smith had a 12 shot lead after the first day and although a third round 61 by Aubrey Boomer reduced his lead to five, Smith won the tournament by five strokes. Smith, Farrell and Hagen finished second, third and fourth in the German Open, a tournament won by Percy Alliss. It was not until 2 June that Hagen, Farrell, Turnesa, Dudley and Smith sailed from Southampton to return to New York.

== Friday's foursome matches ==
An unusual feature of the Moortown course was that all the five short holes were even numbered holes. This meant that the same player had the tee shot at those holes. In the Diegel/Espinosa pairing Diegel had the tee shots at the short holes and with some excellent irons shots and good putting from Espinosa they had three twos at these holes. At lunch they were round in 66, despite a 6 at the second hole, and were 7 holes up. The remaining match were all close with the American having small leads in two matches and the other match level.

The Charles Whitcombe/Compston v Farrell/Turnesa match was always close and when the British pair levelled the match at the 15th hole of the second round, it was the fifth time they had got back to all square. The British pair then won the 16th with the 17th hole halved. At the last Whitcombe drove into a gorse bush which meant that Compston had to take a penalty shot. The American pair were also in trouble and their second shot finished near a fence with a refreshment tent between the ball and the green. Farrell having just enough room for his back-swing, played over the tent and finished 7 feet from the hole. the British pair could do no better than 6 and so the Americans won the hole to halve the match. In the final match, Golden and Hagen were 4 up early in the second round but Ernest Whitcombe and Cotton levelled the match. The Americans then won the last two holes to take the match.

	Results
C. Whitcombe/Compston	halved	Farrell/Turnesa
Boomer/Duncan	(United States) 7 & 5	Diegel/Espinosa
Mitchell/Robson	(United Kingdom) 2 & 1	Sarazen/Dudley
E. Whitcombe/Cotton	(United States) 2 up	Golden/Hagen
1 1/2	Session	2 1/2
1 1/2	Overall	2 1/2

18 hole scores: Farrell/Turnesa: 1 up, Diegel/Espinosa: 7 up, Mitchell/Robson v Sarazen/Dudley: all square, Golden/Hagen: 2 up.

== Saturday's singles matches ==
At lunch three of the eight matches were almost decided with Charles Whitcombe and Duncan having commanding leads for the British team and Diegel in a similar situation for the Americans. Boomer won the last four holes in the morning to go from 2 down to 2 up. Cotton was one down playing the last hole of the morning. His second shot ended up on a path between the gorse bushes but he chipped in for a three to halve the match. Compston won the first three holes in the afternoon to go 4 up but then lost three to go back to 1 up before winning comfortably 6 & 4. With Boomer winning his match, the British team needed either Cotton or Ernest Whitcombe to get a point for Britain to win the Ryder Cup. Cotton won his match at the 15th to give Great Britain the victory and with Ernest Whitcombe going dormie at the 16th a sixth point of the day seemed likely. However Espinosa won the last two holes to halve the match.

	Results
Charles Whitcombe	(United Kingdom) 8 & 6	Johnny Farrell
George Duncan	(United Kingdom) 10 & 8	Walter Hagen
Abe Mitchell	(United States) 9 & 8	Leo Diegel
Archie Compston	(United Kingdom) 6 & 4	Gene Sarazen
Aubrey Boomer	(United Kingdom) 4 & 3	Joe Turnesa
Fred Robson	(United States) 4 & 2	Horton Smith
Henry Cotton	(United Kingdom) 4 & 3	Al Watrous
Ernest Whitcombe	halved	Al Espinosa
5 1/2	Session	2 1/2
7	Overall	5

18 hole scores: Charles Whitcombe: 6 up, Duncan: 5 up, Diegel: 5 up, Compston: 1 up, Boomer: 2 up, Robson v Smith: all square, Cotton v Watrous: all square, Ernest Whitcombe v Espinosa: all square.

== Individual player records ==
Each entry refers to the win–loss–half record of the player.

=== Great Britain ===
Player	Points	Overall	Singles	Foursomes
Aubrey Boomer	1	1–1–0	1–0–0	0–1–0
Archie Compston	1.5	1–0–1	1–0–0	0–0–1
Henry Cotton	1	1–1–0	1–0–0	0–1–0
George Duncan	1	1–1–0	1–0–0	0–1–0
Abe Mitchell	1	1–1–0	0–1–0	1–0–0
Fred Robson	1	1–1–0	0–1–0	1–0–0
Charles Whitcombe	1.5	1–0–1	1–0–0	0–0–1
Ernest Whitcombe	0.5	0–1–1	0–0–1	0–1–0

Percy Alliss and Stewart Burns did not play in any matches.

=== United States ===
Player	Points	Overall	Singles	Foursomes
Leo Diegel	2	2–0–0	1–0–0	1–0–0
Ed Dudley	0	0–1–0	0–0–0	0–1–0
Al Espinosa	1.5	1–0–1	0–0–1	1–0–0
Johnny Farrell	0.5	0–1–1	0–1–0	0–0–1
Johnny Golden	1	1–0–0	0–0–0	1–0–0
Walter Hagen	1	1–1–0	0–1–0	1–0–0
Gene Sarazen	0	0–2–0	0–1–0	0–1–0
Horton Smith	1	1–0–0	1–0–0	0–0–0
Joe Turnesa	0.5	0–1–1	0–1–0	0–0–1
Al Watrous	0	0–1–0	0–1–0	0–0–0
