= Archie Compston =

English professional golfer

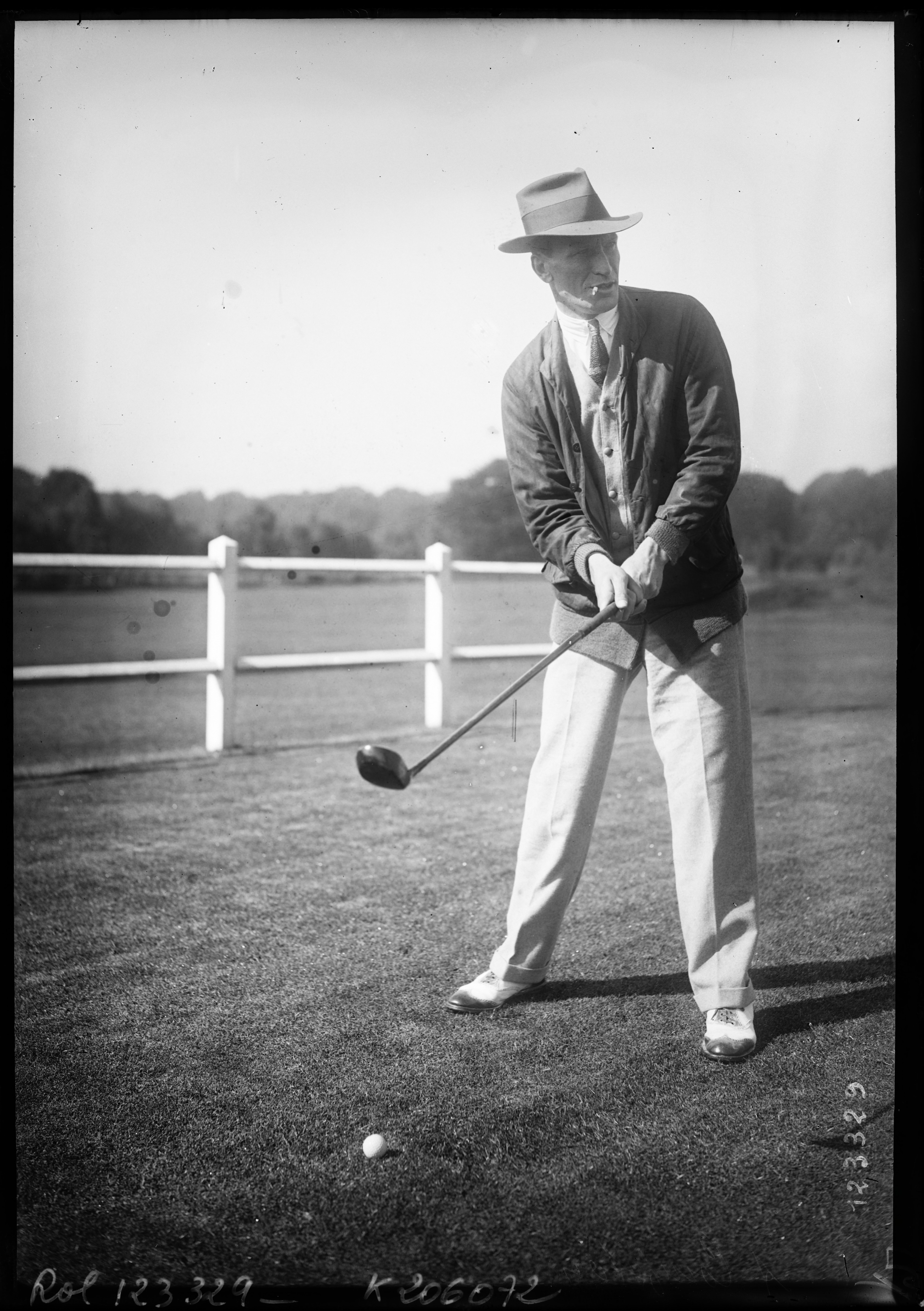

Personal information
- Full name: Archibald Edward Wones Compston
- Nationality: England
- Born: 1893 Wolverhampton, England
- Died: 8 August 1962 (age 69) London, England

Career
- Sport: Golf
- Status: Professional
- Professional wins: 10

Best results in major championships
- Masters Tournament: DNP
- PGA Championship: DNP
- U.S. Open: T7: 1927
- The Open Championship: T2: 1925

Archibald Edward Wones Compston (1893 – 8 August 1962) was an English professional golfer. Through the 1920s he built a reputation as a formidable match play golfer, in an era when many professionals made more money from "challenge" matches against fellow pros, or wealthy amateurs, than from tournament golf.

== Early life ==
Compston was born in Wolverhampton.

== Professional career ==
Compston won the British PGA Matchplay Championship in 1925 and 1927. In 1928, he faced Walter Hagen, who had won the PGA Championship at match play in the previous four years, in a 72-hole challenge match, and defeated the American 18 & 17. However, when the two met again shortly afterward at The Open Championship at Royal St George's, Hagen prevailed, with Compston placing third.

In 1930, Compston nearly derailed Bobby Jones's bid for the Grand Slam at Hoylake - his third round of 68 took the lead from Jones, but inexplicably his form deserted him in the final round, and Compston shot 82 to finish down the field.

Compston played in the Ryder Cup in 1927, 1929 and 1931, defeating Gene Sarazen on one occasion.

Compston also became notable as perhaps Britain's first "celebrity" professional golfer, becoming a coach to the future Edward VIII. In late 1936, just before the abdication crisis, he took 3,000 golf balls on the steam yacht Nahlin with the uncrowned King (and Mrs. Wallis Simpson) on a cruise in the Adriatic, for the King to drive into the sea.

He was the professional at the Wentworth Club from 1945 to 1948, and later at the Mid Ocean Club in Bermuda.

== Tournament wins (11) ==
This list may be incomplete

- 1925 Leeds Cup, Glasgow Herald Tournament, British PGA Matchplay Championship
- 1926 Leeds Cup
- 1927 Ifield Tournament, British PGA Matchplay Championship
- 1928 Eastern Open Championship
- 1929 Roehampton Invitation
- 1930 Daily Dispatch Southport Tournament
- 1935 Roehampton Invitation
- 1945 Yorkshire Evening News Tournament

== Results in major championships ==
Tournament	1914	1915	1916	1917	1918	1919
The Open Championship	T73	NT	NT	NT	NT	NT
U.S. Open				NT	NT	

Tournament	1920	1921	1922	1923	1924	1925	1926	1927	1928	1929
The Open Championship	T9	35	27	T59	T21	T2	DQ	T23	3	12
U.S. Open								T7	T22	

Tournament	1930	1931	1932	1933	1934	1935	1936	1937	1938	1939
The Open Championship	T6	T29	T10	T12		T49	T44			CUT
U.S. Open										

Tournament	1940	1941	1942	1943	1944	1945	1946	1947
The Open Championship	NT	NT	NT	NT	NT	NT	T18	CUT
U.S. Open			NT	NT	NT	NT		

Note: Compston only played in The Open Championship and the U.S. Open.

Top 10
Did not play

NT = No tournament
DQ = disqualified
CUT = missed the half-way cut
"T" indicates a tie for a place

== Team appearances ==
- Great Britain vs USA (representing Great Britain): 1926 (winners)
- Ryder Cup (representing Great Britain): 1927, 1929 (winners), 1931
- France–Great Britain Professional Match (representing Great Britain): 1929 (winners, captain)
- England–Scotland Professional Match (representing England): 1932 (winners), 1935 (winners)
- England–Ireland Professional Match (representing England): 1932 (winners)
