= Tom Fernie =

Scottish golfer

Personal information
- Full name: Thomas Robert Fernie
- Born: 1 February 1890 Troon, Ayrshire, Scotland
- Died: 13 December 1952 (aged 62) Blackpool, Lancashire, England

Career
- Sport: Golf
- Status: Professional
- Professional wins: 4

Best results in major championships
- Masters Tournament: DNP
- PGA Championship: DNP
- U.S. Open: DNP
- The Open Championship: 5th: 1923

Thomas Robert Fernie (1 February 1890 – 13 December 1952) was a Scottish professional golfer. He won the Scottish Professional Championship four times and finished in 5th place in the 1923 Open Championship. He was the son of Willie Fernie who won the 1883 Open Championship.

== Golf career ==
Fernie won the Scottish Professional Championship four times, in 1909, 1910, 1919 and 1920 and was runner-up in 1922 and 1925. He was also runner-up in the 1910 Dunlop Cup. In 1911 Fernie became professional at Turnberry. He finished in 5th place in the 1923 Open Championship. The following year he withdrew from the Open qualifying because of the death of his father. He was tied for 4th after the first day of the 1925 Open Championship but had a poor final day and finished tied for 14h place. In 1926 he left Turnberry and became the professional at Royal Lytham & St Annes Golf Club. In the 1933 Open Championship on the Old Course at St Andrews he started with a 70 and was tied for second place. He scored 78 in the second round and failed to return his card on the final day.

== Death ==
Fernie died in the Blackpool Victoria Hospital, Lancashire on 13 December 1952 aged 62. His estate was valued at over £13,000. After retiring from Royal Lytham & St Annes Golf Club, Fernie had become a sports outfitter in Lytham St Annes.

== Tournament wins ==
- 1909 Scottish Professional Championship
- 1910 Scottish Professional Championship
- 1919 Scottish Professional Championship
- 1920 Scottish Professional Championship

== Results in major championships ==
Tournament	1909	1910	1911	1912	1913	1914	1915	1916	1917	1918	1919
The Open Championship	WD	?	T29	47	52	T56	NT	NT	NT	NT	NT

Tournament	1920	1921	1922	1923	1924	1925	1926	1927	1928	1929	1930	1931	1932	1933
The Open Championship			T53	5		T14		T46		T43		CUT		WD

Note: Fernie only played in The Open Championship.

Top 10
Did not play

NT = No tournament
WD = withdrew
? = finish unknown
CUT = missed the half-way cut
"T" indicates a tie for a place

== Team appearances ==
- England–Scotland Professional Match (representing Scotland): 1910, 1912 (tie), 1913, 1933
