= Moray Golf Club =

Golf club in Moray, Scotland

Coordinates: 57.719°N 3.316°W

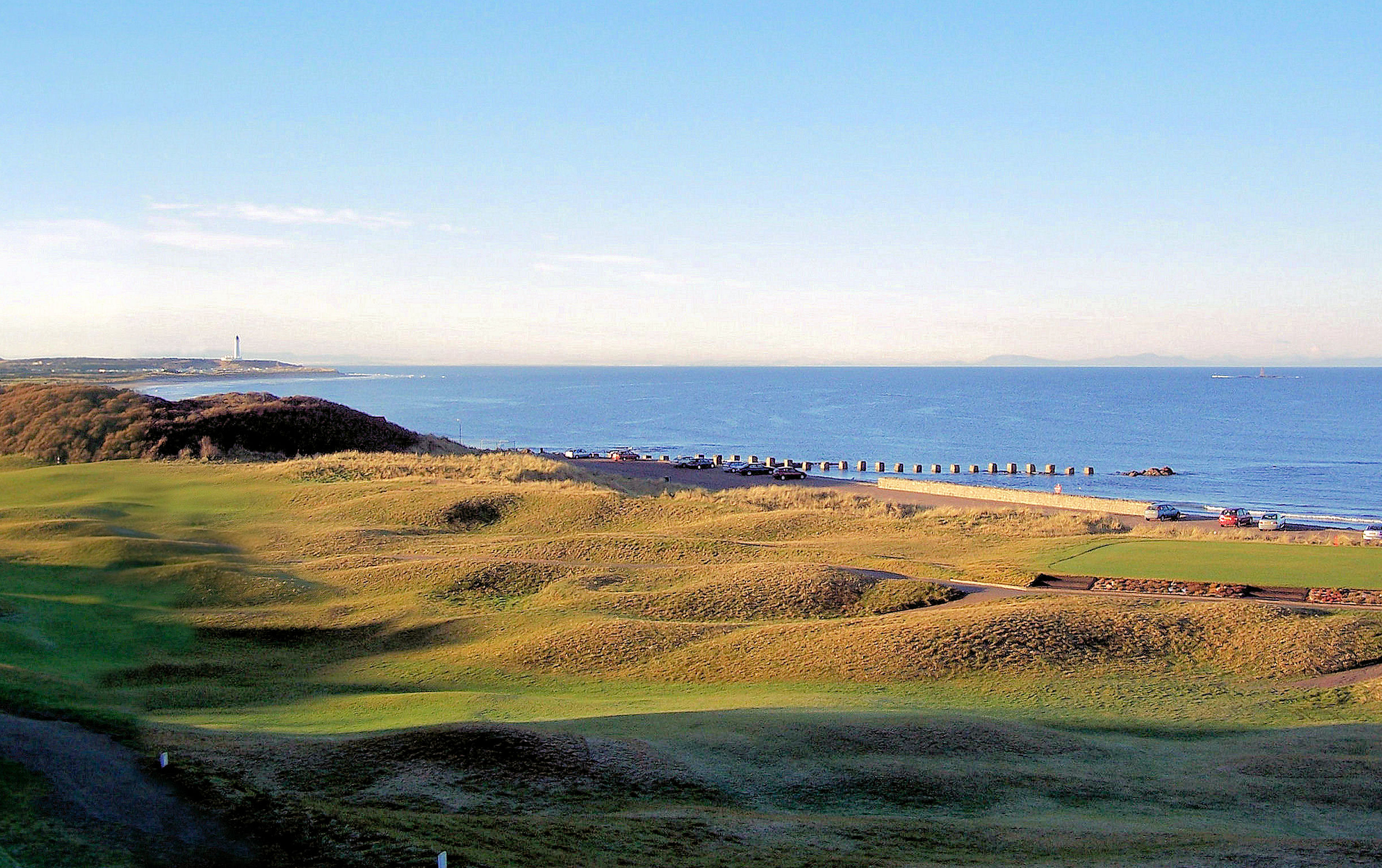
- Interactive map of Moray Golf Club

Club information
- Location: Stotfield Road; Lossiemouth; Moray
- Established: 1889
- Type: Private
- Owner: The Moray Golf Club
- Tota holes: 36
- Tournaments: Moray Open Championship (annually); Northern Open (occasionally)

Moray Golf Club is situated in Lossiemouth (on the south coast of the Moray Firth), Moray, Scotland. The club has two eighteen-hole courses appropriately called the Old Course and the New Course. The club has played host to many championships, both amateur and professional. The old and new courses were designed by Old Tom Morris and Henry Cotton respectively.

== Club history ==
The first attempt to set up a golf club in Lossiemouth was in 1875, when a seven-hole course was established in the Stotfield area. This club failed after a few years, and it wasn't until 30 March 1889 that the present club was officially opened. At that time, the club had 82 members who were mostly from Elgin, the county capital, some 6 miles to the south. Captain James Brander of Pitgaveny, also a founding member, leased the land to the club and Old Tom Morris the St Andrews professional designed the layout. Initially, there were only 16 holes but within a year the course was extended to 18 by leasing land from Sir William Gordon Cumming. By 1897, the membership had grown to around 320, 85 of which were ladies. The membership stood at 635 in 1904, 135 being ladies. In 1905 the ladies got their own 9-hole Ladies Relief course. The new 18-hole course, designed by Sir Henry Cotton, opened in 1979 and incorporated the 9-hole course. Membership has now grown to more than 1700.

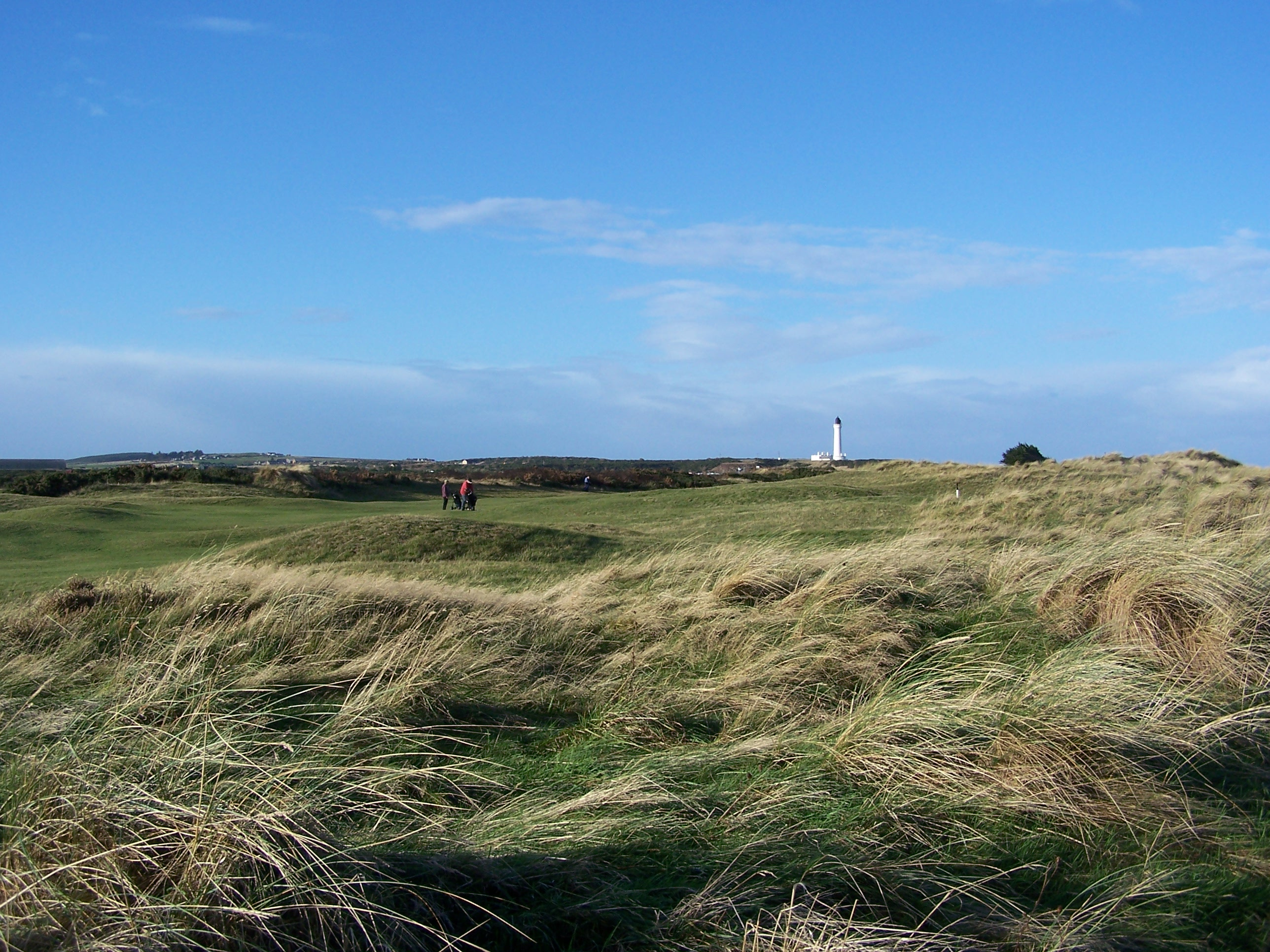

The club found itself in a political dispute during the First World War over the membership of Ramsay MacDonald, who was from Lossiemouth and then an outspoken anti-war Labour MP. MacDonald was a keen golfer and his sons also played at the club, but in August 1915 a group of members submitted a motion to remove his name from the roll of members on the grounds that the club's character was damaged. The council of the club refused to take any action, with MacDonald himself objecting that they were not elected to take political judgments. However, a year later, a new motion was submitted by some 30 members who had not signed the previous motion; they asserted that the failure to take action had caused other members to resign. A special meeting was held in the Burgh court house in Elgin on 1 September 1916 at which a London barrister moved that MacDonald had forfeited his right to membership; the motion was carried by 73 to 24. MacDonald regretted that their actions had held the club up to ridicule and contempt and never played there again. An attempt to rescind the motion in July 1924 (when MacDonald was Prime Minister) failed to secure the necessary two-thirds majority. A further attempt in July 1929 was successful but Macdonald, having felt the initial expulsion deeply, refused this offer.

== Course details ==
Old Course (White Tees)
Hole	Name	Par	SSI	Yards	Hole	Name	Par	SSI	Yards
1	Mt Lebanon	4	11	325	10	Tom Morris	4	14	312
2	Cup	5	3	484	11	Lighthouse	4	2	423
3	Table	4	8	397	12	Beacon	4	10	389
4	Coulart	3	13	197	13	St Gerardines	4	4	416
5	Kinneddar	4	6	416	14	Sea	4	7	427
6	Gordonstoun	3	17	146	15	Short	3	18	184
7	Ring	4	9	434	16	Road	4	12	351
8	Heather	4	1	452	17	Long	5	5	509
9	Ditch	4	15	310	18	Home	4	16	406
Out		35		3161		In		36	3417
							Out	35	3161
							Total	71	6578

New Course (White Tees)
Hole	Name	Par	SSI	Yards	Hole	Name	Par	SSI	Yards
1	Hillocks	4	10	367	10	Bents	4	9	325
2	Pitgaveny	4	14	325	11	Ben Rinnes	3	17	151
3	King O’ the Castle	4	2	419	12	Altyre	4	4	433
4	Junction	3	16	132	13	Auld Dyke	4	11	340
5	Jimmy Neil	4	5	371	14	Dinna top	5	1	512
6	J.R.Robertson	3	18	100	15	Boyd Anderson	4	6	405
7	Covesea	4	7	422	16	The Rock	4	13	328
8	Skerries	4	3	412	17	Caesar’s Grave	3	15	181
9	Ca’ canny	4	12	364	18	The Mound	4	8	421
Out		34		2912		In		35	3096
							Out	34	2912
							Total	69	6008
