= Mark Seymour (golfer) =

English golfer (1897–1952)

Personal information
- Full name: Mark William Seymour
- Nationality: England
- Born: 1897 East Grinstead, Sussex, England
- Died: 16 September 1952 (aged 54–55) Skegness, England

Career
- Sport: Golf
- Turned professional: 1921
- Professional wins: 9

Best results in major championships
- Masters Tournament: DNP
- PGA Championship: DNP
- U.S. Open: DNP
- The Open Championship: T18: 1929, 1935

Mark William Seymour (1897 – 16 September 1952) was an English professional golfer. His birth was registered as William Mark Seymour. He was a half-brother of Abe Mitchell. Although not as successful as his half-brother, he enjoyed considerable success during his time in Scotland and twice played for England against Scotland. In important tournaments he was a runner-up in the 1931 Irish Open and a losing finalist in the 1931 and 1933 News of the World Match Play.

== Early life ==
Seymour was born in East Grinstead, Sussex in 1897. He was the son of Mark and Mary Seymour. Mary had an illegitimate son, Abe Mitchell, Mark's half-brother, who was also a successful professional golfer. He played left-handed until he was 11 but changed to play right-handed because the clubs were easier to find. He won the 1921 Golf Illustrated Gold Vase and turned professional later the same year.

== Golf career ==
After World War I, Seymour had played his golf as a North Foreland Golf Club amateur and took his first professional position at Rochester and Cobham Golf Club in early 1922. In 1924 he moved to St Leonards-on-Sea where he stayed until resigning in 1931. He was unattached for a short period and moved to Scotland, joining Crow Wood Golf Club, Glasgow in 1932. He moved to Bonnyton Moor Golf Club in early 1936 before leaving in 1937 to be work in a shop, teaching and selling golfing equipment. In 1942 Seymour became the professional at North Shore Golf Club in Skegness.

== Death and legacy ==
Seymour died in his shop at the North Shore Golf Club in Skegness, England on 16 September 1952 at the age 55. His son Mark Donald Seymour was also a professional golfer.

== Amateur wins ==
- 1921 Golf Illustrated Gold Vase

== Professional wins ==
- 1930 Roehampton Invitation Tournament
- 1931 Scottish Professional Championship
- 1932 Roehampton Invitation Tournament
- 1933 Scottish Professional Championship
- 1934 Scottish Professional Championship, Dunlop-Scottish Tournament
- 1935 Dunlop-Scottish Tournament, Czechoslovak Open
- 1936 Czechoslovak Open

== Results in major championships ==
| Tournament | 1920 | 1921 | 1922 | 1923 | 1924 | 1925 | 1926 | 1927 | 1928 | 1929 |
|---|---|---|---|---|---|---|---|---|---|---|
| The Amateur Championship | R128 | R256 | – | – | – | – | – | – | – | – |
| The Open Championship | | T41 | T61 | T44 | T28 | | CUT | T52 | | T18 |

| Tournament | 1930 | 1931 | 1932 | 1933 | 1934 | 1935 | 1936 | 1937 |
|---|---|---|---|---|---|---|---|---|
| The Open Championship | | T23 | T22 | | T35 | T18 | | CUT |

Note: Seymour only played in The Open Championship and The Amateur Championship.

Did not play

CUT = missed the half-way cut
R256, R128 = Round in which player lost in match play
"T" indicates a tie for a place

== Team appearances ==
- England–Scotland Professional Match (representing England): 1932 (winners), 1933 (winners)
- England–Ireland Professional Match (representing England): 1932 (winners), 1933 (winners)
- Ireland–Scotland Professional Match (representing Scotland): 1932
