= 1925 Open Championship =

Coordinates: 55.502°N 4.619°W

Tournament information
- Dates: 25–26 June 1925
- Location: Prestwick, South Ayrshire, Scotland
- Course: Prestwick Golf Club

Statistics
- Field: 83 players
- Cut: none
- Prize fund: £200
- Winner's share: £75

Champion
- (England) (United States) Jim Barnes
- 300

Location in Scotland

The 1925 Open Championship was the 60th Open Championship, held 25–26 June at Prestwick Golf Club in Prestwick, South Ayrshire, Scotland. In the final Open at Prestwick, Jim Barnes captured his only Open title, one stroke ahead of runners-up Ted Ray and Archie Compston. It was Barnes' fourth and final major title; he won the first two PGA Championships in 1916 and 1919, and the U.S. Open in 1921.

Qualifying took place on 22–23 June 1925. Qualification took place at Troon with 18 holes on the Old Course and 18 holes the Portland Course. The top 80 and ties qualified. The qualifying score was 158 and 83 players qualified. Irishman Moses O'Neill led the qualifiers on 146.

Born and raised in Cornwall, England, Barnes opened with a course record 70 to take a four stroke lead as the course was dry and fast. In the second round, Macdonald Smith carded a new course record 69 for the lead at 145, two shots ahead of Barnes, who only managed a 77. Smith followed with a 76 in the third round on Friday morning and took a five-shot lead over Barnes and Compston into the final round. Barnes finished his round early and posted a 74 for a 300 total. Beginning his round after Barnes had already finished his, Smith knew that a round of 78 would win him the championship. But after starting with a 4–3 on the first two holes, he dropped three shots on the next three holes. Smith took a 6 at the 7th and 8th and went out in 42. He found a bunker on the 11th and took a 5, and shot another 6 on the 15th. Smith finished the round with an 82 and a 303 total, good enough only for fourth place. Ted Ray, the 1912 champion, finished tied for second with Compston at 301.

Smith's problems in the final round were possibly due to the huge gallery that followed him. Anticipating that he would easily win, 10,000 spectators crowded around Smith, more than the course layout or tournament stewards could handle. Ray's runner-up finish was his final top-ten in a major, as was John Henry Taylor's sixth place showing. Smith never won a major, but was runner-up on three occasions.

This was the last of the 24 Opens played at Prestwick, which hosted the first twelve. It was replaced by adjacent Troon Golf Club ("Royal Troon" since 1978) as the Open venue for southwestern Scotland. Turnberry was added to the rota in 1977, southwest of Prestwick.

It was the last Open scheduled for just two days, at 36 holes each. In 1926, the first two rounds were on Wednesday and Thursday, and following a 36-hole cut, the final two rounds were played on Friday. This format was continued through 1965.

== First day leaderboard ==
Thursday, 25 June 1925

Place	Player	Score
1	(United States) Macdonald Smith	76-69=145
2	(United States) Jim Barnes	70-77=147
3	(England) Archie Compston	76-75=151
T4	(England) Bill Davies	76-76=152
T4	(Scotland) Tom Fernie	78-74=152
T4	(England) Syd Wingate	74-78=152
T7	(Scotland) Duncan McCulloch	76-77=153
T7	(England) Abe Mitchell	77-76=153
T7	(Jersey) Ted Ray	77-76=153
T7	(England) John Henry Taylor	74-79=153
T7	(England) Jack Smith	75-78=153

== Final leaderboard ==
Friday, 26 June 1925

Place	Player	Score	Money
1	(United States) Jim Barnes	70-77-79-74=300	£75
T2	(England) Archie Compston	76-75-75-75=301	£32 10s
T2	(Jersey) Ted Ray	77-76-75-73=301	£32 10s
4	(United States) Macdonald Smith	76-69-76-82=303	£15
5	(England) Abe Mitchell	77-76-75-77=305	£10
T6	(England) Percy Alliss	77-80-77-76=310	£7
T6	(England) Bill Davies	76-76-80-78=310	£7
T6	(Jersey) Jack Gaudin	78-81-77-74=310	£7
T6	(England) John Henry Taylor	74-79-80-77=310	£7
T6	(England) Syd Wingate	74-78-80-78=310	£7

Amateurs: Harris (311), Cruickshank (315), Tolley (320), Hayward (337)
