= Forres golf course =

Golf course in Forres, Moray, Scotland

Coordinates: 57.608°N 3.590°W

Forres golf course is a more than century-old golf course located in Forres in the northern part of Scotland on the Moray coast. In 1889 James Braid designed and created the original nine holes, and in 1912 the course was expanded to eighteen holes by Willie Park. The 6,236-yard, par-70 course has hosted the Scottish Professional Championship tournament. The course professional is Sandy Aird, a PGA member since 1971 who has worked for the Scottish Golf Union since 1996 as North District golf coach. He is assisted by his son, Sandy Aird, Jnr.

== Course layout ==
Hole	Name	Yards - red tee	Par	Yards - yellow tee	Yards - white tee	Par
1st	Park	284	4	288	306	4
2nd	Sir Robert	291	4	327	337	4
3rd	Knock	303	4	311	323	4
4th	Valley	358	4	369	379	4
5th	Wee Birkie	131	3	138	142	3
6th	Muiry	460	5	489	505	5
7th	Witch tree	170	3	174	202	3
8th	Rodger's	327	4	336	368	4
9th	Majuba	423	5	477	482	5
10th	Califer	212	3	224	248	3
11th	Newbold	385	4	431	455	4
12th	Hugh B Stuart	367	4	385	430	4
13th	Firlands	347	4	388	398	4
14th	Pump	350	4	387	427	4
15th	Edgehill	303	4	371	383	4
16th	Pond	269	4	302	322	4
17th	Neardun	145	3	151	159	3
18th	Tower	278	4	358	370	4
Total		5403	70	5906	6236	70

== Feature hole ==
The sixteenth hole, aptly named the pond, is the feature hole of the course and requires a well-hit tee shot to avoid water and bushes. Leading up to the green is a valley just past a patch of large trees. The elevated green is protected by three bunkers and trees at the back.
