= Machrihanish Golf Club =

Golf club in Argyll and Bute, Scotland

Coordinates: 55.436°N 5.716°W

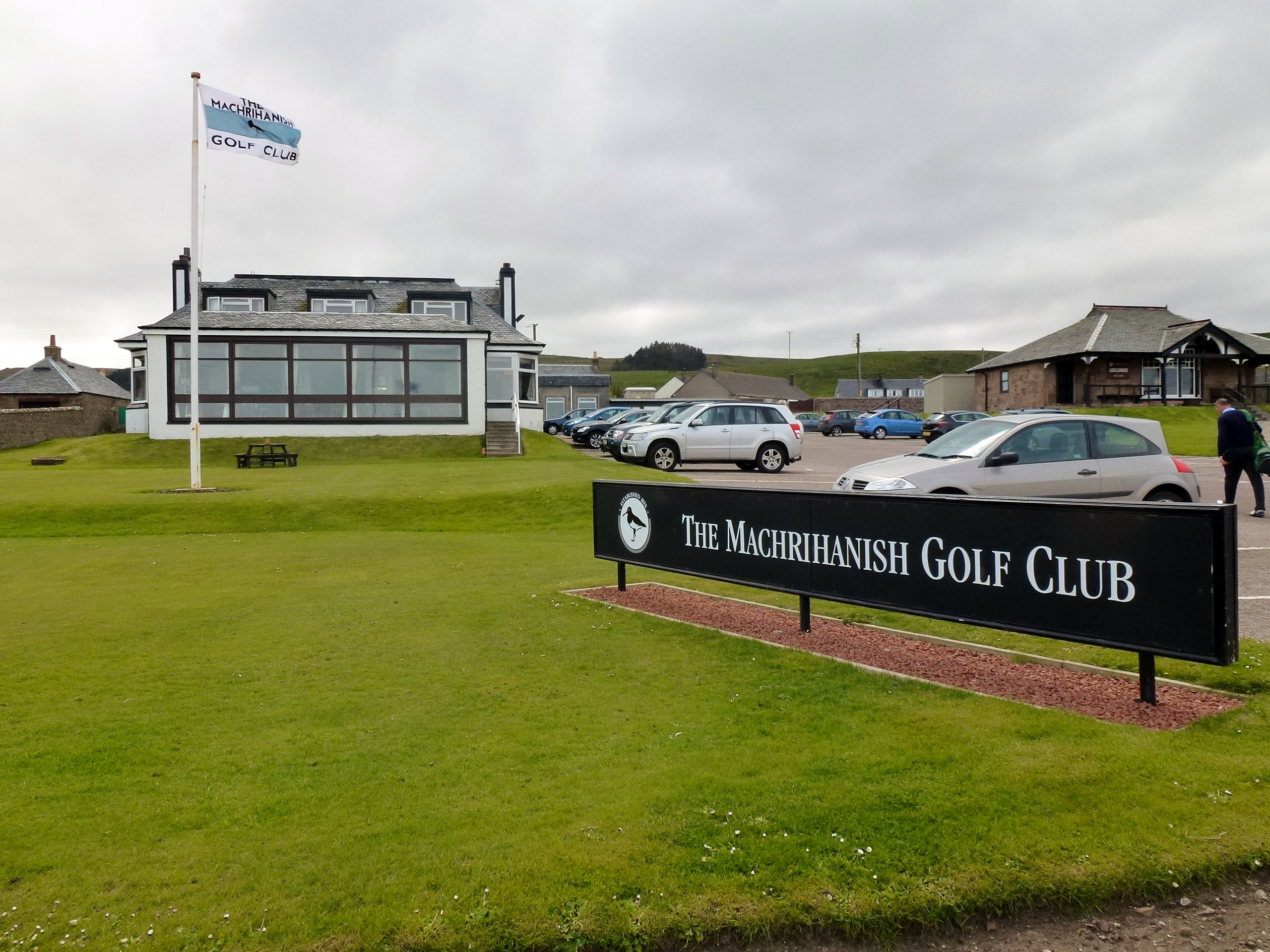
The Machrihanish clubhouse

The Machrihanish Golf Club is a classic Scottish links course situated in Machrihanish north of the Mull of Kintyre. The main course, with views of the western seaboard including the Paps of Jura and Ireland, was ranked the No. 39 course outside of the United States by Golf Digest in 2005. In particular, the first hole is often rated as one of the best opening holes in the world. Jack Nicklaus has cited the 1st at Machrihanish as the top opening hole in the world.

The golf club was founded in 1876 as the Kintyre Golf Club. The course had ten holes before the club officially existed, and was quickly expanded to 12. In 1879, Old Tom Morris was brought in to redesign and expand the course to the full 18 holes, including today's first hole. J.H. Taylor made some modifications in 1914, and in the 1940s Sir Guy Campbell brought the course to its current configuration.

The club is ranked #57 in Golf Digest's World's 100 Greatest Golf Courses 2015 list.

The club also has a shorter 9-hole golf course, and separate men's and women's clubhouses. It has hosted the Scottish Ladies Championship on several occasions. The clubhouse, which provided a bar and restaurant, both of which were open to the public, was completely destroyed in a fire in December 2018.
