= Abe Mitchell =

English professional golfer (1887–1947)

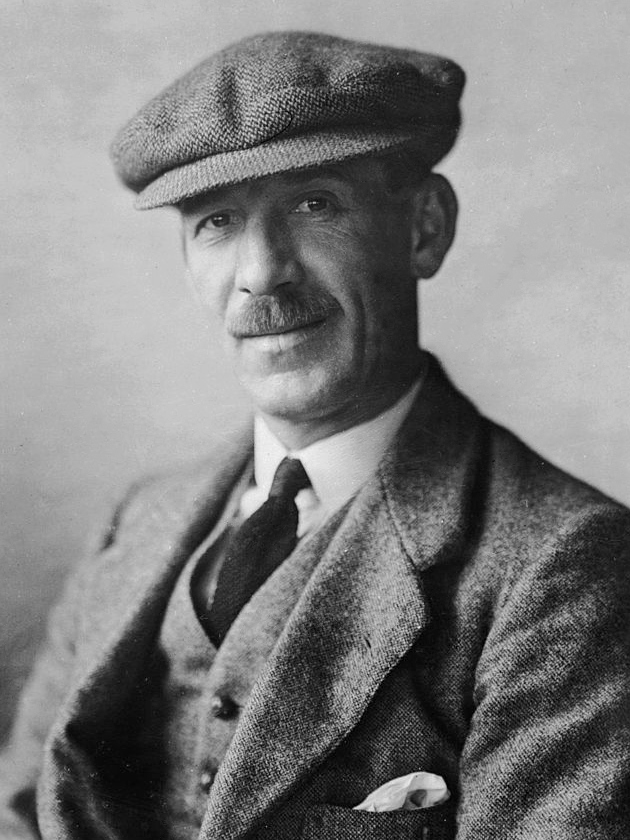
- Mitchell c. 1920

Personal information
- Full name: Henry Abraham Mitchell
- Nationality: England
- Born: 18 January 1887 East Grinstead, Sussex, England
- Died: 11 June 1947 (aged 60) St Albans, England

Career
- Sport: Golf
- Turned professional: 1913
- Professional wins: 29

Number of wins by tour
- PGA Tour: 2
- Other: 27

Best results in major championships
- Masters Tournament: DNP
- PGA Championship: DNP
- U.S. Open: T17: 1922
- The Open Championship: 4th/T4: 1914, 1920, 1929
- U.S. Amateur: DNP
- British Amateur: 2nd: 1912

Henry Abraham Mitchell (18 January 1887 – 11 June 1947) was an English professional golfer. Mitchell had eight top-10 finishes out of 17 appearances in the Open Championship, his best performance being fourth in 1920. He was runner-up in the 1912 Amateur Championship and won the 1924 Miami Open.

== Early life ==
Mitchell was born in East Grinstead, Sussex on 18 January 1887. He was the illegitimate son of Mary Mitchell. Mary married a Mark Seymour in 1890 and Abe was brought up by his grandparents, George and Sophia Mitchell. Mark and Mary had a son Mark, Abe's half-brother, who also became a successful professional golfer.

== Amateur career ==
Mitchell was a fine amateur, and played for England against the Scots in 1910 and won. He won the Golf Illustrated Gold Vase twice in 1910 and 1913, and played in two Open Championships as an amateur. He was also runner-up in the 1912 Amateur Championship, losing to John Ball on the second extra hole.

== Professional career ==
In 1913, he turned professional and was attached to Sonning Golf Club in Berkshire. Mitchell won many golf tournaments in Great Britain and toured the United States frequently, winning the 1924 Miami Open, and entered three U.S. Opens.

Mitchell led at the halfway stage in the 1920 Open Championship before collapsing in the third round, when he shot 84 and finished four shots behind winner George Duncan, who had been 13 shots off the lead after two rounds.

In a match held on 26 July 1921, Mitchell and George Duncan were paired in a foursomes match and won against Chick Evans and Charles Mayo at Edgewater Golf Club in Chicago, Illinois where Mayo was serving as the head professional.

Mitchell was supposed to be the player-captain of Great Britain's first Ryder Cup team in 1927, but was unable to make the voyage to the United States due to appendicitis. He did play on the next three teams in 1929, 1931, and 1933. Mitchell possibly was Samuel Ryder's personal golf instructor from 1925 at Verulam Golf Club, St Albans. The figure on top of the Cup trophy is modeled after Mitchell.

Mitchell had the lowest round at the 1933 Open Championship at St Andrews, carding a fine 68, and won the Tooting Bec Cup.

== Personal life and death ==
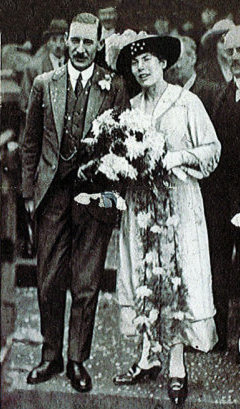
Wedding of Mitchell and Deag

Mitchell married Dora Deag on 27 November 1920 in Tunbridge Wells. He died suddenly in St Albans, England at age 60.

== Amateur wins ==
- 1910 Golf Illustrated Gold Vase
- 1913 Golf Illustrated Gold Vase

== Professional wins (29) ==
=== PGA Tour wins (2) ===
- 1922 Southern Open (tie with Leo Diegel)
- 1924 Miami Open

=== Other wins (27) ===
- 1919 St Andrews Tournament ("Victory Open") (tie with George Duncan), News of the World Match Play
- 1920 McVitie & Price Tournament (tie with James Braid), News of the World Match Play, Kent Professional Championship
- 1921 McVitie & Price Tournament, Glasgow Herald Tournament
- 1922 Glasgow Herald Tournament
- 1925 Daily Dispatch Northern Professional Championship, Evening Standard Tournament
- 1926 Evening Standard Target Tournament, Roehampton Invitation
- 1927 Roehampton Invitation, Daily Mail Tournament, Hertfordshire Open Championship
- 1928 Roehampton Invitation, Ryder Tournament (joint winner with Bill Davies)
- 1929 Leeds Cup, News of the World Match Play, Irish Open, Selsdon Park Tournament, Hertfordshire Open Championship
- 1932 Bristol Evening World Tournament, Hertfordshire Open Championship
- 1934 Dunlop-Southern Tournament, Addington Foursomes (with Rex Hartley), Hertfordshire Open Championship

== Results in major championships ==
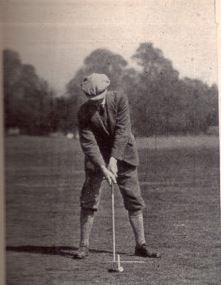
Mitchell, c. 1911, demonstrating proper fairway wood technique – notice the white perpendicular lines drawn to show correct ball placement in the stance.

Tournament	1910	1911	1912	1913	1914	1915	1916	1917	1918	1919
U.S. Open								NT	NT	
The Open Championship		CUT		WD	T4	NT	NT	NT	NT	NT
The Amateur Championship	SF	QF	2	R128	–	–	–	–	–	–

Tournament	1920	1921	1922	1923	1924	1925	1926	1927	1928	1929
U.S. Open		WD	T17							
The Open Championship	4	T13	19	T8	WD	5	T5		T21	T4

Tournament	1930	1931	1932	1933	1934	1935	1936	1937	1938	1939
U.S. Open		WD								
The Open Championship	T13	T12	T10	T7	WD	CUT				CUT

Note: Mitchell only played in The Open Championship, U.S. Open, and The Amateur Championship.

Top 10
Did not play

NT = No tournament
WD = withdrew
CUT = missed the half-way cut
R128, R64, R32, R16, QF, SF = Round in which player lost in match play
"T" indicates a tie for a place

Sources: U.S. Open, Open Championship, Amateur Championship – 1910, 1911, 1912, 1913

== Team appearances ==
Amateur

- England–Scotland Amateur Match (representing England): 1910 (winners), 1911, 1912

Professional

- Great Britain vs USA (representing Great Britain): 1921 (winners), 1926 (winners)
- Seniors vs Juniors (representing the Seniors): 1928 (winners)
- Ryder Cup (representing Great Britain): 1929 (winners), 1931, 1933 (winners)
- England–Scotland Professional Match (representing England): 1932 (winners), 1933 (winners), 1934 (winners)
