= 1959 Open Championship =

Coordinates: 56.043°N 2.823°W

Tournament information
- Dates: 1–3 July 1959
- Location: Gullane, Scotland
- Course: Muirfield

Statistics
- Par: 72
- Length: 6,806 yards (6,223 m)
- Field: 90 players, 48 after cut
- Cut: 148 (+4)
- Prize fund: £5,000 $14,000
- Winner's share: £1,000 $2,800

Champion
- (South Africa) Gary Player
- 284 (−4)

Location in Scotland
Location in East Lothian, Scotland

The 1959 Open Championship was the 88th Open Championship, held 1–3 July at Muirfield Golf Links in Gullane, East Lothian, Scotland. Gary Player, age 23, shot a final round of 68 to win the first of his nine major titles, two strokes ahead of runners-up Fred Bullock and Flory Van Donck. It was the first of Player's three Claret Jugs; he won again in 1968 and 1974.

Muirfield was originally scheduled to host in 1957, but it was transferred to St. Andrews because of petrol rationing following the "Suez Crisis" in late 1956. Muirfield was subsequently allocated the 1959 Championship.

Qualifying took place on 29–30 June, with 18 holes at Muirfield and 18 holes at the number 1 course of Gullane Golf Club. There were no exemptions and the number of qualifiers was limited to a maximum of 100, and ties did not qualify. The qualifying score was 147 and 90 players advanced to the first round the next day; defending champion Peter Thomson led with 137 and won the £50 qualifying prize. The maximum number of players making the cut after 36 holes was again set at 50, and ties did not make the cut.

The purse was increased to £5,000, up 150 from 4,850 in 1958; the winner's share remained unchanged at £1,000, but the prizes for second to fifth places were increased. Second place received £700, with 525 for third, 400 for fourth, and 325 for fifth.

Only four Americans were in the field of 90 (Willie Goggin, Bob Sweeny, Bob Watson, and John Garrett) and none made the cut. Sweeny and Garrett were amateurs.

== Course ==
Hole	Yards	Par	Hole	Yards	Par
1	453	4	10	480	4
2	353	4	11	359	4
3	382	4	12	380	4
4	192	3	13	153	3
5	510	5	14	458	5
6	458	4	15	393	4
7	157	3	16	193	3
8	455	4	17	513	5
9	490	5	18	427	4
Out	3,450	36	In	3,356	36
Source:		Total		6,806	72

== Round summaries ==
=== First round ===
Wednesday, 1 July 1959

Fred Bullock and Arnold Stickley led after the first round on Wednesday at 68. A number of amateurs made good starts, the best was Michael Bonallack at 70.

Place	Player	Score	To par
T1	(England) Fred Bullock	68	−4
T1	(England) Arnold Stickley	68	−4
3	(Argentina) Antonio Cerdá	69	−3
T4	(England) Michael Bonallack (a)	70	−2
T4	(England) Sam King	70	−2
T4	(Belgium) Flory Van Donck	70	−2
T7	(Scotland) Jimmy Adams	71	−1
T7	(Republic of Ireland) Harry Bradshaw	71	−1
T7	(England) Henry Cotton	71	−1
T7	(Northern Ireland) Norman Drew	71	−1
T7	(Scotland) Reid Jack (a)	71	−1
T7	(England) Reg Knight	71	−1
T7	(England) Eddie Whitcombe	71	−1

=== Second round ===
Thursday, 2 July 1959

Bullock retained the lead after a second round 70 and Bonallack was one of four amateurs to make the cut. The three 'giants' Bobby Locke, Henry Cotton, and Thomson all made the cut, but all were eight or more strokes behind Bullock.

Place	Player	Score	To par
1	(England) Fred Bullock	68-70=138	−6
2	(Belgium) Flory Van Donck	70-70=140	−4
T3	(England) Michael Bonallack (a)	70-72=142	−2
T3	(England) Reg Knight	71-71=142	−2
T3	(England) Arnold Stickley	68-74=142	−2
T6	(Argentina) Antonio Cerdá	69-74=143	−1
T6	(Scotland) Tom Haliburton	74-69=143	−1
T6	(England) Jimmy Hitchcock	75-68=143	−1
T6	(England) Syd Scott	73-70=143	−1
T10	(England) Sam King	70-74=144	E
T10	(England) Eric Lester	73-71=144	E
T10	(Scotland) John Panton	72-72=144	E

Amateurs: Bonallack (−2), Carr (+1), Jack (+2), Wolstenholme (+4),
Sweeny Jr (+7), Smith (+8), Garrett (+12), Dalziel (+13), Ferguson (+13), Stuart (+13).

=== Third round ===
Friday, 3 July 1959 - (morning)

Gary Player teed off at 9:04 am (and 1:34 pm), two hours before the leaders, who started at 11:04 am (and 3:34 pm). He was out in 37 in his morning round, but came home in 33 and was only four strokes behind the leaders after 54 holes. Amateur Reid Jack of Scotland posted 68 and was only two shots back.

Place	Player	Score	To par
T1	(England) Fred Bullock	68-70-74=212	−4
T1	(England) Sam King	70-74-68=212	−4
T3	(England) Jimmy Hitchcock	75-68-70=213	−3
T3	(Belgium) Flory Van Donck	70-70-73=213	−3
T5	(England) Michael Bonallack (a)	70-72-72=214	−2
T5	(Scotland) Reid Jack (a)	71-75-68=214	−2
T7	(England) John Panton	72-72-71=215	−1
T7	(Wales) Dai Rees	73-73-69=215	−1
T7	(Argentina) Leopoldo Ruiz	72-74-69=215	−1
T10	(Argentina) Antonio Cerdá	69-74-73=216	E
T10	(England) Reg Knight	71-71-74=216	E
T10	(South Africa) Gary Player	75-71-70=216	E
T10	(England) Syd Scott	73-70-73=216	E

=== Final round ===
Friday, 3 July 1959 - (afternoon)

Gary Player reached the last hole and a par four would have yielded a round of 66. However he drove into a bunker and three-putted for a double-bogey six, 68 for the round, and a total of 284. In the last group, Fred Bullock and Flory Van Donck both finished two shots behind Player. Reid Jack won the silver medal for leading amateur by finishing tied for fifth place, two ahead of Bonallack.

Place	Player	Score	To par	Money (£)
1	(South Africa) Gary Player	75-71-70-68=284	−4	1,000
T2	(England) Fred Bullock	68-70-74-74=286	−2	612
T2	(Belgium) Flory Van Donck	70-70-73-73=286	−2	612
4	(England) Syd Scott	73-70-73-71=287	−1	400
T5	(Scotland) Reid Jack (a)	71-75-68-74=288	E	–
T5	(England) Sam King	70-74-68-76=288	E	258
T5	(Republic of Ireland) Christy O'Connor Snr	73-74-72-69=288	E	258
T5	(Scotland) John Panton	72-72-71-73=288	E	258
T9	(Wales) Dai Rees	73-73-69-74=289	+1	137
T9	(Argentina) Leopoldo Ruiz	72-74-69-74=289	+1	137

Amateurs: Jack (E), Bonallack (+2), Wolstenholme (+3), Carr (+10).
