= 1947 Open Championship =

1947 golf tournament held at the Royal Liverpool Golf Club, Hoylake, Wirral, England

Coordinates: 53.385°N 3.190°W

- Front cover of the 1947 Open Programme

Tournament information
- Dates: 2–4 July 1947
- Location: Hoylake, England
- Course: Royal Liverpool Golf Club
- Organized by: The R&A

Statistics
- Par: 68
- Length: 6,978 yards (6,381 m)
- Field: 100, 40 after cut
- Cut: 156 (+20)
- Prize fund: £1,000 $4,000
- Winner's share: £150 $600

Champion
- (Northern Ireland) Fred Daly
- 293 (+21)

Location in England
Royal Liverpool Golf Club in Hoylake, Merseyside, west of Liverpool, England

The 1947 Open Championship was the 76th Open Championship, held 2–4 July at Royal Liverpool Golf Club in Hoylake, England. Fred Daly became the first Irish winner of the Open Championship, one stroke ahead of runners-up Reg Horne and amateur Frank Stranahan. It was Daly's only major title.

Qualifying took place on 30 June and 1 July, Monday and Tuesday, with 18 holes at Hoylake and 18 holes at Arrowe Park. The number of qualifiers was limited to a maximum of 100, and ties for 100th place would not qualify. Norman Von Nida led the qualifiers for the second successive year, scoring 139; the qualifying score was 155 and 100 players advanced. Only five Americans entered the qualifier, and none were former champions.

Par was set at 68 for the championship, which was the course record at the time. The course was regularly par 72 at 7,048 yards (6,445 m); all four par-5 holes were shortened slightly and made into par-4 holes.

The total prize money was £1000, with a winner's share of £150, £100 for second, £75 for third, £50 for fourth, £25 for fifth, and £15 for each of the next 35 players. The £1000 was completed with a £15 prize for winning the qualification event and four £15 prizes for the lowest score in each round. Where an amateur finished in a place where there was a cash prize that money was donated to the P.G.A. Benevolent Fund. The prize money distribution meant that, with a maximum of forty players making the cut, all professionals making the cut received prize money.

Henry Cotton and Laurie Ayton, Jnr shared the first round lead on Wednesday, but in the second round both fell back with rounds of 78 and 80, respectively. After 36 holes, Daly led at 143 (+7), four shots ahead of Cotton and Sam King. The maximum number of players making the cut after 36 holes was again set at 40, and ties for 40th place did not make the cut.

Daly had a poor third round on Friday morning, shooting 78 to fall into a tie for the lead with Cotton, Arthur Lees, and Norman Von Nida. There were a further nine players within three-strokes of the lead. Horne, who began two back, made the first move with a 35 on the front-nine. He took a pair of 5s at the 16th and 17th holes, however, and at the 18th his putt for a three lipped out and finished at 294. Daly began the round with a 38 (+4) on the front, but he recovered on the back and holed a birdie putt on the 18th to post 293. Cotton made the turn in 36 and needed another 36 on the back to tie Daly, but in the blustery wind this proved too difficult and he finished at 297. That left Stranahan as the last player on the course able to tie Daly. He reached the 17th needing to play the final two holes in seven strokes, but a three-putt led to a five and saw him needing an improbable two on the last. He gave it a good shot, with his approach stopping less than a foot (0.3 m) from the hole.

== Round summaries ==
=== First round ===
Wednesday, 2 July 1947

| Place | Player | Score | To par |
|---|---|---|---|
| T1 | (Scotland) Laurie Ayton, Jnr | 69 | +1 |
| T1 | (England) Henry Cotton | 69 | +1 |
| 3 | (United States) Frank Stranahan (a) | 71 | +3 |
| T4 | (Scotland) Jimmy Adams | 73 | +5 |
| T4 | (England) John Burton | 73 | +5 |
| T4 | (Northern Ireland) Fred Daly | 73 | +5 |
| T4 | (Belgium) Flory Van Donck | 73 | +5 |
| T8 | (Scotland) William Anderson | 74 | +6 |
| T8 | (England) Fred Bullock | 74 | +6 |
| T8 | (Australia) Norman Von Nida | 74 | +6 |

=== Second round ===
Thursday, 3 July 1947

| Place | Player | Score | To par |
|---|---|---|---|
| 1 | (Northern Ireland) Fred Daly | 73-70=143 | +7 |
| T2 | (England) Henry Cotton | 69-78=147 | +11 |
| T2 | (England) Sam King | 75-72=147 | +11 |
| 4 | (Northern Ireland) Dick Burton | 77-71=148 | +12 |
| T5 | (Scotland) Laurie Ayton, Jnr | 69-80=149 | +13 |
| T5 | (England) Arthur Lees | 75-74=149 | +13 |
| T5 | (England) Charlie Ward | 76-73=149 | +13 |
| T5 | (Belgium) Flory Van Donck | 73-76=149 | +13 |
| T10 | (England) Alf Padgham | 75-75=150 | +14 |
| T10 | (Australia) Bill Shankland | 76-74=150 | +14 |
| T10 | (United States) Frank Stranahan (a) | 71-79=150 | +14 |
| T10 | (Australia) Norman Von Nida | 74-76=150 | +14 |

=== Third round ===
Friday, 4 July 1947 (morning)

| Place | Player | Score | To par |
|---|---|---|---|
| T1 | (England) Henry Cotton | 69-78-74=221 | +15 |
| T1 | (Northern Ireland) Fred Daly | 73-70-78=221 | +15 |
| T1 | (England) Arthur Lees | 75-74-72=221 | +15 |
| T1 | (Australia) Norman Von Nida | 74-76-71=221 | +15 |
| 5 | (United States) Frank Stranahan (a) | 71-79-72=222 | +16 |
| T6 | (Scotland) Laurie Ayton, Jnr | 69-80-74=223 | +17 |
| T6 | (England) Reg Horne | 77-74-72=223 | +17 |
| T6 | (England) Alf Perry | 76-77-70=223 | +17 |
| T6 | (England) Reg Whitcombe | 75-77-71=223 | +17 |
| T10 | (Scotland) Jimmy Adams | 73-80-71=224 | +18 |
| T10 | (England) Sam King | 75-72-77=224 | +18 |
| T10 | (England) Alf Padgham | 75-75-74=224 | +18 |
| T10 | (Wales) Dai Rees | 77-74-73=224 | +18 |

=== Final round ===
Friday, 4 July 1947 (afternoon)

| Place | Player | Score | To par | Money (£) |
|---|---|---|---|---|
| 1 | (Northern Ireland) Fred Daly | 73-70-78-72=293 | +21 | 150 |
| T2 | (England) Reg Horne | 77-74-72-71=294 | +22 | 87 ½ |
| T2 | (United States) Frank Stranahan (a) | 71-79-72-72=294 | +22 | – |
| 4 | (Australia) Bill Shankland | 76-74-75-70=295 | +23 | 50 |
| 5 | (England) Dick Burton | 77-71-77-71=296 | +24 | 25 |
| T6 | (United States) Johnny Bulla | 80-72-74-71=297 | +25 | 15 |
| T6 | (England) Henry Cotton | 69-78-74-76=297 | +25 | 15 |
| T6 | (England) Sam King | 75-72-77-73=297 | +25 | 15 |
| T6 | (England) Arthur Lees | 75-74-72-76=297 | +25 | 15 |
| T6 | (Australia) Norman Von Nida | 74-76-71-76=297 | +25 | 15 |
| T6 | (England) Charlie Ward | 76-73-76-72=297 | +25 | 15 |

(a) denotes amateur
