= Fred Daly (golfer) =

Northern Irish professional golfer (1911–1990)

Fred Daly MBE
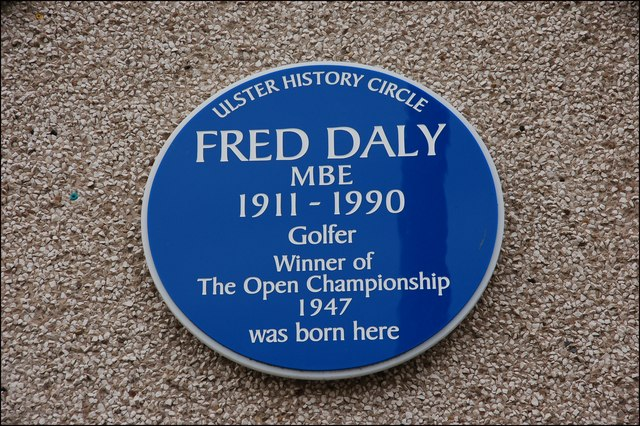
- Blue plaque in Portrush

Personal information
- Full name: Frederick J. Daly
- Nationality: Northern Ireland
- Born: 11 October 1911 Portrush, County Antrim, Ireland
- Died: 18 November 1990 (aged 79) Belfast, Northern Ireland

Career
- Sport: Golf
- Status: Professional
- Professional wins: 28

Best results in major championships (wins: 1)
- Masters Tournament: DNP
- PGA Championship: DNP
- U.S. Open: DNP
- The Open Championship: Won: 1947

Frederick J. Daly (11 October 1911 – 18 November 1990) was a Northern Irish professional golfer, best known for winning The Open Championship in 1947 at the Royal Liverpool Golf Club, Hoylake. Born in Portrush, County Antrim, he was the first Irishman from either side of the border to win the Open and the first to play in the Ryder Cup. He remained the only Irish winner of the Open until Pádraig Harrington won it in 2007 and the only Northern Irish major winner until Graeme McDowell won the U.S. Open in 2010.

== Early life ==
Daly was born in Causeway Street, Portrush on 11 October 1911, the son of Daniel and Anne Daly. His father was a blacksmith. He was the youngest of their six children. He attended a Public Elementary School in Portrush.

== Golf career ==
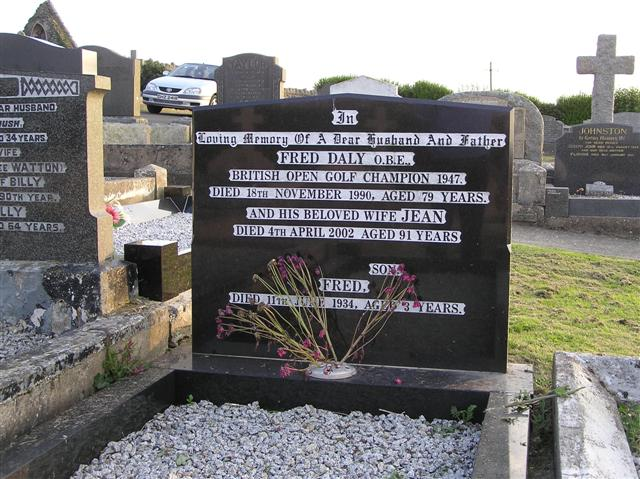
Gravestone in Portrush

Daly was first at Mahee Island Golf Club from 1931 before moving to Lurgan Golf Club in 1934, staying there until 1939. He started competing in domestic Irish events in 1936. He competed in the Irish Open, where he missed the cut, and two weeks later, winning the Ulster Professional Championship, beating Ernie Patterson in the final. At the end of the season he was selected to play for Ireland in their annual match against Scotland. He halved his foursomes match and lost in the singles but Ireland won the match convincingly.

Daly represented Ireland in the Triangular Professional Tournament in 1937 and Llandudno International Golf Trophy in 1938. In early 1939 he moved to the City of Derry Golf Club. Later in 1939 Daly was runner-up in the Irish Professional Championship and fifth in the Irish Open, the leading Irish player.

Domestic Irish events continued during World War II and Daly won both the Ulster Professional Championship and the Irish Professional Championship in 1940. In 1943 Daly was runner-up in the Irish Professional Championship behind Harry Bradshaw and he won the Ulster Championship again in 1941, 1943 and 1944. Daly moved from the City of Derry club to Balmoral Golf Club at the start of 1944.

Immediately the war was over, Daly embarked on his tournament professional career. In September 1945 he travelled to Scotland, for the Daily Mail Tournament, played on the Old Course at St Andrews. Daly finished joint third behind Charlie Ward and could have been higher but for a 7 at the 14th hole of his final round. Daly played his first full season of tournament golf in 1946. The highlight of the season was winning the Irish Open at Portmarnock Golf Club, where he finished four ahead of Bobby Locke, becoming the first Irish winner. He was also fourth in the Spalding Tournament on the Old Course, winner of the Ulster Professional Championship, tied for 8th in the Open Championship, winner of the Irish Professional Championship, quarter-finalist in the News of the World Match Play, tied for fifth in the Dunlop Masters and finished the season by winning the Irish Dunlop Tournament at the Castle Club in Dublin.

1947 was an exceptionally successful year for Daly. He became the first Irish winner of the Open Championship, the first Irish winner of the News of the World Match Play and the first Irishman to play in the Ryder Cup. He was the first Irishman to win an important professional tournament in Great Britain. 1947 was a busy season on the British circuit with a number of new tournaments. Daly played in three events before the Open, finishing third in the Daily Mail Tournament, tied for third in the Spalding Tournament and tied for seventh in the Manchester Evening Chronicle Tournament. The Open Championship was held at Royal Liverpool Golf Club, Hoylake. After a first round 73, Daly scored 70, the best round of the day, to lead by four strokes. On the final morning Daly scored 78 and was in a four-way tie for the lead. Reg Horne set an early target, finishing on 294. Daly had played well on the back-9 until he took a double-bogey 6 at the 17th. Needing a par-4 at the last to tie with Horne, he holed a 10-yard putt to lead by one. The American amateur Frank Stranahan came to the last hole needing an eagle-2 to tie Daly. He nearly holed his second shot and finished tied with Horne for second place. The following week Daly defended his Irish Open title. He led after two rounds but had a disappointing final day and finished tied for 4th place. Daly returned to competitive golf in September, qualifying as the Northern Ireland representative for the final stages of the News of the World Match Play. Daly won his early matches comfortably and then beat Henry Cotton in the semi-final and Flory Van Donck in the final to take the title. He was just the second player, after James Braid in 1905, to win the two most important British tournaments in the same year. Daly finished the British season by competing in the Dunlop Masters, where he finished tied for 9th.

The 1947 Ryder Cup was held in early November in Portland, Oregon. Daly was one of the first seven members of the British team announced by the selection committee in early September. The contest itself was very one-sided with the Americans winning 11–1. Daly was chosen for both the foursomes and singles but lost both matches heavily.

1948 was another successful season for Daly. He won three events, the Dunlop-Southport Tournament, the Penfold Tournament and the News of the World Match Play. He was runner-up in the Open Championship, behind Henry Cotton, and was also runner-up in the R A Brand Tournament, the Daily Telegraph Foursomes Tournament and the Dunlop Masters.

1949 was a less successful season, although Daly won the Manchester Evening Chronicle Tournament in June and was a runner-up in the North British-Harrogate Tournament in late-July. He was again selected for the Ryder Cup, played at Ganton Golf Club in September. Britain won the foursomes matches 3–1, with Daly winning his match, but lost the singles 6–2 to lose a close match. Daly was in the last match in the singles, playing Lloyd Mangrum. Daly was 1-up after 10 holes of the afternoon round but then lost the next five holes to lose 4&3, with Mangrum scoring 3-2-4-3-4. Daly was 8 under-4s for the 33 holes in a low scoring match.

Daly won three more British tournaments, the Lotus Tournament in 1950 and the Daks Tournament and the News of the World Match Play in 1952. At the last-32 stage of the 1952 News of the World Match Play, Daly was involved in the longest sudden-death playoff recorded in a major British tournament, beating Alan Poulton at the 12th extra hole with a long putt for a birdie 3, the match taking over 5 hours. After a quick meal, Daly had to play his last-16 match against a young Peter Alliss, the match starting over two hours late. Daly reached the turn in 31 and beat Alliss 6&5 after an hour and 50 minutes. He continued his success in the Open, finishing 3rd in 1950, 4th in 1951 and 3rd in 1952. He played in the 1951 Ryder Cup at Pinehurst, North Carolina in early November. The British again lost heavily in America, 9½–2½, although Daly halved his singles match against Clayton Heafner after being 3 down at lunch.

In September 1953, Daly reached the semi-final of the News of the World Match Play, losing to Dai Rees. This, and his play in the trial matches, earned him a place in the 1953 Ryder Cup team at Wentworth. In the foursomes Daly and Harry Bradshaw were three up at lunch against Walter Burkemo and Cary Middlecoff but the Americans reduced the lead and Daly had to hole from 3 yards at the final hole to win the match. In his singles match against Ted Kroll, Daly was 6 up at lunch and eventually won 9&7 but the British team lost the match 6½–5½ after Peter Alliss and Bernard Hunt failed to win close matches.

In 1955 Daly led by 6 strokes after three rounds of the five-round Dunlop Tournament at Wentworth. 36 holes were played on the final day. Daly scored 74 in the morning to retain a one shot lead from Eric Brown but took 77 in the afternoon to drop to third place behind Peter Alliss and Brown.

Daly represented Ireland in the first two Canada Cup matches that they contested, in 1954 and 1955, playing with Harry Bradshaw. Christy O'Connor Snr replaced him from 1956. He also represented the British Isles in the first two Joy Cup matches in 1954 and 1955.

After reaching 50, Daly played in the Teacher's Seniors Championship at Harrogate in 1962 where he was runner-up, 2 strokes behind Sam King. In the late 1960s, previous Open champions were exempted from qualifying and Daly took the opportunity to play in the Open five times between 1970 and 1976, missing the cut each time.

== Death ==
Daly died at his Belfast home of a heart attack at age 79. He left a wife and two children.

== Honours ==
Daly was awarded the MBE in the 1984 New Year Honours for services to golf.

== Professional wins (28) ==
=== British PGA circuit wins (10) ===
Date	Tournament	Winning score	Margin of victory	Runner(s)-up
18 Jul 1946	Irish Open	72-73-69-74=288	4 strokes	(South Africa) Bobby Locke
4 Jul 1947	The Open Championship	73-70-78-72=293	1 stroke	(England) Reg Horne, (United States) Frank Stranahan (a)
27 Sep 1947	News of the World Match Play	3 & 2 in final		(Belgium) Flory Van Donck
8 May 1948	Dunlop-Southport Tournament	74-74-69-73=290	Playoff	(Northern Ireland) Ted McNeill
24 Jun 1948	Penfold Tournament	67-66-70-70=273	3 strokes	(England) Ken Bousfield, (Wales) Dai Rees
25 Sep 1948	News of the World Match Play	4 & 3 in final		(Scotland) Laurie Ayton, Jnr
16 Jun 1949	Manchester Evening Chronicle Tournament	74-63-71-69=277	3 strokes	(Belgium) Flory Van Donck
1 Sep 1950	Lotus Tournament	70-67-72-69=278	1 stroke	(South Africa) Bobby Locke
27 Jun 1952	Daks Tournament	67-72-69-72=280	2 strokes	(England) Jack Hargreaves
20 Sep 1952	News of the World Match Play	4 & 3 in final		(Belgium) Flory Van Donck

=== Other wins (18) ===
- 1936 Ulster Professional Championship
- 1940 Irish Professional Championship, Ulster Professional Championship
- 1941 Ulster Professional Championship
- 1943 Ulster Professional Championship
- 1944 Ulster Professional Championship
- 1946 Irish Professional Championship, Ulster Professional Championship, Irish Dunlop Tournament
- 1951 Ulster Professional Championship
- 1952 Irish Professional Championship, Irish Dunlop Tournament
- 1954 Irish Dunlop Tournament
- 1955 Ulster Professional Championship
- 1956 Ulster Professional Championship, Irish Dunlop Tournament
- 1957 Ulster Professional Championship
- 1958 Ulster Professional Championship

== Major championships ==
=== Wins (1) ===
Year	Championship	54 holes	Winning score	Margin	Runners-up
1947	The Open Championship	Tied for lead	+21 (73-70-78-72=293)	1 stroke	(England) Reg Horne, (United States) Frank Stranahan

=== Results timeline ===
Tournament	1946	1947	1948	1949
The Open Championship	T8	1	2	CUT

Tournament	1950	1951	1952	1953	1954	1955	1956	1957	1958	1959
The Open Championship	T3	T4	3	11	T35	T12	CUT	CUT	T20	

Tournament	1960	1961	1962	1963	1964	1965	1966	1967	1968	1969
The Open Championship										

Tournament	1970	1971	1972	1973	1974	1975	1976
The Open Championship	CUT		CUT	CUT	CUT		CUT

Note: Daly only played in The Open Championship.

Win
Top 10
Did not play

CUT = missed the half-way cut
"T" indicates a tie for a place

== Team appearances ==
- Ryder Cup (representing Great Britain): 1947, 1949, 1951, 1953
- Canada Cup (representing Ireland): 1954, 1955
- Ireland–Scotland Professional Match (representing Ireland): 1936 (winners)
- Triangular Professional Tournament (representing Ireland): 1937
- Llandudno International Golf Trophy (representing Ireland): 1938
- Joy Cup (representing the British Isles): 1954 (winners), 1955 (winners)
