= List of golfers with PGA Tour wins as an amateur =

This is a list of golfers who won a PGA Tour tournament as amateur golfers since 1945. No golfer was able to achieve the feat during the 1960s or 1970s, after which one golfer won as an amateur in 1985, followed by another golfer in 1991. Nick Dunlap is the latest golfer to achieve the feat, doing so at the 2024 American Express.

Winning a PGA Tour tournament as an amateur is a feat that has been achieved by eight golfers in this timeframe, with the only golfer to win more than once as an amateur being Frank Stranahan, who did so four times. As the list shows, no tournament has been won by an amateur golfer more than once.

Under PGA Tour rules, if a golfer plays as an amateur, they may not collect their winnings – nor can they turn professional while they are playing in a tournament.

Golfer	Tournament	Year	Source
Cary Middlecoff	North and South Open	1945	
Fred Haas	Memphis Invitational	1945	
Frank Stranahan	Durham War Bond Tournament	1945	
Frank Stranahan	Kansas City Invitational Victory Bond Golf Tournament	1946	
Frank Stranahan	Fort Worth Invitational	1946	
Frank Stranahan	Miami Open	1948	
Gene Littler	San Diego Open	1954	
Doug Sanders	Canadian Open	1956	
Scott Verplank	Western Open	1985	
Phil Mickelson	Northern Telecom Open	1991	
Nick Dunlap	The American Express	2024	
