= Cecil Denny (golfer) =

English golfer (1908–1991)

Personal information
- Full name: Cecil Stanley Denny
- Nationality: England
- Born: 8 August 1908 Great Finborough, Suffolk, England
- Died: July 1991 (aged 82) Norfolk, England

Career
- Sport: Golf
- Status: Professional
- Professional wins: 4

Best results in major championships
- Masters Tournament: DNP
- PGA Championship: DNP
- U.S. Open: DNP
- The Open Championship: T15: 1932

Cecil Stanley Denny (8 August 1908 – July 1991) was an English professional golfer.

His first British win was in the Malden Invitation Tournament in late 1937 where he beat Alf Padgham 5&4 in the 18-hole final. The tournament was contested by 16 invited players over two days. The following year he was one of the runners-up in the News Chronicle Tournament at East Brighton Golf Club, two shots behind Reg Whitcombe.

He was particularly successful in the Dutch Open, winning the event in 1948 and 1952 and being a runner-up three times before the war.

At the age of 46, Denny won the 1955 Spalding Tournament at Moor Park Golf Club by one stroke from Eric Lester, his first important win in Britain.

== Tournament wins ==
- 1937 Malden Invitation Tournament
- 1948 Dutch Open
- 1952 Dutch Open
- 1955 Spalding Tournament

== Results in major championships ==
Tournament	1931	1932	1933	1934	1935	1936	1937	1938	1939
The Open Championship	T36	T15	T48	T42	CUT	T34	CUT	CUT	

Tournament	1940	1941	1942	1943	1944	1945	1946	1947	1948	1949
The Open Championship	NT	NT	NT	NT	NT	NT	CUT	CUT	CUT	CUT

Tournament	1950	1951	1952	1953	1954	1955	1956	1957	1958	1959
The Open Championship	CUT		CUT		44	T45			T39	CUT

Note: Denny only played in The Open Championship.

Did not play

NT = No tournament
CUT = Missed the cut
"T" indicates a tie for a place

== Team appearances ==
- England–Scotland Professional Match (representing England): 1936 (winners)
- Great Britain–Argentina Professional Match (representing Great Britain): 1939 (winners)
