= Car Care Plan International =

European Tour golf tournament

Tournament information
- Location: Leeds, England
- Established: 1982
- Courses: Moortown Golf Club; Sand Moor Golf Club
- Par: 69
- Tour: European Tour
- Format: Stroke play
- Prize fund: £100,000
- Month played: July
- Final year: 1986

Tournament record score
- Aggregate: 272 Nick Faldo (1983); 272 Mark Mouland (1986)
- To par: −8 Brian Waites (1982) −8 Nick Faldo (1983)

Final champion
- (Wales) Mark Mouland
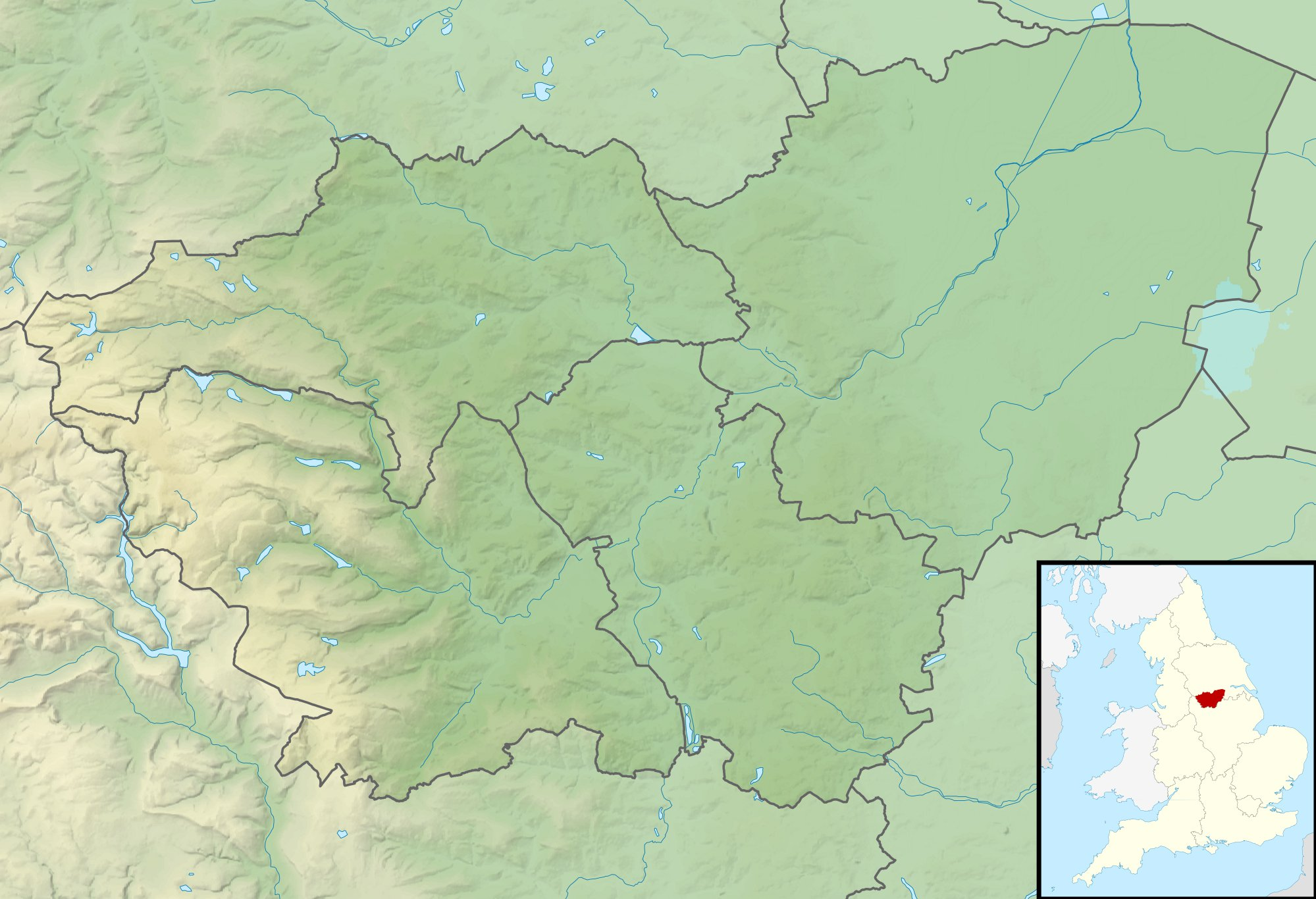
- Location in England Location in South Yorkshire

The Car Care Plan International was a European Tour golf tournament held annually from 1982 to 1986. Hosted by three golf clubs in the English city of Leeds, it saw future six-time major championship winner Nick Faldo clinch victories in 1983 and 1984. In 1986, the tournament's prize fund amounted to £100,000, making it one of the smallest on the European Tour that year.

== Winners ==
Year	Winner	Score	To par	Margin of victory	Runner(s)-up	Venue
1986	(Wales) Mark Mouland	272	−4	1 stroke	(Sweden) Anders Forsbrand	Moortown
1985	(England) David J. Russell	277	+1	1 stroke	(England) Carl Mason	Moortown
1984	(England) Nick Faldo (2)	276	+2	1 stroke	(England) Howard Clark	Moortown
1983	(England) Nick Faldo	272	−8	1 stroke	(England) Howard Clark (England) Brian Waites	Sand Moor
1982	(England) Brian Waites	276	−8	1 stroke	(Scotland) Brian Barnes (England) Paul Hoad	Moor Allerton
