= Laurie Ayton =

Laurie Ayton may refer to two Scottish golfers:

- Laurie Ayton Snr (1884–1962), Scottish golfer
- Laurie Ayton Jnr (1914–1989), his son, Scottish golfer
