= Silver King Tournament =

Tournament information
- Location: Rickmansworth, Hertfordshire, England
- Established: 1936
- Course(s): Moor Park Golf Club
- Month played: April
- Final year: 1953

Final champion
- Flory Van Donck

Location in England

The Silver King Tournament was a professional golf tournament played at Moor Park Golf Club near Rickmansworth, Hertfordshire. The event was promoted by The Silvertown Company, manufacturer of the Silver King golf ball. It was held from 1936 to 1953.

From 1954 Moor Park became the venue of the Spalding Tournament which had been played at Worthing Golf Club from 1949 to 1953. The Spalding Tournament was moved to April, replacing the Silver King Tournament as the season opening event.

== History ==
The 1936 tournament was played on 22–24 April. Both the High Course and the West Course were used on the first two days, each of the entrants playing one round on each course. The leading 60 made the cut and played 36 holes on the High Course on the final day. In the event of a tie for 60th place there was to be a 9-hole playoff on the West Course on the second evening. The total prize money was £1000. Arthur Lacey led after the first two days on 133, six strokes ahead of the field. 10 players tied on 150 for the last 6 places but it was decided to dispense with the playoff and allow all 64 players to make the cut. On the final morning Lacey, one of the early starters, took 75 and was tied with Alf Padgham, one of the late starters, after a 66. These two were three ahead of the rest. Lacey had another poor round in the afternoon, taking 76 and finishing on 284. He was later passed by Alf Perry on 283 who was then passed by Dick Burton on 282. Henry Cotton then took the lead with a score of 281 leaving Padgham needing 11 for the last three holes for victory. Padgham got a good 4 at the long 16th and followed up with a 4 at the 17th and 3 at the short 18th to win by a stroke.

The 1937 tournament was played on 21–23 April. The format was the same as used in 1936. Bob Kenyon led after the first two days on 138. 63 players scoring 152 and better made the cut. As in 1936 the half-way leader had a poor final day, Kenyon scoring 75 and 76 to drop down the field. Four players were tied on 211 after three rounds: Henry Cotton, Bill Cox, Arthur Lacey and Alf Perry with Paddy Mahon a shot behind. Cotton had a final round 68 which the other leaders couldn't match. Mahon got the closest but after taking 5 at the 16th he needed a hole-in-one at the last to tie. His tee shot finished 8 feet from the hole. He holed the putt to finish one behind Cotton but in second place on his own.

== Winners ==
Year	Winner	Country	Score	Margin of victory	Runner(s)-up	Winner's share (£)	Ref
1936	Alf Padgham	England	280	1 stroke	(England) Henry Cotton	200	
1937	Henry Cotton	England	279	1 stroke	(Republic of Ireland) Paddy Mahon	200	
1938	Charles Whitcombe	England	276	2 strokes	(England) Alf Perry (England) Eddie Whitcombe	200	
1939	Alf Padgham	England	285	Playoff (36 holes)	(England) Dick Burton	200	
1940–45: No tournament due to World War II
1946	Dai Rees	Wales	288	7 strokes	(Scotland) Allan Dailey (England) Reg Horne (England) Charlie Ward	350	
1947	Alf Padgham	England	285	4 strokes	(England) Sam King	300	
1948	Jimmy Adams	Scotland	283	Tie		Shared 300 and 200	
1948	Charlie Ward	England	283	Tie		Shared 300 and 200	
1949	Dick Burton	England	281	1 stroke	(England) Charlie Ward	300	
1950	John Panton	Scotland	276	5 strokes	(Australia) Ossie Pickworth	300	
1951	Flory Van Donck	Belgium	285	2 strokes	(England) Jack Hargreaves (England) Wally Smithers	300	
1952	Reg Horne	England	276	1 stroke	(England) Arthur Lees	300	
1953	Flory Van Donck	Belgium	274	6 strokes	(England) Ken Bousfield (England) Bill Branch (England) John Pritchett	300	
