= 1949 Ryder Cup =

Golf tournament held in England

8th Ryder Cup Matches
- Dates: 16–17 September 1949
- Venue: Ganton Golf Club
- Location: Scarborough, North Yorkshire, England
- Captains: Charles Whitcombe (Great Britain); Ben Hogan (USA)
(United Kingdom)	5	7	(United States)
- United States wins the Ryder Cup

Location map
- Location within England

The 8th Ryder Cup Matches were held 16–17 September 1949, at Ganton Golf Club in Scarborough, North Yorkshire, England. The United States team won the competition by a score of seven to five.

Still recovering from his near-fatal automobile accident in February, Ben Hogan was the non-playing captain of the U.S. team. He returned as a competitor for a final time in 1951.

The U.S. team's decision to bring a half ton of meat to England made headlines.

Hogan objected to the depth of the grooves on some British players' irons, and they were modified before being allowed into the competition. Britain led three to one after the first day, but the U.S. won six of eight matches in singles on Saturday to keep the Cup.

The Ganton course measured 6,632 yards (6,064 m) for this Ryder Cup.

== Format ==
The Ryder Cup is a match play event, with each match worth one point. From 1927 through 1959, the format consisted of four foursome (alternate shot) matches on the first day and eight singles matches on the second day, for a total of 12 points. Therefore, 6 1/2 points were required to win the Cup. All matches were played to a maximum of 36 holes.

== Teams ==
In April 1949 the British P.G.A. appointed a selection committee of five. The committee consisted of four ex-Ryder Cup players: Dick Burton, Arthur Havers, Alf Padgham and Charles Whitcombe to which would be added the chairman of the P.G.A. to be elected in July. In mid-July a list of 20 possible players was announced, although other players could be added to this list. Charles Whitcombe was announced as the non-playing captain. The list included Henry Cotton who later withdrew because he was returning to his golf school in Monte Carlo and would "have no opportunity to sharpen up his game." The team was selected immediately after the News Chronicle Tournament, a tournament won by Dick Burton, one of the selectors, by 12 strokes. The team was chosen from the 19 remaining possible players announced in July.

Team Great Britain
Name	Age	Previous Ryder Cups	Matches	W–L–H	Winning percentage
(England) Charles Whitcombe	53	Non-playing captain
(Scotland) Jimmy Adams	38	1	2	0–2–0	0.00
(Scotland) Laurie Ayton, Jnr	35	0	Rookie
(England) Ken Bousfield	29	0	Rookie
(England) Dick Burton	41	2	3	1–2–0	33.33
(Northern Ireland) Fred Daly	37	1	2	0–2–0	0.00
(England) Max Faulkner	33	1	2	0–2–0	0.00
(England) Sam King	38	2	3	1–1–1	50.00
(England) Arthur Lees	41	1	2	0–2–0	0.00
(Wales) Dai Rees	36	2	4	1–2–1	37.50
(England) Charlie Ward	38	1	2	0–2–0	0.00

Team USA
Name	Age	Previous Ryder Cups	Matches	W–L–H	Winning percentage
Ben Hogan	37	Non-playing captain
Skip Alexander	31	0	Rookie
Jimmy Demaret	39	1	2	2–0–0	100.00
Bob Hamilton	33	0	Rookie
Chick Harbert	34	0	Rookie
Dutch Harrison	39	1	1	1–0–0	100.00
Clayton Heafner	35	0	Rookie
Lloyd Mangrum	35	1	2	2–0–0	100.00
Johnny Palmer	31	0	Rookie
Sam Snead	37	2	3	3–0–0	100.00

== Friday's foursome matches ==
	Results
Faulkner/Adams	(United Kingdom) 2 & 1	Harrison/Palmer
Daly/Bousfield	(United Kingdom) 4 & 2	Hamilton/Alexander
Ward/King	(United States) 4 & 3	Demaret/Heafner
Burton/Lees	(United Kingdom) 1 up	Snead/Mangrum
3	Session	1
3	Overall	1

18 hole scores: Faulkner/Adams: 3 up, Daly/Bousfield: 2 up, Demaret/Heafner: 1 up, Burton/Lees v Snead/Mangrum: all square.

== Saturday's singles matches ==
	Results
Max Faulkner	(United States) 8 & 7	Dutch Harrison
Jimmy Adams	(United Kingdom) 2 & 1	Johnny Palmer
Charlie Ward	(United States) 6 & 5	Sam Snead
Dai Rees	(United Kingdom) 6 & 4	Bob Hamilton
Dick Burton	(United States) 3 & 2	Clayton Heafner
Sam King	(United States) 4 & 3	Chick Harbert
Arthur Lees	(United States) 7 & 6	Jimmy Demaret
Fred Daly	(United States) 4 & 3	Lloyd Mangrum
2	Session	6
5	Overall	7

18 hole scores: Harrison: 7 up, Adams: 1 up, Snead: 1 up, Rees: 4 up, Burton: 1 up, Harbert: 5 up, Demaret: 5 up, Mangrum: 1 up.

== Individual player records ==
Each entry refers to the win–loss–half record of the player.

=== Great Britain ===
Player	Points	Overall	Singles	Foursomes
Jimmy Adams	2	2–0–0	1–0–0	1–0–0
Ken Bousfield	1	1–0–0	0–0–0	1–0–0
Dick Burton	1	1–1–0	0–1–0	1–0–0
Fred Daly	1	1–1–0	0–1–0	1–0–0
Max Faulkner	1	1–1–0	0–1–0	1–0–0
Sam King	0	0–2–0	0–1–0	0–1–0
Arthur Lees	1	1–1–0	0–1–0	1–0–0
Dai Rees	1	1–0–0	1–0–0	0–0–0
Charlie Ward	0	0–2–0	0–1–0	0–1–0

Laurie Ayton, Jnr did not play in any matches.

=== United States ===
Player	Points	Overall	Singles	Foursomes
Skip Alexander	0	0–1–0	0–0–0	0–1–0
Jimmy Demaret	2	2–0–0	1–0–0	1–0–0
Bob Hamilton	0	0–2–0	0–1–0	0–1–0
Chick Harbert	1	1–0–0	1–0–0	0–0–0
Dutch Harrison	1	1–1–0	1–0–0	0–1–0
Clayton Heafner	2	2–0–0	1–0–0	1–0–0
Lloyd Mangrum	1	1–1–0	1–0–0	0–1–0
Johnny Palmer	0	0–2–0	0–1–0	0–1–0
Sam Snead	1	1–1–0	1–0–0	0–1–0
