= Arnold Stickley =

English golfer (1926–1998)

Personal information
- Full name: Arnold Frank Stickley
- Nationality: England
- Born: 18 February 1926
- Died: 31 December 1998 (aged 72)

Career
- Sport: Golf
- Status: Professional
- Professional wins: 1

Best results in major championships
- Masters Tournament: DNP
- PGA Championship: DNP
- U.S. Open: DNP
- The Open Championship: T11: 1959

Arnold Frank Stickley (18 February 1926 – 31 December 1998) was an English professional golfer. He finished tied for 11th place in the 1959 Open Championship, having been joint leader with Fred Bullock after a first round 68.

Stickley won the PGA Close Championship in 1960. Mist on the opening morning meant that, with 162 competitors, the opening round could not be completed. The second round was reduced to nine holes to allow it to be completed on the second day. Stickley won a first prize of £275, the Slazenger Trophy, and a special award of £100.

== Tournament wins ==
- 1960 PGA Close Championship

== Results in major championships ==
Tournament	1955	1956	1957	1958	1959	1960	1961	1962
The Open Championship	CUT				T11		CUT	CUT

Note: Stickley only played in The Open Championship.

Did not play

CUT = missed the half-way cut
"T" indicates a tie for a place
