= Spalding Tournament =

British golf tournament

Tournament information
- Location: United Kingdom
- Established: 1946
- Course(s): Old Course at St Andrews; Worthing Golf Club; Moor Park Golf Club
- Format: Stroke play
- Final year: 1960

Tournament record score
- Aggregate: 267 Bobby Locke (1950)

Final champion
- Harry Weetman

The Spalding Tournament was a professional golf tournament played in the United Kingdom. It was played annually from 1946 to 1960. The total prize money was £1500 in 1946, £1250 in 1947 and 1948, £1350 from 1949 to 1959 and £2250 in 1960. The event was sponsored by A.G. Spalding & Brothers.

From 1954 the Spalding Tournament moved to April and replaced the Silver King Tournament as the season opening event. The Silver King Tournament had been played at Moor Park from 1936 to 1953.

== Winners ==
Year	Winner	Country	Venue	Score	Margin of victory	Runner(s)-up	Winner's share (£)	Ref
1946	Dai Rees	Wales	Old Course at St Andrews	300	1 stroke	(England) Henry Cotton (England) Reg Whitcombe	315	
1947	Henry Cotton	England	Old Course at St Andrews	288	5 strokes	(Wales) Dai Rees	300	
1948	Norman Von Nida	Australia	Old Course at St Andrews	289	2 strokes	(England) Fred Bullock (England) Reg Whitcombe	300	
1949	Charlie Ward	England	Worthing Golf Club	273	1 stroke	(Scotland) Jimmy Adams	300	
1950	Bobby Locke	South Africa	Worthing Golf Club	267	2 strokes	(Wales) Dai Rees	300	
1951	Jack Hargreaves	England	Worthing Golf Club	281	3 strokes	(Scotland) John Panton	300	
1952	Antonio Cerdá & Harry Weetman	Argentina; England	Worthing Golf Club	271	Tie	Shared title	Shared 300 and 200	
1953	Bernard Hunt	England	Worthing Golf Club	273	2 strokes	(England) Jack Hargreaves	300	
1954	Dai Rees	Wales	Moor Park Golf Club	272	2 strokes	(Scotland) Eric Brown	300	
1955	Cecil Denny	England	Moor Park Golf Club	278	1 stroke	(England) Eric Lester	300	
1956	Christy O'Connor Snr & Harry Weetman	Ireland; England	Moor Park Golf Club	276	Tie	Shared title	Shared 300 and 200	
1957	Bernard Hunt	England	Moor Park Golf Club	278	3 strokes	(England) Peter Alliss	300	
1958	Frank Jowle	England	Moor Park Golf Club	277	2 strokes	(South Africa) Harold Henning (England) Arthur Lees	300	
1959	Harold Henning & Eric Lester	South Africa; England	Moor Park Golf Club	278	Tie	Shared title	Shared 300 and 200	
1960	Harry Weetman	England	Moor Park Golf Club	273	5 strokes	(Wales) Dai Rees	500	
