= Fred Daly =

Fred Daly may refer to:

- Fred Daly (American football), American football player at Yale, head football coach at Williams College (1913–1914)
- Fred Daly (politician) (1912–1995), member of the Australian House of Representatives (1943–1975)
- Fred Daly (golfer) (1911–1990), Northern Irish professional golfer who won The Open Championship of 1947
