= Lotus Tournament =

Tournament information
- Location: England
- Established: 1946
- Final year: 1952

Final champion
- Bobby Locke

The Lotus Tournament was a professional golf tournament played in England. It was held annually from 1946 to 1952. Total prize money was £1500.

== Winners ==
Year	Winner	Country	Venue	Score	Margin of victory	Runner(s)-up	Winner's share (£)	Ref
1946	Reg Whitcombe	England	Stoke Poges Golf Club	280	4 strokes	(Scotland) Tom Haliburton	350	
1947	Norman Von Nida	Australia	Notts Golf Club	280	5 strokes	(Wales) Dai Rees	350	
1948	Norman Von Nida	Australia	Royal Mid-Surrey Golf Club	271	2 strokes	(Wales) Dai Rees	350	
1949	Max Faulkner	England	Little Aston Golf Club	277	1 stroke	(England) Charlie Ward	350	
1950	Fred Daly	Northern Ireland	Moortown Golf Club	278	1 stroke	(South Africa) Bobby Locke	350	
1951	Charlie Ward	England	Stoneham Golf Club	270	3 strokes	(South Africa) Bobby Locke	350	
1952	Bobby Locke	South Africa	Moor Park Golf Club	266	8 strokes	(Republic of Ireland) Harry Bradshaw	350	
