= Yorkshire Evening News Tournament =

Former golf tournament

Tournament information
- Location: Leeds, Yorkshire, England
- Established: 1923
- Format: Match play (1923–1939, 1949); Stroke play (1944–1948; 1950–1963)
- Final year: 1963

Final champion
- (Scotland) Tom Haliburton
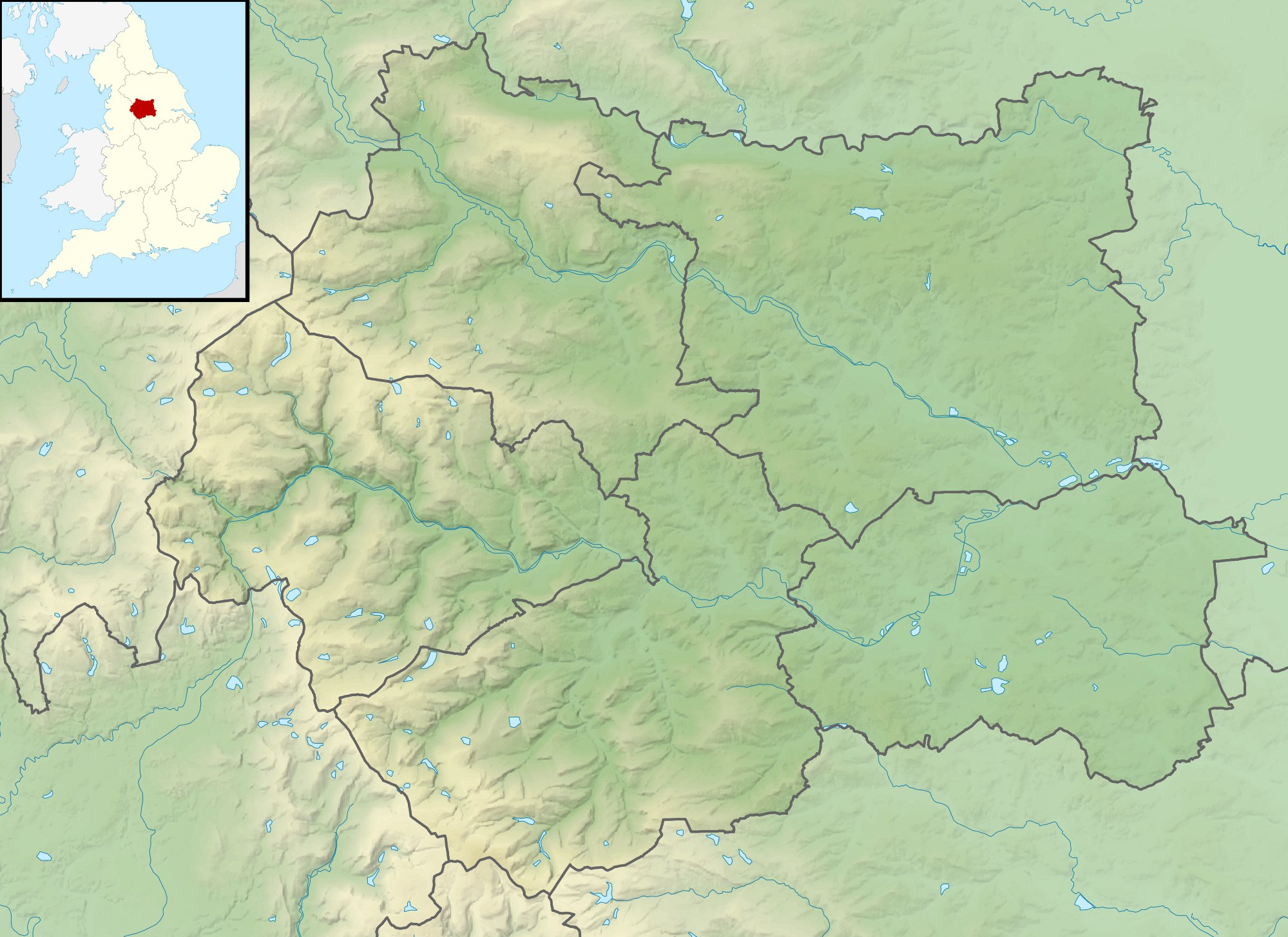
- Location within England Location within West Yorkshire

The Yorkshire Evening News Tournament was a professional golf tournament that was held in the Leeds area of Yorkshire, England between 1923 and 1963. It was a fixture on the British PGA tournament circuit, which would later become the European Tour. Before World War II, it was a knockout match play tournament preceded by a 36-hole stroke play qualifying round; when it was revived following the war it was a pure stroke play tournament, except for 1949 when it was played as knockout match play.

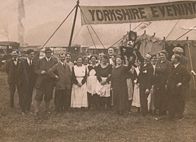
First tournament (1923)

In the early years, the Yorkshire Evening News Tournament was considered a British major golf tournament. "The first tournament, in 1923, was billed as the unofficial ‘Championship of the World’ between American superstars Walter Hagen and Gene Sarazen. Hagen triumphed, but lost in the final by a two-hole margin to Ryder Cup star Herbert Jolly."

== Format ==
From its founding in 1923 until 1939, the Yorkshire Evening News Tournament was contested as match play knockout by the leading players after 36 holes of stroke play. When it was revived in 1944, during World War II, it was a 36-hole stroke play tournament. Following the end of the war, in 1946, it was extended to 72 holes. The 72-hole stroke play format was retained except for 1949, when it was played as knockout match play in order to provide British players with practice in advance of the Ryder Cup.

== Winners ==
Year	Winner	Score	Margin of victory	Runner(s)-up	Winner's share (£)	Venue	Ref
1963	(Scotland) Tom Haliburton	280	1 stroke	(Australia) Peter Thomson	1,000	Sand Moor	
1962	(England) Peter Butler	273	4 strokes	(England) Ken Bousfield	1,000	Moortown	
1961	(Australia) Peter Thomson	282	1 stroke	(Wales) Dai Rees		Sand Moor	
1960	(Australia) Peter Thomson	268	5 strokes	(England) Bernard Hunt	500	Moortown	
1959	(Northern Ireland) Norman Drew	281	4 strokes	(England) Peter Alliss (South Africa) Harold Henning (Australia) Peter Thomson	500	Sand Moor	
1958	(Scotland) Eric Brown & (South Africa) Harold Henning	280	Tie	Shared title	500 & 250 (shared)	Moortown	
1957	(Australia) Peter Thomson	264	15 strokes	(Republic of Ireland) Harry Bradshaw	500	Sand Moor	
1956	(England) Ken Bousfield & (Wales) Dai Rees	281	Tie	Shared title	500 & 250 (shared)	Moortown	
1955	(Argentina) Antonio Cerdá	276	3 strokes	(England) Harry Weetman	500	Sand Moor	
1954	(Scotland) John Panton	284	1 stroke	(England) Ken Bousfield (England) Bernard Hunt	500	Moortown	
1953	(Belgium) Flory Van Donck	278	1 stroke	(Republic of Ireland) Harry Bradshaw	500	Sand Moor	
1952	(Wales) Dai Rees	283	1 stroke	(England) Henry Cotton (England) Syd Scott		Moortown	
1951	(Wales) Dai Rees & (Australia) Norman Von Nida	281	Tie	Shared title	300 & 150 (shared)	Moortown	
1950	(Wales) Dai Rees	276	8 strokes	(England) Arthur Lees		Sand Moor	
1949	(England) Sam King	6 & 5		(England) Walter Lees		Moortown	
1948	(England) Charlie Ward	275	3 strokes	(Australia) Norman Von Nida		Moortown	
1947	(Australia) Norman Von Nida & (England) Henry Cotton	277	Tie	Shared title	200 & 100 (shared)	Moortown	
1946	(South Africa) Bobby Locke	283	7 strokes	(England) A G Matthews (Wales) Dai Rees		Moortown	
1945	(England) Archie Compston	148	5 strokes	(England) Bill Cox		Moortown	
1944	(England) Sam King	133	6 strokes	(Australia) Bill Shankland		Roundhay	
1940–43: No tournament due to World War II
1939	(Wales) Dai Rees	37 holes		(England) Jack Hargreaves	150	Temple Newsam	
1938	(England) Alf Perry	8 & 6		(England) Vernon Greenhalgh		Leeds	
1937	(England) Arthur Lacey	2 & 1		(Scotland) John Fallon		Moortown	
1936	(England) Dick Burton	3 & 2		(England) A G Matthews		Temple Newsam	
1935	(England) Henry Cotton	3 & 2		(England) Percy Alliss	150	Sand Moor	
1934	(England) Alf Padgham	37 holes		(South Africa) Sid Brews		Moortown	
1933	(England) Arthur Lacey	2 & 1		(England) Alf Padgham		Temple Newsam	
1932	(Wales) Bert Hodson	39 holes		(England) Fred Robson		Moortown	
1931	(England) Ernest Whitcombe	39 holes		(England) Tom Barber		Sand Moor	
1930	(Guernsey) Herbert Jolly	3 & 1		(England) Owen Sanderson	200	Headingley	
1929	(United States) Joe Turnesa	37 holes		(Guernsey) Herbert Jolly	200	Moortown	
1928	(England) Charles Whitcombe	3 & 2		(Guernsey) Herbert Jolly		Moortown	
1927	(England) Ernest Whitcombe	9 & 8		(Guernsey) Herbert Jolly		Headingley	
1926	(England) Charles Whitcombe	9 & 8		(Republic of Ireland) Moses O'Neill		Moortown	
1925	(England) Len Holland	3 & 2		(England) James Ockenden		Moortown	
1924	(England) Fred Robson	37 holes		(England) Archie Compston		Headingley	
1923	(Guernsey) Herbert Jolly	2 up		(United States) Walter Hagen	200	Headingley	

== Records ==
- Most wins:
  5 – Dai Rees (2 shared)
  3 – Peter Thomson
- Lowest aggregate score (72-hole stroke play):
  264 – Peter Thomson (1957)
- Largest margin of victory (72-hole stroke play):
  15 strokes – Peter Thomson (1957)
- Largest margin of victory (36-hole match play final):
  9 and 8 – Charles Whitcombe (1926), Ernest Whitcombe (1927)

== Venues ==
Course	Times hosted	First year	Last year
Moortown Golf Club	19	1925	1963
Sand Moor Golf Club	9	1931	1962
Headingley Golf Club	4	1923	1930
Temple Newsham Golf Club	3	1933	1939
Leeds Golf Club	1	1938	1938
Roundhay Golf Club	1	1944	1944
