= Evening Standard Tournament =

Tournament information
- Location: Rickmansworth, Hertfordshire, England
- Established: 1925
- Course(s): Moor Park Golf Club
- Final year: 1926

Final champion
- Abe Mitchell

The Evening Standard Tournament was a professional golf tournament played at Moor Park Golf Club near Rickmansworth, Hertfordshire in 1925 and 1926 and sponsored by the Evening Standard newspaper. Abe Mitchell won on both occasions. The events used a non-standard format. In 1925 it was effectively a 72-hole par-3 event, while in 1926 it was described as a "target" event with a complex scoring system.

== Detail ==
The 1925 event was played over 72 holes with total prize money of £1,000. Except on the par-3, a chalk line was drawn across the fairway at a position where the green was reachable and where, on a par-4 hole, a drive might finish. Thus each hole was a par-3. Players placed their ball on the fairway behind this line. There was a special prize of £50 for the player having the fewest putts. Archie Compston on 103 led Percy Alliss by a stroke after the first day but both had poor third rounds, Compston taking 63 and Alliss 61. Alliss still led after three rounds but Mitchell scored 54 to his 56 in the final round to win by a stroke.

The 1926 event was a "target" competition played over 36 holes with total prize money of £1,000. Points were awarded using a complex scoring system. A ball driven into the proper fairway scored 1 point. Two concentric circles were drawn on each green and a player scored 9 points for being inside the smallest circle in the regulation number of strokes, 8 for being inside the larger circle and 7 for being elsewhere on the green. A player missing the green could score 6, 5 or 4 points for their next shot (3rd shot on a par 4) or 3, 2 or 1 point if they took two strokes more than regulation to be on the green (4 strokes on a par 4). A player single-putting a hole scored 2 points for holing from within the smallest circle, 3 for holing from inside the larger circle and 4 for holing from elsewhere on the green or from off the green. A player two-putting scored 1 point. A player who failed to hole out in one more than the par had to pick up his ball. The system meant that a player might score as many as 11 points for par-4 (1 for hitting the fairway, 9 for being within the smaller circle and 1 for two-putting) they would only score 8 points if they had missed the fairway, then missed the green and saved par with a single putt. On the first day Abe Mitchell scored 173 points and led by 12 from Charles Corlett. Mitchell had the joint best score on the second day, with 164, and won by 18 points from Sandy Herd. The target competition was played in the morning and was followed by an exhibition match in the afternoon. The first day's exhibition match was a repeat of a famous 1906 foursomes match with Harry Vardon and J. H. Taylor playing James Braid and Sandy Herd. The second day's match was a four-ball with Bobby Jones and Walter Hagen playing Cyril Tolley and Abe Mitchell.

== Winners ==
Year	Winners	Country	Venue	Score	Margin of victory	Runner-up	Winner's share (£)	Ref
1925	Abe Mitchell	England	Moor Park Golf Club	220	1 stroke	(England) Percy Alliss		
1926	Abe Mitchell	England	Moor Park Golf Club	337 points	18 points	(Scotland) Sandy Herd	200	
