= Silentnight Tournament =

Tournament information
- Location: Leeds, England
- Established: 1965
- Course(s): Moortown Golf Club
- Month played: June
- Final year: 1965

Final champion
- Jimmy Martin and Dave Thomas

The Silentnight Tournament was a golf tournament on the British PGA circuit played in June 1965 at Moortown Golf Club, Leeds. Total prize money was £5,000.

Tommy Horton led after the first day with a 68. Horton took 76 on a windy second day and dropped a stroke behind the three leaders, Jimmy Martin, Sid Mouland and Lionel Platts who were tied on 143. Martin scored 68 on the final morning to lead by 3 strokes from Horton and Christy O'Connor Snr. Dave Thomas has final round 67 to take the clubhouse lead on 285. When they reached the final hole Horton needed a par 4 to beat Thomas while Martin needed a par to tie with Thomas. Martin missed a birdie putt from 10 feet and finished level with Thomas on 285. Horton, however, drove into a bunker, missed a 5-foot putt and took a double-bogey 6 to finish one behind.

== Winners ==
Year	Winner	Country	Score	Margin of victory	Runner-up	Winner's share (£)	Ref
1965	Jimmy Martin; Dave Thomas	Ireland; Wales	285	Tie		Shared 1,000 and 600	
