= Don Curtis (golfer) =

English professional golfer

Personal information
- Full name: Donald Allen Curtis
- Nationality: England
- Born: 22 October 1904 Poole, Dorset, England
- Died: 18 October 1983 (aged 78) Christchurch, Dorset, England

Career
- Sport: Golf
- Status: Professional
- Professional wins: 2

Best results in major championships
- Masters Tournament: DNP
- PGA Championship: DNP
- U.S. Open: DNP
- The Open Championship: T20: 1927

Donald Allen Curtis (22 October 1904 – 18 October 1983) was an English professional golfer.

In 1926 he lost in a playoff for the Findlater Shield, the assistants' championship. He had tied with Walter Thomas but lost the 18-hole playoff after a disappointing 82.

Curtis's first big success was when he won the 1936 News Chronicle Tournament. Curtis reached the semi-final of the 1937 News of the World Match Play where he lost to Percy Alliss by 1 hole. The following year he won the Dunlop-Southport Tournament at Southport and Ainsdale Golf Club, beating Arthur Lees by 2 strokes and taking the £315 first prize. Later in 1938, he was one of the runners-up in the News Chronicle Tournament behind Reg Whitcombe.

== Tournament wins ==
- 1936 News Chronicle Tournament
- 1938 Dunlop-Southport Tournament

== Results in major championships ==
Tournament	1926	1927	1928	1929	1930	1931	1932	1933	1934	1935	1936	1937
The Open Championship	CUT	T20		CUT			T45	T37	T31		T44	CUT

Note: Curtis only played in The Open Championship.

Did not play

CUT = missed the half-way cut
"T" indicates a tie for a place

== Team appearances ==
- Seniors vs Juniors (representing the Juniors): 1928
- England–Scotland Professional Match (representing England): 1934 (winners), 1938 (winners)
- Llandudno International Golf Trophy (representing England): 1938 (winners)
- Great Britain–Argentina Professional Match (representing Great Britain): 1939 (winners)
