= North British-Harrogate Tournament =

Tournament information
- Location: Harrogate, Yorkshire, England
- Established: 1947
- Month played: July
- Final year: 1954

Final champion
- Eric Lester

The North British-Harrogate Tournament was a professional golf tournament played in Harrogate, Yorkshire, England. It was played annually from 1947 to 1952. Total prize money was £2100. From 1947 to 1949 there were two qualifying rounds on two courses before the 72-hole event. There was a cut after 36 holes. From 1950 to 1952 the tournament was extended to 90 holes. Two courses were used on the first two days after which there was a cut. there was a further cut after three rounds.

In 1953 the sponsor changed and the event was known as the Swallow-Harrogate Tournament. The sponsor was Swallow Raincoats. The format was also changed. There was a 36-hole qualifying stage over two courses on the first two days. the leading 64 players qualified and played six rounds of knockout 18-hole match-play on the next three days. Total prize money remained at £2100.

The 1954 event was played in two distinct parts with separate prize money. There was a 72-hole stroke-play event with £1500 prize money. The leading 16 then played knockout match-play over the next two days. This second stage had prize money of £600, so that the total prize money remained at £2100.

In 1955 Swallow Raincoats switched their sponsorship to the Penfold Tournament which became known as the Swallow-Penfold Tournament. The 1955 event had a first prize of £1000 out of total prize money of £4000.

== Winners ==
Year	Winner	Country	Venue	Score	Margin of victory	Runner(s)-up	Winner's share (£)	Ref
North British-Harrogate Tournament
1947	Norman Von Nida	Australia	Harrogate Golf Club	271	2 strokes	(England) Charlie Ward	500	
1948	Roberto De Vicenzo	Argentina	Oakdale Golf Club	277	2 strokes	(England) Reg Horne	500	
1949	Charlie Ward	England	Pannal Golf Club	281	2 strokes	(England) Ken Bousfield (Argentina) Antonio Cerdá (Northern Ireland) Fred Daly	500	
1950	Bobby Locke	South Africa	Pannal Golf Club	348	3 strokes	(England) Ken Bousfield	500	
1951	Flory Van Donck	Belgium	Oakdale Golf Club	337	4 strokes	(Australia) Peter Thomson	500	
1952	John Panton	Scotland	Pannal Golf Club	343	6 strokes	(England) Harry Weetman	500	
Swallow-Harrogate Tournament
1953	Jack Hargreaves	England	Harrogate Golf Club	2 & 1		(Argentina) Roberto De Vicenzo	500	
Swallow-Harrogate Stroke Play Tournament
1954	Bobby Locke	South Africa	Oakdale Golf Club	276	4 strokes	(Australia) Bill Shankland	250	
Swallow-Harrogate Match Play Tournament
1954	Eric Lester	England	Oakdale Golf Club	2 up		(Argentina) Antonio Cerdá	200	

From 1950 to 1952 the tournament was played over 90 holes. In 1950 one round was played at Oakdale Golf Club. In 1951 one round was played at Pannal Golf Club. In 1952 one round was played at Harrogate Golf Club. In the stroke play stage of the 1954 event, one round was played at Pannal Golf Club.
