= Balmoral Golf Club =

Coordinates: 54°33′53″N 5°58′16″W

Balmoral Golf Club is located on Lisburn Road, in south Belfast, three miles south of the city centre. It is an 18-hole course with a par of 69. The course was founded in 1914.

The course is comparatively flat in nature and has a number of intentionally placed trees. It has a putting green practice area and pitching area.

Balmoral has had a long association with Fred Daly, the first Irishman to win the Open Championship, in 1947. The club has also had four Ryder Cup representatives.
