= The Star Tournament =

Tournament information
- Location: London, England
- Established: 1945
- Courses: Royal Mid-Surrey Golf Club; Wentworth Club
- Final year: 1947

Final champion
- Norman Von Nida

The Star Tournament was a professional golf tournament played in England and sponsored by The Star, a London evening newspaper. It was held from 1945 to 1947. The total prize money was £1,500.

The 1945 and 1946 events involved 36 holes of stroke play over two days. The leading 16 then played knockout matchplay over the next two days. In 1947 the 36-hole stroke play stage was played on a single day using both Wentworth courses with 32 golfers qualifying. There were then four rounds of knockout matchplay over the next two days, followed by a 36-hole final on the fourth day.

== Winners ==
Year	Winner	Country	Venue	Margin of victory	Runner-up	Winner's share (£)	Ref
1945	John Shoesmith	England	Royal Mid-Surrey Golf Club	3 & 2	(England) Bob Kenyon		
1946	Henry Cotton	England	Wentworth Club	4 & 3	(England) Arthur Lees		
1947	Norman Von Nida	Australia	Wentworth Club	6 & 5	(Belgium) Flory Van Donck	300	

The 1945 and 1946 finals were over 18 holes. The 1947 final was over 36 holes.
