= 1958 Open Championship =

Coordinates: 53.7495°N 3.0180°W

Tournament information
- Dates: 2–5 July 1958
- Location: Lytham St Annes, England
- Course: Royal Lytham & St Annes Golf Club

Statistics
- Par: 71
- Length: 6,635 yards (6,067 m)
- Field: 96 players, 40 after cut
- Cut: 147 (+5)
- Prize fund: £4,850 $13,580
- Winner's share: £1,000 $2,800

Champion
- (Australia) Peter Thomson
- 278 (−6), playoff

Location in England

The 1958 Open Championship was the 87th Open Championship, held from 2–5 July at the Royal Lytham & St Annes Golf Club in Lytham St Annes, England. Peter Thomson won his fourth Claret Jug in five years in a 36-hole Saturday playoff, four strokes ahead of Dave Thomas. It was the first playoff at the Open since 1949 and the seventh consecutive year that Thomson, 28, finished either as champion or runner-up. The 278 scored by Thomas and Thomson was a record low for the Open.

Qualifying took place on 30 June–1 July. Entries played 18 holes at Royal Lytham & St Annes and 18 holes at Fairhaven. With over 300 entries, qualifying was played in three-balls, as had also been the case in 1956. The number of qualifiers was limited to a maximum of 100. Ties for 100th place would not qualify. The qualifying score was 148 and 96 players qualified. Peter Thomson led the qualifiers on 133 after scoring 63 on the Championship course in his first qualifying round. His total of 133 was a record for qualifying, surpassing the 134 scored by Bobby Jones in 1926 and by John Panton in 1952. Ken Bousfield, one of the successes of the British 1957 Ryder Cup team and the American Frank Stranahan were amongst those who scored 149 and failed to qualify. Stranahan was suffering from a back muscle strain and took 81 in his second qualifying round.

The total prize money was increased from £3,750 to £4,850. The winner's prize remained unchanged at £1,000 but the prizes for second to tenth place were increased. Second place received £650 with £500 for third, £350 for fourth, £300 for fifth, £250 for sixth, £200 for seventh, £150 for eighth, £125 for ninth and £100 for tenth. The prizes of £30 for the next 15 places and then £25 each for the next 25 players were unchanged. The prize for winning the qualification event was increased to £50 while the four £25 prizes for the lowest score in each round were also unchanged.

The maximum number of players making the cut after 36 holes was set at 50. Ties for 50th place did not make the cut. Just 40 players qualified for the final two rounds by scoring 147 or better. 10 players had scored 148 but that number became 11 when they were joined by Peter Mills after he holed a short putt at the 18th, the last shot of the day. He himself missed the cut but by holing the putt he also eliminated the other 10, who would have qualified had he missed it.

Eric Brown moved into contention after a third round 65, coming home in 30. In the tournament's final round, playing almost an hour before the leaders, he had 2s at the 9th and 12th holes in the afternoon but at the last he drove into a bunker and then 3-putted for a 6, finishing on 279. Thomas and Thomson, in the second to last group, both needed 4 to beat Brown. Thomas two putted from 12 yards for his 4 but Thomson had a 10-foot putt for a 3. His putt just missed and he tied with Thomas on 278. The final group included the overnight leader Christy O'Connor and Leopoldo Ruiz. They both reached the 18th needing a 4 to join Thomas and Thomson. However, unlike the previous group, they both drove into bunkers. Ruiz took two to get out of the bunker and his chance was gone. O'Connor's third from 100 yards shaved the hole but he was left with a 16-foot putt to tie the leaders. The putt grazed the hole and finished 4 inches past. Ruiz eventually took 7 to finish three behind.

In the playoff on Saturday, Thomson was four up after seven holes but Thomas had reduced the lead to one at lunch. Thomson gained another stroke on the first hole of the afternoon round but Thomas picked up a stroke on each of the next two holes to tie the scores. The scores were still level after 7 holes but at the 8th Thomson holed from 8 feet while Thomas missed a shorter one. Thomson got a birdie 3 at the 10th where Thomas again missed a putt taking 5. Thomas then took 5 at the 11th to give Thomson a four shot lead which he held to the end.

Only two Americans were in the field of 96: Gene Sarazen, the 1932 champion, finished ten strokes back at age 56, in a tie for 16th place. Monte Bradley, a 27-year-old Army private from Texas, shot 154 and missed the cut by seven strokes.

== Round summaries ==
=== First round ===
Wednesday, 2 July 1958

Place	Player	Score	To par
1	(Australia) Peter Thomson	66	−5
2	(Republic of Ireland) Christy O'Connor Snr	67	−4
T3	(England) Henry Cotton	68	−3
T3	(England) Max Faulkner	68	−3
T3	(South Africa) Gary Player	68	−3
T6	(England) Tony Coop	69	−2
T6	(Northern Ireland) Norman Drew	69	−2
T6	(France) Jean Garaïalde	69	−2
T9	(Republic of Ireland) Harry Bradshaw	70	−1
T9	(Republic of Ireland) Joe Carr (a)	70	−1
T9	(South Africa) Harold Henning	70	−1
T9	(England) Bernard Hunt	70	−1
T9	(England) Bill Large	70	−1
T9	(Wales) Dave Thomas	70	−1
T9	(Belgium) Flory Van Donck	70	−1

=== Second round ===
Thursday, 3 July 1958

Place	Player	Score	To par
1	(Republic of Ireland) Christy O'Connor Snr	67-68=135	−7
2	(Argentina) Leopoldo Ruiz	71-65=136	−6
T3	(Wales) Dave Thomas	70-68=138	−4
T3	(Australia) Peter Thomson	66-72=138	−4
T5	(England) Max Faulkner	68-71=139	−3
T5	(England) Eric Lester	73-66=139	−3
T7	(England) Tony Coop	69-71=140	−2
T7	(England) Bernard Hunt	70-70=140	−2
T7	(Belgium) Flory Van Donck	70-70=140	−2
T7	(England) Harry Weetman	73-67=140	−2

Amateurs: Carr (+2), Charles (+8), Deighton (+8), Scrutton (+9), Perowne (+10), Fox (+10), Randall (+12), Byrne (+14), Slater (+20).

=== Third round ===
Friday, 4 July 1958 - (morning)

Place	Player	Score	To par
1	(Australia) Peter Thomson	66-72-67=205	−8
T2	(Wales) Dave Thomas	70-68-69=207	−6
T2	(Belgium) Flory Van Donck	70-70-67=207	−6
T4	(Scotland) Eric Brown	73-70-65=208	−5
T4	(Republic of Ireland) Christy O'Connor Snr	67-68-73=208	−5
T4	(Argentina) Leopoldo Ruiz	71-65-72=208	−5
T7	(England) Max Faulkner	68-71-71=210	−3
T7	(England) Eric Lester	73-66-71=210	−3
T9	(England) Peter Alliss	72-70-70=212	−1
T9	(England) Henry Cotton	68-75-69=212	−1
T9	(South Africa) Gary Player	68-74-70=212	−1

=== Final round ===
Friday, 4 July 1958 - (afternoon)

Place	Player	Score	To par	Money (£)
T1	(Wales) Dave Thomas	70-68-69-71=278	−6	Playoff
T1	(Australia) Peter Thomson	66-72-67-73=278	−6	Playoff
T3	(Scotland) Eric Brown	73-70-65-71=279	−5	425
T3	(Republic of Ireland) Christy O'Connor Snr	67-68-73-71=279	−5	425
T5	(Argentina) Leopoldo Ruiz	71-65-72-73=281	−3	275
T5	(Belgium) Flory Van Donck	70-70-67-74=281	−3	275
7	(South Africa) Gary Player	68-74-70-71=283	−1	200
T8	(England) Henry Cotton	68-75-69-72=284	E	125
T8	(England) Eric Lester	73-66-71-74=284	E	125
T8	(England) Harry Weetman	73-67-73-71=284	E	125

Amateur: Carr (+10).

=== Playoff ===
Saturday, 5 July 1958

Place	Player	Score	To par	Money (£)
1	(Australia) Peter Thomson	68-71=139	−3	1,000
2	(Wales) Dave Thomas	69-74=143	+1	650

Thomson won in a 36-hole playoff.

==== Scorecards ====
Morning round

Hole	1	2	3	4	5	6	7	8	9	10	11	12	13	14	15	16	17	18
Par	3	4	5	4	3	4	5	4	3	4	5	3	4	4	4	4	4	4
(Australia) Thomson	E	−1	−2	−2	−2	−3	−4	−4	−4	−4	−5	−5	−5	−4	−3	−3	−3	−3
(Wales) Thomas	E	E	E	E	E	E	E	−1	−1	−1	−1	−1	−1	−1	−1	−2	−1	−2

Afternoon round

Hole	1	2	3	4	5	6	7	8	9	10	11	12	13	14	15	16	17	18
Par	3	4	5	4	3	4	5	4	3	4	5	3	4	4	4	4	4	4
(Australia) Thomson	−3	−2	−3	−3	−3	−3	−3	−3	−3	−4	−5	−5	−5	−4	−3	−4	−4	−3
(Wales) Thomas	−1	−1	−3	−3	−3	−3	−3	−2	−2	−1	−1	−1	−1	−1	E	E	+1	+1

Cumulative playoff scores, relative to par

Eagle	Birdie	Bogey
