= Manchester Evening Chronicle Tournament =

English professional golf tournament

Tournament information
- Location: Mere, Cheshire, England
- Established: 1947
- Course(s): Mere Golf Club
- Month played: June
- Final year: 1949

Final champion
- Fred Daly

Location in England

The Manchester Evening Chronicle Tournament was a professional golf tournament played at Mere Golf Club in Mere, Cheshire, England. It was held from 1947 to 1949. The event was sponsored by the Manchester Evening Chronicle. Total prize money was £1400 in 1947 and £1500 in 1948 and 1949.

== Winners ==
Year	Winner	Country	Score	Margin of victory	Runner-up	Winner's share (£)	Ref
1947	Flory Van Donck	Belgium	279	3 strokes	(United States) Johnny Bulla	500	
1948	Norman Von Nida	Australia	281	4 strokes	(England) Dick Burton	400	
1949	Fred Daly	Northern Ireland	277	3 strokes	(Belgium) Flory Van Donck	350	
