= Brand-Lochryn Tournament =

Golf tournament

Brand-Lochryn
Tournament information
- Location: England
- Established: 1946
- Course(s): North Manchester Golf Club; Royal Mid-Surrey Golf Club
- Final year: 1948

Final champion
- Charlie Ward

The Brand-Lochryn Tournament was a professional golf tournament played in England between 1946 and 1948. In its first year it was held in the weeks lead up to The Open Championship. The prize money was £1,500. Brand-Lochryn was a make of notepaper sold by tournament sponsors, "R. A. Brand & Co.". The 1948 event was called the R A Brand Tournament.

== Winners ==
Year	Winner	Country	Venue	Score	Margin of victory	Runner(s)-up	Winner's share (£)	Ref
Brand-Lochryn Tournament
1946	Bobby Locke	South Africa	North Manchester Golf Club	287	2 strokes	(Wales) Dai Rees (England) Charlie Ward	500	
1947	Norman Von Nida	Australia	Royal Mid-Surrey Golf Club	290	1 stroke	(England) Max Faulkner	500	
R A Brand Tournament
1948	Charlie Ward	England	North Manchester Golf Club	280	3 strokes	(Northern Ireland) Fred Daly		
