= Herbert Jolly =

Professional golfer

Personal information
- Full name: Herbert Charles Jolly
- Nationality: Guernsey
- Born: 15 February 1895 Vale, Guernsey, Channel Islands
- Died: 16 April 1983 (aged 88) Bradford, West Yorkshire, England

Career
- Sport: Golf
- Status: Professional
- Professional wins: 6

Best results in major championships
- Masters Tournament: DNP
- PGA Championship: DNP
- U.S. Open: T42: 1927
- The Open Championship: T8: 1923

Herbert Charles Jolly (15 February 1895 – 16 April 1983) was a professional golfer. He is best known for being a member of the first British Ryder Cup team in 1927. He also played for Britain in the international match against America at Wentworth in 1926.

== Golf career ==
He was born near L'Ancresse, Vale, Guernsey, Channel Islands, and began his career as an assistant professional at the Royal Guernsey Golf Club which was founded in 1890. He fought in the First World War and was then club professional at Foxgrove Golf Club (1919–33), Hendon, Benton Park and then at Branshaw Golf Club in West Yorkshire.

In the 1923 Yorkshire Evening News Tournament, Jolly only qualified for last-32 knock-out stage by winning a five-man, 18-hole playoff for the final place. After winning his first round match comfortably, he only beat Abe Mitchell at the seventh extra hole after Mitchell had missed from 2 feet at the third extra hole. Jolly holed a 9 footer at the 7th, despite being "partially stymied". In the third round, he beat Gus Faulkner at the second extra hole before a 2 and 1 semi-final win. In the final against Walter Hagen, the match went to the 36th hole, Jolly winning by 2 holes. Jolly had been 4 up after 7 holes of the afternoon round but Hagen levelled the match at the 13th. Jolly won the 17th after Hagen was bunkered and then won the last after Hagen three putted.

Jolly was not initially selected for the nine-man 1927 Ryder Cup team that was announced in early March. In May, the health of Abe Mitchell, the British captain, gave some concern and it was eventually decided that he was unfit to travel. Later he was operated on for appendicitis. Seven members of the team left on the Aquitania on 21 May, Aubrey Boomer being picked up in Cherbourg. With the team a man short, the PGA Secretary Percy Perrins recruited Jolly who sailed on a later boat, the Majestic, and arrived in New York on 31 May, four days after the rest of the team. The Ryder Cup was played in Worcester, Massachusetts on 3 and 4 June. Jolly played in both the foursomes and the singles, losing both his matches.

Jolly continued to have considerable successive in the Yorkshire Evening News Tournament. He lost three successive finals in 1927, 1928 and 1929 before winning for the second time in 1930, beating Owen Sanderson 3 and 1 in the final. The match was played on the same day as the 1930 Amateur Championship final in which Bobby Jones beat Roger Wethered.

Jolly won the Roehampton Invitation Tournament in April 1931 and, in early May, after a series of trial matches using the new American-sized ball, he was selected as one of an initial six players in the British 1931 Ryder Cup team. The team was finalised after the Open Championship in early June. As well as announcing the final member of the team it was also reported that Jolly had withdrawn because of a lack of form and had been replaced by Arthur Havers. Jolly had failed to qualify for the Open Championship after scoring 84 and 78 in the qualifying rounds, the only occasion between 1926 and 1936 that he failed to qualify,

He died in Clayton, Bradford, West Yorkshire.

== Brothers ==
Jolly's three brothers, Thomas Blackmore Jolly (born 16 May 1892), William Henry Jolly (born 24 January 1897), and John Henry Jolly (born 23 August 1898), were also professional golfers.

== Tournament wins ==
- 1921 Kent Professional Championship
- 1922 Kent Professional Championship
- 1923 Yorkshire Evening News Tournament
- 1924 Kent Professional Championship
- 1930 Yorkshire Evening News Tournament
- 1931 Roehampton Invitation Tournament

== Results in major championships ==
Tournament	1920	1921	1922	1923	1924	1925	1926	1927	1928	1929	1930	1931	1932	1933	1934	1935	1936
U.S. Open								T42									
The Open Championship	T40			T8			23	CUT	T33	T15	WD		T34	T54	T35	CUT	CUT

Note: Jolly only played in The Open Championship and the U.S. Open.

Top 10
Did not play

WD = withdrew
CUT = missed the half-way cut
"T" indicates a tie for a place

== Team appearances ==
- Great Britain vs USA (representing Great Britain): 1926 (winners)
- Ryder Cup (representing Great Britain): 1927
- France–Great Britain Professional Match (representing Great Britain): 1929 (winners)
