= Eddie Whitcombe =

English golfer (1913–1997)

Personal information
- Full name: Ernest Edward Whitcombe
- Nationality: England
- Born: 31 March 1913 Norfolk, England
- Died: 16 January 1997 (aged 83) Epping Forest, Essex, England

Career
- Sport: Golf
- Status: Professional

Best results in major championships
- Masters Tournament: DNP
- PGA Championship: DNP
- U.S. Open: DNP
- The Open Championship: T15: 1948

Ernest Edward Whitcombe (31 March 1913 – 16 January 1997) was an English professional golfer. He was the son of Ernest Whitcombe and was always known as Eddie.

In the 1937 Daily Mirror Assistants' Tournament, Whitcombe was tied after 72 holes with Albert Chevalier on 289. In the 36-hole playoff the following day Chevalier beat Whitcombe by a shot, scoring 145 to Whitcombe's 146. Whitcombe had a yard putt at the last to tie but missed.

In April 1938, he finished joint second in the Silver King Tournament, two strokes behind his uncle Charles. Later in 1938, he lost 4&3 in the 36-hole final of the News of the World Match Play to Dai Rees. Whitcombe and Rees were born on the same day, 31 March 1913. In 1938, he also played for England against Scotland and for England in the Llandudno International Golf Trophy.

Whitcombe was chairman of the PGA from 1970 to 1972.

== Results in major championships ==
Tournament	1936	1937	1938	1939
The Open Championship	CUT	T29	CUT	CUT

Tournament	1940	1941	1942	1943	1944	1945	1946	1947	1948	1949
The Open Championship	NT	NT	NT	NT	NT	NT	T21	T18	T15	CUT

Tournament	1950	1951	1952	1953	1954	1955	1956	1957	1958	1959
The Open Championship	T17	T24	CUT	T34	CUT		CUT	CUT	CUT	T29

Note: Whitcombe only played in The Open Championship.

Did not play

NT = No tournament
CUT = missed the half-way cut
"T" indicates a tie for a place

== Team appearances ==
- England–Scotland Professional Match (representing England): 1938 (winners)
- Llandudno International Golf Trophy (representing England): 1938 (winners)
