= Moortown Golf Club =

Golf club in West Yorkshire, England

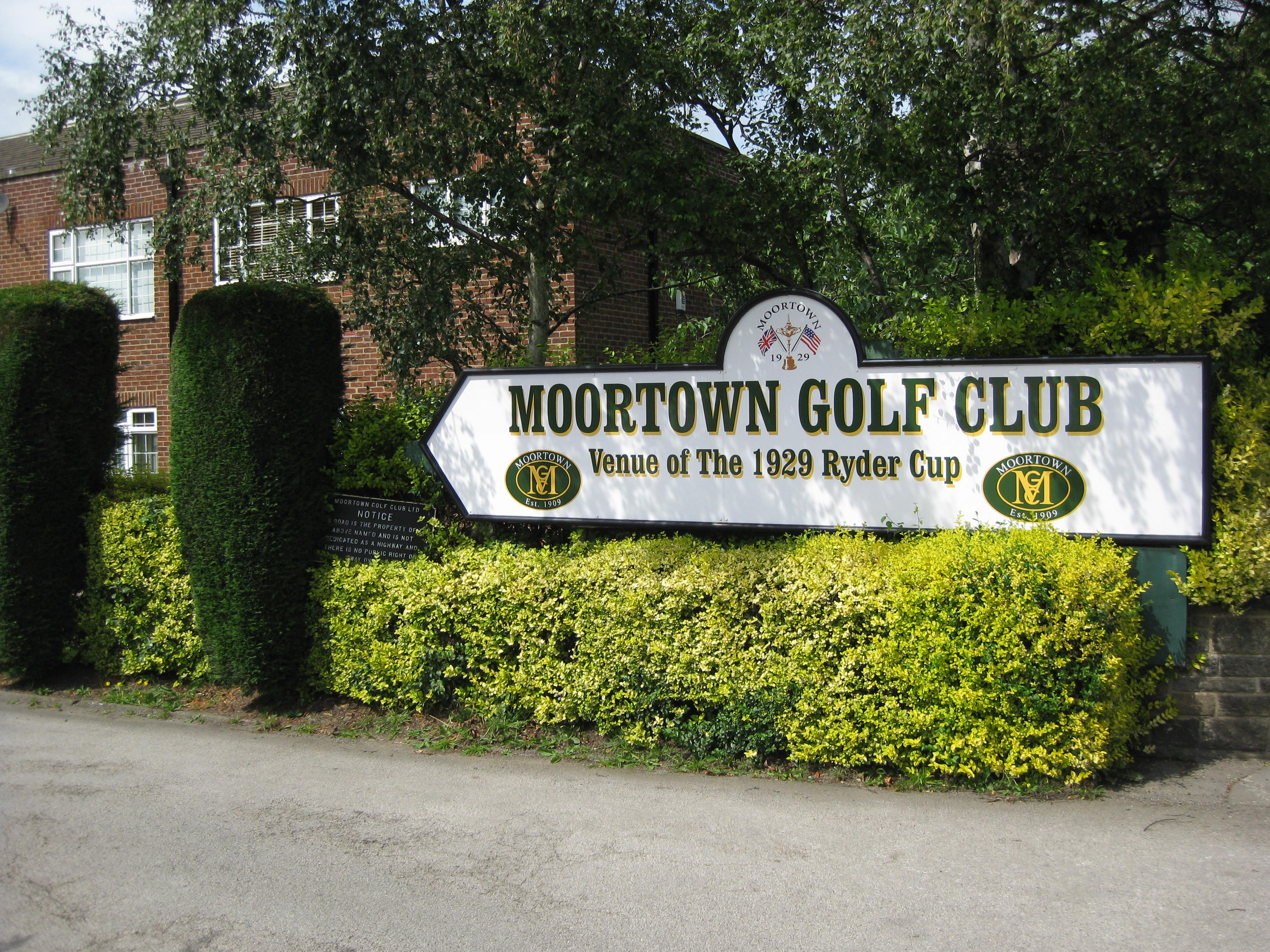
- Sign on Harrogate Road

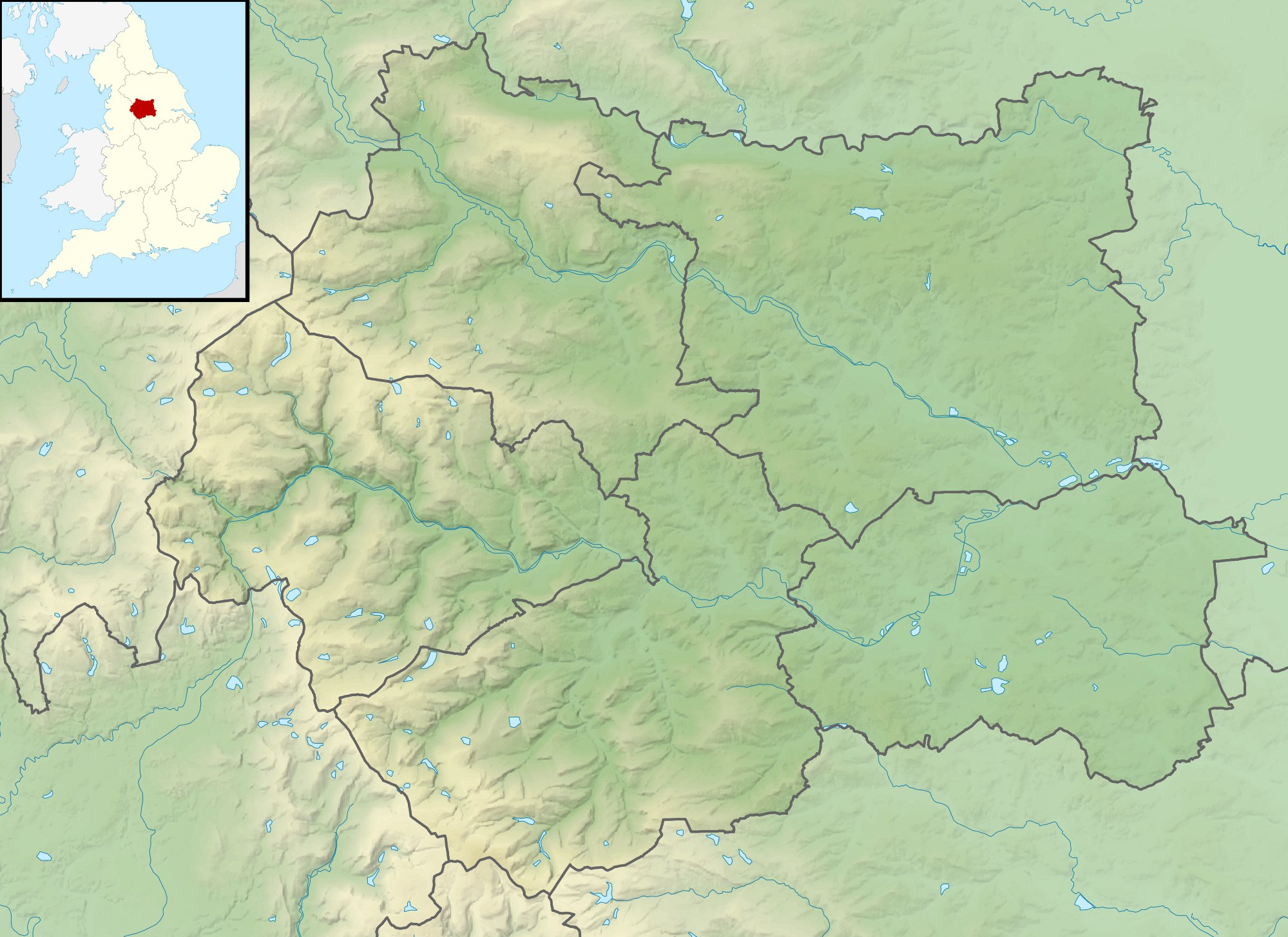
- Location in England Location in West Yorkshire Location in Leeds
- 53.857°N 1.535°W

Club information
- Location: Alwoodley, West Yorkshire, England
- Established: 1909
- Type: Private
- Tota holes: 18
- Tournaments: Ryder Cup (1929); Yorkshire Evening News Tournament; Lotus Tournament; Silentnight Tournament; Car Care Plan International; Haig Whisky TPC; English Amateur (4); Brabazon Trophy (5)
- Website: moortown-gc.co.uk
- Designed by: Alister MacKenzie
- Par: 71
- Length: 7,001 yards (6,402 m)
- Course rating: 74.8
- Course record: 141

Moortown Golf Club is a golf club located in Alwoodley, near Leeds, West Yorkshire, England. It was founded in 1909, and the championship golf course was designed by Alister MacKenzie.

In 1929, Moortown hosted the second Ryder Cup matches, the first to be played in Great Britain. About two thousand spectators saw America gain a narrow lead before the Great Britain team won singles on the final day and thus the competition by a score of 7–5 points.

Moortown was a regular venue on the British PGA tournament circuit, which later became the European Tour, through to the mid-1980s, hosting the Yorkshire Evening News Tournament (19 times between 1925 and 1962), the Daily Telegraph Foursomes Tournament (1949), the Lotus Tournament (1950), the Silentnight Tournament (1965), the Tournament Players Championship (1980) and the Car Care Plan International (1984–1986). The club has also hosted qualifying rounds for The Open Championship as well as being the venue for the English Amateur four times, and the Brabazon Trophy on five occasions.

== History ==
Plans for the establishment of Moortown Golf Club were revealed in 1908. The Alister MacKenzie designed course, built on Black Moor, land that was leased from the Lane-Fox estate, partially opened the following year. Soon after, the full eighteen holes were open for play. Development of the course continued through into the 1930s, by which time MacKenzie's brother, Charles, was overseeing the work.

The official opening of Moortown was commemorated with a challenge match involving James Braid and Harry Vardon in September 1910; the event was originally planned for May but was postponed following the death of King Edward VII.

== Tournaments hosted ==
=== Ryder Cup ===
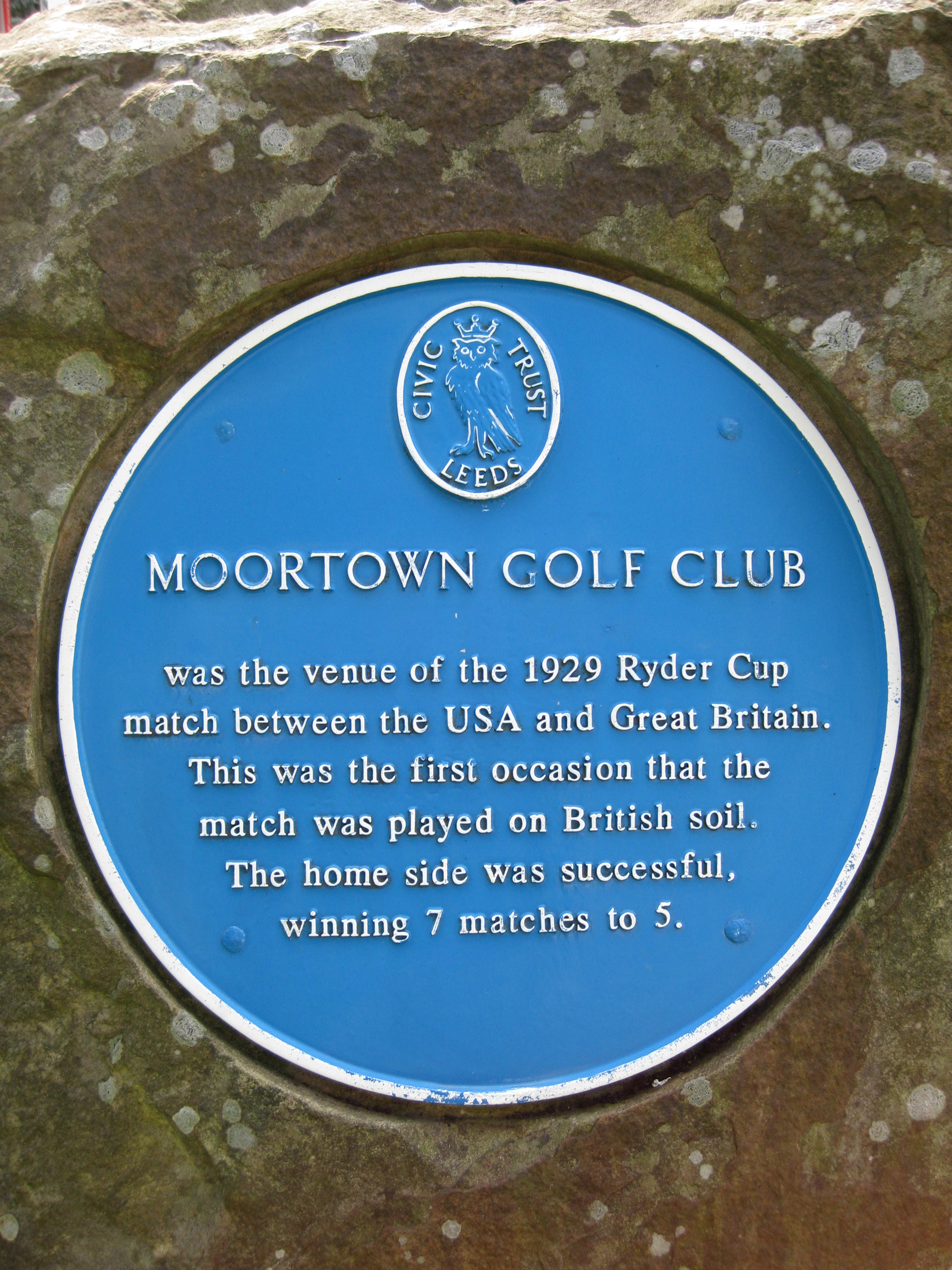
Civic plaque commemorating the first Ryder Cup to be held in Great Britain

Year	Winning team	Score		Losing team
1929	(United Kingdom) Great Britain	7	5	(United States) United States

=== European Tour ===
Year	Tournament	Winner	Score
1986	Car Care Plan International	(Wales) Mark Mouland	272 (−4)
1985	Car Care Plan International	(England) David J. Russell	277 (+1)
1984	Car Care Plan International	(England) Nick Faldo	276 (+2)
1980	Haig Whisky TPC	(Scotland) Bernard Gallacher	268 (−8)

=== Amateur ===
Year	Tournament	Winner	Score
2009	Brabazon Trophy	Niall Kearney	208*
1999	Brabazon Trophy	Mark Side	279
1994	English Amateur	Mark Foster	8 & 7
1980	English Amateur	Peter Deeble	4 & 3
1974	Brabazon Trophy	Nevil Sundelson	291
1969	Brabazon Trophy	Michael Bonallack; Rodney Foster	290 (tie)
1962	English Amateur	Michael Bonallack	2 & 1
1957	Brabazon Trophy	Doug Sewell	287
1938	English Amateur	Frank Pennink	2 & 1

* – Event reduced to 54 holes because of adverse weather.
