= News Chronicle Tournament =

Tournament information
- Location: Brighton, England
- Established: 1936
- Course(s): East Brighton; Hollingbury Park
- Tour(s): British PGA Order of Merit
- Format: Stroke play
- Final year: 1951

Tournament record score
- Aggregate: 266 Dick Burton (1949)

Final champion
- Ken Bousfield

The News Chronicle Tournament was a professional golf tournament played in the Brighton area. It was a fixture on the British PGA tournament circuit from 1936 to 1951.

== Winners ==
| Year | Winner | Score | Margin of victory | Runner(s)-up | Winner's share (£) | Venue | Ref |
|---|---|---|---|---|---|---|---|
| 1936 | (England) Don Curtis | 283 | 1 stroke | (England) Dick Burton (Wales) Dai Rees | 200 | East Brighton | |
| 1937 | (England) Ernest Whitcombe | 268 | 2 strokes | (England) Sam King | 200 | East Brighton | |
| 1938 | (England) Reg Whitcombe | 300 | 2 strokes | (England) Don Curtis (England) Cecil Denny (England) Arthur Lacey (England) Herbert Rhodes | 200 | East Brighton | |
| 1939 | (England) Alf Padgham | 279 | 5 strokes | (England) Percy Alliss (England) Bill Cox | 200 | East Brighton | |
1940–44: No tournament due to World War II
| 1945 | (England) Henry Cotton | 301 | 4 strokes | (England) Percy Alliss (England) Arthur Havers | | Hollingbury Park | |
| 1946 | (Australia) Norman Von Nida | 283 | 1 stroke | (England) John Burton | | Hollingbury Park | |
| 1947 | (Wales) Dai Rees | 275 | 5 strokes | (England) Arthur Harrison | 350 | Hollingbury Park | |
| 1948 | (Scotland) Allan Dailey | 280 | Tie | | Shared 350 and 150 | Hollingbury Park | |
| 1948 | (England) Reg Horne | 280 | Tie | | Shared 350 and 150 | Hollingbury Park | |
| 1949 | (England) Dick Burton | 266 | 12 strokes | (Scotland) Jimmy Adams | 350 | Hollingbury Park | |
| 1950 | (Wales) Dai Rees | 277 | 8 strokes | (England) Ken Bousfield | 350 | Hollingbury Park | |
| 1951 | (England) Ken Bousfield | 279 | 1 stroke | (England) Jack Hargreaves (Australia) Norman Von Nida | 350 | Hollingbury Park | |
