= Holyhead Golf Club =

Golf course in Anglesey, Wales

- Location in Anglesey
- 53°17′27″N 4°37′55″W

Club information
- Location: Holyhead, Anglesey, Wales
- Established: 1912
- Tota holes: 18

Holyhead Golf Club is a golf course to the southeast of Holyhead, in Anglesey, northwestern Wales. It is a 6090-yard par-71 course, which was originally a 9-hole course designed by James Braid in 1912 and opened for play in 1914.

The golf course contains heathland and thick gorse cover. Steve Elliott is a professional at the club.
