= Fred Bullock (golfer) =

English golfer (1918–2006)

Personal information
- Full name: George Frederick Bullock
- Nationality: England
- Born: 12 August 1918 Warwickshire, England
- Died: November 2006 (aged 88) Barnet, London, England

Career
- Sport: Golf
- Status: Professional

Best results in major championships
- Masters Tournament: DNP
- PGA Championship: DNP
- U.S. Open: DNP
- The Open Championship: T2: 1959

George Frederick Bullock (12 August 1918 – November 2006) was an English professional golfer. He died from motor neurone disease. He finished in the top-10 four times in The Open Championship: T-8 in 1938, T-7 in 1950, 8th in 1952, and T-2 in 1959.

Until late 1946 he was an assistant professional at Holyhead Golf Club on Anglesey, Wales where his father George was the professional. Aged 17, he was runner-up in the 1936 Welsh Professional Championship at Prestatyn, behind Fred Lloyd. After two years as professional at Otley Golf Club he became playing assistant professional at Royal Lytham & St Annes Golf Club and then the professional at Glasgow Golf Club in late 1950. At the end of 1955 he moved to Moortown Golf Club. He was later the club professional at Prestwick St Ninians, Caird Park Golf Club and Largs Golf Club.

He had two children: Sandra, who caddied for him in the 1959 Open, and Freida.

== Results in major championships ==
Tournament	1937	1938	1939
The Open Championship	CUT	T8	CUT

Tournament	1940	1941	1942	1943	1944	1945	1946	1947	1948	1949
The Open Championship	NT	NT	NT	NT	NT	NT	T35	T15	CUT	CUT

Tournament	1950	1951	1952	1953	1954	1955	1956	1957	1958	1959
The Open Championship	T7	CUT	8	CUT	T47		CUT	CUT		T2

Tournament	1960	1961	1962	1963	1964
The Open Championship		CUT		T46	CUT

Note: Bullock only played in The Open Championship.

Top 10
Did not play

NT = No tournament
CUT = missed the half-way cut
"T" indicates a tie for a place
