= Sand Moor Golf Club =

Golf course in Leeds

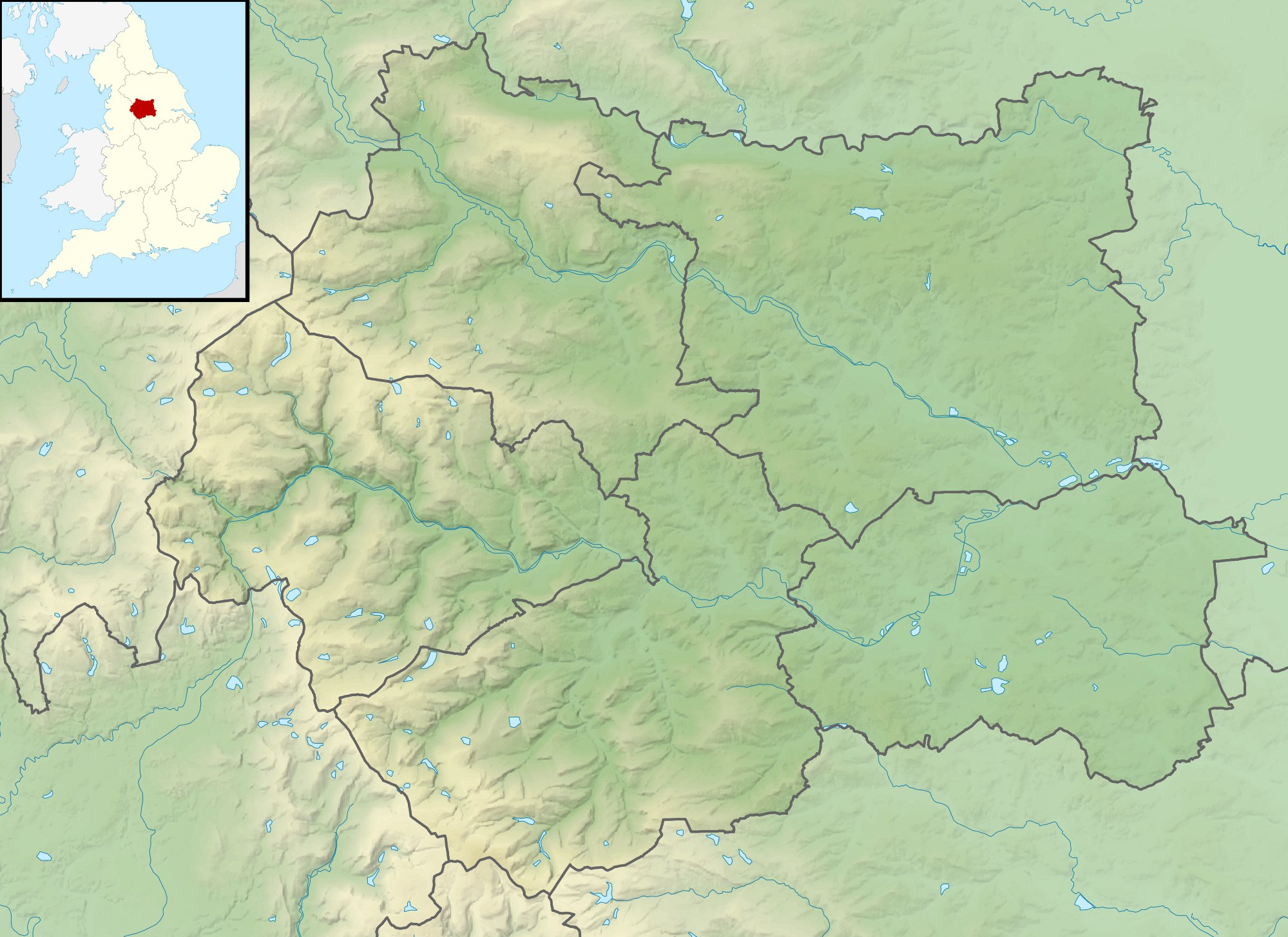
- Location in England Location in West Yorkshire Location in Leeds
- 53.863°N 1.539°W

Club information
- Location: Alwoodley, West Yorkshire, England
- Established: 1925
- Type: Private
- Tota holes: 18
- Tournaments: Yorkshire Evening News Tournament (9 times); Leeds Cup (1946)
- Website: sandmoorgolf.co.uk
- Designed by: Alister MacKenzie
- Par: 71
- Length: 6,446 yards (5,894 m)
- Course rating: 71.6
- Slope rating: 136

Sand Moor Golf Club is a golf club located in Alwoodley, North Leeds, West Yorkshire, England. It was founded in 1925. The 18-hole golf course was designed by Alister MacKenzie.

Sand Moor is regarded as one of the best courses in Yorkshire, and has hosted many important professional and elite amateur tournaments, including the Yorkshire Evening News Tournament (9 times between 1931 and 1963) and the Leeds Cup (1946).

== History ==
In 1921, Henry Barran began construction of a golf course designed by Alister MacKenzie either side of Alwoodley Lane; it was opened to the public in July 1922. In 1925, Sand Moor Golf Club was formed and, with the club agreeing to lease the course from Barran, the intention to make the course private was announced. The club officially opened in March 1926; the event was commemorated with an exhibition match involving George Duncan, George Gadd, Arthur Havers and Abe Mitchell.

In the 1960s, Sand Moor purchased additional land and the club relocated entirely to the North of Alwoodley Lane, with the course being altered under the guidance of Henry Cotton. Further land was leased in 1971, and four new holes were constructed.
