= Norman Von Nida =

Australian professional golfer

Personal information
- Full name: Norman Guy Von Nida
- Nationality: Australia
- Born: 14 February 1914 Strathfield, Australia
- Died: 20 May 2007 (aged 93) Gold Coast, Australia

Career
- Sport: Golf
- Turned professional: 1933
- Former tour: PGA Tour of Australasia
- Professional wins: 48

Number of wins by tour
- PGA Tour of Australasia: 32

Best results in major championships
- Masters Tournament: T27: 1950, 1952
- PGA Championship: DNP
- U.S. Open: T59: 1939
- The Open Championship: T3: 1948

Achievements and awards
- Harry Vardon Trophy: 1947

Norman Guy Von Nida OAM (14 February 1914 – 20 May 2007) was an Australian professional golfer.

== Early life and amateur career ==
Von Nida was born in Strathfield and grew up in Brisbane. He won the 1932 Queensland Amateur aged just 18.

== Professional career ==
In 1933, Von Nida turned professional. He became one of Australia's finest professional golfers and the first Australian to win regularly on the British PGA circuit. In 1946, he travelled to Britain for the first time and finished second on the Order of Merit; in 1947, he returned and won seven tournaments and topped the Order of Merit. He was renowned for his short temper – at a tournament in 1948 he became involved in an argument with future U.S. Ryder Cup player Henry Ransom that resulted in the local sheriff having to pull them apart, and he was also known to hurl his putter into the undergrowth after missing putts, on occasions breaking or even losing them mid-round.

The PGA Tour of Australasia's developmental tour is named the Von Nida Tour after him.

== Personal life ==
Von Nida died in a Gold Coast, Queensland nursing home, aged 93.

== Awards and honors ==
Von Nida was awarded the Medal of the Order of Australia in the 1985 Australia Day Honours for "service to the sport of golf."

== Amateur wins ==
- 1932 Queensland Amateur

== Professional wins (48) ==
- 1935 Queensland Open
- 1936 Queensland Open, New South Wales PGA
- 1937 Queensland Open
- 1938 Philippine Open, Lakes Open
- 1939 Philippine Open, New South Wales Close, Lakes Open
- 1940 Queensland Open
- 1946 Australian PGA Championship, New South Wales Close, New South Wales PGA, News Chronicle Tournament
- 1947 New South Wales Close, Dunlop-Southport Tournament, The Star Tournament, North British-Harrogate Tournament, Lotus Tournament, Penfold Tournament (tie with Dai Rees and Reg Whitcombe), Yorkshire Evening News Tournament (tie with Henry Cotton), Brand-Lochryn Tournament
- 1948 Daily Mail Tournament, Spalding Tournament, Manchester Evening Chronicle Tournament, Lotus Tournament, Dunlop Masters, Australian PGA Championship, New South Wales Close, New South Wales PGA
- 1949 Queensland Open, McWilliam's Wines Tournament, Adelaide Advertiser Tournament
- 1950 Australian Open, Australian PGA Championship
- 1951 Australian PGA Championship, New South Wales PGA, McWilliam's Wines Tournament, Yorkshire Evening News Tournament (tie with Dai Rees)
- 1952 Australian Open, McWilliam's Wines Tournament, Ampol Tournament (Oct)
- 1953 Australian Open, Queensland Open, New South Wales Close
- 1954 New South Wales Close
- 1961 Queensland Open
- 1965 North Coast Open

== Results in major championships ==
Tournament	1939	1940	1941	1942	1943	1944	1945	1946	1947	1948	1949
Masters Tournament					NT	NT	NT				
U.S. Open	T59			NT	NT	NT	NT				
The Open Championship		NT	NT	NT	NT	NT	NT	T4	T6	T3	

Tournament	1950	1951	1952	1953	1954	1955	1956	1957	1958	1959
Masters Tournament	T27		T27						43	
U.S. Open	CUT									
The Open Championship	T20	WD	T9		T35				CUT	

Tournament	1960	1961	1962	1963	1964	1965	1966	1967	1968
Masters Tournament	CUT		CUT						
U.S. Open									
The Open Championship			CUT					CUT	CUT

Note: Von Nida never played in the PGA Championship.

Top 10
Did not play

NT = no tournament
CUT = missed the half-way cut
WD = withdrew
"T" indicates a tie for a place

== Team appearances ==
- Canada Cup (representing Australia): 1956
- Lakes International Cup (representing Australia): 1952, 1954 (winners)
- Slazenger Trophy (representing British Commonwealth and Empire): 1956
- Vicars Shield (representing New South Wales): 1937 (winners), 1938 (winners), 1939, 1949 (winners), 1950 (winners), 1951, 1952, 1954 (winners), 1955 (winners)
