= Fort Worth Open =

Golf tournament

The Fort Worth Open was a golf tournament played at Glen Garden Country Club in Fort Worth, Texas in 1945 and 1946. Prize money was $10,000 with a first prize of $2,000. The 1945 event was played in December and was won by Byron Nelson. In 1946 it was moved to October and was won by Frank Stranahan, an amateur. Jim Ferrier was runner-up and took the first prize. After the tournament, Nelson announced his retirement from most tournament golf.

== Winners ==
| Year | Player | Country | Score | To par | Margin of victory | Runner-up | Winner's share ($) | Ref |
Fort Worth Invitational
| 1946 | Frank Stranahan (a) | United States | 270 | −14 | 2 strokes | (Australia) Jim Ferrier | 2,000 | |
Fort Worth Open
| 1945 | Byron Nelson | United States | 273 | −11 | 8 strokes | (United States) Jimmy Demaret | 2,000 | |
