= Durham Open =

Golf tournament formerly on the PGA Tour

The Durham Open was a golf tournament on the PGA Tour that was played three times from 1944 to 1945. The tournament was held at the Hope Valley Country Club in Durham, North Carolina. Each tournament had a purse of $5,000 with a winner's share of $1,000 (cash value of war bonds).

In 1944, Craig Wood won the Durham Open for his last PGA Tour victory. In April 1945, Byron Nelson won the Durham Open for his 4th of 11 consecutive victories. Later in the year, amateur Frank Stranahan won by a stroke over Ed Oliver.

== Winners ==
Date	Winner	Score	Ref
Nov 11, 1945	Frank Stranahan (amateur)	277 (−3)	
Apr 1, 1945	Byron Nelson	276 (−4)	
Mar 26, 1944	Craig Wood	271 (−12)	
