= Eric Lester =

English golfer

Personal information
- Full name: Eric George Lester
- Nationality: England
- Born: 14 September 1917 West Bromwich, England
- Died: 18 May 1996 (aged 78) Bristol, England
- Height: 6 ft 3 in (1.91 m)

Career
- Sport: Golf
- Turned professional: 1950
- Professional wins: 7

Best results in major championships
- Masters Tournament: DNP
- PGA Championship: DNP
- U.S. Open: DNP
- The Open Championship: T8: 1958

Eric George Lester (14 September 1917 – 18 May 1996) was an English professional golfer. He won some important tournaments in Britain, including the 1956 Swallow-Penfold Tournament, and had a number of good finishes in the Open Championship, finishing tied for 8th place in 1958. He also had a successful seniors career winning the 1974 PGA Seniors Championship. He played for the British Isles in the 1956 Joy Cup but never made the Ryder Cup team. At 6 ft 3 in (1.91 m), he was noted as being one of the taller golfers of his generation.

== Golf career ==
In 1953, his first Open, he started badly with an 83 but then scored 70 and finished tied for 17th place. The 70 won him the Tooting Bec Cup for the lowest single-round score by a British or Irish player, shared with Dai Rees.

The 1954 Swallow-Harrogate Tournament was played in two distinct parts with separate prize money. There was a 72-hole stroke-play event with £1500 prize money. The leading 16 then played knockout match-play over the next two days. This second stage had prize money of £600, so that the total prize money was £2100. Lester finished sixth in the stroke-play stage to qualify for the match-play stage. He beat John Fallon 4&3 and Arthur Lees 5&4 to reach the semi-finals. He beat Dai Rees 5&3 to reach the final and then beat Antonio Cerdá 2 up to win the tournament. Lester was 1 up going to the last hole and when Cerdá put his ball into a muddy patch, he conceded the match.

Lester won the 1956 Swallow-Penfold Tournament at The Royal Burgess Golfing Society course at Barnton, Edinburgh. His total of 275 put him a stroke ahead of Max Faulkner and earned him the £1,000 first prize.

Lester tied with Harold Henning in the 1959 Spalding Tournament at Moor Park Golf Club. Both players scored 278 and shared the first and second prizes, taking home £250 each.

56-year-old Lester won the 1974 PGA Seniors Championship at Lundin Links. His 282 was 4 shots better than Ken Bousfield and gave him the £750 first prize. Two days later he played Roberto De Vicenzo for the World Senior Championship but lost 5&4.

== Tournament wins ==
this list may be incomplete

- 1953 West of England Professional Championship
- 1954 Swallow-Harrogate Match Play Tournament
- 1956 Swallow-Penfold Tournament, Leeds Cup
- 1959 Spalding Tournament (tie with Harold Henning)
- 1963 West of England Professional Championship
- 1974 PGA Seniors Championship

== Results in major championships ==
Tournament	1953	1954	1955	1956	1957	1958	1959
The Open Championship	T17	T20	CUT	T22	T15	T8	T35

Tournament	1960	1961	1962	1963	1964	1965	1966	1967	1968	1969
The Open Championship		T25	CUT	CUT			T47	CUT		

Tournament	1970	1971	1972	1973	1974
The Open Championship					CUT

Note: Lester only played in The Open Championship.

Top 10
Did not play

CUT = missed the half-way cut
"T" indicates a tie for a place

== Team appearances ==
- Joy Cup (representing the British Isles): 1956 (winners)
- Slazenger Trophy (representing Great Britain and Ireland): 1956 (winners)
- Amateurs–Professionals Match (representing the Professionals): 1957 (winners), 1959 (winners)
