= Moor Park Golf Club =

Country club in Hertfordshire, England

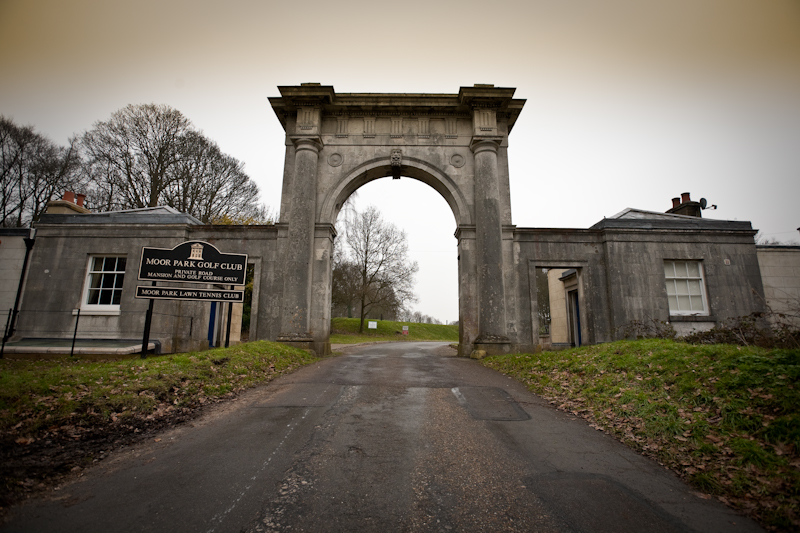

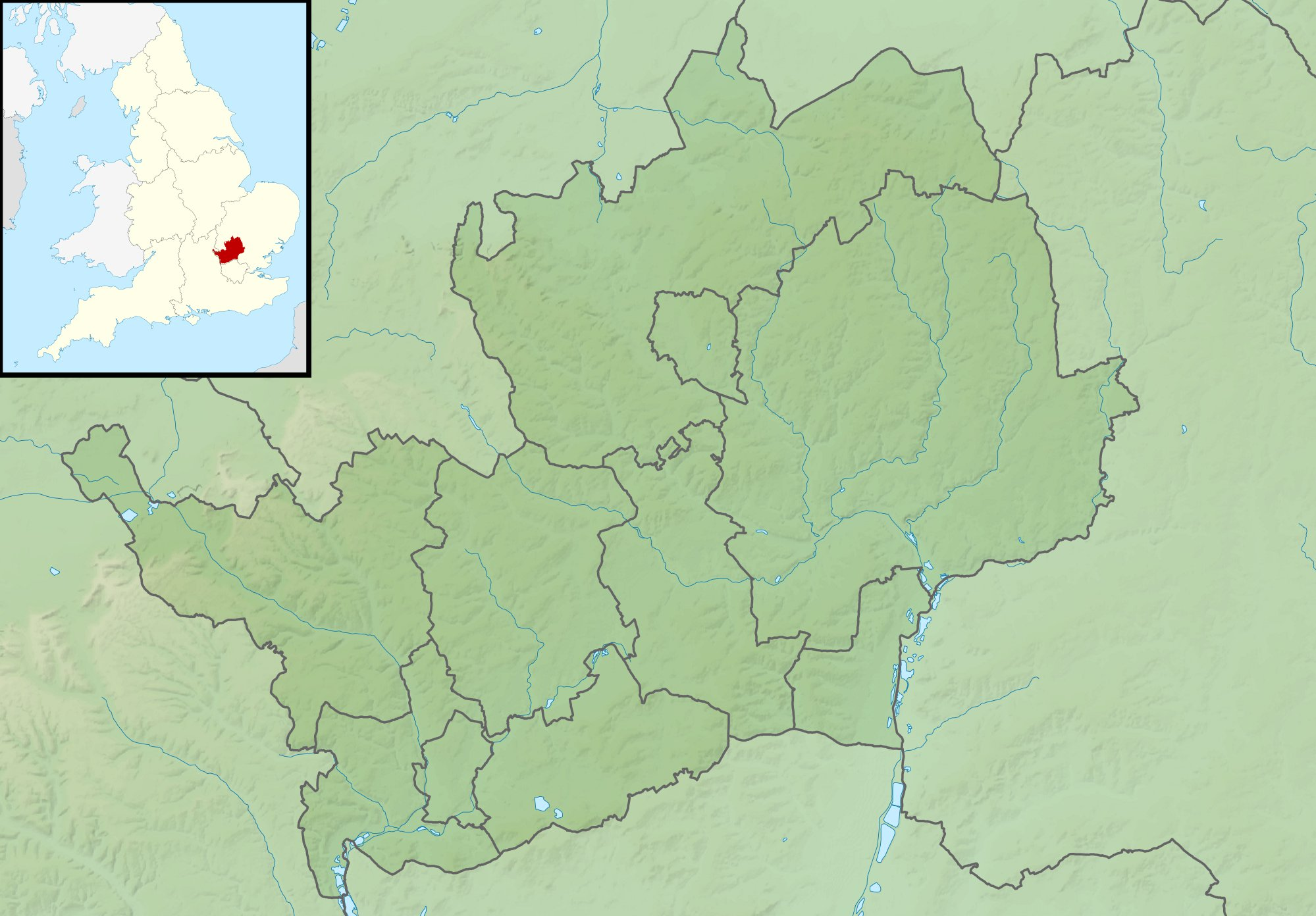
- Location in England Location in Hertfordshire
- 51.628°N 0.449°W

Club information
- Location: Rickmansworth, Hertfordshire, England
- Established: 1923
- Type: Private
- Tota holes: 36
- Tournaments: British PGA Matchplay; Evening Standard Tournament; Silver King Tournament; Lotus Tournament; Spalding Tournament; Esso Golden Tournament; Wills Tournament; Uniroyal International; SOS Talisman TPC; Bob Hope British Classic; Women's British Open (1985); British Women's Matchplay; Spalding Women's Open Stroke Play; Carris Trophy
- Website: moorparkgc.co.uk

High Course
- Designed by: Harry Colt
- Par: 72
- Length: 6,717 yards (6,142 m)
- Course rating: 74.8
- Slope rating: 142

West Course
- Designed by: Harry Colt
- Par: 69
- Length: 5,833 yards (5,334 m)
- Course rating: 68.8
- Slope rating: 121

Moor Park Golf Club is a country club located in Rickmansworth, Hertfordshire, England. It has two eighteen-hole golf courses, the High Course and the West Course, of which the High Course has hosted many professional and elite amateur tournaments, including the Women's British Open in 1985.

== History ==
Moor Park Country Club was founded in 1923, with three golf courses set within the Moor Park estate, and Moor Park Mansion as its clubhouse. Sandy Herd was the club's first professional.

The club was reformed as Moor Park Golf Club after the courses were acquired by the local authority in 1937 for use as a public open space, intended to be part of London's green belt. The club retained the use of two courses, with the third becoming a municipal facility.

The club currently has approximately 1500 members, of whom 1000 are golfers, the remainder being composed of tennis members and social members. The club is run by a board of directors, all of whom are unpaid club members.

== Golf courses ==
The golf courses at Moor Park are wooded parkland in nature and were designed by Harry Colt. The High Course is the longer of the two, and is considered "championship standard". The West Course was created from the first nine holes of the original No. 2 (West) Course, a few holes from the old No. 3 (East) Course, and several new holes.

== Major tournaments hosted ==
Moor Park was a regular venue on the British PGA tournament circuit, which later became the European Tour, through to the end of the 1980s, hosting the British PGA Matchplay Championship (1925, 1932, 1970, 1972), Evening Standard Tournament (1925–1926), Silver King Tournament (1936–1953), Lotus Tournament (1952), Spalding Tournament (1954–1960), Esso Golden Tournament (1961–1967), Wills Tournament (1969), Uniroyal International (1976–1977), SOS Talisman TPC (1979) and Bob Hope British Classic (1981–1990). It has also hosted many elite women's events, including the Women's British Open in 1985, the British Women's Matchplay and the Spalding Women's Open Stroke Play; and elite amateur events, including the Carris Trophy from 1935 to 1987 and every fourth year subsequently.

== In popular culture ==
Moor Park was featured in Sir John Betjeman's BBC TV documentary Metro-land (1973).

Moor Park doubled as the Drumnadrochit Hotel in the 2point4 Children episode “Malcolm X” (Series 7, Episode 3, aired 12 March 1998).
