= Worthing Golf Club =

Golf club in West Sussex, England

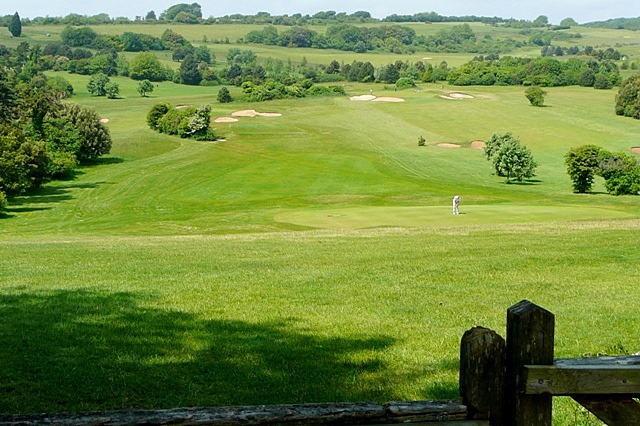
- The Lower Course of Worthing Golf Club extends up a dry valley in the South Downs
- Interactive map of Worthing Golf Club
- 50.8423°N 0.3878°W

Club information
- Location: Worthing, West Sussex, England
- Established: 1905; 121 years ago
- Type: Private
- Tota holes: 36
- Website: worthinggolf.com

Lower Course
- Designed by: Harry Colt
- Par: 71
- Length: 6,505 yards [CONVERT] Longest hole is No. 6

Upper course
- Designed by: Harry Vardon
- Par: 66
- Length: 5,211 yards Longest hole is No. 11

Worthing Golf Club is a historic private members' golf club in Worthing, West Sussex, within the South Downs National Park in Southern England. Established in 1905, the club is situated near the Iron Age hill fort of Cissbury Ring, offering panoramic views of both the South Downs and the English Channel.

The club features two 18-hole downland courses and a comprehensive range of practice facilities. Its clubhouse, originally the 19th-century Warren farmhouse, was refurbished in 2023 and serves as the social and hospitality hub of the club. Worthing Golf Club has a long-standing presence in Sussex golf and regularly hosts county-level competitions.

== History ==
Worthing Golf Club's original 18-hole course was designed by six-time Open Champion Harry Vardon and officially opened in 1906 with an exhibition match between Vardon and five-time Open Champion James Braid.

After World War I, renowned course architect Harry Colt was commissioned to redesign the layout. In 1923, he introduced two distinct 18-hole courses:

- Lower (Colt) Course: Situated primarily in a valley, known for its strategic bunkering and varied topography.
- Upper (Vardon) Course: Routed along the ridges, offering panoramic views across Southern England, from Beachy Head to the Isle of Wight.

These developments marked a shift in course design at the time, blending traditional downland features with Colt's innovative design philosophy.

== Courses and facilities ==
Worthing Golf Club offers two well-draining 18-hole downland courses:

- Colt Course – Par 71, measuring 6521 yards
- Vardon Course – Par 66, measuring 5206 yards

Additional golfing facilities include a six-hole academy course, a covered driving range, short-game practice areas, and multiple putting greens.

The clubhouse, housed in the former Warren farmhouse, was extensively modernised in 2023. It now features a contemporary terrace, bar and dining areas, snooker room and private event space. An in-house kitchen team provides freshly prepared, locally sourced meals daily from 8 am.

== Membership and Community ==
With over 1500 members, Worthing Golf Club caters to golfers of all ages and abilities. The Golf Academy offers comprehensive coaching programmes for juniors, beginners and seasoned players, delivered by PGA-qualified professionals.

The on-site Rampion Golf Pro shop has received recognition within the golf retail industry for its service and range of equipment.

The club also has a strong community and charitable focus. Each year, the Club Captain and Lady Captain select a charity for dedicated fundraising efforts. In 2024, members raised over £28,000 for the local homelessness charity Turning Tides.
