= Frank Stranahan =

American golfer and powerlifter

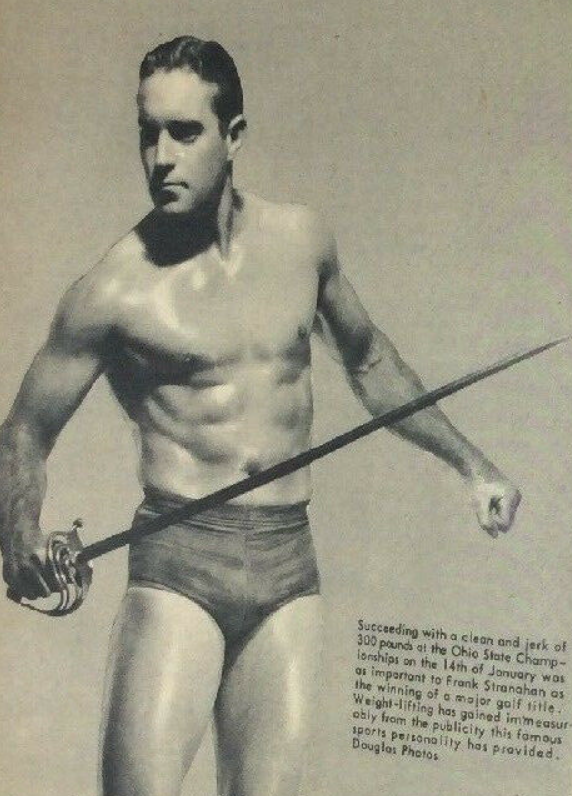
- Stranahan in 1951

Personal information
- Full name: Frank Richard Stranahan
- Nationality: United States
- Born: August 5, 1922 Toledo, Ohio, U.S.
- Died: June 23, 2013 (aged 90) West Palm Beach, Florida, U.S.
- Spouse: Ann
- Children: 3

Career
- Sport: Golf
- College: University of Miami; Harvard University; University of Pennsylvania
- Turned professional: 1954
- Former tour: PGA Tour
- Professional wins: 9

Number of wins by tour
- PGA Tour: 6
- Other: 3

Best results in major championships (wins: 2)
- Masters Tournament: T2: 1947
- PGA Championship: DNP
- U.S. Open: T10: 1958
- The Open Championship: T2: 1947, 1953
- U.S. Amateur: 2nd: 1950
- British Amateur: Won: 1948, 1950

Frank Richard Stranahan (August 5, 1922 – June 23, 2013) was an American sportsman. He had significant success in both amateur and professional golf. He was ranked number one in his weight class in powerlifting, from 1945 to 1954, and he became known on the golf course and off as the "Toledo strongman" long before the modern game of golf and fitness. After he retired from tournament golf in the early 1960s, he became a prolific long-distance runner, competing in 102 marathons.

== Early life ==
Stranahan was born in Toledo, Ohio, on August 5, 1922. He was born into a very wealthy family. His father, Robert A. Stranahan Sr., and his uncle, Frank D. Stranahan, co-founded the highly successful Champion Spark Plug company. His uncle Frank was married to the actress and soprano Marie Celeste.

Frank's father's millions allowed Frank to concentrate on golf, and while in his teens he set a goal of becoming the best golfer in the world. He grew up playing the famous Inverness Club in Toledo, and won several club championships there. He received instruction as a junior at Inverness in the early 1940s from Byron Nelson, the club's professional, who was also playing the PGA Tour at that time.

Stranahan played college golf for the University of Miami. Nelson later mentored several other young players who went on to significant competitive success, including World Golf Hall of Fame members Ken Venturi, Tom Watson, and Marty Fleckman.

== Amateur career ==
During his amateur golf career, spanning from 1936 to 1954, Stranahan won over 70 amateur tournaments, and several Open events as well, competing against professionals. Stranahan was able to remain amateur by forgoing the prize money he could have won as a professional, due to his family wealth. His greatest accomplishments included appearing as a finalist in over a dozen national championships, winning seven. He won two major championships (as they were counted at the time): the 1948 and 1950 British Amateurs. Stranahan was runner-up in five other major championships, including the British Amateur, the Masters Tournament, The Open Championship, and the U.S. Amateur. He won the Canadian Amateur Championship in 1947 and 1948. He won the Tam O'Shanter All-American Amateur six consecutive years from 1948 to 1953; this was a significant extravaganza hosted by impresario George S. May. His globetrotting allowed him to compete in over 200 tournaments across three continents during his amateur career.

He remained an amateur most of his career, during which time he played on three winning Walker Cup teams in 1947, 1949, and 1951.

== Professional career ==
In September 1954, at age 32, he turned pro after losing to 24-year-old Arnold Palmer in the round of 16 at the U.S. Amateur the previous week. He is the only amateur golfer in PGA history to win a professional event as an amateur more than once. Stranahan's dream was to win this championship; his closest was a 1950 finals loss in extra holes to Sam Urzetta. Stranahan stated at the time of turning pro that one of his reasons for making the switch was a desire for the Tour players to develop greater respect for him, since if he won a Tour event as an amateur, the runner-up received the first-place money. As a pro, his greatest victory was the 1958 Los Angeles Open.

Stranahan worked with several golf instructors in an attempt to find the perfect swing; he was characterized by his fellow competitors as someone who experimented too much with his game, with a 'made' swing as opposed to a 'natural' swing, although his short game was very well respected. Stranahan became good friends with the young Gary Player, then, in the mid-1950s, just beginning to make his mark on the professional circuit, with advice on fitness, which Player successfully incorporated into his own training and preparation which Player had been training on since a boy. Stranahan drew chuckles from many by traveling to golf tournaments with his weightlifting equipment, but was in fact pioneering an eventual method which would become the norm several decades later, with the Tour supplying staffed workout facilities to players at Tour events by the 1980s.

Stranahan was known as something of a playboy during his amateur years, before settling down with his marriage in 1954. He was seen as arrogant by many fellow competitors, who often struggled to make ends meet, well before the evolution of golf into its modern big-money era.

=== Run-ins with Masters administrators ===
Several times during his amateur career, Stranahan ran afoul of Clifford Roberts, the chairman of Augusta National Golf Club and the Masters Tournament, because of his unsportsmanlike conduct, which violated club and tournament rules. Notably, Stranahan was warned, and then finally suspended from the tournament in 1948, for playing more than one ball during practice rounds, although he had finished as runner-up the previous year. Stranahan appealed unsuccessfully to Bobby Jones, as well as fellow competitors, to be reinstated. Stranahan was invited to compete again the following year, despite the controversy, which continued, due to his failure to respect the rules. After Stranahan's father was approached by Jones over the matter, the younger Stranahan eventually wrote letters of apology to Jones, and behaved properly thereafter at the tournament, while maintaining there was much more to this situation which remained behind the scenes, without ever specifying the details of this. Stranahan retired from competitive golf in the early 1960s.

=== Post-golf career ===
After leaving competitive golf, he concentrated on business. He studied at Harvard University and the Wharton Business School at the University of Pennsylvania.

== Personal life ==
Stranahan married his wife Ann Williams in 1954. Like Stranahan, she was also a top-class amateur golfer, finishing as the runner-up in the 1960 Canadian Women's Amateur. At age 45, Ann died from cancer. His eldest son Frank Jr. died from cancer at age 11. His second son Jimmy died of a drug overdose in Houston at age 19. Stranahan's father also died from cancer. His youngest son Lance works in real estate in Florida.

== Death and legacy ==
Stranahan died June 23, 2013, aged 90, at his home in Miami Beach, Florida.

Stranahan helped save the Open Championship. After World War II when few American golfers competed in the event, Stranahan competed in eight consecutive Open Championships, and was runner-up in 1947 and 1953. His personal support, along with the 1961 and 1962 wins of Arnold Palmer, revived, sustained, and returned the greatness of the Open Championship through encouraging other top Americans to compete, despite the low prize funds of that era.

== Amateur wins ==
this list is incomplete

- 1941 Trans-Mississippi Amateur, Ohio Amateur
- 1942 Ohio Amateur, South Florida Championship
- 1946 Mexican Amateur, Western Amateur, North and South Amateur, Great Lakes Amateur
- 1947 Canadian Amateur, Great Lakes Amateur
- 1948 British Amateur, Canadian Amateur, Mexican Amateur, All-American Amateur
- 1949 Western Amateur, North and South Amateur, All-American Amateur
- 1950 British Amateur, All-American Amateur
- 1951 Mexican Amateur, Western Amateur, All-American Amateur
- 1952 Western Amateur, North and South Amateur, All-American Amateur
- 1953 All-American Amateur

== Professional wins ==
=== PGA Tour wins (6) ===
- 1945 Durham Open (as an amateur)
- 1946 Kansas City Invitational Victory Bond Golf Tournament, Fort Worth Invitational (both as an amateur)
- 1948 Miami Open (as an amateur)
- 1955 Eastern Open
- 1958 Los Angeles Open

=== Other wins ===
this list is incomplete

- 1948 Ohio Open (as an amateur)
- 1960 Ohio Open
- 1961 Ohio Open

== Major championships ==
=== Amateur wins (2) ===
Year	Championship	Winning score	Runner-up
1948	British Amateur	5 & 4	(England) Charlie Stowe
1950	British Amateur	8 & 6	(United States) Dick Chapman

=== Results timeline ===
Amateur

Tournament	1938	1939	1940	1941	1942	1943	1944	1945	1946	1947	1948	1949	1950	1951	1952	1953	1954
Masters Tournament						NT	NT	NT	20 LA	T2 LA		T19	T14 LA	T32	T19	T14 LA	T43
U.S. Open					NT	NT	NT	NT	T45	T13	T41	CUT	T46	T42	CUT	T21	CUT
The Open Championship			NT	NT	NT	NT	NT	NT		T2 LA	T23	13 LA	T9 LA	T12 LA	T37	T2 LA	T29
U.S. Amateur	DNQ			DNQ	NT	NT	NT	NT	R32	R32	QF	R64	2	R256	R32	R128	R16
The Amateur Championship			NT	NT	NT	NT	NT	NT	R16	R16	1	QF	1	R32	2	R64	R16

Professional

Tournament	1955	1956	1957	1958	1959	1960	1961	1962	1963
Masters Tournament	T15	T22	CUT	CUT	T34				
U.S. Open	T12	T34	T13	T10	CUT	T49	T45		CUT
The Open Championship		12	T19				CUT		

Note: Stranahan never played in the PGA Championship.

Win
Top 10
Did not play

LA = low amateur
NT = no tournament
CUT = missed the half-way cut
DNQ = did not qualify for match play portion
R256, R128, R64, R32, R16, QF, SF = Round in which player lost in match play
"T" indicates a tie for a place

Sources: Masters, U.S. Open and U.S. Amateur, The Open Championship, The Amateur Championship: 1946, 1947, 1949, 1951, 1953, 1954.

=== Summary ===
Tournament	Wins	2nd	3rd	Top-5	Top-10	Top-25	Events	Cuts made
Masters Tournament	0	1	0	0	1	8	13	11
U.S. Open	0	0	0	0	1	5	17	12
The Open Championship	0	2	0	2	3	8	11	10
PGA Championship	0	0	0	0	0	0	0	0
Totals	0	3	0	2	5	21	41	33

- Most consecutive cuts made – 8 (twice)
- Longest streak of top-10s – 1 (five times)

== U.S. national team appearances ==
Amateur

- Walker Cup: 1947 (winners), 1949 (winners), 1951 (winners)
- Americas Cup: 1952 (winners)
