= Laurie Ayton Jnr =

Scottish golfer (1914–1989)

Personal information
- Full name: Laurence Buddo Ayton
- Nationality: Scotland
- Born: 1914 Bishop's Stortford, Hertfordshire England
- Died: 21 February 1989 (aged 74) St Andrews, Scotland

Career
- Sport: Golf
- Status: Professional
- Professional wins: 18

Best results in major championships
- Masters Tournament: DNP
- PGA Championship: DNP
- U.S. Open: DNP
- The Open Championship: T15: 1947

Laurence Buddo Ayton Jnr (1914 – 21 February 1989) was a Scottish professional golfer.

== Early life ==
He was the son of golfer Laurie Ayton Snr and was born in Bishop's Stortford where his father was the professional.

== Professional career ==
He was a member of the British team in the 1949 Ryder Cup but did not play in the matches. He played in The Open Championship 21 times with his best finish a tie for 15th in 1947.

Ayton's best results in national tournaments were runner-up finishes in the News of the World Match Play in 1948, the Daily Mail Tournament in 1949, and the Penfold Tournament in 1952. He won more the a dozen regional and county professional and open tournaments in North East England and East Anglia.

== Professional wins (18) ==
- 1936 Durham Union Cup, Victory Cup
- 1937 Durham Union Cup, Victory Cup
- 1938 Northumberland and Durham Professional Championship, Durham Union Cup
- 1947 Sussex Professional Championship, Sussex Open
- 1948 Sussex Professional Championship
- 1950 Sussex Professional Championship
- 1951 Sussex Professional Championship
- 1953 Sussex Open
- 1954 East Anglian Open
- 1955 Suffolk Professional Championship
- 1956 Suffolk Professional Championship
- 1957 Suffolk Professional Championship
- 1958 Suffolk Professional Championship
- 1963 Suffolk Professional Championship

== Results in major championships ==
Tournament	1934	1935	1936	1937	1938	1939
The Open Championship	T42	T55	T31	T37		T26

Tournament	1940	1941	1942	1943	1944	1945	1946	1947	1948	1949
The Open Championship	NT	NT	NT	NT	NT	NT	16	T15	CUT	CUT

Tournament	1950	1951	1952	1953	1954	1955	1956	1957	1958	1959
The Open Championship	CUT			CUT	CUT	CUT	T25	T30	CUT	

Tournament	1960	1961	1962	1963	1964	1965	1966	1967	1968	1969	1970
The Open Championship	T28	CUT			CUT				CUT		CUT

Note: Ayton only played in The Open Championship.

Did not play

NT = No tournament
CUT = missed the half-way cut
"T" indicates a tie for a place

== Team appearances ==
- Ryder Cup (representing Great Britain): 1949
- England–Scotland Professional Match (representing Scotland): 1937
