= List of European Ryder Cup golfers =

This is a complete list of golfers who have played against the United States in the Ryder Cup for the following teams:

- (United Kingdom) Great Britain: 1927 to 1971
- (United Kingdom) Great Britain and (Republic of Ireland) Ireland: 1973 to 1977
- Europe: 1979 to 2025

160 golfers have been in the final teams. In addition the list below includes Miguel Ángel Martín who qualified for the European 1997 Ryder Cup team but withdrew due to injury. Seven of the golfers in the final teams were never chosen to play in any matches so that only 152 of these golfers have actually played in the Ryder Cup.

In 1973 the official title of the British Team had been changed from "Great Britain" to "Great Britain and Ireland", but this was simply a change of name to reflect the fact that golfers from the Republic of Ireland had been playing in the Great Britain Ryder Cup team since 1953, while Northern Irish players had competed since 1947. In addition, two golfers from Jersey and one from Guernsey (both British Crown Dependencies) played on the Great Britain team in the 1920s.

== Players ==
Player	Country	Editions
Ludvig Åberg	Sweden	2023, 2025
Jimmy Adams	Scotland	1947, 1949, 1951, 1953
Percy Alliss	England	1929, (Note: In the final team, but did not play any matches.) 1933, 1935, 1937
Peter Alliss	England	1953, 1957, 1959, 1961, 1963, 1965, 1967, 1969
Laurie Ayton Jnr	Scotland	1949
Peter Baker	England	1993
Seve Ballesteros	Spain	1979, 1983, 1985, 1987, 1989, 1991, 1993, 1995
Harry Bannerman	Scotland	1971
Brian Barnes	Scotland	1969, 1971, 1973, 1975, 1977, 1979
Maurice Bembridge	England	1969, 1971, 1973, 1975
Thomas Bjørn	Denmark	1997, 2002, 2014
Aubrey Boomer	Jersey	1927, 1929
Ken Bousfield	England	1949, 1951, 1955, 1957, 1959, 1961
Hugh Boyle	Ireland	1967
Harry Bradshaw	Ireland	1953, 1955, 1957
Gordon Brand Jnr	Scotland	1987, 1989
Gordon J. Brand	England	1983
Paul Broadhurst	England	1991
Eric Brown	Scotland	1953, 1955, 1957, 1959
Ken Brown	Scotland	1977, 1979, 1983, 1985, 1987
Stewart Burns	Scotland	1929
Dick Burton	England	1935, 1937, 1949
Jack Busson	England	1935
Peter Butler	England	1965, 1969, 1971, 1973
Rafa Cabrera-Bello	Spain	2016
José María Cañizares	Spain	1981, 1983, 1985, 1989
Paul Casey	England	2004, 2006, 2008, 2018, 2021
Alex Caygill	England	1969
Clive Clark	England	1973
Howard Clark	England	1977, 1981, 1985, 1987, 1989, 1995
Darren Clarke	Northern Ireland	1997, 1999, 2002, 2004, 2006
Neil Coles	England	1961, 1963, 1965, 1967, 1969, 1971, 1973, 1977
Nicolas Colsaerts	Belgium	2012
Andrew Coltart	Scotland	1999
Archie Compston	England	1927, 1929, 1931
Henry Cotton	England	1929, 1937, 1947
Bill Cox	England	1935, 1937
Allan Dailey	Scotland	1933
Fred Daly	Northern Ireland	1947, 1949, 1951, 1953
Eamonn Darcy	Ireland	1975, 1977, 1981, 1987
Bill Davies	England	1931, 1933
Peter Dawson	England	1977
Luke Donald	England	2004, 2006, 2010, 2012
Jamie Donaldson	Wales	2014
Norman Drew	Northern Ireland	1959
Victor Dubuisson	France	2014
George Duncan	Scotland	1927, 1929, 1931
Syd Easterbrook	England	1931, 1933
Nick Faldo	England	1977, 1979, 1981, 1983, 1985, 1987, 1989, 1991, 1993, 1995, 1997
John Fallon	Scotland	1955
Niclas Fasth	Sweden	2002
Max Faulkner	England	1947, 1949, 1951, 1953, 1957
David Feherty	Northern Ireland	1991
Ross Fisher	England	2010
Matt Fitzpatrick	England	2016, 2021, 2023, 2025
Tommy Fleetwood	England	2018, 2021, 2023, 2025
Pierre Fulke	Sweden	2002
George Gadd	England	1927
Bernard Gallacher	Scotland	1969, 1971, 1973, 1975, 1977, 1979, 1981, 1983
Stephen Gallacher	Scotland	2014
Sergio García	Spain	1999, 2002, 2004, 2006, 2008, 2012, 2014, 2016, 2018, 2021
John Garner	England	1971, 1973
Antonio Garrido	Spain	1979
Ignacio Garrido	Spain	1997
David Gilford	England	1991, 1995
Eric Green	England	1947
Malcolm Gregson	England	1967
Joakim Haeggman	Sweden	1993
Tom Haliburton	Scotland	1961, 1963
Søren Hansen	Denmark	2008
Peter Hanson	Sweden	2010, 2012
Jack Hargreaves	England	1951
Pádraig Harrington	Ireland	1999, 2002, 2004, 2006, 2008, 2010
Tyrrell Hatton	England	2018, 2021, 2023, 2025
Arthur Havers	England	1927, 1931, 1933
Jimmy Hitchcock	England	1965
Bert Hodson	Wales	1931
Nicolai Højgaard	Denmark	2023
Rasmus Højgaard	Denmark	2025
Reg Horne	England	1947
Tommy Horton	England	1975, 1977
Viktor Hovland	Norway	2021, 2023, 2025
David Howell	England	2004, 2006
Brian Huggett	Wales	1963, 1967, 1969, 1971, 1973, 1975
Bernard Hunt	England	1953, 1957, 1959, 1961, 1963, 1965, 1967, 1969
Geoffrey Hunt	England	1963
Guy Hunt	England	1975
Tony Jacklin	England	1967, 1969, 1971, 1973, 1975, 1977, 1979
John Jacobs	England	1955
Mark James	England	1977, 1979, 1981, 1989, 1991, 1993, 1995
Ted Jarman	England	1935
Miguel Ángel Jiménez	Spain	1999, 2004, 2008, 2010
Per-Ulrik Johansson	Sweden	1995, 1997
Herbert Jolly	Guernsey	1927, 1931 (Note: Selected or qualified for the team but withdrew and was replaced. Abe Mitchell (in 1927) was ill and was replaced by Herbert Jolly; Herbert Jolly (in 1931) withdrew due to lack of form and was replaced by Arthur Havers; José María Olazábal (in 1995) withdrew due to injury and was replaced by Ian Woosnam; and Miguel Ángel Martín (in 1997) withdrew due to injury and was replaced by José María Olazábal.)
Robert Karlsson	Sweden	2006, 2008
Martin Kaymer	Germany	2010, 2012, 2014, 2016
Michael King	England	1979
Sam King	England	1937, 1947, 1949
Arthur Lacey	England	1933, 1937
Barry Lane	England	1993
Bernhard Langer	Germany	1981, 1983, 1985, 1987, 1989, 1991, 1993, 1995, 1997, 2002
Paul Lawrie	Scotland	1999, 2012
Arthur Lees	England	1947, 1949, 1951, 1955
Thomas Levet	France	2004
Shane Lowry	Ireland	2021, 2023, 2025
Sandy Lyle	Scotland	1979, 1981, 1983, 1985, 1987
Robert MacIntyre	Scotland	2023, 2025
Miguel Ángel Martín	Spain	1997
Jimmy Martin	Ireland	1965
Graeme McDowell	Northern Ireland	2008, 2010, 2012, 2014
Paul McGinley	Ireland	2002, 2004, 2006
Rory McIlroy	Northern Ireland	2010, 2012, 2014, 2016, 2018, 2021, 2023, 2025
Peter Mills	England	1957, 1959
Abe Mitchell	England	1927, 1929, 1931, 1933
Ralph Moffitt	England	1961
Edoardo Molinari	Italy	2010
Francesco Molinari	Italy	2010, 2012, 2018
Colin Montgomerie	Scotland	1991, 1993, 1995, 1997, 1999, 2002, 2004, 2006
Alex Norén	Sweden	2018
Christy O'Connor Jnr	Ireland	1975, 1989
Christy O'Connor Snr	Ireland	1955, 1957, 1959, 1961, 1963, 1965, 1967, 1969, 1971, 1973
John O'Leary	Ireland	1975
José María Olazábal	Spain	1987, 1989, 1991, 1993, 1995, 1997, 1999, 2006
Thorbjørn Olesen	Denmark	2018
Peter Oosterhuis	England	1971, 1973, 1975, 1977, 1979, 1981
Alf Padgham	England	1933, 1935, 1937
John Panton	Scotland	1951, 1953, 1961
Jesper Parnevik	Sweden	1997, 1999, 2002
Alf Perry	England	1933, 1935, 1937
Thomas Pieters	Belgium	2016
Manuel Piñero	Spain	1981, 1985
Lionel Platts	England	1965
Eddie Polland	Northern Ireland	1973
Ian Poulter	England	2004, 2008, 2010, 2012, 2014, 2018, 2021
Phillip Price	Wales	2002
Ronan Rafferty	Northern Ireland	1989
Jon Rahm	Spain	2018, 2021, 2023, 2025
Ted Ray	Jersey	1927
Dai Rees	Wales	1937, 1947, 1949, 1951, 1953, 1955, 1957, 1959, 1961
Steven Richardson	England	1991
José Rivero	Spain	1985, 1987
Fred Robson	England	1927, 1929, 1931
Costantino Rocca	Italy	1993, 1995, 1997
Justin Rose	England	2008, 2012, 2014, 2016, 2018, 2023, 2025
Jarmo Sandelin	Sweden	1999
Syd Scott	England	1955
Des Smyth	Ireland	1979, 1981
Henrik Stenson	Sweden	2006, 2008, 2014, 2016, 2018
Sepp Straka	Austria	2023, 2025
Andy Sullivan	England	2016
Dave Thomas	Wales	1959, 1963, 1965, 1967
Sam Torrance	Scotland	1981, 1983, 1985, 1987, 1989, 1991, 1993, 1995
Peter Townsend	England	1969, 1971
Jean van de Velde	France	1999
Brian Waites	England	1983
Philip Walton	Ireland	1995
Charlie Ward	England	1947, 1949, 1951
Paul Way	England	1983, 1985
Harry Weetman	England	1951, 1953, 1955, 1957, 1959, 1961, 1963
Lee Westwood	England	1997, 1999, 2002, 2004, 2006, 2008, 2010, 2012, 2014, 2016, 2021
Charles Whitcombe	England	1927, 1929, 1931, 1933, 1935, 1937
Ernest Whitcombe	England	1929, 1931, 1935
Reg Whitcombe	England	1935
Bernd Wiesberger	Austria	2021
George Will	Scotland	1963, 1965, 1967
Danny Willett	England	2016
Oliver Wilson	England	2008
Chris Wood	England	2016
Norman Wood	Scotland	1975
Ian Woosnam	Wales	1983, 1985, 1987, 1989, 1991, 1993, 1995, 1997

== Playing record ==
W = Matches won, L = Matches lost, H = Matches halved

Cty	Player	First year	Last year	Ryder Cups	Matches	Points	Points percentage	Overall			Singles			Foursomes			Fourballs		
Cty	Player	First year	Last year	Ryder Cups	Matches	Points	Points percentage	W	L	H	W	L	H	W	L	H	W	L	H
(Sweden)	Ludvig Åberg	2023	2025	2	8	4	50.00%	4	4	0	1	1	0	3	1	0	0	2	0
(Scotland)	Jimmy Adams	1947	1953	4	7	2	28.57%	2	5	0	1	2	0	1	3	0	0	0	0
(England)	Percy Alliss	1929	1937	4	6	3.5	58.33%	3	2	1	2	1	0	1	1	1	0	0	0
(England)	Peter Alliss	1953	1969	8	30	12.5	41.67%	10	15	5	5	4	3	4	6	1	1	5	1
(Scotland)	Laurie Ayton Jnr	1949	1949	1	0														
(England)	Peter Baker	1993	1993	1	4	3	75.00%	3	1	0	1	0	0	0	1	0	2	0	0
(Spain)	Seve Ballesteros	1979	1995	8	37	22.5	60.81%	20	12	5	2	4	2	10	3	1	8	5	2
(Scotland)	Harry Bannerman	1971	1971	1	5	2.5	50.00%	2	2	1	1	0	1	1	0	0	0	2	0
(Scotland)	Brian Barnes	1969	1979	6	25	10.5	42.00%	10	14	1	5	5	0	2	4	0	3	5	1
(England)	Maurice Bembridge	1969	1975	4	16	6.5	40.63%	5	8	3	1	3	1	3	5	0	1	0	2
(Denmark)	Thomas Bjørn	1997	2014	3	9	4	44.44%	3	4	2	1	1	1	0	2	0	2	1	1
(Jersey)	Aubrey Boomer	1927	1929	2	4	2	50.00%	2	2	0	1	1	0	1	1	0	0	0	0
(England)	Ken Bousfield	1949	1961	6	10	5	50.00%	5	5	0	2	2	0	3	3	0	0	0	0
(Republic of Ireland)	Hugh Boyle	1967	1967	1	3	0	0.00%	0	3	0	0	1	0	0	1	0	0	1	0
(Republic of Ireland)	Harry Bradshaw	1953	1957	3	5	2.5	50.00%	2	2	1	1	1	1	1	1	0	0	0	0
(England)	Gordon J. Brand	1983	1983	1	1	0	0.00%	0	1	0	0	1	0	0	0	0	0	0	0
(Scotland)	Gordon Brand Jnr	1987	1989	2	7	2.5	35.71%	2	4	1	0	1	1	0	2	0	2	1	0
(England)	Paul Broadhurst	1991	1991	1	2	2	100.00%	2	0	0	1	0	0	0	0	0	1	0	0
(Scotland)	Eric Brown	1953	1959	4	8	4	50.00%	4	4	0	4	0	0	0	4	0	0	0	0
(Scotland)	Ken Brown	1977	1987	5	13	4	30.77%	4	9	0	2	2	0	1	4	0	1	3	0
(Scotland)	Stewart Burns	1929	1929	1	0														
(England)	Dick Burton	1935	1949	3	5	2	40.00%	2	3	0	0	3	0	2	0	0	0	0	0
(England)	Jack Busson	1935	1935	1	2	0	0.00%	0	2	0	0	1	0	0	1	0	0	0	0
(England)	Peter Butler	1965	1973	4	14	4	28.57%	3	9	2	2	3	0	1	4	0	0	2	2
(Spain)	Rafa Cabrera-Bello	2016	2016	1	3	2.5	83.33%	2	0	1	1	0	0	0	0	1	1	0	0
(Spain)	José María Cañizares	1981	1989	4	11	6	54.55%	5	4	2	2	1	1	2	1	0	1	2	1
(England)	Paul Casey	2004	2021	5	16	6.5	40.63%	4	7	5	1	2	2	1	3	0	2	2	3
(England)	Alex Caygill	1969	1969	1	1	0.5	50.00%	0	0	1	0	0	0	0	0	0	0	0	1
(England)	Clive Clark	1973	1973	1	1	0	0.00%	0	1	0	0	0	0	0	0	0	0	1	0
(England)	Howard Clark	1977	1995	6	15	7.5	50.00%	7	7	1	4	2	0	0	4	0	3	1	1
(Northern Ireland)	Darren Clarke	1997	2006	5	20	11.5	57.50%	10	7	3	1	2	2	3	3	0	6	2	1
(England)	Neil Coles	1961	1977	8	40	15.5	38.75%	12	21	7	5	6	4	4	8	1	3	7	2
(Belgium)	Nicolas Colsaerts	2012	2012	1	4	1	25.00%	1	3	0	0	1	0	0	1	0	1	1	0
(Scotland)	Andrew Coltart	1999	1999	1	1	0	0.00%	0	1	0	0	1	0	0	0	0	0	0	0
(England)	Archie Compston	1927	1931	3	6	1.5	25.00%	1	4	1	1	2	0	0	2	1	0	0	0
(England)	Henry Cotton	1929	1947	3	6	2	33.33%	2	4	0	2	1	0	0	3	0	0	0	0
(England)	Bill Cox	1935	1937	2	3	0.5	16.67%	0	2	1	0	0	1	0	2	0	0	0	0
(Scotland)	Allan Dailey	1933	1933	1	0														
(Northern Ireland)	Fred Daly	1947	1953	4	8	3.5	43.75%	3	4	1	1	2	1	2	2	0	0	0	0
(Republic of Ireland)	Eamonn Darcy	1975	1987	4	11	2	18.18%	1	8	2	1	3	0	0	1	1	0	4	1
(England)	Bill Davies	1931	1933	2	4	2	50.00%	2	2	0	1	1	0	1	1	0	0	0	0
(England)	Peter Dawson	1977	1977	1	3	1	33.33%	1	2	0	1	0	0	0	1	0	0	1	0
(England)	Luke Donald	2004	2012	4	15	10.5	70.00%	10	4	1	3	1	0	6	2	0	1	1	1
(Wales)	Jamie Donaldson	2014	2014	1	4	3	75.00%	3	1	0	1	0	0	2	0	0	0	1	0
(Northern Ireland)	Norman Drew	1959	1959	1	1	0.5	50.00%	0	0	1	0	0	1	0	0	0	0	0	0
(France)	Victor Dubuisson	2014	2014	1	3	2.5	83.33%	2	0	1	0	0	1	2	0	0	0	0	0
(Scotland)	George Duncan	1927	1931	3	5	2	40.00%	2	3	0	2	0	0	0	3	0	0	0	0
(England)	Syd Easterbrook	1931	1933	2	3	2	66.67%	2	1	0	1	0	0	1	1	0	0	0	0
(England)	Nick Faldo	1977	1997	11	46	25	54.35%	23	19	4	6	4	1	10	6	2	7	9	1
(Scotland)	John Fallon	1955	1955	1	1	1	100.00%	1	0	0	0	0	0	1	0	0	0	0	0
(Sweden)	Niclas Fasth	2002	2002	1	3	0.5	16.67%	0	2	1	0	0	1	0	0	0	0	2	0
(England)	Max Faulkner	1947	1957	5	8	1	12.50%	1	7	0	0	4	0	1	3	0	0	0	0
(Northern Ireland)	David Feherty	1991	1991	1	3	1.5	50.00%	1	1	1	1	0	0	0	1	0	0	0	1
(England)	Ross Fisher	2010	2010	1	4	2	50.00%	2	2	0	0	1	0	1	0	0	1	1	0
(England)	Matt Fitzpatrick	2016	2025	4	12	3.5	29.17%	3	8	1	0	3	1	1	4	0	2	1	0
(England)	Tommy Fleetwood	2018	2025	4	17	12	70.59%	11	4	2	1	2	1	6	0	0	4	2	1
(Sweden)	Pierre Fulke	2002	2002	1	2	0.5	25.00%	0	1	1	0	0	1	0	1	0	0	0	0
(England)	George Gadd	1927	1927	1	0														
(Scotland)	Bernard Gallacher	1969	1983	8	31	15.5	50.00%	13	13	5	4	3	4	5	6	0	4	4	1
(Scotland)	Stephen Gallacher	2014	2014	1	2	0	0.00%	0	2	0	0	1	0	0	0	0	0	1	0
(Spain)	Sergio García	1999	2021	10	45	28.5	63.33%	25	13	7	4	5	1	12	4	3	9	4	3
(England)	John Garner	1971	1973	2	1	0	0.00%	0	1	0	0	0	0	0	0	0	0	1	0
(Spain)	Antonio Garrido	1979	1979	1	5	1	20.00%	1	4	0	0	1	0	1	1	0	0	2	0
(Spain)	Ignacio Garrido	1997	1997	1	4	1.5	37.50%	0	1	3	0	1	0	0	0	2	0	0	1
(England)	David Gilford	1991	1995	2	7	3.5	50.00%	3	3	1	1	0	1	1	2	0	1	1	0
(England)	Eric Green	1947	1947	1	0														
(England)	Malcolm Gregson	1967	1967	1	4	0	0.00%	0	4	0	0	2	0	0	1	0	0	1	0
(Sweden)	Joakim Haeggman	1993	1993	1	2	1	50.00%	1	1	0	1	0	0	0	0	0	0	1	0
(Scotland)	Tom Haliburton	1961	1963	2	6	0	0.00%	0	6	0	0	2	0	0	3	0	0	1	0
(Denmark)	Søren Hansen	2008	2008	1	3	0.5	16.67%	0	2	1	0	1	0	0	0	0	0	1	1
(Sweden)	Peter Hanson	2010	2012	2	5	1	20.00%	1	4	0	0	2	0	0	1	0	1	1	0
(England)	Jack Hargreaves	1951	1951	1	0														
(Republic of Ireland)	Pádraig Harrington	1999	2010	6	25	10.5	42.00%	9	13	3	3	3	0	3	4	3	3	6	0
(England)	Tyrrell Hatton	2018	2025	4	15	9.5	63.33%	8	4	3	1	2	1	4	1	0	3	1	2
(England)	Arthur Havers	1927	1933	3	6	3	50.00%	3	3	0	2	1	0	1	2	0	0	0	0
(England)	Jimmy Hitchcock	1965	1965	1	3	0	0.00%	0	3	0	0	2	0	0	1	0	0	0	0
(Wales)	Bert Hodson	1931	1931	1	1	0	0.00%	0	1	0	0	1	0	0	0	0	0	0	0
(Denmark)	Nicolai Højgaard	2023	2023	1	3	0.5	16.67%	0	2	1	0	1	0	0	0	0	0	1	1
(Denmark)	Rasmus Højgaard	2025	2025	1	2	0	0.00%	0	2	0	0	1	0	0	0	0	0	1	0
(England)	Reg Horne	1947	1947	1	0														
(England)	Tommy Horton	1975	1977	2	8	1.5	18.75%	1	6	1	1	1	1	0	2	0	0	3	0
(Norway)	Viktor Hovland	2021	2025	3	13	6	46.15%	4	5	4	1	0	2	3	3	0	0	2	2
(England)	David Howell	2004	2006	2	5	3.5	70.00%	3	1	1	1	1	0	1	0	1	1	0	0
(Wales)	Brian Huggett	1963	1975	6	25	12	48.00%	9	10	6	3	3	1	5	3	2	1	4	3
(England)	Bernard Hunt	1953	1969	8	28	9	32.14%	6	16	6	4	3	3	1	9	1	1	4	2
(England)	Geoffrey Hunt	1963	1963	1	3	0	0.00%	0	3	0	0	1	0	0	1	0	0	1	0
(England)	Guy Hunt	1975	1975	1	3	0.5	16.67%	0	2	1	0	1	0	0	1	0	0	0	1
(England)	Tony Jacklin	1967	1979	7	35	17	48.57%	13	14	8	2	8	1	8	1	4	3	5	3
(England)	John Jacobs	1955	1955	1	2	2	100.00%	2	0	0	1	0	0	1	0	0	0	0	0
(England)	Mark James	1977	1995	7	24	8.5	35.42%	8	15	1	2	4	1	1	7	0	5	4	0
(England)	Ted Jarman	1935	1935	1	1	0	0.00%	0	1	0	0	0	0	0	1	0	0	0	0
(Spain)	Miguel Ángel Jiménez	1999	2010	4	15	5.5	36.67%	4	8	3	1	3	0	0	4	2	3	1	1
(Sweden)	Per-Ulrik Johansson	1995	1997	2	5	3	60.00%	3	2	0	1	1	0	1	0	0	1	1	0
Guernsey	Herbert Jolly	1927	1927	1	2	0	0.00%	0	2	0	0	1	0	0	1	0	0	0	0
(Sweden)	Robert Karlsson	2006	2008	2	7	3	42.86%	1	2	4	1	1	0	0	1	1	0	0	3
(Germany)	Martin Kaymer	2010	2016	4	14	6.5	46.43%	5	6	3	3	1	0	0	1	2	2	4	1
(England)	Michael King	1979	1979	1	1	0	0.00%	0	1	0	0	1	0	0	0	0	0	0	0
(England)	Sam King	1937	1949	3	5	1.5	30.00%	1	3	1	1	1	1	0	2	0	0	0	0
(England)	Arthur Lacey	1933	1937	2	3	0	0.00%	0	3	0	0	2	0	0	1	0	0	0	0
(England)	Barry Lane	1993	1993	1	3	0	0.00%	0	3	0	0	1	0	0	1	0	0	1	0
(Germany)	Bernhard Langer	1981	2002	10	42	24	57.14%	21	15	6	4	3	3	11	6	1	6	6	2
(Scotland)	Paul Lawrie	1999	2012	2	8	4.5	56.25%	4	3	1	2	0	0	1	1	0	1	2	1
(England)	Arthur Lees	1947	1955	4	8	4	50.00%	4	4	0	2	2	0	2	2	0	0	0	0
(France)	Thomas Levet	2004	2004	1	3	1	33.33%	1	2	0	1	0	0	0	2	0	0	0	0
(Republic of Ireland)	Shane Lowry	2021	2025	3	9	4.5	50.00%	3	3	3	0	1	2	1	1	0	2	1	1
(Scotland)	Sandy Lyle	1979	1987	5	18	8	44.44%	7	9	2	1	4	0	3	3	1	3	2	1
(Northern Ireland)	Graeme McDowell	2008	2014	4	15	9	60.00%	8	5	2	3	1	0	4	2	1	1	2	1
(Republic of Ireland)	Paul McGinley	2002	2006	3	9	4.5	50.00%	2	2	5	1	0	2	1	2	1	0	0	2
(Northern Ireland)	Rory McIlroy	2010	2025	8	38	21.5	56.58%	19	14	5	4	3	1	9	5	1	6	6	3
(Scotland)	Robert MacIntyre	2023	2025	2	6	4	66.67%	3	1	2	1	0	1	1	1	0	1	0	1
(Republic of Ireland)	Jimmy Martin	1965	1965	1	1	0	0.00%	0	1	0	0	0	0	0	1	0	0	0	0
(England)	Peter Mills	1957	1959	2	1	1	100.00%	1	0	0	1	0	0	0	0	0	0	0	0
(England)	Abe Mitchell	1929	1933	3	6	4	66.67%	4	2	0	1	2	0	3	0	0	0	0	0
(England)	Ralph Moffitt	1961	1961	1	1	0	0.00%	0	1	0	0	1	0	0	0	0	0	0	0
(Italy)	Edoardo Molinari	2010	2010	1	3	1	33.33%	0	1	2	0	0	1	0	1	0	0	0	1
(Italy)	Francesco Molinari	2010	2018	3	11	6	54.55%	5	4	2	1	1	1	2	2	0	2	1	1
(Scotland)	Colin Montgomerie	1991	2006	8	36	23.5	65.28%	20	9	7	6	0	2	8	3	3	6	6	2
(Sweden)	Alex Norén	2018	2018	1	3	2	66.67%	2	1	0	1	0	0	1	1	0	0	0	0
(Republic of Ireland)	Christy O'Connor Snr	1955	1973	10	36	13	36.11%	11	21	4	2	10	2	6	6	1	3	5	1
(Republic of Ireland)	Christy O'Connor Jnr	1975	1989	2	4	1	25.00%	1	3	0	1	0	0	0	2	0	0	1	0
(Spain)	José María Olazábal	1987	2006	7	31	20.5	66.13%	18	8	5	2	4	1	7	2	1	9	2	3
(Republic of Ireland)	John O'Leary	1975	1975	1	4	0	0.00%	0	4	0	0	1	0	0	2	0	0	1	0
(Denmark)	Thorbjørn Olesen	2018	2018	1	2	1	50.00%	1	1	0	1	0	0	0	0	0	0	1	0
(England)	Peter Oosterhuis	1971	1981	6	28	15.5	55.36%	14	11	3	6	2	1	3	6	1	5	3	1
(England)	Alf Padgham	1933	1937	3	6	0	0.00%	0	6	0	0	3	0	0	3	0	0	0	0
(Scotland)	John Panton	1951	1961	3	5	0	0.00%	0	5	0	0	1	0	0	4	0	0	0	0
(Sweden)	Jesper Parnevik	1997	2002	3	11	6	54.55%	4	3	4	0	2	1	2	0	2	2	1	1
(England)	Alf Perry	1933	1937	3	4	0.5	12.50%	0	3	1	0	1	1	0	2	0	0	0	0
(Belgium)	Thomas Pieters	2016	2016	1	5	4	80.00%	4	1	0	1	0	0	1	1	0	2	0	0
(Spain)	Manuel Piñero	1981	1985	2	9	6	66.67%	6	3	0	2	0	0	2	2	0	2	1	0
(England)	Lionel Platts	1965	1965	1	5	2	40.00%	1	2	2	1	1	0	0	1	0	0	0	2
(Northern Ireland)	Eddie Polland	1973	1973	1	2	0	0.00%	0	2	0	0	0	0	0	1	0	0	1	0
(England)	Ian Poulter	2004	2021	7	25	16	64.00%	15	8	2	6	0	1	5	3	0	4	5	1
(Wales)	Phillip Price	2002	2002	1	2	1	50.00%	1	1	0	1	0	0	0	1	0	0	0	0
(Northern Ireland)	Ronan Rafferty	1989	1989	1	3	1	33.33%	1	2	0	1	0	0	0	2	0	0	0	0
(Spain)	Jon Rahm	2018	2025	4	17	10.5	61.76%	9	5	3	1	2	1	6	0	0	2	3	2
(Jersey)	Ted Ray	1927	1927	1	2	0	0.00%	0	2	0	0	1	0	0	1	0	0	0	0
(Wales)	Dai Rees	1937	1961	9	18	7.5	41.67%	7	10	1	5	5	0	2	5	1	0	0	0
(England)	Steven Richardson	1991	1991	1	4	2	50.00%	2	2	0	0	1	0	0	1	0	2	0	0
(Spain)	José Rivero	1985	1987	2	5	2	40.00%	2	3	0	0	2	0	1	1	0	1	0	0
(England)	Fred Robson	1927	1931	3	6	2	33.33%	2	4	0	0	3	0	2	1	0	0	0	0
(Italy)	Costantino Rocca	1993	1997	3	11	6	54.55%	6	5	0	1	2	0	3	1	0	2	2	0
(England)	Justin Rose	2008	2025	7	29	17.5	60.34%	16	10	3	2	4	1	7	2	1	7	4	1
(Sweden)	Jarmo Sandelin	1999	1999	1	1	0	0.00%	0	1	0	0	1	0	0	0	0	0	0	0
(England)	Syd Scott	1955	1955	1	2	0	0.00%	0	2	0	0	1	0	0	1	0	0	0	0
(Republic of Ireland)	Des Smyth	1979	1981	2	7	2	28.57%	2	5	0	0	2	0	1	2	0	1	1	0
(Sweden)	Henrik Stenson	2006	2018	5	19	11	57.89%	10	7	2	3	2	0	4	3	1	3	2	1
(Austria)	Sepp Straka	2023	2025	2	6	2	33.33%	2	4	0	0	2	0	1	1	0	1	1	0
(England)	Andy Sullivan	2016	2016	1	2	0	0.00%	0	2	0	0	1	0	0	1	0	0	0	0
(Wales)	Dave Thomas	1959	1967	4	18	5.5	30.56%	3	10	5	0	4	1	3	2	2	0	4	2
(Scotland)	Sam Torrance	1981	1995	8	28	10	35.71%	7	15	6	2	3	3	3	7	0	2	5	3
(England)	Peter Townsend	1969	1971	2	11	3	27.27%	3	8	0	0	3	0	2	2	0	1	3	0
(France)	Jean van de Velde	1999	1999	1	1	0	0.00%	0	1	0	0	1	0	0	0	0	0	0	0
(England)	Brian Waites	1983	1983	1	4	1	25.00%	1	3	0	0	1	0	0	1	0	1	1	0
(Republic of Ireland)	Philip Walton	1995	1995	1	2	1	50.00%	1	1	0	1	0	0	0	1	0	0	0	0
(England)	Charlie Ward	1947	1951	3	6	1	16.67%	1	5	0	0	3	0	1	2	0	0	0	0
(England)	Paul Way	1983	1985	2	9	6.5	72.22%	6	2	1	2	0	0	1	2	0	3	0	1
(England)	Harry Weetman	1951	1963	7	15	3	20.00%	2	11	2	2	6	0	0	4	2	0	1	0
(England)	Lee Westwood	1997	2021	11	47	24	51.06%	21	20	6	4	7	0	9	7	4	8	6	2
(England)	Charles Whitcombe	1927	1937	6	9	5	55.56%	3	2	4	1	2	1	2	0	3	0	0	0
(England)	Ernest Whitcombe	1929	1935	3	6	1.5	25.00%	1	4	1	0	2	1	1	2	0	0	0	0
(England)	Reg Whitcombe	1935	1935	1	1	0	0.00%	0	1	0	0	1	0	0	0	0	0	0	0
(Austria)	Bernd Wiesberger	2021	2021	1	3	0	0.00%	0	3	0	0	1	0	0	1	0	0	1	0
(Scotland)	George Will	1963	1967	3	15	3	20.00%	2	11	2	0	3	1	2	3	1	0	5	0
(England)	Danny Willett	2016	2016	1	3	0	0.00%	0	3	0	0	1	0	0	0	0	0	2	0
(England)	Oliver Wilson	2008	2008	1	2	1	50.00%	1	1	0	0	1	0	1	0	0	0	0	0
(England)	Chris Wood	2016	2016	1	2	1	50.00%	1	1	0	0	1	0	1	0	0	0	0	0
(Scotland)	Norman Wood	1975	1975	1	3	1	33.33%	1	2	0	1	0	0	0	1	0	0	1	0
(Wales)	Ian Woosnam	1983	1997	8	31	16.5	53.23%	14	12	5	0	6	2	4	3	2	10	3	1

In this table the appearances includes players who were in the final team but were not selected for any matches. It does not include those who were initially selected or who qualified but were later replaced. Thus Mitchell (1927), Jolly (1931), Olazábal (1995) and Martín (1997) are excluded.

== Record European point winners ==
Rank	Name	Record (W–L–H)	Points	Points percentage
1	(Spain) Sergio García	25–13–7	28.5	63.33%
2	(England) Nick Faldo	23–19–4	25	54.35%
3	(Germany) Bernhard Langer	21–15–6	24	57.14%
	(England) Lee Westwood	21–20–6	24	51.06%
5	(Scotland) Colin Montgomerie	20–9–7	23.5	65.28%
6	(Spain) Seve Ballesteros	20–12–5	22.5	60.81%
7	(Northern Ireland) Rory McIlroy	19–14–5	21.5	56.58%
8	(Spain) José María Olazábal	18–8–5	20.5	66.13%
9	(England) Justin Rose	16–10–3	17.5	60.34%
10	(England) Tony Jacklin	13–14–8	17	48.57%

== European country records ==
Country	Appearances	Events	Players	Year range	Most capped player
England	88	23	28	1979–2025	Lee Westwood (11)
Spain	44	22	11	1979–2025	Sergio García (10)
Scotland	37	18	11	1979–2025	Sam Torrance (8); Colin Montgomerie (8)
Sweden	20	14	11	1993–2025	Henrik Stenson (5)
Northern Ireland	19	16	5	1989–2025	Rory McIlroy (8)
Ireland	18	14	7	1979–2025	Pádraig Harrington (6)
Germany	14	14	2	1981–2016	Bernhard Langer (10)
Wales	10	10	3	1983–2014	Ian Woosnam (8)
Italy	7	6	3	1993–2018	Costantino Rocca (3); Francesco Molinari (3)
Denmark	7	7	5	1997–2025	Thomas Bjørn (3)
Austria	3	3	2	2021–2025	Sepp Straka (2)
France	3	3	3	1999–2014	Jean van de Velde (1); Thomas Levet (1); Victor Dubuisson (1)
Norway	3	3	1	2021–2025	Viktor Hovland (3)
Belgium	2	2	2	2012–2016	Nicolas Colsaerts (1); Thomas Pieters (1)

This table excludes José María Olazábal (in 1995) and Miguel Ángel Martín (in 1997) who withdrew due to injury and were replaced in the team. Martín never played in a Ryder Cup team. Nick Faldo played in 11 Ryder Cups but made his debut in 1977 for Great Britain and Ireland.

In the 23 contests from 1979 to 2025 there have been 172 appearances by players from Great Britain and Ireland (an average of 7.5) and 104 by those from Continental Europe (an average of 4.5).

== Family relationships ==
The following European Ryder Cup players are or have been related:

- Peter Alliss was the son of Percy Alliss.
- Ignacio Garrido is the son of Antonio Garrido.
- Ernest Whitcombe, Charles Whitcombe and Reg Whitcombe were brothers. All three played together in the 1935 Ryder Cup.
- Bernard Hunt and Geoffrey Hunt were brothers. They played together in the 1963 Ryder Cup.
- Edoardo Molinari and Francesco Molinari are brothers. They played together in the 2010 Ryder Cup.
- Nicolai Højgaard and Rasmus Højgaard are twin brothers.
- Christy O'Connor Snr was the uncle of Christy O'Connor Jnr.
- Bernard Gallacher is the uncle of Stephen Gallacher.
- Brian Barnes was the son-in-law of Max Faulkner. Barnes was married to Faulkner's daughter Hilary.
- Lee Westwood was the brother-in-law of Andrew Coltart. Westwood was married to Coltart's sister Laurae. They played together in the 1999 Ryder Cup.
- Per-Ulrik Johansson is the brother-in-law of Jesper Parnevik. Johansson is married to Parnevik's sister Jill. They played together in the 1997 Ryder Cup, although Per-Ulrik Johansson did not marry Jill Parnevik until 2002.

== See also ==
- List of American Ryder Cup golfers
- Lists of golfers
