= List of Ryder Cup records =

The Ryder Cup is a biennial men's golf competition between teams from Europe and the United States. Originally contested between Great Britain and the United States, the first official Ryder Cup took place in 1927. The representation of "Great Britain and Ireland" was extended to include continental Europe from 1979.

In all the following tables Europe includes Great Britain/Great Britain and Ireland up to 1977.

For details of individual players' complete Ryder Cup records see: List of European Ryder Cup golfers and List of American Ryder Cup golfers.

== Summary ==
There have been a total of 1068 individual matches played in the 45 Ryder Cups. Of these the United States has won 511, Europe (including Great Britain/Great Britain and Ireland up to 1977) has won 408 with 149 matches halved. Thus the United States have scored a total of 585½ points to Europe's 482½.

Team	All Ryder Cups				36 hole matches			18 hole matches			
Team	Overall	Singles	Foursomes	Fourballs	Overall	Singles	Foursomes	Overall	Singles	Foursomes	Fourballs
United States won	511	257	147	107	94	61	33	417	196	114	107
Europe won	408	185	128	95	48	33	15	360	152	113	95
Halved	149	76	30	43	14	10	4	135	66	26	43
United States points	585½	295	162	128½	101	66	35	484½	229	127	128½
Europe points	482½	223	143	116½	55	38	17	427½	185	126	116½
Total	1068	518	305	245	156	104	52	912	414	253	245

36 holes matches were played up to 1959, 18 hole matches from 1961 onwards. Fourball matches were first played in 1963. The table includes four 18 hole singles matches (in 1979, 1991, 1993 and 2025) which were not actually played because of injury but were declared as halved matches.

== Holes-in-one ==
The following players have scored a hole-in-one.

=== Europe ===
Hole	Player	Match	Type	Year
16th at Muirfield	Peter Butler	Brian Barnes & Peter Butler lost 1 hole v Jack Nicklaus & Tom Weiskopf	Foursomes	1973
14th at The Belfry	Nick Faldo	Nick Faldo halved with Paul Azinger	Singles	1993
6th at Oak Hill	Costantino Rocca	Sam Torrance & Costantino Rocca won 6 & 5 v Davis Love III & Jeff Maggert	Foursomes	1995
11th at Oak Hill	Howard Clark	Howard Clark won 1 hole v Peter Jacobsen	Singles	1995
14th at The K Club	Paul Casey	Paul Casey & David Howell won 5 & 4 v Stewart Cink & Zach Johnson	Foursomes	2006

=== United States ===
Hole	Player	Match	Type	Year
14th at The K Club	Scott Verplank	Scott Verplank won 4 & 3 v Pádraig Harrington	Singles	2006

== Largest margins of victory in a match ==
=== 36 hole matches (to 1959) ===
All victories by 7 or more holes for Europe and by 8 or more holes for the United States are listed.

==== Europe ====
Margin	Winner	Loser	Type	Year
10 & 8	George Duncan	Walter Hagen	Singles	1929
9 & 8	Abe Mitchell	Olin Dutra	Singles	1933
9 & 7	Fred Daly	Ted Kroll	Singles	1953

The largest victory in a foursomes match was a 7&5 win by Aubrey Boomer & Charles Whitcombe against Leo Diegel & Bill Mehlhorn in 1927.

==== United States ====
Margin	Winner	Loser	Type	Year
10 & 9	Walter Hagen & Denny Shute	George Duncan & Arthur Havers	Foursomes	1931
10 & 9	Ed Oliver & Lew Worsham	Henry Cotton & Arthur Lees	Foursomes	1947
9 & 8	Leo Diegel	Abe Mitchell	Singles	1929
9 & 8	Paul Runyan & Horton Smith	Bill Cox & Ted Jarman	Foursomes	1935

=== 18 hole matches (from 1961) ===
All victories by 5 or more holes for Europe and by 6 or more holes for the United States are listed.

==== Europe ====
Margin	Winner	Loser	Type	Year
9 & 7	Ludvig Åberg & Viktor Hovland	Scottie Scheffler & Brooks Koepka	Foursomes	2023
7 & 5	José María Cañizares & José Rivero	Tom Kite & Calvin Peete	Foursomes	1985
7 & 5	Ian Woosnam & Bernhard Langer	Paul Azinger & Payne Stewart	Foursomes	1993
6 & 5	Dave Thomas & George Will	Arnold Palmer & Dave Marr	Foursomes	1965
6 & 5	Nick Faldo & Peter Oosterhuis	Andy Bean & Tom Kite	Foursomes	1979
6 & 5	Des Smyth & José María Cañizares	Bill Rogers & Bruce Lietzke	Fourball	1981
6 & 5	Seve Ballesteros & José María Olazábal	Tom Watson & Mark O'Meara	Fourball	1989
6 & 5	Ian Woosnam & Peter Baker	Fred Couples & Paul Azinger	Fourball	1993
6 & 5	Sam Torrance & Costantino Rocca	Davis Love III & Jeff Maggert	Foursomes	1995
6 & 5	Luke Donald & Lee Westwood	Steve Stricker & Tiger Woods	Foursomes	2010

The largest victory in a singles match has been a 5&4 win, achieved 9 times, firstly by Bernard Hunt against Jerry Barber in 1961.

==== United States ====
Margin	Winner	Loser	Type	Year
8 & 7	Tom Kite	Howard Clark	Singles	1989
8 & 7	Fred Couples	Ian Woosnam	Singles	1997
7 & 6	Miller Barber	Maurice Bembridge	Singles	1969
7 & 6	Lee Trevino	Brian Huggett	Singles	1971
7 & 6	Hale Irwin & Tom Kite	Ken Brown & Des Smyth	Foursomes	1979
7 & 6	Paul Azinger & Mark O'Meara	Nick Faldo & David Gilford	Foursomes	1991
7 & 6	Tom Lehman	Ignacio Garrido	Singles	1997
7 & 6	Keegan Bradley & Phil Mickelson	Lee Westwood & Luke Donald	Foursomes	2012

The largest victory in a fourball match has been a 7&5 win by Lee Trevino & Jerry Pate against Nick Faldo & Sam Torrance in 1981.

== Pairings ==
=== Most frequent pairings ===
Pairings used 7 or more times for Europe and 5 or more times for the United States are listed.

==== Europe ====
Pairing	Number	Points	First; Year	Last; Year	Overall Record; W–L–H	Foursomes Record; W–L–H	Fourballs Record; W–L–H
Seve Ballesteros & José María Olazábal	15	12	1987	1993	11–2–2	6–1–1	5–1–1
Peter Alliss & Christy O'Connor Snr	12	5.5	1959	1969	5–6–1	4–4–1	1–2–0
Brian Barnes & Bernard Gallacher	10	5.5	1973	1979	5–4–1	2–3–0	3–1–1
Nick Faldo & Ian Woosnam	10	6	1987	1991	5–3–2	2–1–2	3–2–0
Neil Coles & Bernard Hunt	8	2.5	1963	1967	2–5–1	1–2–1	1–3–0
Darren Clarke & Lee Westwood	8	6	1999	2006	6–2–0	3–1–0	3–1–0
Justin Rose & Henrik Stenson	8	6	2014	2018	6–2–0	3–1–0	3–1–0
Neil Coles & Christy O'Connor Snr	7	3.5	1963	1973	3–3–1	2–1–0	1–2–1
Tony Jacklin & Peter Oosterhuis	7	4	1973	1975	3–2–2	1–1–1	2–1–1
Nick Faldo & Colin Montgomerie	7	3.5	1993	1995	3–3–1	3–1–0	0–2–1
Bernhard Langer & Colin Montgomerie	7	5.5	1991	2002	5–1–1	3–0–1	2–1–0
Sergio García & Lee Westwood	7	5	2002	2008	4–1–2	2–0–1	2–1–1

==== United States ====
Pairing	Number	Points	First; Year	Last; Year	Overall Record; W–L–H	Foursomes Record; W–L–H	Fourballs Record; W–L–H
Jordan Spieth & Justin Thomas	9	4.5	2018	2023	4–4–1	2–3–0	2–1–1
Patrick Reed & Jordan Spieth	7	5	2014	2016	4–1–2	1–0–2	3–1–0
Larry Nelson & Lanny Wadkins	6	4	1979	1987	4–2–0	2–1–0	2–1–0
Tom Kite & Curtis Strange	6	2.5	1987	1989	2–3–1	2–1–1	0–2–0
Phil Mickelson & David Toms	6	3.5	2002	2006	3–2–1	2–1–1	1–1–0
Steve Stricker & Tiger Woods	6	2	2010	2012	2–4–0	1–2–0	1–2–0
Webb Simpson & Bubba Watson	6	3	2012	2018	3–3–0	1–2–0	2–1–0
Patrick Cantlay & Xander Schauffele	6	3	2021	2025	3–3–0	3–3–0	0–0–0
Julius Boros & Tony Lema	5	3.5	1963	1965	3–1–1	3–0–1	0–1–0
Gardner Dickinson & Arnold Palmer	5	5	1967	1971	5–0–0	4–0–0	1–0–0
Keegan Bradley & Phil Mickelson	5	4	2012	2014	4–1–0	2–1–0	2–0–0

== Age-related records ==
The ages given are on the first day of the Ryder Cup. Generally the leading 5 in each category are given.

=== Youngest players ===
==== Europe ====
Age	Player	Year	Date of Birth	Date of Cup
19 years, 258 days	Sergio García	1999	9 January 1980	24 September 1999
20 years, 59 days	Nick Faldo	1977	18 July 1957	15 September 1977
20 years, 216 days	Paul Way	1983	12 March 1963	14 October 1983
20 years, 221 days	Bernard Gallacher	1969	9 February 1949	18 September 1969
20 years, 249 days	Ken Brown	1977	9 January 1957	15 September 1977

==== United States ====
Age	Player	Year	Date of Birth	Date of Cup
20 years, 339 days	Horton Smith	1929	22 May 1908	26 April 1929
21 years, 61 days	Jordan Spieth	2014	27 July 1993	26 September 2014
21 years, 270 days	Tiger Woods	1997	30 December 1975	26 September 1997
21 years, 292 days	Rickie Fowler	2010	13 December 1988	1 October 2010
23 years, 35 days	Horton Smith	1931	22 May 1908	26 June 1931

=== Oldest players ===
==== Europe ====
Age	Player	Year	Date of Birth	Date of Cup
50 years, 67 days	Ted Ray	1927	28 March 1877	3 June 1927
48 years, 273 days	Christy O'Connor Snr	1973	21 December 1924	20 September 1973
48 years, 196 days	Dai Rees	1961	31 March 1913	13 October 1961
48 years, 153 days	Lee Westwood	2021	24 April 1973	24 September 2021
47 years, 283 days	George Duncan	1931	16 September 1883	26 June 1931

The oldest rookie was Ted Ray in 1927. Excluding Ray, who was playing in the first Ryder Cup, Tom Haliburton who was 46 years, 130 days in 1961 is the oldest European rookie.

==== United States ====
Age	Player	Year	Date of Birth	Date of Cup
51 years, 20 days	Raymond Floyd	1993	4 September 1942	24 September 1993
50 years, 290 days	Jay Haas	2004	2 December 1953	17 September 2004
49 years, 23 days	Raymond Floyd	1991	4 September 1942	27 September 1991
48 years, 104 days	Phil Mickelson	2018	16 June 1970	28 September 2018
48 years, 95 days	Fred Funk	2004	14 June 1956	17 September 2004

The oldest rookie was Fred Funk in 2004.

=== Longest lived players ===
==== Europe ====
Age ^{[†]}	Player	Birth	Death
95 years, 311 days	Ted Jarman	2 July 1907	9 May 2003
94 years, 153 days	Peter Mills	14 May 1931	Living
92 years, 288 days	John Panton	9 October 1916	24 July 2009
91 years, 335 days	Aubrey Boomer	1 November 1897	2 October 1989
91 years, 334 days	Sam King	27 March 1911	24 February 2003

Peter Mills is the only survivor from the 1957 and 1959 matches.

==== United States ====
Age ^{[†]}	Player	Birth	Death
100 years, 355 days	Jack Burke Jr.	29 January 1923	19 January 2024
97 years, 75 days	Gene Sarazen	27 February 1902	13 May 1999
95 years, 281 days	Doug Ford	6 August 1922	14 May 2018
94 years, 234 days	Byron Nelson	4 February 1912	26 September 2006
93 years, 248 days	Paul Runyan	12 July 1908	17 March 2002

† denotes age at death, or, if living, age as of 14 October 2025

=== Captains ===
- Youngest Ryder Cup captain: Arnold Palmer – 34 years, 31 days in 1963
- Youngest European captain: Charles Whitcombe – 35 years, 278 days in 1931
- Youngest non-playing captain: Ben Hogan – 37 years, 34 days in 1949
- Youngest non-playing European captain: Tony Jacklin – 39 years, 99 days in 1983
- Oldest Ryder Cup captain: Tom Watson – 65 years, 22 days in 2014
- Oldest European captain: J.H. Taylor – 62 years, 99 days in 1933
- Oldest playing captain: Ted Ray – 50 years, 67 days in 1927
- Oldest playing United States captain: Sam Snead – 47 years, 163 days in 1959
