= 1935 Open Championship =

Coordinates: 56.043°N 2.823°W

Tournament information
- Dates: 26–28 June 1935
- Location: Gullane, East Lothian, Scotland
- Course: Muirfield

Statistics
- Par: 72
- Length: 6,806 yards (6,223 m)
- Field: 109 players, 62 after cut
- Cut: 153 (+9)
- Prize fund: £500
- Winner's share: £100

Champion
- (England) Alf Perry
- 283 (−5)

Location in Scotland
Location in East Lothian, Scotland

The 1935 Open Championship was the 70th Open Championship, played 26–28 June at Muirfield in Gullane, East Lothian, Scotland. Alf Perry won his only major title, four strokes ahead of runner-up Alf Padgham.

Qualifying took place on 24–25 June, Monday and Tuesday, with 18 holes at Muirfield and 18 holes at the number 1 course Gullane, and the top 100 and ties qualified. Defending champion Henry Cotton led the field on 141; the qualifying score was 153 and 109 players advanced.

Cotton opened with 68 to take the lead on Wednesday, with Perry a stroke behind. Charles Whitcombe carded his own 68 in the second round and led by three over Cotton and Padgham after 36 holes, with Perry falling five back. The top sixty and ties would make the cut for the final 36 holes; it was at 153 (+9) and 62 advanced.

In the third round on Friday morning, it was Perry who caught fire with 67 to move ahead of Cotton and Whitcombe, who shot 76 and 73, respectively. A 72 in the final round that afternoon put Perry at 283, four strokes ahead of runner-up Padgham. Whitcombe finished one back in third, while Cotton had 75 and fell into a tie for seventh at 293. Amateur Lawson Little, the reigning British Amateur champion, shot 69 and climbed into a tie for fourth at 289. Perry's winning total equaled the tournament scoring record. Padgham won the following year at Hoylake.

Perry's win was his first in an important professional tournament, and he won just three more times. He finished third in 1939, but otherwise had no other top-10 finishes in a major championship. Perry was a member of three Ryder Cup teams in 1933, 1935, and 1937.

== Course ==
Hole	Yards	Par	Hole	Yards	Par
1	453	4	10	480	4
2	353	4	11	359	4
3	382	4	12	380	4
4	192	3	13	153	3
5	510	5	14	458	5
6	458	4	15	393	4
7	167	3	16	193	3
8	455	4	17	513	5
9	490	5	18	427	4
Out	3,450	36	In	3,356	36
Source:		Total		6,806	72

== Round summaries ==
=== First round ===
Wednesday, 26 June 1935

Place	Player	Score	To par
1	(England) Henry Cotton	68	−4
T2	(England) Alf Perry	69	−3
T2	(United States) Macdonald Smith	69	−3
T4	(England) Bob Kenyon	70	−2
T4	(Scotland) Eric McRuvie (a)	70	−2
T4	(England) Alf Padgham	70	−2
T7	(England) Bill Branch	71	−1
T7	(England) Arthur Lacey	71	−1
T7	(Republic of Ireland) Paddy Mahon	71	−1
T7	(England) Charles Whitcombe	71	−1

=== Second round ===
Thursday, 27 June 1935

Place	Player	Score	To par
1	(England) Charles Whitcombe	71-68=139	−5
2	(England) Henry Cotton	68-74=142	−2
T3	(England) Bill Branch	71-73=144	E
T3	(England) Bob Kenyon	70-74=144	E
T3	(England) Alf Perry	69-75=144	E
T6	(Jersey) Aubrey Boomer	76-69=145	+1
T6	(England) Bill Cox	76-69=145	+1
T6	(Scotland) Bill Laidlaw	74-71=145	+1
T6	(United States) Henry Picard	72-73=145	+1
T6	(United States) Robert Sweeny Jr. (a)	72-73=145	+1

=== Third round ===
Friday, 28 June 1935 (morning)

Place	Player	Score	To par
1	(England) Alf Perry	69-75-67=211	−5
2	(England) Charles Whitcombe	71-68-73=212	−4
3	(England) Alf Padgham	70-72-74=216	E
4	(United States) Henry Picard	72-73-72=217	+1
T5	(England) Henry Cotton	68-74-76=218	+2
T5	(England) Bert Gadd	72-75-71=218	+2
T5	(England) Bob Kenyon	70-74-74=218	+2
T8	(Jersey) Aubrey Boomer	76-69-75=220	+4
T8	(England) Bill Branch	71-73-76=220	+4
T8	(Scotland) Bill Laidlaw	74-71-75=220	+4
T8	(United States) Lawson Little (a)	75-71-74=220	+4

=== Final round ===
Friday, 28 June 1935 (afternoon)

Place	Player	Score	To par	Money (£)
1	(England) Alf Perry	69-75-67-72=283	−5	100
2	(England) Alf Padgham	70-72-74-71=287	−1	75
3	(England) Charles Whitcombe	71-68-73-76=288	E	50
T4	(England) Bert Gadd	72-75-71-71=289	+1	30
T4	(United States) Lawson Little (a)	75-71-74-69=289	+1	0
6	(United States) Henry Picard	72-73-72-75=292	+4	25
T7	(England) Henry Cotton	68-74-76-75=293	+5	20
T7	(England) Syd Easterbrook	75-73-74-71=293	+5	20
9	(England) Bill Branch	71-73-76-74=294	+6	15
10	(Scotland) Laurie Ayton, Snr	74-73-77-71=295	+7	15

Amateurs: Little (+1), Lucas (+12), Risdon (+13), Rutherford (+17), McLean (+19),
Sweeny (+19), McRuvie (+20), Thomson (+21), Francis (+22).
