= 1938 Open Championship =

Coordinates: 51.274°N 1.367°E

Tournament information
- Dates: 6–8 July 1938
- Location: Sandwich, England
- Course: Royal St George's Golf Club

Statistics
- Par: 70
- Field: 120 players, 37 after cut
- Cut: 148 (+8)
- Prize fund: £500
- Winner's share: £100

Champion
- (England) Reg Whitcombe
- 295 (+15)

Location in England
Location in Kent. England

The 1938 Open Championship was the 73rd Open Championship, held 6–8 July at Royal St George's Golf Club in Sandwich, England. In terrible weather conditions that caused scores to soar, Reg Whitcombe prevailed by two strokes over runner-up Jimmy Adams to win his only major title. The purse was £500 with a winner's share of £100.

It was planned to play the Championship at Royal Cinque Ports in nearby Deal, but abnormally high tides that February caused severe flooding to the course, leaving it like "an inland sea several feet deep." The venue was switched to Royal St George's, and Prince's replaced Royal Cinque Ports as the venue for one of the qualifying rounds.

Qualifying took place on 4–5 July, Monday and Tuesday, with 18 holes at St. George's and 18 holes at Prince's. The number of qualifiers was reduced this year to a maximum of 130, and ties for 130th place did not qualify. John Fallon led the qualifiers on 142; the qualifying score was 157 and 120 players advanced, with none from the United States.

Dick Burton, Jack Busson, and Bill Cox shared the 36-hole lead at even par 140, with Whitcombe two strokes back after consecutive rounds of 71. A maximum of 40 players after 36 holes made the cut to play on the final day, and ties for 40th place did not make the cut. It was at 148 (+8) and 37 advanced.

In the last two rounds on Friday, the weather turned from challenging to treacherous. Gale force winds ripped apart the large exhibition tent and scattered debris for a mile around. Alf Padgham drove the green on the 384-yard (351 m) 11th hole, while Cyril Tolley cleared the water on the 14th only to have the wind blow his ball back into the hazard. Only seven sub-80 scores were recorded in the final round. The leaders suffered terribly in the conditions: Burton finished 78-85, Busson shot 83-80, while Cox went 84-80. Whitcombe's scores of 75-78 were enough to post a 295 total, two ahead of Adams and three clear of defending champion Henry Cotton.

== Round summaries ==
=== First round ===
Wednesday, 6 July 1938

Place	Player	Score	To par
T1	(Scotland) Jimmy Adams	70	E
T1	(Republic of Ireland) Jimmy Bruen (a)	70	E
T1	(England) Bill Cox	70	E
T1	(France) Marcel Dallemagne	70	E
T1	(Scotland) John Fallon	70	E
T1	(England) Ernest Whitcombe	70	E
T7	(England) Dick Burton	71	+1
T7	(England) Jack Busson	71	+1
T7	(England) Bert Gadd	71	+1
T7	(England) Ted Jarman	71	+1
T7	(England) Alf Perry	71	+1
T7	(England) Charles Whitcombe	71	+1
T7	(England) Reg Whitcombe	71	+1

=== Second round ===
Thursday, 7 July 1938

Place	Player	Score	To par
T1	(England) Dick Burton	71-69=140	E
T1	(England) Jack Busson	71-69=140	E
T1	(England) Bill Cox	70-70=140	E
T4	(Scotland) Jimmy Adams	70-71=141	+1
T4	(England) Bert Gadd	71-70=141	+1
6	(England) Reg Whitcombe	71-71=142	+2
7	(England) Bob French	72-71=143	+3
T8	(Wales) Jimmy Black	72-72=144	+4
T8	(France) Marcel Dallemagne	70-74=144	+4
T10	(Scotland) Allan Dailey	73-72=145	+5
T10	(Scotland) John Fallon	70-75=145	+5
T10	(South Africa) Bobby Locke	73-72=145	+5
T10	(England) Alf Perry	71-74=145	+5
T10	(Wales) Dai Rees	73-72=145	+5
T10	(England) Cyril Tolley (a)	77-68=145	+5

=== Third round ===
Friday, 8 July 1938 (morning)

Place	Player	Score	To par
1	(England) Reg Whitcombe	71-71-75=217	+7
2	(England) Dick Burton	71-69-78=218	+8
3	(Scotland) Jimmy Adams	70-71-78=219	+9
4	(England) Alf Padgham	74-72-75=221	+11
5	(Scotland) Alf Perry	71-74-77=222	+12
6	(England) Jack Busson	71-69-83=223	+13
T7	(England) Fred Bullock	73-74-77=224	+14
T7	(England) Henry Cotton	74-73-77=224	+14
T7	(England) Bill Cox	70-70-84=224	+14
T7	(Wales) Dai Rees	73-72-79=224	+14

=== Final round ===
Friday, 8 July 1938 (afternoon)

Place	Player	Score	To par	Money (£)
1	(England) Reg Whitcombe	71-71-75-78=295	+15	100
2	(Scotland) Jimmy Adams	70-71-78-78=297	+17	75
3	(England) Henry Cotton	74-73-77-74=298	+18	50
T4	(England) Dick Burton	71-69-78-85=303	+23	23; 15s
T4	(England) Jack Busson	71-69-83-80=303	+23	23; 15s
T4	(Scotland) Allan Dailey	73-72-80-78=303	+23	23; 15s
T4	(England) Alf Padgham	74-72-75-82=303	+23	23; 15s
T8	(England) Fred Bullock	73-74-77-80=304	+24	15
T8	(England) Bill Cox	70-70-84-80=304	+24	15
T10	(England) Bert Gadd	71-70-84-80=305	+25	10
T10	(South Africa) Bobby Locke	73-72-81-79=305	+25	10
T10	(England) Charles Whitcombe	71-75-79-80=305	+25	10

Amateurs: Storey (+36), Tolley (+37), Thomson (+39), Pennink (+42).
