= 2018 Ryder Cup =

42nd edition of Ryder Cup, biennial men's golf competition

42nd Ryder Cup Matches
- Dates: 28–30 September 2018
- Venue: Le Golf National, Albatros Course
- Location: Guyancourt, Île-de-France, France
- Captains: Thomas Bjørn (Europe); Jim Furyk (USA)
(Europe)	17 1/2	10 1/2	(United States)
- Europe wins the Ryder Cup

Location map
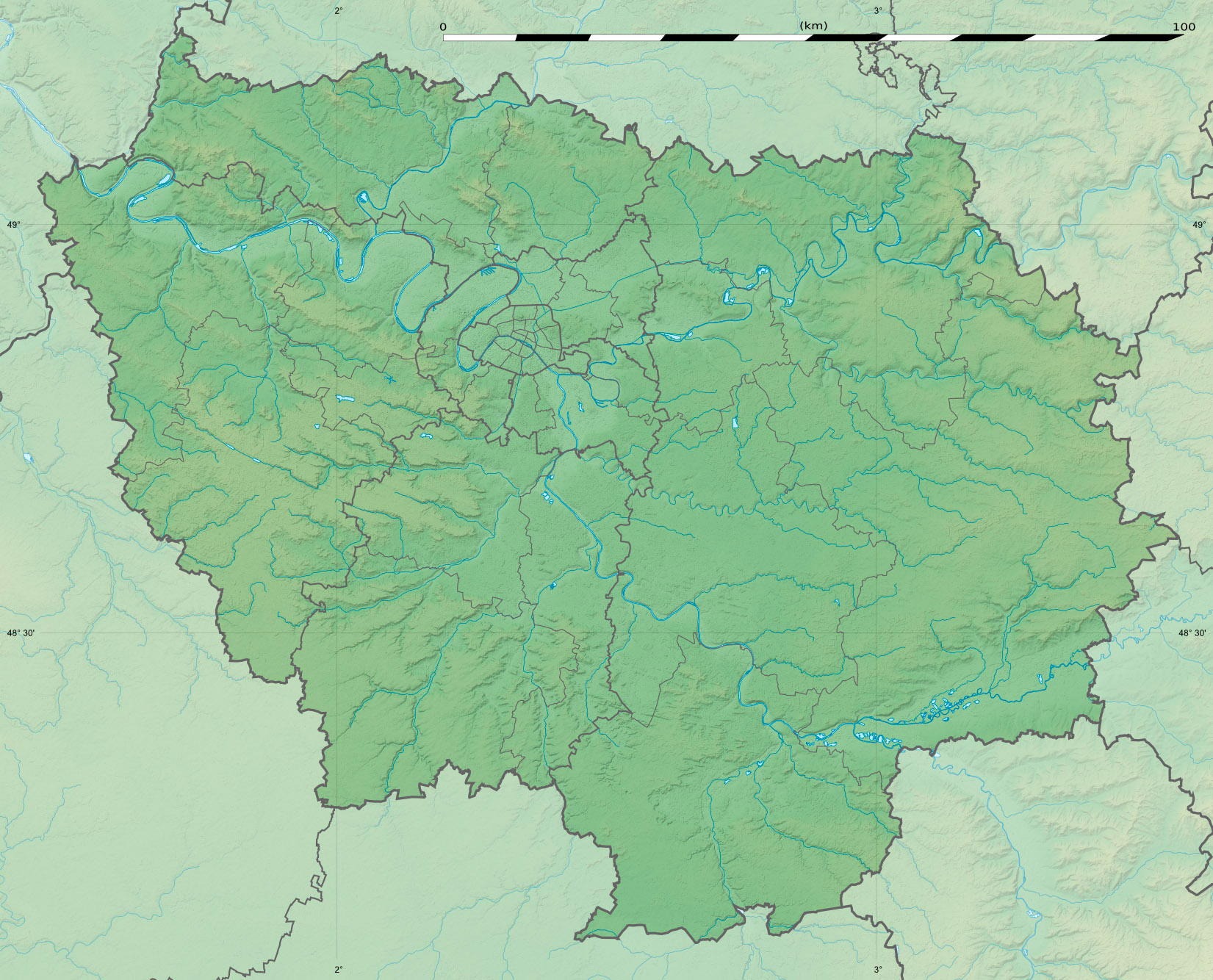
- Location in France Location in Île-de-France

The 42nd Ryder Cup Matches were held in France from 28 to 30 September 2018 on the Albatros Course of Le Golf National in Guyancourt, a suburb southwest of Paris. It was the second Ryder Cup to be held in Continental Europe (rather than Great Britain or Ireland), after the 1997 contest, which was held in Spain. The United States were the defending champions, but had lost the last five matches in Europe, having last won there in 1993. Europe regained the Ryder Cup, winning by 17 1/2 points to 10 1/2.

This was the last Ryder Cup to take place in even-numbered years, as the next Ryder Cup was played in 2021.

== Format ==
The Ryder Cup is a match play event, with each match worth one point. The competition format was as follows:

- Day 1 (Friday) – 4 foursome (alternate shot) matches and 4 fourball (better ball) matches
- Day 2 (Saturday) – 4 foursome matches and 4 fourball matches
- Day 3 (Sunday) – 12 singles matches

On the first two days there were four fourball matches in the morning and four foursome matches in the afternoon.

With a total of 28 points available, 14 1/2 points were required to win the Cup, and 14 points were required for the defending champion, the United States, to retain the Cup. All matches were played to a maximum of 18 holes.

== Bidding for the 2018 Ryder Cup ==
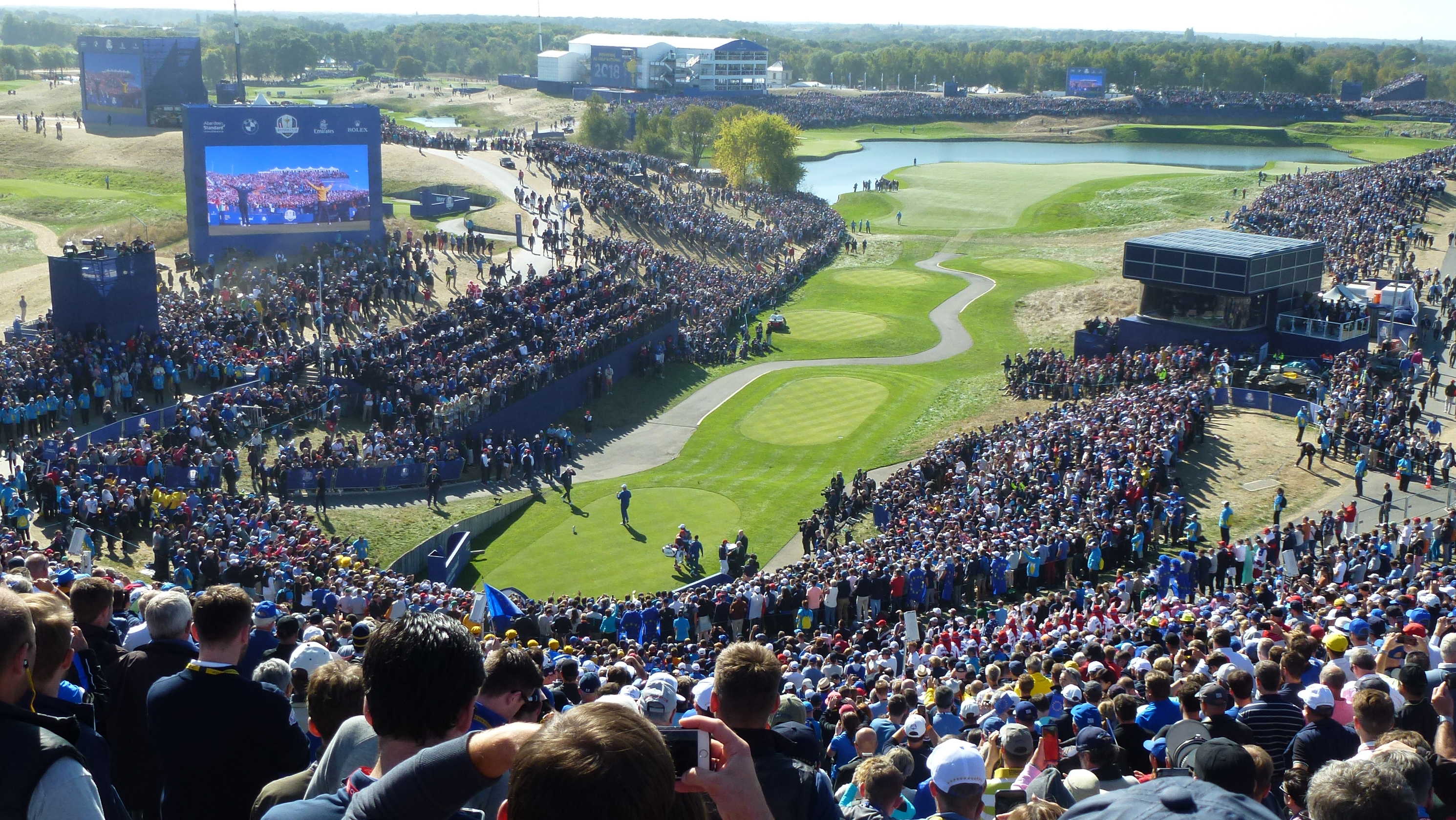
The Opening tee at the 2018 Ryder Cup at Le Golf National

Ryder Cup Europe confirmed originally six countries—France, Germany, the Netherlands, Portugal, Spain and Sweden—to be interested in bidding for the 2018 Ryder Cup. The deadline for the submission of bids was set for 30 April 2010; Sweden withdrew from the bidding early that month, while the Spanish bidding host city of Tres Cantos showed poor popular support.

There were five bids to host the event:

- France: Saint-Quentin-en-Yvelines
- Germany: Neuburg/Rohrenfeld
- Portugal: Lisbon/Comporta, Alentejo Coast
- Spain: Madrid/Guadarrama
- Netherlands: Rotterdam/Lingewaal

France was announced as host on 17 May 2011, despite calls for the Cup to be held in Spain as a tribute to the late Seve Ballesteros.

== Course ==
Hole	1	2	3	4	5	6	7	8	9	Out	10	11	12	13	14	15	16	17	18	In	Total
Metre	380	195	515	445	370	350	440	190	545	3,430	350	175	405	390	555	365	160	443	430	3,273	6,703
Yards	416	213	563	487	405	383	481	208	596	3,752	383	191	443	427	607	399	175	484	470	3,579	7,331
Par	4	3	5	4	4	4	4	3	5	36	4	3	4	4	5	4	3	4	4	35	71

== Team qualification and selection ==
=== Europe ===
The European team qualification rules were announced on 18 January 2017. There were a number of changes compared to 2016 with an increase in the number of captain's picks from three to four, based on recommendations from the analytics team behind Team Europe. The team consisted of:

- The leading four players on the Race to Dubai Points List
  - Points earned in all Race to Dubai tournaments starting with the 2017 D+D Real Czech Masters and ending with the 2018 Made in Denmark that finished on 2 September 2018. Points earned from the 2018 BMW PGA Championship onwards, were multiplied by 1.5.
- The leading four players, not qualified above, on the World Points List
  - Total World Points earned in Official World Golf Ranking events starting on 31 August 2017 (the start date of the D+D Real Czech Masters) and ending on 26 August 2018 and thereafter only at the Made in Denmark tournament. Points earned from the date of the 2018 BMW PGA Championship onwards, were multiplied by 1.5. No World points were earned from tournaments staged opposite Rolex Series tournaments in both 2017 and 2018.
- Four captain's picks

Membership criteria for the European Tour were reduced from five tournaments to four (outside the majors and WGCs) for the 2018 season. As in previous Ryder Cups, all players had to be members of the European Tour to be eligible to play for Europe. Changes were also made to the eligibility of future captains and vice-captains.

Paul Casey became a member of the European Tour at the start of 2018. Since he was not a member during 2017 he did not earn points until the start of 2018.

The leading players in the European Ryder Cup points lists were:

European points list
Position	Name	Points
1	Francesco Molinari (Q)	6,182,450.35
2	Justin Rose (Q)	4,518,651.42
3	Tyrrell Hatton (Q)	4,326,297.77
4	Tommy Fleetwood (Q)	3,668,310.57
5	Thorbjørn Olesen (q)	3,634,765.46
6	Jon Rahm (q)	3,617,769.82
7	Rory McIlroy (q)	3,482,791.06
8	Alex Norén (q)	3,444,442.21
9	Russell Knox	2,659,683.33
10	Eddie Pepperell	2,509,997.42
11	Matt Fitzpatrick	2,390,681.42
12	Rafa Cabrera-Bello	2,256,340.05
13	Matt Wallace	2,081,455.61
14	Ross Fisher	2,003,759.99
15	Jorge Campillo	1,782,949.97
16	Henrik Stenson (P)	1,666,022.41
17	Paul Dunne	1,628,405.68

World points list
Position	Name	Points
1	Francesco Molinari (q)	373.12
2	Justin Rose (q)	366.69
3	Jon Rahm (Q)	327.18
4	Rory McIlroy (Q)	309.29
5	Tommy Fleetwood (q)	308.71
6	Tyrrell Hatton (q)	252.68
7	Alex Norén (Q)	252.62
8	Thorbjørn Olesen (Q)	179.14
9	Ian Poulter (P)	170.87
10	Rafa Cabrera-Bello	168.75
11	Paul Casey (P)	167.05
12	Matt Fitzpatrick	159.05
13	Sergio García (P)	146.93
14	Eddie Pepperell	145.24
15	Russell Knox	144.71
16	Matt Wallace	143.22
17	Henrik Stenson (P)	140.62

Players in qualifying places (Q) are shown in green; captain's picks (P) are shown in yellow; those in italics (q) qualified through the other points list.

The remaining three players selected as captain's picks, Ian Poulter, Sergio García and Paul Casey, finished in 22nd, 24th and 35th place respectively on the European points list.

=== United States ===
The United States qualification rules were announced on 8 February 2017. The majority of the team were selected from the Ryder Cup points list which was based on prize money won in important tournaments. Generally one point was awarded for every $1,000 earned. The team consisted of:

- The leading eight players on the Ryder Cup points list, gained in the following events
  - 2017 major championships
  - 2017 World Golf Championship events and The Players Championship (half points)
  - 2018 major championships (double points for the winner, 50% extra for those who make the cut)
  - 2018 PGA Tour events. Qualifying events in this category were those played between 1 January and 12 August 2018, the date of the PGA Championship, and including the Zurich Classic of New Orleans team event. "Alternate" events (those played opposite a major or WGC event) did not earn points
- Four captain's picks
  - Three announced after the 2018 Dell Technologies Championship, which concluded on 3 September.
  - One announced after the 2018 BMW Championship, which concluded on 9 September.

The qualification rules were similar to those used for the 2016 Ryder Cup. The points given for the 2018 season major championships were reduced from double to 50% extra (except for the winner who still received double points). The dates on which the captain's picks were made were brought forward by one or two weeks.

The leading 15 players in the final points list after the final qualifying event, the 2018 PGA Championship were:

Position	Name	Points
1	Brooks Koepka	13,298.472
2	Dustin Johnson	9,549.287
3	Justin Thomas	8,929.122
4	Patrick Reed	7,821.880
5	Bubba Watson	5,584.137
6	Jordan Spieth	5,481.427
7	Rickie Fowler	5,006.112
8	Webb Simpson	4,534.745
9	Bryson DeChambeau	4,316.108
10	Phil Mickelson	4,207.953
11	Tiger Woods	4,196.794
12	Xander Schauffele	3,924.096
13	Matt Kuchar	3,843.696
14	Kevin Kisner	3,680.121
15	Tony Finau	3,512.021

Players in qualifying places are shown in green. Captain's picks are shown in yellow.

== Teams ==
=== Captains ===
Thomas Bjørn was named as the European captain on 6 December 2016. He was chosen by a five-man panel made up of the three most recent European Ryder Cup captains (Darren Clarke, Paul McGinley and José María Olazábal), the Chief Executive of the European Tour, Keith Pelley, and European Tour Tournament Committee member Henrik Stenson.

Jim Furyk was named as the USA captain on 11 January 2017.

=== Vice-captains ===
Each captain selected a number of vice-captains to assist him during the tournament.

Bjørn selected Robert Karlsson as his first vice-captain in May 2017. In May 2018 he selected four more vice-captains: Luke Donald, Pádraig Harrington, Graeme McDowell and Lee Westwood. Raphaël Jacquelin was also on hand for the Europeans, as an assistant.

Furyk named Davis Love III as a vice-captain, soon after his appointment in January 2017. He later added Steve Stricker and Tiger Woods in February 2018.

On 4 September 2018, Furyk named David Duval, Zach Johnson, and Matt Kuchar as additional vice-captains. Tiger Woods, who had previously been named a vice-captain, would no longer serve in this position as he was chosen to be one of Furyk's captain's picks.

=== Players ===
Thomas Bjørn announced the four captain's picks at 2 pm BST on 5 September. Captain's picks are shown in yellow. The world rankings and records were at the start of the 2018 Ryder Cup.

Europe team
Name	Country	Age	Points rank (European)	Points rank (World)	World ranking	Previous Ryder Cups	Matches	W–L–H	Winning percentage
Francesco Molinari	Italy	35	1	1	5	2	6	0–4–2	16.67
Justin Rose	England	38	2	2	2	4	19	11–6–2	63.16
Tyrrell Hatton	England	26	3	6	26	0	Rookie		
Tommy Fleetwood	England	27	4	5	12	0	Rookie		
Jon Rahm	Spain	23	6	3	8	0	Rookie		
Rory McIlroy	Northern Ireland	29	7	4	6	4	19	9–6–4	57.89
Alex Norén	Sweden	36	8	7	18	0	Rookie		
Thorbjørn Olesen	Denmark	28	5	8	45	0	Rookie		
Paul Casey	England	41	35	11	21	3	9	3–2–4	55.56
Sergio García	Spain	38	24	13	28	8	37	19–11–7	60.81
Ian Poulter	England	42	22	9	34	5	18	12–4–2	72.22
Henrik Stenson	Sweden	42	16	17	24	4	16	7–7–2	50.00

Captain's picks are shown in yellow. Jim Furyk announced three captain's picks at 5 pm EDT on 4 September. The final captain's pick was announced on 10 September after the conclusion of the BMW Championship. The world rankings and records were at the start of the 2018 Ryder Cup.

United States team
Name	Age	Points rank	World ranking	Previous Ryder Cups	Matches	W–L–H	Winning percentage
Brooks Koepka	28	1	3	1	4	3–1–0	75.00
Dustin Johnson	34	2	1	3	11	6–5–0	54.55
Justin Thomas	25	3	4	0	Rookie		
Patrick Reed	28	4	15	2	9	6–1–2	77.78
Bubba Watson	39	5	14	3	11	3–8–0	27.27
Jordan Spieth	25	6	10	2	9	4–3–2	55.56
Rickie Fowler	29	7	9	3	11	2–4–5	40.91
Webb Simpson	33	8	16	2	6	2–3–1	41.67
Bryson DeChambeau	25	9	7	0	Rookie		
Phil Mickelson	48	10	25	11	45	18–20–7	47.78
Tiger Woods	42	11	13	7	33	13–17–3	43.94
Tony Finau	29	15	17	0	Rookie		

== Friday's matches ==
=== Morning fourballs ===
The opening round of four fourball matches started at 8:10 am local time. Pairings were announced after the Opening Ceremony on Thursday. The first point of the 2018 Ryder Cup was won by Team USA, with Dustin Johnson and Rickie Fowler winning 4 & 2 against Rory McIlroy and Thorbjørn Olesen. Despite being two up with six holes to play, Jon Rahm and Justin Rose lost out to Brooks Koepka and Tony Finau on the 18th hole, while Jordan Spieth and Justin Thomas also won by one against Paul Casey and Tyrrell Hatton, putting Team USA 3–0 ahead. A spectator struck by Koepka's drive on the 6th hole lost the sight in one eye. Coming back from two down, Tommy Fleetwood and Francesco Molinari defeated Tiger Woods and Patrick Reed 3 & 1 to secure Team Europe's first point of the tournament, and to end the first morning 3–1 in favour of Team USA.

	Results
Rose/Rahm	(United States) 1 up	Koepka/Finau
McIlroy/Olesen	(United States) 4 & 2	Johnson/Fowler
Casey/Hatton	(United States) 1 up	Thomas/Spieth
Molinari/Fleetwood	(Europe) 3 & 1	Reed/Woods
1	Session	3
1	Overall	3

=== Afternoon foursomes ===
Europe's first clean sweep of the afternoon foursomes in the history of the Ryder Cup saw Team Europe end the day 5–3 ahead of Team USA. Sergio García and Alex Norén won 5 & 4 over Phil Mickelson and Bryson DeChambeau, Rory McIlroy and Ian Poulter came from two down after the first three holes to beat Bubba Watson and Webb Simpson 4 & 2, Fleetwood and Molinari repeated their morning success with a 4 & 3 win over Spieth and Thomas, while Justin Rose and Henrik Stenson beat Dustin Johnson and Rickie Fowler 3 & 2.

	Results
Stenson/Rose	(Europe) 3 & 2	Johnson/Fowler
Poulter/McIlroy	(Europe) 4 & 2	Watson/Simpson
García/Norén	(Europe) 5 & 4	Mickelson/DeChambeau
Molinari/Fleetwood	(Europe) 5 & 4	Thomas/Spieth
4	Session	0
5	Overall	3

== Saturday's matches ==
=== Morning fourballs ===
The Saturday fourballs saw Europe continue to dominate with wins for García/McIlroy (2 & 1) against Koepka and Finau, Casey/Hatton (3 & 2) against Fowler/Johnson and Molinari/Fleetwood (4 & 3) against Reed/Woods. Team USA secured their only point of the morning session with Thomas and Spieth defeating Poulter and Rahm 2 & 1, to leave the overall tournament at 8–4 in Team Europe's favour. Despite the strong performance, Team Europe captain Thomas Bjørn reiterated: "Nothing's won, we're just over the halfway stage. There's no bit happiness yet, there's still a determination and work to be done".

	Results
García/McIlroy	(Europe) 2 & 1	Koepka/Finau
Casey/Hatton	(Europe) 3 & 2	Johnson/Fowler
Molinari/Fleetwood	(Europe) 4 & 3	Reed/Woods
Poulter/Rahm	(United States) 2 & 1	Thomas/Spieth
3	Session	1
8	Overall	4

=== Afternoon foursomes ===
The afternoon session was drawn 2–2. It saw Team Europe's Molinari and Fleetwood win for the fourth time, a European record in the Ryder Cup, this time 5 & 4 over Woods and DeChambeau. Team USA's Spieth and Thomas defeated Poulter and McIlroy 4 & 3, while Simpson and Watson's green play saw them defeat Europe's García and Norén 3 & 2. The fourth pairing saw Rose and Stenson narrowly beat Johnson and Koepka 2 & 1 as a result of some good putting late in the round.

	Results
Stenson/Rose	(Europe) 2 & 1	Johnson/Koepka
García/Norén	(United States) 3 & 2	Watson/Simpson
Molinari/Fleetwood	(Europe) 5 & 4	Woods/DeChambeau
Poulter/McIlroy	(United States) 4 & 3	Thomas/Spieth
2	Session	2
10	Overall	6

== Sunday's singles matches ==
The United States put their best players at the top of the card on Sunday, and despite the four point deficit threatened a comeback in the singles, as they won 3 1/2 points from the first four matches. Justin Thomas beat Rory McIlroy on the final hole as the latter's approach found the water, and Tony Finau defeated the previously unbeaten Tommy Fleetwood 6 & 4. However, from then on Europe dominated, winning the next six matches to lead 16 1/2–9 1/2. Guarantees of at least a half-point each for García and Stenson (both of whom later got full points) meant that victory was already assured before the 14 1/2-point winning post was officially reached when Phil Mickelson, already three holes down, found the water on the 16th hole and conceded the hole and match to Molinari, who became the first player for Europe to score what is now the maximum possible five points in a single Ryder Cup. (Note: Tony Jacklin got 5 points (from 6 matches - 4 wins and 2 ties) playing for Great Britain in 1969 while Peter Alliss won 5 of his 6 matches in 1965.) Of the remaining two matches, one was won by the U.S. team and one by Europe, the last match decided with a long putt on the 18th green by Alex Norén for Europe, leaving the final score 17 1/2–10 1/2 to Europe. Sergio García's singles win made him the all-time Ryder Cup points leader, with 25 1/2 points in nine appearances, overtaking Nick Faldo's 25 points in 11 appearances. (Note: Besides losing his points record to Sergio García, Nick Faldo was also overtaken by Phil Mickelson for most appearances (with 12 to Faldo's 11) and most matches played (with 47 to Faldo's 46). Mickelson also overtook Arnold Palmer for most singles matches played by a US player (with 12 to Palmer's 11); he also set a Ryder Cup record of 22 losses, one ahead of Tiger Woods, Neil Coles, and Christy O'Connor Snr (see European and American playing records).)

	Results		Timetable
Rory McIlroy	(United States) 1 up	Justin Thomas	1st: 10–7
Paul Casey	halved	Brooks Koepka	2nd: 10 1/2–7 1/2
Justin Rose	(United States) 3 & 2	Webb Simpson	3rd: 10 1/2–8 1/2
Jon Rahm	(Europe) 2 & 1	Tiger Woods	6th: 12 1/2–9 1/2
Tommy Fleetwood	(United States) 6 & 4	Tony Finau	4th: 10 1/2–9 1/2
Ian Poulter	(Europe) 2 up	Dustin Johnson	7th: 13 1/2–9 1/2
Thorbjørn Olesen	(Europe) 5 & 4	Jordan Spieth	5th: 11 1/2–9 1/2
Sergio García	(Europe) 2 & 1	Rickie Fowler	10th: 16 1/2–9 1/2
Francesco Molinari	(Europe) 4 & 2	Phil Mickelson	8th: 14 1/2–9 1/2
Tyrrell Hatton	(United States) 3 & 2	Patrick Reed	11th: 16 1/2–10 1/2
Henrik Stenson	(Europe) 5 & 4	Bubba Watson	9th: 15 1/2–9 1/2
Alex Norén	(Europe) 1 up	Bryson DeChambeau	12th: 17 1/2–10 1/2
7 1/2	Session	4 1/2
17 1/2	Overall	10 1/2

== Individual player records ==
Each entry refers to the win–loss–half record of the player.

=== Europe ===
Player	Points	Matches	Overall	Singles	Foursomes	Fourballs
Paul Casey	1.5	3	1–1–1	0–0–1	0–0–0	1–1–0
Tommy Fleetwood	4	5	4–1–0	0–1–0	2–0–0	2–0–0
Sergio García	3	4	3–1–0	1–0–0	1–1–0	1–0–0
Tyrrell Hatton	1	3	1–2–0	0–1–0	0–0–0	1–1–0
Rory McIlroy	2	5	2–3–0	0–1–0	1–1–0	1–1–0
Francesco Molinari	5	5	5–0–0	1–0–0	2–0–0	2–0–0
Alex Norén	2	3	2–1–0	1–0–0	1–1–0	0–0–0
Thorbjørn Olesen	1	2	1–1–0	1–0–0	0–0–0	0–1–0
Ian Poulter	2	4	2–2–0	1–0–0	1–1–0	0–1–0
Jon Rahm	1	3	1–2–0	1–0–0	0–0–0	0–2–0
Justin Rose	2	4	2–2–0	0–1–0	2–0–0	0–1–0
Henrik Stenson	3	3	3–0–0	1–0–0	2–0–0	0–0–0

=== United States ===
Player	Points	Matches	Overall	Singles	Foursomes	Fourballs
Bryson DeChambeau	0	3	0–3–0	0–1–0	0–2–0	0–0–0
Tony Finau	2	3	2–1–0	1–0–0	0–0–0	1–1–0
Rickie Fowler	1	4	1–3–0	0–1–0	0–1–0	1–1–0
Dustin Johnson	1	5	1–4–0	0–1–0	0–2–0	1–1–0
Brooks Koepka	1.5	4	1–2–1	0–0–1	0–1–0	1–1–0
Phil Mickelson	0	2	0–2–0	0–1–0	0–1–0	0–0–0
Patrick Reed	1	3	1–2–0	1–0–0	0–0–0	0–2–0
Webb Simpson	2	3	2–1–0	1–0–0	1–1–0	0–0–0
Jordan Spieth	3	5	3–2–0	0–1–0	1–1–0	2–0–0
Justin Thomas	4	5	4–1–0	1–0–0	1–1–0	2–0–0
Bubba Watson	1	3	1–2–0	0–1–0	1–1–0	0–0–0
Tiger Woods	0	4	0–4–0	0–1–0	0–1–0	0–2–0
