= Allan Dailey =

Scottish golfer (1908–???)

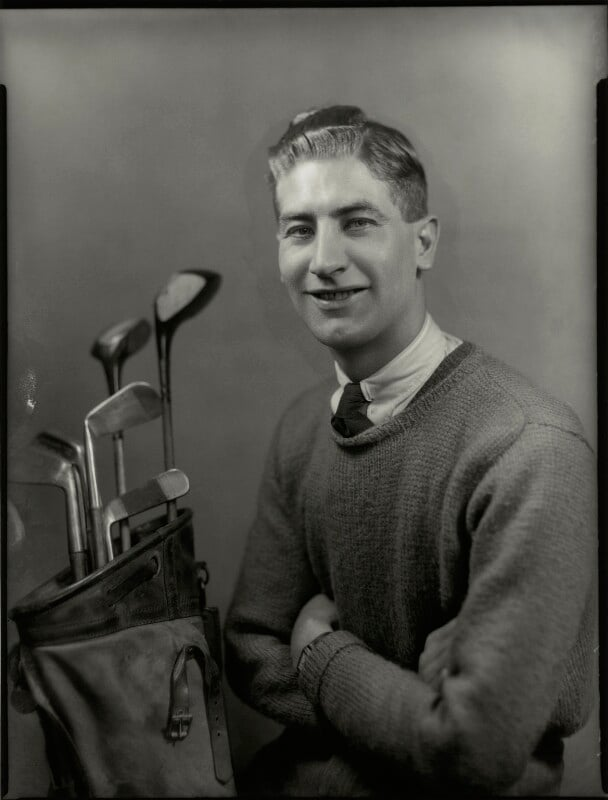
- Dailey in 1934

Personal information
- Full name: Allan Marshall Dailey
- Nationality: Scotland
- Born: 8 May 1908 Leuchars, Scotland

Career
- Sport: Golf
- Status: Professional
- Professional wins: 3

Best results in major championships
- Masters Tournament: DNP
- PGA Championship: DNP
- U.S. Open: DNP
- The Open Championship: T4: 1938

Allan Marshall Dailey (born 8 May 1908, date of death unknown) was a Scottish professional golfer. He won the Roehampton Invitation in 1933 and was subsequently selected for the 1933 Ryder Cup but didn't play in any matches. He finished in a tie for 4th place in the 1938 Open Championship. He was from a golfing family. His father James Russell Dailey was a professional golfer as was his brother Russell.

== Tournament wins (3) ==
This list may be incomplete

- 1933 Roehampton Invitation
- 1935 Dunlop-Southern Tournament
- 1948 News Chronicle Tournament (tie with Reg Horne)

== Results in major championships ==
Tournament	1930	1931	1932	1933	1934	1935	1936	1937	1938	1939
The Open Championship	CUT		CUT	27	T16	T37	T40	T32	T4	CUT

Tournament	1940	1941	1942	1943	1944	1945	1946	1947	1948	1949
The Open Championship	NT	NT	NT	NT	NT	NT		CUT	CUT	CUT

Note: Dailey only played in The Open Championship.

Top 10
Did not play

NT = No tournament
CUT = missed the half-way cut
"T" indicates a tie for a place

== Team appearances ==
- Ryder Cup (representing Great Britain): 1933 (winners)
- England–Scotland Professional Match (representing Scotland): 1932, 1933, 1934, 1935, 1936, 1938
- Llandudno International Golf Trophy (representing Scotland): 1938
