= Jack Busson =

English golfer (1910–1989)

Personal information
- Full name: John Joseph Busson
- Nationality: England
- Born: 2 November 1910 Hinckley, Leicestershire
- Died: 1 February 1989 (aged 78) Tadworth, Surrey

Career
- Sport: Golf
- Status: Professional
- Professional wins: 4

Best results in major championships
- Masters Tournament: DNP
- PGA Championship: DNP
- U.S. Open: DNP
- The Open Championship: T4: 1938

John Joseph Busson (2 November 1910 – 1 February 1989) was an English professional golfer. He played in the 1935 Ryder Cup.

He was a professional at Huddersfield and then at Pannal, Harrogate. In 1934, at the age of 23 he won the News of the World Match Play £1,040 tournament at Walton Heath. He beat Charles Whitcombe 2 up in the final and took the first prize of £300 and a large gold medal.

His older brother, Harry Busson (1907–1993), was also a professional golfer and was a well-known club maker.

== Professional wins ==
this list may be incomplete

- 1934 Leeds Cup, News of the World Match Play
- 1935 Malden Invitation Tournament
- 1938 Leeds Cup

== Results in major championships ==
Tournament	1932	1933	1934	1935	1936	1937	1938	1939
The Open Championship	CUT	T37		T12	T40	23	T4	32

Tournament	1940	1941	1942	1943	1944	1945	1946	1947	1948
The Open Championship	NT	NT	NT	NT	NT	NT	CUT		CUT

Note: Busson only played in The Open Championship.

Top 10
Did not play

NT = No tournament
CUT = missed the half-way cut
"T" indicates a tie for a place

== Team appearances ==
- Ryder Cup (representing Great Britain): 1935
- England–Scotland Professional Match (representing England): 1934 (winners), 1935 (winners), 1936 (winners), 1937 (winners)
