= Alf Perry =

English golfer (1904–1974)

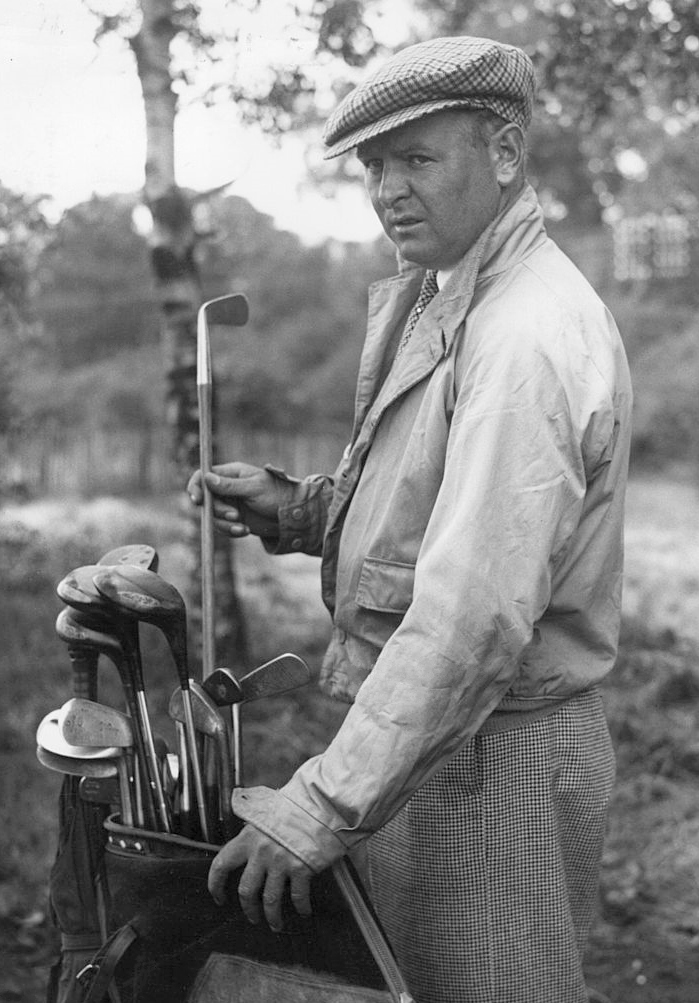

Personal information
- Full name: Alfred Perry
- Nationality: England
- Born: 8 October 1904 Coulsdon, Surrey, England
- Died: 4 December 1974 (aged 70) New Milton, Hampshire, England

Career
- Sport: Golf
- Status: Professional
- Professional wins: 8

Best results in major championships (wins: 1)
- Masters Tournament: DNP
- PGA Championship: DNP
- U.S. Open: DNP
- The Open Championship: Won: 1935

Alfred Perry (8 October 1904 – 4 December 1974) was a professional golfer from England, the winner of The Open Championship in 1935.

== Career ==
Born in Coulsdon, Surrey, Perry worked as a club professional at Leatherhead Golf Club in addition to playing in the few organised tournaments that there were at the time. He had moderate success before he claimed an unexpected victory in the 1935 Open Championship at Muirfield. His most prolific year came in 1938 when he won three tournaments on the British circuit. He retired from his post at Leatherhead in 1972, and died two years later.

Perry was a member of the British Ryder Cup team in 1933, 1935, and 1937. He played three matches of which he lost two and halved one.

== Professional wins ==
This list may be incomplete

- 1924 Findlater Shield
- 1925 Findlater Shield
- 1935 The Open Championship
- 1936 West of England Professional Championship
- 1938 Daily Mail Tournament, Yorkshire Evening News Tournament, Dunlop-Metropolitan Tournament
- 1948 Northern Professional Championship

== Major championships ==
=== Wins (1) ===
Year	Championship	54 holes	Winning score	Margin	Runner-up
1935	The Open Championship	1 shot lead	−5 (69-75-67-72=283)	4 strokes	(England) Alf Padgham

=== Results timeline ===
Tournament	1929	1930	1931	1932	1933	1934	1935	1936	1937	1938	1939
The Open Championship	T45	T30	46	T17	26	T26	1	T50	CUT	T15	T3

Tournament	1940	1941	1942	1943	1944	1945	1946	1947	1948	1949	1950	1951	1952
The Open Championship	NT	NT	NT	NT	NT	NT	T26	T18	T23	CUT	T33		CUT

Note: Perry only played in The Open Championship

Win
Top 10
Did not play

NT = No tournament
CUT = missed the half-way cut
"T" indicates a tie for a place

== Team appearances ==
- Ryder Cup (representing Great Britain): 1933, 1935, 1937
- England–Ireland Professional Match (representing England): 1932 (winners)
- England–Scotland Professional Match (representing England): 1933 (winners), 1936 (winners), 1938 (winners)
- Coronation Match (representing the Ladies and Professionals): 1937
