= 1989 Ryder Cup =

28th edition; golf tournament in England

28th Ryder Cup Matches
- Dates: 22–24 September 1989
- Venue: The Belfry, Brabazon Course
- Location: Wishaw, Warwickshire, England
- Captains: Tony Jacklin (Europe); Raymond Floyd (USA)
| (Europe) | 14 | 14 | (United States) |
- Europe retains the Ryder Cup

Location map
- Location within England

The 28th Ryder Cup Matches were held 22–24 September 1989 at The Belfry in Wishaw, Warwickshire, England, near Sutton Coldfield.

For only the second time, the competition ended in a draw at 14 points each, but the European team retained the Cup since they had won it outright in 1987. Europe held a two-point lead, 9 to 7, entering the singles matches on Sunday, and the match which retained the Cup for Europe was the eighth, between José María Cañizares and Ken Green. Cañizares made a two-foot (0.6 m) putt on the 18th green to win 1 up and give Europe a 14–10 lead, with four matches remaining on the course. The final four matches all resulted in U.S. wins and an overall draw.

This was the first Ryder Cup played in Europe to be televised live in the United States. It was carried by the USA Network on cable, with video provided by the BBC. The U.S. television coverage in 1985 was a highlight show on ESPN in early November, over a month after its completion. NBC Sports took over live weekend coverage in 1991 in South Carolina, and 1993 marked the first time a major U.S. network televised it live from Europe.

== Format ==
The Ryder Cup is a match play event, with each match worth one point. The competition format in 1989 was as follows:

- Day 1 (Friday) — 4 foursome (alternate shot) matches in a morning session and 4 four-ball (better ball) matches in an afternoon session
- Day 2 (Saturday) — 4 foursome matches in a morning session and 4 four-ball matches in an afternoon session
- Day 3 (Sunday) — 12 singles matches

With a total of 28 points, 14 1/2 points were required to win the Cup, and 14 points were required for the defending champion to retain the Cup. All matches were played to a maximum of 18 holes.

== Teams ==
The selection process for the European team remained the same as used in 1985 and 1987, with nine players chosen from the 1989 European Tour money list at the conclusion of the German Open on 27 August and the remaining three team members being chosen immediately afterwards by the team captain, Tony Jacklin. Prior to the final event Philip Walton was in the 9th qualifying place with Cañizares in 10th. Cañizares finished joint fifth in the German Open and took the final qualifying place with Walton dropping to 11th place behind Bernhard Langer who finished in 10th. Jacklin's choices were Langer, Christy O'Connor Jnr and Howard Clark. 1988 Masters winner Sandy Lyle had previously told Jacklin that he did not wish to be considered for selection.

Team Europe
| Name | Age | Points rank | World ranking | Previous Ryder Cups | Matches | W–L–H | Winning percentage |
| (England) Tony Jacklin | 45 | Non-playing captain |
| (Northern Ireland) Ronan Rafferty | 25 | 1 | 26 | 0 | Rookie |
| (England) Mark James | 35 | 2 | 35 | 3 | 10 | 2–7–1 | 25.00 |
| (Spain) José María Olazábal | 23 | 3 | 9 | 1 | 5 | 3–2–0 | 60.00 |
| (England) Nick Faldo | 32 | 4 | 3 | 6 | 22 | 14–7–1 | 65.91 |
| (Wales) Ian Woosnam | 31 | 5 | 6 | 3 | 12 | 5–5–2 | 50.00 |
| (Scotland) Gordon Brand Jnr | 31 | 6 | 47 | 1 | 4 | 1–2–1 | 37.50 |
| (Spain) Seve Ballesteros | 32 | 7 | 2 | 4 | 20 | 10–7–3 | 57.50 |
| (Scotland) Sam Torrance | 36 | 8 | 48 | 4 | 15 | 3–8–4 | 33.33 |
| (Spain) José María Cañizares | 42 | 9 | 59 | 3 | 9 | 4–3–2 | 55.56 |
| (West Germany) Bernhard Langer | 32 | 10 | 18 | 4 | 19 | 10–5–4 | 63.16 |
| (Republic of Ireland) Christy O'Connor Jnr | 41 | 12 | 71 | 1 | 2 | 0–2–0 | 0.00 |
| (England) Howard Clark | 35 | | 64 | 4 | 9 | 4–4–1 | 50.00 |

Captains picks are shown in yellow. The world rankings and records are at the start of the 1989 Ryder Cup.

Team USA
| Name | Age | Points rank | World ranking | Previous Ryder Cups | Matches | W–L–H | Winning percentage |
| Raymond Floyd | 47 | Non-playing captain |
| Mark Calcavecchia | 29 | 1 | 5 | 1 | 2 | 1–1–0 | 50.00 |
| Curtis Strange | 34 | 2 | 4 | 3 | 12 | 5–6–1 | 45.83 |
| Chip Beck | 33 | 3 | 10 | 0 | Rookie |
| Payne Stewart | 32 | 4 | 7 | 1 | 4 | 2–2–0 | 50.00 |
| Tom Kite | 39 | 5 | 8 | 5 | 20 | 11–6–3 | 62.50 |
| Paul Azinger | 29 | 6 | 13 | 0 | Rookie |
| Fred Couples | 29 | 7 | 15 | 0 | Rookie |
| Ken Green | 31 | 8 | 24 | 0 | Rookie |
| Mark O'Meara | 32 | 9 | 22 | 1 | 3 | 1–2–0 | 33.33 |
| Mark McCumber | 38 | 10 | 17 | 0 | Rookie |
| Tom Watson | 40 | | 19 | 3 | 12 | 9–3–0 | 75.00 |
| Lanny Wadkins | 39 | | 28 | 5 | 21 | 13–7–1 | 64.29 |

Captains picks are shown in yellow. The world rankings and records are at the start of the 1989 Ryder Cup.

== Friday's matches ==
=== Morning foursomes ===
| | Results |
|---|---|---|
| Faldo/Woosnam | halved | Kite/Strange |
| Clark/James | (United States) 1 up | Wadkins/Stewart |
| Ballesteros/Olazábal | halved | Watson/Beck |
| Langer/Rafferty | (United States) 2 & 1 | Calcavecchia/Green |
| 1 | Session | 3 |
| 1 | Overall | 3 |

=== Afternoon four-ball ===
| | Results |
|---|---|---|
| Torrance/Brand | (Europe) 1 up | Strange/Azinger |
| Clark/James | (Europe) 3 & 2 | Couples/Wadkins |
| Faldo/Woosnam | (Europe) 2 up | Calcavecchia/McCumber |
| Ballesteros/Olazábal | (Europe) 6 & 5 | Watson/O'Meara |
| 4 | Session | 0 |
| 5 | Overall | 3 |

== Saturday's matches ==
=== Morning foursomes ===
| | Results |
|---|---|---|
| Woosnam/Faldo | (Europe) 3 & 2 | Wadkins/Stewart |
| Brand/Torrance | (United States) 4 & 3 | Beck/Azinger |
| O'Connor/Rafferty | (United States) 3 & 2 | Calcavecchia/Green |
| Ballesteros/Olazábal | (Europe) 1 up | Kite/Strange |
| 2 | Session | 2 |
| 7 | Overall | 5 |

=== Afternoon four-ball ===
| | Results |
|---|---|---|
| Faldo/Woosnam | (United States) 2 & 1 | Beck/Azinger |
| Langer/Cañizares | (United States) 2 & 1 | Kite/McCumber |
| Clark/James | (Europe) 1 up | Stewart/Strange |
| Ballesteros/Olazábal | (Europe) 4 & 2 | Calcavecchia/Green |
| 2 | Session | 2 |
| 9 | Overall | 7 |

== Sunday's singles matches ==
| | Results |
|---|---|---|
| Seve Ballesteros | (United States) 1 up | Paul Azinger |
| Bernhard Langer | (United States) 3 & 2 | Chip Beck |
| José María Olazábal | (Europe) 1 up | Payne Stewart |
| Ronan Rafferty | (Europe) 1 up | Mark Calcavecchia |
| Howard Clark | (United States) 8 & 7 | Tom Kite |
| Mark James | (Europe) 3 & 2 | Mark O'Meara |
| Christy O'Connor Jnr | (Europe) 1 up | Fred Couples |
| José María Cañizares | (Europe) 1 up | Ken Green |
| Gordon Brand Jnr | (United States) 1 up | Mark McCumber |
| Sam Torrance | (United States) 3 & 1 | Tom Watson |
| Nick Faldo | (United States) 1 up | Lanny Wadkins |
| Ian Woosnam | (United States) 2 up | Curtis Strange |
| 5 | Session | 7 |
| 14 | Overall | 14 |

== Individual player records ==
Each entry refers to the win–loss–half record of the player.

=== Europe ===
| Player | Points | Overall | Singles | Foursomes | Fourballs |
|---|---|---|---|---|---|
| Seve Ballesteros | 3.5 | 3–1–1 | 0–1–0 | 1–0–1 | 2–0–0 |
| Gordon Brand Jnr | 1 | 1–2–0 | 0–1–0 | 0–1–0 | 1–0–0 |
| José María Cañizares | 1 | 1–1–0 | 1–0–0 | 0–0–0 | 0–1–0 |
| Howard Clark | 2 | 2–2–0 | 0–1–0 | 0–1–0 | 2–0–0 |
| Nick Faldo | 2.5 | 2–2–1 | 0–1–0 | 1–0–1 | 1–1–0 |
| Mark James | 3 | 3–1–0 | 1–0–0 | 0–1–0 | 2–0–0 |
| Bernhard Langer | 0 | 0–3–0 | 0–1–0 | 0–1–0 | 0–1–0 |
| Christy O'Connor Jnr | 1 | 1–1–0 | 1–0–0 | 0–1–0 | 0–0–0 |
| José María Olazábal | 4.5 | 4–0–1 | 1–0–0 | 1–0–1 | 2–0–0 |
| Ronan Rafferty | 1 | 1–2–0 | 1–0–0 | 0–2–0 | 0–0–0 |
| Sam Torrance | 1 | 1–2–0 | 0–1–0 | 0–1–0 | 1–0–0 |
| Ian Woosnam | 2.5 | 2–2–1 | 0–1–0 | 1–0–1 | 1–1–0 |

=== United States ===
| Player | Points | Overall | Singles | Foursomes | Fourballs |
|---|---|---|---|---|---|
| Paul Azinger | 3 | 3–1–0 | 1–0–0 | 1–0–0 | 1–1–0 |
| Chip Beck | 3.5 | 3–0–1 | 1–0–0 | 1–0–1 | 1–0–0 |
| Mark Calcavecchia | 2 | 2–3–0 | 0–1–0 | 2–0–0 | 0–2–0 |
| Fred Couples | 0 | 0–2–0 | 0–1–0 | 0–0–0 | 0–1–0 |
| Ken Green | 2 | 2–2–0 | 0–1–0 | 2–0–0 | 0–1–0 |
| Tom Kite | 2.5 | 2–1–1 | 1–0–0 | 0–1–1 | 1–0–0 |
| Mark McCumber | 2 | 2–1–0 | 1–0–0 | 0–0–0 | 1–1–0 |
| Mark O'Meara | 0 | 0–2–0 | 0–1–0 | 0–0–0 | 0–1–0 |
| Payne Stewart | 1 | 1–3–0 | 0–1–0 | 1–1–0 | 0–1–0 |
| Curtis Strange | 1.5 | 1–3–1 | 1–0–0 | 0–1–1 | 0–2–0 |
| Lanny Wadkins | 2 | 2–2–0 | 1–0–0 | 1–1–0 | 0–1–0 |
| Tom Watson | 1.5 | 1–1–1 | 1–0–0 | 0–0–1 | 0–1–0 |
