= 1965 Ryder Cup =

Golf tournament held in England

16th Ryder Cup Matches
- Dates: 7–9 October 1965
- Venue: Royal Birkdale Golf Club
- Location: Southport, England
- Captains: Harry Weetman (Great Britain); Byron Nelson (USA)
(United Kingdom)	12 1/2	19 1/2	(United States)
- United States wins the Ryder Cup

Location map
- Location within England

The 16th Ryder Cup Matches were held 7–9 October 1965 at Royal Birkdale Golf Club in Southport, England. For the first time commercialisation started to make a presence on site. The United States team won the competition by a score of 19 1/2 to 12 1/2 points.

== Format ==
The Ryder Cup is a match play event, with each match worth one point. From 1963 through 1971 the competition format was as follows:

- Day 1 — 8 foursomes (alternate shot) matches, 4 each in morning and afternoon sessions
- Day 2 — 8 four-ball (better ball) matches, 4 each in morning and afternoon sessions
- Day 3 — 16 singles matches, 8 each in morning and afternoon sessions

With a total of 32 points, 16 1/2 points were required to win the Cup. All matches were played to a maximum of 18 holes.

== Teams ==
The British team was determined using a points system. Compared to the system used in 1963, there was more emphasis on high finishes, points only being allocated to the leading 20 rather than the leading 40. Points were based on the actual finishing position, whereas previously non-eligible players had been excluded in determining positions. In addition, points were earned in a number of invitation events, including the Dunlop Masters, the Martini International and the Esso Golden Tournament. The Open champion remained an automatic choice but the News of the World Match Play champion was no longer guaranteed a place. Counting tournaments started with the 1964 Carroll Sweet Afton Tournament and finished with the 1965 Esso Golden Tournament. For the 1965 event the British PGA reduced the period that a tournament professional had to wait before becoming eligible for the Ryder Cup team from five years to three. This meant that ex-amateur golfers like Guy Wolstenholme (who turned professional in late 1960) and Doug Sewell (1961) became eligible. The field for the 1965 Esso Golden Tournament were the first 15 in the Ryder Cup points list. Before the event the leading seven were guaranteed their place in the team; the remaining eight being in contention for the three remaining places. Jimmy Hitchcock and Dave Thomas who were 8th and 9th before the event retained their places in the top 10 but Wolstenholme, who started 10th, was passed by George Will, the winner of the tournament.

Team Great Britain
Name	Age	Points rank	Previous Ryder Cups	Matches	W–L–H	Winning percentage
(England) Harry Weetman	44	Non-playing captain
(England) Peter Alliss	34	5	5	15	4–7–4	40.00
(England) Peter Butler	33	3	0	Rookie
(England) Neil Coles	31	2	2	10	2–5–3	35.00
(England) Jimmy Hitchcock	35	10	0	Rookie
(England) Bernard Hunt	35	1	5	15	3–9–3	30.00
(Republic of Ireland) Jimmy Martin	41	7	0	Rookie
(Republic of Ireland) Christy O'Connor Snr	40	4	5	14	4–9–1	32.14
(England) Lionel Platts	30	6	0	Rookie
(Wales) Dave Thomas	31	8	2	8	0–5–3	18.75
(Scotland) George Will	28	9	1	4	1–3–0	25.00

Despite having won his fourth major title as a professional at the Masters Tournament in April, 25-year-old Jack Nicklaus was not a member of the U.S. team. Eligibility rules set by the PGA prevented him from participating in the Ryder Cup until 1969. He competed as a player through 1981, missing only the 1979 edition, and was the non-playing captain of the U.S. team in 1983 and 1987.

Pott did not play due to a back injury.

Team USA
Name	Age	Previous Ryder Cups	Matches	W–L–H	Winning percentage
Byron Nelson	53	Non-playing captain
Julius Boros	45	2	6	3–1–2	66.67
Billy Casper	34	2	8	7–0–1	93.75
Tommy Jacobs	30	0	Rookie
Don January	35	0	Rookie
Tony Lema	31	1	5	3–0–2	80.00
Gene Littler	35	2	8	3–1–4	62.50
Dave Marr	31	0	Rookie
Arnold Palmer	36	2	10	7–2–1	75.00
Johnny Pott	29	1	3	1–2–0	33.33
Ken Venturi	34	0	Rookie

== Thursday's matches ==
=== Morning foursomes ===
	Results
Platts/Butler	(United States) 1 up	Boros/Lema
Thomas/Will	(United Kingdom) 6 & 5	Palmer/Marr
Hunt/Coles	(United States) 2 & 1	Casper/Littler
Alliss/O'Connor	(United Kingdom) 5 & 4	Venturi/January
2	Session	2
2	Overall	2

=== Afternoon foursomes ===
	Results
Thomas/Will	(United States) 6 & 5	Palmer/Marr
Alliss/O'Connor	(United Kingdom) 2 & 1	Casper/Littler
Martin/Hitchcock	(United States) 5 & 4	Boros/Lema
Hunt/Coles	(United Kingdom) 3 & 2	Venturi/January
2	Session	2
4	Overall	4

== Friday's matches ==
=== Morning four-ball ===
	Results
Thomas/Will	(United States) 1 up	January/Jacobs
Platts/Butler	halved	Casper/Littler
Alliss/O'Connor	(United States) 6 & 4	Palmer/Marr
Hunt/Coles	(United Kingdom) 1 up	Boros/Lema
1 1/2	Session	2 1/2
5 1/2	Overall	6 1/2

=== Afternoon four-ball ===
	Results
Alliss/O'Connor	(United Kingdom) 2 up	Palmer/Marr
Thomas/Will	(United States) 1 up	January/Jacobs
Platts/Butler	halved	Casper/Littler
Hunt/Coles	(United States) 1 up	Venturi/Lema
1 1/2	Session	2 1/2
7	Overall	9

== Saturday's matches ==
=== Morning singles ===
	Results
Jimmy Hitchcock	(United States) 3 & 2	Arnold Palmer
Lionel Platts	(United States) 4 & 2	Julius Boros
Peter Butler	(United States) 1 up	Tony Lema
Neil Coles	(United States) 2 up	Dave Marr
Bernard Hunt	(United Kingdom) 2 up	Gene Littler
Dave Thomas	(United States) 2 & 1	Tommy Jacobs
Peter Alliss	(United Kingdom) 1 up	Billy Casper
George Will	halved	Don January
2 1/2	Session	5 1/2
9 1/2	Overall	14 1/2

=== Afternoon singles ===
	Results
Christy O'Connor	(United States) 6 & 4	Tony Lema
Jimmy Hitchcock	(United States) 2 & 1	Julius Boros
Peter Butler	(United States) 2 up	Arnold Palmer
Peter Alliss	(United Kingdom) 3 & 1	Ken Venturi
Neil Coles	(United Kingdom) 3 & 2	Billy Casper
George Will	(United States) 2 & 1	Gene Littler
Bernard Hunt	(United States) 1 up	Dave Marr
Lionel Platts	(United Kingdom) 1 up	Tommy Jacobs
3	Session	5
12 1/2	Overall	19 1/2

== Individual player records ==
Each entry refers to the win–loss–half record of the player.

=== Great Britain ===
Player	Points	Overall	Singles	Foursomes	Fourballs
Peter Alliss	5	5–1–0	2–0–0	2–0–0	1–1–0
Peter Butler	1	0–3–2	0–2–0	0–1–0	0–0–2
Neil Coles	3	3–3–0	1–1–0	1–1–0	1–1–0
Jimmy Hitchcock	0	0–3–0	0–2–0	0–1–0	0–0–0
Bernard Hunt	3	3–3–0	1–1–0	1–1–0	1–1–0
Jimmy Martin	0	0–1–0	0–0–0	0–1–0	0–0–0
Christy O'Connor	3	3–2–0	0–1–0	2–0–0	1–1–0
Lionel Platts	2	1–2–2	1–1–0	0–1–0	0–0–2
Dave Thomas	1	1–4–0	0–1–0	1–1–0	0–2–0
George Will	1.5	1–4–1	0–1–1	1–1–0	0–2–0

=== United States ===
Player	Points	Overall	Singles	Foursomes	Fourballs
Julius Boros	4	4–1–0	2–0–0	2–0–0	0–1–0
Billy Casper	2	1–3–2	0–2–0	1–1–0	0–0–2
Tommy Jacobs	3	3–1–0	1–1–0	0–0–0	2–0–0
Don January	2.5	2–2–1	0–0–1	0–2–0	2–0–0
Tony Lema	5	5–1–0	2–0–0	2–0–0	1–1–0
Gene Littler	3	2–2–2	1–1–0	1–1–0	0–0–2
Dave Marr	4	4–2–0	2–0–0	1–1–0	1–1–0
Arnold Palmer	4	4–2–0	2–0–0	1–1–0	1–1–0
Ken Venturi	1	1–3–0	0–1–0	0–2–0	1–0–0

Johnny Pott did not play in any matches.
