= 1983 Ryder Cup =

Men's golf competition in Palm Beach Gardens, Florida

25th Ryder Cup Matches
- Dates: October 14–16, 1983
- Venue: PGA National Golf Club
- Location: Palm Beach Gardens, Florida
- Captains: Jack Nicklaus (USA); Tony Jacklin (Europe)
(United States)	14 1/2	13 1/2	(Europe)
- United States wins the Ryder Cup

Location map
- Location within Florida

The 25th Ryder Cup Matches were held October 14–16, 1983 at the PGA National Golf Club in Palm Beach Gardens, Florida. The United States team won the competition by a score of 14 1/2 to 13 1/2 points, the closest Ryder Cup since the tie in 1969. In their third competition with players from the continent, Europe showed the ability to realistically challenge the Americans. This was the first of four occasions that Tony Jacklin was the European captain and the sole occasion that his side lost.

Entering the singles matches on Sunday, the competition was even at 8 points each. Jacklin put his best players out early, while U.S. captain Jack Nicklaus saved his for last. In the first match, Seve Ballesteros was 3 up at the turn but needed an outstanding 3-wood from a fairway bunker on the final hole to salvage par and force a half with Fuzzy Zoeller. With ten matches complete and the score at 13 points each, the outcome depended on the two singles matches remaining on the course, between José María Cañizares and Lanny Wadkins and Bernard Gallacher and Tom Watson. The U.S. victory is generally accredited to Wadkins, who hit a wedge to less than three feet (0.9 m) on the par-5 18th hole to win the hole with a birdie and halve his match against Canizares. Gallacher had trailed all day, but Watson bogeyed 16 and was only 1 up with two holes to play. He had another bogey at the par-3 17th, but Gallacher's three-foot putt for bogey missed and ended the match at 2 & 1 and gave the U.S. the winning point.

This was the 13th consecutive win at home for the U.S. team, but they would have to wait until the 2021 Ryder Cup to post consecutive home victories. It was also the last victory for the U.S. in the Ryder Cup for eight years, until 1991.

== Format ==
The Ryder Cup is a match play event, with each match worth one point. The competition format in 1983 was as follows:

- Day 1 — 4 foursome (alternate shot) matches in a morning session and 4 four-ball (better ball) matches in an afternoon session
- Day 2 — 4 four-ball matches in a morning session and 4 foursome matches in an afternoon session
- Day 3 — 12 singles matches

With a total of 28 points, 14 1/2 points were required to win the Cup. All matches were played to a maximum of 18 holes.

== Teams ==
The American qualification rules remained unchanged from 1981 with 11 of the team being selected from a points list. The final place in the team was allocated to the winner of the 1983 PGA Championship (which finished on August 7), provided he was not in the top 11, in which case the 12th player in the points list would qualify. Qualification based on the points list finished after the Western Open on July 3. Tom Watson needed to win the final event to guarantee his place but finished second, lifting him from 14th to 12th place in the points list and pushing Hale Irwin out of that position. The PGA Championship was won by Hal Sutton with Jack Nicklaus second. Sutton was only in his third year as a professional and hence ineligible and so Watson retained his place on the team.

Team USA
Name	Age	Points rank	Previous Ryder Cups	Matches	W–L–H	Winning percentage
Jack Nicklaus	43	Non-playing captain
Lanny Wadkins	33	1	2	8	7–1–0	87.50
Raymond Floyd	41	2	4	15	5–7–3	43.33
Tom Kite	33	3	2	8	6–1–1	81.25
Fuzzy Zoeller	31	4	1	5	1–4–0	20.00
Craig Stadler	30	5	0	Rookie
Jay Haas	29	6	0	Rookie
Gil Morgan	37	7	1	2	0–0–2	50.00
Calvin Peete	40	8	0	Rookie
Ben Crenshaw	31	9	1	2	1–1–0	50.00
Bob Gilder	32	10	0	Rookie
Curtis Strange	28	11	0	Rookie
Tom Watson	34	12	2	7	5–2–0	71.43

The European team was chosen entirely from the 1983 European Tour money list as at the conclusion of the St. Mellion Timeshare TPC on September 18. Prior to the final event 10 of the players had guaranteed their places with Manuel Piñero in 11th position and Gordon J. Brand in 12th. Brand made sure of his place with fifth place in the TPC but Piñero was overtaken by Paul Way who finished second to lift him to 11th place in the list.

Team Europe
Name	Age	Points rank	Previous Ryder Cups	Matches	W–L–H	Winning percentage
(England) Tony Jacklin	39	Non-playing captain
(England) Nick Faldo	26	1	3	10	7–3–0	70.00
(Spain) Seve Ballesteros	26	2	1	5	1–4–0	20.00
(West Germany) Bernhard Langer	26	3	1	4	1–2–1	37.50
(Scotland) Sandy Lyle	25	4	2	9	3–5–1	38.89
(Scotland) Ken Brown	26	5	2	4	1–3–0	25.00
(Spain) José María Cañizares	36	6	1	3	1–2–0	33.33
(England) Brian Waites	43	7	0	Rookie
(Scotland) Sam Torrance	30	8	1	4	0–3–1	12.50
(Wales) Ian Woosnam	25	9	0	Rookie
(Scotland) Bernard Gallacher	34	10	7	29	13–11–5	53.45
(England) Paul Way	20	11	0	Rookie
(England) Gordon J. Brand	28	12	0	Rookie

== Friday's matches ==
October 14, 1983

=== Morning foursomes ===
	Results
Gallacher/Lyle	(United States) 5 & 4	Watson/Crenshaw
Faldo/Langer	(Europe) 4 & 2	Wadkins/Stadler
Cañizares/Torrance	(Europe) 4 & 3	Floyd/Gilder
Ballesteros/Way	(United States) 2 & 1	Kite/Peete
2	Session	2
2	Overall	2

=== Afternoon four-ball ===
	Results
Waites/Brown	(Europe) 2 & 1	Morgan/Zoeller
Faldo/Langer	(United States) 2 & 1	Watson/Haas
Ballesteros/Way	(Europe) 1 up	Floyd/Strange
Torrance/Woosnam	halved	Crenshaw/Peete
2 1/2	Session	1 1/2
4 1/2	Overall	3 1/2

== Saturday's matches ==
October 15, 1983

=== Morning four-ball ===
	Results
Waites/Brown	(United States) 1 up	Wadkins/Stadler
Faldo/Langer	(Europe) 4 & 2	Crenshaw/Peete
Ballesteros/Way	halved	Morgan/Haas
Torrance/Woosnam	(United States) 5 & 4	Watson/Gilder
1 1/2	Session	2 1/2
6	Overall	6

=== Afternoon foursomes ===
	Results
Faldo/Langer	(Europe) 3 & 2	Kite/Floyd
Torrance/Cañizares	(United States) 7 & 5	Morgan/Wadkins
Ballesteros/Way	(Europe) 2 & 1	Watson/Gilder
Waites/Brown	(United States) 3 & 2	Haas/Strange
2	Session	2
8	Overall	8

== Sunday's singles matches ==
October 16, 1983

	Results
Seve Ballesteros	halved	Fuzzy Zoeller
Nick Faldo	(Europe) 2 & 1	Jay Haas
Bernhard Langer	(Europe) 2 up	Gil Morgan
Gordon J. Brand	(United States) 2 up	Bob Gilder
Sandy Lyle	(United States) 3 & 1	Ben Crenshaw
Brian Waites	(United States) 1 up	Calvin Peete
Paul Way	(Europe) 2 & 1	Curtis Strange
Sam Torrance	halved	Tom Kite
Ian Woosnam	(United States) 3 & 2	Craig Stadler
José María Cañizares	halved	Lanny Wadkins
Ken Brown	(Europe) 4 & 3	Raymond Floyd
Bernard Gallacher	(United States) 2 & 1	Tom Watson
5 1/2	Session	6 1/2
13 1/2	Overall	14 1/2

== Individual player records ==
Each entry refers to the win–loss–half record of the player.

=== United States ===
Player	Points	Overall	Singles	Foursomes	Fourballs
Ben Crenshaw	2.5	2–1–1	1–0–0	1–0–0	0–1–1
Raymond Floyd	0	0–4–0	0–1–0	0–2–0	0–1–0
Bob Gilder	2	2–2–0	1–0–0	0–2–0	1–0–0
Jay Haas	2.5	2–1–1	0–1–0	1–0–0	1–0–1
Tom Kite	1.5	1–1–1	0–0–1	1–1–0	0–0–0
Gil Morgan	1.5	1–2–1	0–1–0	1–0–0	0–1–1
Calvin Peete	2.5	2–1–1	1–0–0	1–0–0	0–1–1
Craig Stadler	2	2–1–0	1–0–0	0–1–0	1–0–0
Curtis Strange	1	1–2–0	0–1–0	1–0–0	0–1–0
Lanny Wadkins	2.5	2–1–1	0–0–1	1–1–0	1–0–0
Tom Watson	4	4–1–0	1–0–0	1–1–0	2–0–0
Fuzzy Zoeller	0.5	0–1–1	0–0–1	0–0–0	0–1–0

=== Europe ===
Player	Points	Overall	Singles	Foursomes	Fourballs
Seve Ballesteros	3	2–1–2	0–0–1	1–1–0	1–0–1
Gordon J. Brand	0	0–1–0	0–1–0	0–0–0	0–0–0
Ken Brown	2	2–2–0	1–0–0	0–1–0	1–1–0
José María Cañizares	1.5	1–1–1	0–0–1	1–1–0	0–0–0
Nick Faldo	4	4–1–0	1–0–0	2–0–0	1–1–0
Bernard Gallacher	0	0–2–0	0–1–0	0–1–0	0–0–0
Bernhard Langer	4	4–1–0	1–0–0	2–0–0	1–1–0
Sandy Lyle	0	0–2–0	0–1–0	0–1–0	0–0–0
Sam Torrance	2	1–2–2	0–0–1	1–1–0	0–1–1
Brian Waites	1	1–3–0	0–1–0	0–1–0	1–1–0
Paul Way	3.5	3–1–1	1–0–0	1–1–0	1–0–1
Ian Woosnam	0.5	0–2–1	0–1–0	0–0–0	0–1–1

== Video ==
- 2012 Ryder Cup Ryder Cup Flashback: 1983
