= 1993 Ryder Cup =

30th Ryder Cup; golf tournament in England

30th Ryder Cup Matches
- Dates: 24–26 September 1993
- Venue: The Belfry, Brabazon Course
- Location: Wishaw, Warwickshire, England
- Captains: Bernard Gallacher (Europe); Tom Watson (USA)
(Europe)	13	15	(United States)
- United States wins the Ryder Cup

Location map
- Location within England

The 30th Ryder Cup Matches were held in England at The Belfry in Wishaw, Warwickshire, near Sutton Coldfield. The United States team won a second consecutive Ryder Cup, by a margin of 15 to 13 points. Europe took a slender one point lead into the Sunday singles matches in what was a close contest. Davis Love III secured victory for the U.S. by defeating Costantino Rocca at the last hole, 1 up. Through 2023, this is the most recent U.S. victory in Europe and also the last time the U.S. retained the Cup.

This was the first Ryder Cup played in Europe to be televised live in the United States by a major network, NBC. The 1989 edition was carried by the USA Network on cable, with video provided by the BBC. The U.S. television coverage in 1985 was a highlight show on ESPN in early November, over a month after its completion. NBC took over live weekend coverage in 1991 in South Carolina.

== Format ==
The Ryder Cup is a match play event, with each match worth one point. The competition format predominantly used from 1987 to 1999 was as follows:

- Day 1 (Friday) — 4 foursome (alternate shot) matches in a morning session and 4 fourball (better ball) matches in an afternoon session
- Day 2 (Saturday) — 4 foursome matches in a morning session and 4 four-ball matches in an afternoon session
- Day 3 (Sunday) — 12 singles matches

With a total of 28 points, 14 1/2 points were required to win the Cup, and 14 points were required for the defending champion to retain the Cup. All matches were played to a maximum of 18 holes - matches that were level after 18 holes were deemed a draw with half a point going to each team.

== Teams ==
The selection process for the European team remained similar to that used since 1985, with nine players chosen from a money list at the conclusion of the Volvo German Open on 29 August and the remaining three team members being chosen soon afterwards by the team captain. The beginning of the qualifying period was, however, extended to start with the Canon European Masters in Switzerland at the beginning of September 1992 rather than starting in January 1993. The change was made so that there would be more opportunities for the leading players to qualify by right. In 1991 two of the three captain's picks were given to José María Olazábal and Nick Faldo, then ranked two and three in the world, who had played most of their golf in the US and did not qualify automatically. A few European players declined invitations to the 1993 PGA Championship to play in the Hohe Brücke Austrian Open in order to gain Ryder Cup points. At this time prize money in the major championships played in the USA did not earn Ryder Cup points. Prior to the final event Sam Torrance had to withdraw from the final event because of injury but none of the other challengers for automatic places were able to pass him. Joakim Haeggman tied for 6th place in the German Open and rose from 14th to 10th place in the points list while Ronan Rafferty tied for 20th place and finished 11th. Gallacher made his picks on 30 August. It was widely expected that he would choose Seve Ballesteros and José María Olazábal as two of his selections and most interest centred on whether he would select Haeggman or Rafferty.

Team Europe
Name	Age	Points rank	World ranking	Previous Ryder Cups	Matches	W–L–H	Winning percentage
(Scotland) Bernard Gallacher	44	Non-playing captain
(Germany) Bernhard Langer	36	1	3	6	25	11–9–5	54.00
(England) Nick Faldo	36	2	1	8	31	17–12–2	58.06
(Scotland) Colin Montgomerie	30	3	16	1	3	1–1–1	50.00
(Italy) Costantino Rocca	36	4	40	0	Rookie
(England) Barry Lane	33	5	35	0	Rookie
(Wales) Ian Woosnam	35	6	7	5	21	8–10–3	45.24
(England) Peter Baker	25	7	64	0	Rookie
(England) Mark James	39	8	31	5	19	7–11–1	39.47
(Scotland) Sam Torrance	40	9	37	6	21	4–12–5	30.95
(Sweden) Joakim Haeggman	24	10	59	0	Rookie
(Spain) José María Olazábal	27	12	9	3	15	10–3–2	73.33
(Spain) Seve Ballesteros	36	38	21	6	30	17–8–5	65.00

Captains picks are shown in yellow. The world rankings and records are at the start of the 1993 Ryder Cup.

Team USA
Name	Age	Points rank	World ranking	Previous Ryder Cups	Matches	W–L–H	Winning percentage
Tom Watson	44	Non-playing captain
Paul Azinger	33	1	5	2	9	5–4–0	55.56
Fred Couples	33	2	6	2	7	3–3–1	50.00
Tom Kite	43	3	8	6	24	13–7–4	62.50
Lee Janzen	29	4	22	0	Rookie
Corey Pavin	33	5	15	1	3	1–2–0	33.33
Payne Stewart	36	6	11	3	12	5–6–1	45.83
John Cook	35	7	13	0	Rookie
Davis Love III	29	8	12	0	Rookie
Chip Beck	37	9	26	2	7	4–2–1	64.29
Jim Gallagher Jr.	32	10	53	0	Rookie
Raymond Floyd	51	22	23	7	27	9–15–3	38.89
Lanny Wadkins	43	32	74	7	30	18–10–2	63.33

Captains picks are shown in yellow. The world rankings and records are at the start of the 1993 Ryder Cup.

== Friday's matches ==
=== Morning foursomes ===
	Results
Torrance/James	(United States) 4 & 3	Wadkins/Pavin
Woosnam/Langer	(Europe) 7 & 5	Azinger/Stewart
Ballesteros/Olazábal	(United States) 2 & 1	Kite/Love III
Faldo/Montgomerie	(Europe) 4 & 3	Floyd/Couples
2	Session	2
2	Overall	2

=== Afternoon four-ball ===
	Results
Woosnam/Baker	(Europe) 1 up	Gallagher/Janzen
Langer/Lane	(United States) 4 & 2	Wadkins/Pavin
Faldo/Montgomerie	halved	Azinger/Couples
Ballesteros/Olazábal	(Europe) 4 & 3	Love III/Kite
2 1/2	Session	1 1/2
4 1/2	Overall	3 1/2

== Saturday's matches ==
=== Morning foursomes ===
	Results
Faldo/Montgomerie	(Europe) 3 & 2	Wadkins/Pavin
Langer/Woosnam	(Europe) 2 & 1	Couples/Azinger
Baker/Lane	(United States) 3 & 2	Floyd/Stewart
Ballesteros/Olazábal	(Europe) 2 & 1	Love III/Kite
3	Session	1
7 1/2	Overall	4 1/2

=== Afternoon four-ball ===
	Results
Faldo/Montgomerie	(United States) 2 up	Cook/Beck
James/Rocca	(United States) 5 & 4	Pavin/Gallagher
Woosnam/Baker	(Europe) 6 & 5	Couples/Azinger
Olazábal/Haeggman	(United States) 2 & 1	Floyd/Stewart
1	Session	3
8 1/2	Overall	7 1/2

== Sunday's singles matches ==
	Results
Ian Woosnam	halved	Fred Couples
Barry Lane	(United States) 1 up	Chip Beck
Colin Montgomerie	(Europe) 1 up	Lee Janzen
Peter Baker	(Europe) 2 up	Corey Pavin
Joakim Haeggman	(Europe) 1 up	John Cook
Mark James	(United States) 3 & 2	Payne Stewart
Costantino Rocca	(United States) 1 up	Davis Love III
Seve Ballesteros	(United States) 3 & 2	Jim Gallagher
José María Olazábal	(United States) 2 up	Raymond Floyd
Bernhard Langer	(United States) 5 & 3	Tom Kite
Nick Faldo	halved	Paul Azinger
Sam Torrance	halved	Lanny Wadkins
4 1/2	Session	7 1/2
13	Overall	15

== Individual player records ==
Each entry refers to the win–loss–half record of the player.

=== Europe ===
Player	Points	Overall	Singles	Foursomes	Fourballs
Peter Baker	3	3–1–0	1–0–0	0–1–0	2–0–0
Seve Ballesteros	2	2–2–0	0–1–0	1–1–0	1–0–0
Nick Faldo	3	2–1–2	0–0–1	2–0–0	0–1–1
Joakim Haeggman	1	1–1–0	1–0–0	0–0–0	0–1–0
Mark James	0	0–3–0	0–1–0	0–1–0	0–1–0
Barry Lane	0	0–3–0	0–1–0	0–1–0	0–1–0
Bernhard Langer	2	2–2–0	0–1–0	2–0–0	0–1–0
Colin Montgomerie	3.5	3–1–1	1–0–0	2–0–0	0–1–1
José María Olazábal	2	2–3–0	0–1–0	1–1–0	1–1–0
Costantino Rocca	0	0–2–0	0–1–0	0–0–0	0–1–0
Sam Torrance	0.5	0–1–1	0–0–1	0–1–0	0–0–0
Ian Woosnam	4.5	4–0–1	0–0–1	2–0–0	2–0–0

=== United States ===
Player	Points	Overall	Singles	Foursomes	Fourballs
Paul Azinger	1	0–3–2	0–0–1	0–2–0	0–1–1
Chip Beck	2	2–0–0	1–0–0	0–0–0	1–0–0
John Cook	1	1–1–0	0–1–0	0–0–0	1–0–0
Fred Couples	1	0–3–2	0–0–1	0–2–0	0–1–1
Raymond Floyd	3	3–1–0	1–0–0	1–1–0	1–0–0
Jim Gallagher Jr.	2	2–1–0	1–0–0	0–0–0	1–1–0
Lee Janzen	0	0–2–0	0–1–0	0–0–0	0–1–0
Tom Kite	2	2–2–0	1–0–0	1–1–0	0–1–0
Davis Love III	2	2–2–0	1–0–0	1–1–0	0–1–0
Corey Pavin	3	3–2–0	0–1–0	1–1–0	2–0–0
Payne Stewart	3	3–1–0	1–0–0	1–1–0	1–0–0
Lanny Wadkins	2.5	2–1–1	0–0–1	1–1–0	1–0–0
