= 1935 Ryder Cup =

Golf tournament in the United States

5th Ryder Cup Matches
- Dates: September 28–29, 1935
- Venue: Ridgewood Country Club
- Location: Paramus, New Jersey
- Captains: Walter Hagen (USA); Charles Whitcombe (Great Britain)
(United States)	9	3	(United Kingdom)
- United States wins the Ryder Cup

Location map
- Location within New Jersey

The 5th Ryder Cup Matches were held at the Ridgewood Country Club in Paramus, New Jersey, a suburb northwest of New York City in Bergen County. The United States team won the competition by a score of 9–3 points to regain the cup.

The U.S. took a 3–2 lead in the series, all of which were won on home soil. It was the first of seven consecutive wins by the U.S. side, which did not lose again until 1957 in England.

== Format ==
The Ryder Cup is a match play event, with each match worth one point. From 1927 through 1959, the format consisted of 4 foursome (alternate shot) matches on the first day and 8 singles matches on the second day, for a total of 12 points. Therefore, 6 1/2 points were required to win the Cup. All matches were played to a maximum of 36 holes.

== Teams ==
Team USA
Name	Age	Previous Ryder Cups	Matches	W–L–H	Winning percentage
Walter Hagen – captain	42	4	8	6–1–1	81.25
Olin Dutra	34	1	2	0–2–0	0.00
Ky Laffoon	26	0	Rookie
Sam Parks	26	0	Rookie
Henry Picard	28	0	Rookie
Johnny Revolta	24	0	Rookie
Paul Runyan	27	1	2	0–2–0	0.00
Gene Sarazen	33	4	8	4–2–2	62.50
Horton Smith	27	3	2	2–0–0	100.00
Craig Wood	33	2	3	1–2–0	33.33

In February 1935, it was announced that a selection committee of six would choose the Great Britain team for the 1935 Ryder Cup. As in 1933, Henry Cotton would not be considered as he was employed by a Belgium club. In July, the first eight players were selected: Alliss, Burton, Busson, Cox, Jarman, Padgham, Perry and Charles Whitcombe. Whitcombe was chosen as captain. In August the remaining two, Ernest and Reg Whitcombe were selected.

The British team sailed from Southampton on the Empress of Australia for Quebec on September 14 following the conclusion of the News of the World Match Play the previous day. They returned from New York on board Aquitania leaving on October 17.

Team Great Britain
Name	Age	Previous Ryder Cups	Matches	W–L–H	Winning percentage
(England) Charles Whitcombe – captain	40	4	7	2–2–3	50.00
(England) Percy Alliss	38	2	2	1–0–1	75.00
(England) Dick Burton	27	0	Rookie
(England) Jack Busson	24	0	Rookie
(England) Bill Cox	25	0	Rookie
(England) Ted Jarman	28	0	Rookie
(England) Alf Padgham	29	1	2	0–2–0	0.00
(England) Alf Perry	30	1	1	0–1–0	0.00
(England) Ernest Whitcombe	44	2	4	0–3–1	12.50
(England) Reg Whitcombe	37	0	Rookie

== Saturday's foursome matches ==
	Results
Perry/Busson	(United States) 7 & 6	Sarazen/Hagen
Padgham/Alliss	(United States) 6 & 5	Picard/Revolta
Cox/Jarman	(United States) 9 & 8	Runyan/Smith
C. Whitcombe/E. Whitcombe	(United Kingdom) 1 up	Dutra/Laffoon
1	Session	3
1	Overall	3

== Sunday's singles matches ==
	Results
Jack Busson	(United States) 3 & 2	Gene Sarazen
Dick Burton	(United States) 5 & 3	Paul Runyan
Reg Whitcombe	(United States) 2 & 1	Johnny Revolta
Alf Padgham	(United States) 4 & 2	Olin Dutra
Percy Alliss	(United Kingdom) 1 up	Craig Wood
Bill Cox	halved	Horton Smith
Ernest Whitcombe	(United States) 3 & 2	Henry Picard
Alf Perry	halved	Sam Parks
2	Session	6
3	Overall	9

== Individual player records ==
Each entry refers to the win–loss–half record of the player.

=== United States ===
Player	Points	Overall	Singles	Foursomes
Olin Dutra	1	1–1–0	1–0–0	0–1–0
Walter Hagen	1	1–0–0	0–0–0	1–0–0
Ky Laffoon	0	0–1–0	0–0–0	0–1–0
Sam Parks	0.5	0–0–1	0–0–1	0–0–0
Henry Picard	2	2–0–0	1–0–0	1–0–0
Johnny Revolta	2	2–0–0	1–0–0	1–0–0
Paul Runyan	2	2–0–0	1–0–0	1–0–0
Gene Sarazen	2	2–0–0	1–0–0	1–0–0
Horton Smith	1.5	1–0–1	0–0–1	1–0–0
Craig Wood	0	0–1–0	0–1–0	0–0–0

=== Great Britain ===
Player	Points	Overall	Singles	Foursomes
Percy Alliss	1	1–1–0	1–0–0	0–1–0
Dick Burton	0	0–1–0	0–1–0	0–0–0
Jack Busson	0	0–2–0	0–1–0	0–1–0
Bill Cox	0.5	0–1–1	0–0–1	0–1–0
Ted Jarman	0	0–1–0	0–0–0	0–1–0
Alf Padgham	0	0–2–0	0–1–0	0–1–0
Alf Perry	0.5	0–1–1	0–0–1	0–1–0
Charles Whitcombe	1	1–0–0	0–0–0	1–0–0
Ernest Whitcombe	1	1–1–0	0–1–0	1–0–0
Reg Whitcombe	0	0–1–0	0–1–0	0–0–0
