= Ted Jarman =

English golfer (1907–2003)

Personal information
- Full name: Edward William George Jarman
- Nationality: England
- Born: 2 July 1907 Margate, Kent, England
- Died: 9 May 2003 (aged 95) Wombourne, Staffordshire, England

Career
- Sport: Golf
- Status: Professional
- Professional wins: 2

Best results in major championships
- Masters Tournament: DNP
- PGA Championship: DNP
- U.S. Open: DNP
- The Open Championship: T13: 1934

Edward William George Jarman (2 July 1907 – 9 May 2003) was an English professional golfer. He played in the 1935 Ryder Cup.

Jarman had four brothers who were also professional golfers, elder brothers Fred, Jack and Tom and younger brother Bob.

== Professional wins ==
- 1933 Leeds Cup
- 1936 Leeds Cup

== Results in major championships ==
Tournament	1930	1931	1932	1933	1934	1935	1936	1937	1938	1939
The Open Championship	T36		T39		T13	T59	T44		CUT	

Tournament	1940	1941	1942	1943	1944	1945	1946	1947	1948	1949
The Open Championship	NT	NT	NT	NT	NT	NT				CUT

Note: Jarman only played in The Open Championship.

Did not play

NT = No tournament
CUT = missed the half-way cut
"T" indicates a tie for a place

== Team appearances ==
- Ryder Cup (representing Great Britain): 1935
- England–Scotland Professional Match (representing England): 1935 (winners)
