= Bill Cox (golfer) =

English golfer (1910–1985)

Personal information
- Full name: James Alfred Cox
- Nationality: England
- Born: 18 March 1910 Chalfont St Giles, Buckinghamshire, England
- Died: 3 December 1985 (aged 75) Copthorne, West Sussex, England

Career
- Sport: Golf
- Status: Professional
- Professional wins: 1

Best results in major championships
- Masters Tournament: DNP
- PGA Championship: DNP
- U.S. Open: DNP
- The Open Championship: T8: 1938

James Alfred 'Bill' Cox OBE (18 March 1910 – 3 December 1985) was an English professional golfer. In golfing publications his full name was given as William James Cox. He was in the British Ryder Cup teams in 1935 and 1937 and tied for 8th place in the 1938 Open Championship. After World War II he became a commentator on BBC Television.

== Golf career ==
Cox played on the British Ryder Cup teams in 1935 and 1937. He was tied for the lead after two rounds in the 1936 Open Championship but a third-round 79 dropped him down the field and he finished tied for 12th place. In the 1938 Open he finished tied for 8th place, his best finish. In 1939 he finished tied for second place in the News Chronicle Tournament.

In 1946 he became the professional Fulwell Golf Club where he remained until 1975.

He was awarded the OBE in the 1967 Birthday Honours "for services to golf".

== Broadcasting career ==
After World War II Cox was a frequent broadcaster on BBC Television, generally as a commentator with Henry Longhurst. He was replaced by Peter Alliss in 1969.

== Professional wins ==
- 1951 Daily Telegraph Foursomes Tournament (with Walter McLeod)

== Results in major championships ==
Tournament	1935	1936	1937	1938	1939	1940	1941	1942	1943	1944	1945	1946	1947	1948	1949	1950
The Open Championship	T12	T12	T21	T8	CUT	NT	NT	NT	NT	NT	NT	CUT	CUT		CUT	CUT

Note: Cox only played in The Open Championship.

Top 10
Did not play

NT = No tournament
CUT = missed the half-way cut
"T" indicates a tie for a place

== Team appearances ==
- Ryder Cup (representing Great Britain): 1935, 1937
- England–Scotland Professional Match (representing England): 1935 (winners), 1936 (winners), 1937 (winners)
- Coronation Match (representing the Ladies and Professionals): 1937
