= Midland Open =

Tournament information
- Location: English Midlands
- Established: 1923
- Format: Stroke-play

Current champion
- Matthew Cort

The Midland Open is an annual golf tournament played in the English Midlands. The event is currently organised by the Midlands Region of the Professional Golfers' Association.

== History ==
The Midland Professional Golf Club held its first meeting in December 1897. The club held its first championship on 12 May 1898. However the week before, on 3 May, a match was organised at the Coventry club at Whitley Common, between the club and a team of amateurs. The match was played at the Coventry club until 1902, after which it was played at a number of courses. The amateurs won in 1904 at Sandwell Park, but otherwise the professionals were successful, usually by a large margin.

In 1923, the Midland Counties Golf Association agreed to the creation of a new event, involving both amateur and professionals playing individually on level terms. The competition was played the day after the annual amateurs v. professionals match, at the same course, Little Aston. The competitors were the first 25 professionals from the Midland Professional Championship and the leading 15 from the Midland Amateur Championship. Both of these were 36-hole stroke-play events played in a single day, and the new tournament took the same form. Prizes amounting to nearly £100 were given by the Birmingham Gazette. The leading three amateurs received gold medals while there were cash prizes for the leading eight professionals.

Dick Wheildon won the first event in 1923 with Carl Bretherton the leading amateur, tied for 10th place. Michael Bingham won 1924 with Bretherton again the leading amateur, tied for 7th place. There was amateur winner in 1925, Robert Humphries winning by four strokes from George Buckle who took the first prize as the leading professional. Tom Williamson won in 1926 with Bretherton again the leading amateur. In 1927 the field was expanded with the leading 30 professionals and 20 amateurs qualifying. With a number of qualifying amateurs was later increased to 25. The 1930 event was won by an amateur, William Tweddell who had won the Amateur Championship earlier in the year. Tom Williamson was the leading professional. Jim Morris won in 1928 with Stanley Lunt the leading amateur.

In 1929 the order of the Midland Professional Championship and the Midland Challenge Cup was changed, with the championship played earlier in the year and the challenge cup moving to September and becoming the qualifying event for the professionals. Tom Barber won by four strokes, having won the Midland Challenge Cup earlier in the month. In 1930 Michael Bingham became the first player to win the event twice, finishing three strokes ahead of the amateur Eric Fiddian. There was tie in 1931 between Tom Barber and Tom Williamson. There was no playoff and the title was shared. Bert Gadd was another multiple winner, winning in 1934 and 1935. He was followed by the amateur Charlie Stowe who won in 1936 and 1937. Max Faulkner won in 1938 during his break spell as the professional at Leamington Spa. The qualifying events for the 1939 tournament had been held but the Midland Open planned for September was cancelled because of the start of World War II.

The event was revived in 1947 with a new trophy and prize money provided by the Birmingham Post & Mail Ltd. The format remained the same as in the pre-war period, the professionals qualifying through the Midland section of the News of the World Match Play in September. Walter Lees won the event, a stroke ahead of Jack Hargreaves. Bert Williamson won in 1948 with a record low score of 136. 1949 saw the start of a new event, the Midland Amateur-Professional Foursomes, a three-day match-play tournament, also sponsored by the Birmingham Post & Mail. The Midland Open was moved from its late-season date to July with the new foursomes event played immediately after, at the same course. Qualification for the professionals was based on the Midland Professional Championship, held in May. Charlie Ward won the Midland Open by six strokes with a new record of 135, his first win in the event.

There was an amateur success in 1950, with John Llewellyn Morgan winning the event. Charlie Ward, the 1949 winner, won again in 1951, 1952 and 1954, with Frank Miller winning in 1953. There was a three-way tie in 1955 between Frank Jowle, Peter Butler and Jack Hargreaves. There was a 36-hole playoff the following Monday after the foursomes event. Jowle won with a score of 141, with Hargreaves scoring 142 and Butler 144. Butler won in 1956, 1958 and 1960, with Ward having his fifth win 1957 and David Snell in 1959. In 1959 the Midland Challenge Cup was used as the qualifying event for the professionals but the championship was again used from 1960. Snell had a final round of 63 in 1959 to set a new record total of 134.

From 1961 to 1963 the Midland open was played after the Midland Amateur-Professional Foursomes. In 1964 the foursomes became a 54-hole stroke-play event and was again played after the open. From 1968 to 1971 the Midland open was a 54-hole event with the foursomes being reduced to 36-holes. With only a single round played on the first day, followed by a cut, qualification through the professional championship was no longer needed. The Midland Amateur-Professional Foursomes was last held in 1971. In 1961 Ralph Moffitt had a first round of 61 and went on to win the tournament with a record total of 130, 11 strokes ahead of anyone else. Moffitt won again in 1964 and 1970. Peter Butler had his fourth and fifth wins in 1965 and 1969, while David Snell won for the second time in 1966. In 1967 56-year-old Tom Collinge won on his home course at Olton.

From 1972 to 1974 the Midland open was again played as a one-day 36-hole event with qualification for professionals through the Midland Professional Championship. However from 1975 it was held over two days, allowing a much larger field. Brian Waites, the 1971 winner, won again in 1976 and 1981. There was an amateur winner in 1973, Keith Hodgkinson, the first since 1950, and he was soon followed by Sandy Lyle who won in 1975 after an 18-hole playoff against Brian Waites. The Welsh professional Andy Griffiths won twice, in 1978 and 1980. In 1982 the championship was turned into a 72-hole event called the Midland All Stars Championship, but struggled for sponsorship and was dropped after the 1983 season.

== Winners ==
Year	Winner	Score	Margin of victory	Runner(s)-up	Venue	Ref
Midland Amateur and Professional Tournament
1923	(England) Dick Wheildon	148	3 strokes	(England) Len Holland	Little Aston	
1924	(Republic of Ireland) Michael Bingham	144	1 stroke	(Scotland) Ted Douglas	Moseley	
1925	(England) Robert Humphries (a)	141	4 strokes	(England) George Buckle	Copt Heath	
1926	(England) Tom Williamson	142	2 strokes	(England) Tom Barber	Handsworth	
1927	(England) William Tweddell (a)	146	3 strokes	(England) Tom Williamson	Blackwell	
1928	(England) Jim Morris	146	1 stroke	(England) Jack Bloxham	Sandwell Park	
1929	(England) Tom Barber	144	4 strokes	(England) John Beddard (a) (Republic of Ireland) Michael Bingham	Finham Park	
1930	(Republic of Ireland) Michael Bingham	139	3 strokes	(England) Eric Fiddian (a)	Stourbridge	
1931	(England) Tom Barber (England) Tom Williamson	141	Tied		Olton	
1932	(England) Frank Weston	140	5 strokes	(England) Charlie Ward	Sutton Coldfield	
1933	(England) George Buckle	142	2 strokes	(England) William Button	Harborne	
1934	(England) Bert Gadd	145	1 stroke	(England) Tom Richards (England) Charlie Ward (England) Tom Williamson	Castle Bromwich	
1935	(England) Bert Gadd	137	6 strokes	(England) Bill Martin	Little Aston	
1936	(England) Charlie Stowe (a)	137	3 strokes	(England) Bill Branch (England) Arthur Lees	South Staffordshire	
1937	(England) Charlie Stowe (a)	137	1 stroke	(England) Bill Martin	Sandwell Park	
1938	(England) Max Faulkner	143	1 stroke	(England) George Johnson (England) Bob Pemberton	Moseley	
1939–1946: No tournament
Midland Open Championship
1947	(England) Walter Lees	141	1 stroke	(England) Jack Hargreaves	Sutton Coldfield	
1948	(England) Bert Williamson	136	2 strokes	(England) George Johnson (England) Charlie Ward (England) George White	Blackwell	
1949	(England) Charlie Ward	135	6 strokes	(England) George Johnson (England) Norman Roffe	Sutton Coldfield	
1950	(Wales) John Llewellyn Morgan (a)	143	1 stroke	(England) George Johnson	Little Aston	
1951	(England) Charlie Ward	136	3 strokes	(Scotland) Jack McMillan	Sandwell Park	
1952	(England) Charlie Ward	139	3 strokes	(England) Bernard Hunt	Moor Hall	
1953	(England) Frank Miller	140	3 strokes	(England) Bill Firkins	Blackwell	
1954	(England) Charlie Ward	140	1 stroke	(England) Jack Cawsey	Sutton Coldfield	
1955	(England) Frank Jowle	137	Playoff (Note: Jowle won a 36-hole playoff, played six days later. He scored 141, Hargreaves 142 and Butler 144.)	(England) Peter Butler (England) Jack Hargreaves	Moseley	
1956	(England) Peter Butler	139	3 strokes	(England) Frank Jowle (England) Frank Miller (England) Charlie Ward	Sandwell Park	
1957	(England) Charlie Ward	141	2 strokes	(England) Bob Hastelow	Little Aston	
1958	(England) Peter Butler	140	1 stroke	(England) Jack Hargreaves	Olton	
1959	(England) David Snell	134	2 strokes	(England) Jack Hargreaves	Moor Hall	
1960	(England) Peter Butler	139	1 stroke	(England) Ron Moses	Sutton Coldfield	
1961	(England) Ralph Moffitt	130	11 strokes	(England) Tom Collinge (England) John Goodwin (England) Frank Miller	Blackwell	
1962	(England) George Maisey Jr.	141	Playoff (Note: Maisey won a 36-hole playoff, played ten days later, 145 to 148.)	(England) Harley Roberts (a)	Handsworth	
1963	(England) Tony Rees	142	1 stroke	(England) Charlie Ward	Copt Heath	
1964	(England) Ralph Moffitt	142	Playoff (Note: Moffitt won an 18-hole playoff, played three months later, 66 to 68.)	(England) Peter Butler	Little Aston	
1965	(England) Peter Butler	144	2 strokes	(England) Richard Livingston (England) John Miller	Sandwell Park	
1966	(England) David Snell	139	3 strokes	(England) David Astill	Blackwell	
1967	(England) Tom Collinge	137	2 strokes	(England) Geoff Marks (a)	Olton	
1968	(Northern Ireland) Les Thompson	217	1 stroke	(England) Alan Smith (a) (England) Charlie Ward	Little Aston	
1969	(England) Peter Butler	210	2 strokes	(England) Maurice Bembridge (England) Bill Firkins Jr (England) Frank Miller	Blackwell	
1970	(England) Ralph Moffitt	210	Playoff (Note: Moffitt won an 18-hole playoff, played two months later, 67 to 77.)	(England) Nick Underwood	Olton	
1971	(England) Brian Waites	205	3 strokes	(England) Paul Herbert	Blackwell	
1972	(England) Richard Livingston	141	1 stroke	(England) Brian Waites	Little Aston	
1973	(England) Keith Hodgkinson (a)	142	1 stroke	(Republic of Ireland) Eamonn Darcy (England) Nick Underwood (England) Charlie Ward	Olton	
1974	(England) Jim Rhodes	146	1 stroke	(England) Nick Underwood	Sandwell Park	
1975	(England) Sandy Lyle (a)	137	Playoff (Note: Lyle won an 18-hole playoff, played six weeks later, 73 to 76.)	(England) Brian Waites	Walsall	
1976	(England) Brian Waites	136	9 strokes	(England) Paul Herbert (Wales) David Llewellyn	Hill Valley	
1977	(England) John Anderson	144	Playoff (Note: Anderson won with a birdie at the first extra hole.)	(England) Andy Bownes (Republic of Ireland) Hugh Boyle	Hill Valley	
1978	(Wales) Andy Griffiths	136	7 strokes	(England) Brian Waites	Hill Valley	
1979	(England) David Ridley	144	Playoff (Note: Ridley won with a par at the first extra hole.)	(England) Phil Weaver	Redditch	
1980	(Wales) Andy Griffiths	146	Playoff (Note: Griffiths won with a birdie at the third extra hole.)	(England) Pete Cowen	Forest of Arden	
1981	(England) Brian Waites	136	4 strokes	(England) Pete Cowen	Forest of Arden	
Midland All Stars Championship
1982	(England) Tony Minshall	288	1 stroke	(England) Alan Roach (a)	Forest of Arden	
1983	(England) David J. Russell	286	2 strokes	(England) David Thorp	Purley Chase	
1984–1991: Not held
Midland Open
1992	(Scotland) Gary Collinson	287	1 stroke	(England) Simon Wood	The Vale	
1993	(England) Gary Emerson	281	1 stroke	(England) Chris Hall	The Vale	
1994	(England) Steve Webster (a)	205	1 stroke	(England) Stephen Bennett	Kilworth Springs	
1995	(England) Steve Russell	201	3 strokes	(England) James Cook (England) Joe Higgins	Welcombe	
1996	(England) Matt Stanford	270	1 stroke	(England) Stewart Cronin	Staberton Park	
1997–2002: Not held

- 2003 Darren Prosser
- 2004 Phil Edwards
- 2005 Darren Prosser
- 2006 Paul Streeter
- 2007 Matt Morris
- 2008 Cameron Clark
- 2009 Not held
- 2010 Simon Lilly
- 2011 James Whatley
- 2012 Lee Clarke
- 2013 Matthew Cort
- 2014 Matthew Cort
- 2015 Peter Baker
- 2016 Matthew Cort
- 2017 Michael Reed
- 2018–2019 Not held
- 2020 Matthew Cort
- 2021 Paul Streeter
- 2022 Sam Forgan
- 2023 Matthew Cort
- 2024 Matthew Cort

Additional source:
