= Midland Challenge Cup =

Tournament information
- Location: English Midlands
- Established: 1903
- Format: Stroke-play
- Final year: 1961

The Midland Challenge Cup was an annual professional golf tournament played in the English Midlands. The event was organised by the Midlands Region of the Professional Golfers' Association and ran from 1903 to 1961. For most of its existence it acted as the Midland section qualifying event for the News of the World Match Play. Sectional qualification was discontinued after 1961 and the event was not held again.

== History ==
The Midland Professional Golf Club held its first meeting in late 1897. Initially four tournaments were held each year, one being a championship. The first championship was held in May 1898. However, in 1900 the schedule was reduced to two, a championship meeting in April and an open meeting in October, open to professionals from outside the Midland region. the first open event, at Sandwell Park, was won by Robert Munro. There was another open meeting at Olton in 1901, won by James Sherlock. In 1902 the Midland Professional Golf Club amalgamated with the Professional Golfers' Association, which had been formed in 1901, becoming the Midland section of the PGA. The 1902 open tournament saw Harry Vardon, JH Taylor, and James Braid competing and was won by JH Taylor.

In 1902 the Midland Counties Competition, an organisation that ran some important amateur competitions in the Midlands and a predecessor of the current Midland Golf Union, passed a resolution recommending that clubs in the region subscribe a maximum of two guineas towards prize money in the two Midland professional tournaments. Some of the money raised was used to purchase a new trophy, the "Midland Challenge Cup", which was first awarded at the 1903 open meeting at Hollinwell. The first News of the World Match Play tournament was also held in 1903. Each section was allocated a number of places in the final stage, the Midland section having 5 of the 32 places. The open event acted as the qualifying event, the leading five midland players progressing to the final stage. The tournament was a 36-hole stroke-play event, contested in a single day. Tom Williamson won, four strokes ahead of James Sherlock.

The same system was used for a number of years. The Midland Professional Championship was held in April with the open event played in September, at which the Midland Challenge Cup was awarded and places for the midland golfers in the final stage of the News of the World Match Play. Sandy Herd won the Midland Challenge Cup in 1904, six strokes ahead of George Cawsey, the leading midland player. Tom Williamson won for the second time in 1905 with George Cawsey winning in 1906. Philip Wynne won in 1907 with George Coburn the leading midland golfer. In 1907 the number of News of the World qualifiers was reduced to four. Coburn won in 1908. 1909 produced the first tie in the event, between Charles Mayo and Wilfrid Reid. The pair played another nine holes in the evening, Mayo winning by two strokes. Frank Coltart tied for third place and was the leading midland player. 1910 produced another tie, between two midland players George Tuck and William Jeffries. As in 1909 a 9-hole playoff was arranged, Tuck winning by several strokes.

1911 saw the introduction of a second event for which was sectional qualification was required. the Sphere and Tatler Foursomes Tournament. Qualification was based on individual stroke-play, qualifiers being drawn randomly into pairs for the finals stage. The Midland section was allocated 9 of the 64 places. The Midland section took the opportunity to switch the events; the Midland Challenge Cup being played as an open event in April, serving as the qualifying for the Sphere and Tatler Foursomes in May, while the championship was held in the autumn and acted as qualification for the News of the World Match Play, for which five places were now available. The reversal of the events caused some confusion in the press. Wilfrid Reid won the event three years in a row from 1911 to 1913. In 1911 he finished two strokes ahead of Jack Oke while in 1912 he was a stroke ahead of Tom Williamson. In 1913 he was tied with Laurie Ayton Snr but won the 18-hole playoff the following day by five strokes. Tom Williamson won in 1914. He was tied with Jack B. Ross but won the playoff the next day by six strokes,

In May 1919 the Midland section held a "Victory Tournament". Tom Williamson tied with Archie Compston after the 36 holes and they were still tied after a further nine holes. Williamson won after a further nine holes were player.

Although the Sphere and Tatler Foursomes was not revived after the war, another event, the 72-hole Daily Mail Tournament, replaced it in the calendar and also involved sectional qualifying. The Midland Challenge Cup continued to be played in April acting as the qualification event for the Daily Mail tournament. At Hollinwell in 1920 the cup was won by Hugh Roberts, a stroke ahead of Tom Williamson. Len Holland won in 1921, beating Arthur Ham and Alfred Matthews in an 18-hole playoff. From 1922 to 1924 there were big wins, James Adwick winnin9g by five strokes in 1922, Michael Bingham by four in 1923 and Holland by five in 1924. Williamson won three times in a row from 1925 to 1927, each time by one stroke.

The Daily Mail Tournament was not played from 1928 to 1935 and the opportunity was taken to separate the News of the World Match Play qualifying from the championship. The Midland Challenge Cup was awarded to the winner of the News of the World qualifying event, as was the case before 1911. The number of qualification places for the News of the World event varied from year to year but in this period was either 9 or 10. In 1928 this was held in June with the championship in September but from 1929 the order was reversed, with the championship played in the early part of the year and the News of the World qualifying in September. Tom Barber won the cup in 1928, after a playoff against Charles Pixton, and retained it the following year. There were two multiple winners in the 1930, Bill Martin winning in 1934 and 1935, while Jack McMillan won in 1936 and 1939.

In early 1940 the cup was awarded to the leading qualifier in the Midland section of the Daily Mail Tournament, and was won by Tom Haliburton. For a number of year the winner of the cup was not widely reported but it seems that was also given to leading Midland qualifier in the Daily Mail event in 1949 and 1950, the last two year of that tournament. From 1951 it was awarded again awarded to the winner of the News of the World Match Play qualification event. From 1956 the Midland Professional Championship and the Midland Challenge Cup were played on successive days at the same venue. Ralph Moffitt won the Midland Challenge Cup three times, in 1954, 1956 and 1960. In 1956 the winner of the event was Alex Tibbles, then working in Peru. He was not eligible to win the Midland Challenge Cup, which was won by Moffitt, the runner-up in the event. Frank Jowle was another multiple winner, winning in 1955 and 1959. George Maisey was final winner of the event, winning in 1961. From 1962 sectional qualification for the News of the World championship was replaced by local qualifying on the two days prior to the knock-out stage.

In 1980 the cup was reused as the trophy for the Midland Matchplay Championship which had started in 1972 and ran until 1999.

== Winners ==
Year	Winner	Score	Margin of victory	Runner(s)-up	Venue	Ref
Midland Challenge Cup
1903	(England) Tom Williamson	151	4 strokes	(England) James Sherlock	Hollinwell	
1904	(Scotland) Sandy Herd	146	6 strokes	(England) George Cawsey	Sandwell Park	
1905	(England) Tom Williamson	145	1 stroke	(England) John Hutchings	Kings Norton	
1906	(England) George Cawsey	152	1 stroke	(England) Harry Cawsey (England) Jack Oke	Handsworth	
1907	(Ireland) Philip Wynne	146	3 strokes	(Scotland) George Coburn	Olton	
1908	(Scotland) George Coburn	148	1 stroke	(England) George Cawkwell	Streetly	
1909	(England) Charles Mayo	149	Playoff (Note: Mayo beat Reid 40 to 42 in a 9-hole playoff, played the same evening.)	(England) Wilfrid Reid	Kings Norton	
1910	(England) George Tuck	146	Playoff (Note: Tuck beat Jeffries in a 9-hole playoff, played the same evening.)	(England) William Jeffries	Castle Bromwich	
1911	(England) Wilfrid Reid	153	2 strokes	(England) Jack Oke	Harborne	
1912	(England) Wilfrid Reid	148	1 stroke	(England) Tom Williamson	Hallowes	
1913	(England) Wilfrid Reid	150	Playoff (Note: Reid beat Ayton 75 to 80 in an 18-hole playoff, played the following day.)	(Scotland) Laurie Ayton Snr	Walmley	
1914	(England) Tom Williamson	148	Playoff (Note: Williamson beat Ross 74 to 80 in an 18-hole playoff, played the following day.)	(Scotland) Jack B. Ross	Northampton County	
1915–1918: No tournament
PGA Midland Section Victory Tournament
1919	(England) Tom Williamson	152	Playoff (Note: Williamson and Compston were tied after a further 9 holes and played another 9, Williamson winning 77 to 79 for the 18-holes, played the same evening.)	(England) Archie Compston	Castle Bromwich	
Midland Challenge Cup
1920	(England) Hugh Roberts	156	1 stroke	(England) Tom Williamson	Hollinwell	
1921	(England) Len Holland	150	Playoff (Note: Holland won an 18-hole playoff, played the following day, scoring 72 to Ham and Matthews 75s.)	(England) Arthur Ham (England) Alfred Matthews	North Shore	
1922	(England) James Adwick	149	5 strokes	W.J. King	Burton-on-Trent	
1923	(England) Michael Bingham	144	4 strokes	(Scotland) Ted Douglas (England) Willie Robertson (England) Frank Weston	Coventry	
1924	(England) Len Holland	146	5 strokes	(England) Cecil Hobley	Sherwood Forest	
1925	(England) Tom Williamson	149	1 stroke	(England) James Adwick (Scotland) Ted Douglas	Leek	
1926	(England) Tom Williamson	144	1 stroke	(England) Harry Walker	Sandwell Park	
1927	(England) Tom Williamson	156	1 stroke	(England) Tom Barber (England) George Buckle (England) Ken Hooker (England) Jim Morris	Hollinwell	
1928	(England) Tom Barber	150	Playoff (Note: Barber beat Pixton 76 to 81 in an 18-hole playoff.)	(England) Charles Pixton	Little Aston	
1929	(England) Tom Barber	145	1 stroke	(England) Freddie Beck	Sherwood Forest	
1930	(England) Frank Weston	145	Playoff (Note: Weston beat Seager 71 to 74 in an 18-hole playoff.)	(England) Jack Seager	Birstall	
1931	(England) Bill Firkins	140	Playoff (Note: Firkins beat Matthews 76 to 79 in an 18-hole playoff.)	(England) Alfred Matthews	Walmley	
1932	(England) George Buckle	145	1 stroke	(Wales) Tom Green	Harborne	
1933	(Wales) Tom Green	143	1 stroke	(England) Ernest Cawsey	Burnham Beeches	
1934	(England) Bill Martin	134	10 strokes	(England) George Buckle	Hollinwell	
1935	(England) Bill Martin	140	1 stroke	(England) Charlie Ward	Copt Heath	
1936	(Scotland) Jack McMillan	139	3 strokes	(England) George Buckle	Handsworth	
1937	(England) Ken Hooker	137	Playoff (Note: Hooker beat Buckle 69 to 74 in an 18-hole playoff.)	(England) George Buckle	Copt Heath	
1938	(England) George Johnson	141	1 stroke	(England) Bill Branch	Leicestershire	
1939	(Scotland) Jack McMillan	138	2 strokes	(England) Bob Pemberton	Moseley	
1940–1945: No tournament
1946	(Scotland) Tom Haliburton	152	4 strokes	(England) Herbert Manton (England) Charlie Ward	Little Aston	
1947	Not known					
1948	Not known					
1949	(England) Norman Roffe	140	3 strokes	(England) Freddie Beck (England) Charlie Ward (England) Bert Williamson	Cotswold Hills	
1950	(England) Jack Seager	146	2 strokes	(England) Jack Hargreaves (England) Alex Tibbles (England) Bert Williamson	Woodhall Spa	
1951	(England) Bert Williamson	138	2 strokes	(England) Jack Green	Abbeydale	
1952	(England) Bernard Hunt	142	2 strokes	(England) Henry Coleman	South Staffordshire	
1953	(England) Jack Hargreaves	140	1 stroke	(England) George Johnson	Sherwood Forest	
1954	(England) Ralph Moffitt	137	4 strokes	(England) Norman Roffe	Finham Park	
1955	(England) Frank Jowle	134	5 strokes	(England) Charlie Ward	Copt Heath	
1956	(England) Alex Tibbles (Note: Tibbles won the event but Moffitt won the Midland Challenge Cup since Tibbles was working overseas and hence ineligible.)	140	3 strokes	(England) Ralph Moffitt	Walsall	
1957	(England) David Snell	151	3 strokes	(England) Jack Hargreaves	Seacroft	
1958	(England) Charlie Ward	136	5 strokes	(England) Peter Butler	Hawkstone Park	
1959	(England) Frank Jowle	141	2 strokes	(England) Peter Butler	Luffenham Heath	
1960	(England) Ralph Moffitt	140	2 strokes	(England) Peter Butler (England) Ron Moses (England) Charlie Ward	Ladbrook Park	
1961	(England) George Maisey	139	1 stroke	(England) Peter Butler	Hawkstone Park	

From 1903 to 1910, from 1928 to 1939 and from 1951 to 1961 it was the Midland section qualifying event for the News of the World Matchplay. From 1911 to 1914 it was the qualifying event for the Sphere and Tatler Foursomes Tournament. From 1920 to 1927 and in 1946, 1949 and 1950 it was the qualifying event for the Daily Mail Tournament.
