= Glasgow Herald Tournament =

Tournament information
- Location: Auchterarder, Scotland
- Established: 1920
- Course(s): Gleneagles Hotel, King's Course
- Length: 6,350 yards (5,810 m)
- Final year: 1927

Final champion
- Charles Whitcombe

The Glasgow Herald Tournament (also known as the Gleneagles Tournament) was a British golf tournament played at Gleneagles from 1920 to 1927. The 1920 event had prize money of £650, then the largest ever in a British tournament. From 1921 the prize money was increased further, to 1,000 guineas (£1,050), a new record. The first prize increased from £160 to £200. From 1921 the event was often called the Glasgow Herald 1000 Guineas Tournament.

The tournament had an initial stroke play qualification followed by knock-out match play.

The first international match between Great Britain and the United States was played at Gleneagles on 6 June 1921, the day before the start of the 1921 event.

Although Gleneagles was open for golf in 1919, the Gleneagles Hotel was not opened until June 1924, just prior to the 1924 event.

== History ==
=== 1920 ===
The 1920 event was played from 24–27 May. 104 professionals played 36 holes of qualifying on the first two days. The leading 16 players then played knock-out match-play on the following two days with £500 prize money. Players outside the top 16 were eligible for a 36-hole consolation event on the final two days with £115 prize money.

Ted Ray won the qualifying stage with a score of 151, taking a £25 prize. Abe Mitchell, with a 71, led after the first day but had an 81 on the second day and finished second in the qualifying. Three players tied on 162 for 16th place and played an extra nine holes. Harry Vardon won the playoff with a score of 40. George Duncan won the tournament, beating Arnaud Massy 3&2 and taking the £160 first prize, "the largest individual amount that has ever been offered in a professional golf tournament". In the 18-hole final Duncan was 5 up at the turn. Massy reduced the lead to 2 with four holes to play but Duncan won the 15th and halved the 16th. Mitchell's 71 on the first day remained the best stroke-play round of the week and he collected a further £10 prize.

=== 1921 ===
The tournament was extended to a fifth day for 1921, play being from 7–11 June. 27 holes were played on the two qualifying days using both the King's Course and the 9-hole Queen's course. As in 1920 the leading 16 players qualified for the match play stage but the semi-finals and finals were extended to 36 holes. The 36-hole consolation event took place on the third and fourth days with a separate amateur event on the final day, a Saturday. £740 prize money was available for the 16 qualifiers, the winner receiving £200. The total prize money for the consolation event was £165 with £25 to the winner. There was a £20 for the best round over the King's course, £10 for the best on the Queen's course and £25 for the winner of the qualifying event. The King's course was changed from that used in 1920 with the original 11th and 12th replaced by two short holes, shortening the course to 6,125 yards. The Queen's course measured 2,505 yards.

Ted Ray won the qualifying stage again with a score of 212, taking the £25 prize. 16 players scored 222 or better and advanced to the match play stage. The 16 included three Americans, Jock Hutchison, Walter Hagen and Emmet French, together with the Australian Joe Kirkwood Sr. All three Americans lost on the first day of the match play. Hutchison lost to Abe Mitchell while French lost to Ray. Hagen won his first round match but lost to Thomas Renouf in the afternoon. Mitchell met Kirkwood in the final. Mitchell led by four holes after the morning round and won easily 7&6.

=== 1922 ===
The 1922 tournament was played from 6–10 June. 18 holes were played on the two qualifying days on the King's Course. The leading 32 players now qualified for the matchplay stage with just the final played over 36 holes. The 36-hole consolation event took place on the third day. £880 prize money was available for the 32 qualifiers, the winner receiving £200. The total prize money for the consolation event was £95 with £15 to the winner. There was £25 for the winner of the qualifying event and a £20 for the best stroke play round.

Joe Kirkwood Sr. led the qualifying with rounds of 71 and 73. There was a three-way tie on 158 for the 32nd place. There was 6-hole playoff with Jack Ross taking the final place. Abe Mitchell met Ted Ray in the final. Ray led by three after 11 holes of the morning round, but Mitchell finished well to level the match at lunch. Mitchell took a three hole lead after the first nine holes of the afternoon round and eventually won 2&1, his second successive win in the tournament.

=== 1923 ===
The tournament was played from 19–23 June. Rowland Jones and George Oke led the qualifying on 143 and shared the £25 prize. Six players tied on 154 for two remaining places. there was a six-hole playoff with Arthur Butchart and Tom Williamson advancing to the match play stage. Arthur Havers met Frank Ball in the final, played in a strong wind. Havers led by two holes after the morning, both playing poorly. The match was decided in the early holes of the second round. Havers won the first and then four holes in a row from the fourth, to go 7 up. Ball won the 8th and the 12th but Havers won easily, 6&5. Havers had won the Open Championship the previous week.

=== 1924 ===
The tournaments was played from 10–14 June. Ted Ray had two rounds of 72 to lead the qualifying, a stroke ahead of Ángel de la Torre. Seven players tied on 152 and played a six-hole playoff for six places. James Ockenden took 29 for the six holes, including a 7, and missed out; George Duncan being one of the six who qualified. Two of the leading British golfers, George Duncan and Abe Mitchell contested the final. Duncan played exceptionally well, scoring 66 in the morning round to be 5 up. He continued this form into the afternoon, winning the first and fourth holes to go 7 up. The match ended at the 11th with Duncan winning 8&7.

=== 1925 ===
The tournament was played from 30 June–4 July. Abe Mitchell led the qualifying on 140 four ahead of Aubrey Boomer. Seven golfers tied on 154 and played off for two remaining places. After a six-hole playoff, three were still tied and they contested a further six-hold playoff, after which Harry Swain and George Buckle qualified, Mitchell met Archie Compston in the final. Mitchell continued his good form and led by 4 holes after the morning round and extended this 5 after winning the second hole after lunch. The match then changed dramatically with Mitchell losing form and Compston winning 7 of the next 8 holes to lead by two hole after the 10th. Mitchell then recovered, winning the 12th and 15th to square the match. Mitchell drove into a bunker at the 17th and lost the hole. At the last Compston's second shot was over the green but was stopped by the crowd. Compston was able to chip close and halve the hole in 4, to win the match by one hole.

=== 1926 ===
The tournament was played from 29 June–3 July. George Duncan led the qualifying on 139, two clear of Bill Davies. Five players tied on 152 for three places. Freddie Beck, José Jurado and David Millar making it through the six-hole playoff. Aubrey Boomer met Lewis Herrington in the final. Boomer was well known, having won a number of continental open championships and the Daily Mail Tournament early in the year. Herrington, by contrast, was a relatively unknown Yorkshire golfer. He had beaten Stewart Burns and George Duncan in close matches on the first day of the match play and then Mark Seymour and Thomas Renouf to reach the final. Herrington won the first two holes of the final but Boomer had levelled by the sixth and was four up after the morning round. The afternoon round was close until Boomer won three holes in a row from the 9th to be dormie 7. Herrington won the 12th but the match ended at the next with Boomer winning 7&5.

=== 1927 ===
The tournament was played from 19–23 July. Bill Mehlhorn won the qualifying win a score of 140, two ahead of Tom Barber and Archie Compston. Ten players tied on 154 for six places. The ten played a six-hole playoff and, after a further tie, four of these played another six holes before the playoff was decided. Charles Whitcombe met 50-year-old Ted Ray in the final. The match was very one-sided with Whitcombe 5-up at lunch. After 8 holes of the afternoon round Whitcombe was dormie-10. Ray won the 9th but Whitcombe won the 10th to win 10&8. The 36-hole consolation event was played on the Queen's course.

In late 1927 it was announced that there would be no tournament in 1928. The tournament was not played again.

== Winners ==
Year	Winner	Country	Margin of victory	Runner-up	Winner's share (£)	Ref
1920	George Duncan	Scotland	3 & 2	(France) Arnaud Massy	160	
1921	Abe Mitchell	England	7 & 6	(Australia) Joe Kirkwood, Sr.	200	
1922	Abe Mitchell	England	2 & 1	(Jersey) Ted Ray	200	
1923	Arthur Havers	England	6 & 5	(England) Frank Ball	200	
1924	George Duncan	Scotland	8 & 7	(England) Abe Mitchell	200	
1925	Archie Compston	England	1 up	(England) Abe Mitchell	200	
1926	Aubrey Boomer	Jersey	7 & 5	(England) Lewis Herrington	200	
1927	Charles Whitcombe	England	10 & 8	(Jersey) Ted Ray	200	

The 1920 final was over 18 holes. From 1921 the final was over 36 holes.
