= Midland Professional Championship =

Tournament information
- Location: English Midlands
- Established: 1898
- Format: Stroke-play

Current champion
- Daniel Whitby-Smith

The Midland Professional Championship is an annual golf tournament played in the English Midlands. The event is organised by the Midlands Region of the Professional Golfers' Association. It is the oldest tournament in professional golf having been first contested in 1898.

== History ==
The event was originally organised by the Midland Professional Golf Club, an early professional golfers' association. The club held its first meeting at Edgbaston golf club on 9 December 1897. A 36-hole stroke-play tournament was held, 25 professionals competing, followed by a business meeting at which officers were elected. Thomas Whare, the North Warwickshire professional, won with a score of 155, two strokes ahead of David Duncan and Frank Wingate. The initial plan was to hold four meetings a year. The second tournament was held at the Sutton Coldfield club in February 1898 and was won by Tom Williamson with a score of 162. At a meeting following the event it was decided to hold a Championship meeting at Harborne on 12 May, to be played over 54 holes.

The first championship meeting, in 1898, took an unusual form. There was a 36-hole tournament, which determined the distribution of the cash prizes. The leading 12 players then competed over a further 18 holes, the leading score over the 54 holes decided the championship with the runner-up also receiving a gold medal. The 36-hole stage was won by Sydney Wingate, with a score of 157, with Thomas Whare two strokes behind. A number of the leading 12 did not complete in the third round of the day. Wingate was paired with David Brown, the 1886 Open Champion, for the final round. Brown scored 35 for the first nine, to Wingate's 41, to lead by a stroke. Both took 41 for the second nine to give Brown a one stroke win over Wingate, with George Cawsey a further shot behind. Two further events were held in 1898, at Bulwell in August and at Olton in November. Harry Vardon was present at Olton and played a 9-hole foursomes after the tournament. Also at Olton, Edward Chance took over as president of the club.

The Midland Professional Golf Club again held four tournaments in 1899, in February at Kings Norton, in May at Sandwell Park, in September at Robin Hood and in November at Handsworth. The championship was contested at Sandwell Park but, unlike 1898, it was played as a 36-hole event like the other tournaments. Alfred Toogood won the championship. by a stroke from James Sherlock. In 1900 the schedule was reduced to two, a championship meeting in April and an open meeting in October, open to professionals from outside the Midland region. Tom Williamson won the championship, two strokes ahead of George Cawsey. The same format was used in 1901 with James Sherlock winning the championship, four strokes ahead of Cawsey.

In early 1902 the Midland Counties Competition, an organisation that ran some important amateur competitions in the Midlands and a predecessor of the current Midland Golf Union, passed a resolution recommending that clubs in the region subscribe a maximum of two guineas towards prize money in the two Midland professional tournaments. A sub-committee with Edward Chance as chairman, was created to organise the distribution of prize money. The initiative proved successful and helped fund the events. Also in 1902 the Midland Professional Golf Club amalgamated with the Professional Golfers' Association, which had been formed in 1901, becoming the Midland section of the PGA. Tom Williamson won the April event for a second time. The open autumn tournament saw Harry Vardon, JH Taylor, and James Braid competing and was won by JH Taylor.

The 1903 championship was won for a second time by James Sherlock, nine strokes ahead of the field. Sherlock was presented with a silver cup donated by Edward Chance. The "Chance Cup" became associated with the championship until the 1920s, although when it was first presented is unclear. 1903 also saw the first News of the World Match Play tournament, the first national event organised by the PGA. Each section was allocated a number of places in the final stage, the Midland section having 5 of the 32 places available. The autumn event acted as the qualifying event. A new trophy, the "Midland Challenge Cup", was purchased for the autumn competition.

Alfred Lewis won in 1904, a stroke ahead of James Sherlock. Tom Williamson and his brother Harry because of the sudden death of their mother. 1905 saw the first tie in the championship, between James Sherlock and Tom Williamson, both on 159. It was decided that the championship would be decided based on their performances at the autumn meeting. Williamson won the autumn tournament, thus winning both the Midland Challenge Cup and the Chance Cup. Sherlock and Williamson were absent from the 1906 championship and the tournament was won by Jack Fulford. Williamson won the championship in 1907 and 1909 and was runner-up to George Cawsey in 1908. Edward Veness won in 1910, ahead of Jack Oke, with Williamson in third place.

1911 saw the introduction of a second event for which sectional qualification was required. the Sphere and Tatler Foursomes Tournament. Qualification was based on individual stroke-play, qualifiers being drawn randomly into pairs for the finals stage. The Midland section was allocated 9 of the 64 places. The Midland section took the opportunity to switch the events; the Midland Challenge Cup being played as an open event in April, serving as the qualifying for the Sphere and Tatler Foursomes in May, while the championship and Chance Cup were played as a closed event in the autumn and acted as qualification for the News of the World Match Play. The reversal of the events caused some confusion in the press. Tom Williamson won the championship. The 1912 championship resulted in a tie between George Buckle and Harry Cawsey. They had a playoff the following morning but were still tied after both scored 76. They then played a further 18 holes in the afternoon which Buckle won, scoring 79 and Cawsey's 82. George Tuck won the championship in 1913 while the 1914 tournament was cancelled for the start of World War I.

The championship restarted in 1919, acting again as qualification for the News of the World Match Play. 10 places were available instead of the pre-war 5, the main event have been extended from 32 players to 64. Bert Weastell and Len Holland tied on 149, Weastell winning the 9-hole playoff, played the same evening. Although the Sphere and Tatler Foursomes was not revived after the war, another event, the Daily Mail Tournament, replaced it in the calendar and also involved sectional qualifying. The Midland Challenge Cup continued to be played in April while the championship continued to be played in September. In 1920 there was a three-way tie between Tom Williamson, George Buckle and Dick Wheildon. The following day there was a 36-hole playoff but Williamson and Wheildon were still tied and only after a further 9-hole playoff did Williamson win. In 1921 it was reported that the professionals were keen to separate the championship from the News of the World qualifying, and an extra event was organised in July for the qualifying. However the experiment was not repeated and from 1922 the September event reverted to covering both the championship and the qualifying. There was a surprise winner in 1921 when Willie Robertson won. However Tom Williamson won again in 1922 for what was to be the final time.

George Buckle, the 1912 champion, won in 1923 beating Ernest Hanton in the 18-hole playoff, played the following day. There was a four-way tie in 1924, Jack Bloxham winning the 18-hole playoff by two strokes. Buckle won for the third time in 1925, this time by three strokes. Ted Douglas, who had spent many year in New Zealand, won in 1926. In 1927 Tom Barber and Archie Compston tied on 147. Compston left immediately after the championship to play in the German Open and did not turn up for the playoff on the following day, Barber being awarded the championship by default.

The Daily Mail Tournament was not played from 1928 to 1935 and the opportunity was taken to separate the News of the World Match Play qualifying from the championship. The Midland Challenge Cup was awarded to the winner of the News of the World qualifying event, as was the case before 1911. In 1928 this was held in June with the championship in September but from 1929 the order was reversed, with the championship played in the early part of the year and the News of the World qualifying in September. There was a 5-way tie in the 1928 championship. Frank Weston won the 18-hole playoff the following day by two strokes. There was another playoff in 1929. George Buckle beat Tom Green by two strokes, for his fourth championship win. Green won a stroke in 1930 and retained the title in 1931, winning by four strokes. In 1932 Tom Barber won the title for a second time after a three-way playoff. Charlie Ward won the title in 1933 by two strokes from Barber and Algy Holton.

From 1934 to 1937 Dunlop sponsored a number of regional events. In most cases these were new events but for the Midland region they sponsored the existing Midland Professional Championship. Charlie Ward retained the title in 1934. Bill Firkins won in 1935, while Bill Branch won by seven strokes in 1936 and Freddie Beck won in 1937. Except in 1935, when the event was not held, the winner gained entry to the end-of-season limited-field Dunlop-Metropolitan Tournament. Herbert Manton won the championship by four strokes in 1938. The Daily Mail Tournament had restarted in 1935. Sectional qualifying was initially separate from the championship but in the 1939 the two were combined. The event was over two days and was won by Bill Martin.

The championship restarted in September 1946, also acting as qualifying for the News of the World Match Play. However, from 1947 it returned to an early season event. Walter Lees won in 1946 with his older brother Arthur Lees winning in 1948 and 1949. Charlie Ward, the 1933 and 1934 champion, won three more times in the 1950s, in 1950, 1953 and 1955, and for a sixth time in 1963. Another multiple winner was Jack Hargreaves, who won in 1952 and 1960. Sectional qualifying for the News of the World ended in 1961 and from 1962 was replaced by local qualifying immediately before the event. The 1965 championship was reduced to 27 holes after early morning delays meant that it proved impossible for the entire field to complete 36 holes in a single day. From 1966 the event was played over two days. Stuart Murray was the most successful golfer in the 1960s, winning three times, in 1964, 1967 and 1968.

Brian Waites won four times in the 1970s, in 1972, 1977, 1978 and 1979. He won in 1977 in a sudden-death playoff, the first in the championship's history, and in a second playoff in 1979. Uniroyal sponsored the event from 1970 to 1977.

== Winners ==
Year	Winner	Score	Margin of victory	Runner(s)-up	Venue	Ref
Midland Professional Championship
1898	(Scotland) David Brown	238	1 stroke	(England) Sydney Wingate	Harborne	
1899	(England) Alfred Toogood	167	1 stroke	(England) James Sherlock	Sandwell Park	
1900	(England) Tom Williamson	157	2 strokes	(England) George Cawsey	Derbyshire	
1901	(England) James Sherlock	156	4 strokes	(England) George Cawsey	Atherstone	
1902	(England) Tom Williamson	152	1 stroke	(England) Alfred Lewis	Bilston	
1903	(England) James Sherlock	152	9 strokes	(England) George Cawsey (Scotland) Laurence Gourlay (England) Willie Lewis	Cleeve Hill	
1904	(England) Alfred Lewis	153	1 stroke	(England) James Sherlock	Sutton Coldfield	
1905	(England) Tom Williamson	159	Playoff (Note: The tie between Williamson and Sherlock was resolved at the autumn meeting at Kings Norton which Williamson won with a score of 145, Sherlock scoring 153.)	(England) James Sherlock	Harborne	
1906	(England) Jack Fulford	153	1 stroke	(England) William Jeffries	Derbyshire	
1907	(England) Tom Williamson	151	1 stroke	(England) George Cawsey (Scotland) George Coburn	Robin Hood	
1908	(England) George Cawsey	150	2 strokes	(England) Tom Williamson	Notts	
1909	(England) Tom Williamson	145	4 strokes	(Scotland) Frank Coltart	Leicestershire	
1910	(England) Edward Veness	151	2 strokes	(England) Jack Oke	Stourbridge	
1911	(England) Tom Williamson	153	1 stroke	(England) Jack Bloxham (England) George Tuck	Ladbrook Park	
1912	(England) George Buckle	150	Playoff (Note: Buckle and Cawsey tied at 76 after an 18-hole playoff the following morning. They played a further 18 holes in the afternoon with Buckle scoring 79 and Cawsey 82.)	(England) Harry Cawsey	Seacroft	
1913	(England) George Tuck	153	1 stroke	(England) George Buckle	Little Aston	
1914–1918: No tournament
1919	(England) Bert Weastell	149	Playoff (Note: Weastell beat Holland 41 to 43 in a 9-hole playoff, played the same evening.)	(England) Len Holland	Sandwell Park	
1920	(England) Tom Williamson	151	Playoff (Note: Williamson and Wheildon tied on 148 with Buckle on 153 after a 36-hole playoff, played the following day. Williamson beat Wheildon 39 to 40 after a further 9 holes.)	(England) George Buckle (England) Dick Wheildon	Moseley	
1921	(England) Willie Robertson	144	1 stroke	(England) George Buckle	Robin Hood	
1922	(England) Tom Williamson	144	1 stroke	(England) Len Holland	Copt Heath	
1923	(England) George Buckle	138	Playoff (Note: Buckle beat Hanton 74 to 75 in an 18-hole playoff, played the following day.)	(England) Ernest Hanton	Edgbaston	
1924	(England) Jack Bloxham	146	Playoff (Note: Bloxham scored 73 in a playoff, played the following day, Holland and Tuck scored 75 while Buckle scored 76.)	(England) George Buckle (England) Len Holland (England) George Tuck	Olton	
1925	(England) George Buckle	144	3 strokes	(England) Jim Morris (England) George Tuck (England) Tom Williamson	Walmley	
1926	(Scotland) Ted Douglas	144	1 stroke	(England) Tom Barber	Finham Park	
1927	(England) Tom Barber	147	Playoff (Note: Compston left immediately after the championship to play in the German Open and did not turn up for the playoff on the following day.)	(England) Archie Compston	Harborne	
1928	(England) Frank Weston	149	Playoff (Note: Weston won a playoff, played the following day, with 74, ahead of Wheildon with 76, O'Neill 77, Richards 78 and Pixton 79.)	(Republic of Ireland) Moses O'Neill (England) Charles Pixton (England) Tom Richards (England) Dick Wheildon	Handsworth	
1929	(England) George Buckle	144	Playoff (Note: Buckle beat Green 74 to 76 in the 18-hole playoff, played the same day.)	(Wales) Tom Green	North Worcestershire	
1930	(Wales) Tom Green	144	1 stroke	(Republic of Ireland) Michael Bingham (England) Tom Williamson	Copt Heath	
1931	(Wales) Tom Green	139	4 strokes	(England) Bill Firkins (England) Bob Pemberton	Castle Bromwich	
1932	(England) Tom Barber	143	Playoff (Note: In a playoff Barber scored 73, Adwick 78 and Gadd 82.)	(England) James Adwick (England) Bert Gadd	Henbury	
1933	(England) Charlie Ward	145	2 strokes	(England) Tom Barber (England) Algy Holton	Little Aston	
Dunlop-Midland Professional Championship
1934	(England) Charlie Ward	143	2 strokes	(England) Bill Martin (England) Tom Richards (England) Willie Robertson	Olton	
1935	(England) Bill Firkins	150	1 stroke	(England) Bill Hancock (England) Norman Roffe	Little Aston	
1936	(England) Bill Branch	137	7 strokes	(England) Freddie Beck	Sandwell Park	
1937	(England) Freddie Beck	141	1 stroke	(England) George Buckle	Harborne	
Midland Professional Championship
1938	(England) Herbert Manton	139	4 strokes	(England) Jack Hargreaves (England) Jack Loach	Beau Desert	
1939	(England) Bill Martin	145	5 strokes	(England) Norman Roffe (England) George Johnson	Woodhall Spa	
1940–1945: No tournament
1946	(England) Walter Lees	140	4 strokes	(England) Jack Cawsey (England) Leslie Cliffe	Sandwell Park	
1947	(England) Ken Adwick	144	1 stroke	(England) Bill Branch (England) Charlie Ward	North Shore	
1948	(England) Arthur Lees	143	Playoff (Note: Lees beat Hassall 68 to 75 in a playoff.)	(England) Tom Hassall	Trentham	
1949	(England) Arthur Lees	136	1 stroke	(England) Charlie Ward	Blackwell	
1950	(England) Charlie Ward	138	Playoff (Note: Ward beat Hargreaves 33 to 38 in a playoff, played the same evening.)	(England) Jack Hargreaves	Moor Hall	
1951	(England) Ron Moses	145	Playoff (Note: Moses beat Williamson 70 to 73.)	(England) Bert Williamson	Sandwell Park	
1952	(England) Jack Hargreaves	143	Playoff (Note: Hargreaves beat Ward 70 to 75.)	(England) Charlie Ward	Copt Heath	
1953	(England) Charlie Ward	143	Playoff (Note: Ward scored 71, Noke 72 and Hargreaves 75.)	(England) Jack Hargreaves (England) Edgar Noke	Harborne	
1954	(England) Alan Cunningham	142	1 stroke	(England) Frank Jowle	Olton	
1955	(England) Charlie Ward	142	3 strokes	(England) Frank Jowle	South Staffordshire	
1956	(England) Bob Hastelow	137	Playoff (Note: Hastelow beat Ward 69 to 73.)	(England) Charlie Ward	Robin Hood	
1957	(England) David Snell	145	1 stroke	(England) George Maisey (England) Ralph Moffitt	Seacroft	
1958	(England) Jack Cawsey	141	1 stroke	(England) Tony Grubb (England) Frank Jowle (England) Charlie Ward	Hawkstone Park	
1959	(England) George Maisey	140	1 stroke	(England) Ralph Moffitt	Luffenham Heath	
1960	(England) Jack Hargreaves	137	4 strokes	(England) Peter Butler (England) Bryon Hutchinson	Ladbrook Park	
1961	(England) Peter Butler	142	Playoff (Note: Butler beat Johnson 67 to 70.)	(England) George Johnson	Hawkstone Park	
1962	(England) Tony Rees	141	1 stroke	(England) Peter Butler (England) Ralph Moffitt	Luffenham Heath	
1963	(England) Charlie Ward	139	2 strokes	(England) Peter Butler	Edgbaston	
1964	(Scotland) Stuart Murray	139	1 stroke	(England) Peter Butler (England) Ralph Moffitt (England) Don Smart (England) David Talbot	Rushcliffe	
1965	(Republic of Ireland) Sean Hunt	102 (Note: The event was reduced to 27 holes.)	2 strokes	(England) Don Smart (England) John Wiggett	Hawkstone Park	
1966	(England) John Anderson	143	3 strokes	(England) David Lait (England) Ted Large	Coxmoor	
1967	(Scotland) Stuart Murray	143	Playoff (Note: Murray beat Anderson 71 to 78.)	(England) John Anderson	Whittington Barracks	
1968	(Scotland) Stuart Murray	143	3 strokes	(England) Maurice Bembridge	Olton	
1969	(England) Terry Squires	144	1 stroke	(England) Peter Butler (England) David Snell (England) Brian Waites	Shifnal	
Uniroyal Midland PGA Championship
1970	(Wales) David Llewellyn	138	2 strokes	(England) Bob Johnson	Moor Hall	
1971	(England) Bob Beattie	142	1 stroke	(England) Maurice Bembridge	South Staffordshire	
1972	(England) Brian Waites	138	3 strokes	(Republic of Ireland) Eamonn Darcy	Kedleston Park	
1973	(England) Richard Livingston	140	Playoff (Note: Livingston beat Snell 72 to 73.)	(England) David Snell	Handsworth	
1974	(England) Mike Gallagher	137	2 strokes	(England) Ted Large (Wales) David Llewellyn (England) Brian Waites	Stratford-on-Avon	
1975	(Republic of Ireland) Hugh Boyle	144	1 stroke	(England) Terry Squires	Peterborough Milton	
1976	(England) Paul Herbert	138	5 strokes	(England) Paul Bottell (England) Tony Grubb (England) Ian Richardson	Longcliffe	
1977	(England) Brian Waites	138	Playoff (Note: Waites won with a par at the second sudden-death hole.)	(England) Phil Weaver	Coxmoor	
Midland PGA Championship
1978	(England) Brian Waites	135	5 strokes	(England) Ian Richardson (England) Phil Weaver	Ladbrook Park	
1979	(England) Brian Waites	143	Playoff (Note: Waites won with a par at the first extra hole.)	(England) David Steele	Lincoln	
1980	(Wales) David Vaughan	141	2 strokes	(England) Brian Waites	Barnham Broom	
1981	(England) David Stewart	140	2 strokes	(England) Richard Livingston	Burton-on-Trent	
1982	(England) Pip Elson	136	4 strokes	(England) David Dunk	Staverton Park	
1983	(England) Tony Minshall	144	2 strokes	(England) Bob Larratt	Staverton Park	
1984	(Wales) Mark Mouland	136	Playoff (Note: Mouland won at the first extra hole.)	(England) Steve Marr	Staverton Park	
1985	(England) Kevin Hayward	142	Playoff (Note: Hayward won at the second extra hole.)	(Wales) Andy Griffiths	Staverton Park	
1986	(England) Tony Skingle	70 (Note: The event was reduced to 18 holes after the first day was abandoned because of bad weather.)	Playoff (Note: Skingle won at the second extra hole, Hinton having dropped out at the first.)	(England) Philip Hinton (England) Phil Weaver	Sutton Coldfield	
1987	(England) Ross McFarlane (Note: McFarlane won the event but Mouland became the Midland Professional champion since McFarlane was not a Midland member.)	272	4 strokes	(Wales) Mark Mouland	Staverton	
1988	(Wales) Graham Farr	276	3 strokes	(England) Jim Rhodes	Kings Norton	
1989	(England) Joe Higgins	138	4 strokes	(Wales) Graham Farr	Forest of Arden	
1990	(England) Gary Stafford	275	8 strokes	(Wales) Graham Farr	Forest of Arden	
1991	(England) Kevin Dickens	283	5 strokes	(England) Chris Hall	Forest of Arden	
1992	(England) Joe Higgins	286	2 strokes	(England) Stephen Russell	South Staffordshire	
1993	(England) Peter Baker	143	1 stroke	(England) Jim Payne	The Warwickshire	
1994	(England) Peter Baker	143	2 strokes	(England) David Eddiford (England) John King	The Warwickshire	
1995	(Wales) Shane Rose	141	Playoff (Note: Rose won with a birdie at the first extra hole.)	(Northern Ireland) Cameron Clark	The Warwickshire	
1996	(England) David J. Russell	137	1 stroke	(England) Peter Baker (England) Neil Turley	The Warwickshire	
1997	(England) Joe Higgins	137	2 strokes	(England) Peter Baker (England) Paul Wesselingh	The Belfry	
1998	(England) Steve Webster	137	1 stroke	(England) Joe Higgins	The Belfry	
1999	(England) Chris Hall	136	4 strokes	(England) Carl Mason (England) Andy Stokes	The Belfry	
2000	(England) David J. Russell	134	8 strokes	(England) Matt McGuire (England) Darren Prosser	The Belfry	
2001	(England) Tim Rouse	210	1 stroke	(England) Martin Poxon	Belton Woods	
2002	(England) Robert Rock	213	2 strokes	(England) Alasdair Thomas	Belton Woods	
2003	(England) Philip Edwards	209	1 stroke	(England) Brian Rimmer	Belton Woods	
2004	(England) Paul Streeter	213	2 strokes	(England) Brian Rimmer	Belton Woods	
2005	(England) Adrian Carey	214	Playoff (Note: Carey won with a birdie at the first extra hole.)	(England) Paul Bagshaw	Belton Woods	
2006	(England) Paul Streeter	211	Playoff (Note: Streeter won with a birdie at the first extra hole.)	(England) Daniel Greenwood	Belton Woods	
2007	(England) Ian Lyner	211	2 strokes	(England) Simon Lilly	Belton Woods	
2008	(England) Ian Walley	201	Playoff (Note: Walley won with an eagle at the fifth extra hole.)	(England) Simon Lilly	Belton Woods	
2009	(England) Cameron Clark	211	2 strokes	(England) Ian Walley	Belton Woods	
2010	(England) Cameron Clark	200	9 strokes	(England) Paul Streeter	Belton Woods	
2011	(England) Matthew Cort	196	2 strokes	(England) Paul Streeter	Belton Woods	
2012	(England) Jak Hamblett	136	1 stroke	(England) Craig Shave	Belton Woods	
2013	(England) Matthew Cort	131	2 strokes	(England) James Whatley	Cold Ashby	
2014	(England) Paul Broadhurst	129	Playoff	(England) Matthew Cort	Shifnal	
2015	(England) Matthew Cort	128	6 strokes	(England) Luke Towler (England) Andrew Willey	Shifnal	
2016	(England) Paul Streeter and (England) Andrew Willey	131	Playoff	Tied (Note: The sudden-death playoff was stopped after three holes due to darkness.)	Shifnal	
2017	(England) Luke Towler	136	Playoff	(England) Christopher Evans (England) James Freeman (England) Andrew Willey	Shifnal	
2018	(England) Andrew Willey	68 (Note: The event was reduced to 18 holes because of strong winds.)	1 stroke	(England) Matthew Cort (England) James Whatley	Shifnal	
2019	(England) James Brittain	134	1 stroke	(England) Andrew Willey	Shifnal	
2020	(England) James Brittain	136	3 strokes	(England) Cameron Hoggarth (England) Craig Shave	Moseley	
2021	(England) Adam Keogh	133	1 stroke	(England) Simon Lilly (England) Craig Shave	Moseley	
2022	(England) James Whatley	127	2 strokes	(England) James Freeman (England) Simon Lilly	Sapey	
2023	(England) Daniel Whitby-Smith	63 (Note: The event was reduced to 18 holes because of bad weather.)	2 strokes	(England) Jordan Boulton (England) James Whatley (England) Andrew Willey	Harborne	

Additional source:

From 1911 to 1927 (except in 1921) and in 1946 the championships were also the Midland section qualifying events for the News of the World Matchplay. The 1939 championship was the Midland section qualifying event for the Daily Mail Tournament. The 1954 championship acted as the qualifying event for the Goodwin (Sheffield) Foursomes Tournament while the 1959 event was the qualifying for the Sherwood Forest Foursomes Tournament.
