= Penfold Professional Golf League =

Former golf tournament in England

Tournament information
- Location: Northwood, London; Sutton Coldfield, Staffordshire
- Established: 1938
- Course(s): Sandy Lodge Golf Club; Little Aston Golf Club
- Month played: June
- Final year: 1939

Final champion
- Henry Cotton and Charles Whitcombe

Location in England

The Penfold Professional Golf League was a professional golf tournament played in England. The event was held twice, in 1938 and 1939. It was contested by 12 players, each playing the other in a round robin format. Everyone played two matches per day for the first five days and another match on the final day, a Saturday. Two points were awarded for a win and one point for a halved match. Total prize money was £1,000 with £200 for the winner. The tournament was sponsored by Penfold Golf.

== 1938 ==
The event was held at Sandy Lodge Golf Club in Northwood, London from 13–18 June. The field consisted of the leading 11 in the 1937 Harry Vardon Trophy standings together with Percy Alliss who had won the 1937 News of the World Matchplay. The Harry Vardon Trophy standings were based on the average score in major stroke play events during the season. The winner of the Yorkshire Evening News Tournament also qualified but since the winner, Arthur Lacey, finished fourth in the averages, there were places for the leading 11 in the averages.

Final table

Pos	Player	W	H	L	Pts
1	(England) Percy Alliss	7	2	2	16
2	(England) Bert Gadd	5	5	1	15
2	(England) Reg Whitcombe	7	1	3	15
4	(England) Dick Burton	5	2	4	12
4	(England) Henry Cotton	5	2	4	12
4	(England) Arthur Lacey	5	2	4	12
7	(England) Sam King	5	1	5	11
7	(England) Alf Padgham	4	3	4	11
9	(England) Bill Branch	3	3	5	9
10	(England) Charles Whitcombe	3	2	6	8
11	(England) Abe Mitchell	3	0	8	6
12	(Republic of Ireland) Paddy Mahon	1	3	7	5

== 1939 ==
The event was held at Little Aston Golf Club in Sutton Coldfield, Staffordshire from 12–17 June. The field consisted of the defending champion, Percy Alliss and the leading 11 in the 1938 Harry Vardon Trophy standings. As in 1937 the Harry Vardon Trophy standings were based on the average score in major stroke play events during the season.

Final table

Pos	Player	W	H	L	Pts
1	(England) Henry Cotton	9	0	2	18
1	(England) Charles Whitcombe	8	2	1	18
3	(England) Bert Gadd	7	0	4	14
4	(England) Sam King	5	3	3	13
5	(Scotland) Jimmy Adams	6	0	5	12
5	(England) Alf Padgham	6	0	5	12
7	(England) Reg Whitcombe	4	2	5	10
8	(England) Arthur Lacey	4	1	6	9
8	(England) Alf Perry	4	1	6	9
10	(England) Dick Burton	4	0	7	8
11	(Wales) Dai Rees	1	3	7	5
12	(England) Percy Alliss	1	2	8	4

== Winners ==
Year	Winner	Country	Venue	Score	Margin of victory	Runner-up	Winner's share (£)	Ref
1938	Percy Alliss	England	Sandy Lodge Golf Club	16	1 point	(England) Bert Gadd (England) Reg Whitcombe	200	
1939	Henry Cotton; Charles Whitcombe	England; England	Little Aston Golf Club	18	Tie		Shared 200 and 150	
