= 1949 Open Championship =

Coordinates: 51.274°N 1.367°E

Tournament information
- Dates: 6–9 July 1949
- Location: Sandwich, England
- Course: Royal St George's Golf Club

Statistics
- Par: 72
- Length: 6,728 yards (6,152 m)
- Field: 96 players, 31 after cut
- Cut: 147 (+3)
- Prize fund: £1,500
- Winner's share: £300

Champion
- (South Africa) Bobby Locke
- 283 (−5), playoff

Location in England
Location in Kent. England

The 1949 Open Championship was the 78th Open Championship, held 6–9 July at Royal St George's Golf Club in Sandwich, Kent, England. Bobby Locke of South Africa won the first of his four Open titles in a 36-hole playoff, twelve strokes ahead of runner-up Harry Bradshaw of Ireland. It was the first playoff at the Open since 1933.

This edition was originally scheduled for Royal Cinque Ports, but it was flooded in early 1949 and the venue was switched to Royal St George's. Royal Cinque Ports was retained as a venue for one of the qualifying rounds.

Qualifying took place on 4–5 July, Monday and Tuesday, with 18 holes at Royal St. George's and 18 holes at Royal Cinque Ports. The number of qualifiers was limited to a maximum of 100, and ties for 100th place did not qualify. Bradshaw led the qualifiers scoring 139 with Locke next at 140; the qualifying score was 154 and 96 players advanced. The total prize money was increased fifty per cent, from £1,000 to £1,500. The winner received £300 with £200 for second, £100 for third, £75 for fourth, £50 for fifth and then £20 each for the next 35 players. The £1,500 was completed with a £15 prize for winning the qualification event and four £15 prizes for the lowest score in each round. For the first time a silver medal was awarded to the first amateur.

In the opening round on Wednesday, Jimmy Adams led with 67. Locke entered as the favorite, but was in a tie for fourth place, despite taking seven at the 14th, cutting his tee shot out of bounds. After the second round on Thursday, Sam King had the lead on 140, Adams dropping back after a 77. At the 5th hole, Bradshaw's ball finished in a broken beer bottle; he decided to play it, getting the ball clear but dropping a shot on the hole. The maximum number of players making the cut after 36 holes was again set at forty, and ties for 40th place did not make the cut. With eleven players tied for 32nd place at 148, the cut was 147 (+3) and a record low 31 players advanced to the final two rounds.

After the morning round on Friday, there were three players tied for the lead on 213: Bradshaw, Locke, and Max Faulkner. Charlie Ward and King were just a stroke behind. Bradshaw was in one of the early groups and had a final round of 70 to take the lead on 283. Playing forty minutes later, Locke reached the turn in 32 but took five at the 10th, 14th, and 15th, and then three-putted the short 16th. However he then sank a ten-foot (3 m) birdie putt at 17 then from four feet (1.2 m) for par at the last to tie Bradshaw. None of the later players in contention could get close to Bradshaw and Locke. De Vicenzo had a good last round of 69 to take third place. His chances were spoilt by an inward half of 40 in the morning which had left his three strokes behind.

In the playoff on Saturday, both players started well but Locke had a three-shot lead after thirteen holes. At the 520-yard 14th hole, Locke put his second shot stone dead for a three while Bradshaw found a bunker and eventually took six. Locke's lead was thus extended to six and then to seven at the end of the morning round. The lead quickly extended to 10 after two holes of the afternoon round as Bradshaw started 6-5. Bradshaw gained a shot at the 9th and 11th, but Locke went on to win the playoff by twelve strokes.

== Round summaries ==
=== First round ===
Wednesday, 6 July 1948

Place	Player	Score	To par
1	(Scotland) Jimmy Adams	67	−5
T2	(Republic of Ireland) Harry Bradshaw	68	−4
T2	(Argentina) Roberto De Vicenzo	68	−4
T6	(England) Ken Adwick	69	−3
T6	(England) Ken Bousfield	69	−3
T6	(Scotland) John Fallon	69	−3
T6	(South Africa) Bobby Locke	69	−3
T6	(Australia) Bill Shankland	69	−3
T6	(England) Ernie Southerden	69	−3
T6	(England) Norman Sutton	69	−3

=== Second round ===
Thursday, 7 July 1949

Place	Player	Score	To par
1	(England) Sam King	71-69=140	−4
T2	(England) Max Faulkner	71-71=142	−2
T2	(Australia) Bill Shankland	69-73=142	−2
T4	(England) Dick Burton	73-70=143	−1
T4	(Argentina) Roberto De Vicenzo	68-75=143	−1
T6	(Scotland) Jimmy Adams	67-77=144	E
T6	(United States) Johnny Bulla	71-73=144	E
T6	(Scotland) John Fallon	69-75=144	E
T6	(England) Arthur Lees	74-70=144	E
T6	(United States) Frank Stranahan (a)	71-73=144	E
T6	(England) Charlie Ward	73-71=144	E

=== Third round ===
Friday, 8 July 1949 (morning)

Place	Player	Score	To par
T1	(Republic of Ireland) Harry Bradshaw	68-77-68=213	−3
T1	(England) Max Faulkner	71-71-71=213	−3
T1	(South Africa) Bobby Locke	69-76-68=213	−3
T4	(England) Sam King	71-69-74=214	−2
T4	(England) Charlie Ward	73-71-70=214	−2
6	(England) Walter Lees	74-72-69=215	−1
T7	(Scotland) Jimmy Adams	67-77-72=216	E
T7	(Argentina) Roberto De Vicenzo	68-75-73=216	E
T7	(Scotland) John Fallon	69-75-72=216	E
T7	(England) Arthur Lees	74-70-72=216	E

=== Final round ===
Friday, 8 July 1949 (afternoon)

Place	Player	Score	To par	Money (£)
T1	(Republic of Ireland) Harry Bradshaw	68-77-68-70=283	−5	Playoff
T1	(South Africa) Bobby Locke	69-76-68-70=283	−5	Playoff
3	(Argentina) Roberto De Vicenzo	68-75-73-69=285	−3	100
T4	(England) Sam King	71-69-74-72=286	−2	62 ½
T4	(England) Charlie Ward	73-71-70-72=286	−2	62 ½
T6	(England) Max Faulkner	71-71-71-74=287	−1	20
T6	(England) Arthur Lees	74-70-72-71=287	−1	20
T8	(Scotland) Jimmy Adams	67-77-72-72=288	E	20
T8	(Scotland) John Fallon	69-75-72-72=288	E	20
T8	(England) Wally Smithers	72-75-70-71=288	E	20

Amateurs: Stranahan (+2), Francis (+19)

=== Playoff ===
Saturday, 9 July 1949

Place	Player	Score	To par	Money (£)
1	(South Africa) Bobby Locke	67-68=135	−9	300
2	(Republic of Ireland) Harry Bradshaw	74-73=147	+3	200

==== Scorecards ====
Morning round

Hole	1	2	3	4	5	6	7	8	9	Out	10	11	12	13	14	15	16	17	18	Back	Total
(South Africa) Locke	4	4	3	4	4	3	4	3	4	33	4	4	4	4	3	4	3	4	4	34	67
(Republic of Ireland) Bradshaw	4	4	3	4	5	3	5	3	4	35	4	4	5	4	6	4	3	5	4	39	74

Afternoon round

Hole	1	2	3	4	5	6	7	8	9	Out	10	11	12	13	14	15	16	17	18	Back	Total
(South Africa) Locke	4	4	3	4	4	3	4	3	4	33	4	4	4	4	4	5	3	3	4	35	68
(Republic of Ireland) Bradshaw	6	5	3	4	5	3	4	3	3	36	4	3	4	5	5	5	3	4	4	37	73
