= Frank Weston =

Frank Weston may refer to:

- Frank Weston (bishop of Knaresborough) (1935–2003), English Anglican Bishop of Knaresborough
- Frank Weston (bishop of Zanzibar) (1871–1924), English Anglican Bishop of Zanzibar
- Frank Weston (golfer) (1894–1963), English golfer
- Frank W. Weston (1843–1911), English-born American architect
