= 1948 Open Championship =

Coordinates: 56.042°N 2.821°W

Tournament information
- Dates: 30 June – 2 July 1948
- Location: Gullane, East Lothian, Scotland
- Course: Muirfield

Statistics
- Par: 71
- Field: 97 players, 36 after cut
- Cut: 148 (+6)
- Prize fund: £1,000 $4,000
- Winner's share: £150 $600

Champion
- (England) Henry Cotton
- 284 (E)

Location in Scotland
Location in East Lothian, Scotland

The 1948 Open Championship was the 77th Open Championship, held 30 June to 2 July at Muirfield in Gullane, East Lothian, Scotland. Henry Cotton, age 41, won his third and final Open title, five strokes ahead of runner-up and defending champion Fred Daly.

Qualifying took place on 28–29 June, Monday and Tuesday, with 18 holes at Muirfield and 18 holes at the number 1 course Gullane. The number of qualifiers was limited to a maximum of 100, and ties for 100th place would not qualify. Henry Cotton led on 138; the qualifying score was 152 and 97 players advanced. Cotton had led the qualification in 1935, the previous time the Open had been held at Muirfield.

Charlie Ward, Sam King, and Flory Van Donck shot 69 to share the first round lead. Cotton opened with a 71, then led by four strokes after a 66 in the second round, one off his own tournament record set in 1934. While scoring conditions in the first two rounds were ideal, with five other rounds of sub-70 in the second, the change in weather on the final day caused scores to soar. The maximum number of players making the cut after 36 holes was again set at 40, and ties for 40th place were not included. The cut was at 148 (+6) and 36 players advanced.

Over the final two rounds, the lowest round was 70. Cotton carded rounds of 75-72 to set a clubhouse lead of 284 that no one came close to matching. Fred Daly came closest with a 289, five shots behind.

Roberto De Vicenzo made his Open Championship debut and finished in third place. Over the next two years he followed with another third and a runner-up finish. He won the title nineteen years later, in 1967.

== Round summaries ==
=== First round ===
Wednesday, 30 June 1948

Place	Player	Score	To par
T1	(England) Sam King	69	−2
T1	(Belgium) Flory Van Donck	69	−2
T1	(England) Charlie Ward	69	−2
T4	(Argentina) Roberto De Vicenzo	70	−1
T4	(England) Frank Jowle	70	−1
T6	(England) Henry Cotton	71	E
T6	(England) Reg Horne	71	E
T6	(Australia) Norman Von Nida	71	E
T10	(Northern Ireland) Fred Daly	72	+1
T10	(England) Arthur Lacey	72	+1
T10	(United States) Lawson Little	72	+1
T10	(Scotland) Walter Lyle	72	+1
T10	(England) Norman Sutton	72	+1

=== Second round ===
Thursday, 1 July 1948

Place	Player	Score	To par
1	(England) Henry Cotton	71-66=137	−5
T2	(England) Sam King	69-72=141	−1
T2	(England) Charlie Ward	69-72=141	−1
T4	(England) Arthur Lees	73-69=142	E
T4	(Belgium) Flory Van Donck	69-73=142	E
T6	(Northern Ireland) Fred Daly	72-71=143	+1
T6	(Argentina) Roberto De Vicenzo	70-73=143	+1
T6	(England) Alf Padgham	73-70=143	+1
T6	(Australia) Norman Von Nida	71-72=143	+1
T10	(England) Dick Burton	74-70=144	+2
T10	(England) Jack Hargreaves	76-68=144	+2
T10	(Wales) Dai Rees	73-71=144	+2
T10	(England) Reg Whitcombe	77-67=144	+2

=== Third round ===
Friday, 2 July 1948 (morning)

Place	Player	Score	To par
1	(England) Henry Cotton	71-66-75=212	−1
2	(England) Alf Padgham	73-70-71=214	+1
T3	(Argentina) Roberto De Vicenzo	70-73-72=215	+2
T3	(England) Sam King	69-72-74=215	+2
T3	(England) Arthur Lees	73-69-73=215	+2
T3	(Belgium) Flory Van Donck	69-73-73=215	+2
T7	(Northern Ireland) Fred Daly	72-71-73=216	+3
T7	(England) Charlie Ward	69-72-75=216	+3
T7	(England) Alan Waters	75-71-70=216	+3
10	(England) Jack Hargreaves	76-68-73=217	+4

=== Final round ===
Friday, 2 July 1948 (afternoon)

Place	Player	Score	To par	Money (£)
1	(England) Henry Cotton	71-66-75-72=284	E	150
2	(Northern Ireland) Fred Daly	72-71-73-73=289	+5	100
T3	(Argentina) Roberto De Vicenzo	70-73-72-75=290	+6	41 ¼
T3	(England) Jack Hargreaves	76-68-73-73=290	+6	41 ¼
T3	(Australia) Norman Von Nida	71-72-76-71=290	+6	41 ¼
T3	(England) Charlie Ward	69-72-75-74=290	+6	41 ¼
T7	(United States) Johnny Bulla	74-72-73-72=291	+7	15
T7	(England) Sam King	69-72-74-76=291	+7	15
T7	(England) Alf Padgham	73-70-71-77=291	+7	15
T7	(Belgium) Flory Van Donck	69-73-73-76=291	+7	15
