= Walter Lees =

Walter Lees may refer to:

- Walter Lees (cricketer) (1875–1924), English cricketer
- Walter Lees (golfer) (1916–2012), English golfer
- Walter E. Lees (1887–1957), American aviator
