= Jack Hargreaves (disambiguation) =

Jack Hargreaves was an English television presenter and writer.

Other people with this name include:

- Jack Hargreaves (golfer), English golfer
- Jack Hargreaves (rower), Australian rower
