= Royal Gold Tournament =

Tournament information
- Location: Bridge of Don, Aberdeen, Scotland
- Established: 1962
- Course(s): Murcar Links Golf Club
- Month played: August
- Final year: 1962

Final champion
- Ralph Moffitt

Location in Scotland

The Royal Gold Tournament was a golf tournament on the British PGA circuit contested in 1962. It was played in a 12-man round-robin format at the Murcar Links Golf Club, Bridge of Don, Aberdeen, Scotland. Ralph Moffitt won the event with 18 points, 3 ahead of the rest of the field. It was the second round-robin event of the season, following the Esso Golden Tournament.

The competitors played each of the other 11 in an 18-hole stroke play contest. Matches were played as either four-balls or three-balls, so that 5 rounds of golf were contested, one in which they played three opponents and four in which they played two opponents.

Ralph Moffitt won 9 of the 11 matches, giving him 18 points, 3 ahead of the rest. He had scored 16 points before the final afternoon round, 5 ahead of anyone else, giving him a guaranteed victory at that point since only 4 points were available in the final round. Bernard Hunt had the best aggregate score over the 5 rounds with a total of 351, one better than Ralph Moffitt, winning him an extra £25.

== Winners ==
Year	Winner	Country	Score	Margin of victory	Runners-up	Winner's share (£)	Ref
1962	Ralph Moffitt	England	18	3 points	(New Zealand) Bob Charles (England) Bernard Hunt (Australia) Kel Nagle	750	
