= Gleneagles Hotel Foursomes Tournament =

Tournament information
- Location: Auchterarder, Perthshire, Scotland
- Established: 1953
- Course(s): Gleneagles Hotel
- Month played: September/October
- Final year: 1966

Final champion
- Alex Caygill and Bernard Cawthray

The Gleneagles Hotel Foursomes Tournament was a pro-am golf tournament played at the Gleneagles Hotel, Auchterarder, Perthshire, Scotland. The event was held annually from 1953 to 1966. From 1953 to 1957 it was called the Gleneagles-Saxone Foursomes Tournament. Saxone was a Scottish footwear manufacturer.

== Detail ==
In 1953, 32 professionals were invited who each chose their own amateur partner. The event was played under handicap with the professionals playing off scratch and the amateurs limited to a handicap of 6. Play was over four days with two round played on the third day. The final and 3rd/4th place match were over 18 holes on the fourth day. Total prize money was £3,000.

The 1954 event was severally affected by rain. The first day's play was lost and the first round was played at Carnoustie Golf Links on the second day. The players returned to Gleneagles, where the second and third round were played o the third day and the semi-final and final on the final day. There was a consolation event for those pairs beaten in the first round.

The 1955 event was reduced to three days, using the format used in 1954.

== Winners ==
Year	Winners	Country	Margin of victory	Runners-up	Winner's share (£)	Ref
Gleneagles-Saxone Foursomes
1953	Bernard Hunt & Stewart Ross	England; Scotland	2&1	(Wales) Dai Rees & G Dixon	500 (pro)	
1954	Bill Branch & Donald Cameron	England; Scotland	1 up	(England) Lambert Topping & (England) Jack Taylor	500 (pro)	
1955	Harry Bradshaw & Joe Carr	Ireland; Ireland	4&3	(England) Syd Scott & (England) W Sharp	500 (pro)	
1956	John Panton & W Alexander	Scotland; Scotland	2&1	(Republic of Ireland) Jimmy Martin & Joseph Foley-Brickley	500 (pro)	
1957	Eric Brown & George Will	Scotland; Scotland	19 holes	(England) Eric Lester & A Hill	500 (pro)	
Gleneagles Hotel Foursomes
1958	Donald Swaelens & Ian McDonald	Belgium; Scotland	4&3	(England) Peter Alliss & (United States) Harold Ridgley	350 (pro)	
1959	Tom Haliburton & Bill Igoe	Scotland; Ireland	7&5	(Wales) Dave Thomas & (England) Alan Thirlwell	350 (pro)	
1960	Dai Rees & Bill Glennie	Wales; Canada	2 up	(Scotland) Ian Smith & (England) Harry Bentley	350 (pro)	
1961	Brian Huggett & Martin Christmas	Wales; England	3&1	(Scotland) John Panton & (Scotland) D Mackintosh	350 (pro)	
1962	Christy O'Connor Snr & Noel Fogarty	Ireland; Ireland	3&2	(Wales) Brian Huggett & (England) Michael Burgess	350 (pro)	
1963	Peter Butler & David Kelley	England; England	2 up	(England) John Jacobs & (Republic of Ireland) Joe Carr	350 (pro)	
1964	Ken Bousfield & Keith Warren	England; England	6&5	(England) Malcolm Gregson & (England) Michael Burgess	350 (pro)	
1965	Brian Huggett & Michael Burgess	Wales; England	4&3	(England) Tony Coop & (England) Ben Crabtree	350 (pro)	
1966	Alex Caygill & Bernard Cawthray	England; England	3&2	(England) Henry Cotton & (England) Peter Benka	350 (pro)	
