= Grand Bahama Open =

Professional golf tournament

Tournament information
- Location: Grand Bahama, Bahamas
- Established: 1966
- Format: Stroke play
- Final year: 1973

Final champion
- (England) Bernard Hunt

The Grand Bahama Open was a professional golf tournament that was held in Freeport on the island of Grand Bahama in The Bahamas from 1966 to 1973. It attracted many leading players from North America and in later years, Great Britain.

The tournament was hosted for the first four years at the Kings Inn & Golf Club, before moving to the Lucayan Country Club in 1970. The final three edition were held at Shannon Golf & Country Club.

== Winners ==
Year	Venue	Winner	Score	Ref
1973	Shannon Golf & Country Club	(England) Bernard Hunt	219 (+3)	
1972	Shannon Golf & Country Club	(England) Peter Butler	279 (−9)	
1971	Shannon Golf & Country Club	(England) Peter Butler	274 (−14)	
1970	Lucayan Country Club	(United States) Roland Stafford	290 (+2)	
1969	Kings Inn & Golf Club	(United States) Herb Hooper	278 (−10)	
1968	Kings Inn & Golf Club	(Canada) Wilf Homenuik	286 (−2)	
1967	Kings Inn & Golf Club	(United States) George Lewis	284 (−4)	
1966	Kings Inn & Golf Club	(United States) Paul Kelly	287 (−1)	

A similarly named event was hosted by the Grand Bahama Hotel in 1962. Held over a single round, it was won jointly by two Americans, professional Dave Ragan and amateur Dexter Daniel, with a score of 71 (one-under par).
