= Stuart Murray (golfer) =

Scottish golfer (1933–2023)

Personal information
- Full name: Stuart William Thomas Murray
- Nationality: Scotland
- Born: 10 November 1933 Paisley, Renfrewshire, Scotland
- Died: 23 January 2023 (aged 89) Paisley, Renfrewshire, Scotland

Career
- Sport: Golf
- Turned professional: 1963
- Former tour: European Senior Tour
- Professional wins: 11

Best results in major championships
- Masters Tournament: DNP
- PGA Championship: DNP
- U.S. Open: DNP
- The Open Championship: T40: 1964

Stuart William Thomas Murray (10 November 1933 – 23 January 2023) was a Scottish professional golfer. He had success as an amateur, winning the Scottish Amateur in 1962 and playing in the 1963 Walker Cup. A change in the rules relating to amateur status pushed him into turning professional in late 1963. He won the Midland Professional Championship three times between 1964 and 1968 and also the Strong Country Tournament in 1965.

== Amateur career ==
Murray qualified for the 1955 Open Championship at St Andrews, although he failed to make the cut. In 1958 he won the West of Scotland championship at Barassie, beating Lindsay Renfrew in the final. In the 1961 Scottish Amateur at Western Gailes, Murray lost in the final to James Walker. Walker was seven up after 13 holes of the morning round and eventually won 4 and 3. Murray won the 1962 Scottish Amateur at Muirfield, beating Ronnie Shade 2 and 1 in the final. Shade won the event for the following five years.

Murray played for Great Britain & Ireland against the rest of Europe in France in 1958 and in Sweden in 1962. In 1959 he made his debut for Scotland in the Men's Home Internationals, and played each year until he turned professional. Murray played in the 1963 Walker Cup at Turnberry. Playing with Michael Bonallack they won their foursomes match on the first morning and Murray beat Deane Beman 3 and 1 in the afternoon, as the home team took a 6–3 lead. However he lost both his matches on the second day and the US won the match 12–8.

== Professional career ==
Murray turned professional towards the end of 1963 following a change in the rules on amateur status. Murray was a sales representative for John Letters, a firm of golf club makers. Murray was initially a professional at Northamptonshire golf club, before moving to Hendon golf club from 1972.

While at Northamptonshire Murray had some success in regional events. He won the Midland Professional Championship three times, in 1964, 1967 and 1968. He also won the Northamptonshire Professional Championship four times, in 1964, 1966, 1969 and 1971. In Scotland he was a runner-up in the 1965 Northern Open behind Jock Brown, and in the Pringle of Scotland Tournament later in the year, behind Cobie Legrange.

Murray was a regular competitor in the Strong Country Tournament, a 36-hole event generally played in the Southampton area. Peter Alliss had won the tournament from 1961 to 1964 but Murray won in 1965. He had a final round 62 to win by 10 strokes. In 1968 he lost in a sudden-death playoff to Doug Sewell. Murray also won a qualifying round in the Shell Winter Tournament in late 1967, taking the first prize of £250. Murray qualified for the Open Championship in 1964, 1965 and 1966. He made the cut in 1964 and finished in a tie for 40th place.

Despite being nearly 60 when the tour started in 1992, Murray played on the European Senior Tour from 1992 to 1994.

== Personal life ==
Murray died on 23 January 2023, at the age of 89. He was widowed and had two sons.

== Amateur wins ==
- 1958 West of Scotland Amateur Championship, Renfrewshire Amateur Championship
- 1959 Renfrewshire Amateur Championship
- 1960 Edward Trophy, Glasgow Amateur Championship
- 1961 Edward Trophy
- 1962 Scottish Amateur
- 1963 Hampshire Amateur Championship, Tennant Cup

== Professional wins ==
- 1964 Midland Professional Championship, Northamptonshire Professional Championship
- 1965 Strong Country Tournament
- 1966 Northamptonshire Professional Championship
- 1967 Midland Professional Championship
- 1968 Midland Professional Championship
- 1969 Northamptonshire Professional Championship
- 1971 Northamptonshire Professional Championship
- 1972 Middlesex Open
- 1973 Middlesex Open
- 1978 Middlesex Professional Championship

== Results in major championships ==
Tournament	1955	1956	1957	1958	1959	1960	1961	1962	1963	1964	1965	1966
The Open Championship	CUT									T40	CUT	CUT

Note: Murray only played in The Open Championship.

Did not play

CUT = missed the half-way cut
"T" indicates a tie for a place

== Team appearances ==
Amateur

- Walker Cup (representing Great Britain and Ireland): 1963
- St Andrews Trophy (representing Great Britain & Ireland): 1958 (winners), 1962 (winners)
- Men's Home Internationals (representing Scotland): 1959 (joint winners), 1960, 1961 (winners), 1962 (joint winners), 1963 (joint winners)
