= Pringle of Scotland Tournament =

Golf tournament

Tournament information
- Location: United Kingdom
- Established: 1964
- Final year: 1967

Final champion
- Tony Jacklin

The Pringle of Scotland Tournament was a golf tournament played from 1964 to 1967 in the United Kingdom. The sponsor was clothing company Pringle of Scotland. The total prize money was £4,000.

Pringle of Scotland sponsored the PGA Seniors Championship from 1969 to 1974.

== Winners ==
Year	Winner	Country	Venue	Score	Margin of victory	Runner(s)-up	Winner's share (£)	Ref
1964	Harold Henning	South Africa	Carnoustie Golf Links	297	4 strokes	(England) Bernard Hunt	750	
1965	Cobie Legrange	South Africa	Barnton, Edinburgh	279	3 strokes	(England) Bernard Hunt (Scotland) Stuart Murray	750	
1966	Neil Coles	England	Barnton, Edinburgh	273	3 strokes	(England) Peter Alliss	750	
1967	Tony Jacklin	England	Royal Lytham & St Annes Golf Club	283	4 strokes	(England) David Snell	750	
