= Bill Igoe =

Rugby union player (1911–1993)

Squadron Leader William Anthony Kevin Igoe, FRAES, CE (17 April 1911 – 15 November 1993) was an Irish-born Royal Air Force officer who was senior controller for No. 11 Group RAF at RAF Biggin Hill. He was also a noted sportsman and businessman.

== Early life and sporting career ==
He was born in Nenagh, Co. Tipperary and educated at Presentation College Bray, Co. Wicklow and the Engineering College in Cork, part of University College Cork. This led to a scholarship to study aeronautical engineering at the London College of Aeronautical Engineering, and from there he joined the RAF. His sporting career began at this time. He was particularly gifted on the rugby field, where he played for a Leinster Schools XV against both Connacht and Munster in the 1928–29 season. He also won a Munster Senior Cup medal with Dolphin during the 1930–31 season. In England he played for London Irish and the RAF. The 1935 edition of Who's Who in Sport listed his activities as rugby, boxing, tennis, golf, and swimming, in the first two of which he represented the RAF. He was captain of London Irish in 1949, and played his last game at the age of 40 in 1951. During the period he also had international rugby trials for Ireland twice, although nothing came of them due to service commitments. He went on to play squash at the highest level, and his career as an amateur golfer reached its apex with winning the Gleneagles Hotel Foursomes Tournament in 1959, in which most of the country's biggest names participated that year.

== RAF officer ==
His high placing in aeronautical engineering exams offered a career in the Royal Air Force, then expanding to meet the threat of European fascism. After qualifying as a fighter pilot and Flying Boat Captain, he served at RAF Wittering, with 29 (F) Squadron ADGB (Air Defence of Great Britain) in Egypt in 1935. Back in England he was posted to 23 (F) Squadron at RAF Biggin Hill in 1936, and 213 Squadron at Northolt. Northolt was to see the end of his flying career, because on 12 April 1937 he suffered a serious flying accident that left him with extensive third-degree burns and a 6-month spell in hospital. It was not, however, the end of his RAF career, which up to now had been unremarkable. When World War 2 broke out the following year he reported to his old station Biggin Hill, where, with his recent active flying experience, he was invaluable as a controller. By the summer of 1940 he had become a squadron leader, and a legend in the Control Room, a legend much enhanced by the Scharnhorst and Gneisenau affair. Coming on duty at 7 a.m. on 12 February 1942, he noticed aircraft movements seaward of the French port of Brest that the previous controller had dismissed as air-sea rescue, but that he deduced must have been escorting capital ships because of their speed. What he had seen was what British forces were expecting, the break out of a powerful German flotilla which included the Scharnhorst, Gneisenau and Prinz Eugen from Brest, where they had been under heavy attack by Coastal and Bomber Command. A code word had been arranged for this eventuality, and Igoe used it. It was one of the several disasters in the chain of events of this famous Channel Dash that it was not acted upon. An attack by a Royal Naval destroyer, which was badly damaged, and the suicidal assault on the ships by unsuited and slow-moving Fairey Swordfish torpedo aircraft of the Fleet Air arm, commanded by Lieutenant Commander Eugene Esmonde, failed to stop the flotilla from reaching German waters. Controlling had turned him into a specialist in the infant radar equipment, and 1943 saw him posted to command RAF Beachy Head, one of the famous "Chain Home" stations which now became a Fighter Direction Station, and from where he was to spend the rest of the war developing the use of radar for Fighter Control based on the famous "Type 16".

== Business and family ==
In 1937 he met and married Karin Ridsdel, daughter of accountant and financier E. B. Ridsdel. After the war Igoe bought what remained of his father-in-law's business, Ridsdel having died in 1939. It had worldwide interests, notably in Africa, on which he built. In Rhodesia he started a tea plantation industry, which would end up employing some 5,000 people. He also started the carpet manufacturing industry there. He and his wife, who were inseparable, had three sons, the first of whom died in infancy and the other two who survived him. In his lifetime he had seven grandchildren. He held views on political and social issues that were way ahead of his time. He was always entertaining and sharp witted, and never lost the common touch. At his funeral in 1993 the tea estate workers who attended would call him munhu re vanhu – a man of the people.
