= Pete Cowen =

English golfer and coach (born 1951)

Personal information
- Full name: Peter Lewis Cowen
- Nationality: England
- Born: January 1951 (age 75) Sheffield, Yorkshire, England

Career
- Sport: Golf
- Status: Professional
- Former tour: European Tour
- Professional wins: 1

Best results in major championships
- Masters Tournament: DNP
- PGA Championship: DNP
- U.S. Open: DNP
- The Open Championship: T36: 1979

Peter Lewis Cowen (born January 1951) is an English ex-professional golfer and golf coach.

== Professional golfer ==
Cowen played on the European Tour in the 1970s and early 1980s with little success. He finished tied for 6th place in the 1980 Cold Shield Greater Manchester Open after a last round 64. He won the Zambia Open in 1976.

== Golf coach ==
As a coach, Cowen's clients include former world number one Lee Westwood, major champions Rory McIlroy, Graeme McDowell, Louis Oosthuizen, Danny Willett, Sergio García, Darren Clarke, Henrik Stenson, Gary Woodland and Brooks Koepka and many other players on both the PGA Tour and European Tour. He has academies in Rotherham, England and in Dubai. He is also senior coach to the English Golf Union. In 2010, he was UK Coach of the Year, an all-sport award.

== Professional wins ==
- 1976 Zambia Open

== Results in major championships ==
Tournament	1976	1977	1978	1979	1980	1981	1982	1983	1984	1985	1986	1987	1988	1989
The Open Championship	CUT	CUT	CUT	T36			CUT	CUT						CUT

Note: Cowen only played in The Open Championship.

Did not play

CUT = missed the half way cut (3rd round cut in 1976 Open Championship)
"T" indicates a tie for a place

== Team appearances ==
- PGA Cup (representing continental Europe): 1992
