= Tom Williamson (golfer) =

English professional golfer (1880–1950)

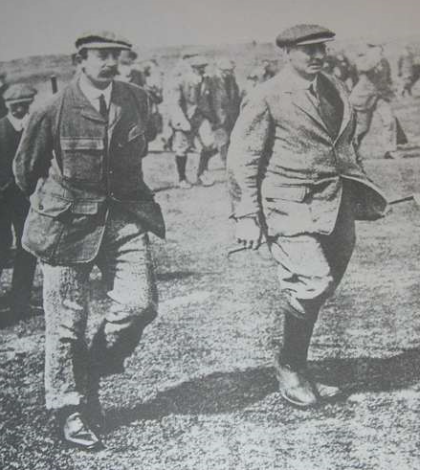
- Williamson (left) and Harry Vardon (right), c. 1913

Personal information
- Nationality: England
- Born: 9 February 1880 Grantham, England
- Died: 4 April 1950 (aged 70) Nottingham, England

Career
- Sport: Golf
- Status: Professional
- Professional wins: 9

Best results in major championships
- Masters Tournament: DNP
- PGA Championship: DNP
- U.S. Open: DNP
- The Open Championship: T4: 1914

Tom Williamson (9 February 1880 – 4 April 1950) was an English professional golfer who played in the early 20th century. Williamson finished in the top 10 in the Open Championship on six occasions and played in it over fifty years. His best performance came in the 1914 Open Championship when he tied for fourth place, six shots behind the winner. With Harry Vardon he won the 1913 Sphere and Tatler Foursomes Tournament by a convincing 7 & 5 margin. He was Captain of England in 1909 and represented England between 1904 and 1913. He won the Midland Professional Championship when it was first held in 1897 and a further six times. He was a renowned club maker and was the first to number clubs in 1906. He experimented with score cards placing a course plan on the reverse side in 1930. He designed sixty courses, the majority in the East Midlands. He was a founder member of the PGA and became its Captain in 1928. He had a good reputation as a teacher and taught Enid Wilson who won the English Ladies Championship three times. He was known as a modest man of integrity.

== Early life ==
Williamson was born in Grantham, England, to Edmund and Lilian on 9 February 1880.

== Golf career ==
Williamson was professional at Notts Golf Club, now Hollinwell (Notts Golf Club), in Nottinghamshire, England, for 54 years. He was a regular competitor in the Open Championship, playing between 1897 and 1947. He last played in 1947. Williamson designed over sixty courses and by 1919 it was said that he had made recommendations to every course within 50 miles of Nottingham. He designed amongst others Stanton-on-the-Wolds Golf Club, Zurich Golf and Country Club, Coombe Park, Wollaton, Hillsborough, Radcliffe-on -Trent and Worksop, and he made substantial alterations to Hollinwell, Kedleston Hall, Sherwood Forest and Burton-on-Trent. He designed other courses in the Midlands as well.

=== 1914 Open Championship ===
The 1914 Open Championship was the 54th Open Championship, held 18–19 June at Prestwick Golf Club in Prestwick, South Ayrshire, Scotland. Harry Vardon won a record sixth Open Championship title, three strokes ahead of runner-up J.H. Taylor, the defending champion. Due to World War I, it was the last Open for six years, the next Open would not be contested until 1920.

==== Details of play ====
Qualification took place on 11 and 12 June, players playing 18 holes each day. 96 players scored 163 or better. The 13 players who scored 164 played a further 18 holes on 13 June to determine the final four places. Vardon led after the first day by one shot from a relatively unknown James Ockenden from West Drayton Golf Club. Taylor was a shot further behind. Vardon and Taylor were drawn together on the final day and, after Ockenden had a disappointing third round 83, they were clear leaders after the third round. Taylor led on 226 with Vardon on 228 and amateur James Jenkins third on 232.

With the two leaders playing together, a large throng of spectators followed their group. Taylor extended his lead to three at the first hole of the final round. At the 3rd hole, however, he was distracted by a photographer and dropped a stroke to Vardon. The Championship was largely decided at the 4th hole where Taylor deposited his ball into a water hazard and took 7 whilst Vardon carded a 4. Williamson played steady golf in the event, finishing tied for fourth place with Abe Mitchell, and won £8 15s. His round-by-round scoring was 75-79-79-79=312.

=== 1921 Open Championship ===
The 1921 Open Championship was the 56th Open Championship, held 23–25 June at the Old Course at St Andrews in St Andrews, Scotland. Former local Jock Hutchison won his only Open Championship, in a 36-hole playoff over amateur Roger Wethered. It was Hutchison's second and final major title. Williamson played fine golf in the event, finishing tied for sixth place. He had rounds of 79-71-74-78=302 and won £6 8s 7d.

=== 1927 Open Championship ===
The 1927 Open Championship was the 62nd Open Championship, held 13–15 July at the Old Course at St Andrews in St Andrews, Scotland. Amateur Bobby Jones successfully defended the title with a dominating six stroke victory, the second of his three victories at the Open Championship. Williamson finished the tournament tied for tenth place.

== Death and legacy ==
Williamson died in Nottingham, England, on 4 April 1950. He is best remembered as a frequent competitor in the Open Championship and for winning the 1913 Sphere and Tatler Foursomes Tournament when he was paired with Harry Vardon. He will also be remembered as the first to number golf clubs.

== Tournament wins ==
Note: This list may be incomplete.

- 1897 Midland Professional Championship
- 1898 Midland Professional Championship
- 1900 Midland Professional Championship
- 1903 Midland Challenge Cup
- 1905 Midland Professional Championship, Midland Challenge Cup
- 1907 Midland Professional Championship
- 1911 Midland Professional Championship
- 1912 Midland Professional Foursomes (with Walter Tedder)
- 1913 Sphere and Tatler Foursomes Tournament (with Harry Vardon)
- 1914 Midland Challenge Cup
- 1919 Midland Challenge Cup
- 1920 Midland Professional Championship
- 1922 Midland Professional Foursomes (with Harry Cawsey), Midland Professional Championship
- 1925 Midland Challenge Cup
- 1926 Midland Amateur and Professional Tournament
- 1927 Midland Challenge Cup

== Results in major championships ==
Tournament	1897	1898	1899
The Open Championship	T37	T21	T9

Tournament	1900	1901	1902	1903	1904	1905	1906	1907	1908	1909
The Open Championship	CUT	CUT	T30	T11	CUT	T13	T19	T7	T35	

Tournament	1910	1911	1912	1913	1914	1915	1916	1917	1918	1919
The Open Championship	T19	CUT	T17	T7	T4	NT	NT	NT	NT	NT

Tournament	1920	1921	1922	1923	1924	1925	1926	1927	1928	1929
The Open Championship	T26	T6	T28	T12	T13		T14	T10	T21	T25

Note: Williamson only played in The Open Championship.

Top 10

NT = No tournament
CUT = missed the half-way cut
"T" indicates a tie for a place

== Team appearances ==
- England–Scotland Professional Match (representing England): 1904 (tie), 1905 (tie), 1906 (winners), 1907 (winners), 1909 (winners), 1910 (winners), 1912 (tie), 1913 (winners)
- Coronation Match (representing the Professionals): 1911 (winners)
- Seniors vs Juniors (representing the Seniors): 1928 (winners)
