= Peter Butler (golfer) =

English professional golfer (1932–2022)

Personal information
- Full name: Peter Joseph Butler
- Nationality: England
- Born: 25 March 1932 Birmingham, West Midlands, England
- Died: 11 October 2022 (aged 90)
- Height: 6 ft 0 in (1.83 m)

Career
- Sport: Golf
- Turned professional: 1947
- Former tours: European Tour; European Seniors Tour
- Professional wins: 26

Number of wins by tour
- European Senior Tour: 1
- Other: 25

Best results in major championships
- Masters Tournament: T13: 1964, 1966
- PGA Championship: DNP
- U.S. Open: DNP
- The Open Championship: 6th: 1973

Peter Joseph Butler (25 March 1932 – 11 October 2022) was an English professional golfer. He was one of the leading British golfers of the 1960s and early 1970s. He won a number of important tournaments including the 1963 PGA Close Championship and the 1968 French Open. He played in four Ryder Cup matches between 1965 and 1973 and three times in the World Cup. He played in the Open Championship 23 times, with two top-10 finishes, and seven successive times in the Masters from 1964 to 1970.

== Professional career ==
Butler turned professional as a teenager in 1947, becoming an assistant to Bill Button at Harborne Golf Club, Birmingham. He played in the 1949 PGA Assistants' Championship, which was restarted that year, but finished a distant 38 strokes behind the winner. He had more success the following year, finishing in 6th place. The leading 16 players qualified for the Gor-Ray match-play tournament which had prize money of £580. Butler lost in the first round. Over the next few years Butler had considerable success at the local level but had limited success at the national level although he was a runner-up in the 1955 Coombe Hill Assistants' Tournament behind Peter Mills.

In 1958, Butler became joint professional with Button at Harborne and played more regularly on the British circuit. He had achieved little success when in May 1959 he was the surprise winner of the Swallow-Penfold Tournament. Rounds of 75-72-67-66 gave him a one stroke win ahead of Harry Weetman and the £1,000 first prize. Butler had trailed Weetman by eight strokes after the first two rounds. Butler had his second important success in 1962, winning the Yorkshire Evening News Tournament four ahead of Ken Bousfield and taking another £1,000 prize. Like his 1959 win, this was also something of a surprise since he had achieved relatively little in the interim period.

Year 1963 started with his third £1,000 win, the Schweppes PGA Close Championship where he finished two strokes ahead of Bobby Walker. The event was played at Royal Birkdale in a strong wind with bare greens. His winning score of 306 was the highest for an important tournament in living memory. Butler trailed John Jacobs by 10 shots at the start of the final day but scored 77 and 76 while Jacobs had two rounds of 83 to drop to third place. Butler was runner-up in the Swallow-Penfold Tournament in May and won the 36-hole Bowmaker Tournament in July. Despite his good season, a number of poor finishes left him 14th in the Ryder Cup rankings, the leading 10 making the team.

Butler spent the early part of 1964 playing on the PGA Tour only returning after the Masters Tournament to which he received an invitation. He was tied for 4th place after three rounds but a final round 75 dropped him out of the top 10. The following week he defended his Schweppes PGA Close Championship title, finishing tied for third, and then won the Cox Moore Tournament the week after, beating Bernard Hunt by a stroke.

Butler returned to America to play in the Carling World Open. After two rounds he was only a stroke behind the leader but he faded in the last two rounds. He was runner-up in the News of the World Match Play, losing 3&2 to Neil Coles. Coles and Butler received invitations to the inaugural Piccadilly World Match Play Championship. Butler played Arnold Palmer and was two up with seven holes to play. Palmer then won four holes in a row and won by one hole. Butler took £1,000 for losing this first-round match.

In early 1965, Butler was the runner-up in the Schweppes PGA Close Championship, losing in a sudden-death playoff to Peter Alliss, and later in May he won the Martini International. Qualification for the 1965 Ryder Cup was based on performances in 1964 and 1965, Butler finishing in third place in the points list to make the team. He had a disappointing Ryder Cup, gaining just two halves in his five matches, although his three losses all went to the final hole. The Ryder Cup was immediately followed by the Piccadilly Medal which Butler won by two strokes from Dai Rees.

Year 1966 was a disappointing season although he started well in both the Masters Tournament and the Open Championship. In the Masters he was the 36-hole co-leader before finishing tied for 13th. He was second, behind Jack Nicklaus, at the half-way stage of the Open but finished with rounds of 80 and 75 to drop into joint 15th place. Butler had a better start to 1967 finishing runner-up in the Agfa-Gevaert Tournament and the French Open. He also won the Bowmaker Tournament for the second time with a final round of 61. Butler's poor 1966 season meant he was outside the top-10 in the Ryder Cup points list and he missed out on a place in the 1967 Ryder Cup. The year finished on a successful note with a win in the Piccadilly Medal.

Butler had one of his best seasons in 1968, winning the Penfold Tournament, after beating Dave Thomas in a playoff, the Open de France and the W.D. & H.O. Wills Tournament and finishing second in the Order of Merit. Butler made the team for the 1969 Ryder Cup as one of the leading six players in the Order of Merit in late July. In August 1969, he had his first important win in Ireland, the R.T.V. International Trophy. The win took him to the top of the Order of Merit and he was selected to represent England in the World Cup. Butler was runner-up in the Dunlop Masters the week before the Ryder Cup. In the Ryder Cup, Butler lost his foursomes and fourball matches, both at the final hole, but won both his singles matches on the final day to help Britain to tie the match.

Although he had a less successful season, Butler was again selected to play in the 1970 World Cup in Argentina. In August 1971, Butler won the Classic International, an event he had helped to organise, and lost in a playoff to Tony Jacklin in the Benson & Hedges Festival of Golf. As in 1969, Butler was one of the leading six in the Order of Merit when the 1971 Ryder Cup was selected in late August and made the team automatically. He played in both the foursomes sessions on the opening day, winning one and losing the other. He was then ill and didn't play on the other two days.

Butler played regularly on the European Tour from its foundation in 1972 until 1979. He never won on the tour but was runner-up four times, twice in 1972 at the John Player Trophy and the W.D. & H.O. Wills Tournament and in the 1975 Sun Alliance Match Play Championship, where he lost at the 23rd hole of the final, and the 1977 Callers of Newcastle, where he lost a four-man playoff. He was 7th in the Order of Merit in 1972 and 11th in 1973. He had his best finish in the Open in 1973 finishing in sixth place. Qualification for most of the 1973 Ryder Cup team was based on performances in events in 1972 and 1973 and Butler finished in the sixth place in the final table to ensure his place. At the Ryder Cup at Muirfield, he recorded the first ever hole-in-one in the history of the event. Butler also played in the 1973 World Cup in Marbella, Spain.

After turning 50, Butler was a regular competitor in the PGA Seniors Championship. He was runner-up four times, in 1982, 1984, 1986 and 1989, losing in a four-man sudden-death playoff in 1982, just two months after his 50th birthday. He was one of the founders of the European Seniors Tour and finished fourth on the Order of Merit in its 1992 debut season, even though, at sixty, he was ten years past the minimum age. His only senior win came at the 1993 Lawrence Batley Seniors, having been a runner-up in the event the previous season.

Butler was captain of the PGA in 1972.

== Personal life ==
Butler married Doreen Houghton in 1961. They had a daughter Verity. Butler died in October 2022, at the age of 90.

== Professional wins (26) ==
=== British PGA circuit wins (14) ===
No.	Date	Tournament	Winning score	Margin of victory	Runner(s)-up	Ref.
1	23 May 1959	Swallow-Penfold Tournament	75-72-67-66=280	1 stroke	(England) Harry Weetman	
2	23 Jun 1962	Yorkshire Evening News Tournament	70-69-67-67=273	4 strokes	(England) Ken Bousfield	
3	6 Apr 1963	Schweppes PGA Close Championship	74-79-77-76=306	2 strokes	(Scotland) Bobby Walker	
4	2 Jul 1963	Bowmaker Tournament	65-67=132	2 strokes	(England) Ken Bousfield, (Wales) Brian Huggett, (Australia) Kel Nagle	
5	25 Apr 1964	Cox Moore Tournament	70-68-72-69=279	1 stroke	(England) Bernard Hunt	
6	22 May 1965	Martini International	70-69-67-69=275	4 strokes	(France) Jean Garaïalde, (England) Bernard Hunt	
7	12 Oct 1965	Piccadilly Tournament	68-65-65-69=267	2 strokes	(Wales) Dai Rees	
8	4 Jul 1967	Bowmaker Tournament	70-61=131	1 stroke	(Australia) Peter Thomson	
9	11 Oct 1967	Piccadilly Tournament	68-67-64-64=263	2 strokes	(Wales) Brian Huggett	
10	4 May 1968	Penfold Tournament	68-75-66-72=281	Playoff	(Wales) Dave Thomas	
11	18 Jul 1968	French Open	67-68-68-69=272	4 strokes	(Spain) Sebastián Miguel, (England) Peter Townsend	
12	17 Aug 1968	W.D. & H.O. Wills Tournament	67-70-72-72=281	2 strokes	(England) Bill Large	
13	10 Aug 1969	R.T.V. International Trophy	67-67-68-71=273	3 strokes	(England) Bernard Hunt, (South Africa) Cobie Legrange	
14	7 Aug 1971	Classic International	68-74-68-67=277	1 stroke	(Wales) Kim Dabson	

=== Other wins (11) ===
- 1956 Midland Open Championship
- 1958 Midland Open Championship
- 1960 Midland Open Championship
- 1961 Midland Professional Championship
- 1963 Gleneagles Hotel Foursomes Tournament (with David Kelley)
- 1965 Midland Open Championship
- 1969 Midland Open Championship
- 1971 Grand Bahama Open
- 1972 Grand Bahama Open
- 1974 Sumrie-Bournemouth Better-Ball (with Clive Clark)
- 1975 Colombian Open

=== European Senior Tour wins (1) ===
No.	Date	Tournament	Winning score	Margin of victory	Runner-up
1	30 Jul 1993	Lawrence Batley Seniors	−5 (70-65-72=207)	1 stroke	(Republic of Ireland) Michael Murphy

== Playoff record ==
European Tour playoff record (0–1)

No.	Year	Tournament	Opponents	Result
1	1977	Callers of Newcastle	(South Africa) John Fourie, (Spain) Ángel Gallardo, (England) Tommy Horton	Fourie won with par on second extra hole Butler and Horton eliminated by par on first hole

== Results in major championships ==
Tournament	1954	1955	1956	1957	1958	1959
Masters Tournament						
The Open Championship	CUT		CUT	T30	CUT	

Tournament	1960	1961	1962	1963	1964	1965	1966	1967	1968	1969
Masters Tournament					T13	CUT	T13	T24	CUT	CUT
The Open Championship	35	T20	CUT	CUT	T30	CUT	T16	CUT	CUT	CUT

Tournament	1970	1971	1972	1973	1974	1975	1976	1977	1978	1979
Masters Tournament	CUT									
The Open Championship	CUT	T25	T15	6	31		T10	T15	59	CUT

Note: Butler only played in the Masters Tournament and The Open Championship.

Top 10
Did not play

CUT = Missed the half-way cut (3rd round cut in 1968, 1970 and 1979 Open Championships)
"T" indicates a tie for a place

=== Summary ===
Tournament	Wins	2nd	3rd	Top-5	Top-10	Top-25	Events	Cuts made
Masters Tournament	0	0	0	0	0	3	7	3
U.S. Open	0	0	0	0	0	0	0	0
The Open Championship	0	0	0	0	2	7	23	12
PGA Championship	0	0	0	0	0	0	0	0
Totals	0	0	0	0	2	10	30	15

- Most consecutive cuts made – 7 (1971 Open Championship – 1978 Open Championship)
- Longest streak of top-10s – 1 (twice)

== Team appearances ==
- Ryder Cup (representing Great Britain & Ireland): 1965, 1969 (tie), 1971, 1973
- World Cup (representing England): 1969, 1970, 1973
- Amateurs–Professionals Match (representing the Professionals): 1960 (winners)
- Double Diamond International (representing England): 1971 (winners), 1972 (winners), 1976 (winners)
- Philip Morris International (representing England): 1976
- Hennessy Cognac Cup (representing Great Britain and Ireland): 1976 (winners)
- PGA Cup (representing Great Britain and Ireland): 1978 (winners), 1979 (winners), 1981, 1982, 1984 (winners)
