= Arthur Lees =

English professional golfer

Personal information
- Nationality: England
- Born: 21 February 1908 Sheffield, South Yorkshire
- Died: 26 March 1992 (aged 84) Windsor, Berkshire

Career
- Sport: Golf
- Status: Professional
- Professional wins: 9

Best results in major championships
- Masters Tournament: DNP
- PGA Championship: DNP
- U.S. Open: DNP
- The Open Championship: T6: 1947, 1949

Arthur Lees (21 February 1908 – 26 March 1992) was an English professional golfer who played from the 1930s to 1960s. He was a member of four Great Britain Ryder Cup teams in the late 1940s and 1950s, and won several tournaments in Europe during his career. In addition, he spent nearly 30 years as the head professional of Sunningdale Golf Club, holding the position until he was almost 70 years old.

== Early life ==
Lees first took up golf in his youth, serving as a caddie at Lees Hall Club in Sheffield. When the player he worked for was practising, Lees would hit balls to him with a golf club.

== Professional career ==
At the age of 15, the club hired Lees as an assistant pro. He later accepted a job as the professional at Marienbad in Czechoslovakia. In late 1934 he went back to Sheffield and began working at Dore and Totley, replacing Harry Dean. He also found success in local tournaments in 1935, winning Yorkshire's open and pro golf championships. Lees made his first of 16 appearances in The Open Championship in 1935, finishing in a tie for 41st. At the 1935 Czechoslovak Open, Lees was the first- and second-round leader and placed second behind Mark Seymour. Two years later, he finished joint second at the same event, five strokes in back of Henry Cotton.

In 1938, Lees recorded a third-place finish in the Irish Open, having once held the lead; he also finished second in the Dunlop-Southport Tournament. At the 1938 England–Scotland Professional Match, Lees was part of the winning English team. Reg Whitcombe and Lees won a foursomes match, before Lees lost to John Donaldson in singles play. The following year, he held a share of the lead in the same tournament after three rounds, having posted scores of 69–72–74. Another 72 in the final round gave Lees the victory by two strokes over Whitcombe. Prior to the Second World War, he added a second-place result at the German Open.

=== Ryder Cup experience ===
In September 1947, Lees was selected for the Great Britain Ryder Cup team. Lees' first Ryder Cup match was in foursomes, where Cotton was his partner against the team of Porky Oliver and Lew Worsham; the British team lost 10&9. He was also defeated in singles play, by Byron Nelson, in the Americans' 11–1 victory. Also in 1947, Lees won the Dunlop Masters tournament, and finished the Open Championship in a tie for sixth place, having held a share of the lead entering the final round. Two years later, he repeated his joint sixth-place Open Championship finish from 1947, and again played in a Ryder Cup. This time, he won his first match, in foursomes, as he and Dick Burton defeated Lloyd Mangrum and Sam Snead by a 1-up margin. Lees again lost in singles play, 7&6, to Jimmy Demaret. The following year, 1950, saw him lead following the opening round of the Open Championship at Royal Troon; he ended the tournament tied for seventh. For the season, Lees was the second-place finisher in the British golf circuit's order of merit standings.

In 1951, Lees claimed a victory in the Penfold Tournament and gained a place in his third Ryder Cup team. At the 1951 Ryder Cup, he started off in foursomes, teamed with Charlie Ward and the pair posted a 2&1 victory against the American duo of Oliver and Henry Ransom. Lees then won his singles match 2&1 over Oliver. In the 9½–2½ US victory, he took part in both of Great Britain's match wins. Lees won the Penfold Tournament for the second time in 1953; despite this; he was not selected for Britain's 1953 Ryder Cup team. At the 1954 Dubtex Tournament in Ireland, Lees shot a 66 in the third round to set a Portmarnock Golf Club scoring record, en route to tying for first place in the event with Christy Greene. He returned to the British Ryder Cup team in 1955, at the age of 47. In team play, Tommy Bolt and Jack Burke Jr. defeated Lees and Harry Weetman 1-up, but Lees won the final Ryder Cup match he played in, 3&1, against Ed Furgol. The Times later wrote of his Cup performances, "It was an era when the United States made a habit of overpowering any British team, but Lees emerged with his head high."

=== Later career ===
In 1949, following the death of Percy Boomer, Sunningdale Golf Club hired Lees as its club professional. At the time, Sunningdale was still feeling the effects of the Second World War, as its membership was low. Lees improved the situation by attracting new members; The Times later wrote that he took on the role of "self-appointed recruiting agent." Lees performed his head professional duties for the club even during his playing career. One of his assistants was future professional golfer Sam Torrance, who was 16 when Lees gave him the job. Lees remained the head pro at Sunningdale until 1977.

In addition, Lees still played high-level golf during this timespan. Lees set or tied multiple course records during the 1956 British golf season. In the Dunlop Tournament held at Sunningdale Golf Club, his home club, he matched the existing New Course low score with a 65. During a qualifier in Stoneham for the News of the World Match Play tournament—which doubled as Britain's southern championship—he shot another 65 to break a record, and won the event. Lees also took part in multiple team competitions that year. In the Slazenger Trophy versus a team representing the Commonwealth, he lost his singles match to Frank Buckler in what The Glasgow Herald called "The biggest surprise" of the round; the British team still won, 7–5. At the Amateurs–Professionals Match, Lees halved his foursomes match and won 6&5 in the singles to help the Professionals win the event.

In 1959, Lees won the British PGA Seniors Championship, and in June of that year faced Senior PGA Championship winner Willie Goggin in a match for what was billed as "the world professional senior golf title". To boost attendance, the final 18 holes of the match were scheduled to be played at night. In what the Associated Press called "the first twilight championship match on record," Lees lost to Goggin by a 5&3 score. Lees competed in his last Open Championship in 1963, and continued playing golf into his eighties.

== Personal life ==
By 1977, Lees was suffering from bladder cancer and had surgery on it, ultimately recovering. He died in 1992 at the age of 84.

Arthur's younger brothers, Harold (1912–1989) and Walter (1916–2012), were also professional golfers. Harold replaced Arthur as professional at Dore and Totley in 1949, having previously been his assistant there. With Walter becoming professional at Shipley in 1948, all three brothers became full professionals for the first time. Harold was less successful than his brothers as a tournament golfer but he did qualify for the 1956 Open Championship, missing the cut by 3 shots.

His nephew, Raymond Lees (1938–2025), also became a club professional, working at Stavanger Golf Club for 40 years.

== Professional wins ==
this list is incomplete

- 1939 Irish Open
- 1947 Dunlop Masters
- 1948 Midland Professional Championship
- 1949 Midland Professional Championship
- 1951 Penfold-Bournemouth Festival of Britain Tournament
- 1953 Penfold Tournament
- 1954 Dubtex Tournament (Ireland) (tie with Christy Greene)
- 1956 Southern Professional Championship
- 1959 PGA Seniors Championship

== Results in major championships ==
Tournament	1935	1936	1937	1938	1939
The Open Championship	T41	39		CUT	CUT

Tournament	1940	1941	1942	1943	1944	1945	1946	1947	1948	1949
The Open Championship	NT	NT	NT	NT	NT	NT	T18	T6	T11	T6

Tournament	1950	1951	1952	1953	1954	1955	1956	1957	1958	1959
The Open Championship	T7	T31	T9	13		CUT		45		

Tournament	1960	1961	1962	1963
The Open Championship			CUT	CUT

Note: Lees only played in The Open Championship.

Top 10
Did not play

NT = No tournament
CUT = missed the half-way cut
"T" indicates a tie for a place

== Team appearances ==
- Ryder Cup (representing Great Britain and Ireland): 1947, 1949, 1951, 1955
- England–Scotland Professional Match (representing England): 1938 (winners)
- Llandudno International Golf Trophy (representing England): 1938 (winners)
- Slazenger Trophy (representing Great Britain and Ireland): 1956 (winners)
- Amateurs–Professionals Match (representing the Professionals): 1956 (winners)

== Sources ==
- Feherty, David; Frank, James A. (2004). David Feherty's Totally Subjective History of the Ryder Cup. New York City: Rugged Land. ISBN 1-59071-032-0.
