= Jack Oke =

English golfer (1880–1950)

Personal information
- Full name: John Henry Oke
- Nationality: England
- Born: 1 May 1880 Northam, Devon, England
- Died: 8 March 1950 (aged 69) Jacksonville, Florida

Career
- Sport: Golf
- Status: Professional
- Professional wins: 1

Best results in major championships
- Masters Tournament: DNP
- PGA Championship: DNP
- U.S. Open: T43: 1905
- The Open Championship: T15: 1901

John Henry Oke (1 May 1880 – 8 March 1950) was an English professional golfer. He won the first Canadian Open in 1904. His brother, George (1892–1947), was also a professional golfer and was president of the PGA in 1930/31.

Oke was born in Northam, Devon near Royal North Devon Golf Club. By 1899 he was an assistant to J. H. Taylor at Mid-Surrey Golf Club. He entered the Open Championship from 1901 to 1903, finishing tied for 15th place in 1901 and tied for 29th in 1903. Oke was the professional at Royal Ottawa Golf Club in 1904 and 1905, during which time he won the first Canadian Open.

In 1906 Oke became the professional at Sutton Coldfield Golf Club, just north of Birmingham where he remained until moving to North Hants Golf Club in Fleet, Hampshire in 1912. During his period at Sutton Coldfield he was a regular competitor in tournaments. As well as playing in the Open Championship, he qualified for the final stages of the News of the World Match Play in 1906, 1907 and 1908 and was runner-up in the Midland Professional Championship in 1910 and 1911.

Oke left for the United States in April 1915 and played in the U.S. Open that year. He remained in America until his death in 1950, from cancer of the throat. He held a number of posts before his retirement in 1948.

== Professional wins (1) ==
Note: This list may be incomplete.

- 1904 Canadian Open

== Results in major championships ==
Tournament	1901	1902	1903	1904	1905	1906	1907	1908	1909	1910	1911	1912	1913	1914	1915
U.S. Open					T43										CUT
The Open Championship	T15	CUT	T29			T38	T30			?	CUT				

Note: Oke never played in the Masters Tournament or the PGA Championship.

Did not play

CUT = Missed the cut
"T" indicates a tie for a place
