= David Snell (golfer) =

English golfer (1933–2021)

Personal information
- Full name: David Snell
- Nationality: England
- Born: 10 October 1933 Worksop, Nottinghamshire, England
- Died: 15 July 2021 (aged 87) Worksop, Nottinghamshire, England
- Height: 5 ft 6 in (1.68 m)

Career
- Sport: Golf
- Turned professional: 1949
- Former tours: European Tour; European Senior Tour
- Professional wins: 5

Best results in major championships
- Masters Tournament: DNP
- PGA Championship: DNP
- U.S. Open: DNP
- The Open Championship: T30: 1958

David Snell (10 October 1933 – 15 July 2021) was an English professional golfer who won the 1959 News of the World Matchplay, the British matchplay championship. Despite this win he was not selected for the British 1959 Ryder Cup team.

== Professional career ==
Snell was an assistant professional at Lindrick Golf Club before becoming the professional at Worksop Golf Club in the mid-1950.

Snell won the News of the World Matchplay in September 1959 at Royal Birkdale. He beat the defending champion, Harry Weetman, 3 & 2 in the 36-hole final, taking the first prize of £750. Seven members of the British team for the 1959 Ryder Cup were selected from a points system based on performances during the early part of the 1959 season, ending with Irish Hospitals Tournament finishing on 12 July. The remaining three were selected by the P.G.A. tournament committee after the Dunlop Masters, which was played the week after the News of the World Matchplay. Snell performed poorly in the Dunlop Masters, and was not chosen, with the committee preferring Ken Bousfield, Eric Brown and Dave Thomas. In contrast, in both 1957 and 1961, any British or Irish winner of the News of the World Matchplay received an automatic place in the team.

Snell was a joint runner-up in the 1959 PGA Close Championship, played at Ashburnham in Wales, finishing six strokes behind Dai Rees. He tied for the 1963 Rediffusion Tournament on Jersey but lost in the playoff to Alex Caygill at the second extra hole, sharing second place with Flory Van Donck. He was also runner-up to Jimmy Hitchcock in the 1965 Agfa-Gevaert Tournament and to Tony Jacklin in the 1967 Pringle of Scotland Tournament.

Snell played for the professionals in the last Amateurs–Professionals Match in 1960. He also played for England in the 1965 Canada Cup in Madrid, with Guy Wolstenholme. They finished in a tie for fourth place. Snell had a final round of 68 to equal the best round of the tournament.

Snell was a regular competitor in the Open Championship, qualifying for 17 successive championships from 1957 to 1973. His best finish was a tie for 30th place in 1958.

Despite being in his late 50s when it was formed in 1992, Snell played for a number of years on the European Senior Tour. He never won on the tour, his best finish being runner-up in the La Manga Spanish Seniors Open in 1994, where he was involved in a three-way playoff with Brian Huggett and Malcolm Gregson. He finished 13th in the order of merit in both 1993 and 1994.

== Personal life ==
In the 1990s Snell designed and built College Pines Golf Club, near Worksop. He was only 5 ft 6 in (168 cm) tall and was noted for his long swing.

Snell died on 15 July 2021, at the age of 87.

== Tournament wins ==
- 1957 Midland Professional Championship
- 1959 News of the World Match Play, Midland Open Championship
- 1963 Sunningdale Foursomes (with Lionel Platts)
- 1966 Midland Open Championship

== Results in major championships ==
Tournament	1957	1958	1959	1960	1961	1962	1963	1964	1965	1966	1967	1968	1969	1970	1971	1972	1973
The Open Championship	CUT	T30	CUT	CUT	T41	CUT	CUT	CUT	CUT	T37	T31	CUT	CUT	CUT	T58	CUT	CUT

Note: Snell only played in The Open Championship.
CUT = missed the half-way cut (3rd round cut in 1969, 1972 and 1973 Open Championships)
"T" indicates a tie for a place

== Team appearances ==
- Amateurs–Professionals Match (representing the Professionals): 1960 (winners)
- Canada Cup (representing England): 1965
