= Walter Lees (golfer) =

English golfer (1916–2012)

Personal information
- Nationality: England
- Born: 14 December 1916 Sheffield, West Riding of Yorkshire, England
- Died: 9 July 2012 (aged 95) Shipley, West Yorkshire, England

Career
- Sport: Golf
- Status: Professional
- Professional wins: 1

Best results in major championships
- Masters Tournament: DNP
- PGA Championship: DNP
- U.S. Open: DNP
- The Open Championship: 17th: 1949

Walter Lees (14 December 1916 – 9 July 2012) was an English professional golfer. He was the younger brother of Arthur and Harold, both professional golfers.

Lees won the 1946 Midland Professional Championship at Sandwell Park Golf Club, 4 strokes ahead of Jack Cawsey and Leslie Cliffe. He was runner-up in the 1949 Yorkshire Evening News Tournament at Moortown Golf Club. The tournament was run as a match-play event that year and Lees won five matches to reach the final, beating Roberto De Vicenzo, Jimmy Adams and Dai Rees. Having beaten Rees in the morning, he met Sam King In the afternoon final. One down after 8 holes he lost the next five to give King a 6&5 victory. The next month he finished 17th in the Open Championship. He had been in 6th place after a good third round 69, just two shots behind the leaders, but a last round 78 dropped his down the field.

Lees was an assistant at Abbeydale Golf Club from 1933 but after the war he was an assistant to his brother Arthur at Dore and Totley. He became the professional at Shipley Golf Club in 1948 and was there until he retired in 1985.

== Professional wins ==
- 1946 Midland Professional Championship

== Results in major championships ==
Tournament	1947	1948	1949
The Open Championship	CUT	CUT	17

Tournament	1950	1951	1952	1953	1954	1955	1956	1957	1958	1959
The Open Championship		CUT	CUT	CUT	CUT	CUT		CUT		

Tournament	1960	1961	1962
The Open Championship			CUT

Note: Lees only played in The Open Championship.

Did not play

CUT = missed the half-way cut
