= Ted Douglas =

Scottish professional golfer

Personal information
- Full name: Edward Simpson Douglas
- Nationality: Scotland
- Born: 30 May 1885 Nairn, Scotland
- Died: 23 December 1956 (aged 71)

Career
- Sport: Golf
- Status: Professional
- Professional wins: 10

Best results in major championships
- Masters Tournament: DNP
- PGA Championship: DNP
- U.S. Open: DNP
- The Open Championship: T24: 1926

Edward Simpson Douglas (30 May 1885 – 23 December 1956) was a Scottish professional golfer. Douglas began his career in his native Scotland before briefly moving to the United States. Shortly thereafter, he moved the New Zealand where he became a top touring professional, winning the New Zealand Open four times and a number of other prominent titles. By 1925, he was described as the "finest golfer New Zealand ever had."

== Professional career ==
He was born Edward Simpson Douglas. Douglas is from Scotland. During his early years in Scotland he was associated with Newton More Club in Perthshire and Fort George Club in Morayshire. Douglas had some success as a young professional while in Scotland. At the age of 20, he finished in the top-20 at the Scottish Professional Championship held at Cardross.

At the age of 22, he moved to the United States. He lived in the United States for 5 years. He worked at Preselio Club and Menlo Park Club, both in San Francisco, for three and two years respectively. He enjoyed the experience at Menlo more. He also played in professional tournaments in California, finishing in third place at Del Monte and fourth place at Ingleside. He was in the money at every event he played in America.

In 1912, Douglas arrived in New Zealand. He started his career at the Nelson Club. Douglas was supposed to be introduced to the New Zealand golf world through a match with leading golfer Joe Clements. However, in a "preliminary" session, Clements was so intimidated with Douglas' talents that he called the match off. In 1913, Douglas won the New Zealand Open for the first time. In 1914, he played in the tournament again. He was five shots behind A.D.S. Duncan entering the final round at Auckland Golf Club. He came back, however, and defeated Duncan to successfully defend his championship. At the Heretaunga tournament, he performed another great comeback. After two rounds, he was well back of the lead. Douglas, however, finished with rounds of 70 and 71 to narrowly defeat the second round leader, Shirley Isles. He finished at 296. He also won the Auckland tournament that year.

In 1915, Douglas was conscripted by the United Kingdom to serve in World War I. He served for the N.Z.E.F. in France for three and half years with the Rifle Brigade. He did not play golf during this period. His service ended in 1919.

In 1919, Douglas returned to New Zealand. He was keen to return to New Zealand for its "reconstruction" period. During this period he worked full-time as a golf coach and clubmaker. Douglas still worked extensively as a touring professional. He played at the 1919 New Zealand Open as the two-time defending champion. He was one of only six professionals to attend the event. Sloan Morpeth, himself a veteran recently returning from service in France, held a 10-shot lead over Douglas entering the final round. Douglas played well in the final round to equal Morpeth at the end of regulation. Douglas went on to defeat Morpeth in the playoff 82–85. By 1920, he was considered the best golfer who consistently played events in New Zealand, even better than Australian Joe Kirkwood Sr., future PGA Tour star. In 1921, he again won the New Zealand Open and also the Shirley tournament. During this period, he was affiliated with Miramar Golf Club. As of 1922, he was in the money at every tournament he ever played in New Zealand. During this time, he was considered the best golfer in the country and "almost unbeatable."

In 1922, he decided to return to Scotland. He wanted to play against the best players in the world in Britain. It was also his intention to practice full-time – an opportunity he never had in New Zealand – for six months to hone his game. On 29 July 1922, he took a ship back to Britain. He had some high placings in his native country. In 1925, he finished third in the Northern Professional Championship, four shots behind Abe Mitchell. He was also one of the top golfers in the Daily Mail tournament. He successfully qualified for the 1925 Open Championship, finishing 14th out of 200 potential qualifiers. He was predicted by an English golf writer as one of the favorites to win the event. He was not close to winning however, shooting 83–78 on the first day, putting him 16 shots behind Macdonald Smith's lead. Douglas then withdrew from the tournament. In 1926, he won the Midland Professional Championship.

As of February 1929, he had returned to New Zealand. Late in his career, he still had some success. In 1933, he finished the New Zealand Open tied with Ernie Moss. However, Moss defeated him 146–156 in the playoff. In 1941, he won the Otago Veterans' Golf Four-ball handily with partner K. Ross. They defeated competitors A. Sime and W.G. Wight, 14 and 13, over four rounds. During this era, Douglas was also the head professional at Otago.

== Professional wins (10) ==
- 1913 New Zealand Open
- 1914 New Zealand Open, New Zealand Professional Championship, Wellington Tournament
- 1919 New Zealand Open
- 1921 New Zealand Open, New Zealand Professional Championship
- 1926 Midland Professional Championship
- 1937 New Zealand Professional Championship
- 1941 Otago Veterans' Golf Four-ball
