= Freddie Beck =

English golfer

Personal information
- Full name: Alfred Gibson Beck
- Nationality: England
- Born: 26 January 1904 Filey, Yorkshire, England
- Died: August 1987 (aged 83) Yorkshire, England

Career
- Sport: Golf
- Status: Professional
- Professional wins: 1

Best results in major championships
- Masters Tournament: DNP
- PGA Championship: DNP
- U.S. Open: DNP
- The Open Championship: T21: 1934

Alfred Gibson Beck (26 January 1904 – August 1987) was an English professional golfer. He was generally known as Freddie. He was the son of a professional golfer, Alfred Ward Beck (known as Fred). Freddie had a younger brother William Arthur Beck (known as Arthur) and an uncle, Thomas Helier Beck, who were also professional golfers.

Beck was born in Filey where his father was the professional for 47 years until he retired in 1946. He was an assistant to his father before moving to Halifax Bradley Hall Golf Club in 1926 and to Sherwood Forest Golf Club in 1929. In 1946 he moved to Leicestershire Golf Club.

Beck reached the semi-final of the 1929 News of the World Match Play at Wentworth. He won the Dunlop-Midland Professional Championship in 1937 having been runner-up the previous year. Beck played for England in the Llandudno International Golf Trophy in 1938.

== Tournament wins ==
- 1937 Dunlop-Midland Professional Championship

== Results in major championships ==
| Tournament | 1925 | 1926 | 1927 | 1928 | 1929 | 1930 | 1931 | 1932 | 1933 | 1934 | 1935 | 1936 | 1937 | 1938 | 1939 |
|---|---|---|---|---|---|---|---|---|---|---|---|---|---|---|---|
| The Open Championship | T54 | | | | | CUT | CUT | T25 | | T21 | T27 | CUT | | 31 | |

| Tournament | 1940 | 1941 | 1942 | 1943 | 1944 | 1945 | 1946 | 1947 | 1948 | 1949 | 1950 | 1951 | 1952 |
|---|---|---|---|---|---|---|---|---|---|---|---|---|---|
| The Open Championship | NT | NT | NT | NT | NT | NT | | CUT | | CUT | | | CUT |

Note: Beck only played in The Open Championship.

Did not play

NT = No tournament
CUT = missed the half-way cut
"T" indicates a tie for a place

== Team appearances ==
- Llandudno International Golf Trophy (representing England): 1938 (winners)
