= Bert Gadd =

English golfer (1909–2003)

Personal information
- Full name: Albert Gadd
- Nationality: England
- Born: 31 May 1909 Upton-upon-Severn, Worcestershire, England
- Died: November 2003 (aged 94) Lancashire, England

Career
- Sport: Golf
- Turned professional: 1923
- Professional wins: 15

Best results in major championships
- Masters Tournament: DNP
- PGA Championship: DNP
- U.S. Open: DNP
- The Open Championship: T4: 1935

Albert Gadd (31 May 1909 – November 2003) was an English professional golfer. He won the French Open in 1933, the Irish Open in 1937 and twice finished in the top 10 in The Open Championship.

Gadd was one of a number of golfing brothers, including George who was in the 1927 Ryder Cup team.

== Tournament wins ==
- 1932 Staffordshire Professional Championship
- 1933 Open de France
- 1934 Midland Open
- 1935 Midland Open
- 1937 Irish Open, Dunlop-Northern Tournament
- 1946 Northumberland and Durham Professional Championship
- 1950 Northumberland and Durham Open
- 1953 Northumberland and Durham Open
- 1955 Northumberland and Durham Professional Championship, Northumberland and Durham Open
- 1956 Northumberland and Durham Professional Championship, Northumberland and Durham Open
- 1957 Northumberland and Durham Professional Championship
- 1959 Northumberland and Durham Professional Championship

== Results in major championships ==
Tournament	1932	1933	1934	1935	1936	1937	1938	1939	1940	1941	1942	1943	1944	1945	1946	1947	1948	1949	1950	1951	1952
The Open Championship	CUT	T22	T21	T4	T21	CUT	T10	CUT	NT	NT	NT	NT	NT	NT		WD					CUT

Note: Gadd only played in The Open Championship.

Top 10
Did not play

NT = No tournament
WD = withdrew
CUT = missed the half-way cut
"T" indicates a tie for a place

== Team appearances ==
- England–Scotland Professional Match (representing England): 1933 (winners), 1935 (winners)
- England–Ireland Professional Match (representing England): 1933 (winners)
- Llandudno International Golf Trophy (representing England): 1938 (winners)
