= George Buckle =

English golfer (1886–1957)

Personal information
- Full name: George Russell Buckle
- Nationality: England
- Born: 1886 Nutfield, Surrey, England
- Died: 10 April 1957 (aged 71) Solihull, Warwickshire, England

Career
- Sport: Golf
- Status: Professional
- Professional wins: 5

Best results in major championships
- Masters Tournament: DNP
- PGA Championship: DNP
- U.S. Open: DNP
- The Open Championship: T9: 1920

George Russell Buckle (1886 – 10 April 1957) was an English professional golfer. He was the son of William Buckle, who was the professional at Church Stretton from 1900 to 1911.

Buckle tied for 9th place in the 1920 Open Championship. He was one of the runners-up in the 1925 Daily Mail Tournament at Notts Golf Club, one shot behind the winner, Charles Johns.

Buckle won the Midland Professional Championship four times and was runner-up on five other occasions. In 1926 he won the West of England Professional Championship at Long Ashton by 6 strokes.

== Professional wins ==
- 1912 Midland Professional Championship
- 1923 Midland Professional Championship
- 1925 Midland Professional Championship
- 1926 West of England Professional Championship
- 1929 Midland Professional Championship

== Results in major championships ==
Tournament	1910	1911	1912	1913	1914	1915	1916	1917	1918	1919
The Open Championship	WD			T30		NT	NT	NT	NT	NT

Tournament	1920	1921	1922	1923	1924	1925	1926	1927	1928	1929
The Open Championship	T9	T45	T53	T40	WD			T17	CUT	

Tournament	1930	1931	1932	1933	1934	1935	1936	1937
The Open Championship								CUT

Note: Buckle only played in The Open Championship.

Top 10
Did not play

NT = No tournament
WD = withdrew
CUT = missed the half-way cut
"T" indicates a tie for a place
