= Frank Weston (golfer) =

English golfer (1894–1963)

Personal information
- Full name: Percy Frank Weston
- Nationality: England
- Born: 27 October 1894 Oadby, Leicestershire, England
- Died: 4 February 1963 (aged 68) Leicester, England

Career
- Sport: Golf
- Status: Professional
- Professional wins: 1

Best results in major championships
- Masters Tournament: DNP
- PGA Championship: DNP
- U.S. Open: DNP
- The Open Championship: T9: 1924

Percy Frank Weston (27 October 1894 – 4 February 1963) was an English professional golfer. He tied for 9th place in the 1924 Open Championship. In 1928 he won the Midland Professional Championship. Five players had tied on 149 after the 36 holes but Weston won the 18-hole playoff scoring 74, two ahead of second place Dick Wheildon.

== Tournament wins ==
- 1928 Midland Professional Championship

== Results in major championships ==
Tournament	1924	1925	1926	1927	1928	1929	1930	1931	1932	1933	1934	1935	1936
The Open Championship	T9		CUT				T32		T29		T21		CUT

Note: Weston only played in The Open Championship.

Top 10
Did not play

CUT = missed the half-way cut
"T" indicates a tie for a place
