= Tom Barber (golfer) =

English golfer

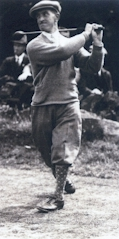

Personal information
- Full name: Thomas Barber
- Nationality: England
- Born: 1894 Knutsford, Cheshire, England
- Died: 31 December 1936 (aged 42) Knokke-Heist, Belgium

Career
- Sport: Golf
- Turned professional: 1913
- Professional wins: 2

Best results in major championships
- Masters Tournament: DNP
- PGA Championship: DNP
- U.S. Open: DNP
- The Open Championship: T5: 1926

Thomas Barber (1894 – 31 December 1936) was an English professional golfer. Although he never won a major tournament, he was runner-up in 1931 Yorkshire Evening News Tournament and twice finished in the top 10 in The Open Championship.

== Golf career ==
Barber qualified for the knock-out stage of the first Yorkshire Evening News Tournament in 1923. He lost to Walter Hagen in the first round. The match went to the 21st hole, at which point Barber stymied Hagen. Hagen, however, holed his chip over Barber's ball to win the match. Barber reached the semi-final of the 1924 News of the World Matchplay at St George's Hill Golf Club, losing to George Gadd by 1 hole. He was runner-up in the 1931 Yorkshire Evening News Tournament at Sand Moor Golf Club, losing in the final to Ernest Whitcombe at the 39th hole.

== Death ==
Barber died on 31 December 1936 in Knokke-Heist, Belgium after an operation. He had been the professional at Royal Zoute Golf Club since July 1935.

== Tournament wins ==
- 1927 Midland Professional Championship
- 1932 Midland Professional Championship

== Results in major championships ==
Tournament	1923	1924	1925	1926	1927	1928	1929	1930	1931	1932	1933
The Open Championship	T16	T55		T5		T37	T49	T9	CUT		CUT

Note: Barber only played in The Open Championship.

Top 10
Did not play

CUT = missed the half-way cut
"T" indicates a tie for a place

== Team appearances ==
- England–Ireland Professional Match (representing England): 1932 (winners), 1933 (winners)
