= Bill Branch =

English golfer (1911–1985)

Personal information
- Full name: William John Branch
- Nationality: England
- Born: 20 February 1911 Alsager, Cheshire, England
- Died: 25 February 1985 (aged 74) Heslington, Yorkshire, England

Career
- Sport: Golf
- Turned professional: 1928
- Professional wins: 5

Best results in major championships
- Masters Tournament: DNP
- PGA Championship: DNP
- U.S. Open: DNP
- The Open Championship: 9th: 1935

William John Branch (20 February 1911 – 25 February 1985) was an English professional golfer. He finished 9th in the 1935 Open Championship and won the Belgian Open 10 days later. His last major success was in the 1954 Gleneagles-Saxone Foursomes Tournament.

== Golf career ==
Branch's father, Jack was a golf professional. Jack had been at Woolacombe Bay Golf Club in Devon and Stafford Castle but was professional at Alsager Golf Club in 1911 when Branch was born. Jack moved to Henbury Golf Club near Bristol soon after Branch's birth and was professional there for 37 years until his death in 1949 aged 64. After leaving school Branch became an assistant to his father where he stayed until becoming an assistant at Leicestershire Golf Club in 1937. He left the Leicestershire club at the end of 1945 and was unattached for some time until joining Berkhamstead Golf Club in 1949 and then moving to Ganton Golf Club in 1951. He was professional at Scarborough South Cliff Golf Club in the 1960s eventually moving to Fulford Golf Club in 1971.

Branch won the 1954 Gleneagles-Saxone Foursomes Tournament, in partnership with Donald Cameron. He was runner-up in the 1950 Daily Telegraph Foursomes Tournament and joint runner-up in the 1953 Silver King Tournament.

== Tournament wins ==
- 1930 PGA Assistants' Championship
- 1932 West of England Professional Championship
- 1935 Belgian Open
- 1936 Dunlop-Midland Professional Championship
- 1954 Gleneagles-Saxone Foursomes Tournament (with Donald Cameron)

== Results in major championships ==
Tournament	1930	1931	1932	1933	1934	1935	1936	1937	1938	1939
The Open Championship	T39				CUT	9	T31	13	CUT	CUT

Tournament	1940	1941	1942	1943	1944	1945	1946	1947	1948	1949
The Open Championship	NT	NT	NT	NT	NT	NT	CUT			T14

Tournament	1950	1951	1952	1953	1954	1955	1956	1957	1958	1959
The Open Championship	T24		CUT		T35	T22	CUT			

Tournament	1960	1961
The Open Championship		T46

Note: Branch only played in The Open Championship.

Top 10
Did not play

NT = No tournament
CUT = missed the half-way cut
"T" indicates a tie for a place

== Team appearances ==
- England–Scotland Professional Match (representing England): 1936 (winners)
- Slazenger Trophy (representing Great Britain and Ireland): 1956 (winners)
