= Ralph Moffitt =

English golfer (1932–2003)

Personal information
- Full name: Ralph Lawson Moffitt
- Nationality: England
- Born: 18 September 1932 Ryton, Tyne and Wear, England
- Died: 18 October 2003 (aged 71) Great Yarmouth, Norfolk, England

Career
- Sport: Golf
- Status: Professional
- Professional wins: 2

Best results in major championships
- Masters Tournament: DNP
- PGA Championship: DNP
- U.S. Open: DNP
- The Open Championship: 11th: 1962

Ralph Lawson Moffitt (18 September 1932 – 18 October 2003) was an English professional golfer. He played in the 1961 Ryder Cup.

== Career ==
Moffitt was born in Ryton, Tyne and Wear in 1932.

Moffitt tied for first place in the 1960 Dunlop Tournament and was runner-up to Peter Thomson in the 1961 News of the World Matchplay. Moffitt finished 8th in the Ryder Cup points list to gain a place in the 1961 Ryder Cup team. He was only selected for one match, a singles against Mike Souchak which he lost 5&4.

Moffitt won the 1962 Royal Gold Tournament and was runner-up three straight years at the Dunlop Masters from 1962 to 1964.

Moffitt was an assistant professional at Coventry Golf Club before spending 24 years as the club professional at Hearsall Golf Club. In 1979 he moved to Gorleston Golf Club at Gorleston, Great Yarmouth and retired there in 1992. He died at his home in Great Yarmouth aged 71.

== Professional wins ==
This list may be incomplete.

- 1960 Dunlop Tournament (tie with Eric Brown)
- 1962 Royal Gold Tournament

== Results in major championships ==
Tournament	1955	1956	1957	1958	1959
The Open Championship	CUT	CUT	38	CUT	T41

Tournament	1960	1961	1962	1963	1964	1965	1966	1967	1968	1969
The Open Championship	T21	T25	11	CUT	T13	CUT				

Tournament	1970	1971
The Open Championship		CUT

Note: Moffitt only played in The Open Championship.

Did not play

CUT = missed the half-way cut (3rd round cut in 1971 Open Championship)
"T" indicates a tie for a place

== Team appearances ==
- Ryder Cup (representing Great Britain): 1961
