= Charlie Ward (golfer) =

English golfer

Personal information
- Full name: Charles Harold Ward
- Nationality: England
- Born: 16 September 1911 Birmingham, England
- Died: August 2001 (age 89) Devon, England

Career
- Sport: Golf
- Status: Professional
- Professional wins: 17

Best results in major championships
- Masters Tournament: DNP
- PGA Championship: DNP
- U.S. Open: DNP
- The Open Championship: 3rd/T3: 1948, 1951

Achievements and awards
- Harry Vardon Trophy: 1948, 1949

Charles Harold Ward (16 September 1911 – August 2001) was a prominent English golfer of the 1940s, winner of the British Order of Merit in both 1948 and 1949, and twice finishing third in The Open Championship, in 1948 and 1951. He would add his name, at some stage, to the roll of honour of almost every leading event in British professional golf, with the exception of the Open.

== Early life ==
Ward was born in Birmingham, England. Like many players his age, Ward's best years were denied to him by World War II, so it was fitting that he should win the first professional event played after VE Day, the Daily Mail Victory Tournament at St Andrews. After his victory he returned late to his posting at an RAF base and as a punishment, was confined to barracks.

== Professional career ==
Ward would win three events in 1948 (one of them in a tie), and gained more recognition for his 1949 season, his three wins that year including the rich Spalding and North British-Harrogate Tournaments and then the British Masters, also played that year at St. Andrews.

Further victories followed in 1950 (the Daily Mail Tournament at Walton Heath, which Ward won in a playoff against Bobby Locke and Australian Ossie Pickworth) and 1951 (the Dunlop Tournament and the Lotus Tournament) before Ward's final victory on the British circuit in 1956, the British PGA Championship at Maesdu.

Ward represented Great Britain on three occasions in the Ryder Cup, in 1947, 1949 and 1951, although he only enjoyed one victory in his six matches, losing twice to Sam Snead and once to Ben Hogan.

== Death ==
Ward died after a short illness in August 2001, a month short of his 90th birthday.

== Tournament wins ==
- 1934 Dunlop-Midland Professional Championship
- 1937 West of England Professional Championship
- 1945 Daily Mail Tournament
- 1947 Daily Telegraph Foursomes Tournament (with Ronnie White)
- 1948 Silver King Tournament (tie with Jimmy Adams), Yorkshire Evening News Tournament, R A Brand Tournament, Daily Telegraph Foursomes Tournament (with Gerald Micklem)
- 1949 Spalding Tournament, North British-Harrogate Tournament, Dunlop Masters
- 1950 Daily Mail Tournament
- 1951 Dunlop Tournament, International Professional Mixed Foursomes, Lotus Tournament
- 1956 PGA Close Championship
- 1965 PGA Seniors Championship

== Results in major championships ==
Tournament	1932	1933	1934	1935	1936	1937	1938	1939
The Open Championship	T17	T28	T13					T30

Tournament	1940	1941	1942	1943	1944	1945	1946	1947	1948	1949
The Open Championship	NT	NT	NT	NT	NT	NT	T4	T6	T3	T4

Tournament	1950	1951	1952	1953	1954	1955	1956	1957	1958	1959
The Open Championship	CUT	3	CUT	T17	CUT	CUT	T17	CUT	CUT	T35

Tournament	1960	1961	1962	1963	1964	1965
The Open Championship			CUT			CUT

Note: Ward only played in The Open Championship.

Top 10
Did not play

NT = No tournament
CUT = missed the half-way cut
"T" indicates a tie for a place

== Team appearances ==
- Ryder Cup (representing Great Britain): 1947, 1949, 1951
- England–Ireland Professional Match (representing England): 1932 (winners)
