= Jack Hargreaves (golfer) =

English golfer (1914–1993)

Personal information
- Full name: John Hargreaves
- Nationality: England
- Born: 1914 Fleetwood, Lancashire, England
- Died: 1993 (aged 79)

Career
- Sport: Golf
- Status: Professional
- Professional wins: 4

Best results in major championships
- Masters Tournament: DNP
- PGA Championship: DNP
- U.S. Open: DNP
- The Open Championship: T3: 1948

John Hargreaves (1914–1993) was an English professional golfer. He finished tied for 3rd in the 1948 Open Championship and was on the 1951 Ryder Cup team, although he did not play in any matches.

== Golf career ==
Hargreaves was assistant professional at Knott End before moving to nearby Fleetwood Golf Club. He first came to public notice when, representing Fleetwood, he reached the last 8 of the 1934 Daily Mirror Assistants' Tournament. He qualified for the 1937 Open Championship but missed the cut. Shortly after the Open he played well in the Daily Mirror Assistants' Tournament and, with rounds of 73 and 68, he led after the first day. Rounds of 74 and 78 on the second day left him in a tie for 5th place. He left Fleetwood in early 1938 to be playing assistant at Walmley Golf Club.

In the 1938 Daily Mirror Assistants' Tournament he again led after the first day. Rounds of 73 and 71 left him tied for the lead with Bill Laidlaw and four strokes ahead of the rest of the field. Rounds of 81 and 76 on the second day left him in 5th place, the same as in 1937. In 1939 Hargreaves reached the final of the Yorkshire Evening News Tournament at Temple Newsam. In the final, against Dai Rees, he lost at the 37th hole. Hargreaves was 3 up at lunch and was still 3 up after 28 holes. Rees won the next two holes but Hargreaves won the 33rd to go 2 up again. Rees won the 34th and then the last to halve the match. Rees then holed an 8-yard putt at the first extra hole to win the match. A few weeks later Hargreaves failed to qualify in the Open. Rounds of 79 and 78 meant he missed out by one stroke.

In 1947 Hargreaves became professional at nearby Sutton Coldfield where he stayed until retiring in 1979. He died in 1993.

== Tournament wins ==
- 1935 Northern Assistants' Championship
- 1951 Spalding Tournament
- 1953 Swallow-Harrogate Tournament, Goodwin (Sheffield) Foursomes Tournament (with Bernard Hunt),

== Results in major championships ==
Tournament	1937	1938	1939
The Open Championship	CUT		

Tournament	1940	1941	1942	1943	1944	1945	1946	1947	1948	1949
The Open Championship	NT	NT	NT	NT	NT	NT		CUT	T3	CUT

Tournament	1950	1951	1952	1953	1954	1955	1956	1957	1958	1959
The Open Championship	CUT	T19	T27	33	T20	CUT	T17	CUT		T41

Tournament	1960	1961	1962	1963	1964
The Open Championship			CUT	CUT	CUT

Note: Hargreaves only played in The Open Championship.

Top 10
Did not play

NT = No tournament
CUT = missed the half-way cut
"T" indicates a tie for a place

== Team appearances ==
- Ryder Cup (representing Great Britain): 1951
- PGA Cup (representing Great Britain and Ireland): 1977 (tie, non-playing captain)
