= 1963 Open Championship =

Coordinates: 53.7495°N 3.018°W

Tournament information
- Dates: 10–13 July 1963
- Location: Lytham St Annes, England
- Course: Royal Lytham & St Annes Golf Club

Statistics
- Par: 70
- Length: 6,757 yards (6,179 m)
- Field: 120 players, 47 after cut
- Cut: 149 (+9)
- Prize fund: £8,500 $23,800
- Winner's share: £1,500 $4,200

Champion
- (New Zealand) Bob Charles
- 277 (−3), playoff

Location in England
Location in Lancashire. England

The 1963 Open Championship was the 92nd Open Championship, held from 10 to 13 July at Royal Lytham & St Annes Golf Club in Lytham St Annes, England.

Bob Charles won his only major championship in a 36-hole playoff on Saturday, eight strokes ahead of runner-up Phil Rodgers, and became the first left-hander to win a major title. Masters winner Jack Nicklaus bogeyed the last two holes and came in third, one stroke out of the playoff. A heavy favourite among the local bettors, two-time defending champion Arnold Palmer tied for 26th. U.S. Open champion Julius Boros did not play.

This was the last 36-hole playoff at The Open, the format was changed to 18 holes the following year, used in 1970 and 1975. The four-hole aggregate format was introduced in 1986 and first used in 1989.

The PGA Championship was played the next week in Texas at Dallas, one of five times in the 1960s that these two majors were played in consecutive weeks in July. In epic heat, 23-year-old Nicklaus regrouped and won by two strokes for his third major title.

== Course layout ==
| Hole | 1 | 2 | 3 | 4 | 5 | 6 | 7 | 8 | 9 | Out | 10 | 11 | 12 | 13 | 14 | 15 | 16 | 17 | 18 | In | Total |
|---|---|---|---|---|---|---|---|---|---|---|---|---|---|---|---|---|---|---|---|---|---|
| Yards | 208 | 439 | 456 | 393 | 212 | 466 | 553 | 394 | 164 | 3,285 | 336 | 483 | 200 | 339 | 445 | 462 | 356 | 462 | 389 | 3,472 | 6,757 |

Previous lengths of the course for The Open Championship (since 1950):

- 1958: 6,635 yards (6,067 m)
- 1952: 6,657 yards (6,087 m)

== Field ==
For the first time, leading players were exempt from qualifying. 44 players who entered were exempted:

Peter Alliss, Brian Bamford, Michael Bonallack (a), Fred Boobyer, Ken Bousfield, Eric Brown, Peter Butler, Joe Carr (a), Billy Casper, Bob Charles, Neil Coles, Roger Foreman, Jean Garaïalde, Christy Greene, Tom Haliburton, Jimmy Hitchcock, Brian Huggett, Bernard Hunt, Denis Hutchinson, John Jacobs, Bobby Locke, Jimmy Martin, Cary Middlecoff, Sebastián Miguel, Ralph Moffitt, Kel Nagle, Jack Nicklaus, Christy O'Connor Snr, Arnold Palmer, John Panton, Lionel Platts, Gary Player, Dai Rees, Phil Rodgers, Sandy Saddler (a), Doug Sanders, Syd Scott, Doug Sewell, Dave Thomas, Peter Thomson, Harry Weetman, Ross Whitehead, Brian Wilkes, Guy Wolstenholme

Casper and Middlecoff subsequently withdrew leaving 42 pre-qualified players.

The exemption categories were:

1. The first 20 and those tying for 20th place in the 1962 Open
Peter Alliss, Bob Charles, Roger Foreman, Jean Garaïalde, Brian Huggett, Bernard Hunt, Denis Hutchinson, Jimmy Martin, Sebastian Miguel, Ralph Moffitt, Kel Nagle (3), Christy O'Connor Snr, Arnold Palmer (3,6), John Panton, Phil Rodgers, Syd Scott, Dave Thomas, Peter Thomson (3), Harry Weetman, Ross Whitehead

- Eligible but did not enter: Sam Snead

2. The first 30 and those tying for 30th place in the P.G.A. Order of Merit for 1962

3. The last 10 Open champions (1953–62)
Bobby Locke, Gary Player

- Eligible but did not enter: Ben Hogan

4. The last 5 Amateur champions (1958–62)
Michael Bonallack (5) (a), Joe Carr (a)

- Eligible but did not enter: Deane Beman (7), Richard Davies

5. Members of the 1962 British Eisenhower Cup team
Sandy Saddler (a)

- Eligible but did not enter: Martin Christmas, Ronnie Shade

6. The last 10 U.S. Open champions (1953–62)
Jack Nicklaus

- Eligible but did not enter: Tommy Bolt, Jack Fleck, Ed Furgol, Ben Hogan, Gene Littler, Dick Mayer
- Entered but later withdrew: Billy Casper, Cary Middlecoff

7. The last 5 U.S. Amateur champions (1958–62)

- Eligible but did not enter: Charles Coe, Labron Harris Jr.
- Jack Nicklaus had turned professional but was exempt under other categories

8. The first 30 money winners and those tying for 30th place in the U.S.P.G.A. official list for one year ending with the P.G.A. tournament immediately before the closing date of the U.S. Open entries

Exemptions for amateur champions were only granted if the player was still an amateur.

Qualifying

Qualification took place on 4–5 July (Thursday and Friday) at Fairhaven and St Annes Old Links. They were run as two separate events with 39 players to qualify from each venue to make a total field of 120. At each venue 34 players qualified on 147 and 6 players had a sudden-death playoff for the remaining five places. Max Faulkner, the 1951 Champion, was one of those who qualified in the playoff at Fairhaven. Bruce Devlin and Bill Large led the qualifying events. Three alternates were decided from each qualifying event.

Fairhaven – Grant Aitken, C.C. Bowman (a), Dick Burton, Colin Colenso, Gordon Cunningham, Stuart Davies, Bruce Devlin, Cherif El-Sayed Cherif, Max Faulkner, Tony Fisher, W.C.A. Hancock, Jack Hargreaves, Jimmy Henderson, J.R. Hood (a), Geoffrey Hunt, Jack Isaacs, Tony Jacklin, Arthur Lees, Eric Lester, Hugh Lewis, John MacDonald, G.R. Maisey, Bob Marshall, Frank Miller, A. Moore, Hedley Muscroft, George Parton, Frank Phillips, G.M. Rutherford (a), Denis Scanlan, David Snell, Bill Spence, Norman Sutton, Bobby Verwey, Bobby Walker, Gordon Weston, Trevor Wilkes, George Will, Michael Wolveridge
St Annes Old Links – Brian Allen, Herman Barron, David Beard, M. Birkett, Hugh Boyle, Harry Bradshaw, Alan Brookes, Fred Bullock, Alex Caygill, Barry Davies, Norman Drew, J.H. Ellis, C. Findlay, Simon Fogarty, Allan Gillies, Walter Godfrey, Tony Grubb, Harold Henning, Bryon Hutchinson, Norman Johnson, Alex King, Bill Large, Eddie Large, Malcolm Leeder, Nicky Lynch, Ian MacDonald, N.R. MacDonald, Jim McAlister, David Miller, Maurice Moir, D.G. Neech (a), Cyril Pennington, Sewsunker Sewgolum, Jack Sharkey, Ian Smith, Ramón Sota, Brian Stockdale (a), Donald Swaelens, Jack Wilkshire

== Prize money ==
The total prize money remained unchanged at £8,500 but the distribution was changed. The winner's prize was increased to £1,500 with £1,000 for second, £800 for third, £650 for fourth, £500 for fifth, £350 for sixth, £275 for seventh, £225 for eighth, £175 for ninth, £150 for tenth, £140 for 11th, £135 for 12th, £130 for 13th, £125 for 14th, £120 for 15th, £110 for 16th reducing at £5 intervals to £65 for 25th. The 26th to 30th places each received £60 with £55 for 31st to 35th, £50 for 36th to 40th and £45 for 41st to 45th. If more than 45 players made the cut the 41st to 45th prize money was distributed between all those finishing 41st or lower. If less than 45 made the cut the remaining prize money was not distributed. The winner of each qualifying event won £75 with £50 for second and £25 for third place.

== Round summaries ==
=== First round ===
Wednesday, 10 July 1963

| Place | Player | Score | To par |
|---|---|---|---|
| T1 | (United States) Phil Rodgers | 67 | −3 |
| T1 | (Australia) Peter Thomson | 67 | −3 |
| T3 | (New Zealand) Bob Charles | 68 | −2 |
| T3 | (Scotland) Tom Haliburton | 68 | −2 |
| T5 | (Australia) Kel Nagle | 69 | −1 |
| T5 | (Spain) Ramón Sota | 69 | −1 |
| T7 | (Australia) Frank Phillips | 70 | E |
| T7 | (Belgium) Donald Swaelens | 70 | E |
| T7 | (South Africa) Brian Wilkes | 70 | E |
| T10 | (England) Geoffrey Hunt | 71 | +1 |
| T10 | (England) Alex King | 71 | +1 |
| T10 | (England) Hugh Lewis | 71 | +1 |
| T10 | (Scotland) Ian MacDonald | 71 | +1 |
| T10 | (United States) Jack Nicklaus | 71 | +1 |
| T10 | (South Africa) Sewsunker Sewgolum | 71 | +1 |

Small:

=== Second round ===
Thursday, 11 July 1963

The cut rule was changed this year to a minimum of 45 players; it was previously a maximum of 50. The cut was 149 (+9) and 47 players advanced, but no amateurs.

| Place | Player | Score | To par |
|---|---|---|---|
| 1 | (United States) Phil Rodgers | 67-68=135 | −5 |
| 2 | (Australia) Peter Thomson | 67-69=136 | −4 |
| 3 | (United States) Jack Nicklaus | 71-67=138 | −2 |
| 4 | (Australia) Kel Nagle | 69-70=139 | −1 |
| 5 | (New Zealand) Bob Charles | 68-72=140 | E |
| T6 | (France) Jean Garaïalde | 72-69=141 | +1 |
| T6 | (Scotland) Tom Haliburton | 68-73=141 | +1 |
| T8 | (Scotland) Ian MacDonald | 71-71=142 | +2 |
| T8 | (Spain) Sebastián Miguel | 73-69=142 | +2 |
| T8 | (Republic of Ireland) Christy O'Connor Snr | 74-68=142 | +2 |
| T8 | (Spain) Ramón Sota | 69-73=142 | +2 |

Amateurs: Hood (+12), Saddler (+12), Carr (+15), Neech (+16), Rutherford (+16), Bonallack (+19), Bowman (+19), Stockdale (+20)

=== Third round ===
Friday, 12 July 1963 – (morning)

| Place | Player | Score | To par |
|---|---|---|---|
| 1 | (New Zealand) Bob Charles | 68-72-66=206 | −4 |
| 2 | (Australia) Peter Thomson | 67-69-71=207 | −3 |
| T3 | (United States) Jack Nicklaus | 71-67-70=208 | −2 |
| T3 | (United States) Phil Rodgers | 67-68-73=208 | −2 |
| 5 | (Australia) Kel Nagle | 69-70-73=212 | +2 |
| 6 | (France) Jean Garaïalde | 72-69-72=213 | +3 |
| T7 | (South Africa) Harold Henning | 76-68-71=215 | +5 |
| T7 | (Spain) Sebastián Miguel | 73-69-73=215 | +5 |
| T7 | (Spain) Ramón Sota | 69-73-73=215 | +5 |
| T10 | (England) Bernard Hunt | 72-71-73=216 | +6 |
| T10 | (Scotland) Ian MacDonald | 71-71-74=216 | +6 |

=== Final round ===
Friday, 12 July 1963 – (afternoon)

| Place | Player | Score | To par | Money (£) |
|---|---|---|---|---|
| T1 | (New Zealand) Bob Charles | 68-72-66-71=277 | −3 | Playoff |
| T1 | (United States) Phil Rodgers | 67-68-73-69=277 | −3 | Playoff |
| 3 | (United States) Jack Nicklaus | 71-67-70-70=278 | −2 | 800 |
| 4 | (Australia) Kel Nagle | 69-70-73-71=283 | +3 | 650 |
| 5 | (Australia) Peter Thomson | 67-69-71-78=285 | +5 | 500 |
| 6 | (Republic of Ireland) Christy O'Connor Snr | 74-68-76-68=286 | +6 | 350 |
| T7 | (South Africa) Gary Player | 75-70-72-70=287 | +7 | 250 |
| T7 | (Spain) Ramón Sota | 69-73-73-72=287 | +7 | 250 |
| T9 | (France) Jean Garaïalde | 72-69-72-75=288 | +8 | 163 |
| T9 | (Spain) Sebastián Miguel | 73-69-73-73=288 | +8 | 163 |

=== Playoff ===
Saturday, 13 July 1963

Charles won the 36-hole playoff by eight strokes; he led by three after the first round.

| Place | Player | Score | To par | Money (£) |
|---|---|---|---|---|
| 1 | (New Zealand) Bob Charles | 69-71=140 | E | 1,500 |
| 2 | (United States) Phil Rodgers | 72-76=148 | +8 | 1,000 |

==== Scorecards ====
Morning round

| Hole | 1 | 2 | 3 | 4 | 5 | 6 | 7 | 8 | 9 | 10 | 11 | 12 | 13 | 14 | 15 | 16 | 17 | 18 |
|---|---|---|---|---|---|---|---|---|---|---|---|---|---|---|---|---|---|---|
| Par | 3 | 4 | 4 | 4 | 3 | 4 | 5 | 4 | 3 | 4 | 5 | 3 | 4 | 4 | 4 | 4 | 4 | 4 |
| (New Zealand) Charles | E | +1 | +1 | E | E | E | −1 | −1 | −1 | −1 | −2 | −1 | −2 | −2 | −2 | −3 | −1 | −1 |
| (United States) Rodgers | E | +1 | +2 | +2 | +2 | +2 | +2 | +1 | +1 | +1 | +1 | +1 | +1 | +1 | +1 | +1 | +2 | +2 |

Afternoon round

| Hole | 1 | 2 | 3 | 4 | 5 | 6 | 7 | 8 | 9 | 10 | 11 | 12 | 13 | 14 | 15 | 16 | 17 | 18 |
|---|---|---|---|---|---|---|---|---|---|---|---|---|---|---|---|---|---|---|
| Par | 3 | 4 | 4 | 4 | 3 | 4 | 5 | 4 | 3 | 4 | 5 | 3 | 4 | 4 | 4 | 4 | 4 | 4 |
| (New Zealand) Charles | −1 | −1 | +1 | E | +1 | +1 | +1 | E | E | −1 | −1 | −1 | −1 | −1 | E | E | E | E |
| (United States) Rodgers | +3 | +4 | +4 | +3 | +3 | +2 | +3 | +2 | +3 | +3 | +4 | +5 | +6 | +7 | +7 | +7 | +7 | +8 |

Cumulative playoff scores, relative to par

| Birdie | Bogey | Double bogey |
