= 1967 Ryder Cup =

Golf tournament in the United States

17th Ryder Cup Matches
- Dates: October 20–22, 1967
- Venue: Champions Golf Club
- Location: Houston, Texas, U.S.
- Captains: Ben Hogan (USA); Dai Rees (Great Britain)
(United States)	23 1/2	8 1/2	(United Kingdom)
- United States wins the Ryder Cup

Location map
- Location within Texas

The 17th Ryder Cup Matches were held October 20–22, 1967 at the Champions Golf Club in Houston, Texas. The United States team won the competition by a record score of 23 1/2 to 8 1/2 points. To date, the 15-point victory margin remains the largest at the Ryder Cup.

Ben Hogan was named the captain of the U.S. team in May 1967, five months before the matches. He opted for the U.S. team to use the smaller British golf ball; the same weight, its diameter was .06 inches (1.5 mm) smaller at 1.62 inches (4.11 cm).

The match had originally been arranged for June 9–11, a date that the British P.G.A. had reluctantly agreed to, as it interfered with the British tournament season. In April 1966, it was agreed that the dates be changed to October 20–22.

The course hosted the U.S. Open two years later in 1969.

== Format ==
The Ryder Cup is a match play event, with each match worth one point. From 1963 through 1971 the competition format was as follows:

- Day 1 — Eight foursomes (alternate shot) matches, four each in morning and afternoon sessions
- Day 2 — Eight four-ball (better ball) matches, four each in morning and afternoon sessions
- Day 3 — Sixteen singles matches, eight each in morning and afternoon sessions

With a total of 32 points, 16 1/2 points were required to win the Cup. All matches were played to a maximum of 18 holes.

== Teams ==
Team USA
Name	Age	Points rank	Previous Ryder Cups	Matches	W–L–H	Winning percentage
Ben Hogan	55	Non-playing captain
Billy Casper	36	1	3	14	8–3–3	67.86
Arnold Palmer	38	2	3	16	11–4–1	71.88
Gay Brewer	35	3	0	Rookie
Doug Sanders	34	4	0	Rookie
Gene Littler	37	5	3	14	5–3–6	57.14
Julius Boros	47	6	3	11	7–2–2	72.73
Bobby Nichols	31	7	0	Rookie
Al Geiberger	30	8	0	Rookie
Gardner Dickinson	40	9	0	Rookie
Johnny Pott	31	10	2	3	1–2–0	33.33

The British team was based on a points system using performances in 1966 and 1967, starting with the 1966 Schweppes PGA Close Championship and finishing after the 1967 Open Championship.

Team Great Britain
Name	Age	Points rank	Previous Ryder Cups	Matches	W–L–H	Winning percentage
(Wales) Dai Rees	54	Non-playing captain
(England) Peter Alliss	36	1	6	21	9–8–4	52.38
(Republic of Ireland) Hugh Boyle	31	9	0	Rookie
(England) Neil Coles	33	3	3	16	5–8–3	40.62
(England) Malcolm Gregson	24	8	0	Rookie
(Wales) Brian Huggett	30	7	1	5	2–2–1	50.00
(England) Bernard Hunt	37	4	6	21	6–12–3	35.71
(England) Tony Jacklin	23	5	0	Rookie
(Republic of Ireland) Christy O'Connor Snr	42	6	6	19	7–11–1	39.47
(Wales) Dave Thomas	33	2	3	13	1–9–3	19.23
(Scotland) George Will	30	10	2	10	2–7–1	25.00

== Friday matches ==
October 20, 1967

=== Morning foursomes ===
	Results
Huggett/Will	halved	Casper/Boros
Alliss/O'Connor	(United States) 2 & 1	Palmer/Dickinson
Jacklin/Thomas	(United Kingdom) 4 & 3	Sanders/Brewer
Hunt/Coles	(United States) 6 & 5	Nichols/Pott
1 1/2	Session	2 1/2
1 1/2	Overall	2 1/2

=== Afternoon foursomes ===
	Results
Huggett/Will	(United States) 1 up	Casper/Boros
Gregson/Boyle	(United States) 5 & 4	Dickinson/Palmer
Jacklin/Thomas	(United Kingdom) 3 & 2	Littler/Geiberger
Alliss/O'Connor	(United States) 2 & 1	Nichols/Pott
1	Session	3
2 1/2	Overall	5 1/2

== Saturday matches ==
October 21, 1967

=== Morning four-ball ===
	Results
Alliss/O'Connor	(United States) 3 & 2	Casper/Brewer
Hunt/Coles	(United States) 1 up	Nichols/Pott
Jacklin/Thomas	(United States) 1 up	Littler/Geiberger
Huggett/Will	(United States) 3 & 2	Dickinson/Sanders
0	Session	4
2 1/2	Overall	9 1/2

=== Afternoon four-ball ===
	Results
Hunt/Coles	(United States) 5 & 3	Casper/Brewer
Alliss/Gregson	(United States) 3 & 2	Dickinson/Sanders
Will/Boyle	(United States) 1 up	Palmer/Boros
Jacklin/Thomas	halved	Littler/Geiberger
1/2	Session	3 1/2
3	Overall	13

== Sunday matches ==
October 22, 1967

=== Morning singles ===
	Results
Hugh Boyle	(United States) 4 & 3	Gay Brewer
Peter Alliss	(United States) 2 & 1	Billy Casper
Tony Jacklin	(United States) 3 & 2	Arnold Palmer
Brian Huggett	(United Kingdom) 1 up	Julius Boros
Neil Coles	(United Kingdom) 2 & 1	Doug Sanders
Malcolm Gregson	(United States) 4 & 2	Al Geiberger
Dave Thomas	halved	Gene Littler
Bernard Hunt	halved	Bobby Nichols
3	Session	5
6	Overall	18

=== Afternoon singles ===
	Results
Brian Huggett	(United States) 5 & 3	Arnold Palmer
Peter Alliss	(United Kingdom) 2 & 1	Gay Brewer
Tony Jacklin	(United States) 3 & 2	Gardner Dickinson
Christy O'Connor	(United States) 3 & 2	Bobby Nichols
George Will	(United States) 3 & 1	Johnny Pott
Malcolm Gregson	(United States) 2 & 1	Al Geiberger
Bernard Hunt	halved	Julius Boros
Neil Coles	(United Kingdom) 2 & 1	Doug Sanders
2 1/2	Session	5 1/2
8 1/2	Overall	23 1/2

== Individual player records ==
Each entry refers to the win–loss–half record of the player.

=== United States ===
Player	Points	Overall	Singles	Foursomes	Fourballs
Julius Boros	3	2–1–2	0–1–1	1–0–1	1–0–0
Gay Brewer	3	3–2–0	1–1–0	0–1–0	2–0–0
Billy Casper	4.5	4–0–1	1–0–0	1–0–1	2–0–0
Gardner Dickinson	5	5–0–0	1–0–0	2–0–0	2–0–0
Al Geiberger	3.5	3–1–1	2–0–0	0–1–0	1–0–1
Gene Littler	2	1–1–2	0–0–1	0–1–0	1–0–1
Bobby Nichols	4.5	4–0–1	1–0–1	2–0–0	1–0–0
Arnold Palmer	5	5–0–0	2–0–0	2–0–0	1–0–0
Johnny Pott	4	4–0–0	1–0–0	2–0–0	1–0–0
Doug Sanders	2	2–3–0	0–2–0	0–1–0	2–0–0

=== Great Britain ===
Player	Points	Overall	Singles	Foursomes	Fourballs
Peter Alliss	1	1–5–0	1–1–0	0–2–0	0–2–0
Hugh Boyle	0	0–3–0	0–1–0	0–1–0	0–1–0
Neil Coles	2	2–3–0	2–0–0	0–1–0	0–2–0
Malcolm Gregson	0	0–4–0	0–2–0	0–1–0	0–1–0
Brian Huggett	1.5	1–3–1	1–1–0	0–1–1	0–1–0
Bernard Hunt	1	0–3–2	0–0–2	0–1–0	0–2–0
Tony Jacklin	2.5	2–3–1	0–2–0	2–0–0	0–1–1
Christy O'Connor	0	0–4–0	0–1–0	0–2–0	0–1–0
Dave Thomas	3	2–1–2	0–0–1	2–0–0	0–1–1
George Will	0.5	0–4–1	0–1–0	0–1–1	0–2–0

== Nicklaus absence ==
Despite having won his seventh major title as a professional at the U.S. Open in June, 27-year-old Jack Nicklaus was not a member of the U.S. team. At the time, a five-year apprenticeship as a professional was required before Ryder Cup points could be earned. Nicklaus turned pro in November 1961 and was granted tournament status at the end of that year. He expedited his status by passing PGA business classes in February 1966, and was granted full membership that June. Only then was he eligible to accumulate Ryder Cup points, which ended with the Masters in April. Captain's selections did not exist in 1967 and Nicklaus was in a slump following his win at the Masters in 1966; entering the Masters in 1967 as the two-time defending champion, he was in 13th place in the U.S. Ryder Cup standings. Also just off the team were Dave Marr and Bob Goalby. Nicklaus and Goalby missed the cut at Augusta and Marr's T-16 finish was not enough to pass Johnny Pott for the tenth and final spot on the team. Pott was 4–0–0 in the competition.

The outmoded five-year rule had similarly kept Arnold Palmer off the teams in 1957 and 1959. Don January won the PGA Championship in 1967 in July, but was also at home; the only reigning major champion on either team in 1967 was Masters champion Gay Brewer.

Nicklaus competed in the Ryder Cup as a player from 1969 through 1981, missing only in 1979. He was the non-playing captain in 1983 and 1987.
