= Peter Gill (golfer) =

English professional golfer (1930–2020)

Personal information
- Full name: Peter E. Gill
- Nationality: England
- Born: 23 July 1930 Aldridge, Walsall, England
- Died: 23 April 2020 (aged 89) Maidstone, Kent, England

Career
- Sport: Golf
- Status: Professional
- Former tours: European Tour; European Seniors Tour
- Professional wins: 2

Best results in major championships
- Masters Tournament: DNP
- PGA Championship: DNP
- U.S. Open: DNP
- The Open Championship: CUT: 1953, 1955, 1956, 1957, 1958, 1959, 1967

Peter E. Gill (23 July 1930 – 23 April 2020) was an English professional golfer. In 1959 he won the Coombe Hill Assistants' Tournament and the Gor-Ray Cup in successive weeks. He died in 2020 from COVID-19 as a result of the COVID-19 pandemic in England.

== Professional career ==
Gill was an assistant professional in the 1950s, first at Little Aston Golf Club and then at Addington Golf Club. He played regularly in assistants' tournaments and in 1953, while still at Little Aston, he reached the semi-final of the Gor-Ray Cup, the PGA Assistants' Championship, before losing to Geoffrey Hunt. He qualified for the Open Championship the same year. In 1959 he won the Coombe Hill Assistants' Tournament and the Gor-Ray Cup in successive weeks. He won the Coombe Hill Tournament after a six-hole playoff with Billy Bingham and then won the Gor-Ray Cup, a stroke ahead of Peter Shanks.

Gill was third in the 1970 John Player Classic, an event that had first prize of £25,000. Christy O'Connor Snr won the event, ahead of Tony Jacklin, with Gill tying with Neil Coles and winning £3,750. Although he over 40 when the tour was formed, Gill played in a few European Tour events in 1972 and 1973.

Gill played in the PGA Seniors Championship in the 1980s. In his first appearance in 1981 he finished a stroke behind Christy O'Connor Snr and Fred Boobyer. The following year he was again a shot out of a playoff. In 1983 he was runner-up, nine strokes behind O'Connor who won the event for the sixth time and for third successive year. Gill played in the European Seniors Tour in its early years, although he was over 60 when the tour was founded. He had one top-10 finish, in the 1992 Belfast Telegraph Irish Senior Masters.

Gill was the professional at Surbiton Golf Club in Surrey, Gatton Manor in Surrey and Knole Park in Kent. He was an honorary member of the PGA.

== Professional wins (2) ==
- 1959 Coombe Hill Assistants' Tournament, Gor-Ray Cup

== Results in major championships ==
Tournament	1953	1954	1955	1956	1957	1958	1959	1960	1961	1962	1963	1964	1965	1966	1967
The Open Championship	CUT		CUT	CUT	CUT	CUT	CUT		WD						CUT

Note: Gill only played in The Open Championship.

Did not play

CUT = missed the half-way cut
WD = withdrew
