= Daks Tournament =

Tournament information
- Location: England
- Established: 1950
- Final year: 1971

Final champion
- (England) Neil Coles and (Wales) Brian Huggett

The Daks Tournament was an important professional golf tournament held in England from 1950 to 1971 and was generally held in early June. 17 of the 22 events were held at the Wentworth Club. Neil Coles enjoyed considerable success in the event winning the tournament four times and being a runner-up on four occasions. The tournament was sponsored by DAKS.

== Winners ==
Year	Winner	Country	Venue	Score	Margin of victory	Runner(s)-up	Winner's share (£)	Ref
1950	Norman Sutton	England	Royal Mid-Surrey Golf Club	272	3 strokes	(Belgium) Flory Van Donck	400	
1951	John Panton	Scotland	Sunningdale Golf Club	282	3 strokes	(South Africa) Bobby Locke	400	
1952	Fred Daly	Northern Ireland	Wentworth Club	280	2 strokes	(England) Jack Hargreaves	400	
1953	Dai Rees	Wales	Wentworth Club	280	1 stroke	(Scotland) Tom Haliburton (Belgium) Flory Van Donck	400	
1954	Peter Alliss	England	Little Aston Golf Club	279	1 stroke	(South Africa) Bobby Locke	400	
1955	John Pritchett	England	Sunningdale Golf Club	275	2 strokes	(Wales) Dai Rees	600	
1956	Trevor Wilkes	South Africa	Wentworth Club	276	9 strokes	(Scotland) Eric Brown (Scotland) Tom Haliburton (England) Peter Mills	600	
1957	Bobby Locke	South Africa	Wentworth Club	281	3 strokes	(Scotland) Eric Brown (England) Bernard Hunt	600	
1958	Harold Henning; Peter Thomson	South Africa; Australia	Wentworth Club	275	Tie	Shared title	Shared 1000 and 400	
1959	Christy O'Connor Snr	Ireland	Wentworth Club	274	3 strokes	(England) Peter Mills	1000	
1960	Peter Thomson	Australia	Wentworth Club	279	2 strokes	(Scotland) Tom Haliburton (England) Jimmy Hitchcock	1000	
1961	Bernard Hunt	England	Wentworth Club	279	1 stroke	(England) Neil Coles	1000	
1962	Bob Charles; Dai Rees	New Zealand; Wales	Wentworth Club	278	Tie	Shared title	Shared 1000 and 500	
1963	Peter Alliss; Neil Coles	England; England	Wentworth Club	280	Tie	Shared title	Shared 1000 and 500	
1964	Neil Coles	England	Wentworth Club	282	1 stroke	(Australia) Peter Thomson	1000	
1965	Peter Thomson	Australia	Wentworth Club	275	4 strokes	(England) Guy Wolstenholme	1000	
1966	Hugh Boyle	Ireland	Wentworth Club	286	1 stroke	(England) Neil Coles (Wales) Dai Rees (Wales) Dave Thomas	1000	
1967	Malcolm Gregson	England	Wentworth Club	279	2 strokes	(England) Neil Coles	1000	
1968	Malcolm Gregson	England	Wentworth Club	284	1 stroke	(England) Neil Coles	1000	
1969	Brian Huggett	Wales	Wentworth Club	289	2 strokes	(Scotland) Bernard Gallacher	1000	
1970	Neil Coles	England	Wentworth Club	281	3 strokes	(England) Peter Wilcock	1000	
1971	Neil Coles; Brian Huggett	England; Wales	South Herts Golf Club	284	Tie	Shared title	Shared 1000 and 650	
