= Bowmaker Tournament =

Tournament information
- Location: Sunningdale, Berkshire, England
- Established: 1957
- Course: Sunningdale Golf Club
- Month played: June/July
- Final year: 1971

Final champion
- Peter Oosterhuis

Location in England

The Bowmaker Tournament was an invitation pro-am golf tournament played from 1957 to 1970. Except in the first and final years the tournament was held at Sunningdale Golf Club. The main competition was a 36-hole stroke play event for the professionals played over two days. There was also a professional/amateur team competition. For the inaugural event, the professional's score and the better ball score of their two amateur partners (one low handicap and one celebrity) counted for the team. In subsequent years, it was a simple better ball event, with each professional having one amateur partner.

The Bowmaker Tournament was founded by finance company Bowmaker Ltd.. Bowmaker ended its sponsorship in 1970, but the tournament continued with a new sponsor as the Sunbeam Electric Tournament, retaining the same format and place on the calendar – the week before The Open Championship. The Sunbeam Electric sponsorship lasted for just one year and the tournament ended after the 1971 event; in 1972 and 1973 the company sponsored the Sunbeam Electric Scottish Open.

In the 1965 tournament Kel Nagle started his final round with an albatross two at the 492-yard first hole.

== Winners ==
| Year | Winner | Country | Venue | Score | Margin of victory | Runner(s)-up | Winner's share (£) | Ref |
Bowmaker Tournament
| 1957 | Frank Jowle; Bobby Locke | England; South Africa | Berkshire Golf Club | 135 | Tie | Shared title | Shared 500 and 300 | |
| 1958 | Bernard Hunt; Peter Mills | England; England | Sunningdale Golf Club | 129 | Tie | Shared title | Shared 350 and 250 | |
| 1959 | Bobby Locke | South Africa | Sunningdale Golf Club | 132 | 1 stroke | (Spain) Ángel Miguel | 350 | |
| 1960 | Peter Thomson | Australia | Sunningdale Golf Club | 132 | 1 stroke | (England) Bernard Hunt | 350 | |
| 1961 | Bob Charles | New Zealand | Sunningdale Golf Club | 132 | 2 strokes | (South Africa) Denis Hutchinson (Australia) Kel Nagle | 350 | |
| 1962 | Kel Nagle | Australia | Sunningdale Golf Club | 133 | 1 stroke | (Wales) Dai Rees | 350 | |
| 1963 | Peter Butler | England | Sunningdale Golf Club | 132 | 2 strokes | (England) Ken Bousfield (Wales) Brian Huggett (Australia) Kel Nagle | 350 | |
| 1964 | Neil Coles | England | Sunningdale Golf Club | 136 | 1 stroke | (England) Peter Alliss | 350 | |
| 1965 | Kel Nagle | Australia | Sunningdale Golf Club | 133 | 2 strokes | (New Zealand) Bob Charles (England) Hedley Muscroft (Scotland) George Will | 350 | |
| 1966 | Fred Boobyer | England | Sunningdale Golf Club | 135 | 1 stroke | (England) Hedley Muscroft | 350 | |
| 1967 | Peter Butler | England | Sunningdale Golf Club | 131 | 1 stroke | (Australia) Peter Thomson | 350 | |
| 1968 | Clive Clark | England | Sunningdale Golf Club | 136 | 2 strokes | (Scotland) George Will | 350 | |
| 1969 | Tony Grubb; Brian Huggett | England; Wales | Sunningdale Golf Club | 135 | Tie | Shared title | Shared 600 and 400 | |
| 1970 | Neil Coles | England | Royal Mid-Surrey Golf Club | 132 | 3 strokes | (England) Jimmy Hitchcock | 600 | |
Sunbeam Electric Tournament
| 1971 | Peter Oosterhuis | England | Royal Mid-Surrey Golf Club | 132 | 4 strokes | (Australia) Peter Thomson | 600 | |
