= Geoffrey Hunt =

English golfer

Geoff Hunt
Personal information
- Full name: Geoffrey Michael Hunt
- Nationality: England
- Born: c. 1936 Atherstone, Warwickshire, England

Career
- Sport: Golf
- Status: Professional
- Professional wins: 4

Best results in major championships
- Masters Tournament: CUT: 1964, 1965
- PGA Championship: DNP
- U.S. Open: DNP
- The Open Championship: T23: 1959

Geoffrey Michael Hunt (born c. 1936) is an English professional golfer, the younger brother of Bernard Hunt. Hunt is best remembered for playing in the 1963 Ryder Cup with his brother Bernard, the first brothers to play in the same Ryder Cup team since the Whitcombe brothers in 1935.

== Career ==
Hunt was the son of Jack Hunt, the professional at Atherstone Golf Club and, like his brother Bernard, became as assistant to his father. In 1953, he was beaten 2&1 by Bernard in the 36-hole final of the Gor-Ray Cup at Hartsbourne Golf Club, the assistant professionals' championship. Following this final, John was invited to become the professional at Hartsbourne and the two brothers became assistants there. Hunt first came to prominence as a 17-year-old in the 1953 Open Championship. Rounds of 74 and 74 put him a good position after two days although he faded on the final day with rounds of 79 and 86. The following year he won the Gor-Ray Cup, which had become a stroke-play event, by two strokes from Peter Mills.

After his win in the 1954 Gor-Ray Cup, Hunt had a long illness only returning to tournament golf at the start of the 1957 season. He was a runner-up in the 1958 Coombe Hill Assistants' Tournament behind Ross Whitehead. In 1960 the Hunt brothers won the Pickering Professional-Assistants tournament at Wentworth, a 36-hole four-ball aggregate pairs event. They won by 3 strokes with a score of 286. Hunt won the 1962 Coombe Hill Assistants' Tournament with a record score of 274, 6 strokes ahead of Len Roberts. Hunt had been ineligible for the Gor-Ray Cup for some years, under a rule which excluded assistants who had had high finishes in big events. However the 1963 event saw some rule changes, which enabled him to play, as well as an increase in prize money. George Will seemed the likely winner until Hunt holed out from 180 yards at the 17th hole of the final round, for an eagle 2, to force a playoff. The 36-hole playoff was not played until nearly two weeks later, Will winning by six strokes, 136 to Hunt's 142.

The British team for the 1963 Ryder Cup was determined using a points system, points being earned in 9 stroke-play events during the 1963 season, starting with the Schweppes PGA Close Championship in early April. Winners of the 1963 Open Championship and News of the World Match Play received automatic places. Dave Thomas won the News of the World Match Play but, since he finished 9th in the points list, the team was filled with the leading 10 players in the points list. Hunt was in 10th place before the final event, the Senior Service Tournament, in September. He finished in 8th place in the tournament and remained in 10th place in the points list, to gain a place in the team. With his brother Bernard also making the team, they became the first brothers to play in the same Ryder Cup team since the three Whitcombe brothers in 1935. Hunt played in three matches, losing them all. As a member of the Ryder Cup team he received invitations to play in the 1964 and 1965 Masters Tournament. He played in both years but missed the cut both times.

Hunt retired from tournament golf at the end of 1966 and in 1969 replaced his brother as the professional at Hartsbourne Golf Club.

== Tournament wins ==
- 1954 Gor-Ray Cup
- 1960 Pickering Professional-Assistants Tournament (with Bernard Hunt)
- 1962 Coombe Hill Assistants' Tournament
- 1977 Sunningdale Foursomes (with David Matthew)

== Results in major championships ==
Tournament	1953	1954	1955	1956	1957	1958	1959	1960	1961	1962	1963	1964	1965
Masters Tournament												CUT	CUT
The Open Championship	T45					CUT	T23	T28			T39	T30	CUT

Note: Hunt never played in the U.S. Open or PGA Championship.

Did not play

CUT = missed the half-way cut
"T" indicates a tie for a place

== Team appearances ==
- Ryder Cup (representing Great Britain): 1963
