= Peter Mills (golfer) =

English golfer (born 1931)

Personal information
- Full name: Ralph Peter Mills
- Nationality: England
- Born: 14 May 1931 (age 95) Windsor, Berkshire, England

Career
- Sport: Golf
- Status: Professional
- Professional wins: 4

Best results in major championships
- Masters Tournament: DNP
- PGA Championship: DNP
- U.S. Open: DNP
- The Open Championship: 20th: 1960

Ralph Peter Mills (born 14 May 1931) is an English former professional golfer. He played in the Ryder Cup in 1957 and 1959.

== Golf career ==
Mills was assistant at Fulwell Golf Club from 1948 and was tied for third place at his home course in the southern section qualifying for the 1949 Daily Mail Tournament, after a first round of 67. He was in the RAF doing his National Service from 1949 and 1951 which limited his playing opportunities. He did, however, reach the semi-finals of the Gor-Ray Assistants' match-play tournament in 1950 and in 1951 won the Coombe Hill Assistants' Tournament by 11 strokes. In late 1951, he moved to Wentworth as an assistant and was second to Bernard Hunt in the 1952 Coombe Hill Assistants' Tournament. He lost in the final of the same tournament in 1954 at the 19th hole, but in 1955 he continued his success at Coombe Hill winning the tournament for a second time. Mills never won the Gor-Ray Cup, the assistant professionals' championship, but was runner-up to Geoffrey Hunt in 1954.

Mills had moved to West Hill Golf Club in late 1954. The following year he won the Professional Short Course Championship in Torquay. He scored 202 for the 72 holes to win by two strokes and take the first prize of £100. In 1956 he was joint-second, a distant 9 shots behind the winner, in the Daks Tournament at Wentworth, and he reached the semi-finals of the News of the World Match Play, losing 6&4 to Harry Weetman. Mills was joint winner of the 36-hole Bowmaker Tournament at Sunningdale in June 1958. He completed the front-9 of his second round in 28 (3-3-3-2-4-4-4-3-2) to equal the British tournament record. From October 1958 Mills became the professional at Pinner Hill Golf Club. In 1959 he was second on his own in the Daks Tournament, three strokes behind Christy O'Connor Snr.

Mills twice qualified for the British Ryder Cup team, in 1957 and 1959. In 1957 selection for the team of 10 was based on a points system over a two-year period ending after the 1957 Open Championship. Winners of the 1957 Open Championship and the 1957 News of the World Match Play were guaranteed places with the remaining places selected from the points list. Following the 1957 Open, Mills was 10th in the points list and did not qualify at that stage. Only when Christy O'Connor Snr, who had already qualified for the team, beat Tom Haliburton in the final of the News of the World Match Play, did Mills became the last member of the team. In the 1957 match, Mills was not selected for the foursomes but played Jack Burke Jr., the American captain, in the singles. Mills won 5 holes in a row from the 6th to the 10th to be 5 up, finished the morning round 5 ahead and eventually won the match 5&3. Selection for the 1959 team had changed, with seven members of the team chosen using a points system based on performances during the 1959 season, starting with the PGA Close Championship on 8 April and finishing with the Irish Hospitals Tournament on 12 July. Mills had a number of top-10 finishes and was fourth in the final list. Mills had a back injury while the team was in Washington and it was reported that he was to be replaced by John Panton. However, he recovered enough to remain in the team, although he was not chosen to play any matches.

In early 1961, Mills left his position as the professional at Pinner Hill to become a full-time tournament player. However the season was disappointing. After a loss of form caused by his back problems he attempted a return to tournament golf in 1964, but this also proved unsuccessful. He played a number of events in 1967 and 1968 with more success. He qualified for and made the cut in the Open Championship in both years. In October 1968, playing with Dave Thomas, he reached the quarter-finals of the Piccadilly Fourball Match Play.

Mills played in the Open Championship nine times between 1952 and 1968, making the cut five times with a best finish of 20th place in 1960.

== Personal life ==
Despite his efforts in the 1960s, Mills' back problems from 1959 led to the end of his competitive career. Later he became a wine merchant in Jersey.

== Professional wins (4) ==
- 1951 Coombe Hill Assistants' Tournament
- 1955 Coombe Hill Assistants' Tournament, Professional Short Course Championship
- 1958 Bowmaker Tournament (tied with Bernard Hunt)

== Results in major championships ==
Tournament	1952	1953	1954	1955	1956	1957	1958	1959	1960	1961	1962	1963	1964	1965	1966	1967	1968
The Open Championship	CUT	T38	T32			CUT	CUT	T23	20							T22	T42

Note: Mills only played in The Open Championship.

Did not play

CUT = missed the half-way cut
"T" indicates a tie for a place

== Team appearances ==
- Ryder Cup (representing Great Britain): 1957 (winners), 1959
- Joy Cup (representing the British Isles): 1956 (winners), 1958 (winners)
- Amateurs–Professionals Match (representing the Professionals): 1957 (winners), 1958, 1959 (winners), 1960 (winners)
