= Woodlawn International Invitational =

Men's professional golf tournament

Tournament information
- Location: Ramstein-Miesenbach, Germany
- Established: 1958
- Course(s): Woodlawn Golf Course
- Par: 70
- Format: Stroke play
- Month played: August
- Final year: 1968

Tournament record score
- Aggregate: 264 Bernard Hunt (1961)

Final champion
- (Australia) Frank Phillips

The Woodlawn International Invitational was a men's professional golf tournament held at Woodlawn Golf Course on the Ramstein Air Base, near Ramstein-Miesenbach in West Germany between 1958 and 1968. It was usually held the week following the German Open and, until its final year, had one of the highest prize funds in Continental Europe sponsored by the United States Air Force.

== Winners ==
Year	Winner	Country	Score	Margin of victory	Runner(s)-up	Country	Ref
1968	Frank Phillips	Australia	137	Playoff	Martin Roesink	Netherlands	
1967	Fred Boobyer	England	276	3 strokes	Barry Franklin; Tony Grubb	South Africa; England	
1966	Donald Swaelens	Belgium	278	Playoff	Jean Garaïalde	France	
1965	Tadashi Kitta	Japan	274	Playoff	Barry Franklin	South Africa	
1964	Denis Hutchinson	South Africa	272	2 strokes	Roberto De Vicenzo; Ángel Miguel	Argentina; Spain	
1963	Denis Hutchinson	South Africa	271	6 strokes	Retief Waltman	South Africa	
1962	Max Faulkner	England	273	Playoff	Bob Charles	New Zealand	
1961	Bernard Hunt	England	264	3 strokes	Eric Brown	Scotland	
1960	John Panton	Scotland	271	2 strokes	Bernard Hunt	England	
1959	John Panton	Scotland	267	4 strokes	Ken Bousfield; Flory Van Donck; Harry Weetman	England; Belgium; England	
1958	John Panton	Scotland	275	2 strokes	Bernard Hunt	England	
