= Boobyer =

Boobyer is a surname. Notable people with the surname include:

- Fred Boobyer (1928–2009), English golfer
- Neil Boobyer (born 1972), Welsh rugby union player
