= Lionel Platts =

English golfer (1934–2021)

Personal information
- Nationality: England
- Born: 10 October 1934 Sheffield, Yorkshire, England
- Died: 23 May 2021 (aged 86)
- Children: 3

Career
- Sport: Golf
- Status: Professional
- Former tours: European Tour; European Senior Tour
- Professional wins: 16

Best results in major championships
- Masters Tournament: CUT: 1966
- PGA Championship: DNP
- U.S. Open: DNP
- The Open Championship: T12: 1965

Lionel Platts (10 October 1934 – 23 May 2021) was an English professional golfer. He finished 7th in the PGA Order of Merit in both 1964 and 1965. He played in the 1965 Ryder Cup.

== Professional career ==
Platts was runner-up in the 1960 Coombe Hill Assistants' Tournament and he returned to win the event in 1961. Two weeks later he won the Gor-Ray Cup, the PGA Assistants' Championship, at Hartsbourne Country Club. Platts was 3 strokes behind leader Ross Whitehead after three rounds but had a last round 64 to win by 5 strokes from Whitehead, who was a further 6 strokes ahead of third-placed Alex Caygill. Platts, an assistant at Thorndon Park Golf Club near Brentwood, Essex, became the professional there later in 1961. In 1963 he won the Sunningdale Foursomes with David Snell.

Platts was runner-up in the Schweppes PGA Close Championship at Western Gailes Golf Club in 1964, two strokes behind Tony Grubb. The event was played in April and was the first important event of the season. The PGA experimented with using the bigger ball, as used in America. The following month he was again a runner-up, in the Martini International, six strokes behind Christy O'Connor Snr. Later in 1964 Platts won the Braemar seven-club tournament at Turnberry by a stroke from John Jacobs, winning £550. He played with a driver, 4, 6, 7 and 9 irons, a wedge and a putter. Platts finished the season 7th in the Order of Merit behind Peter Alliss, who won the Harry Vardon Trophy.

In May 1965 he lost in a sudden-death playoff to Ángel Miguel in the Swallow-Penfold Tournament. Later in the year he lost to Neil Coles at the 19th hole in the final of the News of the World Match Play. The following week he again came close to success in the Gallaher Ulster Open, losing to Bernard Hunt at the sixth hole of sudden-death playoff. Platts finished 7th in the Order of Merit for the second successive season, behind Bernard Hunt.

Selection for the 1965 Ryder Cup was based on a points system, starting with the 1964 Carroll Sweet Afton Tournament and finishing with the 1965 Esso Golden Tournament in late July. Platts finished 6th in the list to gain a place in the team. Platts played two fourball matches on the second day with Peter Butler, both against Billy Casper and Gene Littler, halving them both. He played in both singles sessions on the final day, losing to Julius Boros but beating Tommy Jacobs in the final match. Platts accepted an invitation to play in the 1966 Masters Tournament, scoring 80 and 79 and missing the cut.

Playing with Hedley Muscroft, Platts was runner-up in the inaugural Sumrie Better-Ball in 1969. Platts won the 1971 Portuguese Open, a stroke ahead of Antonio Garrido and Paul Herbert. In 1972 he won the Scottish Uniroyal Tournament, three strokes ahead of Peter Oosterhuis. The event had insufficient prize money to be part of the inaugural European Tour season.

Platts played in the Open Championship every year from 1961 to 1977. His best performance was when he was tied for 12th in 1965. He scored 68 in the first round of the 1967 Open Championship to lead the field, and eventually finished tied for 13th place. Platts made a hole-in-one during the second round of the 1971 Open Championship, on the 212-yard 4th hole at Royal Birkdale.

Platts was 57 when the European Senior Tour started in 1992 but he played a number of events, mostly between 1992 and 1994, making his final appearance in 2006.

== Personal life ==
Platts' son Chris had some success as a professional golfer. He won the 1988 Kenya Open on the Safari Circuit, the 1991 Open de Vittel on the Challenge Tour and the 1993 Perrier European Pro-Am, an unofficial money event on the Challenge Tour.

== Professional wins ==
- 1961 Coombe Hill Assistants' Tournament, Gor-Ray Cup
- 1962 Essex Open
- 1963 Sunningdale Foursomes (with David Snell), East Anglian Open, Essex Open
- 1964 Braemar Seven-club Tournament, Essex Open (tied with Geoff Gledhill)
- 1968 Yorkshire Professional Championship, Yorkshire Open, Wentworth Foursomes (with Bernard Cawthray)
- 1970 Graham Textiles Tournament, Northern Professional Championship
- 1971 Portuguese Open, Northern Professional Championship
- 1972 Scottish Uniroyal Tournament

== Results in major championships ==
| Tournament | 1961 | 1962 | 1963 | 1964 | 1965 | 1966 | 1967 | 1968 | 1969 |
|---|---|---|---|---|---|---|---|---|---|
| Masters Tournament | | | | | | CUT | | | |
| The Open Championship | T20 | T24 | T39 | CUT | T12 | T55 | T13 | CUT | CUT |

| Tournament | 1970 | 1971 | 1972 | 1973 | 1974 | 1975 | 1976 | 1977 |
|---|---|---|---|---|---|---|---|---|
| Masters Tournament | | | | | | | | |
| The Open Championship | CUT | T40 | CUT | CUT | CUT | CUT | CUT | CUT |

Note: Platts only played in the Masters Tournament and The Open Championship.

Did not play

CUT = missed the half-way cut (3rd round cut in 1968 and 1973 Open Championships)
"T" indicates a tie for a place

== Team appearances ==
- Ryder Cup (representing Great Britain): 1965
- Double Diamond International (representing England): 1972 (winners)
