= 1963 Ryder Cup =

Golf competition in Atlanta, Georgia

15th Ryder Cup Matches
- Dates: October 11–13, 1963
- Venue: Atlanta Athletic Club
- Location: Atlanta, Georgia
- Captains: Arnold Palmer (USA); John Fallon (Great Britain)
| (United States) | 23 | 9 | (United Kingdom) |
- United States wins the Ryder Cup

Location map
- Location within Georgia

The 15th Ryder Cup Matches were held October 11–13, 1963 at the Atlanta Athletic Club, at the site now known as East Lake Golf Club in Atlanta, Georgia. The United States team won the competition by a score of 23 to 9 points. The U.S. did not lose a single match in the afternoon sessions.

== Format ==
The Ryder Cup is a match play event, with each match worth one point. The competition format changed in 1963, with the addition of four-ball (better ball) matches on a third day of play. The schedule of play was as follows:

- Day 1 (Friday) — 8 foursomes (alternate shot) matches, 4 each in morning and afternoon sessions
- Day 2 (Saturday) — 8 four-ball (better ball) matches, 4 each in morning and afternoon sessions
- Day 3 (Sunday) — 16 singles matches, 8 each in morning and afternoon sessions

With a total of 32 points, 16 1/2 points were required to win the Cup. All matches were played to a maximum of 18 holes.

== Teams ==
In his second Ryder Cup, Arnold Palmer was the last playing captain in the competition. He was 3–1 in pairs and 1–1 in singles.

Despite having won his third major title as a professional at the PGA Championship in July, 23-year-old Jack Nicklaus was not a member of the U.S. team. Eligibility rules set by the PGA prevented him from participating in the Ryder Cup until 1969. He competed as a player through 1981, missing only the 1979 edition, and was the non-playing captain of the U.S. team in 1983 and 1987.

Team USA
| Name | Age | Previous Ryder Cups | Matches | W–L–H | Winning percentage |
| Arnold Palmer – captain | 34 | 1 | 4 | 3–0–1 | 87.50 |
| Julius Boros | 43 | 1 | 1 | 1–0–0 | 100.00 |
| Billy Casper | 32 | 1 | 3 | 3–0–0 | 100.00 |
| Dow Finsterwald | 34 | 3 | 7 | 5–2–0 | 71.43 |
| Bob Goalby | 34 | 0 | Rookie |
| Tony Lema | 29 | 0 | Rookie |
| Gene Littler | 33 | 1 | 3 | 0–1–2 | 33.33 |
| Billy Maxwell | 34 | 0 | Rookie |
| Johnny Pott | 27 | 0 | Rookie |
| Dave Ragan | 28 | 0 | Rookie |

The British team was determined using a points system, points being earned in 9 stroke-play events during the 1963 season. Winners of the 1963 Open Championship and News of the World Match Play received automatic places. The first qualifying event was the Schweppes PGA Close Championship in early April with the Senior Service Tournament in September being the final one. Dave Thomas won the News of the World Match Play but, since he finished 9th in the points list, the team was filled with the leading 10 players in the points list: Coles, Bernard Hunt, Huggett, Alliss, Haliburton, O'Connor, Weetman, Will, Thomas and Geoff Hunt.

Team Great Britain
| Name | Age | Previous Ryder Cups | Matches | W–L–H | Winning percentage |
| (Scotland) John Fallon | 50 | Non-playing captain |
| (England) Peter Alliss | 32 | 4 | 10 | 3–5–2 | 40.00 |
| (England) Neil Coles | 29 | 1 | 4 | 1–2–1 | 37.50 |
| (Scotland) Tom Haliburton | 48 | 1 | 3 | 0–3–0 | 0.00 |
| (Wales) Brian Huggett | 26 | 0 | Rookie |
| (England) Bernard Hunt | 33 | 4 | 9 | 2–6–1 | 27.78 |
| (England) Geoffrey Hunt | 27 | 0 | Rookie |
| (Republic of Ireland) Christy O'Connor Snr | 38 | 4 | 9 | 3–5–1 | 38.89 |
| (Wales) Dave Thomas | 29 | 1 | 2 | 0–1–1 | 25.00 |
| (England) Harry Weetman | 42 | 6 | 10 | 1–8–1 | 15.00 |
| (Scotland) George Will | 26 | 0 | Rookie |

== Friday's matches ==
=== Morning foursomes ===
| | Results |
|---|---|---|
| Huggett/Will | (United Kingdom) 3 & 2 | Palmer/Pott |
| Alliss/O'Connor | (United States) 1 up | Casper/Ragan |
| Coles/B. Hunt | halved | Boros/Lema |
| Thomas/Weetman | halved | Littler/Finsterwald |
| 2 | Session | 2 |
| 2 | Overall | 2 |

=== Afternoon foursomes ===
| | Results |
|---|---|---|
| Thomas/Weetman | (United States) 4 & 3 | Maxwell/Goalby |
| Huggett/Will | (United States) 5 & 4 | Palmer/Casper |
| Coles/G. Hunt | (United States) 2 & 1 | Littler/Finsterwald |
| Haliburton/B. Hunt | (United States) 1 up | Boros/Lema |
| 0 | Session | 4 |
| 2 | Overall | 6 |

== Saturday's matches ==
=== Morning four-ball ===
| | Results |
|---|---|---|
| Huggett/Thomas | (United States) 5 & 4 | Palmer/Finsterwald |
| Alliss/B. Hunt | halved | Littler/Boros |
| Weetman/Will | (United States) 3 & 2 | Casper/Maxwell |
| Coles/O'Connor | (United Kingdom) 1 up | Goalby/Ragan |
| 1 1/2 | Session | 2 1/2 |
| 3 1/2 | Overall | 8 1/2 |

=== Afternoon four-ball ===
| | Results |
|---|---|---|
| Coles/O'Connor | (United States) 3 & 2 | Palmer/Finsterwald |
| Alliss/B. Hunt | (United States) 1 up | Lema/Pott |
| Haliburton/G. Hunt | (United States) 2 & 1 | Casper/Maxwell |
| Huggett/Thomas | halved | Goalby/Ragan |
| 1/2 | Session | 3 1/2 |
| 4 | Overall | 12 |

== Sunday's matches ==
=== Morning singles ===
| | Results |
|---|---|---|
| Geoffrey Hunt | (United States) 5 & 3 | Tony Lema |
| Brian Huggett | (United Kingdom) 3 & 1 | Johnny Pott |
| Peter Alliss | (United Kingdom) 1 up | Arnold Palmer |
| Neil Coles | halved | Billy Casper |
| Dave Thomas | (United States) 3 & 2 | Bob Goalby |
| Christy O'Connor | (United States) 1 up | Gene Littler |
| Harry Weetman | (United Kingdom) 1 up | Julius Boros |
| Bernard Hunt | (United Kingdom) 2 up | Dow Finsterwald |
| 4 1/2 | Session | 3 1/2 |
| 8 1/2 | Overall | 15 1/2 |

=== Afternoon singles ===
| | Results |
|---|---|---|
| George Will | (United States) 3 & 2 | Arnold Palmer |
| Neil Coles | (United States) 2 & 1 | Dave Ragan |
| Peter Alliss | halved | Tony Lema |
| Tom Haliburton | (United States) 6 & 5 | Gene Littler |
| Harry Weetman | (United States) 2 & 1 | Julius Boros |
| Christy O'Connor | (United States) 2 & 1 | Billy Maxwell |
| Dave Thomas | (United States) 4 & 3 | Dow Finsterwald |
| Bernard Hunt | (United States) 2 & 1 | Bob Goalby |
| 1/2 | Session | 7 1/2 |
| 9 | Overall | 23 |

== Individual player records ==
Each entry refers to the win–loss–half record of the player.

=== United States ===
| Player | Points | Overall | Singles | Foursomes | Fourballs |
|---|---|---|---|---|---|
| Julius Boros | 3 | 2–1–2 | 1–1–0 | 1–0–1 | 0–0–1 |
| Billy Casper | 4.5 | 4–0–1 | 0–0–1 | 2–0–0 | 2–0–0 |
| Dow Finsterwald | 4.5 | 4–1–1 | 1–1–0 | 1–0–1 | 2–0–0 |
| Bob Goalby | 3.5 | 3–1–1 | 2–0–0 | 1–0–0 | 0–1–1 |
| Tony Lema | 4 | 3–0–2 | 1–0–1 | 1–0–1 | 1–0–0 |
| Gene Littler | 4 | 3–0–2 | 2–0–0 | 1–0–1 | 0–0–1 |
| Billy Maxwell | 4 | 4–0–0 | 1–0–0 | 1–0–0 | 2–0–0 |
| Arnold Palmer | 4 | 4–2–0 | 1–1–0 | 1–1–0 | 2–0–0 |
| Johnny Pott | 1 | 1–2–0 | 0–1–0 | 0–1–0 | 1–0–0 |
| Dave Ragan | 2.5 | 2–1–1 | 1–0–0 | 1–0–0 | 0–1–1 |

=== Great Britain ===
| Player | Points | Overall | Singles | Foursomes | Fourballs |
|---|---|---|---|---|---|
| Peter Alliss | 2 | 1–2–2 | 1–0–1 | 0–1–0 | 0–1–1 |
| Neil Coles | 2 | 1–3–2 | 0–1–1 | 0–1–1 | 1–1–0 |
| Tom Haliburton | 0 | 0–3–0 | 0–1–0 | 0–1–0 | 0–1–0 |
| Brian Huggett | 2.5 | 2–2–1 | 1–0–0 | 1–1–0 | 0–1–1 |
| Bernard Hunt | 2 | 1–3–2 | 1–1–0 | 0–1–1 | 0–1–1 |
| Geoffrey Hunt | 0 | 0–3–0 | 0–1–0 | 0–1–0 | 0–1–0 |
| Christy O'Connor | 1 | 1–4–0 | 0–2–0 | 0–1–0 | 1–1–0 |
| Dave Thomas | 1 | 0–4–2 | 0–2–0 | 0–1–1 | 0–1–1 |
| Harry Weetman | 1.5 | 1–3–1 | 1–1–0 | 0–1–1 | 0–1–0 |
| George Will | 1 | 1–3–0 | 0–1–0 | 1–1–0 | 0–1–0 |
