= Agfa-Gevaert Tournament =

Tournament information
- Location: Stoke Poges, Buckinghamshire, England
- Established: 1963
- Course: Stoke Poges Golf Club
- Format: Stroke play
- Month played: May
- Final year: 1971

Tournament record score
- Aggregate: 267 Jimmy Hitchcock (1965)

Final champion
- Peter Oosterhuis
- Location in England

The Agfa-Gevaert Tournament was a golf tournament in England from 1963 to 1971. It was played at Stoke Poges Golf Club in Stoke Poges, Buckinghamshire. It was sponsored by Agfa-Gevaert.

== Winners ==
Year	Winner	Country	Score	Margin of victory	Runner(s)-up	Winner's share (£)	Ref
Gevacolor Tournament
1963	Bernard Hunt	England	273	3 strokes	(Wales) Brian Huggett	1,000	
1964	Ángel Miguel	Spain	268	1 stroke	(Australia) Peter Thomson	750	
Agfa-Gevaert Tournament
1965	Jimmy Hitchcock	England	267	6 strokes	(England) David Snell	750	
1966	Ángel Miguel	Spain	275	2 strokes	(England) Hedley Muscroft	750	
1967	Peter Alliss	England	270	2 strokes	(England) Peter Butler	750	
Agfacolor Film Tournament
1968	Clive Clark	England	288	2 strokes	(England) Peter Alliss (England) Neil Coles (England) Tony Grubb (England) Jimmy Hitchcock	750	
1969	Brian Barnes	Scotland	277	3 strokes	(Scotland) Bernard Gallacher	750	
1970	Bernard Hunt	England	277	2 strokes	(England) Tommy Horton	750	
Agfa-Gevaert Tournament
1971	Peter Oosterhuis	England	276	2 strokes	(Scotland) Brian Barnes (Scotland) David Huish	1,000	
