= Classic International =

Golf tournament in England

Tournament information
- Location: Knowle, Solihull, Warwickshire, England
- Established: 1970
- Course: Copt Heath Golf Club
- Month played: July/August
- Final year: 1971

Final champion
- Peter Butler

Location in England

The Classic International was a professional golf tournament played at Copt Heath Golf Club in Knowle, Solihull, Warwickshire, England. The event was held twice, in 1970 and 1971. It was cancelled after organisers were unable to raise sufficient sponsorship to meet the British PGA minimum for the Order of Merit in 1972.

== Winners ==
Year	Winner	Country	Venue	Score	Margin of victory	Runner-up	Winner's share (£)	Ref
1970	Hedley Muscroft	England	Copt Heath Golf Club	282	Playoff (4th hole)	(Republic of Ireland) Christy O'Connor Snr	1,000	
1971	Peter Butler	England	Copt Heath Golf Club	277	1 stroke	(Wales) Kim Dabson	1,000	
