= Coombe Hill Assistants' Tournament =

Golf tournament in England

Tournament information
- Location: Kingston-Upon-Thames, Surrey, England
- Established: 1951
- Course(s): Coombe Hill Golf Club
- Month played: May
- Final year: 1964

Final champion
- Tony Jacklin (ENG)

Location in England

The Coombe Hill Assistants' Tournament was a professional golf tournament for assistant professionals played from 1951 to 1964.

== History ==
The Coombe Hill Club had held a 36-hole tournament for southern assistants for a few years before 1951. However, in 1951 the P.G.A. cancelled the PGA Assistants' Championship, leading the Coombe Hill Golf Club to open up their tournament to all assistants, and extending the event from 36 to 72 holes. It was later decided that the Gor-Ray Cup at Hartsbourne Golf Club would become the official Assistants' Championship. The Coombe Hill Assistants' Tournament acted as one of the two qualifying events for the Championship.

In 1952 the event was not open to foreign assistants. The event acted as the sole qualifying event for the Gor-Ray Cup in 1952 and 1953. With the Gor-Ray Cup becoming a 72-hole stroke-play event in 1954 the Coombe Hill Assistants' Tournament used a format similar to that previously used for the Gor-Ray Cup. There was a 36 stroke-play qualification stage, after which the leading 16 played match-play. In the 1954 event, assistants who had finished fourth or higher in a PGA tournament were not eligible to play. The event reverted to 72-hole medal play in 1955.

Coombe Hill hosted the PGA Assistants' Championship in 1983, 1984, 1985 and 1987.

== Winners ==
Year	Winner	Country	Score	Margin of victory	Runner(s)-up	Winner's share (£)	Ref
1951	Peter Mills	England	291	11 strokes	(Belgium) Arthur Devulder	100	
1952	Bernard Hunt	England	283	8 strokes	(England) Peter Mills	75	
1953	Bernard Hunt	England	277	8 strokes	(England) Fred Boobyer		
1954	Jimmy Martin	Ireland	19 holes		(England) Peter Mills	100	
1955	Peter Mills	England	284	3 strokes	(England) Peter Butler (England) Len Roberts	100	
1956	Alex Fox	Scotland	286	1 stroke	(England) David Beard	100	
1957	George Low	Scotland	280	1 stroke	(England) Neil Coles	100	
1958	Ross Whitehead	England	286	2 strokes	(England) A H Freeman (England) Geoffrey Hunt	100	
1959	Peter Gill	England	281	Playoff (6 holes)	(England) Billy Bingham	100	
1960	Neil Coles	England	280	1 stroke	(England) Lionel Platts	100	
1961	Lionel Platts	England	280	6 strokes	(England) Len Roberts		
1962	Geoffrey Hunt	England	274	6 strokes	(England) Len Roberts		
1963	Alex Caygill	England	216	2 strokes	(England) Malcolm Gregson (England) Tony Jacklin	100	
1964	Tony Jacklin	England	285	1 stroke	(England) Adrian Sadler	100	

The 1963 event was held at Selsdon Park Golf Club because of reconstruction work at Coombe Hill. Because of heavy rain on the first day, the tournament was reduced to 54 holes. The 1964 event was held at Hill Barn Golf Club, Worthing.
