= Senior Service Tournament =

Tournament information
- Location: United Kingdom
- Established: 1962
- Final year: 1966

Final champion
- Cobie Legrange

The Senior Service Tournament was a professional golf tournament. The event was played from 1962 and 1966 and was sponsored by Gallaher Ltd, a tobacco company which made Senior Service cigarettes.

== Winners ==
Year	Winner	Country	Venue	Score	Margin of victory	Runner(s)-up	Winner's share (£)	Ref
1962	Neil Coles	England	Dalmahoy Golf Club (& Ratho Park Golf Club)	277	1 stroke	(South Africa) Denis Hutchinson (Australia) Kel Nagle (Australia) Peter Thomson	2,000	
1963	Dave Ragan	United States	Dalmahoy Golf Club	271	2 strokes	(England) Peter Alliss	2,000	
1964	No tournament							
1965	Christy O'Connor Snr	Ireland	Dalmahoy Golf Club	203	1 stroke	(Republic of Ireland) Hugh Boyle (United States) Jacky Cupit	2,000	
1966	Cobie Legrange	South Africa	Northumberland Golf Club	272	2 strokes	(United States) Claude King	2,500	

The 1965 event was reduced to 54 holes because of bad weather. The first round was abandoned while the second round was played on the short West Course at Dalmahoy.
