= Clive Clark (golfer) =

English professional golfer

Personal information
- Full name: Clive Anthony Clark
- Nationality: England
- Born: 27 June 1945 (age 81) Winchester, Hampshire, England
- Height: 5 ft 10 in (178 cm)
- Spouse: Linda Catherine (nee Chase)
- Children: None

Career
- Sport: Golf
- Turned professional: 1965
- Former tour: European Tour
- Professional wins: 5

Best results in major championships
- Masters Tournament: CUT: 1968
- PGA Championship: DNP
- U.S. Open: DNP
- The Open Championship: T3: 1967

Clive Anthony Clark (born 27 June 1945) is an English professional golfer and more recently a broadcaster and golf course architect.

== Early life ==
Clark started playing golf at the age of 12. He was a Junior Member at both Scarborough North Cliff and Ganton, both golf clubs being in Yorkshire, England. His dedication to the sport resulted in early success, being runner-up in The Boys' Championship and in successive years was Captain of the British Boys' Team against Europe, and later Captained The English Youth's Team vs Scotland.

== Amateur career ==
Clark progressed in his late teens to be successful in major Amateur Championships. Clive was a winner of The Brabazon Trophy (The English Amateur Strokeplay), the 72-hole Lytham Trophy, and The Golf Illustrated Gold Vase played at Sunningdale. In the same year, he was also runner-up to Michael Bonallack in both The British Amateur Championship and The English Amateur Championship. On turning 20, Clark played in 1965 Walker Cup in Baltimore, Maryland where he was undefeated in his four matches and, in the last match out on the course, he holed a 33-foot putt on the last green for Great Britain to tie the USA.

== Professional career ==
Clark turned pro in 1965 and won The Danish Open the following year. In 1968, he won the Agfacolor Film Tournament and the Bowmaker Tournament. In 1970 he won the John Player Trophy, a 36-hole event which acted a qualifier for the John Player Classic. In 1974, playing with Peter Butler, he won the Sumrie-Bournemouth Better-Ball. Clark's best finish in a major championship was 1967 Open Championship when he tied for 3rd place with Gary Player at Royal Liverpool Golf Club. The only players to defeat him were runner-up Jack Nicklaus and the champion, Roberto De Vicenzo. He was also runner-up in the British PGA Championship, French Open, and lost a play-off to Gary Player in The Spanish Classic.

After his long career in professional golf, Clark spent 18 years as a golf commentator for BBC Television alongside Peter Alliss. During that period, he also worked on several occasions for CBS Television on The Masters in Augusta. He was also an announcer for The Australian Open (for the Australian Broadcasting Company) and The Million Dollar Challenge in South Africa (for the South African Broadcasting Corporation).

Clark and Peter Alliss formed their own golf course design company in the mid-1980s. Some of their work included Alcaidesa (just outside Sotogrande in Spain, now La Hacienda Links Golf Resort ), Pyrford Golf Club (in Surrey, England) and Castle Combe (in the Cotswolds area of northwest Wiltshire in England). In the mid-1990s, Clark formed his own golf course design company, Clive Clark Design, which is located in La Quinta, California. The company has won many national and international awards for their design work. Clark's designs include Dumbarnie Links, Lake Winnipesaukee, Belgrade Lakes, The Hideaway, Celebrity Course at Indian Wells Resort, and Eagle Falls.

== Amateur wins ==
- 1965 Brabazon Trophy (3-way tie), Lytham Trophy (tie with Michael Bonallack), Golf Illustrated Gold Vase

== Professional wins (5) ==
this list may be incomplete

- 1966 Danish Open
- 1968 Agfacolor Film Tournament, Bowmaker Tournament
- 1970 John Player Trophy
- 1974 Sumrie-Bournemouth Better-Ball (with Peter Butler)

== Playoff record ==
European Tour playoff record (0–1)

| No. | Year | Tournament | Opponent | Result |
|---|---|---|---|---|
| 1 | 1972 | French Open | (United States) Barry Jaeckel | Lost to par on second extra hole |

== Results in major championships ==
| Tournament | 1964 | 1965 | 1966 | 1967 | 1968 | 1969 | 1970 | 1971 | 1972 | 1973 | 1974 |
|---|---|---|---|---|---|---|---|---|---|---|---|
| Masters Tournament | | | | | CUT | | | | | | |
| The Open Championship | CUT | CUT | CUT | T3 | CUT | | T17 | CUT | T11 | CUT | CUT |

Note: Clark only played in the Masters Tournament and The Open Championship.

Top 10
Did not play

CUT = missed the half-way cut (3rd round cut in 1968, 1971 and 1974 Open Championships)
"T" indicates a tie for a place

== Team appearances ==
Amateur

- Walker Cup (representing Great Britain & Ireland): 1965 (tied)
- St Andrews Trophy (representing Great Britain & Ireland): 1964 (winners)
- European Amateur Team Championship (representing England): 1965

Professional

- Ryder Cup (representing Great Britain & Ireland): 1973

== See also ==
- Spring 1968 PGA Tour Qualifying School graduates
