= Peter Alliss =

English golfer and broadcaster (1931–2020)

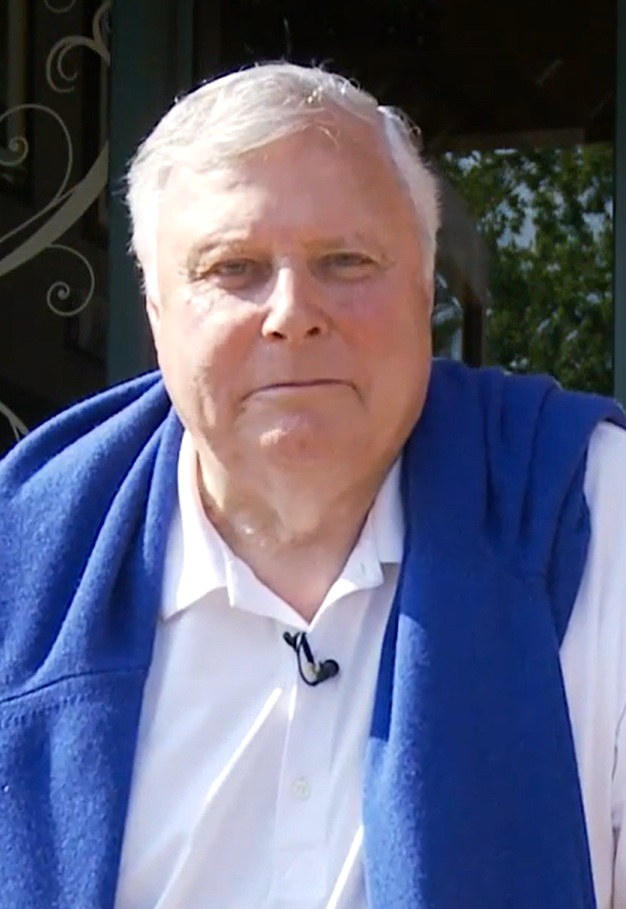
- Alliss in 2011

Personal information
- Full name: Peter Alliss
- Nationality: England
- Born: 28 February 1931 Berlin, Germany
- Died: 5 December 2020 (aged 89) Hindhead, Surrey, England
- Spouses: Joan McGuinness (m.1953); Jackie (m.1972)
- Children: 6

Career
- Sport: Golf
- Turned professional: 1947
- Professional wins: 31

Best results in major championships
- Masters Tournament: CUT: 1966, 1967
- PGA Championship: DNP
- U.S. Open: DNP
- The Open Championship: 8th/T8: 1954, 1961, 1962, 1969

Achievements and awards
- World Golf Hall of Fame: 2012 (member page)
- Harry Vardon Trophy: 1964, 1966

Peter Alliss (28 February 1931 – 5 December 2020) was an English professional golfer, television presenter, commentator, author and golf course designer. Following the death of Henry Longhurst in 1978, as lead golf analyst for the BBC and an analyst for ABC Sports, he was regarded by many as the "Voice of golf". In 2012 he was inducted into the World Golf Hall of Fame in the Lifetime Achievement category.

Between 1952 and 1969, Alliss won 20 professional tournaments, including three British PGA Championships, in 1957, 1962 and 1965. He had five top-10 finishes in the Open Championship, coming closest in 1954 at Royal Birkdale when he finished four shots behind the champion Peter Thomson.

Alliss played on eight Ryder Cup teams between 1953 and 1969 with a record of 10 wins, 15 losses and 5 halved matches. He played on Great Britain's victorious 1957 Ryder Cup Team. Peter and his father Percy were the first father and son to both participate in and both win the Ryder Cup. Alliss also represented England in the World Cup on 10 occasions.

== Early life ==
Alliss's father Percy was one of the leading British professional golfers in the 1920s and 1930s, winning many tournaments in Britain and Continental Europe. Peter Alliss was born in Berlin while his father was employed as a club professional at the Wannsee Golf Club. He weighed 14 lb 11 oz (6.7 kg) at birth, reputed to be a European record at the time. Peter had an older brother, Percy Alexander, known as Alec. Alec was born in 1924 and was also a professional golfer.

Percy returned from Germany in early 1932, when Peter was about a year old. Peter attended a private boarding school in the south of England which he left at the age of 14, the minimum school leaving age.

== Professional career ==
In 1946, Alliss played golf for England boys against Scotland, winning both his foursomes and singles matches. In the subsequent Boys Amateur Championship, Alliss was the favourite but lost in the quarter-finals to Donald Dunstan from Manchester at the 19th hole.

Alliss turned professional in 1947, at the age of 16, as an assistant to his father at Ferndown Golf Club in Dorset. Peter and Percy travelled to the Royal Liverpool Golf Club in Hoylake to play in the 1947 Open Championship. Peter scored 86 in his first qualifying round on the Championship course and failed to qualify. Percy also struggled on the Hoylake course and failed to qualify by a stroke after rounds of 74 and 82.

In 1948, Alliss impressed in the Coombe Hill Assistants' Tournament but came to more prominence in the Manchester Evening Chronicle Tournament where his 69 was the only score under 70 on the final day. He finished tied for 9th and won the assistants' prize. He also won the assistant's prize in the West of England Championship. The PGA Assistants' Championship was restarted in 1949 and Alliss finished tied for 2nd place, five strokes behind Harry Weetman, 10 years his senior.

From June 1949 to June 1951, Alliss served two years' National Service in the RAF Regiment. This limited his golfing activities although he did play in a few tournaments during this period.

In 1952, Alliss finished tied for 5th place in the Coombe Hill Assistants' Tournament, qualifying him for the Gor-Ray Cup, the Assistants' Championship, from 20 to 22 May. He won three of his four matches comfortably but only beat John Vamplew at the 21st hole in the quarter-finals. In the 36-hole final he beat Tony Harman 5&4.

Alliss had a slow start to the 1953 season but had a good July, finishing tied for 9th in the Open Championship and third in the Irish Open. In mid-August, Alliss was included in a group of 17 from which the Ryder Cup team would be chosen. The PGA arranged a series of trial matches at Wentworth starting on 23 September, and Alliss performed well enough that he was included in the team which was announced on 26 September. Alliss was just 22 years old, the second youngest British Ryder Cup player at that time, a few months older than Henry Cotton in 1929. Alliss was paired with Harry Weetman in the opening day foursomes but lost 2&1. Late on the final day, all matches had been completed except for the two singles matches involving Alliss against Jim Turnesa and 23-year-old Bernard Hunt against Dave Douglas. The British team needed 1½ points from these two matches to win the Ryder Cup or a point to tie. Alliss had gone 1 up at the 14th but he 3-putted the 15th while Turnesa got down in two from a bunker. Alliss then went out of bounds at the 17th to give Turnesa the lead. Turnesa was in the trees at the last and still short of the green in 3. However, Alliss, just off the green in 2, fluffed his chip, and eventually halved the hole in 6, to guarantee that the USA would retain the Ryder Cup. In the final match, at the 18th, Bernard Hunt missed a 4-foot putt that he needed to hole to win his match and so the USA won 6½ to 5½.

Alliss's first major success came in the 1954 Daks Tournament at Little Aston Golf Club. On the final day he was drawn with Bernard Hunt in the first pair out. Alliss scored 70 in the morning round and 67 in the afternoon. Bobby Locke, the eventual runner-up, was able to see Alliss finishing his final round before he started his own. Three hours after Alliss had finished, Locke need a 4 at the last to tie with Alliss. However, he put his second into a bunker at the front of the green and took 5. Alliss and Hunt had taken 4 hours and 10 minutes for their two rounds of the 6,681 yards course. Alliss said: "We took all the time we wanted to play our shots, but we walked smartly between the strokes." Two weeks later, in the 1954 Open Championship, Alliss improved on his 1953 performance, finishing tied for 8th place. The season ended with Alliss playing for the British Isles against the Rest of Europe in the inaugural Joy Cup.

In early 1955, Alliss travelled to the USA and played in a number of events there. On his return he missed the cut in the Spalding Tournament but then won the 5-round Dunlop Tournament at Wentworth. After this win Alliss had a disappointing season and although he finished tied for 5th in the Dunlop Masters, he was not chosen for the Ryder Cup team. Alliss had not been in the top 7 in the Order of Merit after the Open Championship and was relying on being one of the three selections after the Dunlop Masters. 1956 was a relatively disappointing year, although the year ended on a high note when he won the Spanish Open by 6 strokes at the new course at Real Club de Golf El Prat.

1957 started with Alliss moving from Ferndown to nearby Parkstone Golf Club, where he was appointed full professional, following the death of Reg Whitcombe. The year was much more successful than 1956. In early April he won the PGA Close Championship in Llandudno by 3 strokes. Later in the month, he finished second in the Spalding Tournament and in May he was tied for second in the Swallow-Penfold Tournament. He was third in the Yorkshire Evening News Tournament in June and tied for 12th in the 1957 Open Championship. Qualification rules for the 1957 Ryder Cup had been changed and covered the whole of the 1956 season, ending with the 1957 Open. After his disappointing 1956 Alliss started 1957 in 18th place but his good season lifted him to 5th, earning him a place in the team. His good form continued with a joint-second in the French Open and another second place in the Dunlop Masters. Alliss finished second in the Order of Merit with a stroke average of 71.21, behind Eric Brown on 70.99. The Ryder Cup ended in a rare victory for the British team, although Alliss lost both his matches and was the only British player to lose his singles.

In October 1958, Alliss won the Italian, Spanish and Portuguese Opens in three successive weeks.

His first round of 63 in the 1961 British PGA Championship was a tournament record at the time and remained the joint-lowest round in the tournament until Robert Karlsson's round of 62 in 2010.

Alliss's competitive career was almost over by the time the European Tour was formally established in 1972, but he played in some events in the Tour's early years, making his last appearance on the tour in 1974.

=== Broadcasting career ===
His first television work was for the BBC at the 1961 Open Championship, when he was still a golfer who had competed in the tournament. After his retirement as a player, Alliss worked full-time in television, becoming the lead BBC golf commentator in 1978.

Alliss gave Sean Connery golf lessons before the filming of the 1964 James Bond film Goldfinger, which involved a scene where Connery, as Bond, played golf against gold magnate Auric Goldfinger at Stoke Park Golf Club in Buckinghamshire. The lessons started a lifelong love of playing golf for Connery.

Alliss also worked for ESPN and ABC Sports in the United States from 1975 through 2010. He continued to appear as a guest analyst on ESPN's coverage of the Open Championship from 2011 to 2015.

As well as being a commentator for the BBC, Alliss also worked part-time for the Australian Broadcasting Corporation, and the Canadian Broadcasting Corporation. He was widely regarded as the best known golf broadcaster in Britain. He hosted a total of 140 Pro Celebrity Golf TV programmes.

Between 1979 and 1986 Alliss hosted 7 series of Around with Alliss, initially broadcast on BBC2. Each series consisted of 6 programmes in which Alliss played a few holes of golf and chatted with a variety of famous people on a number of courses in the UK. In 1997 the format was revived for a six-part television series called A Golfer's Travels. This series featured Alliss in a variety of locations around the world.

Alliss was also involved in golf course architecture. His first course design partner was Dave Thomas, with whom he created over 50 courses, including The Belfry, which has staged the Ryder Cup several times and is now the home of the Professional Golfers' Association. Alliss then joined forces with Clive Clark, and added another 22 courses to his portfolio (including Old Thorns Golf Course in Hampshire). He was the club president at Old Thorns Golf Club in Hampshire and also at Castlemartyr Links Golf Club in Cork, Ireland.

Alliss became captain of the Professional Golfers' Association for the second time in 1987. He was also the president of the British Greenkeepers' Association, and was the first president of the European Women's Professional Golfers' Association.

In 2002, Alliss was awarded the honorary degree of Doctor of Letters by Bournemouth University. In 2003, Alliss published an illustrated book, Peter Alliss's Golf Heroes, which won the 'Best Illustrated Book' category of the British Sports Book Awards. In July 2005, he was honoured by the University of St Andrews, shortly before The Open Golf Championship, with the honorary degree of Doctor of Laws.

In 2012, Alliss was chosen to receive the Golf Foundation's 'Spirit of Golf award' not only in recognition of the way he had made the sport entertaining in the eyes of young people, but also for the support he had given to junior golf and his commitment to the Golf Foundation over many years.

Alliss revealed that in 1993 he turned down an appointment as Officer of the Order of the British Empire (OBE) for services to golf.

In 2014, Alliss helped to create and provide commentary on the video flyovers of all five course layouts of a favourite classic links course at Seaton Carew Golf Club in North East England, and commented during these programmes that the Seaton links were "the tenth oldest in England and a true championship links to challenge all levels of players."

Alliss was a patron of the Wildlife Ark Trust, which is committed to the conservation in the UK of the red squirrel and the water vole.

=== Criticism of players ===
In 1999, Alliss received criticism from sections of the British media for scathing comments he made when Jean van de Velde folded in the Open Championship at Carnoustie. The Frenchman had a triple-bogey seven on the final hole when he only needed a double-bogey six to win the Open. During his commentary, Alliss branded Jean van de Velde's actions as "totally ridiculous" and said he was guilty of "pure madness". Some critics accused Alliss of being "curmudgeonly", to which he responded that "...it certainly wasn't my intention".

Alliss is reported to have previously had a frosty relationship with Nick Faldo, after Faldo was infuriated at Alliss describing him as "a typical only child". However, Alliss and Faldo later went on to work together at ABC Sports from 2004 to 2007, and again as part of the BBC's broadcast commentary team for the 2012 Open Championship.

In May 2008, Alliss was involved in a heated exchange of views with English golfer Nick Dougherty over the course conditions at Wentworth Club during the BMW PGA Championship. After Alliss had spoken out in his commentary against the poor scoring from players and their complaints over the condition of the Wentworth greens, Dougherty accused Alliss of "disgusting commentary" and of being "out of touch". Dougherty said: "I wish we could have taken him out there and shown him how difficult it was." Alliss responded by accusing Dougherty and his generation of being "delicate", "thin-skinned", and unable to take constructive criticism.

In a 2011 interview, Alliss criticised Tiger Woods, saying: "The aura has gone. He used to be nicer and he became grumpy. He hasn't done anything to recapture the public's affection." Alliss said that he doesn't believe that Woods will surpass Jack Nicklaus's record of 18 major championships. A year earlier, in 2010, Alliss said of Woods: "I think his father has a lot to do with how Tiger is. His father was a frightening bully."

During the 2013 Open Championship at Muirfield, Alliss criticised Ian Poulter for making what he said were "childish comments" after his opening round of 72 in the tournament. Poulter said some of the pin positions were a "joke" and the 18th needed a "windmill and a clown face", like a crazy golf course. Alliss responded by saying: "Poulter's remarks are just childish. You can't say stuff about windmills and clown's faces. It's just ridiculous. I never heard Jack Nicklaus or Arnold Palmer come out with comments like that. A lot of others give up before they even get going. It's a PhD not an O-level."

== Personal life ==
Alliss was first married in 1953 to Joan McGuinness. They had two children, Gary (born 1954) and Carol (born 1960). In 1972, Alliss married his second wife, Jackie. With Jackie, Alliss had two daughters, Sara and Victoria and two sons, Simon and Henry. Victoria was born severely disabled and died at the age of 11. Gary is a professional golfer and teacher and was captain of the Great Britain and Ireland PGA Cup team in 2007 and 2009.

For over 30 years Alliss lived in the village of Hindhead in Surrey, in a large house set in five acres of land. In 2010, at the age of 79, Alliss said that he was still able to shoot a golf score under his age (fewer shots than 79).

== Death ==
Alliss died on 5 December 2020, aged 89 at his home in Surrey, England. His death was described as "unexpected but peaceful". Barbara Slater, director of BBC Sport, said: "Peter was the voice of golf. He transcended the sport as one of its greatest broadcasters of his generation."

== Professional wins (31) ==
=== British PGA circuit wins (15) ===
Date	Tournament	Winning score	Margin of victory	Runner(s)-up
22 May 1952	Gor-Ray Cup	5&4 in final		(England) Tony Harman
25 Jun 1954	Daks Tournament	73-69-70-67=279	1 stroke	(South Africa) Bobby Locke
6 May 1955	Dunlop Tournament	75-70-72-72-70=359	1 stroke	(Scotland) Eric Brown
5 Apr 1957	PGA Close Championship	72-66-74-74=286	3 strokes	(England) Charlie Ward
8 May 1959	Dunlop Tournament	70-73-68-69=280	1 stroke	(England) Henry Cotton, (Wales) Dai Rees
7 Apr 1962	Schweppes PGA Close Championship	72-(72)-72-71=287	1 stroke	(England) Ralph Moffitt, (Republic of Ireland) Christy O'Connor Snr
15 Jun 1963	Daks Tournament	70-72-66-72=280	Tie	(England) Neil Coles
9 May 1964	Swallow-Penfold Tournament	71-78-70-74=293	1 stroke	(England) Alex Caygill, (England) Hedley Muscroft
25 Jul 1964	Esso Golden Tournament	25 points (12-1-1)	7 points	(Republic of Ireland) Christy O'Connor Snr, (Wales) Dave Thomas
1 May 1965	Schweppes PGA Close Championship	72-69-75-70=286	Playoff	(England) Peter Butler
12 Jun 1965	Jeyes Tournament	67-69-66-69=271	4 strokes	(Wales) Dave Thomas
21 May 1966	Martini International	71-66-71-67=275	Tie	(England) Bill Large
2 Oct 1966	Rediffusion Tournament	68-63-67-69=267	1 stroke	(England) Tony Jacklin
13 May 1967	Agfa-Gevaert Tournament	67-64-70-69=270	2 strokes	(England) Peter Butler
19 Jul 1969	Piccadilly Medal	76-73=149 in final	37 holes	(Scotland) George Will

British PGA circuit Playoff record (1–1)

Season	Tournament	Opponent(s)	Result
1960	Sprite International	(South Africa) Harold Henning, (South Africa) Gary Player	Henning won with 4 on first extra hole
1965	Schweppes PGA Close Championship	(England) Peter Butler	Won with 4 on first extra hole

=== Continental European wins ===
Date	Tournament	Winning score	Margin of victory	Runner(s)-up
27 Oct 1956	Spanish Open	69-73-72-71=285	6 strokes	(England) Bernard Hunt
Oct 1958	Italian Open	282	10 strokes	(Italy) Alfonso Angelini
19 Oct 1958	Spanish Open	68-71-67-62=268	10 strokes	(Scotland) John Panton
28 Oct 1958	Portuguese Open	63-65-69-67=264	3 strokes	(Spain) Ángel Miguel

=== Other wins (12) ===
this list is probably incomplete

- 1956 West of England Professional Championship
- 1958 Sunningdale Foursomes (with Jean Donald), West of England Professional Championship
- 1959 Wentworth Foursomes (with Harold Ridgley)
- 1961 Sunningdale Foursomes (with Jean Anderson), Strong Country Tournament, Brazil Open
- 1962 West of England Professional Championship, Strong Country Tournament
- 1963 Strong Country Tournament
- 1964 Strong Country Tournament
- 1966 West of England Professional Championship

== Results in major championships ==
Tournament	1951	1952	1953	1954	1955	1956	1957	1958	1959
Masters Tournament									
The Open Championship	CUT	T31	T9	T8	CUT	CUT	T12	T11	T16

Tournament	1960	1961	1962	1963	1964	1965	1966	1967	1968	1969
Masters Tournament							CUT	CUT		
The Open Championship	CUT	T8	T8	T18	CUT	T47	T20	WD	T13	8

Tournament	1970	1971	1972	1973	1974
Masters Tournament					
The Open Championship	T32	T47	T31	T51	CUT

Note: Alliss only played in the Masters Tournament and The Open Championship.

Top 10
Did not play

CUT = missed the half-way cut
WD = Withdrew
"T" indicates a tie for a place

== Team appearances ==
- Ryder Cup (representing Great Britain): 1953, 1957 (winners), 1959, 1961, 1963, 1965, 1967, 1969 (tie)
- World Cup (representing England): 1954, 1955, 1957, 1958, 1959, 1961, 1962, 1964, 1966, 1967
- Joy Cup (representing the British Isles): 1954 (winners), 1955 (winners), 1956 (winners), 1958 (winners)
- Amateurs–Professionals Match (representing the Professionals): 1957 (winners), 1958, 1959 (winners)
- R.T.V. International Trophy (representing England): 1967 (winners, captain)
