= 1969 Ryder Cup =

18th edition; golf tournament in England

18th Ryder Cup Matches
- Dates: 18–20 September 1969
- Venue: Royal Birkdale Golf Club
- Location: Southport, England
- Captains: Eric Brown (Great Britain); Sam Snead (USA)
(United Kingdom)	16	16	(United States)
- United States retains the Ryder Cup

Location map
- Location within England

The 18th Ryder Cup Matches were held 18–20 September 1969 at the Royal Birkdale Golf Club in Southport, England. The competition ended in a tie at 16 points each when America's Jack Nicklaus conceded a three-foot (0.9 m) putt to Britain's Tony Jacklin at the 18th hole, in one of the most famous gestures of sportsmanship in all of sports. It was the first tie in Ryder Cup history, and the United States team retained the Cup.

The matches were marred by considerable acrimony and unsportsmanlike behavior by players on both sides. Britain's captain, Eric Brown, had instructed his players not to search for the opposition's ball if it ended up in the rough. American Ken Still, in the first-day foursomes, had deliberately and regularly stood too close to Briton Maurice Bembridge as he was putting. During one of the fourballs on the second day, both captains had to come out and calm down the warring players. This led to Nicklaus conceding Jacklin's final putt with the knowledge that the overall competition would end in a draw. On the previous hole, Jacklin sank a long eagle putt while Nicklaus missed his from 15 feet (4.5 m) and the match was squared. Jacklin had won the Open Championship two months earlier at nearby Royal Lytham & St Annes to become the first British champion in eighteen years. After holing his final putt for par, Nicklaus picked up Jacklin's ball marker and told him, "I don't think you would have missed it, but I wasn't going to give you the chance, either."

Playing in his first Ryder Cup at age 29, Nicklaus' gesture became known as "the concession" and marked the beginning of a lasting friendship that has spanned nearly a half-century. It inspired The Concession Golf Club in Florida near Sarasota, which was co-designed by Nicklaus and Jacklin. The two were opposing captains in the competition in 1983 and 1987. While the concession is now viewed as one of the world's greatest acts of sportsmanship, U.S. captain Sam Snead was furious that the chance of outright victory had been given away.

The U.S. team had only two players with previous Ryder Cup experience, Billy Casper and Gene Littler. The team was the only one that Arnold Palmer was not a member of from his first appearance in 1961 through his final appearance in 1973.

== Format ==
The Ryder Cup is a match play event, with each match worth one point. From 1963 through 1971 the competition format was as follows:

- Day 1 — 8 foursomes (alternate shot) matches, 4 each in morning and afternoon sessions
- Day 2 — 8 four-ball (better ball) matches, 4 each in morning and afternoon sessions
- Day 3 — 16 singles matches, 8 each in morning and afternoon sessions

With a total of 32 points, 16 1/2 points were required to win the Cup, or 16 points were needed for the current champion to retain the Cup. All matches were played to a maximum of 18 holes.

== Teams ==
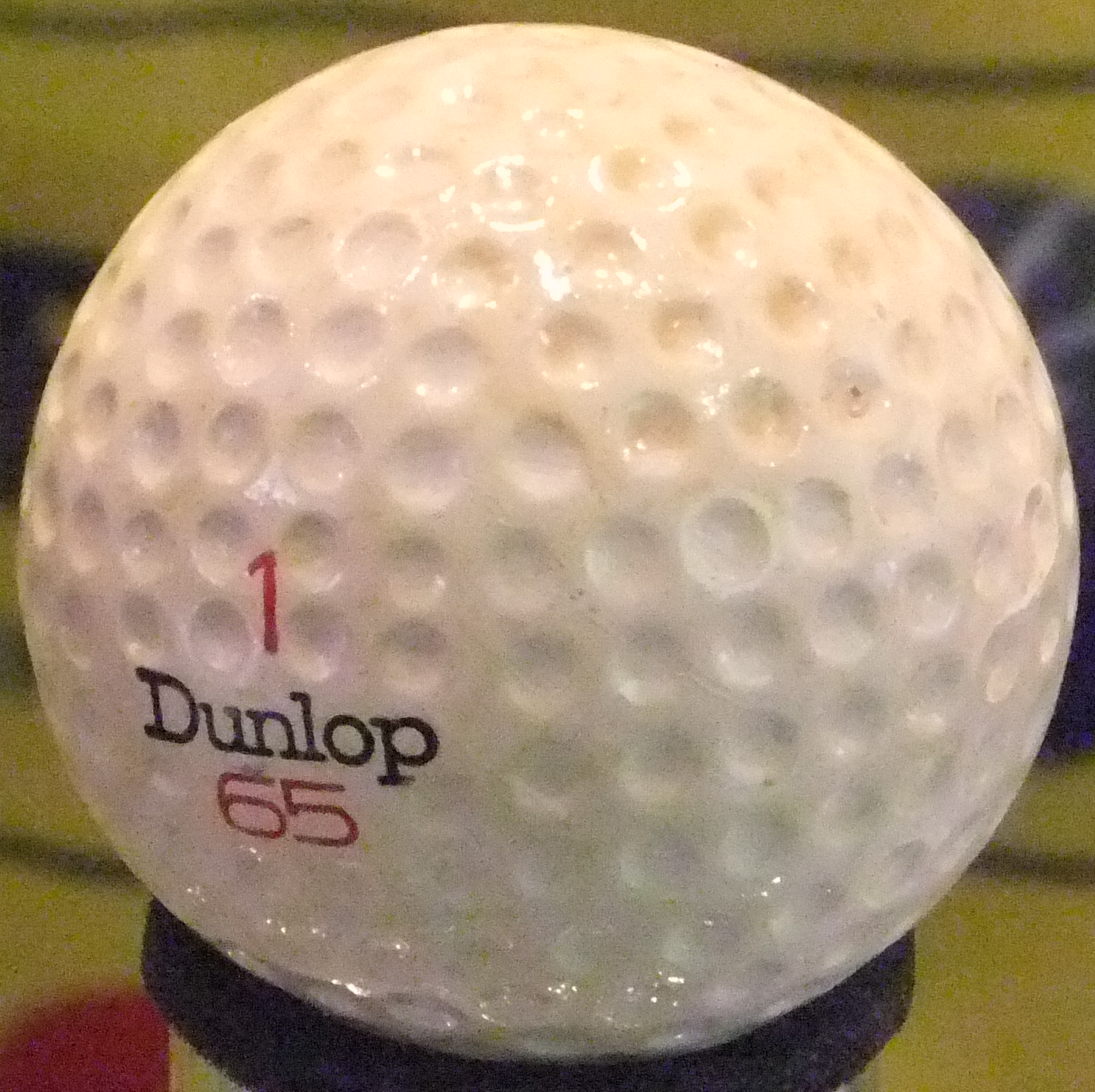
Tony Jacklin's golf ball used in the 1969 Ryder Cup held at Royal Birkdale Golf Club

Six places in the team were allocated to the leaders of a points list after the 1969 Open Championship. An Order of Merit style system was used, with points earned over the previous 12 months, the best 7 performances to count. The leading six were O'Connor, Huggett, Butler, Townsend, Coles and Barnes. The remaining six places were chosen by the committee the following week.

Team Great Britain
Name	Age	Previous Ryder Cups	Matches	W–L–H	Winning percentage
(Scotland) Eric Brown	44	Non-playing captain
(England) Peter Alliss	38	7	27	10–13–4	44.44
(Scotland) Brian Barnes	24	0	Rookie
(England) Maurice Bembridge	24	0	Rookie
(England) Peter Butler	37	1	5	0–3–2	20.00
(England) Alex Caygill	29	0	Rookie
(England) Neil Coles	34	4	21	7–11–3	40.48
(Scotland) Bernard Gallacher	20	0	Rookie
(Wales) Brian Huggett	32	2	10	3–5–2	40.00
(England) Bernard Hunt	39	7	26	6–15–5	32.69
(England) Tony Jacklin	25	1	6	2–3–1	41.67
(Republic of Ireland) Christy O'Connor Snr	44	7	23	7–15–1	32.61
(England) Peter Townsend	23	0	Rookie

This was the first Ryder Cup for Nicklaus, age 29. Despite having won his seventh major title as a professional in 1967, eligibility rules set by the PGA prevented him from competing in previous editions. He competed as a player through 1981, missing only the 1979 edition, and was the non-playing captain of the U.S. team in 1983 and 1987.

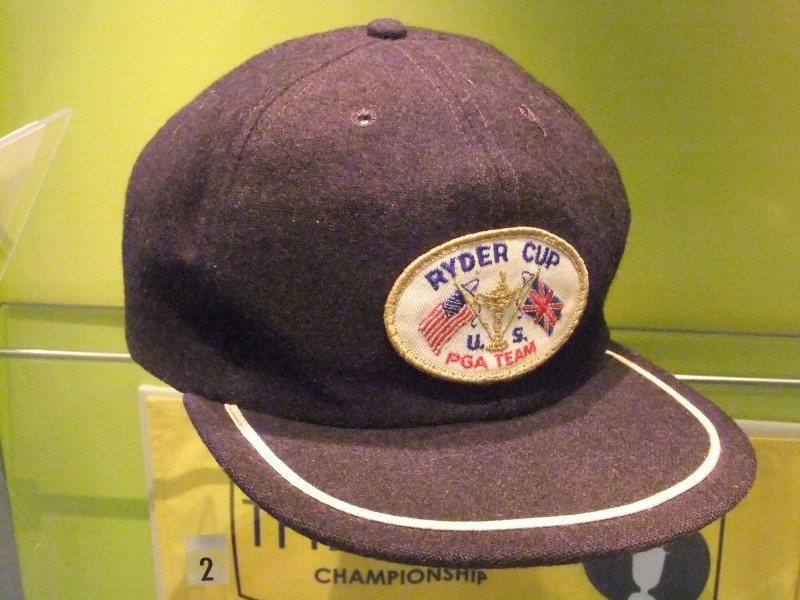
Lee Trevino's cap from the 1969 Ryder Cup played at Royal Birkdale Golf Club

Team USA
Name	Age	Previous Ryder Cups	Matches	W–L–H	Winning percentage
Sam Snead	57	Non-playing captain
Tommy Aaron	32	0	Rookie
Miller Barber	38	0	Rookie
Frank Beard	30	0	Rookie
Billy Casper	38	4	19	12–3–4	73.68
Dale Douglass	33	0	Rookie
Raymond Floyd	27	0	Rookie
Dave Hill	32	0	Rookie
Gene Littler	39	4	18	6–4–8	55.56
Jack Nicklaus	29	0	Rookie
Dan Sikes	39	0	Rookie
Ken Still	34	0	Rookie
Lee Trevino	29	0	Rookie

== Thursday's matches ==
=== Morning foursomes ===
	Results
Coles/Huggett	(United Kingdom) 3 & 2	Barber/Floyd
Gallacher/Bembridge	(United Kingdom) 2 & 1	Trevino/Still
Jacklin/Townsend	(United Kingdom) 3 & 1	Hill/Aaron
O'Connor/Alliss	halved	Casper/Beard
3 1/2	Session	1/2
3 1/2	Overall	1/2

=== Afternoon foursomes ===
	Results
Coles/Huggett	(United States) 1 up	Hill/Aaron
Gallacher/Bembridge	(United States) 1 up	Trevino/Littler
Jacklin/Townsend	(United Kingdom) 1 up	Casper/Beard
Butler/Hunt	(United States) 1 up	Nicklaus/Sikes
1	Session	3
4 1/2	Overall	3 1/2

== Friday's matches ==
=== Morning four-ball ===
	Results
O'Connor/Townsend	(United Kingdom) 1 up	Hill/Douglass
Huggett/Caygill	halved	Floyd/Barber
Barnes/Alliss	(United States) 1 up	Trevino/Littler
Jacklin/Coles	(United Kingdom) 1 up	Nicklaus/Sikes
2 1/2	Session	1 1/2
7	Overall	5

=== Afternoon four-ball ===
	Results
Butler/Townsend	(United States) 2 up	Casper/Beard
Huggett/Gallacher	(United States) 2 & 1	Hill/Still
Bembridge/Hunt	halved	Aaron/Floyd
Jacklin/Coles	halved	Trevino/Barber
1	Session	3
8	Overall	8

== Saturday's matches ==
=== Morning singles ===
	Results
Peter Alliss	(United States) 2 & 1	Lee Trevino
Peter Townsend	(United States) 5 & 4	Dave Hill
Neil Coles	(United Kingdom) 1 up	Tommy Aaron
Brian Barnes	(United States) 1 up	Billy Casper
Christy O'Connor	(United Kingdom) 5 & 4	Frank Beard
Maurice Bembridge	(United Kingdom) 1 up	Ken Still
Peter Butler	(United Kingdom) 1 up	Raymond Floyd
Tony Jacklin	(United Kingdom) 4 & 3	Jack Nicklaus
5	Session	3
13	Overall	11

=== Afternoon singles ===
	Results
Brian Barnes	(United States) 4 & 2	Dave Hill
Bernard Gallacher	(United Kingdom) 4 & 3	Lee Trevino
Maurice Bembridge	(United States) 7 & 6	Miller Barber
Peter Butler	(United Kingdom) 3 & 2	Dale Douglass
Neil Coles	(United States) 4 & 3	Dan Sikes
Christy O'Connor	(United States) 2 & 1	Gene Littler
Brian Huggett	halved	Billy Casper
Tony Jacklin	halved	Jack Nicklaus
3	Session	5
16	Overall	16

== Individual player records ==
Each entry refers to the win–loss–half record of the player.

=== Great Britain ===
Player	Points	Overall	Singles	Foursomes	Fourballs
Peter Alliss	0.5	0–2–1	0–1–0	0–0–1	0–1–0
Brian Barnes	0	0–3–0	0–2–0	0–0–0	0–1–0
Maurice Bembridge	2.5	2–2–1	1–1–0	1–1–0	0–0–1
Peter Butler	2	2–2–0	2–0–0	0–1–0	0–1–0
Alex Caygill	0.5	0–0–1	0–0–0	0–0–0	0–0–1
Neil Coles	3.5	3–2–1	1–1–0	1–1–0	1–0–1
Bernard Gallacher	2	2–2–0	1–0–0	1–1–0	0–1–0
Brian Huggett	2	1–2–2	0–0–1	1–1–0	0–1–1
Bernard Hunt	0.5	0–1–1	0–0–0	0–1–0	0–0–1
Tony Jacklin	5	4–0–2	1–0–1	2–0–0	1–0–1
Christy O'Connor	2.5	2–1–1	1–1–0	0–0–1	1–0–0
Peter Townsend	3	3–2–0	0–1–0	2–0–0	1–1–0

=== United States ===
Player	Points	Overall	Singles	Foursomes	Fourballs
Tommy Aaron	1.5	1–2–1	0–1–0	1–1–0	0–0–1
Miller Barber	2	1–1–2	1–0–0	0–1–0	0–0–2
Frank Beard	1.5	1–2–1	0–1–0	0–1–1	1–0–0
Billy Casper	3	2–1–2	1–0–1	0–1–1	1–0–0
Dale Douglass	0	0–2–0	0–1–0	0–0–0	0–1–0
Raymond Floyd	1	0–2–2	0–1–0	0–1–0	0–0–2
Dave Hill	4	4–2–0	2–0–0	1–1–0	1–1–0
Gene Littler	3	3–0–0	1–0–0	1–0–0	1–0–0
Jack Nicklaus	1.5	1–2–1	0–1–1	1–0–0	0–1–0
Dan Sikes	2	2–1–0	1–0–0	1–0–0	0–1–0
Ken Still	1	1–2–0	0–1–0	0–1–0	1–0–0
Lee Trevino	3.5	3–2–1	1–1–0	1–1–0	1–0–1
