= Denis Hutchinson =

South African professional golfer (born 1932)

Personal information
- Full name: Denis John Hutchinson
- Nickname: Hutchie
- Nationality: Zimbabwe; South Africa
- Born: 14 March 1932 (age 94) Umtali, Rhodesia (now Mutare, Zimbabwe)
- Height: 1.83 m (6 ft 0 in)

Career
- Sport: Golf
- Turned professional: 1959
- Former tour: South African Tour
- Professional wins: 15

Best results in major championships
- Masters Tournament: CUT: 1960, 1962
- PGA Championship: DNP
- U.S. Open: CUT: 1960
- The Open Championship: T16: 1962

Denis John Hutchinson (born 14 March 1932) is a former South African professional golfer. Hutchinson was born and raised in Rhodesia but moved to South Africa as a young adult. He represented South Africa in several elite amateur events, including the Commonwealth Tournament and Eisenhower Trophy. He also had much success in professional events as an amateur, culminating with a victory at the 1959 South African Open. He turned professional shortly thereafter and played primarily in South Africa and Europe. In South Africa he won many events, including the South African Masters three times, as well as four significant tournaments in Europe. After he retired Hutchinson became a notable broadcasters, earning the label "Voice of Golf" in South Africa.

== Early life and amateur career ==
Hutchinson was born in Umtali, Southern Rhodesia in 1932.

In 1953, Hutchinson qualified for the South African Amateur as medallist. He won the Proudfoot Trophy for this accomplishment. He was also low amateur at the Transvaal Open that year.

In June 1954, Hutchinson played the Commonwealth Tournament in St Andrews Golf Club in Scotland. The event included Great Britain and a number of countries from the British Commonwealth against each other. In a foursomes match, Hutchinson and partner Jim Boyd lost to Australians Doug Bachii and Peter Heard, 2 and 1. South Africa ultimately finished in fourth place out of five teams. In 1954, he was again medallist at the qualifying stage of the South African Amateur. He played well at the event proper, reaching the finals. In the finals, he lost to A.D. Jackson on the 37th hole.

In 1955, while still an amateur, he began to have continuous success at professional tournaments. That year he won the Natal Open. The following year he won the Southern Rhodesian Championship. In 1957, he finished low amateur at the Transvaal Open for the fourth time.

As of 1958, he lived in Germiston, South Africa. In 1958, he was selected to represent South Africa in the Eisenhower Trophy. The event was held in October at St Andrews Golf Club in Scotland. South Africa's team finished in a tie for sixth among 29 teams.

In 1959, he played the South African Open. He finished at 282 (−14) and defeated Gary Player by a stroke. In November, he played the Commonwealth Tournament again. The event was played at Royal Johannesburg Golf Club. South Africa's team won the event.

== Professional career ==
As of March 1960, Hutchinson had turned professional. In 1960, Hutchinson played nine events on the PGA Tour, including the Masters and the U.S. Open. He missed the cut in the majors but made the cut in all of the rest of the tournaments. He recorded two top-25s, one of which was a top-10, a T-6 at the Oklahoma City Open Invitational. Late in the year, Hutchinson returned to South Africa. In December 1960, Hutchinson played a pairs exhibition match. He and Bobby Locke played against Gary Player and Harold Henning. His team lost 4 and 3. In early 1961 he won the South African Masters for the first time.

In 1962, Hutchinson had success across several continents. In January, he played the South African Open. Hutchinson finished at 286, in the runner-up slot, one behind Harold Henning. Shortly thereafter, Hutchinson successfully defended his South African Masters title. In April, he played in the 1962 Masters Tournament. He missed the cut. He also played the PGA Tour events that bookended the Masters, the Azalea Open Invitational and Greater Greensboro Open. He missed the cut at Greensboro and finished T-34 at the Azalea Open. He would not play on the PGA Tour again. In the northern hemisphere summer, he played in Europe. In June, he entered the Jeyes Tournament at Royal Dublin Country Club in Ireland. There were 22 professionals and 22 amateurs in the tournament. In the professional's section, Hutchinson began the two-round final day three shots behind favorite Christy O'Connor Snr. However, he shot a third round 68 to outplay O'Connor by two and get near the lead. During the final round, he shot an inward 34 against O'Connor's 36 to take the lead. The lead expanded as O'Connor scored 5 on the 14th and 15th holes. Hutchinson ultimately finished at 283 to outplay O'Connor by two and lead the professionals. Playing behind him, however, was amateur Paul Sheenan. The Irish amateur birdied the 15th and 16th holes to tie Hutchinson for the overall lead. At the last, he hit a "superb pitch" from 60 yards to assure birdie and a one shot win over Hutchinson. Hutchinson still won the professional's section, however. The prize money was the largest he had hitherto earned in any European tournament. In November, he played in the 1962 Canada Cup with Gary Player. The event was held in Buenos Aires, Argentina. His team was considered among the favorites. In the first round, however, Hutchinson shot a 73 and his team was quickly six shots behind the American team. Ultimately, South Africa finished in a tie for 12th among 34 teams, 33 shots behind the victorious American team.

In mid-1963, Hutchinson returned Europe. In April, he played the Cox Moore tournament at Wollaton Park in England. He shot a 69 (−1) to position himself in second place. He and fellow South African Harold Henning were the only players to break par. He shot over par in the second and third rounds but remained close to the lead. He played in the final group with Englishman Harry Weetman during the final round. Hutchinson shot a 33 on the front nine to get within one of the lead. He ultimately finished at 279 (−1), in a tie for third, three behind champion Brian Huggett. He earned 250 pounds for his efforts. In August, he played the Woodlawn International Invitational, a three-day, four-round event at an American air force base in Germany. He won the tournament, finishing at 271, defeating compatriot Retief Waltman by six shots. In December, Hutchinson played the Transvaal Open. He finished at 278, one behind champion Retief Waltman and one ahead of third-place finisher Gary Player.

In July 1964, he played the two-round Bowmaker Tournament in Sunningdale, England. He shot an opening round 73 to put him several shots behind. However, he shot a "spirited" final round 65 to finish in solo third place. He finished one behind Peter Alliss and two behind champion Neil Coles. In addition to the third place prize money, Hutchinson earned 180 pounds for the round of the day. In August, he attempted to defend his Woodlawn International Invitational championship. In the second round, he broke the course record with a 62. He was within one of Roberto De Vicenzo's lead. In the final round, he outplayed de Vicenzo by four to win. He finished at 272; de Vicenzo and Spain's Ángel Miguel finished two shots back. Late in the year Hutchinson was again selected to represent South Africa at the Canada Cup. He was teammates with Gary Player. The event was held in December at Royal Kaanapali Golf Course in Kaanapali, Hawaii. It was expected that South Africa would be among "the leading challengers." In the first round, both he and Player shot 69s and tied the American team of Arnold Palmer and Jack Nicklaus for the lead. In the second round, Hutchinson shot a 70 and Player a 69; they remained tied with the Americans. However, Hutchinson shot a third round 73 (+1). The South Africans were now nine behind the Americans with one round to go. The United States ultimately defeated South Africa by 14 strokes. Argentina's team, meanwhile, finished at 565 and narrowly defeated South Africa's team for second place.

In the mid-1960s, Hutchinson had success across South Africa and Europe. In February 1965, he played the South African Masters. He finished at 281 and won easily, defeating Cedric Amm by five shots. In September 1965, he had success at Rediffusion Tournament at La Moye Golf Club in Jersey. Hutchinson opened with three consecutive rounds in the 60s but was three shots behind joint leaders Guy Wolstenholme and Tony Coop entering the final round. In the final round, he came home with a 32 to record a 65 and overtake Peter Thomson for the clubhouse lead. However, Coop birdied the final hole to defeat Hutchinson by a shot and ultimately win. Hutchinson tied Bill Large for second and earned roughly 300 pounds for his efforts. In July 1966, Hutchinson played the French Open. He was the joint leader after the second round at 135 (−9). He shot a third round 71 (−1) to maintain the joint lead. In the final round he shot a 68 (−4) to finish at 274 (−14). Spanish professional Ramón Sota had a chance to enter a playoff with Hutchinson but missed a five-foot birdie putt on the last. Hutchinson won by one.

In the early 1970s, Hutchinson recorded his final highlights as a touring professional. In January 1970 he finished with rounds of 68 to win the South African PGA Championship by two strokes over Peter Oosterhuis. In March 1971, he played the Rhodesian Dunlop Masters. He shot a final round 70 to win the tournament by four shots over Simon Hobday.

In 1977, he played on the European Tour for the first time. He missed the cut in four of his five events. He never played on the European Tour again.

=== Senior career ===
In March 1992, Hutchinson turned 50. He played on the European Senior Tour part-time from 1992 to 1997. Hutchinson played in 31 events, making the cut 21 times, but did not record any top-10s. He finished 41st on the Order of Merit in 1993, the only time he finished in the top 50.

Since retiring from life as a touring professional, Hutchinson has maintained work in the golf industry. He has worked as a golf commentator for Sky Sports. He has been known as the "Voice of Golf" in South Africa. During this era, he was awarded Honorary Life President South African PGA.

In 2008, he was awarded by the PGA of South Africa as one of its first five "Master Professionals." The following year, he was inducted into the South African Hall of Fame. In 2010, he was recipient of the Master Class South African Golf Professional Award.

In 2017, Hutchinson contributed to a book, The Hole Truth and Other Mostly True Stories, with contemporary South African golfers Dale Hayes and Simon Hobday.

In January 2020, it was announced that a challenge match, the Denis Hutchinson Challenge Trophy, would be played at his home course, Royal Johannesburg & Kensington Golf Club. The event was in honor of Hutchinson's accomplishments as a golfer. The event would feature ten Sunshine Tour players and ten PGA of South Africa professionals verses 20 GolfRSA amateurs.

In March 2021, he earned life membership on the Sunshine Tour.

== Awards and honors ==
- In 2009, Hutchinson was inducted into the South African Hall of Fame.
- In 2010, he earned the Master Class South African Golf Professional Award.

== Professional wins (15) ==
=== South African wins (11) ===
- 1955 Natal Open (as an amateur)
- 1956 Southern Rhodesian Championship (as an amateur)
- 1959 South African Open Championship (as an amateur)
- 1961 Dunlop South African Masters
- 1962 Dunlop South African Masters, Cock o' the North
- 1963 Cock o' the North
- 1965 Dunlop South African Masters
- 1967 Western Province Open
- 1970 South African PGA Championship
- 1971 Rhodesian Dunlop Masters

=== European wins (4) ===
- 1962 Jeyes Tournament (Professional section)
- 1963 Woodlawn International
- 1964 Woodlawn International
- 1966 French Open

== Results in major championships ==
Tournament	1960	1961	1962	1963	1964	1965	1966	1967
Masters Tournament	CUT		CUT					
U.S. Open	CUT							
The Open Championship		T18	T16	T33	T34	T21	T27	T22

Note: Hutchinson never played in the PGA Championship.

Did not play

CUT = missed the half-way cut
"T" indicates a tie for a place

== Team appearances ==
Amateur

- Eisenhower Trophy (representing South Africa): 1958
- Commonwealth Tournament (representing South Africa): 1954, 1959 (winners)

Professional

- Canada Cup (representing South Africa): 1962, 1964
