= 1959 Ryder Cup =

Golf tournament in the United States

13th Ryder Cup Matches
- Dates: November 6–7, 1959
- Venue: Eldorado Country Club
- Location: Indian Wells, California
- Captains: Sam Snead (USA); Dai Rees (Great Britain)
(United States)	8 1/2	3 1/2	(United Kingdom)
- United States wins the Ryder Cup

Location map
- Location within California

The 13th Ryder Cup Matches were held November 6–7, 1959 at the Eldorado Country Club in Indian Wells, California. The United States team won the competition by a score of 8 1/2 to 3 1/2 points.

The British were again led by Dai Rees, but were unable to repeat the heroics of two years earlier and were comprehensively beaten on American soil. The Americans took a 2 1/2–1 1/2 lead in the foursomes before finishing off the British challenge in the singles by winning five matches with two matches finishing all square to win the cup back. The British won just one foursome match with Christy O'Connor and Peter Alliss beating Art Wall Jr. and Doug Ford by 3 & 2 and one singles match when Eric Brown beat Cary Middlecoff by 4 & 3 however by the time his match was won the United States had already won the competition.

== Format ==
The Ryder Cup is a match play event, with each match worth one point. Since the inaugural event in 1927, the format consisted of four foursome (alternate shot) matches on the first day and eight singles matches on the second day, for a total of 12 points. Therefore, 6 1/2 points were required to win the Cup, and all matches were played to a maximum of 36 holes. This was the last Ryder Cup played under this format.

== Teams ==
Team USA
Name	Age	Previous Ryder Cups	Matches	W–L–H	Winning percentage
Sam Snead – captain	47	6	11	9–2–0	81.82
Julius Boros	39	0	Rookie
Jack Burke Jr.	36	4	8	7–1–0	87.50
Dow Finsterwald	30	1	2	1–1–0	50.00
Doug Ford	37	2	4	3–1–0	75.00
Jay Hebert	36	0	Rookie
Cary Middlecoff	38	2	4	2–2–0	50.00
Bob Rosburg	33	0	Rookie
Mike Souchak	32	0	Rookie
Art Wall Jr.	35	1	1	0–1–0	0.00

Seven members of the British team were chosen using a Ryder Cup points system based on performances during the 1959 season. The first event was the PGA Close Championship starting on 8 April with the final event being the Irish Hospitals Tournament finishing on 12 July. The seven qualifiers were Hunt, Rees, Weetman, Mills, Alliss, Drew and O'Connor. The remaining three, Bousfield, Brown and Thomas, were selected by the P.G.A. tournament committee in late September, after the Dunlop Masters.

The British team sailed from Southampton on 15 October on the Queen Elizabeth. Mills had a back injury while the team was in Washington and was to be replaced by John Panton. However, he recovered enough to attend the event, although he was not chosen to play any matches; Hunt was also not in full health, suffering from bronchial trouble. The British team had a rough trip on a short flight from Los Angeles to Palm Springs and nearly all the players were ill, with some taking several days to recover.

Team Great Britain
Name	Age	Previous Ryder Cups	Matches	W–L–H	Winning percentage
(Wales) Dai Rees – captain	46	7	12	4–7–1	37.50
(England) Peter Alliss	28	2	4	0–4–0	0.00
(England) Ken Bousfield	40	4	4	3–1–0	75.00
(Scotland) Eric Brown	34	3	6	3–3–0	50.00
(Northern Ireland) Norman Drew	27	0	Rookie
(England) Bernard Hunt	29	2	4	1–2–1	37.50
(England) Peter Mills	28	1	1	1–0–0	100.00
(Republic of Ireland) Christy O'Connor Snr	34	2	3	1–2–0	33.33
(Wales) Dave Thomas	25	0	Rookie
(England) Harry Weetman	39	4	6	1–5–0	16.67

== Friday's foursome matches ==
Two matches went to the last hole. Boros and Finsterwald were 1 up against Rees and Bousfield playing the last. The match ended when the British pair put their second shot in the water and took 4 to reach the green. Weetman and Thomas were 1 up against Snead and Middlecoff at the last. Snead put his second in the water but rather than playing short, Weetman also put his second in the water. Middlecoff then chipped to 8 feet and Snead holed the putt to win the hole and halve the match. Weetman received some criticism for his decision not to lay-up.

	Results
Hunt/Brown	(United States) 5 & 4	Rosburg/Souchak
Rees/Bousfield	(United States) 2 up	Boros/Finsterwald
O'Connor/Alliss	(United Kingdom) 3 & 2	Wall/Ford
Weetman/Thomas	halved	Snead/Middlecoff
1 1/2	Session	2 1/2
1 1/2	Overall	2 1/2

18 hole scores: Rosburg/Souchak: 6 up, Boros/Finsterwald: 1 up, O'Connor/Alliss: 2 up, Snead/Middlecoff: 1 up.

== Saturday's singles matches ==
The Americans got off to a good start in many of the matches and had large leads in five of the matches at lunch. Eric Brown was the only British winner on the day.

	Results
Norman Drew	halved	Doug Ford
Ken Bousfield	(United States) 3 & 2	Mike Souchak
Harry Weetman	(United States) 6 & 5	Bob Rosburg
Dave Thomas	(United States) 6 & 5	Sam Snead
Christy O'Connor	(United States) 7 & 6	Art Wall Jr.
Dai Rees	(United States) 1 up	Dow Finsterwald
Peter Alliss	halved	Jay Hebert
Eric Brown	(United Kingdom) 4 & 3	Cary Middlecoff
2	Session	6
3 1/2	Overall	8 1/2

18 hole scores: Ford: 1 up, Souchak: 4 up, Rosburg: 4 up, Snead: 4 up, Wall: 5 up, Finsterwald: 5 up, Alliss: 1 up, Brown: 3 up.

== Individual player records ==
Each entry refers to the win–loss–half record of the player.

=== United States ===
Player	Points	Overall	Singles	Foursomes
Julius Boros	1	1–0–0	0–0–0	1–0–0
Dow Finsterwald	2	2–0–0	1–0–0	1–0–0
Doug Ford	0.5	0–1–1	0–0–1	0–1–0
Jay Hebert	0.5	0–0–1	0–0–1	0–0–0
Cary Middlecoff	0.5	0–1–1	0–1–0	0–0–1
Bob Rosburg	2	2–0–0	1–0–0	1–0–0
Sam Snead	1.5	1–0–1	1–0–0	0–0–1
Mike Souchak	2	2–0–0	1–0–0	1–0–0
Art Wall Jr.	1	1–1–0	1–0–0	0–1–0

Jack Burke Jr. did not play in any matches.

=== Great Britain ===
Player	Points	Overall	Singles	Foursomes
Peter Alliss	1.5	1–0–1	0–0–1	1–0–0
Ken Bousfield	0	0–2–0	0–1–0	0–1–0
Eric Brown	1	1–1–0	1–0–0	0–1–0
Norman Drew	0.5	0–0–1	0–0–1	0–0–0
Bernard Hunt	0	0–1–0	0–0–0	0–1–0
Christy O'Connor	1	1–1–0	0–1–0	1–0–0
Dai Rees	0	0–2–0	0–1–0	0–1–0
Dave Thomas	0.5	0–1–1	0–1–0	0–0–1
Harry Weetman	0.5	0–1–1	0–1–0	0–0–1

Peter Mills did not play in any matches.
