= Hedley Muscroft =

English professional golfer (1938–2023)

Personal information
- Full name: Hedley W. Muscroft
- Nationality: England
- Born: 3 April 1938 Leeds, Yorkshire, England
- Died: 12 March 2023 (aged 84) Marbella, Spain
- Height: 6 ft 1 in (1.85 m)

Career
- Sport: Golf
- Turned professional: 1954
- Former tours: European Tour; European Senior Tour
- Professional wins: 6

Best results in major championships
- Masters Tournament: DNP
- PGA Championship: DNP
- U.S. Open: DNP
- The Open Championship: T18: 1967

Hedley William Muscroft (3 April 1938 – 12 March 2023) was an English professional golfer. He played regularly on the European circuit and later on the European Tour when it started in 1972. He won the 1970 Classic International and played in The Open Championship 16 times with a best finish of 18th place in 1967.

== Golf career ==
Muscroft won one important tournament, the 1970 Classic International, where he beat Christy O'Connor Snr at the fourth hole of a sudden-death playoff and took the first prize of £1,000.

In 1964, he was a runner-up in the Swallow-Penfold Tournament behind Peter Alliss, and was also a runner-up in the Gor-Ray Cup, the assistants' championship. He was runner-up in the Bowmaker Tournament in 1965 and 1966 and in the 1966 Agfa-Gevaert Tournament. In 1968 he won the Evian International Open in France. Playing with Lionel Platts, he was runner-up in the inaugural Sumrie Better-Ball in 1969.

Muscroft played on the European Tour from its start in 1972. His best season was 1973. He was a joint runner-up in the Scandinavian Enterprise Open behind Bob Charles and was third in the Benson & Hedges Match Play Championship and the Dunlop Masters. Muscroft finished 13th in the 1973 Ryder Cup points table after a poor finish in the last qualifying event, the Benson & Hedges Festival of Golf, where he was 11-over-par for the last 27 holes. Having been a stroke behind the leader after 36 holes, he scored 43 for the last 9 holes of the third round and 76 in the final round to finish 16 strokes behind the winner. The leading 8 qualified automatically with 4 places chosen by a selection committee. The committee chose the players placed 9th to 12th in the table, selecting John Garner who had had a poor 1973 but had gained a lot of points in 1972. Garner was not chosen to play in any matches in the 1973 Ryder Cup.

In 1991 Muscroft finished tied for 7th place in the Seniors' British Open. He played on the European Senior Tour from its start in 1992 until 2000. His best finish to be tied for 5th place in the 1993 Northern Electric Seniors.

Muscroft was at Moor Allerton Golf Club before moving to the nearby Roundhay Park. Later he was at the Geneva Golf Club, Switzerland and later at Aloha Golf Club in Spain.

== Personal life and death ==
Muscroft's two sons, Duncan and Richard, were also professional golfers.

Duncan Muscroft was born in 1963. He won the 1980 Boys Amateur Championship at Formby, beating Aled Llyr in the final. He turned professional in 1982 and played two seasons on the European Tour, 1984 and 1997. He won the Northern PGA Championship in 1983. In 2006 he tied for the Glenmuir Club Professional Championship but lost to Paul Wesselingh at the first hole of a sudden-death playoff. This performance gained him a place in the 2007 PGA Cup team.

Richard Muscroft was born in 1965. He won the Berkshire Trophy in 1986, by two strokes from Ashley Brewer. Later in the year he played for the Great Britain and Ireland youth team in the EGA Trophy and for England in the Men's Home Internationals. He turned professional in 1989 and played on the Challenge Tour in 1999.

Muscroft died in Marbella, Spain on 12 March 2023, at the age of 84.

== Professional wins (6) ==
- 1962 Leeds Cup
- 1964 Northern Professional Championship
- 1968 Evian International Open
- 1970 Classic International, Leeds Cup
- 1982 Northern PGA Championship

== Results in major championships ==
Tournament	1960	1961	1962	1963	1964	1965	1966	1967	1968	1969
The Open Championship	CUT			T46	CUT	CUT	T43	T18	CUT	T28

Tournament	1970	1971	1972	1973	1974	1975	1976	1977	1978	1979
The Open Championship	CUT	CUT	CUT	CUT	CUT	CUT				

Tournament	1980	1981	1982	1983
The Open Championship			CUT	CUT

Note: Muscroft only played in The Open Championship.

Did not play

CUT = missed the half-way cut (3rd round cut in 1972 and 1973 Open Championships)
"T" indicates a tie for a place
