= Tony Grubb =

English golfer (1936–2017)

Personal information
- Full name: Antony Gawen Grubb
- Nationality: England
- Born: 22 July 1936 Yate, Gloucestershire, England
- Died: 6 June 2017 (aged 80) Herefordshire, England
- Height: 6 ft 0 in (1.83 m)
- Weight: 158 lb (72 kg; 11.3 st)

Career
- Sport: Golf
- Turned professional: 1954
- Former tours: European Tour; European Seniors Tour
- Professional wins: 4

Best results in major championships
- Masters Tournament: DNP
- PGA Championship: DNP
- U.S. Open: DNP
- The Open Championship: T39: 1963, 1968

Antony Gawen Grubb (22 July 1936 – 6 June 2017) was an English professional golfer. He is remembered for winning the 1964 Schweppes PGA Close Championship.

== Golf career ==
In 1958 Grubb won the Gor-Ray Cup, the Assistants' Championship, at Hartsbourne Golf Club. He scored 285 and finished two strokes ahead of Brian Huggett.

Grubb won the Schweppes PGA Close Championship at Western Gailes Golf Club in 1964 taking the first prize of £1,000. He was the only player under par and won by two strokes from Lionel Platts. The event was played in April and was the first important event of the season. Grubb benefited from having played in the United States during the early part of the year and also because, in 1964, the PGA experimented with using the bigger ball, as used in America.

Grubb played in the 6-man England team in the 1967 R.T.V. International Trophy, where he won 5 of his 6 matches and halved the other.

He tied with Brian Huggett for the 1969 36-hole pro-am Bowmaker Tournament at Sunningdale Golf Club. Later in the year he won the Southern Professional Championship at Crews Hill Golf Club, Enfield.

Grubb was runner-up in the 1966 Blaxnit (Ulster) Tournament and the 1968 Agfacolor Film Tournament.

Grubb played in the early years of the European Seniors Tour from its start in 1992. He was in the top-10 of the money list in 1992 and 1993. He never won an event on the tour but was a runner-up in the 1992 Forte PGA Seniors Championship behind Tommy Horton and in the 1995 London Masters behind John Bland. In the 1992 Seniors Championship was involved in a playoff with Horton and Christy O'Connor Snr. Grubb hit his second shot out of bounds and Horton took the title with a long birdie putt.

== Deaths ==
Grubb died in Herefordshire on 6 June 2017.

== Tournament wins (4) ==
- 1958 Gor-Ray Cup
- 1964 Schweppes PGA Close Championship
- 1969 Bowmaker Tournament (tie with Brian Huggett), Southern Professional Championship

== Playoff record ==
European Senior Tour playoff record (0–1)

No.	Year	Tournament	Opponents	Result
1	1992	Forte PGA Seniors Championship	(England) Tommy Horton, (Republic of Ireland) Christy O'Connor Snr	Horton won with birdie on first extra hole

== Results in major championships ==
Tournament	1963	1964	1965	1966	1967	1968	1969	1970	1971	1972	1973	1974	1975	1976
The Open Championship	T39	CUT	CUT	59		T39	CUT	T41			CUT	CUT		CUT

Note: Grubb only played in The Open Championship.

Did not play

CUT = missed the half-way cut (3rd round cut in 1969, 1973 and 1974 Open Championships)
"T" indicates a tie for a place

== Team appearances ==
- R.T.V. International Trophy (representing England): 1967 (winners)
