= Tom Haliburton =

Scottish golfer

Personal information
- Full name: Thomas Bruce Haliburton
- Nationality: Scotland
- Born: 5 June 1915 Rhu, Argyll and Bute, Scotland
- Died: 25 October 1975 (aged 60) Virginia Water, Surrey, England

Career
- Sport: Golf
- Status: Professional
- Professional wins: 12

Best results in major championships
- Masters Tournament: CUT: 1962
- PGA Championship: DNP
- U.S. Open: DNP
- The Open Championship: T5: 1957

Thomas Bruce Haliburton (5 June 1915 – 25 October 1975) was a Scottish golfer. He finished tied for 5th in the 1957 Open Championship and played in the 1961 and 1963 Ryder Cups.

== Early life ==
Haliburton was born in a cottage in Rhu, then in Dunbartonshire but now in Argyll and Bute, but after a few years his parents moved to Shandon, a few miles away. It was there that he had his first contact with golf at Shandon Golf Club. He went to the Hermitage School in Helensburgh until he was 15 years old.

During World War II, Haliburton was in the Royal Air Force. He married in 1941 and became a corporal in the same year.

== Golf career ==
Haliburton was initially an assistant for two years at Haggs Castle Golf Club in Glasgow where he was appointed professional in December 1934 before moving to Prestwick St Nicholas Golf Club as professional in January 1937. In 1939, he became first assistant to Henry Cotton at Ashridge Golf Club. After a series of moves, he became the professional at the Wentworth Club in 1952 where he remained until his death in 1975.

In 1952 he set a world record score by scoring 126 for the first two rounds of the Spalding Tournament, although he eventually finished fourth.

He was in the British 1961 and 1963 Ryder Cup teams.

In the 1963 Open Championship at Royal Lytham, he scored 29 for the first nine holes of the opening round, an Open record, equalled by Peter Thomson later on the same day. Tony Jacklin equalled the record in 1970 and Denis Durnian beat it, scoring 28, in 1983.

In 1969 he became chairman of the British PGA. He was the non-playing British captain in the first PGA Cup at Pinehurst, North Carolina in 1973. His last tournament was a Pro-Am at Helensburgh Golf Club in 1974.

== Death ==
Drawing up plan for his retirement, he had recommended Bernard Gallacher as his successor at Wentworth. Haliburton and Gallacher had just started a practice round when, on the first green, Haliburton collapsed and died. He had been a professional golfer for 42 years.

== Tournament wins ==
- 1938 Northern Open, West of Scotland Championship, Ayrshire Professional Championship
- 1946 West of England Professional Championship
- 1949 Daily Mail Tournament
- 1951 Sunningdale Foursomes (with Jean Donald), Middlesex Professional Championship
- 1953 Sunningdale Foursomes (with Jean Donald)
- 1957 Surrey Open
- 1959 Gleneagles Hotel Foursomes Tournament (with Bill Igoe)
- 1963 Yorkshire Evening News Tournament, Surrey Open

== Results in major championships ==
Tournament	1936	1937	1938	1939
Masters Tournament				
The Open Championship	CUT		35	

Tournament	1940	1941	1942	1943	1944	1945	1946	1947	1948	1949
Masters Tournament				NT	NT	NT				
The Open Championship	NT	NT	NT	NT	NT	NT	T31	CUT	T23	

Tournament	1950	1951	1952	1953	1954	1955	1956	1957	1958	1959
Masters Tournament										
The Open Championship	WD	CUT	T37	T29	CUT	T32	CUT	T5	CUT	T29

Tournament	1960	1961	1962	1963	1964
Masters Tournament			CUT		
The Open Championship	T32	T41	CUT	T30	CUT

Note: Haliburton only played in the Masters Tournament and The Open Championship.

Top 10
Did not play

NT = No tournament
CUT = missed the half-way cut
WD = Withdrew
"T" indicates a tie for a place

== Team appearances ==
- Canada Cup (representing Scotland): 1954
- Ryder Cup (representing Great Britain): 1961, 1963
- Ireland–Scotland Professional Match (representing Scotland): 1935, 1936
- England–Scotland Professional Match (representing Scotland): 1938
- Llandudno International Golf Trophy (representing Scotland): 1938
- Amateurs–Professionals Match (representing the Professionals): 1960 (winners)
- PGA Cup (representing Great Britain and Ireland): 1973 (non-playing captain)
