= Bernard Hunt =

English professional golfer (1930–2013)

Bernard Hunt MBE
Personal information
- Full name: Bernard John Hunt
- Nationality: England
- Born: 2 February 1930 Atherstone, Warwickshire, England
- Died: 21 June 2013 (aged 83)
- Height: 6 ft 2 in (1.88 m)

Career
- Sport: Golf
- Turned professional: 1946
- Former tours: European Tour; European Seniors Tour
- Professional wins: 31

Best results in major championships
- Masters Tournament: T26: 1965
- PGA Championship: DNP
- U.S. Open: DNP
- The Open Championship: T3: 1960

Achievements and awards
- Harry Vardon Trophy: 1958, 1960, 1965

Bernard John Hunt, MBE (2 February 1930 – 21 June 2013) was an English professional golfer.

== Career ==
In 1930, Hunt was born in Atherstone, Warwickshire, England.

In 1946, he turned professional. He was a leading player on the European circuit in the 1950s and 1960s. He topped the Order of Merit, which was then points-based, in 1958, 1960 and 1965. The best season of his regular career in prize money terms was 1963, when he won £7,209. He was past his peak by the time the formal European Tour was introduced in 1972, but finished in the top twenty on the money list in 1973. He played on the European Seniors Tour in for its first seven seasons (1992–1998) but his opportunity to make an impact at this level was limited as he was sixty-two by the time the tour was founded. His best season was 1994, when he came fifteenth on the Order of Merit and earned £15,361.

Between 1953 and 1969 Hunt represented Great Britain in the Ryder Cup eight times out of nine. His overall win–loss–half record was 6–16–6, but his record in singles was much better at 4–3–3. In 1963 his younger brother Geoff was also in the team. He was the non-playing captain of the Great Britain & Ireland teams of 1973 and 1975, both of which were defeated by the United States.

One of the courses at Foxhills Golf Club located in Ottershaw, Surrey, is named after Hunt, where he served as head professional for 25 years in the 1980s and 1990s.

== Personal life ==
Hunt died in June 2013 at the age of 83.

== Professional wins (31) ==
This list may be incomplete

- 1952 Coombe Hill Assistants' Tournament
- 1953 Gor-Ray Cup, Spalding Tournament, Coombe Hill Assistants' Tournament, Goodwin (Sheffield) Foursomes Tournament (with Jack Hargreaves), Gleneagles-Saxone Foursomes Tournament (with Stewart Ross)
- 1954 Goodwin (Sheffield) Foursomes Tournament (with Sid Collins Jr.)
- 1956 Egyptian Open
- 1957 Spalding Tournament, Belgian Open
- 1958 Irish Hospitals Tournament (tied with Frank Jowle), Bowmaker Tournament (tied with Peter Mills), Professional Short Course Championship
- 1959 Southern Professional Championship
- 1960 Pickering Tournament (with Geoffrey Hunt), Southern Professional Championship
- 1961 German Open, Daks Tournament, Martini International, Woodlawn Tournament
- 1962 Brazil Open, Smart Weston Southern Professional Championship
- 1963 British Masters, Smart Weston Tournament, Swallow-Penfold Tournament, Gevacolor Tournament, Carroll Sweet Afton Tournament
- 1964 Rediffusion Tournament
- 1965 Gallaher Ulster Open, British Masters
- 1966 Piccadilly Tournament
- 1967 French Open, Gallaher Ulster Open
- 1968 Basildon Tournament
- 1969 Algarve Open, Italian BP Open
- 1970 Agfa-Gevaert Tournament, Sumrie Better-Ball (with Neil Coles), Penfold Tournament
- 1971 W.D. & H.O. Wills Tournament
- 1973 Grand Bahama Open, Sumrie Better-Ball (with Neil Coles)

== Playoff record ==
European Seniors Tour playoff record (0–1)

No.	Year	Tournament	Opponent	Result
1	1994	Northern Electric Seniors	(England) John Morgan	Lost to birdie on sixth extra hole

== Results in major championships ==
Tournament	1952	1953	1954	1955	1956	1957	1958	1959
Masters Tournament								
The Open Championship	46	T34	CUT	T5	T31	T24	T30	T11

Tournament	1960	1961	1962	1963	1964	1965	1966	1967	1968	1969
Masters Tournament						T26	CUT			
The Open Championship	T3	CUT	T16	T11	4	T5	CUT	T36	CUT	T23

Tournament	1970	1971	1972	1973	1974
Masters Tournament					
The Open Championship	CUT	T20	CUT	T49	T42

Note: Hunt only played in the Masters Tournament and The Open Championship.

Top 10
Did not play

CUT = missed the half-way cut (3rd round cut in 1970 and 1972 Open Championships)
"T" indicates a tie for a place

=== Summary ===
Tournament	Wins	2nd	3rd	Top-5	Top-10	Top-25	Events	Cuts made
Masters Tournament	0	0	0	0	0	0	2	1
U.S. Open	0	0	0	0	0	0	0	0
The Open Championship	0	0	1	4	4	10	23	17
PGA Championship	0	0	0	0	0	0	0	0
Totals	0	0	1	4	4	10	25	18

- Most consecutive cuts made – 6 (1955 Open Championship – 1960 Open Championship)
- Longest streak of top-10s – 1 (four times)

== Team appearances ==
- Ryder Cup (representing Great Britain): 1953, 1957 (winners), 1959, 1961, 1963, 1965, 1967, 1969 (tie)
- World Cup (representing England): 1958, 1959, 1960, 1962, 1963, 1964, 1968
- Joy Cup (representing the British Isles): 1958 (winners)
- Amateurs–Professionals Match (representing the Professionals): 1957 (winners), 1958, 1959 (winners), 1960 (winners)
- Double Diamond International (representing England): 1971 (winners, captain), 1972 (winners, captain), 1973 (captain)
