= Fred Boobyer =

English golfer

Personal information
- Full name: Frederick Sackville Boobyer
- Nationality: England
- Born: 28 January 1928 Failand, Somerset, England
- Died: 24 March 2009 (aged 81) Bristol, England

Career
- Sport: Golf
- Status: Professional
- Former tour: European Tour
- Professional wins: 4

Best results in major championships
- Masters Tournament: DNP
- PGA Championship: DNP
- U.S. Open: DNP
- The Open Championship: T25: 1965, 1969

Frederick Sackville Boobyer (28 January 1928 – 24 March 2009) was an English professional golfer who played on the British circuit in the 1960s. Although he never won an important 72-hole tournament, he was good enough to be selected for the Professionals against the Amateurs in 1960 and for the 6-man England team in the 1967 R.T.V. International Trophy, where he won 5 of his 6 matches and halved the other.

He won the 1966 36-hole pro-am Bowmaker Tournament at Sunningdale Golf Club, scoring 30 for the last 9 holes. He collected £350 for the win plus a further £50 for his second round 64 and another £250 for winning the pro-am where he was partnered by Bruce Forsyth.

In the 1981 PGA Seniors Championship at North Berwick Golf Club, he lost in a playoff to Christy O'Connor Snr, taking 5 to Christy's 4 at the first playoff hole.

His father Fred and brother Bob were also professional golfers.

== Tournament wins ==
- 1964 West of England Professional Championship
- 1966 Bowmaker Tournament
- 1967 Woodlawn International Invitational
- 1974 West of England Professional Championship

== Results in major championships ==
Tournament	1953	1954	1955	1956	1957	1958	1959
The Open Championship	CUT					CUT	CUT

Tournament	1960	1961	1962	1963	1964	1965	1966	1967	1968	1969	1970
The Open Championship	T28	T44		T36		T25	T30	T29	CUT	T25	CUT

Note: Boobyer only played in The Open Championship.

Did not play

CUT = missed the half-way cut (3rd round cut in 1968 and 1970 Open Championships)
"T" indicates a tie for a place

== Team appearances ==
- Amateurs–Professionals Match (representing the Professionals): 1960 (winners)
- R.T.V. International Trophy (representing England): 1967 (winners)
