= George Will (golfer) =

Scottish golfer

Personal information
- Full name: George Duncan Will
- Nationality: Scotland
- Born: 16 April 1937 Ladybank, Fife, Scotland
- Died: 4 December 2010 (aged 73) Shipbourne, Kent, England
- Spouses: Euphemia (1963–1973); Jeanie
- Children: 4

Career
- Sport: Golf
- Turned professional: 1957
- Former tours: European Tour; European Senior Tour
- Professional wins: 19

Best results in major championships
- Masters Tournament: CUT: 1966
- PGA Championship: DNP
- U.S. Open: DNP
- The Open Championship: T21: 1965

George Duncan Will (16 April 1937 – 4 December 2010) was a Scottish professional golfer.

A consistent tournament player around the world with a fine swing, George Will played in the 1963, 1965 and 1967 Ryder Cup's. He was one of the select number of golfers chosen to play in the televised Shell's Wonderful World of Golf series, defeating reigning USPGA champion Dave Marr at Turnberry in 1966.

After his playing days, he became a teacher which included a spell as Belgian National Coach in the early 1990s. He is the author of Golf The Modern Way (1968)

== Amateur wins ==
- 1955 Scottish Boys' Championship
- 1957 British Youths Open Championship, Gleneagles-Saxone Foursomes Tournament (with Eric Brown)

== Professional wins ==
- 1958 Northern Open
- 1963 Gor-Ray Cup, Northern Open
- 1964 Smart Weston Tournament
- 1965 Esso Golden Tournament
- 1967 Basildon Tournament
- 1970 Skol Tournament
- 1979 Sunningdale Foursomes (with Roger Chapman)

Others:

- Kent Professional Championship (6): 1972, 1975, 1976 (plus 3 others)
- Kent Open (5): 1968, 1969, 1972, 1975, 1985
- Army Champion (2): 1959, 1960

== Playoff record ==
Far East Circuit playoff record (0–1)

No.	Year	Tournament	Opponents	Result
1	1966	Singapore Open	(Taiwan) Lu Liang-Huan, (New Zealand) Ross Newdick	Newdick won with birdie on second extra hole

== Results in major championships ==
Tournament	1957	1958	1959	1960	1961	1962	1963	1964	1965	1966	1967	1968	1969	1970	1971
Masters Tournament										CUT					
The Open Championship	CUT			CUT	T29	CUT	CUT	29	T21	T23	CUT	CUT	CUT	T45	CUT

Note: Will only played in the Masters Tournament and The Open Championship.

Did not play

CUT = missed the half-way cut
"T" indicates a tie for a place

== Team appearances ==
- Ryder Cup (representing Great Britain): 1963, 1965, 1967
- World Cup (representing Scotland): 1963, 1969, 1970
- R.T.V. International Trophy (representing Scotland): 1967
- PGA Cup (representing Great Britain and Ireland): 1976 (non-playing captain)
