= Dave Thomas (golfer) =

Welsh professional golfer (1934–2013)

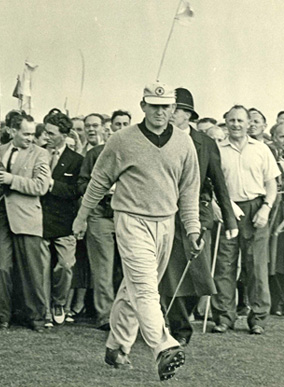

Personal information
- Full name: David Charles Thomas
- Nationality: Wales
- Born: 16 August 1934 Newcastle, England
- Died: 27 August 2013 (aged 79) Spain

Career
- Sport: Golf
- Turned professional: 1949
- Former tour: European Tour
- Professional wins: 18

Best results in major championships
- Masters Tournament: T30: 1959
- PGA Championship: DNP
- U.S. Open: CUT: 1964
- The Open Championship: 2nd/T2: 1958, 1966

David Charles Thomas (16 August 1934 – 27 August 2013) was a Welsh professional golfer and renowned golf course architect.

Thomas was one of Britain's leading golfers during the 1950s and 1960s with many tournament victories around Europe, including the News of the World Match Play and the Belgian, Dutch and French Open championships. He was runner-up at The Open Championship in 1958 and 1966.

== Career ==
Thomas was born in Newcastle upon Tyne, England.

Thomas turned professional in 1949, taking up a position as an assistant. He later played tournament golf, and won more than a dozen titles in Britain and around Europe. He also tried his hand in the United States with less success, although he did win a qualifying tournament for the U.S. Open in 1964 and finished second in the St. Paul Open.

In 1958, Thomas finished tied with Peter Thomson after 72 holes in the Open at Royal Lytham, but lost the 36-hole Saturday playoff by four strokes. At Muirfield in 1966, he again finished as runner-up, one stroke behind Jack Nicklaus. Throughout his career, Thomas was renowned for his long, straight, driving, and once hit a drive during a practice round for the 1967 Open at Hoylake onto the green at the 420-yard (384 m) second hole.

Thomas represented Great Britain in the Ryder Cup on four occasions, in 1959, 1963, 1965 and 1967, only being defeated once in his five singles matches. He also represented Wales in the Canada Cup, which later became the World Cup of Golf, on eleven occasions, and again at the Double Diamond Internationals in 1972.

Thomas was elected Captain of the Professional Golfers' Association during their centenary year in 2001, and in 2006 was recognised for his contribution to golf by being made an honorary life member of the PGA.

After retiring from tournament golf due to back and eye problems, Thomas set up a golf course design business. He designed over 100 courses around the world, and his work includes the Brabazon, Derby and PGA National courses at Ryder Cup venue The Belfry.

== Death ==
Thomas lived his last few years in Marbella, Spain where he died at his home on 27 August 2013.

== Professional wins ==
This list may be incomplete.

- 1955 Gor-Ray Cup, Belgian Open
- 1957 Caltex Tournament
- 1958 Dutch Open, Caltex Tournament
- 1959 French Open
- 1961 Esso Golden Tournament (tie with Peter Thomson)
- 1962 Esso Golden Tournament
- 1963 News of the World Match Play, Olgiata Trophy (Rome)
- 1965 Silentnight Tournament (tie with Jimmy Martin)
- 1966 Esso Golden Tournament, Swallow-Penfold Tournament, Jeyes Tournament
- 1968 Penfold Tournament
- 1969 Graham Textiles Champion, Pains Wessex Champion

== Playoff record ==
PGA Tour playoff record (0–1)

No.	Year	Tournament	Opponent	Result
1	1958	The Open Championship	(Australia) Peter Thomson	Lost 36-hole playoff; Thomson: −3 (68-71=139), Thomas: +1 (69-74=143)

== Results in major championships ==
Tournament	1955	1956	1957	1958	1959
Masters Tournament					T30
U.S. Open					
The Open Championship	CUT	T17	T5	2	

Tournament	1960	1961	1962	1963	1964	1965	1966	1967	1968	1969
Masters Tournament					CUT		CUT	T46		
U.S. Open					CUT					
The Open Championship		T20	T8	T26	T13	39	T2	CUT	T27	CUT

Tournament	1970	1971	1972
Masters Tournament			
U.S. Open			
The Open Championship	T32		CUT

Note: Thomas never played in the PGA Championship.

Top 10
Did not play

CUT = missed the half-way cut (3rd round cut in 1969 Open Championship)
"T" indicates a tie for a place

=== Summary ===
Tournament	Wins	2nd	3rd	Top-5	Top-10	Top-25	Events	Cuts made
Masters Tournament	0	0	0	0	0	0	4	2
U.S. Open	0	0	0	0	0	0	1	0
The Open Championship	0	2	0	3	4	7	15	11
PGA Championship	0	0	0	0	0	0	0	0
Totals	0	2	0	3	4	7	20	13

- Most consecutive cuts made – 7 (1956 Open Championship – 1963 Open Championship)
- Longest streak of top-10s – 2 (1957 Open Championship – 1958 Open Championship)

== Team appearances ==
- Ryder Cup (representing Great Britain): 1959, 1963, 1965, 1967
- World Cup (representing Wales): 1957, 1958, 1959, 1960, 1961, 1962, 1963, 1966, 1967, 1969, 1970
- R.T.V. International Trophy (representing Wales): 1967
- Double Diamond International (representing Wales): 1972, 1973
