= Stuart C. Goodwin Tournament =

Tournament information
- Location: Thrybergh, Yorkshire, England
- Established: 1956
- Course(s): Rotherham Golf Club
- Month played: August/September
- Final year: 1956

Final champion
- Eric Brown and John Fallon (tie)

Location in England

The Stuart C. Goodwin Tournament was a professional golf tournament played in Thrybergh, Yorkshire, England. The event was held just once, from 30 August to 1 September 1956, and had total prize money of £5,250. The event was sponsored by Sir Stuart Goodwin, a Yorkshire steel industrialist. Goodwin had sponsored the Goodwin (Sheffield) Foursomes Tournament from 1952 to 1954 and later donated £10,000 to support the 1957 Ryder Cup.

The £5,250 was the largest ever for a British golf event, surpassing the £3,750 at the 1956 Open Championship. 80 players qualified through regional qualifying. The final stage was unusual, consisting of three rounds of match-play and then 36 holes of stroke-play for the remaining 10 players on the final day. A feature of the prize money distribution was that it was spread more evenly than other tournaments at the time. The 40 who lost in the first round each received £40 with £60 for the 20 second round losers and £80 for the 10 who lost in the third round. The final ten received prizes ranging from £500 to £100.

== Winners ==
Year	Winners	Country	Venue	Score	Margin of victory	Runner-up	Winner's share (£)	Ref
1956	Eric Brown; John Fallon	Scotland; Scotland	Rotherham Golf Club	142	Tie		Shared 500 and 200	
