= Frank Jowle =

English golfer

Personal information
- Full name: Frank Jowle
- Nationality: England
- Born: 14 May 1912 Wortley, Yorkshire, England
- Died: 13 May 1996 (aged 83) Bromsgrove, Worcestershire, England

Career
- Sport: Golf
- Turned professional: 1931
- Professional wins: 4

Best results in major championships
- Masters Tournament: DNP
- PGA Championship: DNP
- U.S. Open: DNP
- The Open Championship: 3rd: 1955

Frank Jowle (14 May 1912 – 13 May 1996) was an English professional golfer. His best season was 1958 when he won the Spalding Tournament and was joint winner of the Irish Hospitals Tournament in the space of a month. He finished third in the 1955 Open Championship.

== Golfing career ==
Jowle won the 1935 Leeds Cup at Moor Allerton Golf Club after a playoff against John Fallon, scoring 72 to Fallon's 73 in the playoff. The event was also the northern section qualifying competition for the News of the World Matchplay. Soon afterwards he finished tied for 4th place in the Daily Mirror Assistants' Tournament at St Annes Old Links. He broke the course record with a final round of 66, coming home in 31.

Jowle reached the final of the News of the World Matchplay in 1950 at Carnoustie but lost to Dai Rees 7&6. Rees was 2 up after 21 holes but then won 5 of the next 6 holes to be 7 up after 27 holes. He was a losing semi-finalist in this tournament in 1954 and 1955.

He was joint winner of the 1957 Bowmaker Tournament at the Berkshire Golf Club, tying with Bobby Locke on 135 for the 36 holes and winning £400.

In April 1958, Jowle won the Spalding Tournament at Moor Park Golf Club with a score of 277, 2 strokes ahead of Harold Henning and Arthur Lees. He won the first prize of £300. In May, he was joint winner of the Irish Hospitals Tournament at Woodbrook Golf Club, tying with Bernard Hunt on 277. They shared the first and second prizes, taking home £750 each.

== Tournament wins ==
this list may be incomplete

- 1935 Leeds Cup
- 1957 Bowmaker Tournament (tie with Bobby Locke)
- 1958 Spalding Tournament, Irish Hospitals Tournament (tie with Bernard Hunt)

== Results in major championships ==
Tournament	1946	1947	1948	1949	1950	1951	1952	1953	1954	1955	1956	1957	1958	1959	1960	1961
The Open Championship	T18	T32	T18	CUT			CUT		T47	3			CUT	CUT		CUT

Note: Jowle only played in The Open Championship.

Top 10
Did not play

CUT = missed the half-way cut
"T" indicates a tie for a place
