= Midland Professional Foursomes =

Tournament information
- Location: English Midlands
- Established: 1907
- Format: Initially Match-play; Stroke-play from 1925
- Final year: 1939

The Midland Professional Foursomes was an annual professional foursomes golf tournament played in the English Midlands. The event ran from 1907 to 1939. Initially, it was a match-play event but from 1925, it became a 36-hole stroke-play tournament. Martini sponsored a similar event from 1956 to 1960, while other events were held in 1963 and 1965.

== History ==
The first tournament was arranged in early 1907, following the initial interest in the London Professional Foursomes. Entries were open to members of the Midland section of the PGA. 11 entries were received, but didn't include Tom Williamson or James Sherlock. The format closely followed that of the London Professional Foursomes. The tournament was match-play. In the early rounds the first named couple in the draw had the choice of course. Each round had to be completed by a specific date with the final to be completed by the end of February 1907. Matches were over 36 holes with a sudden-death playoff in the event of a tie. The semi-finals were played on 12 March at Handsworth and Derby with the final on 20 March at Harborne. The semi-finals and final were all one-sided matches, George Coburn and Alfred Lewis winning the final 5&3. The 1908 event followed a similar format, although were only 9 entries. Coburn and Alfred Lewis repeated their success of 1907, winning the final 7&5.

The format was revised in 1909 with the tournament played over two days, matches being over 18 holes. 13 pairs entered so that two rounds were played each day. Tom Williamson entered for the first time playing with brother Hugh. However they lost in the quarter-finals to the eventual winners, George Coburn and Billy Whiting. The final was a close match, with Coburn and Whiting winning at the 19th hole. The 1910 event followed a similar format, 16 pairs entering. The Williamson brother were beaten as the same and Coburn and Billy Whiting repeated their success of 1909. Coburn and Billy Whiting reached final again in 1911 but were beaten in a close match by Jack Bloxham and William Hamlet. With 21 entries in 1912 the tournament was extended to a third day. Walter Tedder and Tom Williamson beat the defending champions 2&1 in the 18-hole final. In 1913 the final was extended to 36 holes and was won by Len Holland and George Tuck. There was a significant change in 1914, with the pairings drawn by lot. There were a record 22 pairs with Tuck against successful, this time in partnership with Arthur Ham.

The event returned in 1920, players choosing their own pairings. Dunlop presented a pair of challenge cups which were held by the winners for a year. There were 14 entries but with a 36-hole final the event still extended to three days. Len Holland and George Tuck, the 1913 winners, won again, beating George Cawsey and Arthur Ham at the 37th hole. The final was reduced to 18 holes in 1921, meaning the event could be reduced to two days. Holland and Tuck retained the title at the 20th hole on the final, Tuck's fourth successive win in the event. Holland and Tuck were beaten in the 1922 semi-finals at the 19th hole by Harry Cawsey and Tom Williamson, won went on to win the title. 22 couples played in 1923, extending the event to three days. Michael Bingham & W. G. Saunders won a one-sided final 6&4. There were 16 pairs in 1924, Bingham and Saunders retaining the title in a close final, winning at the 19th hole.

There was a major change in format from 1925 with the event changing from match-play to stroke-play. It was contested over 36 holes in a single day. In 1925 the pairings were drawn, as in 1914. Michael Bingham won the third year in a row, this time partnered with Stanley Godfrey. From 1926 players again chose their own pairings, Jack Bloxham and Tom Richards winning the tournament. There was a tie in 1927, George Buckle and George Tuck beating Tom Barber and Ted Douglas by one stroke in the 9-hole evening playoff.

In 1928 the event was opened up to all PGA members but was won by the Midland pair of Archie Compston and Dick Wheildon. There was a four-way tie in 1929. The four pairs played an extra nine holes in the evening, which eliminated two of the pairs, but two of the pairs were still tied. Those two pairs returned the following day but were still tied after an 18-hole playoff. It was only after a further 9-hole playoff that Tom Barber and Michael Bingham were eventually successful. The 1930 tournament was not held in Midlands but at Gerrards Cross. Henry Cotton and his brother Leslie won, finishing a stroke ahead of two of the Whitcombe brothers, Charles and Ernest. The event had always been played very early in the year, mostly in February or March but from 1931 it was played in October. William Button and Jack Stait won in 1931, followed by Bert Gadd and Charlie Ward in 1932 and George Oke & Charles Whitcombe in 1933.

The event was not held from 1934 to 1937 but was revived in July 1938. Bill Firkins and Algy Holton won that year with Bill Branch and George Johnson winning the 1939 tournament, held in May. The event was not restarted after World War II.

=== Martini Midland Professional Foursomes ===
A Martini sponsored event was played from 1956 to 1960. The event was a 36-hole stroke-play event, played in a single day. Players entered individually with the pairings randomly drawn. Total prize money was £300 in 1956, rising to £500 in 1957. David Snell and Charlie Ward won in 1956, with Bill Firkins and Ralph Moffitt winning in 1957 followed by Frank Miller and Moffitt in 1958. Martini also sponsored a Southern event from 1957 and a Northern event in 1958. In 1959 four events were run, extended to cover all the PGA sections. The Midland event also included the Welsh and East Anglian sections. Bill Firkins and Malcolm Hill won the event. In 1960 the four regional tournaments also acted as qualifying event for a national event which was held at The Berkshire club in late August. Bryon Hutchinson and John Wiggett won the Midland event, players in the leading 12 pairs qualifying for the national event.

=== Stuart C. Goodwin Midland Professional Foursomes ===
In 1963 Stuart Goodwin sponsored an event with prize money of £735, the winners receiving £100 each. It was held at Sherwood Forest Golf Club from 30 April to 2 May. Goodwin had sponsored a national event, the Sherwood Forest Foursomes Tournament, on the same course in 1959. There was an 18-hole individual stroke-play qualification stage on the first day, after which the leading 32 players were drawn into 16 foursomes pairings. There were then four rounds of match-play on the following two days. The event was won by George Bell and Horace Lester.

=== Bass, Mitchells & Butlers Midland Professional Foursomes ===
In 1965 Bass, Mitchells & Butlers sponsored an event with prize money of £1,000, the winners receiving £150 each. The event was a 36-hole stroke-play event, played over two days. Players chose their own pairings. It was originally planned to be played at Little Aston Golf Club from 7 and 8 September. However, the second day was abandoned because of rain and the second round was eventually played on 27 October. The event was won by David Astill & David Talbot, one of the leading pairs after the first day.

== Winners ==
Year	Winners	Score	Margin of victory	Runners-up	Venue	Ref
Midland Professional Foursomes
1907	George Coburn & Alfred Lewis	5 & 3		George Cawsey & Willie Lewis	Harborne (final)	
1908	George Coburn & Alfred Lewis	7 & 5		Jack Fulford & Jack Oke	Kings Norton (final)	
1909	George Coburn & Billy Whiting	19 holes		Alfred Lewis & Jack Oke	Sandwell Park	
1910	George Coburn & Billy Whiting	4 & 3		Charles Richards & Edward Veness	Harborne	
1911	Jack Bloxham & William Hamlet	1 up		George Coburn & Billy Whiting	Olton	
1912	Walter Tedder & Tom Williamson	2 & 1		Jack Bloxham & William Hamlet	Handsworth	
1913	Len Holland & George Tuck	4 & 3		John Hutchings & William Hutchings	Castle Bromwich	
1914	Arthur Ham & George Tuck	4 & 3		George Buckle & Vivian Richards	Stourbridge	
1915–1919: No tournament
1920	Len Holland & George Tuck	37 holes		George Cawsey & Arthur Ham	Little Aston	
1921	Len Holland & George Tuck	20 holes		George Buckle & Dick Wheildon	Northamptonshire County	
1922	Harry Cawsey & Tom Williamson	2 & 1		George Buckle & Dick Wheildon	Rushcliffe	
1923	Michael Bingham & W. G. Saunders	6 & 4		Alfred Lewis & Martin Lewis	Walmley	
1924	Michael Bingham & W. G. Saunders	19 holes		Ted Douglas & Alfred Matthews	Blackwell	
1925	Michael Bingham & Stanley Godfrey	134	4 strokes	George Buckle & F Nicholls; Ted Douglas & Alfred Lewis	North Worcestershire	
1926	Jack Bloxham & Tom Richards	150	1 stroke	Tom Barber & Ted Douglas	Willesley Park	
1927	George Buckle & George Tuck	152	Playoff (Note: Buckle and Tuck won a 9-hole playoff, played the same evening.)	Tom Barber & Ted Douglas	Blackwell	
1928	Archie Compston & Dick Wheildon	151	2 strokes	Tom Barber & Frank Dennis; Keith Dalby & Stewart Field; Charles Johns & Herbert Jolly; Arthur Lacey & Bill Moore	Northamptonshire County	
1929	Tom Barber & Michael Bingham	153	Playoff	Jock Ballantine & Jack Hooker; Bill Firkins & Algy Holton; Len Holland & Dick Wheildon	Hollinwell	
1930	Henry Cotton & Leslie Cotton	143	1 stroke	Charles Whitcombe & Ernest Whitcombe	Gerrards Cross	
1931	William Button & Jack Stait	142	2 strokes	Bill Firkins & Algy Holton	Copt Heath	
1932	Bert Gadd & Charlie Ward	146	1 stroke	Freddie Beck & Ken Hooker; Bill Peters & A Wells; Jack Seager & Frank Weston	Ladbrook Park	
1933	George Oke & Charles Whitcombe	143	2 strokes	Bill Davies & Bob Kenyon	Sandwell Park	
1934–1937: No tournament
1938	Bill Firkins & Algy Holton	144	4 strokes	William Button & Herbert Manton; Jack Cawsey & Jack Hargreaves; H Lewis & F Reynolds	Moor Hall	
1939	Bill Branch & George Johnson	146	1 stroke	Jack Cawsey & Jack Hargreaves	Kings Norton	
1940–1955: No tournament
Martini Midland Professional Foursomes
1956–1960: see Martini Professional Foursomes
1961–1962: No tournament
Stuart C. Goodwin Midland Professional Foursomes
1963	George Bell & Horace Lester	4 & 2		Don Smart & Charlie Ward	Sherwood Forest	
1964: No tournament
Bass, Mitchells & Butlers Midland Professional Foursomes
1965	David Astill & David Talbot	145	2 strokes	Stuart Murray & Charlie Ward	Little Aston	

In 1907 and 1908 all matches were over 36 holes. The finals in 1913, 1914 and 1920 were also over 36 holes.
