= Arthur Ham (golfer) =

English professional golfer

Personal information
- Full name: Arthur Robert Ham
- Nationality: England
- Born: 11 April 1891 Wells, Somerset, England
- Died: 29 September 1959 (aged 68) Charlotte, North Carolina

Career
- Sport: Golf
- Status: Professional

Best results in major championships
- Masters Tournament: DNP
- PGA Championship: T17: 1924
- U.S. Open: T48: 1930
- The Open Championship: DNP

Arthur Robert Ham (11 April 1891 – 29 September 1959) was an English professional golfer. He was a professional in England and New Zealand, before settling in the United States where he was a professional at a number of clubs. He won the 1922 New Zealand Professional Championship and was runner-up in the 1923 Australian Open.

== Professional in England ==
Ham was born in Wells, Somerset, England on 11 April 1891. He became the professional at Blackwell Golf Club near Bromsgrove, Worcestershire, in about 1910. In 1914, playing with George Tuck, they won the Midland Professional Foursomes at Stourbridge. Soon afterwards he moved to the North Shore club in Skegness. Ham had some useful performances after World War I, including reaching the last-16 of the 1920 News of the World Match Play, only losing at the 19th hole.

== Professional in New Zealand ==
In late 1921, Ham left the North Shore club to become the professional at Wellington Golf Club, at Heretaunga, Wellington, New Zealand. He won the 1922 New Zealand Professional Championship beating Andrew Shaw 2&1 in the final. In August 1923 Ham travel to South Australia to play at the championship meeting being played at Royal Adelaide Golf Club. In the Australian Open, Ham was tied for the lead after the first round. However he dropped back after a third round of 79 and finished runner-up, three behind Tom Howard. The following day a 36-hole professional event was organised at the newly-opened Kooyonga Golf Club. Ham won the event by a stroke from Arthur Le Fevre and also had the best 18-hole score of 77. In the professional tournament the following week Ham just missed out on the match-play stage after finishing tied for 5th place in the 36-hole qualifying.

== Professional in the United States ==
Ham left New Zealand in late 1923, travelling to the United States. He soon became the professional at Plum Hollow Country Club in Detroit. He one of 32 players to reach the match-play stage of the 1924 PGA Championship and was runner-up to Al Watrous in the 1927 Michigan Open. He was later connected to other clubs in the Detroit area, before moving to Charlotte Country Club in Charlotte, North Carolina, in 1930. He later moved to other clubs in the Carolinas, including Myrtle Beach, Lenoir and Mount Airy. In 1946, at the age of 55, he qualified for the U.S. Open. He was also involved in golf course design. Ham died in Charlotte, on 29 September 1959.

== Results in major championships ==
Tournament	1924	1925	1926	1927	1928	1929	1930	1931	1932	1933	1934	1935	1936	1937	1938	1939	1940	1941	1942	1943	1944	1945	1946
U.S. Open						58	T48							T50					NT	NT	NT	NT	CUT
PGA Championship	R32																			NT			

Note: Ham only played in the U.S. Open and the PGA Championship.

Did not play

NT = No tournament
R32, R16, QF, SF = round in which player lost in PGA Championship match play
CUT = missed the half-way cut
"T" indicates a tie for a place
