= Stuart Goodwin =

British businessman (1886-1969)

Sir Stuart Coldwell Goodwin
- Born: 1886
- Died: 1969 (aged 82–83)
- Occupation: Philanthropist

Sir Stuart Coldwell Goodwin (19 April 1886 – 6 June 1969) was a Sheffield steel industrialist and philanthropist who gave away over £500,000 to charities, particularly in south Yorkshire and north Nottinghamshire.

He was head of the Neepsend Steel and Tool Corporation. He was knighted in the 1953 Coronation Honours list and was High Sheriff of Nottinghamshire in 1955.

Soon after the end of WW2 he launched a personal initiative. Because British industries needed to rebuild, but also to learn from other countries, Goodwin decided to provide funding for travelling fellowships specifically for young graduate engineers. Two "Sir Stuart Goodwin Fellowships" were awarded in each year between 1949 and 1958, all to recent graduates of Christ's College and St John's College Cambridge. The Fellowship was administered on his behalf by an committee led by David Rennie Hardman, who was previously the Parliament Secretary to the Ministry of Education in the British Government.

In 1962, he founded the Sir Stuart and Lady Florence Goodwin Charity. There is a sports centre in Sheffield named after him, as was the Goodwin Fountain on Fargate in the same city.

The Sir Stuart Goodwin room at Newark Showground is named after him. The Lady Goodwin Play Park in Farnsfield, Nottinghamshire, is named after Lady Florence.

== Golf sponsorship ==
Goodwin sponsored a foursomes tournament, the Goodwin (Sheffield) Foursomes Tournament, in 1952, 1953 and 1954 with prize money of £3,000 and another in 1956, the Stuart C. Goodwin Tournament, with prize money of £5,250. The £5,250 was the largest ever for a British golf event surpassing the £3,750 at the 1956 Open. All the tournaments were held in the Sheffield area, the 1953 event being held at Lindrick.

Goodwin offered the P.G.A. £10,000 to host the 1957 Ryder Cup at Lindrick, the gate money going to the P.G.A. who were responsible for all payments in connection with the match. With gate receipts of £16,127 the £10,000 donation enabled the P.G.A. to make a record profit of about £11,000 out of the event. He later made a gift of £5,000 to the R&A to help promote the Walker Cup and games with Commonwealth countries. In 1959 Goodwin sponsored the Sherwood Forest Foursomes Tournament, which had prize money of £2,100 and in 1963 he sponsored the Stuart C. Goodwin Midland Professional Foursomes. In 1964 Goodwin sponsored a £1,000 Ryder Cup Reunion Foursomes tournament at Hallamshire Golf Club. Each member of the Britain and Ireland team for the 1957 Ryder Cup was paired with a Yorkshire or Nottinghamshire professional in the 72-hole foursomes event, played over two days.

Goodwin was President of Lindrick Golf Club from 1958 to 1960. In 1960 Lindrick hosted the Curtis Cup. Goodwin gave the Ladies' Golf Union a gift of £2,000 to help stage the event and also guaranteed the LGU and Lindrick Golf Club against financial loss. Goodwin was a vice-president of the LGU.
