= Fred Collins (golfer) =

English golfer (1878–1940)

Personal information
- Full name: James Frederick Collins
- Nationality: England
- Born: 4 September 1878 Dunham Massey, Cheshire, England
- Died: 15 December 1940 (aged 62) Llandudno, Caernarfonshire, Wales

Career
- Sport: Golf
- Status: Professional
- Professional wins: 2

Best results in major championships
- Masters Tournament: DNP
- PGA Championship: DNP
- U.S. Open: DNP
- The Open Championship: T7: 1912

James Frederick Collins (4 September 1878 – 15 December 1940) was an English professional golfer. He won the Welsh Professional Championship in 1905 and then, 28 years later, in 1933. He represented England against Scotland in 1903 and 1904 and tied for seventh place in the 1912 Open Championship.

== Early life ==
Collins was born in the village of Dunham Massey, near Altrincham, Cheshire in 1878. Bowdon Golf Club was located at Dunham Massey.

== Golf career ==
Collins was runner-up in the 1904 Leeds Cup, a stroke behind Sandy Herd.

The 1905 Welsh Professional Championship was held at Conwy Golf Club on 23 August. There were 15 entries. Collins scored 153 for the two rounds and finished two shots ahead of George Duncan. However, Duncan had moved to Timperley and was only trying to qualify for the News of the World Matchplay, not being eligible for the Welsh Championship. Alfred Matthews, the Rhyl professional, was runner-up in the Championship on 160. The News of the World Matchplay had started in 1903 but in the first two years the Welsh professionals had had to play in the Northern or Midland sections qualifying events. Collins had qualified through the Midland section in 1904 and had lost to Sandy Herd in the first round. As winner, Collins received entry to the final stage of the 1905 News of the World Match Play, where he was due to meet Arnaud Massy. However both players scratched from the event.

Collins won the Welsh Professional Championship for a second time in 1933, 28 years after his first win. Played at Rhyl, Collins had rounds of 77-76-76-76 for a total of 305 and a one stroke win over Edward Musty.

Collins completed the four rounds of The Open Championship every year from 1901 to 1914 with the exception of 1906, when he missed the cut by one stroke.

== Personal life ==
Collins' nephew, Sidney Collins, the son of his brother Henry, was a professional golfer. He was at Sandiway Golf Club, Cheshire from 1920 to 1946. His son, Sid Collins Jr. (1912–1983), had some success as a tournament golfer, winning the Welsh Professional Championship twice, in 1938 and 1952, and the 1954 Goodwin (Sheffield) Foursomes Tournament, partnered by Bernard Hunt. Sid Jr. was an assistant to his father before becoming an assistant to his great-uncle Fred at Llandudno. Sid Jr. later became the professional at Llandudno after Fred's retirement.

== Death ==
Collins died at his home in Llandudno on 15 December 1940. He had been associated with Llandudno Golf Club for 46 years, mostly as a professional before becoming secretary because of ill health.

== Professional wins (2) ==
- 1905 Welsh Professional Championship
- 1933 Welsh Professional Championship

== Results in major championships ==
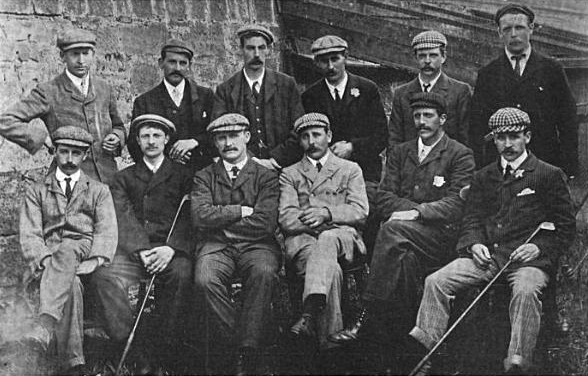
A group photo of the 1903 England team. Collins is standing second from the left

Tournament	1901	1902	1903	1904	1905	1906	1907	1908	1909
The Open Championship	T15	T32	T45	T19	T22	CUT	T15	T13	T21

Tournament	1910	1911	1912	1913	1914	1915	1916	1917	1918	1919
The Open Championship	36	12	T7	T11	T50	NT	NT	NT	NT	NT

Tournament	1920	1921	1922	1923	1924	1925	1926
The Open Championship	T70			T16			CUT

Note: Collins only played in The Open Championship.

Top 10
Did not play

NT = No tournament
CUT = missed the half-way cut
"T" indicates a tie for a place

== Team appearances ==
- England–Scotland Professional Match (representing England): 1903, 1904 (tie)
