= Carroll's International =

Golf tournament in Ireland

Tournament information
- Location: Shankill, Dublin, Ireland
- Established: 1963
- Course: Woodbrook Golf Club
- Par: 74
- Tour: European Tour
- Format: Stroke play
- Prize fund: £20,000
- Month played: June
- Final year: 1974

Tournament record score
- Aggregate: 268 Roberto De Vicenzo (1964); 268 Christy O'Connor Snr (1964)
- To par: −20 Neil Coles (1971)

Final champion
- (Scotland) Bernard Gallacher
- Location in Ireland

The Carroll's International was a professional golf tournament played in Ireland from 1963 to 1974. It was part of the British PGA tournament circuit, which evolved into the European Tour, and as such is recognised as an official European Tour event from 1972.

The tournament was founded by sponsors Carroll's in 1963, as a successor to the Irish Hospitals Tournament which had been held at Woodbrook Golf Club from 1958 to 1962. For the first two years, the Carroll's tournament was also played at Woodbrook and titled as the Carroll Sweet Afton tournament. It was played at Cork Golf Club in 1965 and The Royal Dublin Golf Club in 1966, before returning to Woodbrook where it remained until its final edition in 1974. The Carroll's International ended due to Carroll's becoming the title sponsor of the revived Irish Open in 1975; the Carroll's Irish Open was held at Woodbrook in its first year.

In 1966, at Royal Dublin, Christy O'Connor Snr finished 2-3-3 (eagle-birdie-eagle) to win the tournament by 2 strokes. At the par-4 16th he drove the green and holed a 20-foot putt. He then holed a 12-foot putt at the 17th and, at the par-5 18th, hit a 3-iron to 8 feet and holed the putt. A plaque by the 16th tee commemorates the achievement.

== Winners ==
Year	Winner	Score	To par	Margin of victory	Runner(s)-up	Winner's share (£)	Venue	Ref.
Carroll's Celebration International
1974	(Scotland) Bernard Gallacher	279	−17	3 strokes	(Australia) Jack Newton	5,000	Woodbrook	
Carroll's International
1973	(Republic of Ireland) Paddy McGuirk	277	−19	2 strokes	(South Africa) Hugh Baiocchi	2,500	Woodbrook	
1972	(Republic of Ireland) Christy O'Connor Snr (4)	284	−12	4 strokes	(England) David Talbot	2,500	Woodbrook	
1971	(England) Neil Coles (2)	276	−20	3 strokes	(England) Peter Oosterhuis	2,000	Woodbrook	
1970	(Wales) Brian Huggett	279		7 strokes	(Republic of Ireland) Christy O'Connor Snr	2,000	Woodbrook	
1969	(Scotland) Ronnie Shade	289		1 stroke	(Scotland) Bernard Gallacher	2,000	Woodbrook	
1968	(Republic of Ireland) Jimmy Martin	281		2 strokes	(Scotland) Brian Barnes	1,000	Woodbrook	
1967	(Republic of Ireland) Christy O'Connor Snr (3)	277		2 strokes	(England) Tommy Horton	1,000	Woodbrook	
1966	(Republic of Ireland) Christy O'Connor Snr (2)	272	−16	2 strokes	(Scotland) Eric Brown	1,000	Royal Dublin	
1965	(England) Neil Coles	269	−15	6 strokes	(England) Tommy Horton (England) Harry Weetman	1,000	Cork	
Carroll Sweet Afton
1964	(Republic of Ireland) Christy O'Connor Snr	268	−16	Playoff (Note: O'Connor won with a birdie on the second hole of a sudden-death playoff.)	(Argentina) Roberto De Vicenzo	1,000	Woodbrook	
1963	(England) Bernard Hunt	270		2 strokes	(England) Neil Coles	1,000	Woodbrook	

== See also ==
- Carroll's Number 1 Tournament
- Carroll's Irish Match Play Championship
