= Dunbar Open Tournament =

Tournament information
- Location: Dunbar, Scotland
- Established: 1952
- Course(s): Dunbar Golf Club
- Format: stroke play
- Month played: September
- Final year: 1954

The Dunbar Open Tournament was a golf tournament that was played from 1952 to 1954. It was a 72-hole stroke-play event played at Dunbar Golf Club. It was held from a Tuesday to Thursday in late September as part of a "Dunbar Golf Week". All competitors played one round on each of the opening two days, after which the leading 60 and ties played a further 36-holes on the final day. An amateur event was played on the Friday.

In the 1952 event Hector Thomson led after the first round. Thomson and Harry Bradshaw were tied after the second day. Bradshaw pulled ahead on the final day, with John Panton runner-up and Thomson dropping into a tie for third place. In 1953 Walter Lyle led after the first round but Syd Scott and Ian Anderson were joint leaders after the second round. Scott had a third round 69 to lead by five, a margin he retained after the final round. In 1954 Scott led by a stroke after an opening round of 71, and still led by a single shot after a second 74.. He extended his lead after a third round 70 and eventually won by four strokes.

== Winners ==
Year	Winner	Score	Margin of victory	Runner(s)-up	Winner's share (£)	Ref
1952	(Republic of Ireland) Harry Bradshaw	300	3 strokes	(Scotland) John Panton	80	
1953	(England) Syd Scott	283	5 strokes	(Scotland) Ian Anderson	100	
1954	(England) Syd Scott	287	4 strokes	(Scotland) Eric Brown (Scotland) John Panton	100	
