= Martini Professional Foursomes =

Series of foursomes golf tournaments

Tournament information
- Established: 1956
- Format: Stroke-play
- Final year: 1960

The Martini Professional Foursomes was a series of regional and national professional foursomes golf tournaments played in the England and Scotland between 1956 and 1960.

A Midland Professional Foursomes had been held between 1907 and 1939 but was not restarted after World War II. It was revived in 1956 as the Martini Midland Professional Foursomes. The event was a 36-hole stroke-play event, played in a single day. Players entered individually with the pairings randomly drawn. Total prize money was £300. David Snell and Charlie Ward won the event.

The Midland event continued in 1957 and a second event was added, the Martini Southern Professional Foursomes, held at Hill Barn Golf Club near Worthing. Both had prize money of £500. A third event was added in 1958, the Martini Northern Professional Foursomes, held at Pannal Golf Club near Harrogate. In 1959 four events were run, extended to cover all the PGA sections. A new event for the combined Scottish and Irish sections was held, while the Midland event was extended to include the Welsh and East Anglian sections and the Southern event was extended to include the West of England section.

In 1960 the same four regional tournaments were held but they also acted as qualifying events for a 72-hole national event which was held at The Berkshire club in late August, with prize money of £3,000. The tournaments were discontinued after 1960, Martini sponsoring a new event in 1961, the Martini International, with prize money of £6,000.

== Winners ==
=== Midlands section ===
In 1959 and 1960 this included the Welsh and East Anglian sections

Year	Winners	Score	Margin of victory	Runners-up	Venue	Ref
1956	David Snell & Charlie Ward	140	3 strokes	Bob Hastelow & George Maisey	Sutton Coldfield	
1957	Bill Firkins & Ralph Moffitt	142	2 strokes	Ken Dodsworth & Don Smart	Blackwell	
1958	Frank Miller & Ralph Moffitt	140	5 strokes	Jack Cawsey & Bob Hastelow; Len Smith & Maurice Youngs	Little Aston	
1959	Bill Firkins & Malcolm Hill	141	4 strokes	Dennis Fitton & Dick Kemp Jr. George Johnson & Norman Roffe	South Staffordshire	
1960	Bryon Hutchinson & John Wiggett	138	3 strokes	George Bell & Jack Hargreaves	Wollaton Park	

=== Southern section ===
In 1959 and 1960 this included the West of England section

Year	Winners	Score	Margin of victory	Runners-up	Venue	Ref
1957	Ken Bousfield & George Low	134	7 strokes	Jimmy McGhee & Arnold Stickley	Hill Barn	
1958	Dick Burton & Jimmy Hitchcock	139	1 stroke	Fred Boobyer & Eddie Ward; Arthur Harrison & Ross Whitehead	Hill Barn	
1959	Peter Alliss & Norman Sutton	139	Playoff	George Low & Brian White	Seaford	
1960	Roger Mandeville & Dave Thomas	138	Playoff	Fred Boobyer & Maurice Moir	Parkstone	

=== Northern section ===
Year	Winners	Score	Margin of victory	Runners-up	Venue	Ref
1958	Brian Allen & Bryon Hutchinson	139	11 strokes	Tony Coop & Ray Wilkinson	Pannal	
1959	John Jarman & Eric Lester	143	2 strokes	John Burton & Bill Hancock; Ken Geddes & Bill McHardy	Hillside	
1960	Brian Allen & John Easey	147	1 stroke	Tom Fairbairn & Malcolm Law; John Fallon & Bill Ferguson; Eric Lester & Hedley Muscroft	Pannal	

=== Scottish and Irish sections ===
Year	Winners	Score	Margin of victory	Runners-up	Venue	Ref
1959	Harry Bradshaw & Jim Henderson	143	3 strokes	Alex Fox & Jimmy Hume	Longniddry	
1960	Norman Drew & Willie Watson	151	2 strokes	Jimmy Henderson & Peter McQueen	Prestwick	

=== National ===
Year	Winners	Score	Margin of victory	Runners-up	Venue	Ref
1960	Bill Hector & Brian Wilkes	276	1 stroke	Norman Drew & Keith MacDonald	Berkshire	
