= 1957 Open Championship =

Coordinates: 56.343°N 2.803°W

Tournament information
- Dates: 3–5 July 1957
- Location: St Andrews, Scotland
- Course: Old Course at St Andrews

Statistics
- Par: 72
- Length: 6,936 yards (6,342 m)
- Field: 96 players, 46 after cut
- Cut: 148 (+4)
- Prize fund: £3,750 $10,500
- Winner's share: £1,000 $2,800

Champion
- (South Africa) Bobby Locke
- 279 (−9)

Location in Scotland
Location in Fife, Scotland

The 1957 Open Championship was the 86th Open Championship, played 3–5 July at the Old Course in St Andrews, Scotland. Bobby Locke, age 39, won his fourth and final Open title, three strokes ahead of runner-up Peter Thomson, who had won the three previous Opens.

The Open, last played at the Old Course just two years prior, was originally scheduled for Muirfield, but the "Suez Crisis" in Egypt in late 1956 led to serious fuel shortages in Britain and rationing of petrol. In early 1957, the Royal and Ancient decided that St Andrews, on a railway line, would be an easier place for players and spectators to get to than Muirfield, and so it was moved. Petrol rationing ended in May 1957 but it was then too late to switch back to the original venue and Muirfield was allocated the 1959 edition.

Qualifying took place on 1–2 July, Monday and Tuesday, with 18 holes on the Old Course and 18 holes on the New Course. With an entry of 295, compared to the record 360 entries the previous year, qualifying was in pairs rather than the three-balls used in 1956. The number of qualifiers was limited to a maximum of 100, and ties for 100th place were not included. Bernard Hunt and Bobby Locke led the qualifiers at 137; the qualifying score was 149 and 96 players advanced to the opening round on Wednesday.

There were fifteen American entries, many of them amateurs, but only four qualified for the field of 96: professionals Cary Middlecoff and Frank Stranahan finished in the top twenty and the two amateurs missed the cut.

During the first round on Wednesday, competitors playing behind Middlecoff demonstratively complained of his slow play. They officially protested to the R&A, which sided with Middlecoff, who had completed his 18-hole round with Antonio Cerdá in three hours and 18 minutes. The maximum number of players making the cut after 36 holes was set at fifty, and ties for 50th place were not included.

This was the first Open Championship in which the leaders after 36 holes went off last for the final 36 holes. Previously a random draw had been used. Flory Van Donck and Eric Brown, the leading two players after 36 holes were paired together in the final group for the final two rounds.

A mini-controversy surrounded the ending of the championship. Lying two, Bobby Locke was only four feet (1.2 m) from the cup on the 72nd hole when he moved his ball marker one putter-head length to avoid the line of fellow competitor Bruce Crampton's putt. After Crampton holed out, Locke forgot to replace his ball to its original position and sank his putt. Only much later were officials made aware of Locke's mistake; the Championship Committee decreed that no advantage had been gained and that the result, and Locke's three-stroke victory, stood. Australian golfer Peter Thomson was reportedly the person who informed officials of the infraction. Thomson was watching the end of the event on television that night and noticed the mistake. Though Locke still won, the incident "caused a deep divide between Thomson and Locke who had been good friends."

== Card of the course ==
Hole	Name	Yards	Par	Hole	Name	Yards	Par
1	Burn	374	4	10	Tenth ^	338	4
2	Dyke	411	4	11	High (In)	170	3
3	Cartgate (Out)	400	4	12	Heathery (In)	360	4
4	Ginger Beer	439	4	13	Hole O'Cross (In)	427	4
5	Hole O'Cross (Out)	567	5	14	Long	560	5
6	Heathery (Out)	377	4	15	Cartgate (In)	413	4
7	High (Out)	364	4	16	Corner of the Dyke	380	4
8	Short	163	3	17	Road	453	4
9	End	359	4	18	Tom Morris	381	4
Out		3,454	36	In		3,482	36
Source:				Total		6,936	72

^ The 10th hole was posthumously named for Bobby Jones in 1972

== Round summaries ==
=== First round ===
Wednesday, 3 July 1957

Place	Player	Score	To par
T1	(Scotland) Laurie Ayton, Jnr	67	−5
T1	(Scotland) Eric Brown	67	−5
3	(Australia) Bruce Crampton	68	−4
T4	(England) Jimmy Hitchcock	69	−3
T4	(South Africa) Bobby Locke	69	−3
T4	(England) Keith MacDonald	69	−3
T4	(England) Norman Sutton	69	−3
T8	(Argentina) Roberto De Vicenzo	70	−2
T8	(Northern Ireland) Norman Drew	70	−2
T8	(Scotland) Robin Galloway (a)	70	−2

=== Second round ===
Thursday, 4 July 1957

Place	Player	Score	To par
1	(Scotland) Eric Brown	67-72=139	−5
2	(Belgium) Flory Van Donck	72-68=140	−4
T3	(Australia) Bruce Crampton	68-73=141	−3
T3	(South Africa) Bobby Locke	69-72=141	−3
T5	(Argentina) Antonio Cerdá	71-71=142	−2
T5	(Scotland) John Fallon	75-67=142	−2
T5	(Australia) Peter Thomson	73-69=142	−2
T8	(Scotland) Laurie Ayton, Jnr	67-76=143	−1
T8	(England) Jimmy Hitchcock	69-74=143	−1
T8	(England) Keith MacDonald	69-74=143	−1
T8	(United States) Cary Middlecoff	72-71=143	−1
T8	(Scotland) John Panton	71-72=143	−1
T8	(Scotland) Dickson Smith (a)	71-72=143	−1

Amateurs: Smith (−1), Galloway (+2), Joe Carr (+6), Shepperson (+7), Sinclair (+7),
Butler (+8), Texier (+8), Will (+8), Lawrie (+9), Andrews (+10), Allan (+12), Reid (+12), Keck (+21).

=== Third round ===
Friday, 5 July 1957 - (morning)

Place	Player	Score	To par
1	(South Africa) Bobby Locke	69-72-68=209	−7
T2	(Scotland) Eric Brown	67-72-73=212	−4
T2	(Australia) Peter Thomson	73-69-70=212	−4
T4	(Scotland) Tom Haliburton	72-73-68=213	−3
T4	(Spain) Ángel Miguel	72-72-69=213	−3
T6	(Argentina) Antonio Cerdá	71-71-72=214	−2
T6	(Belgium) Flory Van Donck	72-68-74=214	−2
T8	(England) Henry Cotton	74-72-69=215	−1
T8	(Scotland) John Fallon	75-67-73=215	−1
T8	(England) Max Faulkner	74-70-71=215	−1
T8	(Scotland) Dickson Smith (a)	71-72-72=215	−1

=== Final round ===
Friday, 5 July 1957 - (afternoon)

Place	Player	Score	To par	Money (£)
1	(South Africa) Bobby Locke	69-72-68-70=279	−9	1,000
2	(Australia) Peter Thomson	73-69-70-70=282	−6	500
3	(Scotland) Eric Brown	67-72-73-71=283	−5	350
4	(Spain) Ángel Miguel	72-72-69-72=285	−3	200
T5	(Scotland) Tom Haliburton	72-73-68-73=286	−2	108
T5	(Scotland) Dickson Smith (a)	71-72-72-71=286	−2	–
T5	(Wales) Dave Thomas	72-74-70-70=286	−2	108
T5	(Belgium) Flory Van Donck	72-68-74-72=286	−2	108
T9	(Argentina) Antonio Cerdá	71-71-72-73=287	−1	58
T9	(England) Henry Cotton	74-72-69-72=287	−1	58
T9	(England) Max Faulkner	74-70-71-72=287	−1	58

Amateurs: Smith (−2), Galloway (+12).
