= 1954 Open Championship =

Coordinates: 53.622°N 3.033°W

Tournament information
- Dates: 7–9 July 1954
- Location: Southport, England
- Course: Royal Birkdale Golf Club

Statistics
- Par: 73
- Length: 6,867 yards (6,279 m)
- Field: 97 players, 50 after cut
- Cut: 151 (+5)
- Prize fund: £3,500
- Winner's share: £750

Champion
- (Australia) Peter Thomson
- 283 (−9)

Location in England
Location in Southport, Merseyside,
north of Liverpool, England

The 1954 Open Championship was the 90th Open Championship, played 7–9 July at Royal Birkdale Golf Club in Southport, England. Peter Thomson, age 23, won the first of his five Open titles by one stroke over runners-up Bobby Locke, Dai Rees, and Syd Scott. This was the first time the championship was held at Royal Birkdale.

The total prize money was increased forty per cent, from £2,500 to £3,500. The winner received £750 with £500 for second, £350 for third, £200 for fourth, £150 for fifth, £100 for sixth, £75 for seventh and eighth, £50 for ninth and tenth, £30 for next 15 places and then £25 each for the next 25 players. The £3,500 was completed with a £25 prize for winning the qualification event and four £25 prizes for the lowest score in each round.

Qualifying took place on 5–6 July, Monday and Tuesday, with 18 holes on the Championship course and 18 holes at Hillside Golf Club. The number of qualifiers was limited to a maximum of 100, and ties for 100th place would not qualify. On Monday, John McGonigle set a new course record of 65 on the Hillside course. Norman Von Nida led the qualifiers on 137, four ahead of the rest. and McGonigle shot 80 at Royal Birkdale for 145; the qualifying score was 151 and 97 players advanced. After a long voyage from America, Toney Penna and Jim Turnesa were amongst the group of sixteen on 151 who narrowly qualified.

Sam King and Bill Spence established a new course record at 69 in the opening round on Wednesday. It lasted just one day as Syd Scott bettered it in on Thursday with a 67, but Spence retained the lead after 36 holes at 141, one ahead of Antonio Cerdá, with Scott, Dai Rees, Thomson, and King one stroke back in a tie for third. A maximum of 50 players could make the cut after 36 holes, but ties for 50th place were not included. It was at 151 (+5) and fifty players advanced to the final two rounds.

Scott continued his hot play in the third round, scoring a 69. Thomson and Rees also carded 69 and joined him at the top of the leaderboard going into the final round. Scott shot a 72 over the last 18-holes, posting a clubhouse lead of 284. Rees also posted 284 after missing a putt at the 18th. Thomson missed a short putt at the 12th, but managed to get up-and-down from a bunker at 16. He went to the 17th needing a par and a bogey on his last two holes to become the new clubhouse leader. He got the par, but at 18 he found trouble in a bunker. He again managed a superb recovery, and while he missed his first putt he easily tapped in for a round of 71 and a 283 total. Bobby Locke had a chance to tie Thomson with a 3 at the last, but his birdie putt came up just short making Thomson the winner of the championship.

This win was the first in a run of three consecutive Open Championship titles by Thomson, becoming the first player since Bob Ferguson from 1880–82 to win three straight Opens. Altogether he would win three of the next four Opens and add another win in 1965, which was also held at Royal Birkdale. Thomson was the first Australian to win the Open Championship, and the youngest champion since Bobby Jones.

Three-time Masters champion Jimmy Demaret made his only Open Championship appearance this year and tied for tenth place. Defending champion Ben Hogan did not compete; his victory in 1953 at Carnoustie was his only Open Championship.

== Course layout ==
| Hole | 1 | 2 | 3 | 4 | 5 | 6 | 7 | 8 | 9 | Out | 10 | 11 | 12 | 13 | 14 | 15 | 16 | 17 | 18 | In | Total |
|---|---|---|---|---|---|---|---|---|---|---|---|---|---|---|---|---|---|---|---|---|---|
| Yards | 520 | 427 | 416 | 212 | 315 | 468 | 158 | 434 | 418 | 3,368 | 390 | 368 | 465 | 202 | 517 | 381 | 520 | 186 | 470 | 3,499 | 6,867 |
| Par | 5 | 4 | 4 | 3 | 4 | 5 | 3 | 4 | 4 | 36 | 4 | 4 | 5 | 3 | 5 | 4 | 5 | 3 | 4 | 37 | 73 |

== Round summaries ==
=== First round ===
Wednesday, 7 July 1954

| Place | Player | Score | To par |
|---|---|---|---|
| T1 | (England) Sam King | 69 | −4 |
| T1 | (England) Bill Spence | 69 | −4 |
| 3 | (England) Norman Sutton | 70 | −3 |
| T4 | (Argentina) Antonio Cerdá | 71 | −2 |
| T4 | (England) George Howard | 71 | −2 |
| T4 | (England) John Jacobs | 71 | −2 |
| T7 | (France) Jean-Baptiste Ado | 72 | −1 |
| T7 | (England) Peter Alliss | 72 | −1 |
| T7 | (Republic of Ireland) Harry Bradshaw | 72 | −1 |
| T7 | (England) Fred Bullock | 72 | −1 |
| T7 | (Italy) Ugo Grappasonni | 72 | −1 |
| T7 | (England) Robert Halsall | 72 | −1 |
| T7 | (England) Eric Lester | 72 | −1 |
| T7 | (Wales) Dai Rees | 72 | −1 |
| T7 | (Australia) Bill Shankland | 72 | −1 |
| T7 | (Australia) Peter Thomson | 72 | −1 |
| T7 | (Australia) Peter Toogood (a) | 72 | −1 |
| T7 | (United States) Jim Turnesa | 72 | −1 |

=== Second round ===
Thursday, 8 July 1954

| Place | Player | Score | To par |
|---|---|---|---|
| 1 | (England) Bill Spence | 69-72=141 | −5 |
| 2 | (Argentina) Antonio Cerdá | 71-71=142 | −4 |
| T3 | (Argentina) Sam King | 69-74=143 | −3 |
| T3 | (Wales) Dai Rees | 72-71=143 | −3 |
| T3 | (Australia) Peter Thomson | 72-71=143 | −3 |
| T3 | (England) Syd Scott | 76-67=143 | −3 |
| T7 | (Republic of Ireland) Harry Bradshaw | 72-72=144 | −2 |
| T7 | (United States) Jimmy Demaret | 73-71=144 | −2 |
| T7 | (Wales) John Jacobs | 71-73=144 | −2 |
| T7 | (Australia) Bill Shankland | 72-72=144 | −2 |
| T7 | (England) Jim Turnesa | 72-72=144 | −2 |

Amateurs: Toogood (+1), Stranahan (+2), Stockdale (+6), Timms (+6),
Bachli (+7), Brews (+8), Coogan (+8), Shephard (+8), Wroe (+10),
Wolstenholme (+11), Heard (+12), Stevens (+19).

=== Third round ===
Friday, 9 July 1954 (morning)

| Place | Player | Score | To par |
|---|---|---|---|
| T1 | (Wales) Dai Rees | 72-71-69=212 | −7 |
| T1 | (England) Syd Scott | 76-67-69=212 | −7 |
| T1 | (Australia) Peter Thomson | 72-71-69=212 | −7 |
| 4 | (South Africa) Bobby Locke | 74-71-69=214 | −5 |
| T5 | (Argentina) Antonio Cerdá | 71-71-73=215 | −4 |
| T5 | (England) Bill Spence | 69-72-74=215 | −4 |
| T5 | (United States) Jim Turnesa | 72-72-71=215 | −4 |
| T8 | (Scotland) Jimmy Adams | 73-75-69=217 | −2 |
| T8 | (England) Peter Alliss | 72-74-71=217 | −2 |
| T8 | (Republic of Ireland) Harry Bradshaw | 72-72-73=217 | −2 |
| T8 | (England) Sam King | 69-74-74=217 | −2 |

=== Final round ===
Friday, 9 July 1954 (afternoon)

| Place | Player | Score | To Par | Money (£) |
|---|---|---|---|---|
| 1 | (Australia) Peter Thomson | 72-71-69-71=283 | −9 | 750 |
| T2 | (South Africa) Bobby Locke | 74-71-69-70=284 | −8 | 350 |
| T2 | (Wales) Dai Rees | 72-71-69-72=284 | −8 | 350 |
| T2 | (England) Syd Scott | 76-67-69-72=284 | −8 | 350 |
| T5 | (Scotland) Jimmy Adams | 73-75-69-69=286 | −6 | 108 |
| T5 | (Argentina) Antonio Cerdá | 71-71-73-71=286 | −6 | 108 |
| T5 | (United States) Jim Turnesa | 72-72-71-71=286 | −6 | 108 |
| T8 | (England) Peter Alliss | 72-74-71-70=287 | −5 | 62 |
| T8 | (England) Sam King | 69-74-74-70=287 | −5 | 62 |
| T10 | (United States) Jimmy Demaret | 73-71-74-71=289 | −3 | 40 |
| T10 | (Belgium) Flory Van Donck | 77-71-70-71=289 | −3 | 40 |

Amateurs: Toogood (−1), Stranahan (+3).
