= Sid Collins Jr. =

English golfer (1912–1983)

Sid Collins
Personal information
- Full name: William Sidney Collins
- Nationality: England
- Born: 23 December 1912 Northwich, Cheshire, England
- Died: 2 January 1983 (aged 70) London, England

Career
- Sport: Golf
- Status: Professional
- Professional wins: 3

Best results in major championships
- Masters Tournament: DNP
- PGA Championship: DNP
- U.S. Open: DNP
- The Open Championship: T26: 1938

William Sidney Collins Jr. (23 December 1912 – 2 January 1983) was an English professional golfer. He won the Welsh Professional Championship in 1938 and 1952, and the 1954 Goodwin (Sheffield) Foursomes Tournament, partnered by Bernard Hunt.

== Early life ==
Collins was born in Northwich, Cheshire in late 1912. His father was the professional at Mid Cheshire Golf Club at the time.

== Golf career ==
After leaving school Collins was an assistant to his father at Sandiway Golf Club before becoming an assistant to his great-uncle Fred Collins at Llandudno. He later became the professional at Llandudno after Fred's retirement.

Collins won the 1938 Welsh Professional Championship at St Mellons, his first appearance in the event. He scored 291 for the 72 holes, to win by 5 strokes from the holder and local professional, Frank Hill and Gwyn James of Newport.

Collins won the Welsh Professional Championship for a second time in 1950 at Southerndown. His score of 301 was 3 ahead of defending champion Harry Gould and R Jenkins.

Partnered by Bernard Hunt, Collins won the 1954 Goodwin (Sheffield) Foursomes Tournament at Rotherham Golf Club, beating John Fallon and Wally Smithers in the final. The match was level after 33 holes but a birdie 2 at the 34th and a par 4 at the 35th gave Collins and Hunt a 2&1 victory.

== Death ==
Collins died on 2 January 1983 in London, although his home address was in Llandudno.

== Professional wins (2) ==
- 1938 Welsh Professional Championship
- 1952 Welsh Professional Championship
- 1954 Goodwin (Sheffield) Foursomes Tournament (with Bernard Hunt)

== Results in major championships ==
Tournament	1939	1940	1941	1942	1943	1944	1945	1946	1947	1948	1949	1950	1951	1952
The Open Championship	T26	NT	NT	NT	NT	NT	NT	CUT		T32	CUT			CUT

Note: Collins only played in The Open Championship.

Did not play

NT = No tournament
CUT = missed the half-way cut
"T" indicates a tie for a place
