= Sid Collins =

Sid Collins or Sidney Collins may refer to:

- Sid Collins (broadcaster) (1922–1977), American sports broadcaster
- Sid Collins Jr. (1912–1983), English golfer

== See also ==
- Sydney Collins (born 1999), Canadian-American soccer player
