= 1955 Ryder Cup =

Golf tournament in the United States

11th Ryder Cup Matches
- Dates: November 5–6, 1955
- Venue: Thunderbird Country Club
- Location: Rancho Mirage, California
- Captains: Chick Harbert (USA); Dai Rees (Great Britain)
| (United States) | 8 | 4 | (United Kingdom) |
- United States wins the Ryder Cup

Location map
- Location within California

The 11th Ryder Cup Matches were held November 5–6, 1955, at Thunderbird Country Club in Rancho Mirage, California. The United States team won its seventh consecutive competition by a score of 8 to 4 points.

== Format ==
The Ryder Cup is a match play event, with each match worth one point. From 1927 through 1959, the format consisted of 4 foursome (alternate shot) matches on the first day and 8 singles matches on the second day, for a total of 12 points. Therefore, 6 1/2 points were required to win the Cup. All matches were played to a maximum of 36 holes.

== Teams ==
Team USA
| Name | Age | Previous Ryder Cups | Matches | W–L–H | Winning percentage |
| Chick Harbert – captain | 40 | 1 | 1 | 1–0–0 | 100.00 |
| Jerry Barber | 39 | 0 | Rookie |
| Tommy Bolt | 39 | 0 | Rookie |
| Jack Burke Jr. | 32 | 2 | 4 | 4–0–0 | 100.00 |
| Doug Ford | 33 | 0 | Rookie |
| Marty Furgol | 39 | 0 | Rookie |
| Chandler Harper | 41 | 0 | Rookie |
| Ted Kroll | 36 | 1 | 2 | 1–1–0 | 50.00 |
| Cary Middlecoff | 34 | 1 | 2 | 1–1–0 | 50.00 |
| Sam Snead | 43 | 5 | 9 | 7–2–0 | 77.78 |

Seven members of the British team were chosen from the Order of Merit after the 1955 Open Championship. To qualify players had to play in 5 of the 6 qualifying events. The qualifying events were all stroke-play tournaments played in Great Britain from the Spalding Tournament ending on 22 April to the Open Championship ending on 8 July. The last three places were chosen by the seven players already selected and the four members of the PGA tournament sub-committee. The seven who qualified after the Open were: Rees, Bradshaw, Scott, Weetman, O'Connor, Bousfield and Jacobs. Later in July, Rees was chosen as captain. The three remaining players, Brown, Lees and Fallon, were chosen at the end of the Dunlop Masters in September. Brown had recently lost in the final of the News of the World Match Play where Lees was a losing semi-finalist. Fallon was runner-up in the Open Championship.

Team Great Britain
| Name | Age | Previous Ryder Cups | Matches | W–L–H | Winning percentage |
| (Wales) Dai Rees – captain | 42 | 5 | 8 | 2–5–1 | 31.25 |
| (England) Ken Bousfield | 36 | 2 | 2 | 1–1–0 | 50.00 |
| (Republic of Ireland) Harry Bradshaw | 42 | 1 | 2 | 2–0–0 | 100.00 |
| (Scotland) Eric Brown | 30 | 1 | 2 | 1–1–0 | 50.00 |
| (Scotland) John Fallon | 42 | 0 | Rookie |
| (England) John Jacobs | 30 | 0 | Rookie |
| (England) Arthur Lees | 47 | 3 | 6 | 3–3–0 | 50.00 |
| (Republic of Ireland) Christy O'Connor Snr | 30 | 0 | Rookie |
| (England) Syd Scott | 41 | 0 | Rookie |
| (England) Harry Weetman | 35 | 2 | 3 | 1–2–0 | 33.33 |

== Saturday's foursome matches ==
| | Results |
|---|---|---|
| Fallon/Jacobs | (United Kingdom) 1 up | Harper/Barber |
| Brown/Scott | (United States) 5 & 4 | Ford/Kroll |
| Lees/Weetman | (United States) 1 up | Burke/Bolt |
| Bradshaw/Rees | (United States) 3 & 2 | Snead/Middlecoff |
| 1 | Session | 3 |
| 1 | Overall | 3 |

18 hole scores: Harper/Barber: 2 up, Ford/Kroll: 3 up, Lees/Weetman: 1 up, Bradshaw/Rees v Snead/Middlecoff: all square.

== Sunday's singles matches ==
| | Results |
|---|---|---|
| Christy O'Connor | (United States) 4 & 2 | Tommy Bolt |
| Syd Scott | (United States) 3 & 2 | Chick Harbert |
| John Jacobs | (United Kingdom) 1 up | Cary Middlecoff |
| Dai Rees | (United States) 3 & 1 | Sam Snead |
| Arthur Lees | (United Kingdom) 3 & 2 | Marty Furgol |
| Eric Brown | (United Kingdom) 3 & 2 | Jerry Barber |
| Harry Bradshaw | (United States) 3 & 2 | Jack Burke Jr. |
| Harry Weetman | (United States) 3 & 2 | Doug Ford |
| 3 | Session | 5 |
| 4 | Overall | 8 |

18 hole scores: Bolt: 3 up, Harbert: 6 up, Middlecoff: 2 up, Snead: 5 up, Lees v Furgol: all square, Brown: 3 up, Bradshaw v Burke: all square, Ford: 1 up.

== Individual player records ==
Each entry refers to the win–loss–half record of the player.

=== United States ===
| Player | Points | Overall | Singles | Foursomes |
|---|---|---|---|---|
| Jerry Barber | 0 | 0–2–0 | 0–1–0 | 0–1–0 |
| Tommy Bolt | 2 | 2–0–0 | 1–0–0 | 1–0–0 |
| Jack Burke Jr. | 2 | 2–0–0 | 1–0–0 | 1–0–0 |
| Doug Ford | 2 | 2–0–0 | 1–0–0 | 1–0–0 |
| Marty Furgol | 0 | 0–1–0 | 0–1–0 | 0–0–0 |
| Chick Harbert | 1 | 1–0–0 | 1–0–0 | 0–0–0 |
| Chandler Harper | 0 | 0–1–0 | 0–0–0 | 0–1–0 |
| Ted Kroll | 1 | 1–0–0 | 0–0–0 | 1–0–0 |
| Cary Middlecoff | 1 | 1–1–0 | 0–1–0 | 1–0–0 |
| Sam Snead | 2 | 2–0–0 | 1–0–0 | 1–0–0 |

=== Great Britain ===
| Player | Points | Overall | Singles | Foursomes |
|---|---|---|---|---|
| Harry Bradshaw | 0 | 0–2–0 | 0–1–0 | 0–1–0 |
| Eric Brown | 1 | 1–1–0 | 1–0–0 | 0–1–0 |
| John Fallon | 1 | 1–0–0 | 0–0–0 | 1–0–0 |
| John Jacobs | 2 | 2–0–0 | 1–0–0 | 1–0–0 |
| Arthur Lees | 1 | 1–1–0 | 1–0–0 | 0–1–0 |
| Christy O'Connor | 0 | 0–1–0 | 0–1–0 | 0–0–0 |
| Dai Rees | 0 | 0–2–0 | 0–1–0 | 0–1–0 |
| Syd Scott | 0 | 0–2–0 | 0–1–0 | 0–1–0 |
| Harry Weetman | 0 | 0–2–0 | 0–1–0 | 0–1–0 |

Ken Bousfield did not play in any matches.
