= Arthur Day (golfer) =

English golfer (1878–1944)

Personal information
- Nationality: England
- Born: 29 July 1878 Burnham-on-Sea, Somerset, England
- Died: 10 December 1944 (aged 66) Ganton, Yorkshire, England

Career
- Sport: Golf
- Status: Professional
- Professional wins: 2

Best results in major championships
- Masters Tournament: DNP
- PGA Championship: DNP
- U.S. Open: DNP
- The Open Championship: T29: 1920

Arthur Day (29 July 1878 – 10 December 1944) was an English professional golfer. Day won the inaugural Welsh Professional Championship in 1904. Later he was the professional at Ganton Golf Club for over 30 years during which time he won the 1921 Leeds Cup.

== Early life ==
Day was born in Burnham-on-Sea, Somerset, the son of Joseph and Elizabeth Day. He learnt his golf at the nearby Burnham & Berrow Golf Club.

== Golf career ==
Representing Burnham, Day played in a professional tournament at Royal North Devon Golf Club in August 1899. He played in the initial 36-hole stroke-play stage but was not in the leading 16 who qualified for the match-play stage. Soon afterwards he moved to Tenby and played from there in the 1900 Open Championship. He remained at Tenby until 1905, when he moved to Scarborough Town Golf Club to replace Willie Gaudin. During his time at Tenby he won the first Welsh Professional Championship which was held at Radyr Golf Club on 15 July 1904. It was a 36-hole stroke-play event played on a single day. Day was among the 19 entries and had rounds of 81 and 80 for a total of 161. This put him three strokes ahead of the joint runners-up, 20-year-old George Duncan and Bill Leaver, who had finished 8th in the 1903 Open Championship. For his win he received 10 guineas and a gold medal.

Day was at Scarborough Town until 1913 when he left to become the Ganton Golf Club professional in succession to P.J. Adams. While at Ganton he won the 1921 Leeds Cup which was played at Ganton. His 36-hole score of 147 was 4 strokes ahead of the field and he took the first prize of £10.

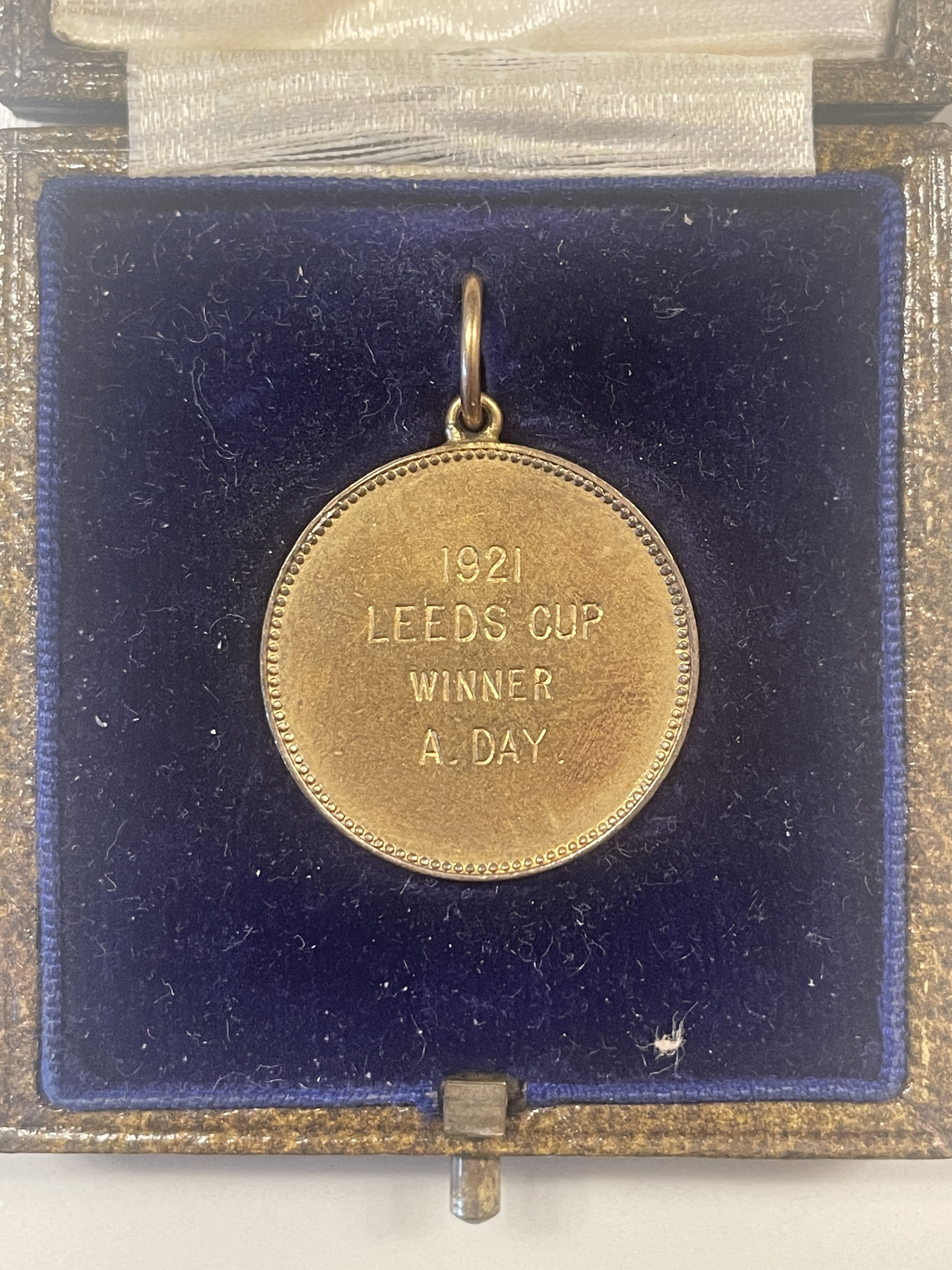
1921 Winners Medal

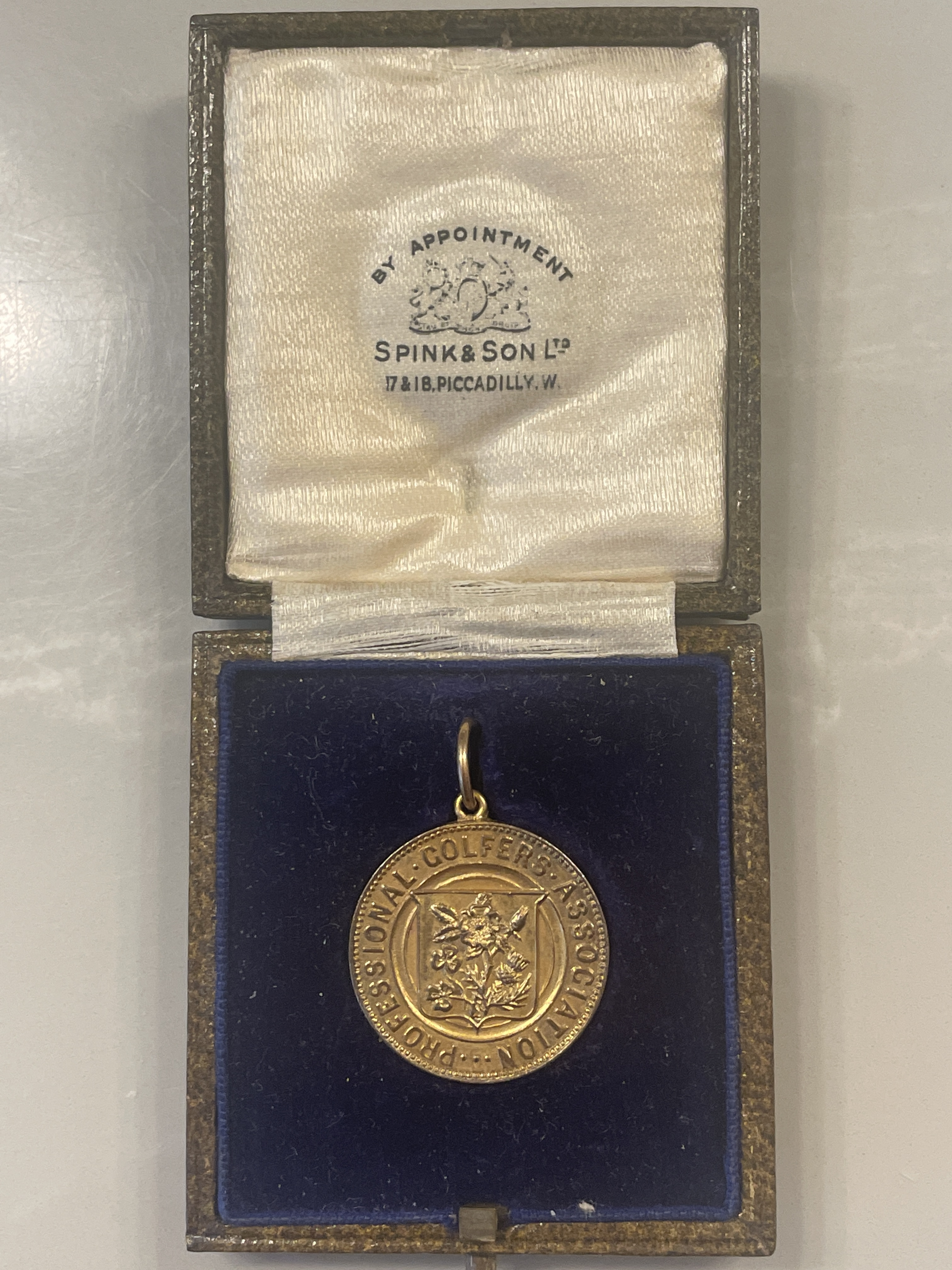
1921 Leeds Cup Winners Medal

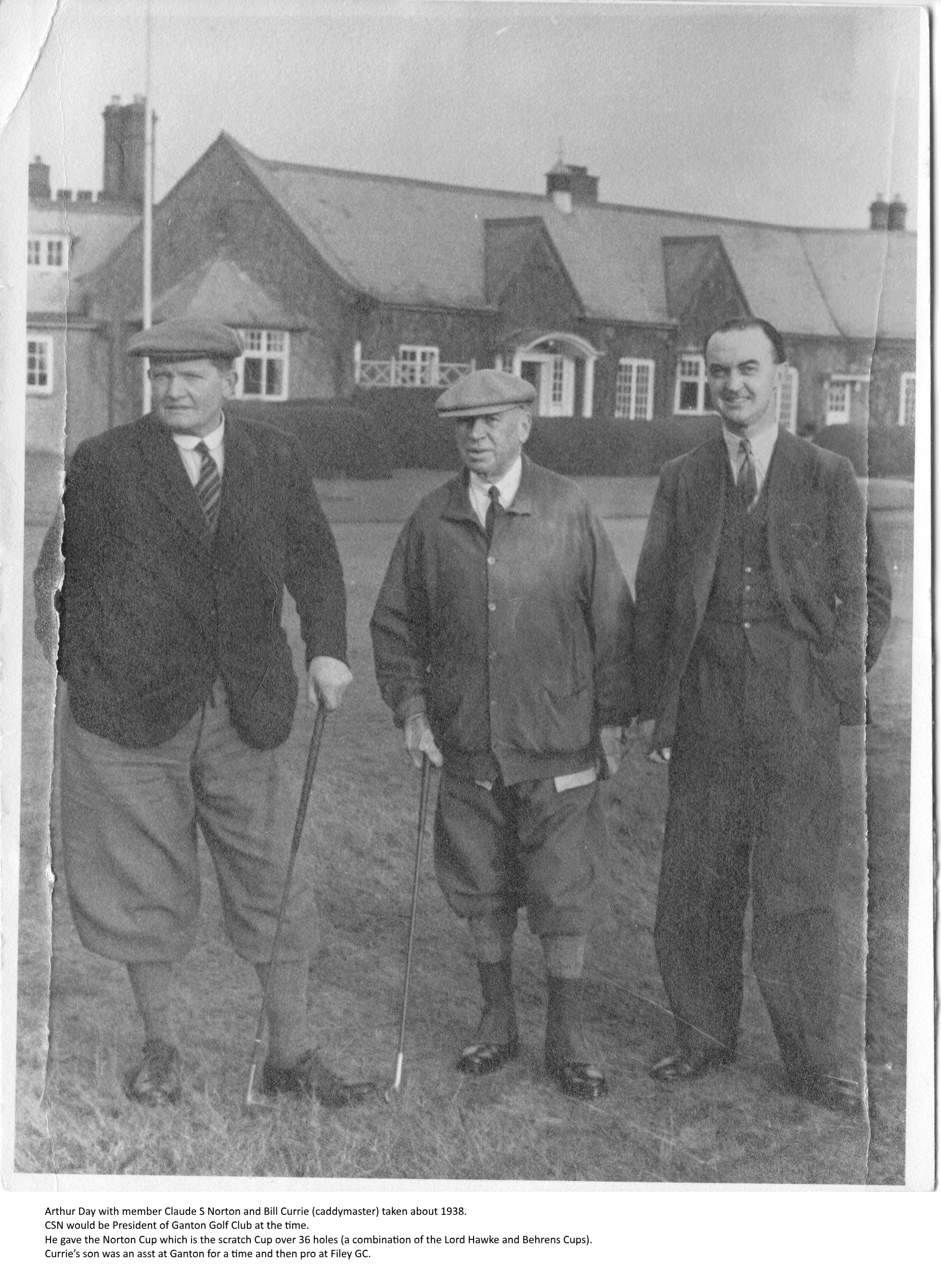
Arthur Day

== Death ==
Day was still the Ganton professional when he died at his home there on 10 December 1944. He had two sons, Phil and Hugh, who were both professional golfers. He was replaced at Ganton by Jock Ballantine who was appointed in early 1946.

== Professional wins ==
- 1904 Welsh Professional Championship
- 1921 Leeds Cup

== Results in major championships ==
| Tournament | 1900 | 1901 | 1902 | 1903 | 1904 | 1905 | 1906 | 1907 | 1908 | 1909 |
|---|---|---|---|---|---|---|---|---|---|---|
| The Open Championship | CUT | | | | | | | WD | | T51 |

| Tournament | 1910 | 1911 | 1912 | 1913 | 1914 | 1915 | 1916 | 1917 | 1918 | 1919 |
|---|---|---|---|---|---|---|---|---|---|---|
| The Open Championship | ? | | | | | NT | NT | NT | NT | NT |

| Tournament | 1920 | 1921 | 1922 | 1923 | 1924 | 1925 | 1926 | 1927 | 1928 | 1929 |
|---|---|---|---|---|---|---|---|---|---|---|
| The Open Championship | T29 | T61 | | T53 | | T54 | CUT | | WD | CUT |

Note: Day only played in The Open Championship.

Did not play

NT = No tournament
WD = withdrew
CUT = missed the half-way cut
? = finish unknown
"T" indicates a tie for a place
