= 1955 Canada Cup =

Coordinates: 38.989°N 77.0794°W

Tournament information
- Dates: June 9–12
- Location: Chevy Chase, Maryland, United States
- Course: Columbia Country Club
- Format: 72 holes stroke play combined score

Statistics
- Par: 70
- Field: 25 two-man teams
- Cut: None
- Prize fund: US$15,300
- Winner's share: $2,500 team $2,500 individual

Champion
- United States; Ed Furgol & Chick Harbert
- 560 (E)

The 1955 Canada Cup took place June 9–12 at the Columbia Country Club in Chevy Chase, Maryland, a suburb northwest of Washington, D.C., United States. It was the third Canada Cup event, which became the World Cup in 1967. The tournament was a 72-hole stroke play team event with 25 teams; the same teams that had contested the 1954 event. Each team consisted of two players from a country. The combined score of each team determined the team results. The American team of Ed Furgol and Chick Harbert won by nine strokes over the Australian team of Kel Nagle and Peter Thomson. For the first time there was an official competition for the leading individual score. This was won by Ed Furgol, who beat Peter Thomson and Flory Van Donck in a sudden-death playoff.

== Teams ==
Country	Players
Argentina	Antonio Cerdá and Roberto De Vicenzo
Australia	Kel Nagle and Peter Thomson
Belgium	Arthur Devulder and Flory Van Donck
Brazil	Mário Gonzalez and Ricardo Rossi
Canada	Pat Fletcher and Stan Leonard
Chile	Luciano Calderon and Alberto Salas
Colombia	Raúl Posse and Miguel Sala
Egypt	Naaman Aly and Hassan Hassanein
England	Peter Alliss and Norman Sutton
France	Jean Garaïalde and François Saubaber
West Germany	Georg Bessner and Friedel Schmaderer
Ireland	Harry Bradshaw and Fred Daly
Italy	Alfonso Angelini and Ugo Grappasonni
Japan	Kashio Kurihara and Koichi Ono
Mexico	Percy Clifford and Amado Martinez
Netherlands	Gerard de Wit and Piet Witte
New Zealand	Frank Buckler and Alf Guy
Philippines	Larry Montes and Celestino Tugot
(Denmark) (Sweden) Scandinavia	Carl Paulsen and Arne Werkell
Scotland	Eric Brown and John Panton
South Africa	George Farmer and Brian Wilkes
Spain	Ángel Miguel and Sebastián Miguel
Switzerland	Ernest Bauer and Robert Lanz
United States	Ed Furgol and Chick Harbert
Wales	Harry Gould and Dennis Smalldon

The Scandinavian team consisted of a Dane, Carl Paulsen, and a Swede, Arne Werkell.

== Scores ==
Team

Place	Country	Score	To par	Money (US$)
1	United States	143-139-139-139=560	E	2,500
2	Australia	139-146-139-145=569	+9	1,500
3	Scotland	145-141-141-144=571	+11	1,000
T4	Argentina	144-139-144-146=573	+13	500
T4	Belgium	144-139-143-147=573	+13	500
T6	England	147-141-145-142=575	+15	500
T6	West Germany	146-143-142-144=575	+15	500
8	Ireland	147-138-143-152=580	+20	500
9	Italy	144-147-150-142=583	+23	500
T10	Canada	149-143-147-145=584	+24	250
T10	Colombia	149-147-145-143=584	+24	250
12	Philippines	146-149-147-146=588	+28	
T13	Brazil	150-145-145-151=591	+31	
T13	Japan	148-147-152-144=591	+31	
15	France	146-146-151-149=592	+32	
T16	Egypt	159-151-145-140=595	+35	
T16	Wales	150-153-147-145=595	+35	
18	Spain	155-143-143-155=596	+35	
T19	Netherlands	154-149-150-147=600	+40	
T19	South Africa	152-154-145-149=600	+40	
T21	Mexico	151-147-153-152=603	+43	
T21	Scandinavia	152-146-150-155=603	+43	
23	New Zealand	149-150-149-156=604	+44	
24	Chile	149-159-143-160=611	+51	
25	Switzerland	157-149-161-156=623	+63	

International Trophy

Place	Player	Country	Score	To par	Money (US$)
1	Ed Furgol	United States	73-70-69-67=279	−1	2,500
2	Peter Thomson	Australia	67-74-67-71=279	−1	1,500
3	Flory Van Donck	Belgium	70-66-73-70=279	−1	1,000
4	Chick Harbert	United States	70-69-70-72=281	+1	500
5	Harry Bradshaw	Ireland	74-66-72-72=284	+4	500
T6	Eric Brown	Scotland	72-70-70-73=285	+5	500
T6	Mário Gonzalez	Brazil	73-67-72-73=285	+5	500
T8	Antonio Cerdá	Argentina	74-70-72-70=286	+6	500
T8	John Panton	Scotland	73-71-71-71=286	+6	500

Furgol, Thomson and Van Donck contested a sudden-death playoff. Van Donck dropped out after a bogey at the second extra hole. Thomson took a bogey at the third hole which gave Furgol the victory after his par. Thomson took the second prize and Van Donck the third prize.

There were additional prizes of $100 each day for the lowest team and individual scores, additional prize money of $800. The team prizes were won the Australia (day 1), Ireland (day 2), the United States and Australia (day 3) and the United States (day 4). The individual prizes went to Peter Thomson (day 1), Harry Bradshaw and Flory Van Donck (day 2), Peter Thomson (day 3) and Ed Furgol (day 4).

All players received $500 in expense money.
