= Harry Gould (golfer) =

Welsh golfer (1914–2000)

Personal information
- Full name: Harold Gould
- Nationality: Wales
- Born: 30 July 1914 Bridgend, Glamorgan, Wales
- Died: 11 September 2000 (aged 86) Bridgend, Glamorgan, Wales

Career
- Sport: Golf
- Status: Professional
- Professional wins: 6

Best results in major championships
- Masters Tournament: DNP
- PGA Championship: DNP
- U.S. Open: DNP
- The Open Championship: T30: 1948

Harold Gould (30 July 1914 – 11 September 2000) was a Welsh professional golfer. He won the Welsh Professional Championship six times between 1946 and 1963 and twice represented Wales in the Canada Cup.

== Golf career ==
Gould finished tied for second place in the 1949 PGA Assistants' Championship, five shots behind the winner, Harry Weetman and tied with Peter Alliss.

Gould was an assistant professional at Radyr Golf Club before World War II, moving to Royal Porthcawl Golf Club after the war and to Southerndown Golf Club in 1950.

Gould played in the 1954 Canada Cup with Dai Rees and the 1955 Canada Cup with Dennis Smalldon. In 1954 Gould scored 316 for his four rounds, 34 shots worse than Rees. The following year he improved, scoring 299, three strokes behind his partner Smalldon.

Gould won his sixth Welsh Professional Championship in June 1963 at the age of 48.

== Tournament wins ==
- 1946 Welsh Professional Championship
- 1948 Welsh Professional Championship
- 1949 Welsh Professional Championship
- 1951 Welsh Professional Championship
- 1954 Welsh Professional Championship
- 1963 Welsh Professional Championship

== Results in major championships ==
Tournament	1947	1948
The Open Championship	CUT	T30

Note: Gould only played in The Open Championship.

CUT = missed the half-way cut
"T" indicates a tie for a place

== Team appearances ==
- Canada Cup (representing Wales): 1954, 1955
