= Irish Hospitals Tournament =

Tournament information
- Location: Bray, County Wicklow, Ireland
- Established: 1958
- Course(s): Woodbrook Golf Club
- Final year: 1962

Final champion
- Christy O'Connor Snr

Location in Ireland

The Irish Hospitals Tournament was a professional golf tournament played from 1958 to 1962. Total prize money was £5000 from 1958 to 1960 and £5,555 in 1961 and 1962. It was sponsored by the Irish Hospitals' Sweepstake. In 1963 it was succeeded by the Carroll Sweet Afton Tournament which later became the Carroll's International.

Kel Nagle's 1961 performance of 260 was reportedly the lowest score ever recorded at a 72 hole tournament outside of the United States. As of 1973, it had yet to be broken.

== Winners ==
Year	Winner	Country	Score	Margin of victory	Runner(s)-up	Winner's share (£)	Ref
1958	Bernard Hunt	England	277	Tie		Shared 1,000 and 500	
1958	Frank Jowle	England	277	Tie		Shared 1,000 and 500	
1959	Max Faulkner	England	274	4 strokes	(England) Peter Alliss (Wales) Dave Thomas	1,000	
1960	Christy O'Connor Snr	Ireland	272	Playoff (18 holes)	(England) Ken Bousfield	1,000	
1961	Kel Nagle	Australia	260	4 strokes	(England) Peter Alliss	1,000	
1962	Christy O'Connor Snr	Ireland	271	1 stroke	(New Zealand) Bob Charles	1,000	

In 1960 O'Connor scored 63 in the play-off to Bousfield's 71.
