= Dennis Smalldon =

Welsh professional golfer

Personal information
- Full name: Dennis Frederick George Smalldon
- Nationality: Wales
- Born: 1926 Devon, England
- Died: 12 September 1959 (aged 33) Hereford, England

Career
- Sport: Golf
- Status: Professional
- Professional wins: 5

Best results in major championships
- Masters Tournament: DNP
- PGA Championship: DNP
- U.S. Open: DNP
- The Open Championship: T17: 1955

Dennis Frederick George Smalldon (1926 – 12 September 1959) was a Welsh professional golfer. He was killed in a road traffic accident at the age of 33. Smalldon won the Welsh Professional Championship in 1953, 1956 and 1959 and had won the Sherwood Forest Foursomes Tournament, partnered by Dai Rees, a week before the accident. He had excellent starts to both the 1955 and 1956 Open Championships but faded on both occasions. He twice represented Wales in the Canada Cup.

== Early life ==
Smalldon was born in North Devon in 1926, the son of Bill Smalldon (1897–1973), a professional golfer.

== Golfing career ==
Smalldon finished in second place in the 1950 PGA Assistants' Championship, 7 shots behind the winner, Harry Weetman. Weetman finished with a hole-in-one at the final hole. He also finished tied for second in the 1950 Welsh Professional Championship, 6 shots behind Gwyn James.

Smalldon won his first Welsh Professional Championship in 1953 at Tenby, beating Finlay Morrison by 1 stroke. He tied with Harry Gould in the 1954 Welsh Professional Championship at Holyhead but lost by 5 strokes in the 36-hole playoff.

Smalldon and Harry Gould represented Wales in the Canada Cup in Washington, D.C. in June 1955. In the 1955 Open Championship, on the Old Course at St Andrews, Smalldon started with 70, a shot behind the leaders. After a second round 69 he was in a three-way tie for the lead. A third-round 78 dropped him down the leaderboard and he eventually finished tied for 17th place after a final 73.

In March 1956 Smalldon and his partner Graham Knipe won the Sunningdale Foursomes. Smalldon won the Welsh Professional Championship for the second time. He again represented Wales in the Canada Cup, this time played at Wentworth. Smalldon and Rees were in third place but Smalldon had a poor last day and the pair finished in sixth place. In the 1956 Open Championship Smalldon only just qualified, scoring 152 for the two rounds. He then scored 68 in the first round to lead the field on his own. A second round of 79 dropped him down to 7th and further rounds of 78 and 78 left him tied for 28th place. He won the Tooting Bec Cup for his first round 68.

After two unsuccessful seasons, Smalldon showed a return to form in 1959. In June he won his third Welsh Professional Championship, beating Harry Gould by 3 strokes at Newport. The following day he led the Welsh section qualifying for the British PGA Matchplay Championship, 6 shots ahead of the field. In late August he and his partner, Dai Rees, won the Sherwood Forest Foursomes Tournament.

== Death ==
Smalldon was severely injured in a road traffic accident on 6 September 1959. He was driving a car, in which Richard Kemp and Neil Morris were passengers, which was in collision with another car at St Owen's Cross, Hentland near Ross-on-Wye, Herefordshire. A married couple in the other car were killed. Smalldon died a week later in Hereford General Hospital, not having regained consciousness. Smalldon, Kemp and Morris were the three qualifiers from the Welsh section of the PGA and were travelling to play in the final knock-out stage of the British PGA Matchplay Championship at Royal Birkdale Golf Club near Southport which started on 9 September. Morris withdrew from the event while Kemp played but lost his first match.

== Tournament wins ==
- 1953 Welsh Professional Championship
- 1956 Sunningdale Foursomes (with Graham Knipe), Welsh Professional Championship
- 1959 Welsh Professional Championship, Sherwood Forest Foursomes Tournament (with Dai Rees)

== Results in major championships ==
Tournament	1950	1951	1952	1953	1954	1955	1956	1957
The Open Championship	CUT		CUT			T17	T28	CUT

Note: Smalldon only played in The Open Championship.

Did not play

CUT = missed the half-way cut
"T" indicates a tie for a place

== Team appearances ==
- Canada Cup (representing Wales): 1955, 1956
