= John Jacobs (English golfer) =

English professional golfer

John Jacobs OBE
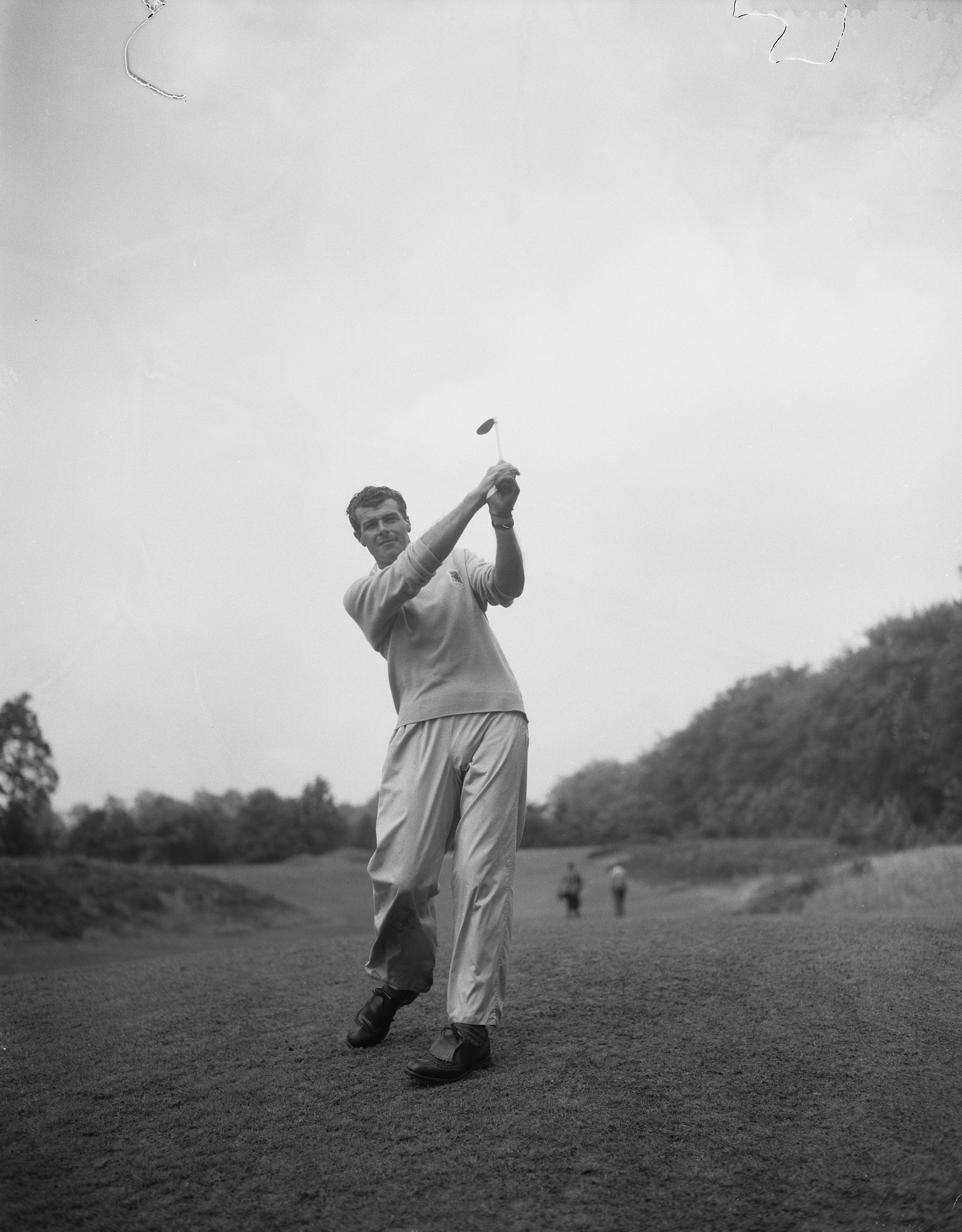
- Jacobs at the 1957 Dutch Open

Personal information
- Full name: John Robert Maurice Jacobs OBE
- Nationality: England
- Born: 14 March 1925 Woodsetts, Yorkshire, England
- Died: 13 January 2017 (aged 91)
- Spouse: Rita (died 2006)
- Children: Joanna, Jonathan

Career
- Sport: Golf
- Status: Professional
- Former tour: European Tour
- Professional wins: 2

Best results in major championships
- Masters Tournament: DNP
- PGA Championship: DNP
- U.S. Open: DNP
- The Open Championship: T12: 1955

Achievements and awards
- World Golf Hall of Fame: 2000 (member page)
- Officer of the Most Excellent Order of the British Empire: 1997

John Robert Maurice Jacobs, OBE (14 March 1925 – 13 January 2017) was an English professional golfer, coach, entrepreneur, writer and administrator. He was inducted into the World Golf Hall of Fame in 2000.

== Early life ==
Jacobs was born in Woodsetts, Yorkshire, the son of Robert "Bob" Jacobs (1880–1934), the professional at Lindrick Golf Club. Robert was born in Brancaster, Norfolk, and had become an assistant professional at the nearby Royal West Norfolk Golf Club. Robert had been the professional at Lindrick since 1919, having been at Bungay & Waveney Golf Club in Norfolk and Bedford Golf Club before World War I. During the war Robert served in the 24th Battalion Royal Fusiliers, the 2nd Sportsman's Battalion. He was badly gassed during the war, never fully recovered and committed suicide in December 1934 when Jacobs was nine years old. Jacobs's mother Vivian was the stewardess at Lindrick. Robert was replaced at Lindrick by his nephew John Archibald "Jack" Jacobs (1907–1999) who had been his assistant. Jack was a useful player who had finished as high as 16th in the 1935 Open Championship and was twice runner-up in the PGA Seniors Championship (1958 and 1959).

Jacobs joined the Royal Air Force during World War II, although he did not go into active service.

== Professional career ==
Jacobs turned professional after the end of the war, an assistant to his cousin Jack. He was demobilised from the RAF in 1947, taking his first paid position as an assistant at Hallamshire Golf Club, near Sheffield, soon afterwards. Jacobs was runner-up in the 1948 Yorkshire Professional Championship at Oakdale. After being tied with John Fallon after 36 holes, Jacobs lost the 18-hole playoff by 2 strokes.

In 1949 Jacobs became the professional at Gezira Sporting Club in Cairo, Egypt. He was there until early in 1952 when he left during the early stages of the Egyptian revolution of 1952. Jacobs spent the summer of 1951 in England and qualified for the Open Championship for the first time, although he missed the cut. Jacobs spent 1952 playing as an unattached professional before becoming the professional at Sandy Lodge Golf Club near Watford later in the year. He was at Sandy Lodge until resigning and leaving in early 1964.

Jacobs had a moderately successful tournament career at home and abroad. In 1957 he won the Dunlop South African Professional Match Play Masters and the Dutch Open. His win in the South African Professional Match Play was in March, at Houghton Golf Club in Johannesburg. Jacobs beat Gary Player 2&1 in the 36-hole final, winning the first prize of £200. Jacobs had beaten an in-form Harold Henning in the semi-final. In August he won the Dutch Open at Hilversumsche Golf Club near Hilversum, three shots clear of Flory Van Donck. Jacobs and Van Donck were level after three rounds but a course-record 67 gave Jacobs the victory. Jacobs had a hole-in-one at the 16th hole of his second round.

Jacobs never won a big tournament in Britain but was runner-up a number of times, including being a losing finalist in the 1953 Goodwin (Sheffield) Foursomes Tournament, losing to 47-year-old Henry Cotton in the final of the 1954 Penfold Tournament, joint second in the 1960 Dunlop Masters, second in the 1963 Cox Moore Tournament and losing finalist, partnered with Joe Carr, in the 1963 Gleneagles Hotel Foursomes Tournament.

In 1955, Jacobs made his one appearance in the Ryder Cup. Qualification for seven members of the 10-man team was based on the Order of Merit after the 1955 Open Championship. The qualifying events were stroke-play tournaments played in Great Britain from the Spalding Tournament ending on 22 April to the Open Championship itself, ending on 8 July. At the time the Order of Merit was a points-based system and a series of top-20 finishes, including a tie for 12th place in the Open, left Jacobs in 7th place in the Order of Merit and earned him a place in the team. The match was played at Thunderbird Country Club, Rancho Mirage, California. Jacobs won both his matches. Partnered with John Fallon, they won their foursomes match by 1 hole. He then beat Cary Middlecoff in his singles match, again 1-up, holing a 4-foot putt on the final green.

=== Tournament director ===
Jacobs was largely responsible for the creation of the European Tour due to his coaching activities and contacts in so many European countries.

He served as Tournament Director-General of the European Tour from 1971 to 1975, a period which included the inaugural season of the modern tour in 1972. In 1979 and 1981 he was the non-playing captain of the European Ryder Cup team which was remembered for a dispute between Seve Ballesteros and the European Tour. Ballesteros had only played a handful of tournaments in Europe in the season leading up to the 1981 Ryder Cup because of a disagreement over appearance money. Jacobs wanted Ballesteros on his team and rang him in America. "Seve, I want you to come back to play in Europe. I can't guarantee you will get one of the two Ryder Cup places that are up for grabs – the organising committee can fill them as it sees fit – but I will be voting for you.". In the end, although Ballesteros did come back and Jacobs as captain voted for him, Neil Coles and Bernhard Langer voted against his inclusion.

Jacobs was also a leading golf coach, who worked with many top players, and established his own golf academies. In 1972 he set up a driving range business in the United Kingdom. He wrote several books including Practical Golf and Golf Doctor. His influence has been acknowledged by later coaches such as Butch Harmon, who stated, "John Jacobs wrote the book on coaching. There is not a teacher out here who does not owe him something."

He also designed golf courses, such as Chartridge Park Golf Club in Buckinghamshire, the Buckinghamshire in Denham and Patshull Park Hotel, Golf & Country Club in Shropshire.

Jacobs has written a number of golf instruction books. His best known is "Practical Golf", written with Ken Bowden and illustrated by Anthony Ravielli. It was first published in June 1972 and it is on a number of top 10 lists of the best golf instruction books of all time.

== Personal life ==
During his period in the RAF that he met his future wife, Rita. They were married in early 1949.

Jacobs died on 13 January 2017, aged 91.

== Awards and honors ==
- In 1997, Jacobs was bestowed the Officer of the Most Excellent Order of the British Empire
- In 2000, Jacobs was inducted into the World Golf Hall of Fame.
- Jacobs was an Honorary member of the Royal and Ancient Golf Club at St Andrews.

== Professional wins (2) ==
Date	Tournament	Winning score	Margin of victory	Runner-up
9 Mar 1957	Dunlop South African; Professional Match Play Masters	2&1 in final		(South Africa) Gary Player
11 Aug 1957	Dutch Open	73-73-71-67=284	3 strokes	(Belgium) Flory Van Donck

== Results in major championships ==
Tournament	1951	1952	1953	1954	1955	1956	1957	1958	1959	1960	1961	1962	1963	1964
The Open Championship	CUT	T27	T14	T20	T12	16	CUT	CUT	CUT	T32	T20	CUT	CUT	CUT

Note: Jacobs only played in The Open Championship.
CUT = missed the half-way cut
"T" indicates a tie for a place

== Team appearances ==
- Ryder Cup (representing Great Britain & Ireland/Europe): 1955, 1979 (non-playing captain), 1981 (non-playing captain)
- Joy Cup (representing the British Isles): 1954 (winners), 1955 (winners), 1958 (winners)
- Amateurs–Professionals Match (representing the Professionals): 1958
