= Welsh National PGA Championship =

Tournament information
- Established: 1904
- Course(s): Pyle & Kenfig (2024)
- Month played: September

Current champion
- Zach Galliford (2024)

The Welsh National PGA Championship is a golf tournament played annually in Wales since 1904. For many years the event was called the Welsh Professional Championship. Currently entry is restricted to professionals employed by a Welsh club and those born in Wales or with a parent or grandparent born in Wales. 2016 was the 100th edition of the event and was won by Lydia Hall after a final round 67.

== History ==
The first Championship was held at Radyr Golf Club on 15 July 1904. It was a 36-hole stroke-play event played on a single day. There were 19 entries. Tom Brace led after a 79 in the morning but fell away after an afternoon 92. The winner was the Tenby professional, Arthur Day, who had rounds of 81 and 80 for a total of 161. This put him three strokes ahead of the joint runners-up, 20-year-old George Duncan and Bill Leaver, who had finished 8th in the 1903 Open Championship. The winner received 10 guineas and a gold medal.

The 1905 Championship was held at Conwy Golf Club on 23 August 1905. There were 15 entries. The winner also received entry to the final stage of the News of the World Matchplay. The winner was the Llandudno professional Fred Collins on 153. Collins finished two shots ahead of George Duncan. However, Duncan had moved to Timperley and was only trying to qualify for the News of the World Matchplay, not being eligible for the Welsh Championship. Alfred Matthews, the Rhyl professional, was runner-up in the Championship on 160. The News of the World Matchplay had started in 1903 but in the first two years the Welsh professionals had had to play in the Northern or Midland sections qualifying events.

In 1971 the event was held as part of the Welsh Professional Open Championship. Don Gammon won the open event with a score of 278, a stroke ahead of Stuart Brown. Two golfers tied for the closed event, Jimmy Buckley and Kim Dabson both scoring 291. Buckley won a sudden-death playoff at the second extra hole.

== Winners ==
Year	Winner	Country	Venue	Score
2024	Zach Galliford	Wales	Pyle & Kenfig	141
2023	Toby Hunt (2)	Wales	Machynys Peninsula	132
2022	Sion Bebb (4)	Wales	Machynys Peninsula	137
2021	Lee Rooke	Wales	Aberdovey	136
2020	Tim Dykes	Wales	Cardiff	138
2019	Mark Pilkington	Wales	Conwy	142
2018	Toby Hunt	Wales	Ashburnham	136
2017	Sion Bebb (3)	Wales	Celtic Manor (Roman)	131
2016	Lydia Hall	Wales	Tenby	138
2015	Garry Houston	Wales	Radyr	137
2014	Stephen Dodd (5)	Wales	Royal St David's	134
2013	Lee Rooke	Wales	Royal St David's	135
2012	Stuart Manley	Wales	Cardiff	135
2011	Stephen Dodd (4)	Wales	Southerndown	136 +++
2010	Simon Edwards (3)	Wales	Royal St David's	204
2009	Jason Powell	Wales	Ashburnham	221
2008	Trevor Jones	Wales	Cardiff	209
2007	Stephen Dodd (3)	Wales	Cardiff	200
2006	Sion Bebb (2)	Wales	Tenby	204
2005	Sion Bebb	Wales	Southerndown	199
2004	Mark Plummer (3)	Wales	Vale of Llangollen	203
2003	Simon Edwards (2)	Wales	Porthmadog	196
2002	Simon Edwards	Wales	Pyle & Kenfig	210
2001	Stephen Dodd (2)	Wales	Ashburnham	214
2000	Mark Plummer (2)	Wales	Newport	136
1999	Richard Dinsdale	Wales	Vale of Glamorgan	134
1998	Liam Bond	Wales	Vale of Glamorgan	69 ++
1997	Matthew Ellis	Wales	Vale of Glamorgan	139
1996	Matt Stanford	England	Northop Country Park	137
1995	Stephen Dodd	Wales	Northop Country Park	139
1994	Mark Plummer	Wales	Northop Country Park	133
1993	Phillip Price	Wales	Mountain Lakes	138
1992	Chris Evans	Wales	Ashburnham	142
1991	Paul Mayo (2)	Wales	Fairwood Park	138
1990	Paul Mayo	Wales	Fairwood Park	136
1989	Kevin Jones (2)	Wales	Royal Porthcawl	140
1988	Ian Woosnam	Wales	Cardiff	137
1987	Andrew Dodman	England	Cardiff	132
1986	Philip Parkin	Wales	Whitchurch	142
1985	David Llewellyn	Wales	Whitchurch	132
1984	Kevin Jones	Wales	Cardiff	135
1983	Simon Cox (2)	Wales	Cardiff	136
1982	Craig Defoy (4)	Wales	Cardiff	137
1981	Craig Defoy (3)	Wales	Cardiff	139
1980	Andy Griffiths (2)	Wales	Cardiff	139
1979: Event cancelled
1978	Brian Huggett	Wales	Whitchurch	145
1977	Craig Defoy (2)	Wales	Glamorganshire	135
1976	Simon Cox	Wales	Radyr	284
1975	Craig Defoy	Wales	Whitchurch	285
1974	Mel Hughes	England	Cardiff	284
1973	Andy Griffiths	Wales	Newport	289
1972	Jimmy Buckley (2)	Wales	Royal Porthcawl	298
1971	Jimmy Buckley	Wales	St Pierre	291
1970	William Evans	Wales	Tredegar Park	289
1969	Sid Mouland (6)	Wales	Llandudno	277
1968	Richard Davies	Wales	Southerndown	292
1967	Sid Mouland (5)	Wales	Pyle & Kenfig	219 +
1966	Sid Mouland (4)	Wales	Conwy	281
1965	Sid Mouland (3)	Wales	Penarth	281
1964	B Bielby	Wales	Tenby	297
1963	Harry Gould (6)	Wales	Wrexham	291
1962	Sid Mouland (2)	Wales	Royal Porthcawl	302
1961	Sid Mouland	Wales	Southerndown	286
1960	Dick Kemp (2)	Wales	Llandudno	288
1959	Dennis Smalldon (3)	Wales	Newport	
1958	Dick Kemp	Wales	Radyr	
1957	Jimmy Black (2)	Wales	Llandudno	
1956	Dennis Smalldon (2)	Wales	Royal Porthcawl	
1955	Jimmy Black	Wales	Penarth	291
1954	Harry Gould (5)	Wales	Holyhead	293
1953	Dennis Smalldon	Wales	Tenby	291
1952	Sid Collins Jr. (2)	England	Southerndown	
1951	Harry Gould (4)	Wales	Llandudno	
1950	Gwyn James	Wales	Newport	
1949	Harry Gould (3)	Wales	Radyr	
1948	Harry Gould (2)	Wales	Aberdovey	
1947	Ken Williams	Wales	Llandrindod	
1946	Harry Gould	Wales	Royal Porthcawl	
1940–45: No tournament due to World War II
1939	Chris Grabham	Wales	Harlech	
1938	Sid Collins Jr.	England	St Mellons	
1937	Frank Hill (2)	Wales	Clyne	
1936	Fred Lloyd	Wales	Prestatyn	
1935	Frank Hill	Wales	Penarth	
1934	Charles Pickett	Wales	Swansea Bay	
1933	Fred Collins (2)	England	Rhyl	305
1932	Bill Smalldon	Wales	Royal Porthcawl	
1931	R Watts	Wales	Newport	
1930	Harold Palferman	Wales	Wrexham	
1929	Bert Hodson (2)	Wales	Royal Porthcawl	
1928	Robert Walker	Wales	Llandudno	
1927	Bert Hodson	Wales	Tenby	
1926	Bert Weastell (2)	England	Llandudno	
1925	James Horn	England	Pennard	
1924	Bert Weastell	England	Llandudno	
1923	Jack Milner	England	Royal Porthcawl	
1922	Gus Faulkner	England	Rhos on Sea	
1921	Percy Alliss (2)	England	Southerndown	
1920	Percy Alliss	England	Aberdovey	
1914–19: No tournament due to World War I
1913	George Gadd	England	Chester	
1912	Cyril Hughes	England	Royal Porthcawl	
1911	Peter Rainford	England	Conwy	
1910	Alfred Matthews (2)	England	Swansea	
1909	Alfred Matthews	England	Rhyl	
1908	Tom Brace	Wales	Bridgend	
1907	Sam Whiting	England	Porthcawl	
1906	Jack Ross	Scotland	Radyr	156
1905	Fred Collins	England	Conwy	153
1904	Arthur Day	England	Radyr	161

- + reduced to 54 holes.
- ++ reduced to 18 holes.
- +++ reduced to 36 holes.
