= 1955 Open Championship =

Coordinates: 56.343°N 2.803°W

Tournament information
- Dates: 6–8 July 1955
- Location: St Andrews, Scotland
- Course: Old Course at St Andrews

Statistics
- Par: 72
- Length: 6,936 yards (6,342 m)
- Field: 94 players, 49 after cut
- Cut: 148 (+4)
- Prize fund: £3,750 $10,500
- Winner's share: £1,000 $2,800

Champion
- (Australia) Peter Thomson
- 281 (−7)

Location in Scotland
Location in Fife, Scotland

The 1955 Open Championship was the 84th Open Championship, played 6–8 July at the Old Course in St Andrews, Scotland. Peter Thomson won the second of three consecutive Open titles, two strokes ahead of runner-up John Fallon. Thomson won a total of five Claret Jugs, the last in 1965.

Qualifying took place on 4–5 July, Monday and Tuesday, with 18 holes on the Old Course and 18 holes on the New Course. The number of qualifiers was limited to a maximum of 100, and ties for 100th place did not qualify. On Monday, Frank Jowle scored 63 on the New Course, and after a 72 on the Old Course the next day he led the qualifiers at 135, a shot ahead of Laurie Ayton. The qualifying score was 148 and 94 players advanced to the first round on Wednesday.

Three shot 69 in the opening round on Wednesday; after the second round on Thursday, three shared the 36-hole lead at 139: Eric Brown, Dennis Smalldon, and Thomson, with Fallon a stroke back in fourth. The maximum number of players making the cut was set at fifty, and ties for 50th place were not included. Five Americans were in the field of 94, three professionals and two amateurs. All five made the cut, and the top U.S. finisher was Ed Furgol in a tie for 19th place. Byron Nelson, whose only previous appearance at The Open was a fifth-place finish in 1937, tied for 32nd. The two amateurs finished in the top thirty.

Previously the 17th hole (the "Road Hole") was a par 5; for this Open it became a par 4, which reduced the course par from 73 to 72.

The winner's share was increased from £750 to £1,000, while the others were unchanged, bringing the total purse to £3,750.

== Round summaries ==
=== First round ===
Wednesday, 6 July 1955

Place	Player	Score	To par
T1	(Scotland) Eric Brown	69	−3
T1	(Wales) Dai Rees	69	−3
T1	(England) Syd Scott	69	−3
T4	(England) Henry Cotton	70	−2
T4	(England) Cecil Denny	70	−2
T4	(England) Bernard Hunt	70	−2
T4	(England) Frank Jowle	70	−2
T4	(Scotland) Ian Martin	70	−2
T4	(Wales) Dennis Smalldon	70	−2
T10	(Scotland) John Anderson	71	−1
T10	(Argentina) Romualdo Barbieri	71	−1
T10	(England) Ken Bousfield	71	−1
T10	(United States) Ed Furgol	71	−1
T10	(England) Robert Halsall	71	−1
T10	(England) John Jacobs	71	−1
T10	(Republic of Ireland) Christy O'Connor Snr	71	−1
T10	(England) Norman Sutton	71	−1
T10	(Australia) Peter Thomson	71	−1
T10	(Belgium) Flory Van Donck	71	−1
T10	(England) Harry Weetman	71	−1

=== Second round ===
Thursday, 7 July 1955

Place	Player	Score	To par
T1	(Scotland) Eric Brown	69-70=139	−5
T1	(Wales) Dennis Smalldon	70-69=139	−5
T1	(Australia) Peter Thomson	71-68=139	−5
4	(Scotland) John Fallon	73-67=140	−4
T5	(England) Bernard Hunt	70-71=141	−3
T5	(England) John Jacobs	71-70=141	−3
T5	(England) Frank Jowle	70-71=141	−3
T8	(Argentina) Romualdo Barbieri	71-71=142	−2
T8	(Republic of Ireland) Harry Bradshaw	72-70=142	−2
T8	(England) Henry Cotton	70-72=142	−2
T8	(Scotland) Ian Martin	70-72=142	−2
T8	(England) Harry Weetman	71-71=142	−2

Amateurs: Bucher (+2), Conrad (+4), McHale (+4), Lawrie (+5), Carr (+9), Murray (+11), Orr (+13), Robertson (+15)

=== Third round ===
Friday, 8 July 1955 (morning)

Place	Player	Score	To par
1	(Australia) Peter Thomson	71-68-70=209	−7
2	(England) Frank Jowle	70-71-69=210	−6
T3	(Scotland) Eric Brown	69-70-73=212	−4
T3	(England) John Jacobs	71-70-71=212	−4
T3	(England) Harry Weetman	71-71-70=212	−4
T6	(Scotland) John Fallon	73-67-73=213	−3
T6	(South Africa) Bobby Locke	74-69-70=213	−3
8	(Belgium) Flory Van Donck	71-72-71=214	−2
T9	(Argentina) Romualdo Barbieri	71-71-73=215	−1
T9	(Republic of Ireland) Harry Bradshaw	72-70-73=215	−1
T9	(Argentina) Antonio Cerdá	73-71-71=215	−1
T9	(England) Bernard Hunt	70-71-74=215	−1

=== Final round ===
Friday, 8 July 1955 (afternoon)

Place	Player	Score	To par	Money (£)
1	(Australia) Peter Thomson	71-68-70-72=281	−7	1,000
2	(Scotland) John Fallon	73-67-73-70=283	−5	500
3	(England) Frank Jowle	70-71-69-74=284	−4	350
4	(South Africa) Bobby Locke	74-69-70-72=285	−3	200
T5	(England) Ken Bousfield	71-75-70-70=286	−2	90
T5	(Argentina) Antonio Cerdá	73-71-71-71=286	−2	90
T5	(England) Bernard Hunt	70-71-74-71=286	−2	90
T5	(Belgium) Flory Van Donck	71-72-71-72=286	−2	90
T5	(England) Harry Weetman	71-71-70-74=286	−2	90
T10	(Argentina) Romualdo Barbieri	71-71-73-72=287	−1	40
T10	(Republic of Ireland) Christy O'Connor Snr	71-75-70-71=287	−1	40

Amateurs: Conrad (+5), McHale (+7), Bucher (+23).
