= Sion Bebb =

Welsh golfer

Personal information
- Full name: Sion Emrys Bebb
- Nationality: Wales
- Born: 3 October 1968 (age 58) Church Village, Wales
- Height: 6 ft 0 in (1.83 m)
- Spouse: Rita (m. 1996)
- Children: 2

Career
- Sport: Golf
- Turned professional: 1986
- Former tours: European Tour; Challenge Tour
- Professional wins: 7

Number of wins by tour
- Challenge Tour: 1
- Other: 6

Sion Emrys Bebb (born 3 October 1968) is a Welsh professional golfer.

== Early life ==
Bebb was born in Church Village, Mid Glamorgan, and is the son of former Welsh international rugby player Dewi Bebb.

== Professional career ==
In 1986, Bebb turned professional. He worked for many years as a club professional before forging a tournament career. He has struggled to establish himself on the top level European Tour and has visited qualifying school many times, successfully regaining his card in 2006 and 2007.

Bebb first gained his card on the European Tour through the 2006 qualifying school, having spent many years on the second-tier Challenge Tour. He claimed his first win at the 2006 Ryder Cup Wales Challenge.

== Personal life ==
In 2006, his wife gave birth to their second child.

== Professional wins (7) ==
=== Challenge Tour wins (1) ===
No.	Date	Tournament	Winning score	Margin of victory	Runner-up
1	30 Jul 2006	Ryder Cup Wales Challenge	−10 (68-64-73-69=274)	1 stroke	(France) Jean-Baptiste Gonnet

=== Other wins (6) ===
- 1999 Glenmuir Club Professional Championship, European Club Professional Championship
- 2005 Welsh PGA Championship
- 2006 Welsh PGA Championship
- 2017 Welsh PGA Championship
- 2022 Welsh PGA Championship

== Team appearances ==
Professional

- PGA Cup: 2000

== See also ==
- 2006 European Tour Qualifying School graduates
- 2007 European Tour Qualifying School graduates
- 2009 Challenge Tour graduates
