= 1957 Ryder Cup =

Golf tournament in England

12th Ryder Cup Matches
- Dates: 4–5 October 1957
- Venue: Lindrick Golf Club
- Location: Worksop, England
- Captains: Dai Rees (Great Britain); Jack Burke Jr. (USA)
(United Kingdom)	7 1/2	4 1/2	(United States)
- Great Britain wins the Ryder Cup

Location map
- Location within England

The 12th Ryder Cup Matches were held 4–5 October 1957 at Lindrick Golf Club near Worksop, England. The Great Britain team, led by captain Dai Rees, beat the United States team by a score of 7 1/2 to 4 1/2 points, and won the Ryder Cup for the first time since 1933.

On the first day of competition was the Americans dominated the foursomes, winning three of the four matches. Dick Mayer and Tommy Bolt's 7 & 5 win over Britain's Christy O'Connor and Eric Brown was the largest margin of victory on day one.

The British rallied on the second day of competition, starting with the first two singles matches. Brown recorded a 4 & 3 victory over Bolt, and Peter Mills defeated U.S. captain Jack Burke Jr. to draw Britain level at 3 to 3. The Americans responded when Fred Hawkins won his match against Peter Alliss, however Britain won the next four matches. Great Britain won the Ryder Cup when O'Connor defeated Dow Finsterwald, giving the British team 7 points. Harry Bradshaw and Mayer halved the final singles match to bring the final score to 7 1/2 to 4 1/2, with Britain gaining 6 1/2 points in the eight singles matches.

Dai Rees therefore became only the third - and final - captain of the Great Britain side to lift the Ryder Cup as winning captain. Great Britain would never win the Ryder Cup again, and the Great Britain & Ireland team that competed in 1973, 1975 and 1977 never won the cup. It would not be until 1985 that a non-American (Tony Jacklin, as captain of the Europe team) would lift the trophy.

== Format ==
The Ryder Cup is a match play event, with each match worth one point. From 1927 through 1959, the format consisted of 4 foursome (alternate shot) matches on the first day and 8 singles matches on the second day, for a total of 12 points. Therefore, 6 1/2 points were required to win the Cup. All matches were played to a maximum of 36 holes.

== Sir Stuart Goodwin ==
The event was supported by Sir Stuart Goodwin. He offered the P.G.A. £10,000 to host the match at Lindrick, the gate money going to the P.G.A. who were responsible for all payments in connection with the match. With gate receipts of £16,127 the £10,000 donation enabled the P.G.A. to make a record profit of about £11,000 out of the event.

== Teams ==
A new system of selection was used for the Great Britain team. A points system based on performances over a two-year period ending after the 1957 Open Championship was used. Winners of the 1957 Open Championship and the 1957 News of the World Match Play were guaranteed places provided they were British. The remaining places to complete the team of 10 were selected from the points list. Following the 1957 Open, nine places were finalised, the leading nine in the point list: Brown, Weetman, Bradshaw, Bousfield, Alliss, Rees, Faulkner, O'Connor and Hunt. Mills was 10th in the list. Rees was again chosen as the captain. With O'Connor winning the News of the World Match Play, Mills became the last member of the team.

The 1957 Amateurs–Professionals Match was played at Lindrick in early August. It was intended that the match would be between the Ryder Cup and Walker Cup teams, to give both teams some competitive experience and for the Ryder Cup team to gain experience of the Lindrick course. In the event, two of the Ryder Cup team, Christy O'Connor Snr and Harry Weetman were ill and replaced by Eric Lester and local professional, 49-year-old Jack Jacobs.

Team Great Britain
Name	Age	Previous Ryder Cups	Matches	W–L–H	Winning percentage
(Wales) Dai Rees – captain	44	6	10	2–7–1	25.00
(England) Peter Alliss	26	1	2	0–2–0	0.00
(England) Ken Bousfield	38	3	2	1–1–0	50.00
(Republic of Ireland) Harry Bradshaw	43	2	4	2–2–0	50.00
(Scotland) Eric Brown	32	2	4	2–2–0	50.00
(England) Max Faulkner	41	4	7	1–6–0	14.29
(England) Bernard Hunt	27	1	2	0–1–1	25.00
(England) Peter Mills	26	0	Rookie
(Republic of Ireland) Christy O'Connor Snr	32	1	1	0–1–0	0.00
(England) Harry Weetman	36	3	5	1–4–0	20.00

Team USA
Name	Age	Previous Ryder Cups	Matches	W–L–H	Winning percentage
Jack Burke Jr. – captain	34	3	6	6–0–0	100.00
Tommy Bolt	41	1	2	2–0–0	100.00
Dow Finsterwald	28	0	Rookie
Doug Ford	35	1	2	2–0–0	100.00
Ed Furgol	40	0	Rookie
Fred Hawkins	34	0	Rookie
Lionel Hebert	29	0	Rookie
Ted Kroll	38	2	3	2–1–0	66.67
Dick Mayer	33	0	Rookie
Art Wall Jr.	33	0	Rookie

- Notables absent from the U.S. team included Sam Snead, Jimmy Demaret, and Cary Middlecoff; Ben Hogan last played in 1951.

== Friday's foursome matches ==
	Results
Alliss/Hunt	(United States) 2 & 1	Ford/Finsterwald
Bousfield/Rees	(United Kingdom) 3 & 2	Wall/Hawkins
Faulkner/Weetman	(United States) 4 & 3	Kroll/Burke
O'Connor/Brown	(United States) 7 & 5	Mayer/Bolt
1	Session	3
1	Overall	3

18 hole scores: Ford/Finsterwald: 1 up, Bousfield/Rees v Wall/Hawkins: all square, Kroll/Burke: 1 up, Mayer/Bolt: 3 up.

== Saturday's singles matches ==
	Results
Eric Brown	(United Kingdom) 4 & 3	Tommy Bolt
Peter Mills	(United Kingdom) 5 & 3	Jack Burke Jr.
Peter Alliss	(United States) 2 & 1	Fred Hawkins
Ken Bousfield	(United Kingdom) 4 & 3	Lionel Hebert
Dai Rees	(United Kingdom) 7 & 6	Ed Furgol
Bernard Hunt	(United Kingdom) 6 & 5	Doug Ford
Christy O'Connor	(United Kingdom) 7 & 6	Dow Finsterwald
Harry Bradshaw	halved	Dick Mayer
6 1/2	Session	1 1/2
7 1/2	Overall	4 1/2

18 hole scores: Brown: 4 up, Mills: 5 up, Hawkins: 1 up, Bousfield: 5 up, Rees: 4 up, Hunt: 1 up, O'Connor/Finsterwald: all square, Mayer: 1 up.

== Individual player records ==
Each entry refers to the win–loss–half record of the player.

=== Great Britain ===
Player	Points	Overall	Singles	Foursomes
Peter Alliss	0	0–2–0	0–1–0	0–1–0
Ken Bousfield	2	2–0–0	1–0–0	1–0–0
Harry Bradshaw	0.5	0–0–1	0–0–1	0–0–0
Eric Brown	1	1–1–0	1–0–0	0–1–0
Max Faulkner	0	0–1–0	0–0–0	0–1–0
Bernard Hunt	1	1–1–0	1–0–0	0–1–0
Peter Mills	1	1–0–0	1–0–0	0–0–0
Christy O'Connor	1	1–1–0	1–0–0	0–1–0
Dai Rees	2	2–0–0	1–0–0	1–0–0
Harry Weetman	0	0–1–0	0–0–0	0–1–0

=== United States ===
Player	Points	Overall	Singles	Foursomes
Tommy Bolt	1	1–1–0	0–1–0	1–0–0
Jack Burke Jr.	1	1–1–0	0–1–0	1–0–0
Dow Finsterwald	1	1–1–0	0–1–0	1–0–0
Doug Ford	1	1–1–0	0–1–0	1–0–0
Ed Furgol	0	0–1–0	0–1–0	0–0–0
Fred Hawkins	1	1–1–0	1–0–0	0–1–0
Lionel Hebert	0	0–1–0	0–1–0	0–0–0
Ted Kroll	1	1–0–0	0–0–0	1–0–0
Dick Mayer	1.5	1–0–1	0–0–1	1–0–0
Art Wall Jr.	0	0–1–0	0–0–0	0–1–0

== Weetman suspension ==
At a meeting on 21 October, Harry Weetman was suspended by the executive committee of the P.G.A. for twelve months. This was following his actions after being left out of the second day singles matches. Weetman had declared that he would never play in any Ryder Cup again if Rees were the captain. Weetman was unable to play in P.G.A. events. The decision was upheld at the annual meeting of the P.G.A. in November. Following an appeal from Rees the P.G.A. lifted the suspension on 17 April 1958.

== Ryder Cup Reunion Foursomes Tournament ==
In 1964, Stuart Goodwin sponsored a £1,000 Ryder Cup Reunion Foursomes tournament at Hallamshire Golf Club. Each member of the successful Britain and Ireland team from the 1957 Ryder Cup was paired with a Yorkshire or Nottinghamshire professional in the 72-hole foursomes event, played over two days. Christy O'Connor was ill and was replaced by a local professional. Ken Bousfield and Alex Caygill won the event with a score of 292, two ahead of three couples on 294.
