= Goodwin (Sheffield) Foursomes Tournament =

Tournament information
- Location: Sheffield, England
- Established: 1952
- Month played: September
- Final year: 1954

Final champion
- Sidney Collins, Jr. and Bernard Hunt

Location in England

The Goodwin (Sheffield) Foursomes Tournament was a professional golf tournament played in the Sheffield area of England. The event was held from 1952 to 1954 and had total prize money of £3,000. The winning finalists shared £500 with £300 to the runners-up. The event was sponsored by Sir Stuart Goodwin, a Yorkshire steel industrialist.

A total of 64 players qualified for the final stage through a regional system of 36-hole individual stroke-play. These 64 were drawn into 32 pairs for the final knockout stage. There were four rounds of 18-hole match-play foursomes, followed by a 36-hole final on the third day.

== Winners ==
Year	Winners	Country	Venue	Margin of victory	Runners-up	Winner's share (£)	Ref
1952	John Panton & Norman Roffe	Scotland; England	Abbeydale Golf Club	6 & 5	(England) Dick Kemp, Sr. & (England) Alan Poulton	500 (pair)	
1953	Jack Hargreaves & Bernard Hunt	England; England	Lindrick Golf Club	5 & 4	(England) Trevor Allen & (England) John Jacobs	500 (pair)	
1954	Sid Collins Jr. & Bernard Hunt	England; England	Rotherham Golf Club	2 & 1	(Scotland) John Fallon & (England) Wally Smithers	500 (pair)	
