= David Talbot (golfer) =

English golfer

Personal information
- Full name: David Talbot
- Nationality: England
- Born: 16 November 1936 (age 89) Yorkshire, England
- Height: 6 ft 1 in (1.85 m)
- Weight: 185 lb (84 kg; 13.2 st)

Career
- Sport: Golf
- Turned professional: 1952
- Former tour: European Tour
- Professional wins: 7

Best results in major championships
- Masters Tournament: DNP
- PGA Championship: DNP
- U.S. Open: DNP
- The Open Championship: T40: 1965

David Talbot (born 16 November 1936) is an English professional golfer. He is remembered for winning the Schweppes PGA Championship at Dunbar in 1968, taking the first prize of £1,000. Talbot started the final round five ahead of Irishman Nicky Lynch but took 40 to Lynch's 33 for the first nine holes to be two shots behind. However Talbot came home in 32 to Lynch's 40 to win by five strokes from Bernard Hunt with Lynch dropping into a tie for third place.

Talbot reached the semi-finals of the 1969 News of the World Match Play, losing to the eventual winner Maurice Bembridge. He played in the early years of the European Tour from 1972 to 1980. His best finish was to be runner-up in the 1972 Carroll's International, 4 strokes behind Christy O'Connor Snr.

Talbot was briefly at Hallamshire Golf Club, Sheffield before becoming an assistant to John Jacobs at Sandy Lodge Golf Club, Hertfordshire in 1953. Talbot became the professional at Notts Golf Club in 1960 before moving to Royal Mid-Surrey Golf Club in 1969, replacing Jimmy Adams. He was succeeded at Mid-Surrey by his son, Philip in 1999.

== Professional wins (7) ==
- 1965 Nottinghamshire Open Championship
- 1967 Nottinghamshire Open Championship
- 1968 Schweppes PGA Championship
- 1977 Sant Cugat Open (Spain)
- 3 times winner Surrey Open

== Results in major championships ==
Tournament	1958	1959	1960	1961	1962	1963	1964	1965	1966	1967	1968	1969	1970	1971	1972	1973	1974	1975	1976
The Open Championship	CUT			CUT	CUT			T40	CUT	CUT	CUT	CUT	CUT	63	T50				T55

Note: Talbot only played in The Open Championship.

Did not play

CUT = missed the half-way cut (3rd round cut in 1968 and 1970 Open Championships)
"T" indicates a tie for a place

== Team appearances ==
- PGA Cup (representing Great Britain and Ireland): 1980 (non-playing captain)
