= Woodbrook Golf Club =

Sports organisation in Shankill, Dublin, Ireland

- Crest

- Location in Ireland
- 53.216824°N 6.111826°W

Club information
- Location: Shankill, County Dublin, Republic of Ireland
- Established: 1921, 105 years ago
- Type: Private
- Tota holes: 18
- Tournaments: Irish Open (1975)
- Website: woodbrook.ie

Woodbrook
- Par: 72
- Length: 6,947 yards (6,352 m)
- Course record: Dermot Cantrell (64, 2005)

Woodbrook Golf Club is a golf club located in Shankill, Dublin, Ireland. It was established as a private club in 1921 by Sir Stanley Cochrane. Woodbook was first affiliated to the Golfing Union of Ireland (GUI) in 1926. Sir Stanley had previously indulged his enthusiasm for cricket at Woodbrook, a fact that is still reflected in the pavilion style clubhouse and the cricket bell which tolled the start and finish of play and now hangs in the bar.

Woodbrook hosted the Hennessy Tournament in 1957, the Irish Hospitals Tournament from 1958 to 1962, the Carroll Sweet Afton Tournament in 1963 and 1964 and the Carroll's International from 1967 to 1974. It was also the first host of the revived Irish Open in 1975. Woodbrook has also hosted the Irish PGA Championship on six occasions (1977, 1981, 1982, 1983, 1990 and 1991).
