= Blackwell Golf Club =

Golf club in Worcestershire, England

Coordinates: 52.34639°N 2.008638°W

Blackwell Golf Club is a golf club situated in the village of Blackwell near Bromsgrove, Worcestershire, England. It has been host to regional qualifying for The Open Championship on many occasions and is recognised as one of the best courses in the county.

== History ==
Blackwell Golf Club opened in 1893 as a nine-hole golf course on part of the Hewell Estate. In 1923, a new eighteen-hole course was designed by William Herbert Fowler and Tom Simpson. The 12th hole has an unusual feature, with a 200 yard long bunker running the length of the hole.
