= Syd Scott =

English golfer (1913–1985)

Personal information
- Full name: Sydney Simeon Scott
- Nationality: England
- Born: 20 December 1913 Brampton, Carlisle, England
- Died: 22 April 1985 (aged 71) Chobham, Surrey, England

Career
- Sport: Golf
- Turned professional: 1936
- Professional wins: 7

Best results in major championships
- Masters Tournament: CUT: 1962
- PGA Championship: DNP
- U.S. Open: DNP
- The Open Championship: T2: 1954

Sydney Simeon Scott (20 December 1913 – 22 April 1985) was an English professional golfer. He is best known for being runner-up in the 1954 Open Championship and for being a member of the British 1955 Ryder Cup team. He won the PGA Seniors Championship in 1964.

He played in the 1938 Daily Mail Tournament at Northumberland Golf Club, making the cut. His first Open Championship was in 1939 where he finished tied for 11th in the qualifying competition. Scoring 76 and 77 he missed the cut by three strokes. In late 1939, he finished second in the northern qualifying competition for the News of the World Match Play, which was subsequently cancelled.

Before World War II, he was the professional at Hartlepool Golf Club and then after the war at Carlisle Golf Club. In 1958 he moved to the Roehampton Club where he was professional until 1980 when he was succeeded by his son Alan.

== Professional wins ==
- 1950 Leeds Cup
- 1952 Leeds Cup
- 1953 Leeds Cup, Dunbar Open Tournament
- 1954 Dunbar Open Tournament
- 1955 Leeds Cup
- 1964 PGA Seniors Championship

== Results in major championships ==
Tournament	1939	1940	1941	1942	1943	1944	1945	1946	1947	1948	1949
Masters Tournament					NT	NT	NT				
The Open Championship	CUT	NT	NT	NT	NT	NT	NT	CUT	CUT		CUT

Tournament	1950	1951	1952	1953	1954	1955	1956	1957	1958	1959
Masters Tournament										
The Open Championship	32		T9	T22	T2	T19	T28	T39	T34	4

Tournament	1960	1961	1962	1963	1964	1965	1966	1967	1968
Masters Tournament			CUT						
The Open Championship	T9	T10	10	CUT	T19	CUT		CUT	CUT

Note: Scott only played in the Masters Tournament and The Open Championship.

Top 10
Did not play

NT = No tournament
CUT = missed the half-way cut
"T" indicates a tie for a place

== Team appearances ==
- Ryder Cup (representing Great Britain): 1955
- Joy Cup (representing the British Isles): 1954 (winners), 1955 (winners), 1956 (winners)
- Slazenger Trophy (representing Great Britain and Ireland): 1956 (winners)
- Amateurs–Professionals Match (representing the Professionals): 1956 (winners), 1960 (winners)
