= Sherwood Forest Foursomes Tournament =

Tournament information
- Location: Mansfield, Nottinghamshire, England
- Established: 1959
- Course: Sherwood Forest Golf Club
- Month played: August
- Final year: 1959

Final champion
- Dai Rees and Dennis Smalldon

Location in England

The Sherwood Forest Foursomes Tournament was a professional golf tournament played at Sherwood Forest Golf Club near Mansfield, Nottinghamshire in England. The event was held just once, on 28 and 29 August 1959, and had total prize money of £2,100. The event was sponsored by Sir Stuart Goodwin, a Yorkshire steel industrialist.

A total of 48 players qualified for the final stage through a regional system of 36-hole individual stroke-play. These 48 were drawn into 24 pairs for the final stage. There were four rounds of stroke-play.

Dennis Smalldon, one of the winning pair, died two weeks later after being injured in a road-traffic accident on 6 September.

== Winners ==
Year	Winners	Country	Score	Margin of victory	Runner-up	Winner's share (£)	Ref
1959	Dai Rees & Dennis Smalldon	Wales; Wales	285	3 strokes	(Republic of Ireland) Christy O'Connor Snr & (England) Alan Poulton	150 (each)	
