= Radyr Golf Club =

Golf club in Cardiff, Wales

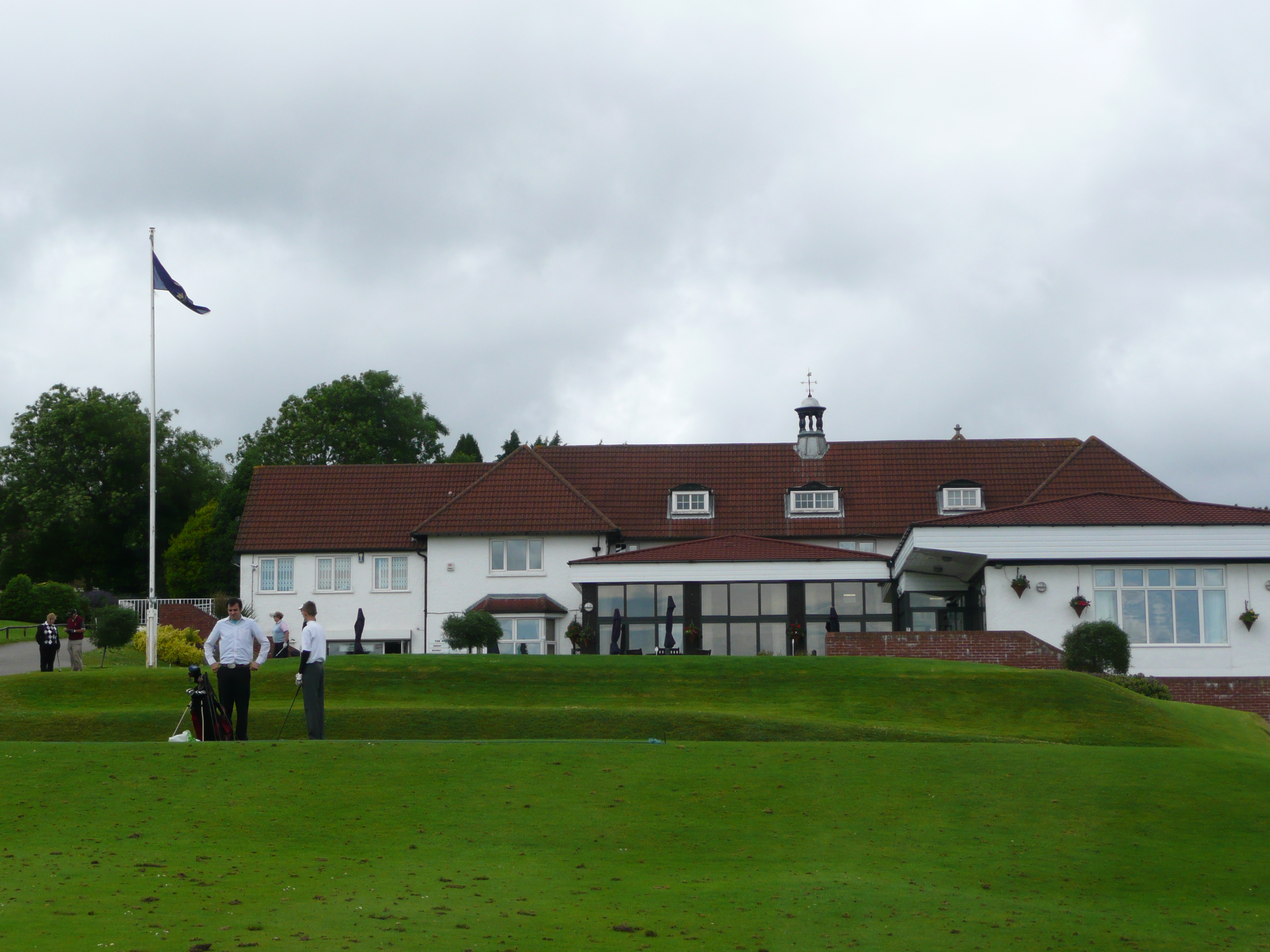
- Radyr Golf Club

- Location in Cardiff
- 51°30′51″N 3°15′50″W

Club information
- Location: Radyr, Cardiff, Wales
- Established: 1902
- Type: Private
- Owner: Members Club
- Total holes: 18
- Website: www.radyrgolf.co.uk

Radyr Golf Club is a golf course in Radyr, northwestern Cardiff, Wales. It is the oldest existing golf club in Cardiff, established on 29 November 1902, following the breakup of Lisvane Golf Club, the preceding year. (Note: The Lisvane Golf Club was reorganised in 1905.)

== History ==
In 1904 the club hosted the inaugural Welsh Professional Championship. In 1912 the parkland course was redesigned by Harry Colt, who overlooked further changes nine years later. In 1913, a fire gutted the original clubhouse, and was replaced by a building which still exists. In 1920 Rupert Phillips and Raymond Thomas played at the course. The golfers were bet that they could not play through from Radyr in Cardiff to the golf club at Southerndown, a distance of 20 miles. It took 608 strokes and 20 lost balls as well as being chased by a bull before they were able to collect the bet.

It has hosted the PGA Welsh National Championship six times as of April 2016, the last of which was in July 2015.

== Course ==
The course at Radyr is a 6,053 yards (5,535 m), par 70 (SSS 70) course for men and 5,485 yards (5,015 m), par 72 (SSS 72) for women, and operates all year round. Laid out by the course designer Harry Colt, the Chairman of the 2010 Ryder Cup described it as "One of Colt's Little Jewels".

Trudy Carradice, in the book Golf in Wales: A Pictorial History described the course as follows:

Radyr is a parkland course, albeit one with a few steep climbs and drops. The finishing hole is a classic example of this, a straight drive being needed to take you to the top of the hill before dropping sharply down to a sunken green close to the front of the clubhouse. The course winds its way across and around hillsides, through banks of tall, mature trees. Ditches, hedges and the occasional stretch of water provide other hazards that golfers might find better to avoid.

Carradice further notes that the course offers fine views of Cardiff and the Seven Estuary.
