= Lindrick Golf Club =

Golf course in South Yorkshire, England

Coordinates: 53.336791°N 1.183686°W

- Site of Special Scientific Interest
- Location of Lindrick Golf Club.
- Area of search: South Yorkshire
- Grid reference: SK543825, SK545828 and SK553827
- Interest: Biological
- Area: 22.0 ha (54 acres)
- Notification date: 1987
- Location map: Nature on the map

Lindrick Golf Club is a golf club in South Yorkshire, England; it is near Worksop. The club has an 18-hole championship golf course that has hosted many professional and elite amateur tournaments, including the 1957 Ryder Cup, the British Masters in 1966 and 1977, the Women's British Open in 1977 and 1988, and the 1960 Curtis Cup.

The course is a site of special scientific interest (SSSI). The SSSI covers 22 hectares (54 acres) and was designated for its biological interest. The site was notified in 1987.

== History ==
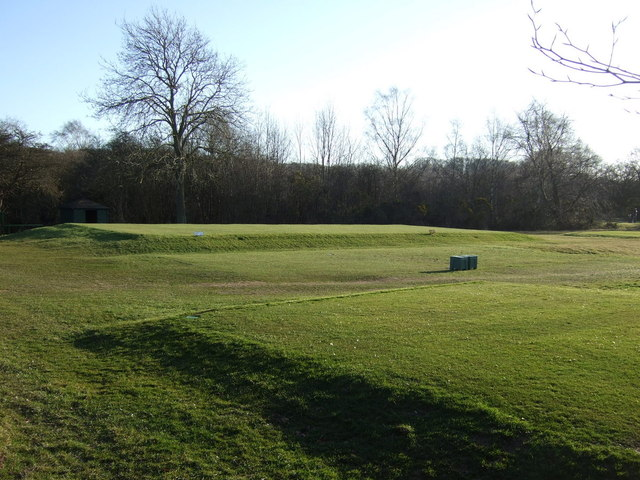
Lindrick Golf Club

Sheffield and District Golf Club was founded in 1891. The club was always known as Lindrick Golf Club, but did not officially acknowledge this name until 1934. The course on Lindrick Common was originally nine holes, designed by Buff Wilson and Old Tom Morris, and was extended to 18 holes in 1894. Major changes to the course layout were made in 1932, to avoid two holes being played over the A57. Tom Dunn, William Herbert Fowler, Harry Colt, Willie Park Jr., Alister MacKenzie, Fred Hawtree, Donald Steel, Cameron Sinclair and Ken Moodie are among the architects to have been consulted and worked on the course through the years.

Holes 1–11 and Hole 18 are situated on the south side of the A57, with Holes 12–17 being on the north side. The course has two tunnels providing safe crossing of the highway. The closing 18th hole features in The 500 World's Greatest Golf Holes and is also listed as one of Peter Alliss' favourite 18 holes of all time, and the course itself has regularly featured in the various top 100 course ratings.

== Tournaments hosted ==
The 1957 Ryder Cup was played at Lindrick, resulting in the only post-war victory for Great Britain & Ireland, captained by Dai Rees. The Curtis Cup was played on the course in 1960, and the Women's British Open has been held at the course on two occasions – in 1977 and 1988. Other championships to be held at Lindrick include the English Women's Amateur Championship in 2017, the English Amateur in 2022 and the Girls and Boys Home Internationals in 2023.

Lindrick also hosted the British Masters in 1966 and 1977, and is a Regional Qualifying venue for The Open Championship.

== See also ==
- List of Sites of Special Scientific Interest in South Yorkshire
