= Eric Brown (golfer) =

Scottish golfer

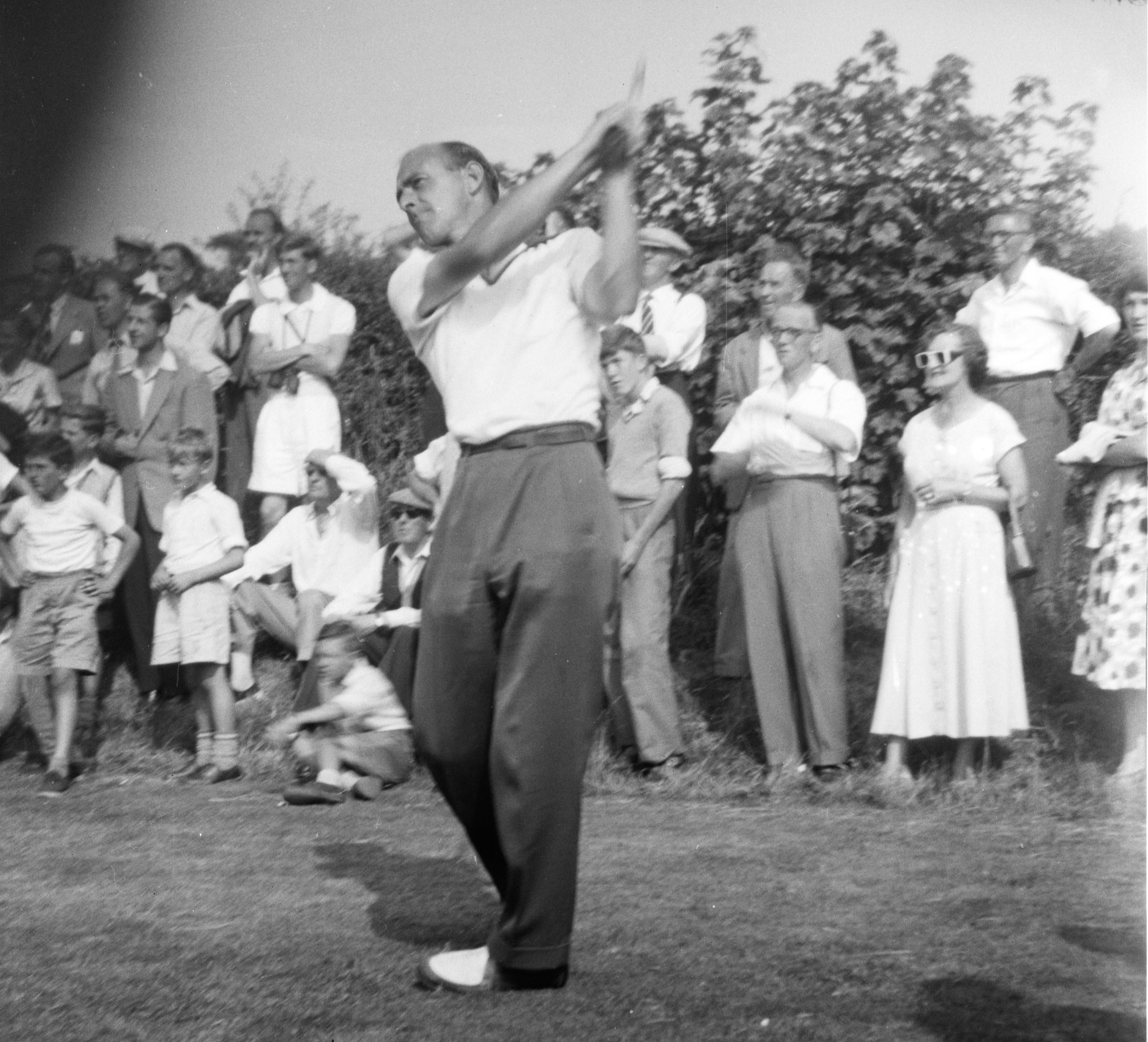

Personal information
- Full name: Eric Chalmers Brown
- Nationality: Scotland
- Born: 15 February 1925 Edinburgh, Scotland
- Died: 6 March 1986 (aged 61) Edinburgh, Scotland

Career
- Sport: Golf
- Turned professional: 1946
- Professional wins: 27

Best results in major championships
- Masters Tournament: DNP
- PGA Championship: DNP
- U.S. Open: DNP
- The Open Championship: 3rd/T3: 1957, 1958

Achievements and awards
- Harry Vardon Trophy: 1957

Eric Chalmers Brown (15 February 1925 – 6 March 1986) was a Scottish professional golfer and bar owner.

== Early life ==
Brown was born in Edinburgh, Scotland. Aged fifteen months he moved to Bathgate, when his father George got a job as a technical-subjects teacher. Eric stayed in Stuart Terrace and played at the golf course across the road.

== Professional career ==
Brown represented Great Britain in the Ryder Cup in 1953, 1955, 1957 and 1959 and had a 4–4–0 win–loss–half record. He won all of his four singles matches but lost his four foursomes matches. He topped the European Order of Merit in 1957. He was the non-playing captain of the British Ryder Cup teams in 1969 and 1971. He won the Scottish PGA Championship eight times between 1956 and 1968.

In 1974, he opened his own pub called Eric Brown's on Dalry Road in Edinburgh. The pub would become a fixture on the city's music scene and would host early performances from future top ten hitmakers like The Associates and The Thompson Twins on its small stage.

== Personal life ==
In March 1986, Brown died of a stroke at his home in Edinburgh.

== Amateur wins ==
This list may be incomplete.

- 1946 Scottish Amateur

== Professional wins (27) ==
These lists may be incomplete.

=== Great Britain and Ireland wins (24) ===
- 1950 Northern Open
- 1952 Penfold Tournament
- 1953 Irish Open, Northern Open
- 1954 Northern Open
- 1955 Northern Open
- 1956 Stuart C. Goodwin Tournament (tie with John Fallon), Scottish Professional Championship
- 1957 Dunlop Masters, Gleneagles-Saxone Foursomes Tournament (with George Will), Northern Open, Scottish Professional Championship
- 1958 Yorkshire Evening News Tournament (tie with Harold Henning), Hennessy Tournament, Scottish Professional Championship
- 1960 News of the World Match Play, Dunlop Tournament (tie with Ralph Moffitt), Scottish Professional Championship
- 1962 News of the World Match Play, Scottish Professional Championship
- 1965 Scottish Professional Championship
- 1966 Scottish Professional Championship (tie with John Panton), Cutty Sark Tournament
- 1968 Scottish Professional Championship

=== European wins (3) ===
- 1951 Swiss Open
- 1952 Italian Open
- 1953 Portuguese Open

== Results in major championships ==
Tournament	1948	1949	1950	1951	1952	1953	1954	1955	1956	1957	1958	1959
The Open Championship	CUT		23	T40	T9	T9		T12		3	T3	WD

Tournament	1960	1961	1962	1963	1964	1965	1966	1967	1968	1969	1970	1971
The Open Championship	T9	T5	T34	CUT	CUT	T17	T23	T43	T18	T16	T32	T40

Note: Brown only played in The Open Championship.

Top 10
Did not play

CUT = missed the half-way cut
WD = Withdrew
"T" indicates a tie for a place

== Team appearances ==
- Ryder Cup (representing Great Britain): 1953, 1955, 1957 (winners), 1959, 1969 (tie, non-playing captain)
- World Cup (representing Scotland): 1954, 1955, 1956, 1957, 1958, 1959, 1960, 1961, 1962, 1965, 1966, 1967, 1968
- Joy Cup (representing the British Isles): 1954 (winners), 1955 (winners), 1956 (winners), 1958 (winners)
- Amateurs–Professionals Match (representing the Professionals): 1957 (winners), 1958
- R.T.V. International Trophy (representing Scotland): 1967
- Double Diamond International (representing Scotland): 1971 (captain), 1972 (captain), 1973 (winners, captain)
