= John Fallon (golfer) =

Scottish golfer (1913–1985)

Personal information
- Nickname: Johnny
- Nationality: Scotland
- Born: 29 April 1913 Lanark, Scotland
- Died: 7 December 1985 (aged 72) Brighouse, West Yorkshire

Career
- Sport: Golf
- Status: Professional
- Professional wins: 4

Best results in major championships
- Masters Tournament: DNP
- PGA Championship: DNP
- U.S. Open: DNP
- The Open Championship: 2nd: 1955

John Fallon (29 April 1913 – 7 December 1985) was a Scottish professional golfer whose career spanned the years either side of World War II.

== Career ==
He was born in Lanark, Scotland. Although never a winner of a major tournament of note, Fallon often contended with high finishes – he lost the final of the 1954 British PGA Matchplay Championship, and was perhaps most unlucky that he missed out on a potential Open Championship that might have been played at St Andrews during the war years. He had placed third there in 1939, and then second in 1955, each time by just a handful of strokes.

Fallon played on the 1955 Ryder Cup team and in 1963 he was non-playing captain of the Great Britain Ryder Cup team.

== Professional wins ==
- 1937 Leeds Cup
- 1949 Leeds Cup
- 1950 Northern Professional Championship
- 1956 Stuart C. Goodwin Tournament (tie with Eric Brown)

== Results in major championships ==
Tournament	1931	1932	1933	1934	1935	1936	1937	1938	1939
The Open Championship	CUT			CUT		T23	T32	T26	T3

Tournament	1940	1941	1942	1943	1944	1945	1946	1947	1948	1949
The Open Championship	NT	NT	NT	NT	NT	NT	CUT		T21	T8

Tournament	1950	1951	1952	1953	1954	1955	1956	1957	1958	1959	1960	1961
The Open Championship	CUT	T37		CUT		2		T19	CUT			CUT

Note: Fallon only played in The Open Championship.

Top 10
Did not play

NT = No tournament
CUT = missed the half-way cut
"T" indicates a tie for a place

== Team appearances ==
- Ryder Cup (representing Great Britain): 1955, 1963 (non-playing captain)
- England–Scotland Professional Match (representing Scotland): 1936, 1937, 1938
- Triangular Professional Tournament (representing Scotland): 1937
- Llandudno International Golf Trophy (representing Scotland): 1938
