= Hennessy Tournament =

Former Irish golf tournament

Tournament information
- Location: Ireland
- Established: 1957
- Format: 72-hole stroke play
- Final year: 1965

Tournament record score
- Aggregate: 268 Christy O'Connor Snr (1962)

Final champion
- Christy Greene

The Hennessy Tournament was an Irish golf tournament played from 1957 to 1965. Christy O'Connor Snr won the event 5 times between 1957 and 1963. The event was sponsored by Hennessy, a cognac distiller.

== History ==
Total prize money was £500 in 1957, 500 guineas in 1958, 1960 and 1961, 750 guineas in 1962 and 1963 and £1,500 in 1965. In 1964 Hennessy sponsored a round-robin event, the Hennessy Round-robin Tournament which had prize money of £1,500.

== Winners ==
Year	Venue	Winner	Score	Margin of victory	Runner(s)-up	Ref
1957	Woodbrook	(Republic of Ireland) Christy O'Connor Snr	279	3 strokes	(Republic of Ireland) Jimmy Martin	
1958	Clandeboye	(Scotland) Eric Brown	279	1 stroke	(Republic of Ireland) Harry Bradshaw	
1959	Cork	(Republic of Ireland) Ernie Jones	278	1 stroke	(Northern Ireland) Norman Drew	
1960	Royal Dublin	(Republic of Ireland) Christy O'Connor Snr	270	12 strokes	(Republic of Ireland) Christy Greene	
1961	Balmoral	(Republic of Ireland) Christy O'Connor Snr	276	7 strokes	(Republic of Ireland) Christy Greene (Northern Ireland) Jimmy Henderson	
1962	Clandeboye	(Republic of Ireland) Christy O'Connor Snr	268	17 strokes	(Northern Ireland) Billy Kerr (Republic of Ireland) Jimmy Kinsella	
1963	Clandeboye	(Republic of Ireland) Christy O'Connor Snr	277	3 strokes	(England) Peter Alliss	
1964	Replaced by the Hennessy Round-robin Tournament					
1965	Clandeboye	(Republic of Ireland) Christy Greene	275	3 strokes	(Republic of Ireland) Christy O'Connor Snr	
