= Carroll's Irish Match Play Championship =

Golf tournament in Ireland

Tournament information
- Location: Ireland
- Established: 1969
- Format: Match play
- Final year: 1982

Final champion
- Paddy McGuirk

The Carroll's Irish Match Play Championship was a professional match play golf tournament played in Ireland from 1969 to 1982. It was inaugurated by sponsors Carroll's in 1969, replacing the Carroll's Number 1 Tournament.

== Finals results ==
Year	Venue	Winner	Final score	Runner-up	Ref
1982 (Note: Semi finals and final delayed by a week due to bad weather.)	Rosslare	(Republic of Ireland) Paddy McGuirk	3 and 2	(England) Peter Townsend	
1981	Cork	(Republic of Ireland) Eamonn Darcy	1 hole	(Republic of Ireland) Christy O'Connor Jnr	
1980	Connemara	(Republic of Ireland) Des Smyth	7 and 5	(Northern Ireland) David Jones	
1979	Killarney	(Northern Ireland) David Jones	2 and 1	(Republic of Ireland) Eamonn Darcy	
1978	Ballybunion	(Republic of Ireland) Arnold O'Connor	2 and 1	(Republic of Ireland) Ernie Jones	
1977	Galway	(Republic of Ireland) Christy O'Connor Jnr	3 and 2	(Republic of Ireland) John McGuirk	
1976	Tramore	(England) Peter Townsend	3 and 2	(Republic of Ireland) Jimmy Kinsella	
1975	Lahinch	(Republic of Ireland) Christy O'Connor Jnr	2 and 1	(England) Peter Townsend	
1974	County Sligo	(Republic of Ireland) Eddie Polland	3 and 2	(Republic of Ireland) Ernie Jones	
1973	Kilkenny	(Republic of Ireland) Christy O'Connor Jnr	2 and 1	(Republic of Ireland) Jimmy Kinsella	
1972	Douglas	(Republic of Ireland) Leonard Owens	4 and 2	(Republic of Ireland) Roddy Carr	
1971	Tramore	(England) Peter Townsend	1 hole	(Scotland) Iain Clark	
1970	Mullingar	(Republic of Ireland) Paddy Skerritt	1 hole	(Northern Ireland) Hugh Jackson	
1969	Galway	(Republic of Ireland) Paddy McGuirk	2 and 1	(Republic of Ireland) Michael Murphy	
