= Hennessy Round-robin Tournament =

Tournament information
- Location: Bangor, County Down, Northern Ireland
- Established: 1964
- Course: Clandeboye Golf Club
- Month played: May
- Final year: 1964

Final champion
- Harry Weetman

The Hennessy Round-robin Tournament was a 12-man round-robin golf tournament on the British PGA circuit contested in 1964. It was one of two round-robin events during the season, the Esso Golden Tournament being the other.

In essence, the Hennessy Round-robin was merely a change in format for the Hennessy Tournament, a 72-hole stroke play tournament which ran from 1957 to 1965. It was played at the Clandeboye Golf Club near Bangor, County Down, Northern Ireland, which had been the venue for the Hennessy Tournament since 1962. Total prize money was £1,500.

The tournament involved teams of three from each of the home nations, with every player completing eleven 18-hole matches with points awarded for matches won or halved. Harry Weetman won the individual event and alongside Peter Alliss and Bernard Hunt, his England team won the team prize.

== Tournament summary ==
There were 12 competitors in 4 teams. The Republic of Ireland team was Christy Greene, Nicky Lynch and Christy O'Connor Snr. The Northern Ireland team was Jimmy Henderson, Hugh Jackson and Ernie Jones. The England team was Peter Alliss, Bernard Hunt and Harry Weetman. The Scottish team was Eric Brown, John Panton and George Will.

The competitors played each of the other 11 in an 18-hole match play contest. There were two points for a win and one for a halved match. Most matches were played as three-balls with each playing the other two simultaneously. The tournament was played over four days, from 26 to 29 May. Only the six Irish players competed on the first day, playing a singles match. They then played 5 rounds over the next three days. The English and Scottish competitors played 6 rounds on the remaining three days but in one of those matches they only played a single opponent.

Harry Weetman won 9 of his 11 matches and halved another, giving him 19 points, 4 ahead of the rest. He had scored 17 points before the final afternoon round, 6 ahead of anyone else, giving him a guaranteed victory at that point since only 4 points were available in the final round. England won the team event with 44 points, ahead of Scotland with 37. Weetman won just over £400 for his individual and team successes.

== Final tables ==
=== Individual ===
Position	Player	Country	Points
1	Harry Weetman	England	19
2	Peter Alliss	England	15
3	John Panton	Scotland	14
4	Christy O'Connor Snr	Ireland	13
5=	George Will	Scotland	12
5=	Christy Greene	Ireland	12
7=	Jimmy Henderson	Northern Ireland	11
7=	Eric Brown	Scotland	11
9	Bernard Hunt	England	10
10	Nicky Lynch	Ireland	8
11	Ernie Jones	Northern Ireland	4
12	Hugh Jackson	Northern Ireland	3

=== Team ===
Position	Country	Points
1	England	44
2	Scotland	37
3	Ireland	33
4	Northern Ireland	18
