= Elm Park (disambiguation) =

Elm Park may refer to:

== Europe ==
- Elm Park in the London Borough of Havering
  - Elm Park tube station, on the District Line
- Elm Park (stadium), the former home of Reading Football Club
- Elm Park, a district of Dublin, Ireland
- Elm Park Golf Club, a golf and tennis club at Nutley Lane, Dublin, Ireland
- Elm Park, a notorious housing estate located close to the University of Limerick in Castletroy, County Limerick, Ireland
- Elm Park School in Winterbourne, Gloucestershire

== North America ==
- Elm Park, Arkansas, a community in Scott County, Arkansas
- Elm Park (Worcester, Massachusetts), a historic park
- Elm Park and Isaac Sprague Memorial Tower in Wellesley, Massachusetts
- Elm Park, Manhattan, New York, the grounds of the Apthorpe Mansion in Upper Manhattan
- Elm Park, Staten Island, New York
  - Elm Park (Staten Island Railway station), a former railway station
- Elm Park, Winnipeg, Canada

== Other ==
- Elm Park (horse) a Thoroughbred racehorse
