= Esso Golden Tournament =

Tournament information
- Location: Rickmansworth, Hertfordshire, England
- Established: 1961
- Course(s): Moor Park Golf Club
- Month played: July/August
- Final year: 1967

Final champion
- Kel Nagle and Peter Thomson (tie)

Location in England

The Esso Golden Tournament was a golf tournament on the British PGA circuit from 1961 to 1967. It was played in a round-robin format at the Moor Park Golf Club in Rickmansworth, Hertfordshire, England. The event was sponsored by Esso, and was cancelled in 1968 when they terminated their sponsorship following disagreements with the PGA.

There were 15 competitors in each tournament who played each of the other 14 in an 18-hole match play contest. Most matches were played as a three-ball with three players playing a match against one another, each player playing two distinct matches. Some matches were played as ordinary singles match play. Two points were awarded for each match won while halved matches earned one point.

Prize money for each tournament was £5,700. Players received £20 for each point won, a total of £4,200 for the 210 matches. In addition, the first four in the final table received prize money of £750, £400, £250 and £100.

A similar round-robin tournament, the Penfold Professional Golf League, was played in 1938 and 1939, while the Goodall Palm Beach Round Robin, was played on the PGA Tour from 1938 to 1957. Round-robin tournaments became popular at this time with the Royal Gold Tournament contested in 1962 and Hennessy Round-robin Tournament being played in 1964.

== Winners ==
Year	Winner	Country	Score	Margin of victory	Runner(s)-up	Winner's share (£)	Ref
1961	Dave Thomas; Peter Thomson	Wales; Australia	21	Tie		995 (each)	
1962	Dave Thomas	Wales	19	1 point	(England) Jimmy Hitchcock (Australia) Kel Nagle (Australia) Peter Thomson	1,130	
1963	Kel Nagle	Australia	23	2 points	(England) Bernard Hunt (Australia) Peter Thomson (England) Harry Weetman	1,210	
1964	Peter Alliss	England	25	7 points	(Republic of Ireland) Christy O'Connor Snr (Wales) Dave Thomas	1,250	
1965	George Will	Scotland	24	4 points	(Wales) Dave Thomas	1,230	
1966	Dave Thomas	Wales	23	2 points	(England) Neil Coles	1,210	
1967	Kel Nagle; Peter Thomson	Australia; Australia	20	Tie		975 (each)	
1968	Tournament cancelled						

The winner's share includes £20 won for each point.
