= Irish Dunlop Tournament =

Tournament information
- Location: Ireland
- Established: 1933
- Format: Stroke play (Match play in 1947)
- Final year: 1980

Final champion
- Des Smyth

The Irish Dunlop Tournament was a professional golf tournament played in Ireland until 1980. It was one of the top events on the professional circuit in Ireland.

Prior to World War II, it was a 72-hole stroke play event known as the Dunlop-Irish Tournament and was one of several regional tournaments sponsored by Dunlop in which the winners were sometimes invited to play in the Dunlop-Metropolitan Tournament. After the war Dunlop revived the tournament in 1946, switching to match play in 1947. After a break of two years, the Irish Dunlop returned as a 72-hole stroke play event in 1950, after which it was staged annually until its cancellation in 1981. It also provided a qualification route for the prestigious Dunlop Masters on the British PGA circuit.

In its final year, Des Smyth broke all records for the tournament as he finished 16 strokes ahead of the field with a 261 (27 under par) aggregate. He also set a new course record for Headfort Golf Club with a 64 in the final round, having already recorded 65 in both the first and third rounds.

== Winners ==
Year	Venue	Winner	Score	Ref
1980	Headfort	(Republic of Ireland) Des Smyth	261	
1979	Tramore	(Northern Ireland) David Jones	284	
1978	Hermitage	(Northern Ireland) David Jones	279	
1977	Douglas	(England) Peter Townsend	276	
1976	Hermitage	(Republic of Ireland) Eamonn Darcy	275	
1975	Bundoran	(Northern Ireland) Eddie Polland	277	
1974	Hermitage	(Republic of Ireland) Christy O'Connor Jnr	284	
1973	Headfort	(Northern Ireland) Eddie Polland	283	
1972	Kilkenny	(Republic of Ireland) John O'Leary	280	
1971	Douglas	(Republic of Ireland) Jimmy Kinsella	279	
1970	Tullamore	(Republic of Ireland) Hugh Boyle	277	
1969	Bundorran	(Republic of Ireland) Michael Murphy	284	
1968	Limerick	(Northern Ireland) Hugh Jackson	279	
1967	Tramore	(Republic of Ireland) Christy O'Connor Snr	275	
1966	Bettystown	(Republic of Ireland) Christy O'Connor Snr	265	
1965	Carlow	(Republic of Ireland) Christy O'Connor Snr	288	
1964	Galway	(Republic of Ireland) Christy Greene	276	
1963	Douglas	(Republic of Ireland) Nicky Lynch	279	
1962 (Note: Incorporating the Willie Nolan Cup.)	Elm Park	(Republic of Ireland) Christy O'Connor Snr	276	
1961	Clontarf (Note: Originally scheduled at Elm Park.)	(Republic of Ireland) Nicky Lynch	278	
1960	Dun Laoghaire	(Republic of Ireland) Christy O'Connor Snr (Republic of Ireland) Jimmy Kinsella	271	
1959	Hermitage	(Northern Ireland) Norman Drew	284	
1958	Elm Park	(Republic of Ireland) Harry Bradshaw (Note: The Willie Nolan Cup was won by Bradshaw after a playoff.) (Northern Ireland) Norman Drew	288	
1957	Dun Laoghaire	(Northern Ireland) Jimmy Henderson (Republic of Ireland) Willie Gaffney	283	
1956	Dun Laoghaire	(Northern Ireland) Fred Daly	276	
1955	Dun Laoghaire	(Republic of Ireland) Christy O'Connor Snr	268	
1954	Woodbrook	(Northern Ireland) Fred Daly	270	
1953	Newlands	(Republic of Ireland) Christy O'Connor Snr	278	
1952	Castle	(Northern Ireland) Fred Daly	273	
1951	Milltown	(Republic of Ireland) Harry Bradshaw	274	
1950	Castle	(Republic of Ireland) Harry Bradshaw	282	
1949				
1948				
1947	Portmarnock	(Republic of Ireland) John McKenna	6 and 5	
1946	Castle	(Northern Ireland) Fred Daly	288	
Dunlop-Irish Tournament
1937	Newlands	(Republic of Ireland) John McKenna	288	
1936	Royal Belfast	(Republic of Ireland) Paddy Mahon	298	
1935	Royal Dublin	(Republic of Ireland) Pat O'Connor	290	
1934	Knock	(Republic of Ireland) Willie Nolan	283	
1933	Milltown	(Republic of Ireland) Willie Nolan (Republic of Ireland) Pat O'Connor	291	

== See also ==
- Dunlop-Metropolitan Tournament
