= Gallaher Ulster Open =

Golf tournament

Tournament information
- Location: Northern Ireland
- Established: 1965
- Tour(s): British PGA Circuit
- Format: Stroke play
- Final year: 1971

Tournament record score
- Aggregate: 264 John Lister (1970)

Final champion
- Tommy Horton

The Gallaher Ulster Open was a professional golf tournament that was played in Northern Ireland between 1965 and 1971. It was last played the year prior to the formation of the formally organised professional tour which evolved into the European Tour, and was a British PGA Order of Merit counting event.

== Winners ==
Year	Winner	Venue	Score	Margin of victory	Runner(s)-up	Winner's share (£)	Ref
1965	(England) Bernard Hunt	Shandon Park	273	Playoff (6th hole)	(Wales) Brian Huggett (England) Lionel Platts	1,000	
1966	(Republic of Ireland) Christy O'Connor Snr	Shandon Park	268	Playoff (1st hole)	(South Africa) Cobie Legrange (Scotland) George Will	700	
1967	(England) Bernard Hunt	Shandon Park	267	1 stroke	(Republic of Ireland) Christy O'Connor Snr	700	
1968	(Republic of Ireland) Christy O'Connor Snr	Shandon Park	267	2 strokes	(England) Peter Butler	700	
1969	(Republic of Ireland) Christy O'Connor Snr	Shandon Park	271	3 strokes	(Northern Ireland) Norman Drew (England) Malcolm Gregson (England) Bernard Hunt (Republic of Ireland) Jimmy Martin	700	
1970	(New Zealand) John Lister	Shandon Park	264	3 strokes	(England) Tommy Horton	1,000	
1971	(England) Tommy Horton	Malone	274	1 stroke	(England) Neil Coles	1,350	
