= Irish PGA Championship =

Irish professional golf tournament

Tournament information
- Location: Ireland
- Established: 1907
- Course: Limerick Golf Club (2026)
- Par: 72
- Tour: PGA of Ireland
- Format: Stroke play (since 1910); Match play (1907–1909)
- Month played: August

Current champion
- Cormac Sharvin (2026)

The Irish PGA Championship, formerly the Irish Professional Championship and colloquially known as the Irish Professional Close or National Championship, is a golf tournament that is played annually in Ireland since 1907. It is one of the oldest golf tournaments in the world, the oldest in the country, and has been played at many different golf courses in Ireland.

It is the marquee event on the PGA Tour of Ireland's schedule, having many notable winners in the over 100 years of play. Christy O'Connor Snr and Harry Bradshaw have the most wins in the event with 10. The event was played in match-play format from its inauguration in 1907 until it became a stroke play event in 1910.

The 2026 event took place at Limerick Golf Club from August 3rd to August 5th. Cormac Sharvin from Killeen Castle took the crown, defeating The K Club's Conor O'Rourke in a sudden-death playoff.

== Winners ==
Year	Winner	Venue	Score	Margin of victory	Runner(s)-up	Ref
Irish PGA Championship
2026	Cormac Sharvin	Limerick	214	Playoff	Conor O'Rourke	
2025	Simon Thornton (4)	Monkstown	201	2 strokes	Seán O'Donoughue	
2024	Niall Kearney (3)	Palmerstown House	204	6 strokes	Michael McGeady	
2023	David Higgins (3)	Carne	216	1 stroke	Simon Thornton	
2022	Damien McGrane (3)	Carne	208	2 strokes	Brian McElhinney	
2021	David Higgins (2)	Carne	213	1 stroke	Mark Staunton	
2020	Simon Thornton (3)	Roganstown	140	Playoff (Note: Thornton won with a birdie on the first hole of a sudden-death playoff)	Colm Moriarty	
2019	Damien McGrane (2)	Bunclody	209	1 stroke	Michael McGeady	
2018	Simon Thornton (2)	Galway Bay	141	1 stroke	Richard Kilpatrick	
2017	Tim Rice	Moyvalley	271	3 strokes	Colm Moriarty	
2016	Damien McGrane	Moyvalley	278	1 stroke	Simon Thornton	
2015	Niall Kearney (2)	Dundalk	266	14 strokes	Eamonn Brady, Richard Kilpatrick, James Quinlivan	
2014	Niall Kearney	Adare Manor	268	1 stroke	Michael McGeady	
2013	Michael McGeady	Roganstown	275	1 stroke	Cian McNamara, Damian Mooney	
2012	David Higgins	Mount Juliet	209	Playoff (Note: Higgins won with birdie on the third hole of a sudden-death playoff; Murphy was eliminated at the first extra hole.)	Gary Murphy, Noel Murray	
2011	Simon Thornton	Seapoint	269	6 strokes	Gary Murphy	
Ladbrokes.com Irish PGA Championship
2010	David Mortimer (2)	Seapoint	277	1 stroke	Damien McGrane	
2009	Pádraig Harrington (6)	The European	283	7 strokes	Brian McElhinney	
2008	Pádraig Harrington (5)	The European	285	4 strokes	Philip Walton	
Irish PGA Championship
2007	Pádraig Harrington (4)	The European	279	Playoff (Note: Harrington won with par on the first hole of a sudden-death playoff.)	Brendan McGovern	
2006	David Mortimer	Druids Heath	286	1 stroke	John Dwyer, Robert Giles	
2005	Pádraig Harrington (3)	PGA National	285	Playoff (Note: Harrington won with par on the first hole of a sudden-death playoff.)	Stephen Hamill, Damien McGrane	
2004	Pádraig Harrington (2)	St. Margarets	287	1 stroke	Philip Walton	
Smurfit Irish PGA Championship
2003	Paul McGinley (4)	Adare Manor	280	5 strokes	Gary Murphy	
2002	Paul McGinley (3)	Westport	213	3 strokes	John Dwyer	
2001	Des Smyth (6)	Castlerock	273	3 strokes	Paul McGinley	
2000	Paul McGinley (2)	County Louth	270	4 strokes	Eamonn Darcy	
1999	Neil Manchip	Island	271	3 strokes	Darren Clarke	
1998	Pádraig Harrington	Powerscourt	216	Playoff (Note: Harrington won with a birdie on the first hole of a sudden-death playoff.)	Michael Bannon, Francis Howley, Des Smyth	
1997	Paul McGinley	Fota Island	285	3 strokes	Stephen Hamill, David Higgins, John McHenry	
1996	Des Smyth (5)	Slieve Russell	281	5 strokes	Eamonn Darcy, Philip Walton	
1995	Philip Walton (4)	Belvoir Park	273	1 stroke	Paul McGinley	
1994	Darren Clarke	Galway Bay	285	3 strokes	Raymond Burns	
1993	Martin Sludds (2)	The K Club	285	3 strokes	Eamonn Darcy	
1992	Eamonn Darcy (2)	The K Club	285	6 strokes	Philip Walton	
1991	Philip Walton (3)	Woodbrook	277	2 strokes	Eamonn Darcy	
1990	Des Smyth (4)	Woodbrook	271	8 strokes	Jimmy Heggarty	
Spawell Irish Professional Championship
1989	Philip Walton (2)	Castle	266	9 strokes	Des Smyth	
Irish Professional Championship
1988	Eamonn Darcy	Castle	269	3 strokes	Des Smyth	
1987	Philip Walton	County Louth	144	Playoff (Note: Walton won with an eagle on the second hole of a sudden-death playoff.)	Des Smyth	
Innovation Group Irish Professional Championship
1986	Des Smyth (3)	Waterville	282	7 stroke	Christy O'Connor Snr	
Tretorn–Spalding Irish Professional Championship
1985	Des Smyth (2)	County Louth	204	2 stroke	Eamonn Darcy	
1984	Martin Sludds	Skerries	277	1 stroke	Des Smyth	
Rank Xerox (Irish) Professional Championship
1983	Liam Higgins	Woodbrook	275	2 strokes	David Feherty	
1982	David Feherty (2)	Woodbrook	287	1 stroke	Christy O'Connor Jnr	
1981	David Jones	Woodbrook	283	4 strokes	Leonard Owens	
1980	David Feherty	Royal Dublin	283	3 strokes	Hugh Jackson	
1979	Des Smyth	Royal Dublin	215 (Note: Tournament contested over 54-holes.)	1 stroke	David Jones	
1978	Christy O'Connor Snr (10)	Royal Dublin	286	Playoff (Note: O'Connor won after a three-hole playoff.)	Michael Murphy	
1977	Paddy Skerritt	Woodbrook	281	1 stroke	Christy O'Connor Jnr	
Aer Lingus Irish Professional Championship
1976	Paddy McGuirk	Waterville	291	2 strokes	Liam Higgins	
Irish (Guinness) Professional Championship
1975	Christy O'Connor Snr (9)	Carlow	275	3 strokes	David Jones, Jimmy Kinsella	
1974	Eddie Polland	Portstewart	277	16 strokes	Ernie Jones, Jimmy Martin	
1973	Jimmy Kinsella (2)	Limerick	284	Playoff (Note: Kinsella won with a par on the first hole of a sudden-death playoff.)	Paul Leonard	
1972	Jimmy Kinsella	Bundoran	289	1 stroke	Hugh Boyle	
1971	Christy O'Connor Snr (8)	Galway	278	2 strokes	Hugh Jackson	
1970	Hugh Jackson	Massereene	283			
1969	Jimmy Martin	Dundalk	268	Playoff (Note: Martin won with a par on the second hole of a sudden-death playoff.)	Jimmy Kinsella	
1968	Christy Greene (2)	Knock	282	1 stroke	Jimmy Henderson, Jimmy Martin	
1967	Hugh Boyle	Tullamore	214 (Note: Final round cancelled because of rain.)	1 stroke	Ernie Jones	
1966	Christy O'Connor Snr (7)	Warrenpoint	269	6 strokes	Ernie Jones, Jimmy Martin	
1965	Christy O'Connor Snr (6)	Mullingar	283	Playoff (Note: O'Connor with a birdie on the fourth hole of a sudden-death playoff; Drew was eliminated at the first extra hole.)	Norman Drew, Nicky Lynch	
Irish Professional Championship
1964	Ernie Jones (2)	Knock	277	3 strokes	Nicky Lynch	
1963	Christy O'Connor Snr (5)	Cork	271	4 strokes	Nicky Lynch	
1962	Christy O'Connor Snr (4)	Bangor	264		Nicky Lynch	
1961	Christy O'Connor Snr (3)	Lahinch	280	5 strokes	Christy Greene	
1960	Christy O'Connor Snr (2)	Warrenpoint	271	2 strokes	Ernie Jones, Jimmy Kinsella, Jimmy Martin	
1959	Norman Drew	Mullingar	282	2 strokes	Christy O'Connor Snr	
1958	Christy O'Connor Snr	Royal Belfast	279	6 strokes	Christy Greene	
1957	Harry Bradshaw (10)	Ballybunion	286	4 strokes	Christy O'Connor Snr	
1956	Christy Greene	Clandeboye	281	2 strokes	Norman Drew	
1955	Ernie Jones	Castletroy	276	5 strokes	Harry Bradshaw	
1954	Harry Bradshaw (9)	Royal Co Down	300	Playoff (Note: Bradshaw won following a 36-hole playoff; Bradshaw 148, O'Connor 150.)	Christy O'Connor Snr	
1953	Harry Bradshaw (8)	Dundalk	272	9 strokes	Jimmy Martin	
1952	Fred Daly (3)	Mullingar	284	2 strokes	Harry Bradshaw	
1951	Harry Bradshaw (7)	Balmoral	280	1 stroke	Fred Daly	
1950	Harry Bradshaw (6)	Grange	277	6 strokes	Joe Carroll, Fred Daly	
1949	Christy Kane	Royal Portrush	301	4 strokes	Philip Stevenson	
1948	John McKenna (2)	Galway	285	4 strokes	Christy Kane	
1947	Harry Bradshaw (5)	County Louth	291	9 strokes	WJ Clarke, John McKenna	
1946	Fred Daly (2)	Clandeboye	285	1 stroke	Jack McLachlan	
1945	John McKenna	Newlands	283	5 strokes	Fred Daly	
1944	Harry Bradshaw (4)	Hermitage	291	2 strokes	John McKenna	
1943	Harry Bradshaw (3)	Dún Laoghaire	277	1 stroke	Fred Daly, Joe McCartney	
1942	Harry Bradshaw (2)	Hermitage	285	10 strokes	Eddie Hackett	
1941	Harry Bradshaw	County Sligo	293	3 strokes	Jack McLachlan	
1940	Fred Daly	Cork	305	1 stroke	Harry Bradshaw	
1939	Paddy Mahon (3)	Bundoran	290	5 strokes	Fred Daly	
1938	Paddy Mahon (2)	Royal Portrush	291	6 strokes	Willie Nolan	
1937	Paddy Mahon	Portmarnock	298	10 strokes	Joe McCartney	
1936	Joe McCartney (3)	Galway	281	4 strokes	Paddy Mahon	
1935	Sydney Fairweather (2)	Belvoir Park	293	1 stroke	Paddy Mahon	
1934	Willie Nolan	Dún Laoghaire	282	1 stroke	AJ Ward	
1933	Jimmy Adams	Castlerock	291	1 stroke	Paddy Mahon	
1932	Hugh McNeill (2)	Royal Dublin	304	2 strokes	Paddy Mahon	
1931	Joe McCartney (2)	Portstewart	283	Playoff (Note: McCartney won following a 36-hole playoff; McCartney 143, McNeill 146.)	Hugh McNeill	
1930	Joe McCartney	Castle	291	6 strokes	Pat O'Connor	
1929	Hugh McNeill	Royal Co Down	317	2 strokes	Charlie Pope	
1928	Leo Wallace	County Sligo	315	3 strokes	Willie Nolan	
1927	Pat O'Hare (2)	Royal Dublin	301	9 strokes	Dan Murray	
1926	Sydney Fairweather	Malone	299	3 strokes	Pat O'Hare	
1925	Moses O'Neill (3)	Portmarnock	315	5 strokes	Willie Nolan	
1924	Moses O'Neill (2)	Malone	305	2 strokes	Sydney Fairweather, Hugh McNeill	
1923	Moses O'Neill	Milltown	309	1 stroke	William Holley	
1922	James Martin	Royal Portrush	328	5 strokes	Charlie Pope	
1921	James Cromwell	Portmarnock	313	5 strokes	Hugh McNeill	
1920	Jimmy O'Hare	Castlerock	315	Playoff (Note: O'Hare won following an 18-hole playoff; O'Hare 75, Hamill 78.)	Harry Hamill	
1919	Pat O'Hare	Portmarnock	326	2 strokes	William Holley	
1915–1918: Cancelled due to World War I
1914	Charlie Pope	Royal Co Down	305	8 strokes	Jimmy O'Hare, Pat O'Hare	
1913	Michael Moran (5)	Portmarnock	324	2 strokes	Pat O'Hare	
1912	Michael Moran (4)	Castlerock	305	6 strokes	Pat Doyle	
1911	Michael Moran (3)	Royal Portrush	310	6 strokes	James Edmundson	
1910	Michael Moran (2)	Royal Dublin	296	10 strokes	Michael Cahill	
1909	Michael Moran	Royal Co Down	9 & 7		Harry Kidd	
1908	James Edmundson (2)	Portmarnock	5 & 3		Bertie Snowball	
1907	James Edmundson	Royal Portrush	2 & 1		Bertie Snowball	

From 1907 to 1909 the championship was a match-play event. The final was over 18 holes in 1907 and 36 holes in 1908 and 1909. The format changed to stroke play from 1910. The tournament was reduced to 54 holes in 1967, 1979, 1985, 1998, 2002 and 2012 and to 36 holes in 1987.

== Most wins ==
Rank	Player	# Wins	Last win
T1	Harry Bradshaw	10	1957
	Christy O'Connor Snr	10	1978
T3	Pádraig Harrington	6	2009
	Des Smyth	6	2001
5	Michael Moran	5	1913
T6	Paul McGinley	4	2003
	Philip Walton	4	1995

== Tournament summaries ==
=== 1907 Irish Professional Championship ===
The first Irish Professional Championship was played on 20 and 21 May 1907 at Royal Portrush Golf Club. There was an 18-hole stroke play contest on the first morning with the leading 8 qualifying for the knockout matchplay stage. James Edmundson and Harry Hamill led with scores of 76. Three players were tied for the final place and played a 9-hole playoff to decide the last place, won by Hugh McNeill. In the first round of the matchplay Edmundson and Hamill were drawn to play each other, Edmundson being the surprise winner by 5&4. The semi-finals and final were played on the second day. Local professional Edmundson and Yorkshireman Bertie Snowball won their semi-finals and met in the final. The match was all square after 9 holes but Edmundson won the next three and eventually won 2&1.

The Championship was preceded by the first professional match between Ireland and Scotland on 18 May. Teams of 12 played singles and foursomes. Ireland beat a weak Scotland team by 14 matches to 3 with 1 match halved. The players had played a 36-hole stroke-play event the previous day, won by Michael Moran with a score of 154, 4 ahead of Bertie Snowball.

=== 1908 Irish Professional Championship ===
The 1908 Championship was extended to a third day, being played from 13–15 May at Portmarnock Golf Club. The first day was a 36-hole event with 8 qualifying for the matchplay stage. As in 1907 James Edmundson and Harry Hamill led, with scores of 160. Edmundson and Bertie Snowball again met in the final. In the 36-hole final Edmundson won comfortably 5&3 after being 4 up after 18 holes. Edmundson won a gold medal and the £10 first prize.

=== 1909 Irish Professional Championship ===
The 1909 Championship retained the same format and was played from 12–14 May at Royal County Down Golf Club. James Edmundson was again joint leader, this time with Michael Moran, with scores of 167. In the first round Edmundson was finally defeated. Moran and Harry Kidd won their two matches and met in the final. Moran started badly and was 3 down after 6 holes. However, he then won the next 6 holes and was 2 up after the first round. Moran won the first hole in the afternoon and from the 5th to the 11th holes won 6 more to win easily 9&7, the first of five successive victories in the championship.

=== 1910 Irish Professional Championship ===
From 1910 the Championship became a 72-hole strokeplay event. It was played on 9 and 10 June at Royal Dublin Golf Club. Defending champion Michael Moran, pulled 7 ahead at the end of the first day after a second round 72, a course record. On the second day Moran set another course record of 70, extending his lead to 13. A final round of 76 gave him a 10 stroke win over Michael Cahill and 23 ahead of the rest of the field.

=== 1911 Irish Professional Championship ===
The 1911 Championship was played on 8 and 9 June at Royal Portrush Golf Club. Michael Moran led after the first day on 159, three ahead of James Edmundson. In the third round Edmundson scored 75 to Moran's 78 to be on level terms. Moran then scored a final round 72 to Edmundson's 78 to win by six strokes. Hugh McNeill finished third a further three shots behind.

=== 1912 Irish Professional Championship ===
The 1912 Championship was played on 9 and 10 May at Castlerock Golf Club. Pat Doyle led after the first day on 152, having set a course record of 72 in his afternoon round. Michael Moran was three behind on 155. Moran scored 75 in the third round to Doyle's 82 to take a 4 stroke lead. Another 75 from Moran gave him a 6 shot win over Doyle who finished with a 77. Harry Hamill was third, a further shot behind.

=== 1913 Irish Professional Championship ===
The 1913 Championship was played on 31 July and 1 August at Portmarnock Golf Club. After two rounds Hugh McNeill led on 163, ahead of Pat O'Hare on 164. Defending champion Michael Moran was tied for fifth after a second round 88. After a third round 79 O'Hare had a lead of 5 strokes from McNeill and Charlie Pope, with Moran a further shot back. McNeill and Pope faded in the final round, while O'Hare and Moran both took 39 for the front nine. O'Hare then took 7 at the 10th and 11th and came home in 44 to Moran's 36 to give Moran a two stroke victory and his fifth successive title. Pope had a final round 82 to finish third.

=== 1914 Irish Professional Championship ===
In early 1914 Michael Moran left Royal Dublin Golf Club to be professional at Seaham Harbour, County Durham and so he was not eligible to defend his title in 1914. The 1914 Championship was played on 28 and 29 May at Royal County Down Golf Club. Local professional Alex Robertson led after the first day on 151 with Jimmy O'Hare a shot behind. After the third round Hugh McNeill and Charlie Pope were tied for the lead with Robertson a shot behind. In the final round Pope took 75 to McNeill's 89 to take the championship by 8 strokes from brothers Jimmy and Pat O'Hare with Robertson a further shot behind.
