= 1965 Canada Cup =

Coordinates: 40.452°N 3.753°W

Tournament information
- Dates: 30 September – 3 October
- Location: Madrid, Spain
- Courses: Real Sociedad Hípica Española Club de Campo; Black course
- Format: 72 holes stroke play combined score

Statistics
- Par: 72
- Length: 7,096 yards (6,489 m)
- Field: 37 two-man teams

Champion
- South Africa; Harold Henning & Gary Player
- 571 (−5)

The 1965 Canada Cup took place 30 September – 3 October at the Real Sociedad Hípica Española Club de Campo in Madrid, Spain. It was the 13th Canada Cup event, which became the World Cup in 1967. The tournament was a 72-hole stroke play team event with 37 teams. These were the same teams that had competed in 1964 but with the addition of Czechoslovakia, Monaco and Morocco. Each team consisted of two players from a country. The combined score of each team determined the team results. The South African team of Harold Henning and Gary Player won by eight strokes over the Spanish team of Ángel Miguel and Ramón Sota. The individual competition was won by Gary Player, who finished two shots ahead of Jack Nicklaus.

== Teams ==
Country	Players
Argentina	Roberto De Vicenzo and Elcido Nari
Australia	Kel Nagle and Peter Thomson
Austria	Oswald Gertenmaier and Josef Goricnik
Belgium	Donald Swaelens and Flory Van Donck
Brazil	José Maria Gonzalez and Mário Gonzalez
Canada	Wilf Homenuik and George Knudson
Chile	Anisio Araya and Enrique Orellana
Colombia	Alfonso Bohórquez and Miguel Sala
Czechoslovakia	Jiri Dvorak (a) and Miloslav Plodek (a)
Denmark	Jorgen Korfitzen and Henrik Lund
Egypt	Cherif El-Sayed Cherif and Mohamed Said Moussa
England	David Snell and Guy Wolstenholme
France	Jean Garaïalde and Jean-Claude Harismendy
Hawaii	Ted Makalena and Paul Scodeller
Ireland	Christy Greene and Ernie Jones
Italy	Alfonso Angelini and Luciano Grappasonni
Japan	Tadashi Kitta and Hideyo Sugimoto
Mexico	Antonio Cerdá and Margarito Martinez
Monaco	Jean Baptiste Ado and Jean-Charles Rey
Morocco	Meskine Hajaj and Omar Ben El-Harcha
Netherlands	Cees Cramer and Gerard de Wit
New Zealand	Frank Buckler and Bob Charles
Peru	Hugo Nari and Wilfredo Uculmana
Philippines	Ben Arda and Celestino Tugot
Portugal	Henrique Paulino and Manuel Ribeiro
Puerto Rico	Juan Gonzalez and Chi-Chi Rodríguez
Scotland	Eric Brown and John Panton
South Africa	Harold Henning and Gary Player
Spain	Ángel Miguel and Ramón Sota
Sweden	Åke Bergquist and Arne Werkell
Switzerland	Jacky Bonvin and Ronald Tingley
Taiwan	Chen Ching-Po and Hsieh Yung-yo
United States	Tony Lema and Jack Nicklaus
Uruguay	José Esmoris and Juan Sereda
Venezuela	Eduardo Miartus and Teobaldo Perez
Wales	Brian Huggett and Sid Mouland
West Germany	Herbert Becker and Heinz Fehring

The four British and Irish teams did not include any members of the 1965 Ryder Cup team. The Ryder Cup was played the following week and the team had a prior engagement to play in the Honda Foursomes Tournament which was contested at the same time as the Canada Cup.

Ado was representing Monaco, having played for France in 1958.

== Scores ==
Team

Place	Country	Score	To par
1	South Africa	142-138-139-152=571	−5
2	Spain	143-145-144-147=579	+3
3	United States	147-148-142-145=582	+6
T4	Canada	146-144-151-144=585	+9
T4	England	149-153-144-139=585	+9
6	Colombia	147-147-148-148=590	+14
7	Puerto Rico	148-154-145-146=593	+17
8	Taiwan	143-153-148-150=594	+18
T9	Argentina	147-153-149-146=595	+19
T9	Scotland	149-149-150-147=595	+19
11	Belgium	143-153-150-150=596	+20
T12	Hawaii	147-152-148-156=603	+27
T12	Italy	146-158-147-152=603	+27
14	Japan	147-155-153-150=605	+29
15	Mexico	155-153-153-146=607	+31
16	New Zealand	148-151-153-156=608	+32
17	Ireland	154-151-152-154=611	+35
18	France	149-156-156-154=615	+39
19	Egypt	156-158-147-158=619	+43
20	Wales	156-153-158-154=621	+45
21	Switzerland	155-157-156-157=625	+49
22	Philippines	158-157-161-152=628	+52
23	Peru	164-156-153-157=630	+54
24	Brazil	159-152-160-160=631	+55
25	Denmark	156-155-160-161=632	+56
T26	Monaco	157-160-158-160=635	+59
T26	Uruguay	158-157-163-157=635	+59
T28	Chile	168-153-162-153=636	+60
T28	West Germany	158-153-161-164=636	+60
30	Netherlands	157-155-172-159=643	+67
31	Venezuela	158-166-156-164=644	+68
32	Portugal	167-153-166-172=658	+82
33	Sweden	171-164-162-167=664	+88
34	Austria	168-170-172-175=685	+109
35	Morocco	172-178-167-171=688	+112
36	Czechoslovakia	183-190-179-191=743	+167
37	Australia	145-144-150-WD	

Peter Thomson of Australia withdrew during the final round.

International Trophy

Place	Player	Country	Score	To par
1	Gary Player	South Africa	70-69-68-74=281	−7
2	Jack Nicklaus	United States	71-72-71-70=284	−4
3	Ramón Sota	Spain	70-73-70-72=285	−3
T4	Chi-Chi Rodríguez	Puerto Rico	71-75-70-70=286	−2
T4	Miguel Sala	Colombia	70-73-73-70=286	−2
6	Harold Henning	South Africa	72-69-71-78=290	+2
T7	Eric Brown	Scotland	72-73-72-74=291	+3
T7	Roberto De Vicenzo	Argentina	70-75-75-71=291	+3
T7	George Knudson	Canada	70-73-77-71=291	+3
T7	Kel Nagle	Australia	70-70-78-73=291	+3
