= Christy Greene =

Irish golfer

Personal information
- Nationality: Ireland
- Born: 13 November 1926 Killincarrig, County Wicklow, Ireland
- Died: 20 December 1997 (aged 71) Dublin, Ireland

Career
- Sport: Golf
- Status: Professional
- Professional wins: 5

Best results in major championships
- Masters Tournament: DNP
- PGA Championship: DNP
- U.S. Open: DNP
- The Open Championship: T13: 1964

Christopher Greene (13 November 1926 – 20 December 1997) was an Irish professional golfer. He twice won the Irish PGA Championship and represented Ireland in the 1965 Canada Cup. His biggest individual success came when winning the 1965 Hennessy Tournament at Clandeboye Golf Club, County Down.

== Early life ==
Greene was born in Killincarrig, County Wicklow, near where Harry Bradshaw had been born.

== Golf career ==
Greene won the Irish PGA Championship in 1956 at Clandeboye and in 1968 at Knock. Playing with Ernie Jones he represented Ireland in the 1965 Canada Cup in Madrid. He also represented Ireland in the 1967 R.T.V. International Trophy at Edmondstown Golf Course, County Dublin.

Greene won the 1965 Hennessy Tournament at Clandeboye Golf Club, County Down. He led throughout with rounds of 69-69-68-69 for a 271 total and a three stroke win over Christy O'Connor Snr. He never won a major tournament outside Ireland but he reached the semi-final of the 1965 News of the World Matchplay, where he lost to the eventual winner, Neil Coles.

Greene was a regular competitor in the Open Championship, playing 13 times between 1951 and 1973. He made the cut 7 times and had a best finish of tied for 13th place in 1964.

Greene was at Portmarnock before moving to Kilcroney Golf and Country Sports Club in 1950, where he replaced Harry Bradshaw. In 1954 he moved to Milltown Golf Club, Dublin. Soon after moving to Milltown he was joint winner, with Arthur Lees, of the £500 Dubtex Tournament at Portmarnock.

== Professional wins (5) ==
This list may be inclomplete

- 1954 Dubtex Tournament (Ireland) (tie with Arthur Lees)
- 1956 Irish PGA Championship
- 1964 Irish Dunlop Tournament
- 1965 Hennessy Tournament
- 1968 Irish PGA Championship

== Results in major championships ==
Tournament	1951	1952	1953	1954	1955	1956	1957	1958	1959
The Open Championship	CUT					T36	CUT	T20	

Tournament	1960	1961	1962	1963	1964	1965	1966	1967	1968	1969
The Open Championship		T46		CUT	T13	T21	T30		T39	

Tournament	1970	1971	1972	1973
The Open Championship	CUT	CUT		CUT

Note: Greene only played in The Open Championship.

Did not play

CUT = missed the half-way cut
"T" indicates a tie for a place

== Team appearances ==
- World Cup (representing Ireland): 1965
- R.T.V. International Trophy (representing Ireland): 1967
