= Turnberry-B.O.A.C. Foursomes Tournament =

Tournament information
- Location: South Ayrshire, Scotland
- Established: 1969
- Course: Turnberry
- Month played: October/November
- Final year: 1970

Final champion
- Jimmy Martin and Roddy Carr

The Turnberry-B.O.A.C. Foursomes Tournament was a pro-am golf tournament played at Turnberry, South Ayrshire, Scotland. The event was held in 1969 and 1970. It had a similar format to the Gleneagles Hotel Foursomes Tournament which had finished in 1966. The tournament was sponsored by British Transport Hotels, the owners of Turnberry, and B.O.A.C. The 1970 final was delayed by a day because of bad weather.

== Winners ==
Year	Winners	Country	Margin of victory	Runners-up	Winner's share (£)	Ref
1969	Brian Huggett & Colin Cowdrey	Wales; England	2&1	(England) Peter Butler & (England) Bruce Marshall-Andrew	350 (pro)	
1970	Jimmy Martin & Roddy Carr	Ireland; Ireland	1 up	(Scotland) Ronnie Shade & (Scotland) Doug Smith	350 (pro)	
