= Damien McGrane =

Irish golfer (born 1971)

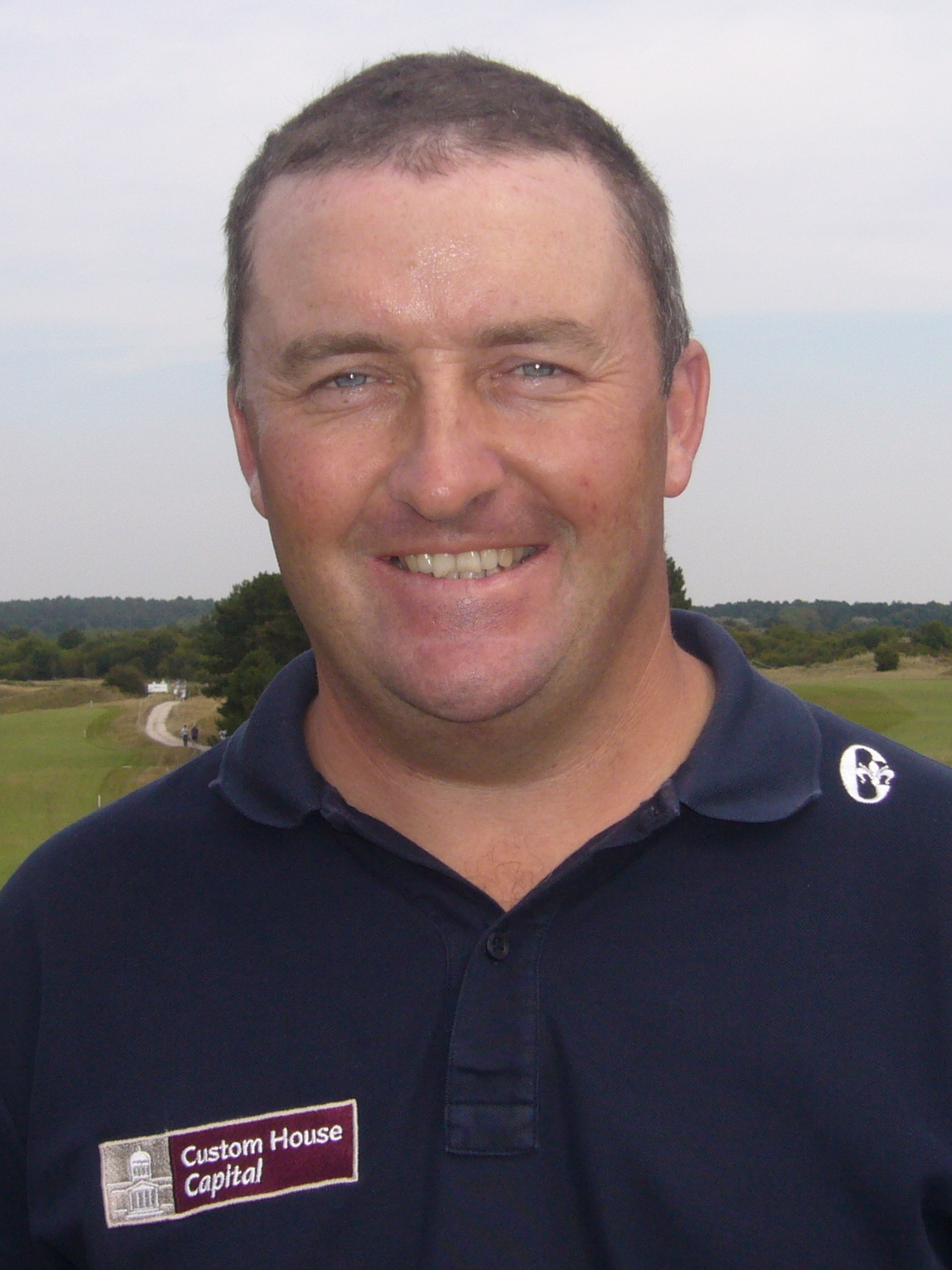
- McGrane in 2009

Personal information
- Nationality: Ireland
- Born: 13 April 1971 (age 55) Kells, County Meath, Ireland
- Height: 5 ft 8 in (1.73 m)

Career
- Sport: Golf
- Turned professional: 1991
- Former tour: European Tour
- Professional wins: 8

Number of wins by tour
- European Tour: 1
- Asian Tour: 1
- Other: 7

Best results in major championships
- Masters Tournament: DNP
- PGA Championship: DNP
- U.S. Open: DNP
- The Open Championship: CUT: 2008, 2009

Damien McGrane (born 13 April 1971) is an Irish professional golfer.

== Career ==
McGrane was born in Kells, County Meath, Ireland. He turned professional in 1991.

McGrane has had full status on the European Tour since 2003, and has earned over €5m in prize-money. He clinched his first European Tour Title on 20 April 2008 at the Volvo China Open, winning by nine strokes, and ended the 2008 season ranked in the top thirty of the Order of Merit for the first time.

He retired from the European Tour in 2015 after losing his card.

McGrane now plays regularly on the Irish PGA Regional tour. He won the Irish PGA Championship in 2016, 2019 and 2022.

== Professional wins (8) ==
=== European Tour wins (1) ===
No.	Date	Tournament	Winning score	Margin of victory	Runners-up
1	20 Apr 2008	Volvo China Open^{1}	−10 (68-69-68-73=278)	9 strokes	(England) Simon Griffiths, (France) Mike Lorenzo-Vera, (England) Oliver Wilson

^{1}Co-sanctioned by the Asian Tour

European Tour playoff record (0–1)

No.	Year	Tournament	Opponent	Result
1	2014	M2M Russian Open	(England) David Horsey	Lost to par on first extra hole

=== PGA MasterCard Tour wins (1) ===
- 1999 Wynyard Hall

=== Other wins (6) ===
- 1993 Irish PGA Assistants Championship
- 1994 Irish PGA Assistants Championship
- 1999 Irish PGA Southern Championship
- 2016 Irish PGA Championship
- 2019 Irish PGA Championship
- 2022 Irish PGA Championship

== Results in major championships ==
Tournament	2008	2009
The Open Championship	CUT	CUT

Note: McGrane only played in The Open Championship.
CUT = missed the half-way cut

== Team appearances ==
- PGA Cup (representing Great Britain and Ireland): 2000, 2017 (winners)
