= Cox Moore Tournament =

Golf tournament in England

Tournament information
- Location: England
- Established: 1961
- Month played: April
- Final year: 1964

Final champion
- Peter Butler

The Cox Moore Tournament was a professional golf tournament. The event was played in 1961, 1963 and 1964 and was sponsored by Long Eaton-based Cox Moore sweaters, who elected to move their sponsorship to horse racing in 1965.

== Winners ==
Year	Winner	Country	Venue	Score	Margin of victory	Runner-up	Winner's share (£)	Ref
1961	Ernie Jones	Ireland	Wollaton Park Golf Club (and Beeston Fields Golf Club)	270	2 strokes	(England) Peter Alliss	1,000	
1962: No tournament
1963	Brian Huggett	Wales	Wollaton Park Golf Club	276	1 stroke	(England) John Jacobs	750	
1964	Peter Butler	England	Sandwell Park Golf Club	279	1 stroke	(England) Bernard Hunt	750	
