= Honda Foursomes Tournament =

Tournament information
- Location: Mere, Cheshire, England
- Established: 1965
- Course(s): Mere Golf Club
- Month played: October
- Final year: 1965

Final champion
- Jimmy Hitchcock and Bill Large

Location in England

The Honda Foursomes Tournament was a professional golf tournament played at Mere Golf Club in Mere, Cheshire, England. The event was held just once, from 28 September to 2 October 1965, and had total prize money of £10,000. The event was sponsored by Honda.

Over 100 pairs played in the event. All matches were over 18 holes with extra holes played in the event of a tie. The first round on 28 September reduced the field to 64 pairs. The second round was played on 29 September, the third round on 30 September, the fourth round and quarter-finals on 1 October with the semi-final and final on 2 October. There was also a match for third and fourth places.

== Winners ==
Year	Winners	Country	Margin of victory	Runner-up	Winner's share (£)	Ref
1965	Jimmy Hitchcock & Bill Large	England; England	2 up	(England) Peter Alliss & (Republic of Ireland) Christy O'Connor Snr	1,000 (each)	
