= Letterkenny Golf Club =

Golf course in Letterkenny, Ireland

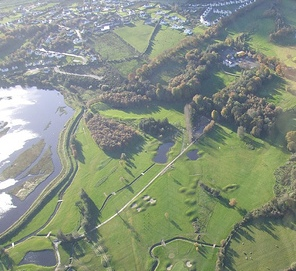
- Aerial view of the golf course at Barnhill (Lough Swilly can be seen to the left)

- Location within Ireland
- 54.964°N 7.684°W

Club information
- Location: Barnhill, Letterkenny, County Donegal, Ireland
- Established: 1913, 113 years ago
- Type: Public
- Total holes: 18
- Tournaments: Ladies Irish Open (1999)
- Website: www.letterkennygolfclub.com

Barnhill
- Designed by: Eddie Hackett; Declan Brannigan (redeveloper)
- Par: 72
- Length: 6,262 yards (5,726 m) +

Letterkenny Golf Club (often referred to as the Barnhill) is a golf club located on the banks of Lough Swilly in Letterkenny, County Donegal, Ireland. The club was founded in 1913.

== History ==
Golf began in the town many years before 1913 on rough ground near the Ramelton Road. Golfing facilities later moved to a 47-acre (190,000 m²) 9-hole course at Crievesmith, in Oldtown, in 1913 where the club was formed. Crievesmith was sold in 1965 for £3000 and the club moved to Barnhill and remain there to this day. The ground at Crievesmith is currently used for housing.

When the club moved to Barnhill an old farmhouse located on the land was used as the clubhouse. This farmhouse was extended in 1967 before new 10,000 sq ft (930 m^{2}) clubhouse was opened in 1999 with a restaurant and conference facilities.

In July 2007, the Declan Brannigan redesigned course was officially opened, addressing drainage problems which the old course had suffered from. The course has 18 holes and has views of Lough Swilly.

== Tournaments ==
In September 1999, Letterkenny Golf Club hosted the Ladies Irish Open, a tournament on the Ladies European Tour, which that year was known as the Donegal Irish Ladies Open. The event featured a strong international field including former world number one Laura Davies.

Sandrine Mendiburu of France won the title after a four-way sudden-death playoff, finishing tied on 286 (+2) with Davies, Raquel Carriedo of Spain and Elisabeth Esterl of Germany. Mendiburu secured victory on the second playoff hole, claiming her second career LET title.

Mendiburu took home the winner's share of €22,395.

== Scorecard ==
Barnhill Course – White tees

Hole	Name	Yards	Par	Hole	Name	Yards	Par
1	Hall Door	353	4	10	Cornagill	392	4
2	Glebe	493	5	11	Settlement	442	5
3	Lough Swilly	362	4	12	Sheep Hill	327	4
4	Sliabh Sneacht	364	4	13	Hunter's Home	187	3
5	Inishowen	147	3	14	Stack Yard	325	4
6	Hackett's Best	417	4	15	Candelabra	408	4
7	The Isles	481	5	16	Barnhill	135	3
8	Greenhill	164	3	17	Aughaninshin	381	4
9	Crievesmith	411	4	18	Stockade	473	5
Out		3,192	36	In		3,070	36
				Total		6,262	72

== Gallery ==
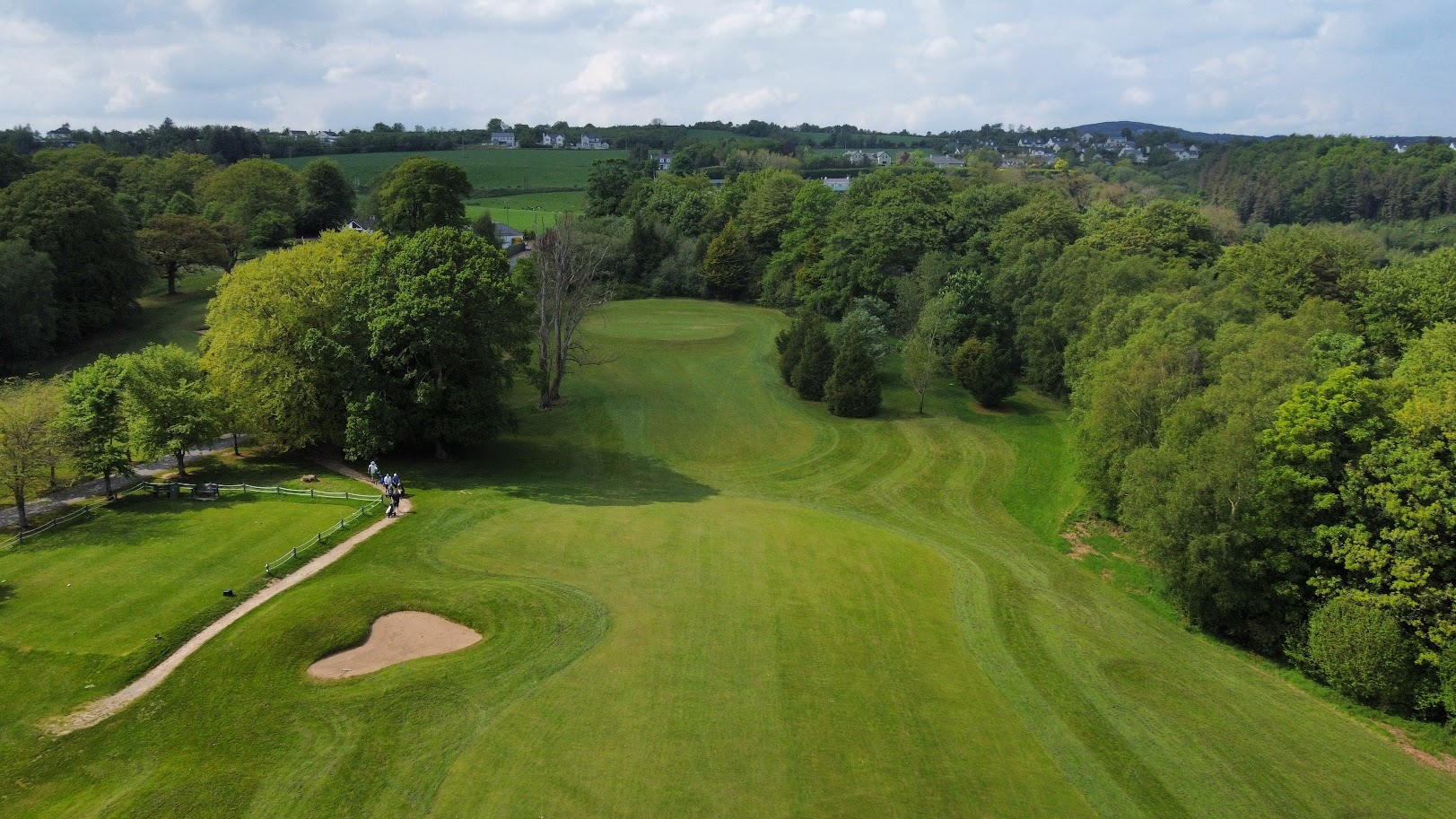
12th Hole

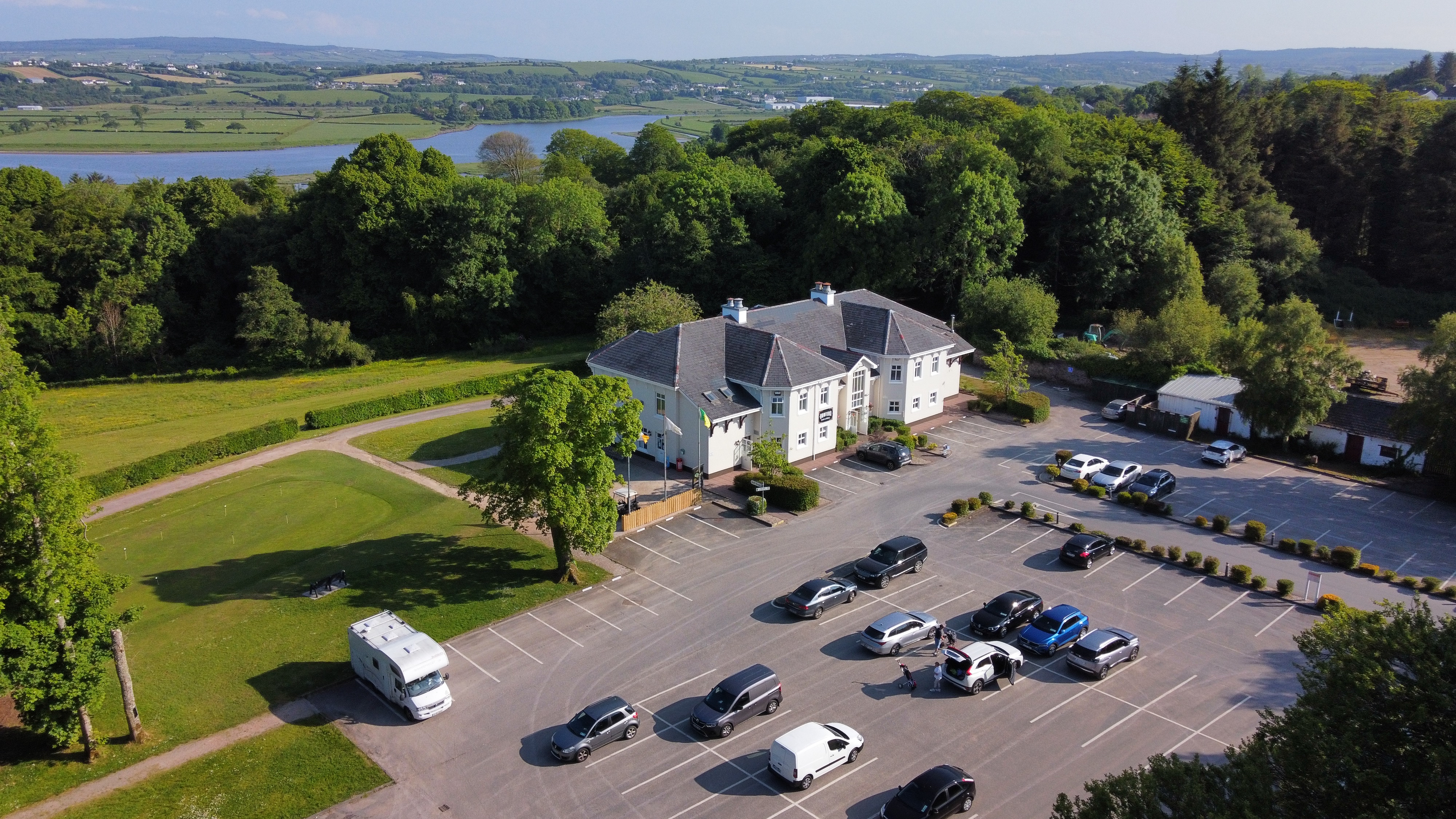
Clubhouse
