= Carroll's Number 1 Tournament =

Golf tournament in Ireland

Tournament information
- Location: Ireland
- Established: 1965
- Format: Stroke play
- Final year: 1968

Final champion
- Christy O'Connor Snr

The Carroll's Number 1 Tournament was a professional 72-hole stroke play golf tournament played in Ireland. It was inaugurated by sponsors Carroll's in 1965 as a means of providing more playing opportunities to Irish professionals, and a qualification route for the existing Carroll's International. It ran for four years, although it was abandoned in the first year due to bad weather, until it was replaced by the Carroll's Irish Match Play Championship in 1969.

== Winners ==
Year	Venue	Winner	Score	Ref
1968	Bundoran	(Republic of Ireland) Christy O'Connor Snr	291	
1967	Ballybunion	(Republic of Ireland) Jimmy Kinsella	283	
1966	Castletroy	(Republic of Ireland) Christy O'Connor Snr	278	
1965	Castletroy	Abandoned		
