= Tuam Golf Club =

Golf course and club in County Galway, Ireland

- Interactive map of Tuam Golf Club
- 53.494°N 8.836°W

Club information
- Location: Tuam, County Galway, Ireland
- Established: 1904
- Type: Members Club
- Tota holes: 18
- Website: Official website
- Designed by: Eddie Hackett
- Par: 72
- Length: 6138

Tuam Golf Club is a parkland course located in Tuam, County Galway, Ireland. Founded in 1904, it became an affiliated member of the Golfing Union of Ireland in 1940.

== History ==
The origins of golf in Tuam go back to the early 1900s when two local businessmen holidayed in the town of Harrogate in England. There, they became acquainted with the game, purchased clubs and balls and brought them back to Tuam. Initially located in the townland of Cloonascragh (on land owned by one of the two businessmen), Tuam Golf Club opened in 1904 with 60 members. In 1937 it relocated to the lands of the Kilgarriff family at Mayfield.

In the 1940s, Christy O'Connor Snr came to the club as a professional, offering golf lessons to the local community.

In the mid-1970s, the club moved to its current location at Barnacurragh, with the course designed by Eddie Hackett.

In 1991 a new clubhouse was constructed, with bar, restaurant, changing rooms and a pro-shop. Improvement works continued over the years with Christy O'Connor Jnr advising the club. Other development work undertaken between 2007 and 2009 was under the guidance of golf architect Ken Kearney.

Tuam Golf Club granted full membership to lady members in 1992. The course has hosted several championship events, including the Connacht GUI Club finals and Irish Open Boys Championship in 2015.

== Course ==
The course is Par 72, measuring 6138 meters, with most fairways being tree lined, with water features on three holes. The feature hole is the Par 3 15th hole.
