= R.T.V. International Trophy =

Tournament information
- Location: Ireland
- Established: 1967
- Courses: Edmondstown Golf Course; Cork Golf Club
- Month played: August
- Final year: 1969

Final champion
- Peter Butler

Locations

The R.T.V. International Trophy was a professional golf tournament. In its first year, 1967, there was a professional team tournament between the four home nations at Edmondstown Golf Course, County Dublin. The next year the event became an individual tournament played at Cork Golf Club, Little Island, Cork, Ireland. The individual event was held twice, in 1968 and 1969. The tournaments were sponsored by R.T.V. Rentals.

== Team event (1967) ==
The tournament was played on 25, 26 and 27 August with each team playing the other three. There were teams of 6 with 3 foursomes matches in the morning and 6 singles in the afternoon. All matches were over 18 holes. The total prize money was £3,480.

The teams were:

- England: Peter Alliss (Captain), Brian Barnes, Fred Boobyer, Neil Coles, Malcolm Gregson, Tony Grubb
- Scotland: John Panton (Captain), Harry Bannerman, Eric Brown, John Burns, Iain Clark, George Will
- Wales: Dai Rees (Captain), Richard Davies, Brian Huggett, Peter Jones, Hugh Lewis, Dave Thomas
- Ireland: Christy O'Connor Snr (Captain), Hugh Boyle, Christy Greene, Ernie Jones, Nicky Lynch, Paddy Skerritt

Brian Barnes played for England, although he later represented Scotland in team events.

The event was the second attempt to run a regular professional home nations tournament, but like the first attempt, the Llandudno International Golf Trophy in 1938, it was only run once. The winning captain in 1938, Percy Alliss, was the father of the winning captain in 1967, Peter Alliss. A similar format was used for the 1971 Double Diamond International.

=== Matches ===
Friday 25 August

Team	Score	Team	Score	Halved
(Republic of Ireland) Ireland	5	Scotland	2	2
England	4	Wales	3	2

Saturday 26 August

Team	Score	Team	Score	Halved
England	7	Scotland	1	1
(Republic of Ireland) Ireland	5	Wales	4	0

Sunday 27 August

Team	Score	Team	Score	Halved
Scotland	5	Wales	3	1
England	5	(Republic of Ireland) Ireland	3	1

=== Final table ===
Team	Matches		Individual games		
Team	Won	Lost	Won	Lost	Halved
England	3	0	16	7	4
(Republic of Ireland) Ireland	2	1	13	11	3
Scotland	1	2	8	15	4
Wales	0	3	10	14	3

== Winners (1968 and 1969) ==
Year	Winner	Country	Venue	Score	Margin of victory	Runner(s)-up	Winner's share (£)	Ref
1968	Tommy Horton	England	Cork Golf Club	271	3 strokes	(England) Peter Townsend	1,000	
1969	Peter Butler	England	Cork Golf Club	273	3 strokes	(England) Bernard Hunt (South Africa) Cobie Legrange	1,000	
