= Paddy McGuirk =

Irish former golfer

Personal information
- Nationality: Ireland
- Born: 23 June 1950 (age 76) Ireland

Career
- Sport: Golf
- Turned professional: 1966
- Former tour: European Tour
- Professional wins: 4

Number of wins by tour
- European Tour: 1
- Other: 3

Best results in major championships
- Masters Tournament: DNP
- PGA Championship: DNP
- U.S. Open: DNP
- The Open Championship: T32: 1976

Paddy McGuirk (born 23 June 1950) is an Irish former golfer. He won the professional Carroll's International tournament at the 1973 European Tour. McGuirk also won the professional Carroll's Irish Match Play Championship tournament at the 1969 and 1982 Southern Ireland Championship.

McGuirk began golfing with his father, Michael McGuirk, at the age of 15. He was a professional golfer since 1966. McGuirk won the Aer Lingus Irish Professional Championship at the Irish PGA Championship in 1976. He retired his professional golfing in 2021.

== Professional wins (4) ==
=== European Tour wins (1) ===
No.	Date	Tournament	Winning score	Margin of victory	Runner-up
1	24 Jun 1973	Carroll's International	−19 (67-72-72-66=277)	2 strokes	(South Africa) Hugh Baiocchi

=== Other wins (3) ===
- 1969 Carroll's Irish Match Play Championship
- 1976 Aer Lingus Irish Professional Championship
- 1982 Carroll's Irish Match Play Championship
