= Carroll's =

Irish cigarette manufacturer

P.J. Carroll & Company Ltd.
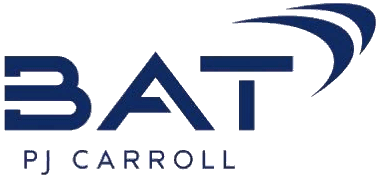
- Company type: Subsidiary
- Industry: Tobacco
- Founded: 1824; 202 years ago in Dundalk
- Founder: Patrick James Carroll
- Headquarters: Sandyford, Ireland
- Products: Cigarettes
- Parent: British American Tobacco
- Website: pjcarroll.ie

P. J. Carroll & Company Limited, often called Carroll's, is an Irish manufacturing company of tobacco. Having been established in 1824, P.J. Carroll is the oldest tobacco manufacturer in the country, and currently a subsidiary of British American Tobacco.

Its cigarette brands were among the best selling in Ireland in the twentieth century. Its factory was for decades the largest employer in Dundalk.

== History ==
Patrick James Carroll (b. 1803) completed his apprenticeship as a tobacconist in 1824 and opened a shop in Dundalk, later also manufacturing cigars. He moved to Liverpool in England in the 1850s. His son Vincent Stannus Carroll expanded the firm in the later 19th century. His son James Marmion Carroll moved to a house outside Dundalk. A second factory was opened, in Liverpool, in 1923. The company went public in 1934.

A purpose-built factory opened in 1970. Designed by Ronnie Tallon of Michael Scott and Partners, it was described by the journalist Frank McDonald as "way ahead of anything else in Ireland at the time". In 1974, to mark the 150th anniversary of its founding, P.J. Carroll published an illustrated booklet by the writer James Plunkett: P. J. Carroll & Co. Ltd, Dublin & Dundalk - A Retrospect, outlining the development of the company in its historical context.

Carroll's was acquired by Rothmans in 1990; Rothmans was acquired by British American Tobacco Plc in 1998. The company's share of the Irish tobacco market is around 17%. In 2002, the Dundalk site was sold for €16.4m to the Department of Education and repurposed for the campus of Dundalk Institute of Technology. Carroll's rented back a small section for its remaining factory operations, until finally ceasing its Dundalk operations in 2008. Carrolls remains an Irish company with deep connections to hundreds of retirees and nearly 40 staff based in their Dublin offices.

In 2013, some lawmakers suggested PJ Carroll should be prohibited from speaking with lawmakers on the basis of the WHO Framework Convention on Tobacco Control (FCTC). PJ Carroll comes under the definition of Tobacco Industry as set out by the FCTC, but the FCTC does not prohibit engagement between tobacco companies and public representatives, but puts in place strict rules relating to transparency.

== Brands ==
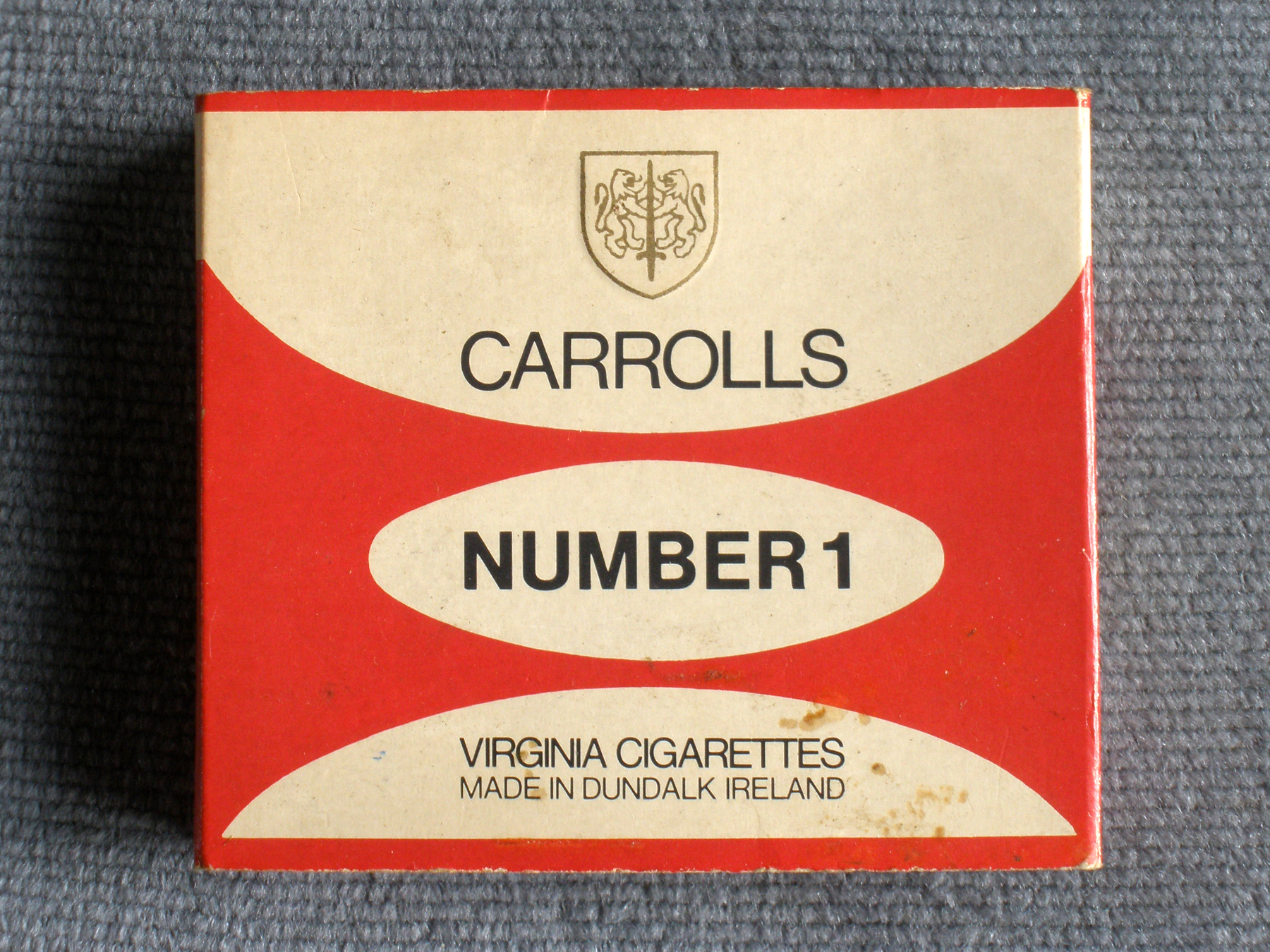
Carrolls Number 1 cigarettes

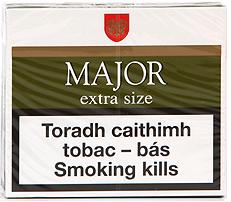
Major cigarettes

- "Carrolls Number 1", its first filter cigarette, was launched in 1958.
- "Carrolls Additive Free* Red" and "Carrolls Additive Free* Blue" was launched in 2013 as additive free* cigarettes started to gain popularity across Western Europe. (*No additives in the tobacco blend does NOT mean a less harmful cigarette)
- "Pall Mall" is also one of PJ Carroll's brands.
- "Vogue" is PJ Carroll's "premium" cigarette brand.
- "Major"

Of international brands, Carroll's manufactured Rothmans and Dunhill and distributed Winfield, and Lucky Strike

- "Sweet Afton", launched in 1919, was named after "'Afton Waters" by Robert Burns, whose sister Agnes was buried in a graveyard opposite the old Carrolls factory in Church Street, Dundalk. Sweet Afton cigarettes were discontinued in the Autumn of 2011.

== Sponsorship ==
Carroll's was a major sponsor of sport in Ireland until restrictions were imposed on tobacco advertising. The company had naming rights over the GAA All Stars Awards (1971–78); and Irish showjumping horses of the 1970s and 80s, such as "Carroll's Boomerang".

In golf, Carroll's was the sponsor of several professional tournaments including the Carroll's International (1963 to 1974), the Carroll's Number 1 Tournament (1965 to 1968), the Carroll's Irish Match Play Championship (1969 to 1982), and most notably the revived Irish Open from 1975 to 1993.

Velo, Carroll's nicotine pouch brand, is a partner of the Electric Picnic music and arts festival in 2025.

== Arms ==
Coat of arms of Carroll's

Notes
Granted 9 November 1967.
Escutcheon
Gules two lions combatant Or supporting a sword proper pommel and hilt of the second in the nombril point two tobacco leaves in saltire also of the second and in base a bezant.
Motto
Ad Maiora Tendere
