= Bill Large =

English golfer

Personal information
- Full name: William Large
- Nationality: England
- Born: 2 July 1937 Liverpool, Lancashire, England
- Died: 15 March 2006 (aged 68) Hertfordshire, England

Career
- Sport: Golf
- Status: Professional
- Professional wins: 3

Best results in major championships
- Masters Tournament: DNP
- PGA Championship: DNP
- U.S. Open: DNP
- The Open Championship: T25: 1971

William Large (2 July 1937 – 15 March 2006) was an English professional golfer. He was born in Liverpool, where his father, Bill Large, Sr., was professional at the Allerton Municipal course. His father had won the Northern Professional Championship in 1928.

Large's first important win was in the Honda Foursomes Tournament in 1966 where he and his partner, Jimmy Hitchcock, beat the experienced pair of Peter Alliss and Christy O'Connor Snr in the final. He was joint winner of two individual tournaments, the 1966 Martini International and the 1968 Alcan International.

== Tournament wins ==
- 1965 Honda Foursomes Tournament (with Jimmy Hitchcock)
- 1966 Martini International (shared title with Peter Alliss)
- 1968 Alcan International (shared title with Christy O'Connor Snr)

== Results in major championships ==
Tournament	1958	1959	1960	1961	1962	1963	1964	1965	1966	1967	1968	1969	1970	1971	1972
The Open Championship	T39				CUT	CUT	CUT	T31	CUT	CUT	CUT	CUT	CUT	T25	CUT

Note: Large only played in The Open Championship.

Did not play

CUT = missed the half-way cut (3rd round cut in 1968 and 1970 Open Championships)
"T" indicates a tie for a place
