= Sweet Afton (cigarette) =

Irish cigarette brand

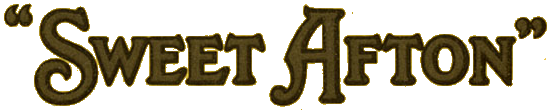

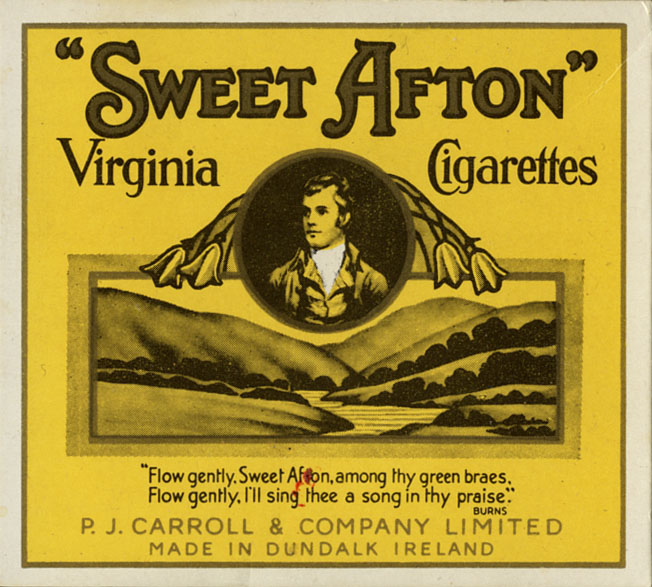
- Product type: Cigarette
- Current owner: British American Tobacco
- Produced by: British American Tobacco
- Introduced: 1919
- Discontinued: 2011; 15 years ago
- Markets: Ireland, Germany
- Previous owners: P.J. Carroll & Co.

Sweet Afton was an Irish brand of short, unfiltered cigarettes made with Virginia tobacco and produced by P.J. Carroll & Co., Dundalk, Ireland, now a subsidiary of British American Tobacco.

== History ==
The Sweet Afton brand was launched by Carroll's in 1919 to celebrate the link between Dundalk and the national poet of Scotland, Robert Burns. Burns' eldest sister, Agnes, lived in Dundalk from 1817 until her death in 1834 and was buried in the cemetery of St. Nicholas's Church in the town. Carroll's thought that the brand would only be successful in Scotland if the carton simply had an image of Burns, or Scottish name on the packet, so the people of Dundalk were canvassed and the name Sweet Afton was chosen. The name is taken from Burns' poem "Sweet Afton", which itself takes its title from the poem's first stanza:

Flow gently, sweet Afton, amang thy green braes
Flow gently, I’ll sing thee a song in thy praise
My Mary’s asleep by they murmuring stream
Flow gently, sweet Afton, disturb not her dream

A larger version of the cigarette was also marketed under the brand name Afton Major. This name served as inspiration for Carroll's later Major brand of tipped cigarettes.

In 2011 British American Tobacco ceased manufacturing Sweet Afton cigarettes. The text "Thank you for your loyalty, unfortunately Sweet Afton will not be available in the future. However Major, our other Irish brand with similar tobacco will still be widely available for purchase" was written on a sticker that was put on the last line of packs, before it went out of production.

== In popular culture ==
The brand proved particularly popular with post World War II Rive Gauche Paris. It was reputed to be Jean-Paul Sartre's preferred cigarette, and also featured prominently in Louis Malle's film Le Feu Follet and a number of other Nouvelle Vague films. Margot Tenenbaum (played by Gwyneth Paltrow) from Wes Anderson's 2001 film The Royal Tenenbaums also smokes Sweet Aftons, as does Thomas Shelby in Peaky Blinders. They are also the favoured brand of Gerhard Selb, the eponymous private investigator in the trilogy by Bernhard Schlink. The cigarette is also referenced in the 2021 Beatles documentary Get Back in episode 3 during the rooftop concert when Debbie, the Apple receptionist, offers one to Jimmy, the doorman. The brand is also stated to have inspired Tony Iommi when writing the Black Sabbath song "Sweet Leaf".
