= Michael McGeady =

Irish professional golfer (born 1978)

Personal information
- Full name: Michael McGeady
- Nationality: Ireland
- Born: 11 May 1978 (age 48) Derry, Northern Ireland
- Height: 6 ft 2 in (1.88 m)
- Weight: 230 lb (100 kg; 16 st)
- Spouse: Lisa (m. 2008)

Career
- Sport: Golf
- Turned professional: 2005
- Former tours: Challenge Tour; PGA EuroPro Tour
- Professional wins: 2

Number of wins by tour
- Challenge Tour: 1
- Other: 1

Michael McGeady (born 11 May 1978) is an Irish professional golfer.

== Career ==
In 2005, McGeady turned professional. He tied for second in the 2006 Ireland Ryder Cup Challenge and secured his first win as a professional in 2008 at the SWALEC Wales Challenge. In October 2013, he won the Irish PGA Championship at Roganstown.

== Professional wins (2) ==
=== Challenge Tour wins (1) ===
No.	Date	Tournament	Winning score	Margin of victory	Runner-up
1	27 Jul 2008	SWALEC Wales Challenge	−4 (71-74-71-68=284)	Playoff	(Sweden) Joel Sjöholm

Challenge Tour playoff record (1–0)

No.	Year	Tournament	Opponent	Result
1	2008	SWALEC Wales Challenge	(Sweden) Joel Sjöholm	Won with par on second extra hole

=== Other wins (1) ===
No.	Date	Tournament	Winning score	Margin of victory	Runners-up
1	13 Oct 2013	Irish PGA Championship	−9 (66-72-70-67=275)	1 stroke	(Republic of Ireland) Cian McNamara, (Northern Ireland) Damian Mooney

== Team appearances ==
Amateur

- European Amateur Team Championship (representing Ireland): 2005
