= Eddie Hackett =

Irish golf course architect (1910–1996)

Eddie Hackett (1910–1996) was an Irish golf course architect.

== Early life ==
Eddie Hackett was born in Dublin, Ireland in 1910. As a boy he suffered from tuberculosis, the effects of which left him without the strength or stamina to play more active sports. He began playing golf with his father.

== Career ==
As a teenager, Hackett got a job at his home club, the Royal Dublin. By the 1930s, he had worked his way up as a golf professional, making clubs and competing in tournaments. In 1939, he became the head golf professional at Portmarnock Golf Club.

=== Design philosophy ===
Unlike better-known golf course architects among Hackett's contemporaries such as Pete Dye and Robert Trent Jones, who commonly moved tons of soil to create their courses, Hackett worked like the architects of a bygone era, laying out a course on the land as he found it. As Hackett said himself, "I find that nature is the best architect . . . I try to dress up what the Good Lord provides".

While his designs show his appreciation of the classic Scottish links where he refined his game, his own designs rarely include the forced carries or the blind shots sometimes found on older links such as Carnoustie or Royal Troon. The majority of Hackett's courses are true links courses, defined by having been built on rolling, sandy ground adjacent to the sea, with native fescue grasses and few if any trees. This "linksland" (a word comes from the Old English 'hlinc' = rising ground) is ill-suited for farming or commercial use, and it was on linksland that the game of golf was developed over 500 years. Hackett also designed or revised a handful of parkland courses (inland, built on soil and frequently wooded).

== Courses ==
Below is a partial list of courses which Eddie Hackett designed or modified.

- Ashford Castle
- Ardee
- Athenry*
- Ballina*
- Ballinrobe Golf Club
- Ballyliffin Golf Club (The Old Links)
- Bantry Bay Golf Club
- Beaverstown Golf Club
- Beech Park Golf Club
- Blacklion Golf Club
- Carne (Belmullet)
- Ceann Sibeal Golf Links
- Charlesland Golf Club
- Clonmel
- Connemara
- Donegal (Murvagh)
- Dooks
- Dunmore Demesne
- Elmgreen
- Enniscorthy
- Enniscrone
- Hollystown Golf Club
- Kilkeel Golf Club
- Letterkenny Golf Club
- Magheramagorgan links
- Mahon Golf Course
- Malahide
- Old Conna Golf Club
- Oughterard Golf Club
- Nenagh Golf Club*
- Rosapenna*
- Ring of Kerry
- Stepaside Public Golf Course
- Stackstown Golf Club
- Strabane Golf Club
- Tuam Golf Club
- Waterville
- West Waterford

(* Modified existing design)
