= Elm Park and Isaac Sprague Memorial Tower =

- U.S. National Register of Historic Places
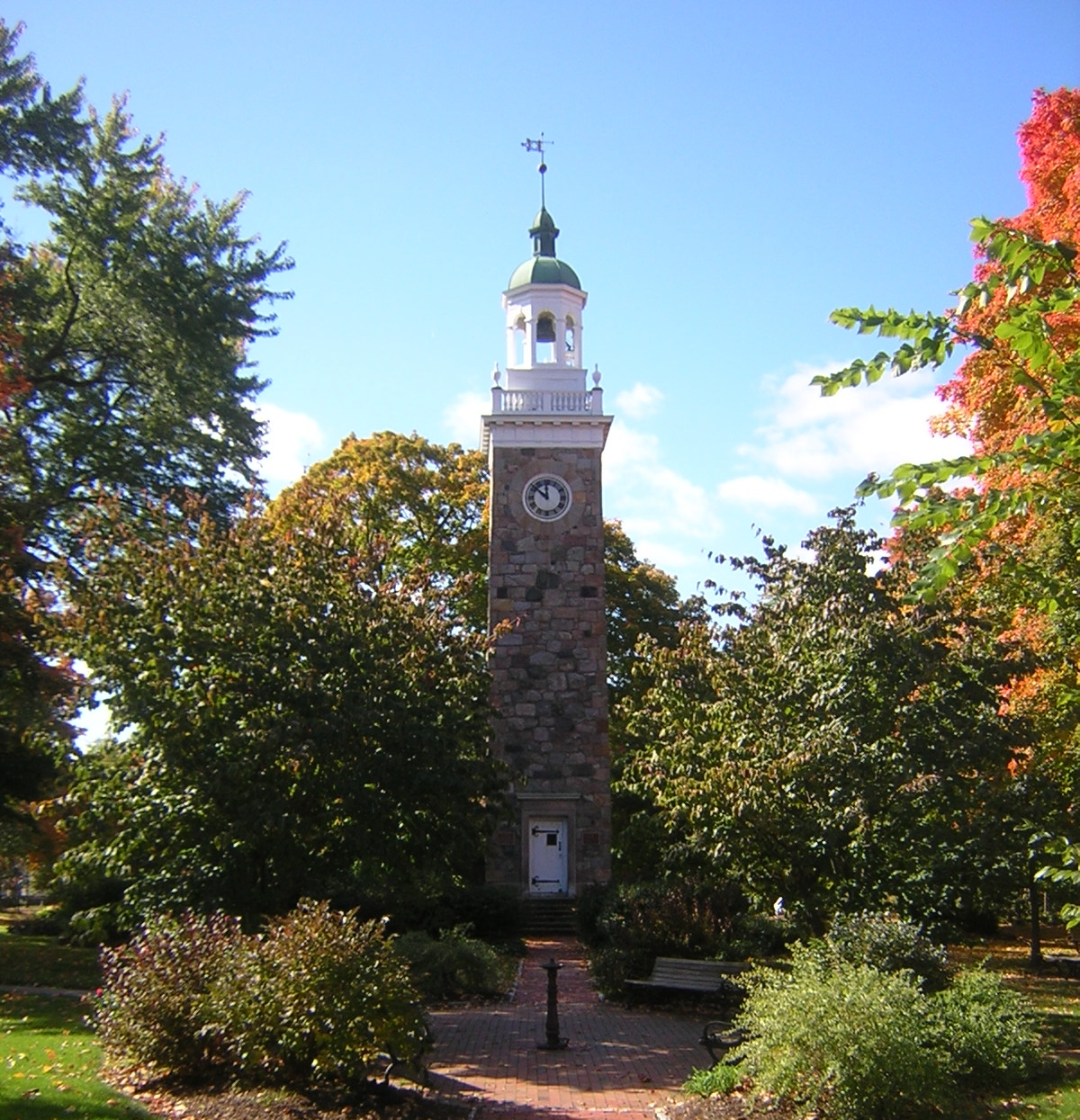

- Location within Massachusetts Location within the United States
- Location: Wellesley, Massachusetts
- Coordinates: 42°18′45″N 71°16′29.5″W
- Area: 1.24 acres (0.50 ha)
- Built: 1928
- Architect: Proctor, Benjamin Jr.; et al.
- Architectural style: Colonial Revival
- NRHP reference No.: 07000511
- Added to NRHP: June 5, 2007

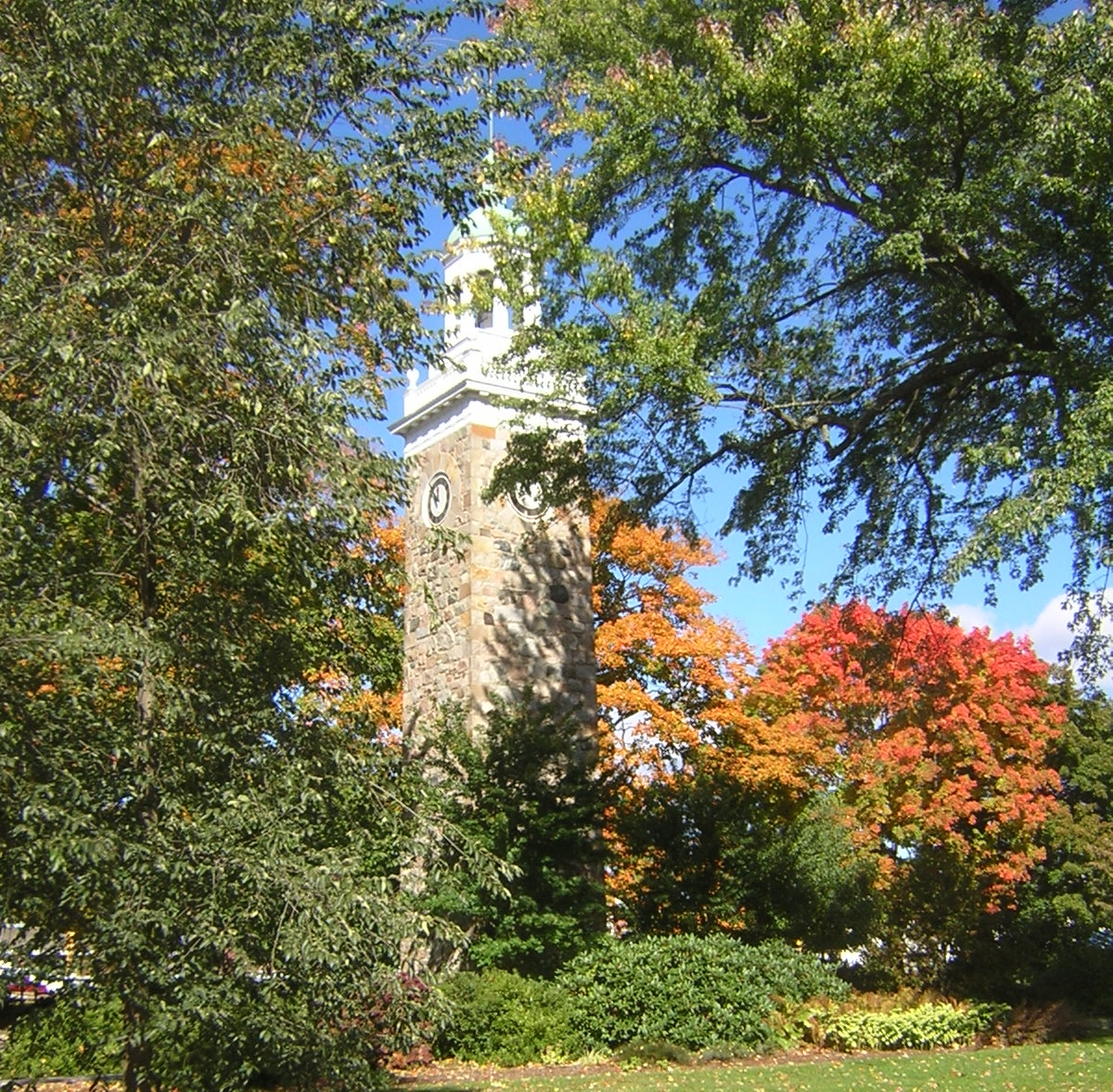

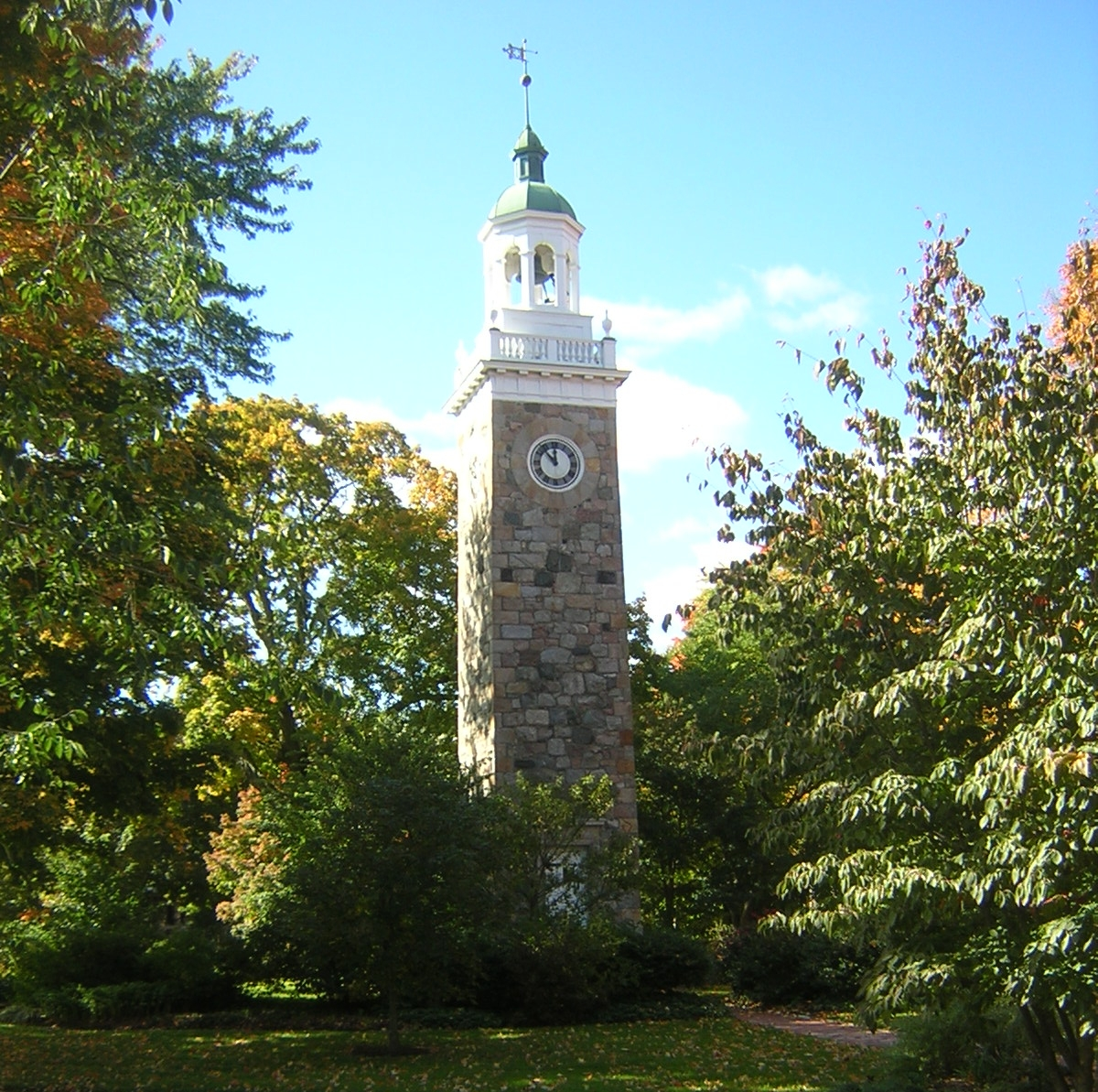

Elm Park, also known as Clocktower Park, is a historic park near the junction of Massachusetts Route 16 and Massachusetts Route 9 in the Wellesley Hills section of Wellesley, Massachusetts. It is a triangular parcel of 1.24 acres (0.50 ha), laid out for passive recreation. Its focal point is the 75-foot (23 m) brick and masonry Sprague Tower, designed by Benjamin Proctor, Jr., and built in 1928 to house a clock and bell given to the town in 1874. A portion of the now-defunct Cochituate Aqueduct passes through the park. Land for the park was acquired in 1908 by the town with funds raised by the community; the clock and bell were the gift of John Shaw. Isaac Sprague, for whom the tower is named, sat on the committee which oversaw its construction, and donated materials for that purpose.

The park was listed on the National Register of Historic Places in 2007.

== See also ==
- National Register of Historic Places listings in Norfolk County, Massachusetts

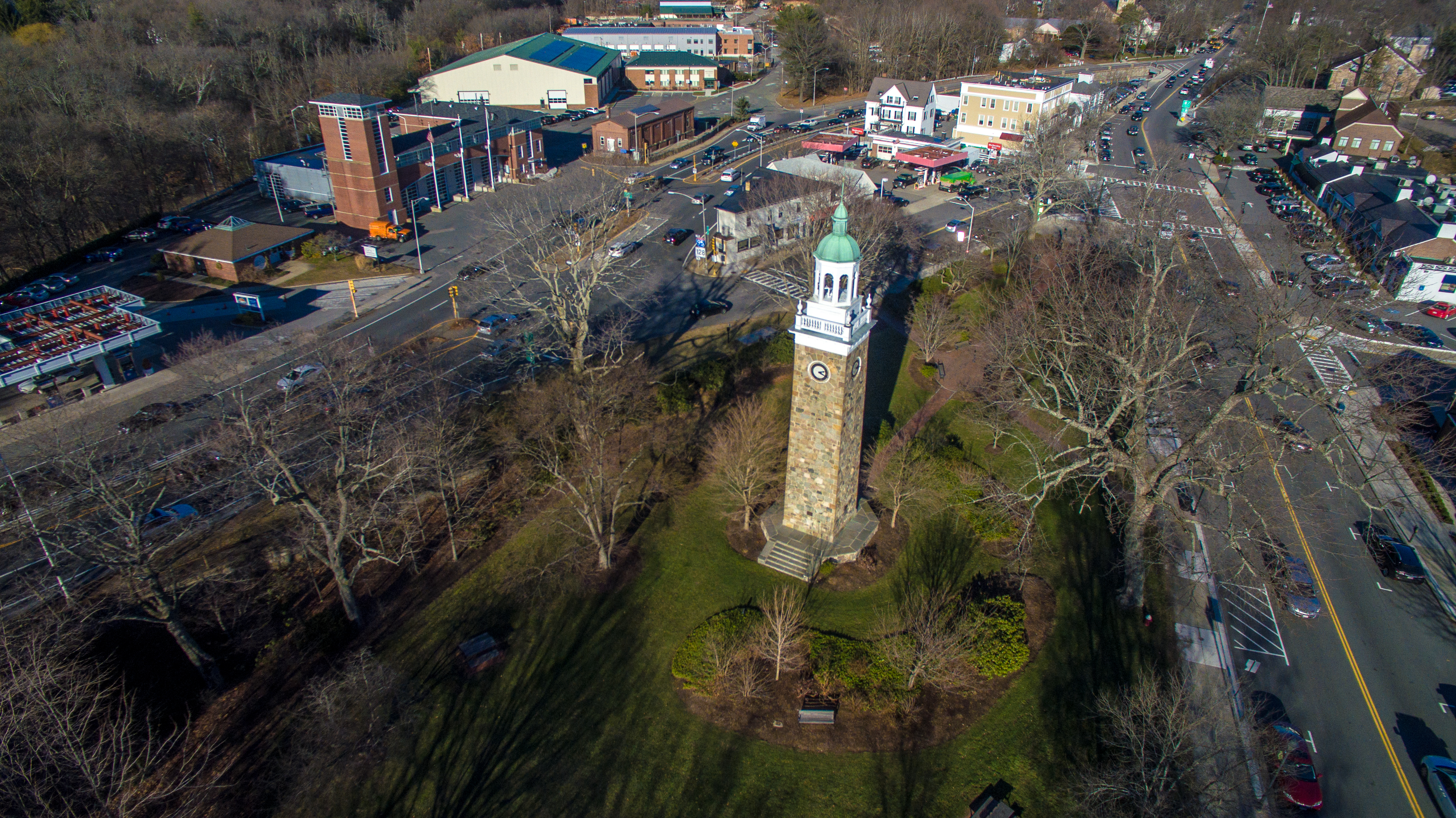
Elm Park and Sprague Memorial Tower
