= Norman Drew =

Northern Irish professional golfer (1932–2023)

Personal information
- Full name: Norman Vico Drew
- Nationality: Northern Ireland
- Born: 25 May 1932 Belfast, Northern Ireland
- Died: 13 August 2023 (aged 91)
- Height: 5 ft 9 in (1.75 m)
- Weight: 189 lb (86 kg; 13.5 st)

Career
- Sport: Golf
- Turned professional: 1953
- Former tour: European Seniors Tour
- Professional wins: 7

Best results in major championships
- Masters Tournament: DNP
- PGA Championship: DNP
- U.S. Open: DNP
- The Open Championship: T15: 1957

Norman Vico Drew (25 May 1932 – 13 August 2023) was a Northern Irish professional golfer. He had a successful amateur career, winning a number of Irish championships and playing in the 1953 Walker Cup. In the 1959 season, he won the Yorkshire Evening News Tournament and played in the Ryder Cup. Drew later represented Ireland in the Canada Cup (later known as the World Cup), becoming the first golfer to play in the Walker Cup, Ryder Cup and Canada Cup. He was renowned for his short game.

== Early life ==
Drew was born on 25 May 1932 in Belfast, Northern Ireland. He started his golfing career at Balmoral Golf Club in Belfast, before the family moved to Bangor, County Down in 1948. In 1947 and 1948, he won an open boys event at Donaghadee, and in 1948 he reached the last-16 of the Boys Amateur Championship at Kilmarnock (Barassie). In 1949, he won the inaugural Ulster Boys' Amateur Open Championship at Royal Belfast, beating John Glover at the 38th hole of the final. In the same year, he reached the final of the Boys Amateur Championship at St Andrews, losing to Harry MacAnespie 3&2 in the 36-hole final.

== Amateur career ==
Drew reached the semi-finals of the 1950 Irish Amateur Close Championship, losing to Brendan Herlihy, and soon afterwards won the North of Ireland Amateur Open Championship at Portrush, beating Jackson Taggart at the 19th of the final. Taggart was 4 up with 8 holes to play and then dormie two, but Drew won the next three holes. Drew qualified for the 1951 Open Championship at Portrush. A first round 75 put him well up the field but a second round 88 meant he missed the cut by 9 strokes.

Drew had a remarkable run of success in 1952. In April, he reached the final of the West of Ireland Amateur Open Championship at Rosses Point, losing to Joe Brown in the 36-hole final. Drew was 5 down after 6 holes and although he made a good recovery, he lost 2&1. In early June, he won the East of Ireland Amateur Open Championship at County Louth, was a score of 306, three ahead of the field. Later in June, he won the Irish Amateur Open Championship at Portrush, beating Cecil Beamish 5&4 in the final. In July, he won the North of Ireland Amateur Open Championship at Portrush, beating Billy Meharg 8&7 in the 36-hole final. The following month, he reached the final of the South of Ireland Amateur Open Championship at Lahinch, but lost to Michael Power by one hole in the 36-hole final. His one failure came in September at the Irish Amateur Open Championship at Royal Belfast, where he lost at the last-16 stage. In late September he made his debut in the Men's Home Internationals at Troon.

In 1953 the Men's Home Internationals were moved to an earlier date than usual, in June, at Killarney, the week before the Irish Amateur Open Championship which was also played there. In the Home Internationals, Drew won all his three singles matches and was undefeated in the foursomes. He then won the Irish Amateur Open beating Billy O'Sullivan 4&3 in the final. His second success in the championship came immediately before the selection of the final five players for the 1953 Walker Cup team. Drew was selected and at 21, he was the youngest member of the side. Before the match, Drew played in the Canadian Amateur Championship at Kanawaki, Montreal, losing in the quarter-finals to Don Cherry. The Walker Cup match was played at the Kittansett Club in Massachusetts, the United States winning 9–3. Drew was not selected for the foursomes and lost his singles match 9&7 against Don Cherry, having been 7 down after the first 18 holes. He also played in the U.S. Amateur but lost in the first round. Drew turned professional in November 1953, becoming an assistant to Sam Bacon at County Armagh.

== Professional career ==
In 1954, Sam Bacon moved to Knock Golf Club and Drew also left County Armagh, moving to Rossmore, before becoming an assistant at the North West Golf Club, Lisfannon, later in the year. In early 1956, Drew became the professional at Strabane golf club, which was in the process of moving to a new course. The move was to cause problems for Drew, since he had failed to serve a full three years as an assistant professional, although he satisfied Irish PGA rules which only required two years. He therefore became ineligible to play in British PGA events. In 1957, Drew became an assistant again, to Sam Bacon at Knock, but it was only in early 1958 that he was reinstated as a member of the British PGA. In 1958, Drew was a joint winner, with Harry Bradshaw, of the Irish Dunlop Tournament.

1959 was Drew's first full season on the British circuit and was to be his most successful, culminating with the Ryder Cup at Eldorado Golf Club, California, in November. Seven members of the 10-man British team were chosen using a Ryder Cup points system based on performances during the 1959 season. The first event was the PGA Close Championship starting on 8 April with the final event being the Irish Hospitals Tournament finishing on 12 July. The remaining three members of the team were selected by the P.G.A. tournament committee in late September, after the Dunlop Masters. Drew started with top-10 finishes in the PGA Close Championship, the Spalding Tournament and the Dunlop Tournament and then finished fourth in the Swallow-Penfold Tournament. After winning the Irish Dunlop Tournament, he missed the cut at the Daks Tournament but then has his first major British success, winning the Yorkshire Evening News Tournament, four strokes ahead of Peter Alliss, Harold Henning and Peter Thomson. Drew was then 35th in the Open Championship and 14th in the Irish Hospitals Tournament to finish in sixth place in the rankings and gain his place in the team. The season continued with Drew playing in the Amateurs–Professionals Match, winning the Irish Professional Championship and finishing joint runner-up in the Dunlop Masters behind Christy O'Connor Snr and level with Joe Carr. The 1959 Ryder Cup was the last in which 36-hole matches were played. Drew became the first British ex-Walker Cup golfer to play in the Ryder Cup. He did not play in the foursomes on the first day but halved his singles match against Doug Ford. Drew was four down after nine holes but recovered and was only one down at lunch. In the afternoon, he was one down playing the last. At the 470-yard par-4, he hit a wood to 15 feet and holed the putt.

Drew represented Ireland in the Canada Cup at Portmarnock in 1960 and at Puerto Rico in 1961. Playing with Christy O'Connor, they finished in fourth place in both events. He became the first golfer to play in the Walker Cup, Ryder Cup and Canada Cup. He had some success in Irish events. He lost in a three-way playoff for the 1965 Irish Professional Championship, O'Connor winning the title. He won the Ulster Professional Championship for the first time in 1966. In 1969, he was a joint runner-up in the Gallaher Ulster Open, again behind O'Connor. His second win in the Ulster championship came in 1972 and he won the Benson & Hedges (Ulster) match-play championship in 1983.

Drew held a number of professional positions. In 1960 he left Knock to become the professional at Ralston Golf Club near Glasgow. During his time there, he was runner-up in the 1964 Cutty Sark Tournament, seven strokes behind John Panton. He left Ralston in 1964 and was briefly at Rossmore before moving to Bradshaws Brae Range near Newtownards in 1966. In 1973, he moved to Malone Golf Club and then to Bangor Golf Club in 1983.

Later Drew competed on the European Seniors Tour for a number of years from the start of the tour in 1992 even though, at sixty, he was ten years past the minimum age. His best finish was a tie for fourth place in the 1992 Collingtree Homes Seniors Classic. He tied for ninth place in the 1993 Senior British Open despite a last round 80.

== Personal life ==
Drew was married to Valerie and had two children, Heather and Gordon. Gordon Drew is also a professional golfer, currently at Donaghadee Golf Club, County Down, Northern Ireland.

Drew died in August 2023 at age 91.

== Amateur wins ==
- 1949 Ulster Boys' Open Championship
- 1950 North of Ireland Amateur Open Championship
- 1952 East of Ireland Amateur Open Championship, Irish Amateur Open Championship, North of Ireland Amateur Open Championship
- 1953 Irish Amateur Open Championship

== Professional wins (7) ==
- 1958 Irish Dunlop Tournament (tie with Harry Bradshaw)
- 1959 Irish Dunlop Tournament, Yorkshire Evening News Tournament, Irish PGA Championship
- 1966 Ulster Professional Championship
- 1972 Ulster Professional Championship
- 1983 Ulster Matchplay Professional Championship

== Results in major championships ==
Tournament	1951	1952	1953	1954	1955	1956	1957	1958	1959
The Open Championship	CUT			T20			T15	T20	T35

Tournament	1960	1961	1962	1963	1964	1965	1966	1967	1968	1969	1970	1971
The Open Championship	CUT		CUT	CUT	T40	CUT	CUT		CUT	CUT	CUT	CUT

Note: Drew only played in The Open Championship.

Did not play

CUT = missed the half-way cut (3rd round cut in 1970 Open Championship)
"T" indicates a tie for a place

== Team appearances ==
Amateur

- Walker Cup (representing Great Britain & Ireland): 1953
- Men's Home Internationals (representing Ireland): 1952, 1953

Professional

- Ryder Cup (representing Great Britain): 1959
- Canada Cup (representing Ireland): 1960, 1961
- Amateurs–Professionals Match (representing the Professionals): 1959 (winners)
