= Cork Golf Club =

Golf club in Little Island, Cork, Ireland

- Location in Ireland
- 51.901445°N 8.354246°W

Club information
- Location: Castleview, Little Island, Cork, Ireland
- Established: 1888, 138 years ago
- Type: Private
- Tota holes: 18
- Tournaments: Irish Open (1932)
- Website: corkgolfclub.ie

Cork Golf Club
- Designed by: Alister MacKenzie
- Par: 72
- Length: 6,813 yards (6,230 m)

Cork Golf Club is a golf club located in Little Island, Cork, Ireland.

== History ==
The club, founded in 1888, hosted the 1932 Irish Open, won by Alf Padgham and the 1932 England–Ireland Professional Match.

It held the 1964 Jeyes Tournament, the 1965 Carroll's International and the R.T.V. International Trophy in 1968 and 1969.
