= Jimmy Martin (golfer) =

Irish golfer (1924–2000)

James Martin
Personal information
- Nationality: Ireland
- Born: 17 July 1924 Wicklow. Ireland
- Died: 14 February 2000 (aged 75) Loughlinstown, Dublin, Ireland

Career
- Sport: Golf
- Status: Professional
- Professional wins: 7

Best results in major championships
- Masters Tournament: DNP
- PGA Championship: DNP
- U.S. Open: DNP
- The Open Championship: T16: 1962

James Martin (17 July 1924 – 14 February 2000) was an Irish professional golfer who enjoyed three victories on the British circuit in the 1960s, including the Piccadilly Medal in 1964 and the Carroll's International in 1968.

== Career ==
Martin was born in Wicklow. His father was the professional at Greystones Golf Club. He was selected to represent Ireland at five World Cups between 1962 and 1970, and also to represent Great Britain in the Ryder Cup at Royal Birkdale in 1965, where he would play in - and lose - one foursomes match, in partnership with Jimmy Hitchcock, to Julius Boros and Tony Lema.

== Personal life ==
Martin died on 14 February 2000 at St. Columcille's Hospital in Loughlinstown, Dublin, Ireland aged 75.

== Professional wins (7) ==
This list is probably incomplete

- 1954 Coombe Hill Assistants' Tournament
- 1964 Blaxnit (Ulster) Tournament, Piccadilly Medal
- 1965 Silentnight Tournament (tie with Dave Thomas)
- 1968 Carroll's International
- 1969 Irish PGA Championship
- 1970 Turnberry-B.O.A.C. Foursomes Tournament (with Roddy Carr)

== Results in major championships ==
Tournament	1951	1952	1953	1954	1955	1956	1957	1958	1959
The Open Championship	CUT					T36	CUT		

Tournament	1960	1961	1962	1963	1964	1965	1966	1967	1968	1969
The Open Championship	T28	CUT	T16	CUT	T24	CUT	CUT	T56	T35	CUT

Tournament	1970	1971	1972	1973	1974	1975	1976	1977	1978	1979
The Open Championship	T48	CUT			CUT					CUT

Note: Martin only played in The Open Championship.

Did not play

CUT = missed the half-way cut (3rd round cut in 1969 and 1974 Open Championships)
"T" indicates a tie for a place

== Team appearances ==
- World Cup (representing Ireland): 1962, 1963, 1964, 1966, 1970
- Ryder Cup (representing Great Britain): 1965
