= Harry Bradshaw (golfer) =

Irish golfer (1913–1990)

Personal information
- Full name: Harry Bradshaw
- Nationality: Ireland
- Born: 9 October 1913 Delgany, County Wicklow, Ireland
- Died: 22 December 1990 (aged 77)
- Spouse: Elizabeth Walsh
- Children: 4

Career
- Sport: Golf
- Status: Professional
- Professional wins: 21

Best results in major championships
- Masters Tournament: DNP
- PGA Championship: DNP
- U.S. Open: DNP
- The Open Championship: 2nd: 1949

Harry Bradshaw (9 October 1913 – 22 December 1990) was a leading Irish professional golfer of the 1940s and 1950s.

== Early life ==
Bradshaw was born in Delgany, County Wicklow. He was the son of the Delgany professional golfer Ned Bradshaw and he and his three brothers Jimmy, Eddie and Hughie all became professional golfers.

== Professional career ==
He represented Ireland in the Triangular Professional Tournament in 1937 and Llandudno International Golf Trophy in 1938. He won the Irish PGA Championship 10 times between 1941 and 1957, tied with Christy O'Connor Snr for most wins in that event. He was also the Irish Open champion in 1947 and 1949. He teamed with Christy O'Connor to win the Canada Cup for Ireland in Mexico in 1958, finishing second in the individual section of the event despite suffering nosebleeds due to the altitude. Bradshaw played in the Ryder Cup in 1953, 1955 and 1957. He was twice Dunlop Masters champion, in 1953 and 1955.

Bradshaw lost the 1949 The Open Championship following a playoff against Bobby Locke at Royal St George's, after an extraordinary incident in the second round when his drive at the 5th hole came to rest against broken glass from a beer bottle on the fairway. Rather than taking a drop (to which he would probably have been entitled) Bradshaw elected to play the ball as it lay, but was only able to move it slightly forward, dropping the shot. The setback resulted in his tying with Locke with an aggregate of 283, thereby equaling the championship record. However, he lost the playoff to Locke. Arguably the incident with the bottle cost Bradshaw the tournament.

== Personal life ==
Bradshaw married Elizabeth Walsh from County Carlow and together they had four children.

Bradshaw died on the 22 December 1990. He died in St Vincent’s Hospital, (Note: There are at least three institutions in the Dublin area known as St. Vincent's Hospital, and the source does not specify which is meant.) County Dublin, and was buried in St. Fintan's Cemetery in Sutton, County Dublin.

== Tournament wins (21) ==
=== European Circuit wins (5) ===
Date	Tournament	Winning score	Margin of victory	Runner-up
10 Jul 1947	Irish Open	73-74-73-70=290	2 strokes	(Belgium) Flory Van Donck
29 Jul 1949	Irish Open	70-71-72-73=286	1 stroke	(South Africa) Bobby Locke
8 Oct 1953	Dunlop Masters	69-68-69-66=272	3 strokes	(England) Max Faulkner
21 Sep 1955	Dunlop Masters	69-70-71-67=277	4 strokes	(England) Henry Cotton
11 Apr 1958	PGA Close Championship	72-71-73-71=287	1 stroke	(Wales) Dai Rees

=== Other wins (16) ===
- 1941 Irish PGA Championship
- 1942 Irish PGA Championship
- 1943 Irish PGA Championship
- 1944 Irish PGA Championship
- 1947 Irish PGA Championship
- 1950 Irish PGA Championship, Irish Dunlop Tournament
- 1951 Irish PGA Championship, Irish Dunlop Tournament
- 1952 Dunbar Open Tournament
- 1953 Irish PGA Championship
- 1954 Irish PGA Championship
- 1955 Gleneagles-Saxone Foursomes Tournament (with Joe Carr)
- 1957 Irish PGA Championship
- 1958 Irish Dunlop Tournament (tie with Norman Drew), Canada Cup (with Christy O'Connor Snr)

== Playoff record ==
PGA Tour playoff record (0–1)

No.	Year	Tournament	Opponent	Result
1	1949	The Open Championship	(South Africa) Bobby Locke	Lost 36-hole playoff; Locke: −9 (67-68=135), Bradshaw: +3 (74-73=147)

== Results in major championships ==
Tournament	1946	1947	1948	1949
The Open Championship	11	CUT	CUT	2

Tournament	1950	1951	1952	1953	1954	1955	1956	1957	1958	1959
The Open Championship	16	15	T9	CUT	T12	T22	T43	T19	T24	T16

Tournament	1960	1961	1962	1963	1964	1965
The Open Championship		T20	T30	CUT	CUT	CUT

Note: Bradshaw only played in The Open Championship.

Top 10
Did not play

CUT = missed the half-way cut
"T" indicates a tie for a place

== Team appearances ==
- Ryder Cup (representing Great Britain): 1953, 1955, 1957 (winners)
- Canada Cup (representing Ireland): 1954, 1955, 1956, 1957, 1958 (winners), 1959
- Triangular Professional Tournament (representing Ireland): 1937
- Llandudno International Golf Trophy (representing Ireland): 1938
- Joy Cup (representing the British Isles): 1954 (winners), 1955 (winners), 1956 (winners), 1958 (winners)
- Slazenger Trophy (representing Great Britain and Ireland): 1956 (winners)
- Amateurs–Professionals Match (representing the Professionals): 1956 (winners), 1957 (winners), 1958
