= Ernie Jones (golfer) =

Irish golfer (1932–2019)

Personal information
- Full name: Ernest Thomas Jones
- Nationality: Ireland
- Born: 22 September 1932 Curragh Camp, County Kildare, Ireland
- Died: 31 December 2019 (aged 87) Downpatrick, Northern Ireland

Career
- Sport: Golf
- Status: Professional
- Professional wins: 6

Best results in major championships
- Masters Tournament: DNP
- PGA Championship: DNP
- U.S. Open: DNP
- The Open Championship: T46: 1972

Ernest Thomas Jones (22 September 1932 – 31 December 2019) was an Irish professional golfer. He won the Irish PGA Championship twice and represented Ireland in the 1965 Canada Cup. His biggest individual successes came in the 1961 Cox Moore Tournament and, as a senior, in the 1984 Trusthouse Forte PGA Seniors Championship.

== Golf career ==
Jones won the Irish PGA Championship in 1955 and 1964. He also won the 1959 Hennessy Tournament. Outside Ireland, Jones was a surprise winner of the 1961 Cox Moore Tournament with an impressive score of 270, two strokes ahead of Peter Alliss, taking the first prize of £1,000. He also won the 1971 Kenya Open after a playoff against Russell Meek.

Playing with Christy Greene, Jones represented Ireland in the 1965 Canada Cup in Madrid. He also represented Ireland in the 1967 R.T.V. International Trophy at Edmondstown Golf Course, County Dublin.

Jones played in the Open Championship 8 times between 1957 and 1972 but only made the cut once, on his last appearance in 1972.

As a senior, Jones won the 1984 Trusthouse Forte PGA Seniors Championship at Stratford-on-Avon, beating Peter Butler and Ross Whitehead by 3 strokes and winning £3,000.

Jones became an assistant at the Royal Curragh Golf Club in 1948 and was later the professional at Carlow Golf Club, Foxrock Golf Club, Bangor Golf Club (from 1963), Royal County Down and the K Club (1991–2002). He was captain of the Professional Golfers' Association from 1991 to 1993 and was made an honorary member in 2001. Jones refereed the final match of the 1969 Ryder Cup, the singles match between Jack Nicklaus and Tony Jacklin which was halved after Nicklaus conceded a short putt.

== Professional wins (6) ==
- 1955 Irish PGA Championship
- 1959 Hennessy Tournament
- 1961 Cox Moore Tournament
- 1964 Irish PGA Championship
- 1971 Kenya Open
- 1984 Trusthouse Forte PGA Seniors Championship

== Results in major championships ==
Tournament	1957	1958	1959
The Open Championship	CUT		

Tournament	1960	1961	1962	1963	1964	1965	1966	1967	1968	1969
The Open Championship					CUT	CUT	CUT	CUT	CUT	CUT

Tournament	1970	1971	1972
The Open Championship			T46

Note: Jones only played in The Open Championship.

Did not play

CUT = missed the half-way cut
"T" indicates a tie for a place

== Team appearances ==
- World Cup (representing Ireland): 1965
- R.T.V. International Trophy (representing Ireland): 1967
- PGA Cup (representing Great Britain and Ireland): 1976
