= Elm Park Golf Club =

Sports club in Donnybrook, Dublin, Ireland

Coordinates: 53.314444°N 6.219115°W

Elm Park Golf and Sports Club
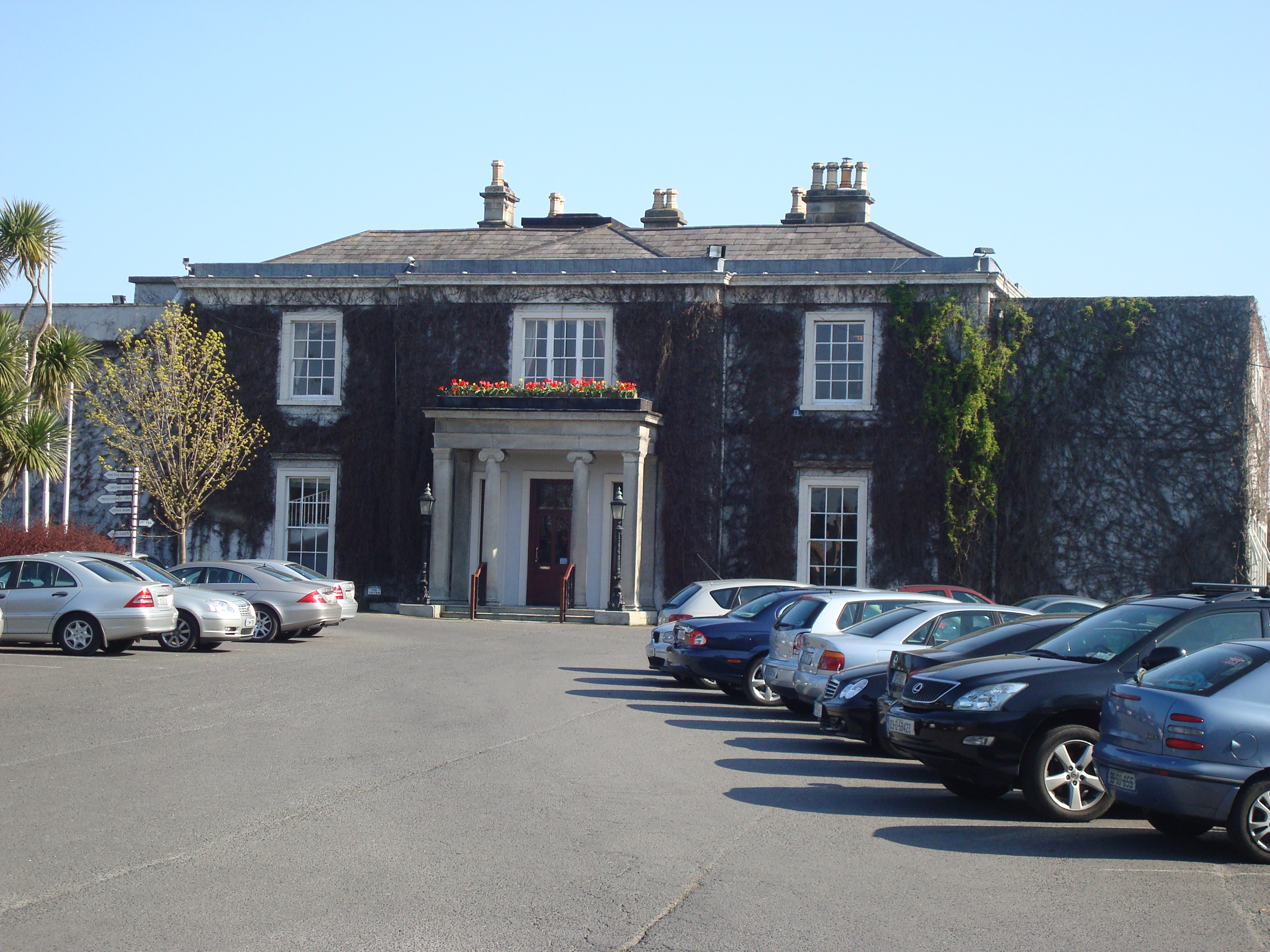
- Interactive map of Elm Park Golf and Sports Club

Club information
- Location: Nutley Lane, Donnybrook, Dublin 4, Ireland
- Established: 1924
- Type: Private
- Operator: Elm Park Golf & Sports Club Limited
- Tota holes: 18
- Website: elmpark.ie
- Designed by: redesigned by Patrick Merrigan in 2002

Elm Park Golf & Sports Club operates an 18-hole golf course and tennis club located at Nutley Lane, Donnybrook, Dublin 4, Ireland.

== History ==
The golf club was established in 1924 with the purchase of Elm Park House and its surrounding lands. It opened the following year as a 9-hole golf club with an initial membership of 254 and, in 1926, extended its facilities with the opening of tennis courts.

In 1933, the club sold property to the Religious Sisters of Charity as a site for St. Vincent's Hospital. In 1936, Nutley House and land was leased from the Religious Sisters of Charity and a 9-hole golf course and tennis courts were opened.

In 1941, a short-term lease on Elm Park land was made from the Religious Sisters of Charity, as the hospital project had been postponed. This allowed the course to be expanded to 18 holes. However, in 1956, the Elm Park land had to be returned and the club was reduced to the earlier 9-hole course.

The club expanded again in 1960 with the purchase of the nearby Bloomfield property, allowing it to extend the course to 18 holes once again. Then, in 1976, the clubhouse was extended to include a dining room, function room, locker rooms, office, and shop. The final expansion of lands took place in 1994 with the purchase of lands adjoining the 11th and 12th holes.

A redesign of the greens took place in 2002 by the Golf Course Architect Patrick Merrigan, with a design that puts a priority on drive placement and second shot value. This also included strategically locating bunkers around the course.

== Facilities ==
The club has an 18-hole golf course, a driving range, 7 grass tennis courts, 5 all-weather tennis courts, and 2 covered tennis courts.

== Nature ==
The Elm Park Stream runs through the golf course, and is used to form water features / hazards.
