= Jimmy Hitchcock (golfer) =

English professional golfer

Personal information
- Full name: James Hitchcock
- Nationality: England
- Born: 1930 Bromley, London, England
- Died: 25 December 2015 (aged 85) Belgium

Career
- Sport: Golf
- Status: Professional
- Professional wins: 2

Best results in major championships
- Masters Tournament: T61: 1966
- PGA Championship: DNP
- U.S. Open: DNP
- The Open Championship: T11: 1959

James Hitchcock (1930 – 25 December 2015) was an English professional golfer.

== Career ==
In 1930, Hitchcock was born in Bromley, England.

Hitchcock won several major professional tournaments including the 1960 British Masters and the 1965 Agfa-Gevaert Tournament. He was selected as a member of the Great Britain and Ireland Ryder Cup team in 1965, losing all three of the matches he played.

== Death ==
Hitchcock died, aged 85, on Christmas Day 2015 in Belgium where he had lived for many years.

== Tournament wins ==
- 1960 British Masters
- 1961 East Rand Open (South Africa)
- 1965 Agfa-Gevaert Tournament, Honda Foursomes Tournament (with Bill Large)

== Results in major championships ==
Tournament	1953	1954	1955	1956	1957	1958	1959
Masters Tournament							
The Open Championship	CUT	T29	CUT	CUT	23	CUT	T11

Tournament	1960	1961	1962	1963	1964	1965	1966	1967	1968	1969	1970
Masters Tournament							T61				
The Open Championship		CUT	T30	T26	CUT	49	T16	CUT	CUT	T40	CUT

Note: Hitchcock only played in the Masters Tournament and The Open Championship.

Did not play

CUT = missed the half-way cut (3rd round cut in 1968 Open Championship)
"T" indicates a tie for a place

== Team appearances ==
- Ryder Cup (representing Great Britain): 1965
- Amateurs–Professionals Match (representing the Professionals): 1959 (winners)
