= Jimmy Kinsella =

Irish professional golfer (born 1939)

Personal information
- Full name: James J. Kinsella
- Nationality: Ireland
- Born: 25 May 1939 (age 87)

Career
- Sport: Golf
- Turned professional: 1954
- Former tours: European Tour; European Seniors Tour
- Professional wins: 6

Number of wins by tour
- European Tour: 1
- Other: 5

Best results in major championships
- Masters Tournament: DNP
- PGA Championship: DNP
- U.S. Open: DNP
- The Open Championship: T40: 1971

James J. Kinsella (born 25 May 1939) is an Irish professional golfer.

== Career ==
Kinsella played on the European Tour in the 1970s, winning the 1972 Madrid Open. He played on the European Seniors Tour in its first three seasons, 1992–94.

== Professional wins (6) ==
=== European Tour wins (1) ===
No.	Date	Tournament	Winning score	Margin of victory	Runner-up
1	22 Apr 1972	Madrid Open	−5 (75-69-67-72=283)	1 stroke	(Spain) José María Cañizares

=== Other wins (5) ===
This list is incomplete

- 1960 Irish Dunlop Tournament (tie with Christy O'Connor Snr)
- 1967 Carroll's No. 1 Tournament
- 1971 Irish Dunlop Tournament
- 1972 Irish PGA Championship
- 1973 Irish PGA Championship

== Results in major championships ==
Tournament	1957	1958	1959	1960	1961	1962	1963	1964	1965	1966	1967	1968	1969	1970	1971	1972	1973
The Open Championship	CUT											CUT	CUT	CUT	T40		CUT

Note: Kinsella only played in The Open Championship.

Did not play

CUT = missed the half-way cut
"T" = tied

== Team appearances ==
- World Cup (representing Ireland): 1968, 1969, 1972, 1973
- Double Diamond International (representing Ireland): 1971, 1972, 1973, 1974
- Marlboro Nations' Cup (representing Ireland): 1972
- PGA Cup (representing Great Britain and Ireland): 1977 (tie)
