= Christy O'Connor Snr =

Irish professional golfer (1924–2016

Personal information
- Full name: Patrick Christopher O'Connor
- Nickname: Himself
- Nationality: Ireland
- Born: 21 December 1924 Knocknacarra, Galway
- Died: 14 May 2016 (aged 91) Dublin, Ireland
- Height: 5 ft 11 in (1.80 m)
- Weight: 203 lb (92 kg; 14.5 st)

Career
- Sport: Golf
- Turned professional: 1951
- Former tours: European Tour; European Seniors Tour
- Professional wins: 64

Number of wins by tour
- European Tour: 1
- Other: 63

Best results in major championships
- Masters Tournament: DNP
- PGA Championship: DNP
- U.S. Open: DNP
- The Open Championship: T2: 1965

Achievements and awards
- World Golf Hall of Fame: 2009 (member page)
- Harry Vardon Trophy: 1961, 1962

Patrick Christopher O'Connor (known as Christy O'Connor Snr; 21 December 1924 – 14 May 2016) was an Irish professional golfer. He was one of the leading golfers on the British and Irish circuit from the mid-1950s.

O'Connor won over 20 tournaments on the British PGA and finished in the top 10 in the Open Championship many times. Later he had considerable success in senior events, twice winning the World Senior Championship. In team events he played in 10 successive Ryder Cup matches and played in 15 Canada Cup/World Cup matches for Ireland, winning the Canada Cup in 1958 in partnership with Harry Bradshaw.

== Early life ==
In 1924, O'Connor was born in Knocknacarra, a village in Galway. He caught his first glimpse of golf at the nearby Galway Golf Club, and from the age of 10 spent most of his spare time there. His foray into professional golf began with caddying, first at Galway and then at Tuam Golf Club.

== Professional career ==
In 1951, O'Connor turned professional with Tuam members funding his first tournament at the Open Championship at Royal Portrush, Antrim that same year. His 19th-place finish garnered a membership invitation from Bundoran Golf Club in Donegal, which he accepted.

O'Connor's first professional win was at the Swallow-Penfold Tournament held in 1955, the first £1,000 prize to be offered in British golf. He went on to win the 1956 and 1959 British Masters. In 1958, he helped Ireland to win the Canada Cup in Mexico City playing with Harry Bradshaw. A year later, he moved to Dublin and joined The Royal Dublin Golf Club. Throughout the 1960s he won at least one professional event during each year on the British Tour, a level of consistent success matched by very few other players. O'Connor rarely played professional tournaments outside Britain or Ireland, at one stage saying he forwent playing at the US Masters in Augusta because he couldn't afford to participate.

The only major championship O'Connor played was the Open Championship. He played the event 26 times between 1951 and 1979. His best performance came at the 1965 Open Championship where O'Connor tied for second place with Brian Huggett, two behind five-time winner Peter Thomson. He easily outplayed international stars like Jack Nicklaus, Arnold Palmer, Sam Snead, and Gary Player. He received an astonishing 20 invitations to play the Masters but rejected all of them, citing prohibitive financial costs.

O'Connor played in every Ryder Cup from 1955 to 1973, setting a record of ten appearances in the event which stood until it was surpassed by Nick Faldo in 1997. He was the Irish professional champion on ten occasions, including in 1978 (when he was 53), and was twice (1961 and 1962) recipient of the Vardon Trophy for leading the British Tour's Order of Merit.

In the 1966 Carroll's International at Royal Dublin, O'Connor finished 2-3-3 (eagle-birdie-eagle) to win the tournament by 2 strokes. At the par-4 16th, he drove the green and holed a 20-foot putt. He then holed a 12-foot putt at the 17th and, at the par-5 18th, hit a 3-iron to 8 feet and holed the putt. A plaque by the 16th tee commemorates the achievement. In 1970, he won the John Player Classic, at that time its £25,000 first prize was the richest offered in golf (in those days, even the British Open champion received just a little over £5,000), it made him that season's leading money-winner, although not Order of Merit leader, which was decided by a points system not directly related to prize money.

Later in his career, O'Connor became the leading "senior" (over-50s) professional player of his day, just before the lucrative U.S.-based Senior PGA Tour, now known as the PGA Tour Champions, took off. He won the PGA Seniors Championship six times and the World Senior Championship in 1976 and 1977. O'Connor was elected to the World Golf Hall of Fame in 2009 in the Veterans category.

== Personal life ==
O'Connor met his wife, Mary Collins, in Donegal while he was a member of Bundoran Golf Club. They married in 1954 and had six children together. During his early career he was known simply as Christy O'Connor, but his nephew of the same name also became a prominent golfer, and since that time they have been referred to as Christy O'Connor Senior and Christy O'Connor Junior, respectively. He was known as "Himself" among his golfing peers. He died at the age of 91 in Dublin's Mater Hospital, on 14 May 2016.

== Honours ==
O'Connor Sr (and his nephew, O'Connor Jr) were awarded a joint honorary doctorate by NUI Galway in 2006.

== Professional wins (64) ==
=== European Tour wins (1) ===
No.	Date	Tournament	Winning score	Margin of victory	Runner-up
1	25 Jun 1972	Carroll's International	−12 (73-69-75-67=284)	4 strokes	(England) David Talbot

=== British PGA circuit wins (22) ===
Date	Tournament	Winning score	Margin of victory	Runner(s)-up
27 May 1955	Swallow-Penfold Tournament	74-71-73-74=292	2 strokes	(Scotland) Eric Brown, (England) Syd Scott
20 Apr 1956	Spalding Tournament	69-66-71-70=276	Shared title with (England) Harry Weetman	
20 Sep 1956	Dunlop Masters	71-67-72-67=277	1 stroke	(Scotland) Eric Brown
14 Sep 1957	News of the World Match Play	5&4 in final		(Scotland) Tom Haliburton
14 Jun 1959	Daks Tournament	69-64-67-74=274	3 strokes	(England) Peter Mills
20 Sep 1959	Dunlop Masters	71-70-69-66=276	4 strokes	(Republic of Ireland) Joe Carr (am), (Northern Ireland) Norman Drew
18 Jul 1960	Irish Hospitals Tournament	70-67-71-64=272; 63 to 71 in playoff	Playoff (18 holes)	(England) Ken Bousfield
20 Aug 1960	Ballantine Tournament	69-66-70-72=277	2 strokes	(Scotland) John Panton
4 Aug 1961	Carling-Caledonian Tournament	62-65-72-70=269	2 strokes	(Scotland) John Panton, (England) Harry Weetman
22 Jul 1962	Irish Hospitals Tournament	70-67-65-69=271	1 stroke	(New Zealand) Bob Charles
4 May 1963	Martini International	74-74-70-80=298	Shared title with (England) Neil Coles	
2 May 1964	Martini International	71-76-68-71=286	6 strokes	(England) Lionel Platts
24 May 1964	Jeyes Tournament	70-68-69-69=276	1 stroke	(Australia) Peter Thomson
19 Jul 1964	Carroll Sweet Afton Tournament	65-66-66-71=268	Playoff	(Argentina) Roberto De Vicenzo
31 Jul 1965	Senior Service Tournament	64-71-68=203	1 stroke	(Republic of Ireland) Hugh Boyle, (United States) Jacky Cupit
6 Aug 1966	Gallaher Ulster Open	65-67-68-68=268	Playoff	(South Africa) Cobie Legrange, (Scotland) George Will
28 Aug 1966	Carroll's International	71-68-67-66=272	2 strokes	(Scotland) Eric Brown
13 Aug 1967	Carroll's International	66-69-70-72=277	2 strokes	(England) Tommy Horton
10 Aug 1968	Gallaher Ulster Open	69-66-?-?=267	2 strokes	(England) Peter Butler
5 Oct 1968	Alcan International	71-72-71-74=288	Shared title with (England) Bill Large	
2 Aug 1969	Gallaher Ulster Open	65-69-?-?=271	3 strokes	(Northern Ireland) Norman Drew, (England) Malcolm Gregson, (England) Bernard Hunt, (Republic of Ireland) Jimmy Martin
6 Sep 1970	John Player Classic	70-71-73-72=286	1 stroke	(England) Tony Jacklin

=== Other wins (33) ===
- 1953 Ulster Professional Championship, Irish Dunlop Tournament
- 1954 Ulster Professional Championship
- 1955 Irish Dunlop Tournament
- 1957 Hennessy Tournament
- 1958 Irish PGA Championship, Canada Cup (with Harry Bradshaw)
- 1960 Irish PGA Championship, Hennessy Tournament, Irish Dunlop Tournament (shared with Jimmy Kinsella), Moran Cup
- 1961 Irish PGA Championship, Hennessy Tournament
- 1962 Irish PGA Championship, Hennessy Tournament, Irish Dunlop Tournament, Gleneagles Hotel Foursomes Tournament (with Noel Fogarty)
- 1963 Irish PGA Championship, Hennessy Tournament
- 1965 Irish PGA Championship, Irish Dunlop Tournament
- 1966 Irish PGA Championship, Irish Dunlop Tournament, Carrolls No. 1 Tournament
- 1967 Irish Dunlop Tournament
- 1968 Carrolls No. 1 Tournament
- 1969 Southern Irish Championship
- 1970 Sean Connery Pro-Am
- 1971 Irish PGA Championship, Links Pro-Am
- 1975 Irish PGA Championship
- 1976 Southern Irish Championship
- 1978 Irish PGA Championship
- 1980 Links Pro-Am (tie)

=== Senior wins (8) ===
- 1976 PGA Seniors Championship, World Senior Championship
- 1977 PGA Seniors Championship, World Senior Championship
- 1979 PGA Seniors Championship
- 1981 PGA Seniors Championship
- 1982 PGA Seniors Championship
- 1983 PGA Seniors Championship

Source: (Note: The WGHoF erroneously includes the 1970 Bowmaker Tournament, won by Neil Coles, and the 1974 Irish Dunlop Tournament, won by Christy O'Connor Jnr.)

== Playoff record ==
European Senior Tour playoff record (0–1)

No.	Year	Tournament	Opponents	Result
1	1992	Forte PGA Seniors Championship	(England) Tony Grubb, (England) Tommy Horton	Horton won with birdie on first extra hole

== Results in major championships ==
Tournament	1951	1952	1953	1954	1955	1956	1957	1958	1959
The Open Championship	T19		T24	T20	T10	T10	T19	T3	T5

Tournament	1960	1961	1962	1963	1964	1965	1966	1967	1968	1969
The Open Championship	T36	T3	T16	6	T6	T2	T13	21	CUT	5

Tournament	1970	1971	1972	1973	1974	1975	1976	1977	1978	1979
The Open Championship	T17	T35	T23	T7	T56		CUT	CUT		T36

Note: O'Connor only played in The Open Championship.

Top 10
Did not play

CUT = missed the half-way cut (3rd round cut in 1977 Open Championship)
"T" indicates a tie for a place

== Team appearances ==
- Ryder Cup (representing Great Britain & Ireland): 1955, 1957 (winners), 1959, 1961, 1963, 1965, 1967, 1969 (tie), 1971, 1973
- World Cup (representing Ireland): 1956, 1957, 1958 (winners), 1959, 1960, 1961, 1962, 1963, 1964, 1966, 1967, 1968, 1969, 1971, 1975
- Joy Cup (representing the British Isles): 1955 (winners), 1956 (winners), 1958 (winners)
- Slazenger Trophy (representing Great Britain and Ireland): 1956 (winners)
- Amateurs–Professionals Match (representing the Professionals): 1956 (winners), 1958, 1959 (winner)
- R.T.V. International Trophy (representing Ireland): 1967 (captain)
- Double Diamond International (representing Ireland): 1971 (captain), 1972 (captain), 1973 (captain), 1974 (captain), 1975 (captain), 1976 (captain), 1977 (captain)
- PGA Cup: (representing Great Britain and Ireland) 1975 (non-playing captain)

== See also ==
- List of people on the postage stamps of Ireland
