= 2016 Open Championship =

Golf tournament held in 2016

Tournament information
- Dates: 14–17 July 2016
- Location: Troon, South Ayrshire, Scotland; 55.532°N 4.651°W
- Courses: Royal Troon Golf Club; Old Course
- Organized by: The R&A
- Tours: European Tour; PGA Tour; Japan Golf Tour

Statistics
- Par: 71
- Length: 7,190 yd (6,575 m)
- Field: 156 players, 81 after cut
- Cut: 146 (+4)
- Prize fund: £6,500,000 €7,544,614 $8,572,200
- Winner's share: £1,175,000 €1,363,834 $1,549,590

Champion
- (Sweden) Henrik Stenson
- 264 (−20)
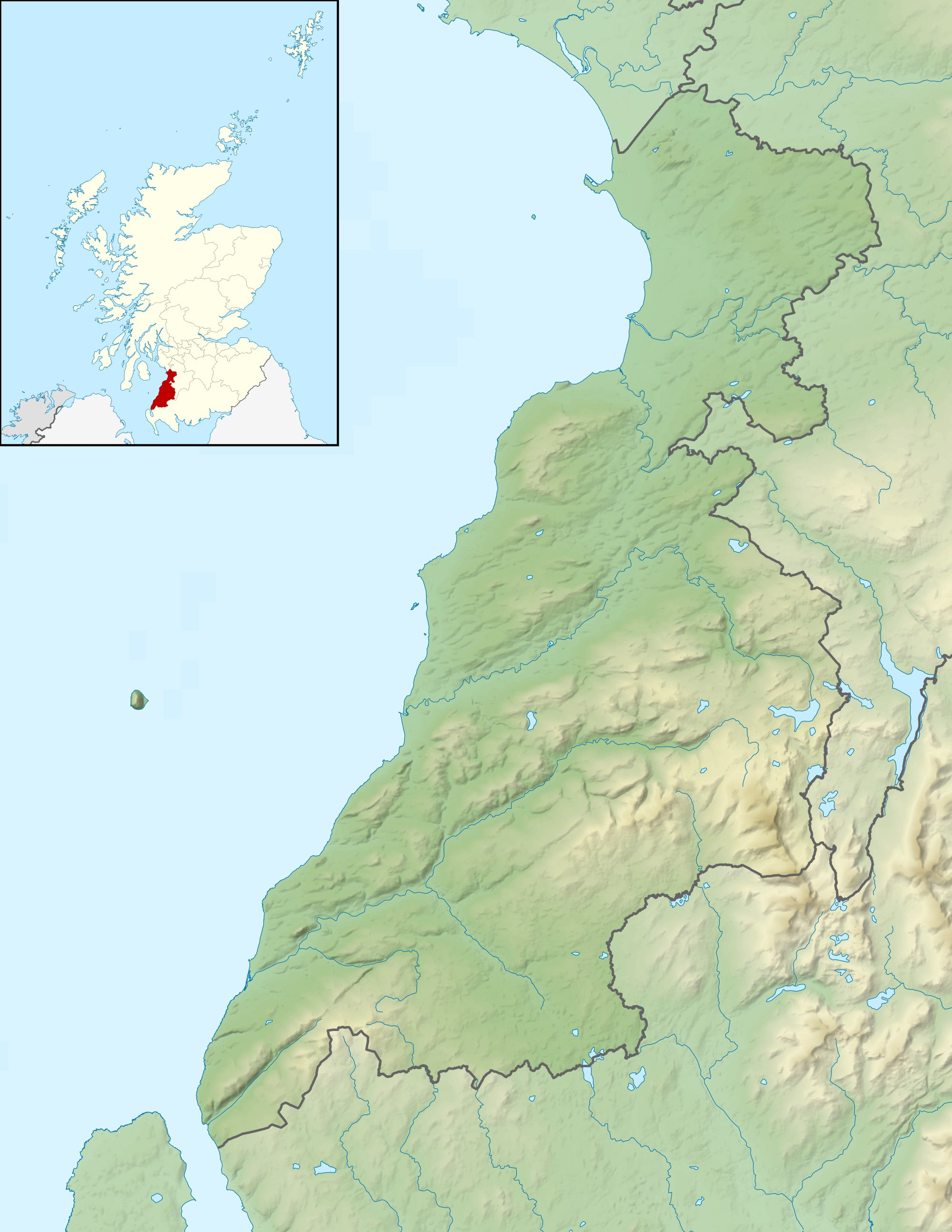
- Location in the United Kingdom Location in Scotland Location in South Ayrshire, Scotland

The 2016 Open Championship was a men's major golf championship and the 145th Open Championship, played from 14–17 July at Royal Troon Golf Club in Troon, South Ayrshire, Scotland. It was the ninth Open Championship played at the Old Course of Troon, and the fifth since gaining royal status.

Henrik Stenson shot a final round 63 for 264, a record 20-under par, three strokes ahead of runner-up Phil Mickelson, the 2013 champion. The leader after 54 holes, Stenson became the first Scandinavian man to win a major title. The duo's final-day battle, ending fourteen and eleven shots clear of third-place J. B. Holmes, was dubbed "High Noon at Troon" and compared in quality to the renowned "Duel in the Sun" of 1977.

== Media ==
This was the first Open Championship under new television rights deals in the United Kingdom and United States. In the U.K., Sky Sports replaced the BBC, who held broadcast rights from 1955 to 2015, marking the first time that rights to the Open had been held by a subscription television service. To comply with anti-siphoning laws, rights to broadcast a nightly highlights programme on free-to-air television were sold to the BBC. The contract was to begin in 2017, but the BBC opted out of the 2016 edition.

In the U.S., television rights shifted from ESPN to NBC and sister pay-TV network Golf Channel, marking the first time that Golf Channel had coverage of a men's major championship. It also restored a major to the network for the first time since 2014; from 1995 to 2014, NBC televised the U.S. Open and other championships of the USGA, which moved to Fox Sports in 2015. Similarly to the BBC, ESPN chose to opt out of its final year of Open rights, causing NBC's rights to begin in 2016 instead.

== Venue ==
Old Course

Hole	Name	Yards	Par	Hole	Name	Yards	Par
1	Seal	367	4	10	Sandhills	451	4
2	Black Rock	390	4	11	The Railway	482	4
3	Gyaws	377	4	12	The Fox	430	4
4	Dunure	555	5	13	Burmah	473	4
5	Greenan	209	3	14	Alton	178	3
6	Turnberry	601	5	15	Crosbie	499	4
7	Tel-el-Kebir	401	4	16	Well	554	5
8	Postage Stamp	123	3	17	Rabbit	220	3
9	The Monk	422	4	18	Craigend	458	4
Out		3,445	36	In		3,745	35
Source:				Total		7,190	71

Lengths of the course for previous Opens:

- 2004: 7,175 yards (6,561 m), par 71
- 1997: 7,079 yards (6,473 m), par 71
- 1989: 7,097 yards (6,489 m), par 72
- 1982: 7,067 yards (6,462 m), par 72
- 1973: 7,064 yards (6,459 m), par 72
- 1962: 7,045 yards (6,442 m), par 72
- 1950: 6,583 yards (6,019 m), par 70
- 1923: 6,415 yards (5,866 m)

Opens from 1962 through 1989 played the 11th hole as a par-5.

== Field ==
=== Criteria and exemptions ===
Each player is classified according to the first category in which he qualified, but other categories are shown in parentheses.

1. The Open Champions aged 60 or under on 17 July 2016

- Mark Calcavecchia
- Darren Clarke (2)
- Ben Curtis
- John Daly
- David Duval
- Ernie Els (2)
- Todd Hamilton
- Pádraig Harrington (2)
- Zach Johnson (2,3,4,12,14)
- Paul Lawrie
- Justin Leonard
- Sandy Lyle
- Rory McIlroy (2,4,5,6,10,12)
- Phil Mickelson (2,4,14)
- Mark O'Meara
- Louis Oosthuizen (2,3,4,5,12,14)
- Stewart Cink (2) and Tiger Woods (2) did not play.
- Eligible but did not enter: Nick Faldo, Ian Baker-Finch, Tom Lehman, Nick Price.

2. The Open Champions for 2006–2015

3. First 10 and anyone tying for 10th place in the 2015 Open Championship

- Jason Day (4,10,11,12,14)
- Sergio García (4)
- Marc Leishman (4,14)
- Jordan Niebrugge
- Justin Rose (4,5,8,12)
- Adam Scott (4,9,14)
- Jordan Spieth (4,8,9,12,14)
- Danny Willett (4,5,9)
- Brooks Koepka (4,12) withdrew with an ankle injury.

4. The first 50 players on the Official World Golf Ranking (OWGR) for Week 21, 2016

- An Byeong-hun (5,6)
- Kiradech Aphibarnrat (5)
- Rafa Cabrera-Bello
- Paul Casey (12)
- Kevin Chappell
- Matt Fitzpatrick (5)
- Rickie Fowler (11,12,14)
- Jim Furyk (12)
- Branden Grace (5,14)
- Emiliano Grillo
- Bill Haas (12,14)
- Charley Hoffman (12)
- J. B. Holmes (12,14)
- Billy Horschel
- Thongchai Jaidee (5,14)
- Dustin Johnson (8,12,14)
- Kim Kyung-tae (19)
- Kevin Kisner (12)
- Søren Kjeldsen (5)
- Russell Knox
- Matt Kuchar (12,14)
- Danny Lee (12,14)
- David Lingmerth
- Shane Lowry (5)
- Hideki Matsuyama (12,14)
- Ryan Moore
- Kevin Na (12)
- Patrick Reed (5,12,14)
- Charl Schwartzel (5,14)
- Brandt Snedeker (12)
- Henrik Stenson (5,12)
- Andy Sullivan (5)
- Justin Thomas
- Jimmy Walker (12,14)
- Bubba Watson (9,12,14)
- Lee Westwood (OQS-Thailand)
- Bernd Wiesberger (5)
- Daniel Berger (12) withdrew with a shoulder injury.

5. First 30 in the Race to Dubai for 2015

- Kristoffer Broberg
- Victor Dubuisson
- Ross Fisher
- Tommy Fleetwood
- David Howell
- Miguel Ángel Jiménez
- Martin Kaymer (8,11)
- Anirban Lahiri (14,15)
- James Morrison
- Thorbjørn Olesen
- Thomas Pieters
- Marc Warren
- Chris Wood (6)
- Jaco van Zyl withdrew to focus on the Olympics.

6. The BMW PGA Championship winners for 2014–2016

7. First 5 European Tour members and any European Tour members tying for 5th place, not otherwise exempt, in the top 20 of the Race to Dubai on completion of the 2016 BMW International Open

- Andrew Johnston
- Rikard Karlberg
- Lee Soo-min
- Joost Luiten

8. The U.S. Open Champions for 2012–2016

- Webb Simpson

9. The Masters Tournament Champions for 2012–2016

10. The PGA Champions for 2011–2015

- Keegan Bradley
- Jason Dufner

11. The Players Champions for 2014–2016

12. Top 30 players from the final 2015 FedEx Cup points list

- Steven Bowditch (14)
- Harris English
- Scott Piercy
- Robert Streb
- Bae Sang-moon (14) was unable to compete due to a military obligation in South Korea.

13. First 5 PGA Tour members and any PGA Tour members tying for 5th place, not exempt in the top 20 of the PGA Tour FedEx Cup points list for 2016 on completion of the 2016 Quicken Loans National

- Smylie Kaufman
- William McGirt

14. Playing members of the 2015 Presidents Cup teams

- Chris Kirk

15. First and anyone tying for 1st place on the Order of Merit of the Asian Tour for 2015

16. First and anyone tying for 1st place on the Order of Merit of the PGA Tour of Australasia for 2015

- Nathan Holman

17. First and anyone tying for 1st place on the Order of Merit of the Southern Africa PGA Sunshine Tour for 2015

- George Coetzee

18. The Japan Open Champion for 2015

- Satoshi Kodaira

19. First 2 and anyone tying for 2nd place, not exempt, on the Official Money List of the Japan Golf Tour for 2015

- Yūsaku Miyazato

20. First 2 and anyone tying for 2nd place, in a cumulative money list taken from all official 2016 Japan Golf Tour events up to and including the 2016 Japan Golf Tour Championship

- Yuta Ikeda
- Yosuke Tsukada

21. The Senior Open Champion for 2015

- Marco Dawson

22. The Amateur Champion for 2016

- Scott Gregory (a)

23. The U.S. Amateur Champion for 2015

- Bryson DeChambeau forfeited his exemption by turning professional in April 2016.

24. The European Amateur Champion for 2015

- Stefano Mazzoli (a)

25. The Mark H. McCormack Medal winner for 2015

- Jon Rahm forfeited his exemption by turning professional in June 2016 but subsequently earned a spot through the Open Qualifying Series.

=== Open Qualifying Series ===
The Open Qualifying Series (OQS) consisted of 10 events from the six major tours. Places were available to the leading players (not otherwise exempt) who finish in the top n and ties. In the event of ties, positions went to players ranked highest according to that week's OWGR.

Location	Tournament	Date	Spots	Top	Qualifiers
Australia	Emirates Australian Open	29 Nov	3	10	Nick Cullen, Matt Jones, Rod Pampling
Thailand	Thailand Golf Championship	13 Dec	4	12	Jamie Donaldson, Phachara Khongwatmai, Clément Sordet, Lee Westwood (4)
Africa	Joburg Open	17 Jan	3	10	Zander Lombard, Haydn Porteous, Anthony Wall
Japan	Mizuno Open	29 May	4	12	Kodai Ichihara, Shugo Imahira, Lee Sang-hee, Hideto Tanihara
Sweden	Nordea Masters	5 Jun	1	5	Lasse Jensen
USA	FedEx St. Jude Classic	12 Jun	4	12	Brian Gay, Russell Henley, Noh Seung-yul, Steve Stricker
USA	Quicken Loans National	26 Jun	4	12	Jon Rahm, Vijay Singh, Harold Varner III: Billy Hurley III did not play so he could attend his sister's wedding.
France	Alstom Open de France	3 Jul	4	12	Alex Norén, Callum Shinkwin, Richard Sterne, Brandon Stone
USA	Barracuda Championship	3 Jul	1	5	Greg Chalmers
Scotland	Scottish Open	10 Jul	4	12	Nicolas Colsaerts, Tyrrell Hatton, Matteo Manassero, Richie Ramsay

The Greenbrier Classic was cancelled due to the damage sustained by the course in the 2016 West Virginia flood. The Open Qualifying Series event originally slated for the Greenbrier was shifted to the Barracuda Championship.

=== Final Qualifying ===
The Final Qualifying events were played on 28 June at four courses covering Scotland and the North-West, Central and South-coast regions of England. Three qualifying places were available at each location. None of the twelve qualifiers had played in Regional Qualifying on 20 June: each was exempted by virtue of holding an Official World Golf Ranking.

Location	Qualifiers (Note: (a) – indicates the player was an amateur.) (Note: (R) – indicates a golfer who came through Regional Qualifying.)
Gailes Links	Oskar Arvidsson, Scott Fernández, Colin Montgomerie
Hillside	Dave Coupland, Paul Howard, Jack Senior
Royal Cinque Ports	Steven Alker, James Heath, Matthew Southgate
Woburn	Paul Dunne, Ryan Evans, Robert Rock

=== Alternates ===
To make up the full field of 156, additional places were allocated in ranking order from the Official World Golf Ranking at the time that these places were made available by the Championship Committee.

From the Week 26 Official World Golf Ranking:

- James Hahn (ranked 58)
- Gary Woodland (65)
- Ryan Palmer (68)
- Patton Kizzire (70)
- Fabián Gómez (71)
- Wang Jeung-hun (74)
- Scott Hend (75)
- Graeme McDowell (76)
- Brendan Steele (77)
- Francesco Molinari (78)
- Tony Finau (79)
- Jim Herman (80) (Note: Herman replaced Billy Hurley III.)
- Marcus Fraser (81) (Note: Fraser replaced Tiger Woods.)

From the Week 27 Official World Golf Ranking:

- Luke Donald (ranked 83) (Note: Donald replaced Jaco van Zyl.)
- Daniel Summerhays (86) (Note: Summerhays replaced Stewart Cink.)
- Jamie Lovemark (88) (Note: Lovemark replaced Daniel Berger.)
- Colt Knost (92) (Note: Knost replaced Brooks Koepka.)
- Charles Howell III (87) and Ian Poulter (90) did not play due to injury.

== Round summaries ==
=== First round ===
Thursday, 14 July 2016

Phil Mickelson shot an 8-under-par 63 to take a three-shot lead over Martin Kaymer and Patrick Reed. His 63 tied him with 27 others for the lowest round in a major championship. Mickelson had a 16-foot putt at the 18th to become the first player to score 62 at a major championship, but the putt lipped out of the hole.

Place	Player	Score	To par
1	(United States) Phil Mickelson	63	−8
T2	(Germany) Martin Kaymer	66	−5
T2	(United States) Patrick Reed	66	−5
T4	(United States) Keegan Bradley	67	−4
T4	(United States) Tony Finau	67	−4
T4	(United States) Billy Horschel	67	−4
T4	(United States) Zach Johnson	67	−4
T4	(Denmark) Søren Kjeldsen	67	−4
T4	(United States) Steve Stricker	67	−4
T4	(England) Andy Sullivan	67	−4
T4	(United States) Justin Thomas	67	−4

=== Second round ===
Friday, 15 July 2016

Phil Mickelson maintained his lead at the halfway point at 132 (−10), a stroke ahead of Henrik Stenson, whose 65 moved him into solo second place. The cut was at 146 (+4), allowing previous major champions Jordan Spieth, Danny Willett, and Bubba Watson to continue onto the third day. Billy Horschel started in joint fourth place, but had a dismal 85 to miss the cut by six strokes.

Place	Player	Score	To par
1	(United States) Phil Mickelson	63-69=132	−10
2	(Sweden) Henrik Stenson	68-65=133	−9
T3	(United States) Keegan Bradley	67-68=135	−7
T3	(Denmark) Søren Kjeldsen	67-68=135	−7
5	(United States) Zach Johnson	67-70=137	−5
T6	(United States) Tony Finau	67-71=138	−4
T6	(Spain) Sergio García	68-70=138	−4
T6	(United States) Bill Haas	68-70=138	−4
T6	(England) Andrew Johnston	69-69=138	−4
T6	(South Africa) Charl Schwartzel	72-66=138	−4

Amateurs: Gregory (+9), Mazzoli (+12)

=== Third round ===
Saturday, 16 July 2016

Henrik Stenson (68) overtook Phil Mickelson (70) in the third round, taking a single-shot lead into the final round, with Mickelson five shots clear of the field.

Place	Player	Score	To par
1	(Sweden) Henrik Stenson	68-65-68=201	−12
2	(United States) Phil Mickelson	63-69-70=202	−11
3	(United States) Bill Haas	68-70-69=207	−6
4	(England) Andrew Johnston	69-69-70=208	−5
5	(United States) J. B. Holmes	70-70-69=209	−4
T6	(United States) Tony Finau	67-71-72=210	−3
T6	(Denmark) Søren Kjeldsen	67-68-75=210	−3
T6	(United States) Steve Stricker	67-75-68=210	−3
T9	(United States) Keegan Bradley	67-68-76=211	−2
T9	(Spain) Sergio García	68-70-73=211	−2
T9	(United States) Patrick Reed	66-74-71=211	−2
T9	(South Africa) Charl Schwartzel	72-66-73=211	−2

=== Final round ===
Sunday, 17 July 2016

In what earned instant acclaim as one of the greatest final-round duels in major championship history, Henrik Stenson broke the aggregate scoring record for all majors while establishing a new Open Championship record on his way to his first career major win. In the final pairing with Phil Mickelson, Stenson began the round with a one-shot advantage. Mickelson quickly jumped into the lead with a birdie at the first while Stenson three-putted for bogey. Stenson rebounded with five birdies on the front nine while Mickelson recorded a birdie and an eagle at the par-5 fourth, giving Stenson back a one-shot lead at the turn.

Both birdied the tenth, then Stenson made bogey at the eleventh and they were tied again. Both parred the next two holes, then Stenson recorded three consecutive birdies, including a 51-foot (16 m) putt from off the green on the 15th to open up a two-shot lead. Mickelson narrowly missed an eagle putt on the 16th while Stenson got up and down from the greenside rough for a birdie to maintain the advantage. With another birdie at the 18th, Stenson tied the major championship scoring record at 63 (−8). Runner-up Mickelson shot 267 to equal the previous Open record set by Greg Norman in 1993. Eleven strokes behind Mickelson in solo third was J. B. Holmes at 278 (−6).

==== Final leaderboard ====
Champion
(a) = amateur
(c) = past champion

Place	Player	Score	To par	Money (£)
1	(Sweden) Henrik Stenson	68-65-68-63=264	−20	1,175,000
2	(United States) Phil Mickelson (c)	63-69-70-65=267	−17	675,000
3	(United States) J. B. Holmes	70-70-69-69=278	−6	433,000
4	(United States) Steve Stricker	67-75-68-69=279	−5	337,000
T5	(Spain) Sergio García	68-70-73-69=280	−4	235,667
T5	(England) Tyrrell Hatton	70-71-71-68=280	−4	235,667
T5	(Northern Ireland) Rory McIlroy (c)	69-71-73-67=280	−4	235,667
8	(England) Andrew Johnston	69-69-70-73=281	−3	170,000
T9	(United States) Bill Haas	68-70-69-75=282	−2	135,333
T9	(United States) Dustin Johnson	71-69-72-70=282	−2	135,333
T9	(Denmark) Søren Kjeldsen	67-68-75-72=282	−2	135,333

Leaderboard below the top 10
Place	Player	Score	To par	Money (£)
T12	(Argentina) Emiliano Grillo	69-72-72-70=283	−1	92,625
T12	(United States) Zach Johnson (c)	67-70-75-71=283	−1	92,625
T12	(United States) Patrick Reed	66-74-71-72=283	−1	92,625
T12	(England) Matthew Southgate	71-71-72-69=283	−1	92,625
T12	(England) Andy Sullivan	67-76-71-69=283	−1	92,625
T12	(United States) Gary Woodland	69-73-71-70=283	−1	92,625
T18	(United States) Keegan Bradley	67-68-76-73=284	E	69,375
T18	(United States) Tony Finau	67-71-72-74=284	E	69,375
T18	(Spain) Miguel Ángel Jiménez	71-72-70-71=284	E	69,375
T18	(South Africa) Charl Schwartzel	72-66-73-73=284	E	69,375
T22	(Australia) Jason Day	73-70-71-71=285	+1	52,406
T22	(United States) Jason Dufner	71-71-74-69=285	+1	52,406
T22	(England) David Howell	74-70-71-70=285	+1	52,406
T22	(Thailand) Thongchai Jaidee	71-74-69-71=285	+1	52,406
T22	(United States) Kevin Na	70-69-73-73=285	+1	52,406
T22	(England) Justin Rose	68-77-70-70=285	+1	52,406
T22	(United States) Brandt Snedeker	73-73-68-71=285	+1	52,406
T22	(England) Lee Westwood	71-73-73-68=285	+1	52,406
T30	(Northern Ireland) Darren Clarke (c)	71-72-73-70=286	+2	39,042
T30	(Scotland) Russell Knox	72-70-75-69=286	+2	39,042
T30	(United States) Ryan Palmer	72-73-71-70=286	+2	39,042
T30	(Belgium) Thomas Pieters	68-76-70-72=286	+2	39,042
T30	(South Africa) Haydn Porteous	70-76-68-72=286	+2	39,042
T30	(United States) Jordan Spieth	71-75-72-68=286	+2	39,042
T36	(Republic of Ireland) Pádraig Harrington (c)	70-72-73-72=287	+3	32,500
T36	(Germany) Martin Kaymer	66-73-74-74=287	+3	32,500
T36	(Italy) Francesco Molinari	69-71-73-74=287	+3	32,500
T39	(Spain) Rafa Cabrera-Bello	68-71-75-74=288	+4	28,125
T39	(Australia) Matt Jones	69-73-75-71=288	+4	28,125
T39	(United States) Webb Simpson	70-72-71-75=288	+4	28,125
T39	(United States) Bubba Watson	70-76-72-70=288	+4	28,125
T43	(England) Luke Donald	73-72-72-72=289	+5	23,750
T43	(United States) Jim Herman	70-70-72-77=289	+5	23,750
T43	(Australia) Adam Scott	69-73-76-71=289	+5	23,750
T46	(Belgium) Nicolas Colsaerts	72-73-70-75=290	+6	19,129
T46	(United States) Harris English	73-73-73-71=290	+6	19,129
T46	(United States) Rickie Fowler	69-72-76-73=290	+6	19,129
T46	(United States) Matt Kuchar	71-68-75-76=290	+6	19,129
T46	(United States) Ryan Moore	70-73-74-73=290	+6	19,129
T46	(Sweden) Alex Norén	70-72-73-75=290	+6	19,129
T46	(South Africa) Richard Sterne	68-74-76-72=290	+6	19,129
T53	(United States) Kevin Chappell	71-75-73-72=291	+7	16,760
T53	(South Korea) Kim Kyung-tae	70-71-77-73=291	+7	16,760
T53	(Australia) Marc Leishman	74-69-75-73=291	+7	16,760
T53	(United States) Justin Thomas	67-77-74-73=291	+7	16,760
T53	(England) Danny Willett	71-75-74-71=291	+7	16,760
58	(England) Ryan Evans	71-75-74-72=292	+8	16,200
T59	(South Korea) An Byeong-hun	70-70-76-77=293	+9	15,950
T59	(United States) Jim Furyk	74-72-72-75=293	+9	15,950
T59	(Spain) Jon Rahm	74-71-73-75=293	+9	15,950
T59	(United States) Daniel Summerhays	71-73-77-72=293	+9	15,950
T63	(Scotland) Paul Lawrie (c)	72-74-74-74=294	+10	15,600
T63	(Northern Ireland) Graeme McDowell	75-71-72-76=294	+10	15,600
T63	(United States) Mark O'Meara (c)	71-72-78-73=294	+10	15,600
T66	(South Africa) Zander Lombard	69-76-74-76=295	+11	15,350
T66	(United States) Harold Varner III	71-72-75-77=295	+11	15,350
T68	(United States) Marco Dawson	72-73-77-74=296	+12	15,050
T68	(United States) James Hahn	74-72-74-76=296	+12	15,050
T68	(United States) Patton Kizzire	76-70-75-75=296	+12	15,050
T68	(India) Anirban Lahiri	69-72-76-79=296	+12	15,050
T72	(Wales) Jamie Donaldson	69-73-76-79=297	+13	14,650
T72	(South Africa) Branden Grace	70-74-76-77=297	+13	14,650
T72	(Australia) Scott Hend	71-73-77-76=297	+13	14,650
T72	(Japan) Yuta Ikeda	68-74-78-77=297	+13	14,650
76	(United States) Kevin Kisner	70-72-80-76=298	+14	14,400
77	(United States) Charley Hoffman	71-73-78-77=299	+15	14,300
78	(Scotland) Colin Montgomerie	71-75-79-76=301	+17	14,200
T79	(Japan) Kodai Ichihara	69-77-78-78=302	+18	14,050
T79	(South Korea) Lee Soo-min	68-77-75-82=302	+18	14,050
81	(Australia) Greg Chalmers	72-71-77-85=305	+21	13,900
CUT	(South Africa) George Coetzee	75-72=147	+5	
CUT	(South Africa) Ernie Els (c)	71-76=147	+5	
CUT	(Australia) Marcus Fraser	72-75=147	+5	
CUT	(United States) William McGirt	75-72=147	+5	
CUT	(Australia) Rod Pampling	72-75=147	+5	
CUT	(Scotland) Richie Ramsay	73-74=147	+5	
CUT	(United States) Robert Streb	74-73=147	+5	
CUT	(New Zealand) Steven Alker	73-75=148	+6	
CUT	(United States) Mark Calcavecchia (c)	73-75=148	+6	
CUT	(United States) Todd Hamilton (c)	75-73=148	+6	
CUT	(Australia) Nathan Holman	72-76=148	+6	
CUT	(Japan) Shugo Imahira	68-80=148	+6	
CUT	(United States) Smylie Kaufman	72-76=148	+6	
CUT	(United States) Chris Kirk	72-76=148	+6	
CUT	(United States) Justin Leonard (c)	70-78=148	+6	
CUT	(Sweden) David Lingmerth	73-75=148	+6	
CUT	(Italy) Matteo Manassero	70-78=148	+6	
CUT	(United States) Jordan Niebrugge	72-76=148	+6	
CUT	(Fiji) Vijay Singh	69-79=148	+6	
CUT	(Thailand) Kiradech Aphibarnrat	75-74=149	+7	
CUT	(England) Ross Fisher	71-78=149	+7	
CUT	(England) Tommy Fleetwood	73-76=149	+7	
CUT	(United States) Colt Knost	74-75=149	+7	
CUT	(South Korea) Lee Sang-hee	73-76=149	+7	
CUT	(Republic of Ireland) Shane Lowry	78-71=149	+7	
CUT	(Netherlands) Joost Luiten	75-74=149	+7	
CUT	(England) Callum Shinkwin	73-76=149	+7	
CUT	(United States) Brendan Steele	73-76=149	+7	
CUT	(England) Anthony Wall	76-73=149	+7	
CUT	(England) Dave Coupland	72-78=150	+8	
CUT	(Australia) Nick Cullen	74-76=150	+8	
CUT	(France) Victor Dubuisson	71-79=150	+8	
CUT	(United States) Brian Gay	76-74=150	+8	
CUT	(Argentina) Fabián Gómez	76-74=150	+8	
CUT	(United States) Russell Henley	73-77=150	+8	
CUT	(Japan) Hideki Matsuyama	72-78=150	+8	
CUT	(Japan) Yūsaku Miyazato	77-73=150	+8	
CUT	(England) Robert Rock	71-79=150	+8	
CUT	(France) Clément Sordet	75-75=150	+8	
CUT	(South Korea) Wang Jeung-hun	75-75=150	+8	
CUT	(Sweden) Kristoffer Broberg	77-74=151	+9	
CUT	(England) Paul Casey	77-74=151	+9	
CUT	(United States) John Daly (c)	75-76=151	+9	
CUT	(England) Scott Gregory (a)	78-73=151	+9	
CUT	(Denmark) Thorbjørn Olesen	72-79=151	+9	
CUT	(South Africa) Brandon Stone	73-78=151	+9	
CUT	(Japan) Hideto Tanihara	72-79=151	+9	
CUT	(Austria) Bernd Wiesberger	74-77=151	+9	
CUT	(Spain) Scott Fernández	72-80=152	+10	
CUT	(England) James Heath	75-77=152	+10	
CUT	(United States) Billy Horschel	67-85=152	+10	
CUT	(Sweden) Rikard Karlberg	74-78=152	+10	
CUT	(Thailand) Phachara Khongwatmai	71-81=152	+10	
CUT	(England) Jack Senior	79-73=152	+10	
CUT	(Japan) Yosuke Tsukada	74-78=152	+10	
CUT	(United States) Jimmy Walker	72-80=152	+10	
CUT	(England) Matt Fitzpatrick	73-80=153	+11	
CUT	(Denmark) Lasse Jensen	78-75=153	+11	
CUT	(Japan) Satoshi Kodaira	76-77=153	+11	
CUT	(South Korea) Noh Seung-yul	75-78=153	+11	
CUT	(Scotland) Marc Warren	77-76=153	+11	
CUT	(England) Paul Howard	73-81=154	+12	
CUT	(Italy) Stefano Mazzoli (a)	76-78=154	+12	
CUT	(England) James Morrison	76-78=154	+12	
CUT	(South Africa) Louis Oosthuizen (c)	71-83=154	+12	
CUT	(Republic of Ireland) Paul Dunne	77-78=155	+13	
CUT	(New Zealand) Danny Lee	78-77=155	+13	
CUT	(United States) Jamie Lovemark	74-81=155	+13	
CUT	(Australia) Steven Bowditch	79-78=157	+15	
CUT	(United States) Scott Piercy	77-81=158	+16	
CUT	(Sweden) Oskar Arvidsson	75-84=159	+17	
CUT	(United States) Ben Curtis (c)	77-83=160	+18	
CUT	(Scotland) Sandy Lyle (c)	85-78=163	+21	
WD	(United States) David Duval (c)	82	+11	
WD	(England) Chris Wood			

==== Scorecard ====
Hole	1	2	3	4	5	6	7	8	9	10	11	12	13	14	15	16	17	18
Par	4	4	4	5	3	5	4	3	4	4	4	4	4	3	4	5	3	4
(Sweden) Stenson	−11	−12	−13	−14	−14	−15	−15	−16	−16	−17	−16	−16	−16	−17	−18	−19	−19	−20
(United States) Mickelson	−12	−12	−12	−14	−14	−15	−15	−15	−15	−16	−16	−16	−16	−16	−16	−17	−17	−17
(United States) Holmes	−4	−4	−4	−5	−5	−6	−7	−7	−7	−7	−7	−7	−7	−7	−5	−6	−6	−6
(United States) Stricker	−3	−3	−3	−4	−4	−4	−5	−5	−5	−5	−5	−5	−5	−6	−6	−7	−5	−5
(Spain) García	−2	−2	−2	−3	−3	−3	−4	−5	−5	−4	−4	−4	−3	−3	−3	−4	−4	−4
(England) Hatton	−2	−2	−2	−2	−2	−2	−3	−3	−3	−3	−2	−3	−3	−3	−3	−4	−4	−4
(Northern Ireland) McIlroy	E	−1	−1	−1	−2	−3	−3	−3	−4	−4	−3	−2	−3	−3	−3	−4	−4	−4
(England) Johnston	−6	−5	−6	−7	−7	−7	−7	−6	−6	−5	−5	−4	−4	−4	−3	−3	−3	−3
(United States) Haas	−6	−6	−6	−6	−5	−4	−4	−3	−3	−3	−2	−2	−2	−2	−2	−2	−2	−2
(United States) D. Johnson	−1	−1	−2	−1	−1	−1	−1	−1	−1	−1	−1	−1	−2	−2	−2	−2	−2	−2
(Denmark) Kjeldsen	−3	−2	−2	−2	−1	−1	−1	−2	−2	−2	−2	−2	−2	−2	−2	−2	−2	−2

Cumulative tournament scores, relative to par

Eagle	Birdie	Bogey	Double bogey

== Records ==
- Stenson became the second to finish 20-under-par in a major championship, tying Jason Day's record from the PGA Championship in 2015.
- Stenson was the first to finish 20-under at the Open Championship, beating Tiger Woods' record of 19-under in 2000.
- Stenson's 264 set a new major championship record, beating David Toms' 265 in the PGA Championship in 2001.
- Stenson broke the previous Open Championship record by three shots, formerly 267, set by Greg Norman in 1993.
- Stenson's 63 (in round 4) and Mickelson's (in round 1) tied the major record for a round. It was the 28th and 29th time this score had been achieved, and Stenson was the 27th different player to do so. Stenson and Johnny Miller are the only players to shoot 63 in the final round of a major and win.
- Mickelson, age 46, became the oldest player to shoot a round of 63 in an Open Championship and also the second-oldest player to shoot 63 in any major championship; Gary Player shot 63 in the second round of the PGA Championship in 1984 at age 48.
- The 11-shot difference between 2nd and 3rd place was the largest in history.
