= 2015 Walker Cup =

Golf tournament

Coordinates: 53.7495°N 3.018°W

45th Walker Cup Match
- Dates: 12–13 September 2015
- Venue: Royal Lytham & St Annes
- Location: Lytham St Annes, Lancashire, England
- Captains: Nigel Edwards (GB&I); Spider Miller (USA)
(United Kingdom) (Republic of Ireland)	16½	9½	(United States)
- Great Britain & Ireland wins the Walker Cup

The 45th Walker Cup Match was played on 12 and 13 September 2015 at Royal Lytham & St Annes Golf Club in Lytham St Annes, Lancashire, England. Great Britain and Ireland won 16½ to 9½.

== Format ==
On Saturday, there are four matches of foursomes in the morning and eight singles matches in the afternoon. On Sunday, there are again four matches of foursomes in the morning, followed by ten singles matches in the afternoon. In all, 26 matches are played.

Each of the 26 matches is worth one point in the larger team competition. If a match is all square after the 18th hole extra holes are not played. Rather, each side earns ½ a point toward their team total. The team that accumulates at least 13½ points wins the competition. In the event of a tie, the current holder retains the Cup.

== Teams ==
Ten players for the US and Great Britain & Ireland participated in the event plus one non-playing captain for each team.

Team USA
Name	Rank	Age	Hometown	Notes
Spider Miller		65	Bloomington, Indiana	non-playing captain
Bryson DeChambeau	5	21	Clovis, California	won 2015 NCAA Individual Championship, U.S. Amateur
Scott Harvey	109	37	Greensboro, North Carolina	won 2014 U.S. Mid-Amateur
Beau Hossler	14	20	Mission Viejo, California	won 2014 Western Amateur
Denny McCarthy	10	22	Rockville, Maryland	won 2015 Porter Cup
Lee McCoy	6	21	Athens, Georgia	played on 2015 Palmer Cup team
Mike McCoy	209	52	Des Moines, Iowa	won 2013 U.S. Mid-Amateur
Maverick McNealy	2	19	Portola Valley, California	won 2015 Haskins Award and Jack Nicklaus Award
Jordan Niebrugge	19	22	Mequon, Wisconsin	won 2013 U.S. Amateur Public Links, Western Amateur; finished T6 in 2015 Open Championship
Robby Shelton	8	19	Wilmer, Alabama	played on 2015 Palmer Cup team
Hunter Stewart	4	22	Lexington, Kentucky	played on 2015 Palmer Cup team

& Team Great Britain & Ireland
Name	Rank	Age	Hometown	Notes
(Wales) Nigel Edwards		47	Whitchurch, Cardiff, Wales	non-playing captain
(England) Ashley Chesters	7	26	Hawkstone Park, England	won the 2013 and 2014 European Amateur
(Republic of Ireland) Paul Dunne	25	22	Greystones, Ireland	played on 2014 Eisenhower Trophy and Palmer Cup teams
(Scotland) Grant Forrest	45	22	Craigielaw, Scotland	runner-up in 2015 Amateur Championship
(Scotland) Ewen Ferguson	34	19	Glasgow, Scotland	won 2013 Boys Amateur, 2015 Scottish Champion of Champions, Craigmillar Park Open
(Republic of Ireland) Jack Hume	43	21	Naas, Ireland	won 2014 West of Ireland Amateur Open
(Republic of Ireland) Gary Hurley	29	22	West Waterford, Ireland	played on 2015 Palmer Cup team
(Scotland) Jack McDonald	71	22	Kilmarnock, Scotland	played on 2014 Palmer Cup team
(Republic of Ireland) Gavin Moynihan	28	20	The Island, Ireland	won 2015 Irish Amateur Open Championship
(England) Jimmy Mullen	93	21	Royal North Devon, England	won 2015 Welsh Open Stroke Play Championship
(Northern Ireland) Cormac Sharvin	20	22	Ardglass, Northern Ireland	won 2015 Brabazon Trophy

Note: "Rank" is the World Amateur Golf Ranking as of 26 August 2015.

Sam Horsfield was originally named to the GB&I team but withdrew and was replaced by Ewen Ferguson.

== Saturday's matches ==
=== Morning foursomes ===
&	Results
Chesters/Mullen	(United Kingdom) (Republic of Ireland) 3 & 2	McNealy/Stewart
Dunne/Hurley	(United States) 3 & 2	Hossler/McCarthy
Sharvin/McDonald	(United Kingdom) (Republic of Ireland) 5 & 4	Niebrugge/Shelton
Hume/Moynihan	(United Kingdom) (Republic of Ireland) 3 & 2	McCoy/McCoy
3	Foursomes	1
3	Overall	1

=== Afternoon singles ===
&	Results
Ashley Chesters	halved	Bryson DeChambeau
Paul Dunne	(United States) 2 up	Hunter Stewart
Grant Forrest	(United States) 2 & 1	Scott Harvey
Jimmy Mullen	(United Kingdom) (Republic of Ireland) 2 up	Denny McCarthy
Ewen Ferguson	(United Kingdom) (Republic of Ireland) 1 up	Maverick McNealy
Garry Hurley	halved	Robby Shelton
Jack Hume	(United States) 1 up	Beau Hossler
Gavin Moynihan	(United Kingdom) (Republic of Ireland) 4 & 2	Jordan Niebrugge
4	Singles	4
7	Overall	5

== Sunday's matches ==
=== Morning foursomes ===
&	Results
Chesters/Mullen	(United Kingdom) (Republic of Ireland) 3 & 2	Hossler/McCarthy
Dunne/Hurley	(United Kingdom) (Republic of Ireland) 1 up	McCoy/Harvey
Sharvin/McDonald	(United Kingdom) (Republic of Ireland) 2 up	Stewart/McCoy
Hume/Moynihan	(United States) 3 & 2	DeChambeau/Shelton
3	Foursomes	1
10	Overall	6

=== Afternoon singles ===
&	Results
Ashley Chesters	(United Kingdom) (Republic of Ireland) 3 & 1	Jordan Niebrugge
Paul Dunne	halved	Maverick McNealy
Jimmy Mullen	(United Kingdom) (Republic of Ireland) 3 & 2	Denny McCarthy
Cormac Sharvin	(United Kingdom) (Republic of Ireland) 4 & 3	Mike McCoy
Ewen Ferguson	(United States) 1 up	Beau Hossler
Grant Forrest	(United Kingdom) (Republic of Ireland) 2 & 1	Scott Harvey
Gary Hurley	(United Kingdom) (Republic of Ireland) 1 up	Hunter Stewart
Jack McDonald	halved	Lee McCoy
Jack Hume	halved	Robby Shelton
Gavin Moynihan	(United States) 6 & 5	Bryson DeChambeau
6½	Singles	3½
16½	Overall	9½
