= 2016 European Tour Qualifying School graduates =

This is a list of the 30 players who earned 2017 European Tour cards through Q School in 2016.

Place	Player	European Tour starts	Cuts made	Notes
1	(England) Nathan Kimsey	0	0	
T2	(Argentina) Ricardo González	398	248	4 European Tour wins; oldest-ever European Tour Q School graduate (47 years, 24 days)
T2	(Scotland) Scott Henry	54	28	1 Challenge Tour win
T2	(Italy) Edoardo Molinari	219	129	2 European Tour wins
T5	(England) Steven Tiley	26	13	
T5	(Sweden) Jens Fahrbring	38	12	2 Challenge Tour wins
T5	(Sweden) Anton Karlsson	0	0	
T5	(England) Eddie Pepperell	99	56	1 Challenge Tour win
T9	(England) John Parry	176	80	1 European Tour win
T9	(England) Matthew Nixon	128	64	
T11	(Argentina) Rafael Echenique	155	69	2 Challenge Tour wins
T11	(Sweden) Sebastian Söderberg	9	6	1 Challenge Tour win
T11	(England) Paul Maddy	29	10	
T11	(South Korea) Yang Yong-eun	128	75	Won 2009 PGA Championship; 2 other European Tour wins; 1 other PGA Tour win
T11	(England) Tom Lewis	125	67	1 European Tour win
T16	(Wales) Stuart Manley	178	73	1 Challenge Tour win
T16	(England) Ashley Chesters	4	2	Two-time European Amateur champion
T16	(Denmark) Jeff Winther	28	8	
T19	(Germany) Sebastian Heisele	5	1	
T19	(England) Laurie Canter	21	7	
T19	(Sweden) Pontus Widegren	15	4	
T19	(Sweden) Richard S. Johnson	108	55	2 European Tour wins; 1 PGA Tour win
T19	(England) Mark Foster	411	237	1 European Tour win
T19	(England) Max Orrin	16	6	2 Challenge Tour wins
T25	(England) Gary King	4	2	1 Challenge Tour win
T25	(South Africa) Jaco Ahlers	45	23	6 Sunshine Tour wins
T25	(Norway) Espen Kofstad	46	19	3 Challenge Tour wins
T25	(England) Jamie Rutherford	0	0	
T25	(Sweden) Niclas Johansson	2	1	
T25	(England) Richard McEvoy	257	112	1 Challenge Tour win

2017 European Tour rookie

Five of the thirty had competed in the First Stage of 2016 qualifying: Nathan Kimsey, Rafael Echenique, Ashley Chesters, Jamie Rutherford and Niclas Johansson.

== 2017 Results ==
Player	Starts	Cuts made	Best finish	Money list rank	Earnings (€)
(England) Nathan Kimsey*	27	10	T9	147	183,131
(Argentina) Ricardo González	17	7	T10	194	64,394
(Scotland) Scott Henry	21	3	T9	200	58,060
(Italy) Edoardo Molinari	26	12	Win	74	565,741
(England) Steven Tiley	18	5	T22	221	35,219
(Sweden) Jens Fahrbring	26	14	T5	126	265,644
(Sweden) Anton Karlsson*	16	5	T13	191	68,314
(England) Eddie Pepperell	24	15	T3	42	971,898
(England) John Parry	17	3	T19	227	30,705
(England) Matthew Nixon	15	5	T26	233	26,945
(Argentina) Rafael Echenique	16	4	T40	239	24,670
(Sweden) Sebastian Söderberg*	16	10	T7	165	136,408
(England) Paul Maddy	16	9	T11	196	61,990
(South Korea) Yang Yong-eun	7	4	T6	180	94,362
(England) Tom Lewis	21	15	T3	135	227,908
(Wales) Stuart Manley	22	8	T2	148	181,889
(England) Ashley Chesters*	23	16	T8	110	363,113
(Denmark) Jeff Winther	15	10	T14	184	86,107
(Germany) Sebastian Heisele*	20	10	T3	141	210,332
(England) Laurie Canter	19	13	T14	155	163,221
(Sweden) Pontus Widegren*	16	9	T3	167	132,133
(Sweden) Richard S. Johnson	12	4	T14	225	32,920
(England) Mark Foster	22	13	T6	163	138,650
(England) Max Orrin*	12	5	T15	192	68,266
(England) Gary King*	13	3	T14	250	20,545
(South Africa) Jaco Ahlers*	16	9	T11	186	84,185
(Norway) Espen Kofstad	2	2	T20	246	22,018
(England) Jamie Rutherford*	16	6	T25	229	29,625
(Sweden) Niclas Johansson*	13	5	T34	231	27,446
(England) Richard McEvoy	11	7	5	183	87,737

* European Tour rookie in 2017
T = Tied
The player retained his European Tour card for 2018 (finished inside the top 101 or the top 10 of the Access List).
The player did not retain his European Tour card for 2018, but retained conditional status (finished between 102 and 147, inclusive).
The player did not retain his European Tour card for 2018 (finished outside the top 147).

Nixon, Winther, Heisele, Canter, Widegren, and Foster regained their cards for 2018 through Q School.

== Winners on the European Tour in 2017 ==
No.	Date	Player	Tournament	Winning score	Margin of victory	Runner-up
1	16 Apr	(Italy) Edoardo Molinari	Trophée Hassan II	−9 (71-74-70-68=283)	Playoff	(Republic of Ireland) Paul Dunne

== Runners-up on the European Tour in 2017 ==
No.	Date	Player	Tournament	Winner	Winning score	Runner-up score
1	26 Feb	(Wales) Stuart Manley	Joburg Open	(South Africa) Darren Fichardt	−15 (66-66-68=200)*	−14 (67-67-67=201)*

*Tournament shortened to 54 holes due to weather

== See also ==
- 2016 Challenge Tour graduates
- 2017 European Tour
