= LIV Golf Miami =

Professional golf tournament

Tournament information
- Location: Doral, Florida
- Established: 2022
- Courses: Trump National Doral Miami; Blue Monster course
- Par: 72
- Length: 7,510 yards (6,870 m)
- Tour: LIV Golf
- Format: Individual and team stroke play
- Prize fund: US$20,000,000 (individual); US$5,000,000 (team)
- Month played: April

Tournament record score
- Aggregate: 205 Dean Burmester (2024); 205 Sergio García (2024)
- To par: −11 as above

Current champion
- (Australia) Mark Leishman

Final champion
- Location in the United States Location in Florida

LIV Golf Miami is a professional golf tournament organised by LIV Golf in the United States. It is played on the Blue Monster course at Trump National Doral Miami in Doral, Florida. It was first held in October 2022 as the season ending team championship. In 2024, it became a regular season event and was moved to early April, the week prior to the Masters Tournament.

== Format ==
The team championship in 2022 and 2023 was contested as match play over the first two days, and stroke play on the final day. The teams were seeded based on their standings at the end of the regular season, with the top four receiving a bye through to the semi-finals. The highest seeded teams were able to choose their opponents during the match play phase, with ties contested as one foursomes and two singles matches, with all matches played to a result. The final was played as a single 18-hole stroke play round with all four team members scores counting for the team total.

Since 2024, the tournament has been a regular 54-hole individual stroke play event with a concurrent team competition, whereby a set number of the four team members total scores count for the team on each day (Note: In 2023, the best 3 of 4 scores counted towards the team score over the first two rounds and all 4 counted on the final day. In 2024, this was changed so that all four scores counted in every round.) Each round commences with a shotgun start, with the leaders beginning on the first hole for the final round, in order to finish on the eighteenth.

== Winners ==
=== Individual ===
Year	Winner	Score	To par	Margin of victory	Runner-up
2025	(Australia) Marc Leishman	210	−6	1 stroke	(South Africa) Charl Schwartzel
2024	(South Africa) Dean Burmester	205	−11	Playoff	(Spain) Sergio García

=== Team ===
Year	Winners (Note: (c) – Team captain)	Score (to par)	Margin of victory	Runners-up	Ref
2025	Ripper GC (Note: Lucas Herbert, Matt Jones, Mark Leishman, Cameron Smith (c))	+4	8 strokes	Crushers GC (Note: Paul Casey, Bryson DeChambeau (c), Charles Howell III and Anirban Lahiri)	
2024	Legion XIII (Note: Tyrrell Hatton, Jon Rahm (c), Caleb Surratt and Kieran Vincent)	−22	1 stroke	RangeGoats GC (Note: Thomas Pieters, Peter Uihlein, Bubba Watson (c), Matthew Wolff)	
2023	Crushers GC	−11	2 strokes	RangeGoats GC (Note: Talor Gooch, Harold Varner III, Bubba Watson (c), Matthew Wolff)	
2022	4Aces GC (Note: Dustin Johnson (c), Pat Perez, Patrick Reed and Harold Varner III)	−7	1 stroke	Punch GC (Note: Matt Jones, Mark Leishman, Wade Ormsby, Cameron Smith (c))	
