= 2015 Open Championship =

Tournament information
- Dates: 16–20 July 2015
- Location: St Andrews, Scotland; 56.343°N 2.803°W
- Course: Old Course
- Organized by: The R&A
- Tours: European Tour; PGA Tour; Japan Golf Tour

Statistics
- Par: 72
- Length: 7,297 yd (6,672 m)
- Field: 156 players, 80 after cut
- Cut: 144 (E)
- Prize fund: £6,300,000 €8,717,310 $9,831,780
- Winner's share: £1,150,000 €1,591,255 $1,794,690

Champion
- (United States) Zach Johnson
- 273 (−15), playoff

Location map
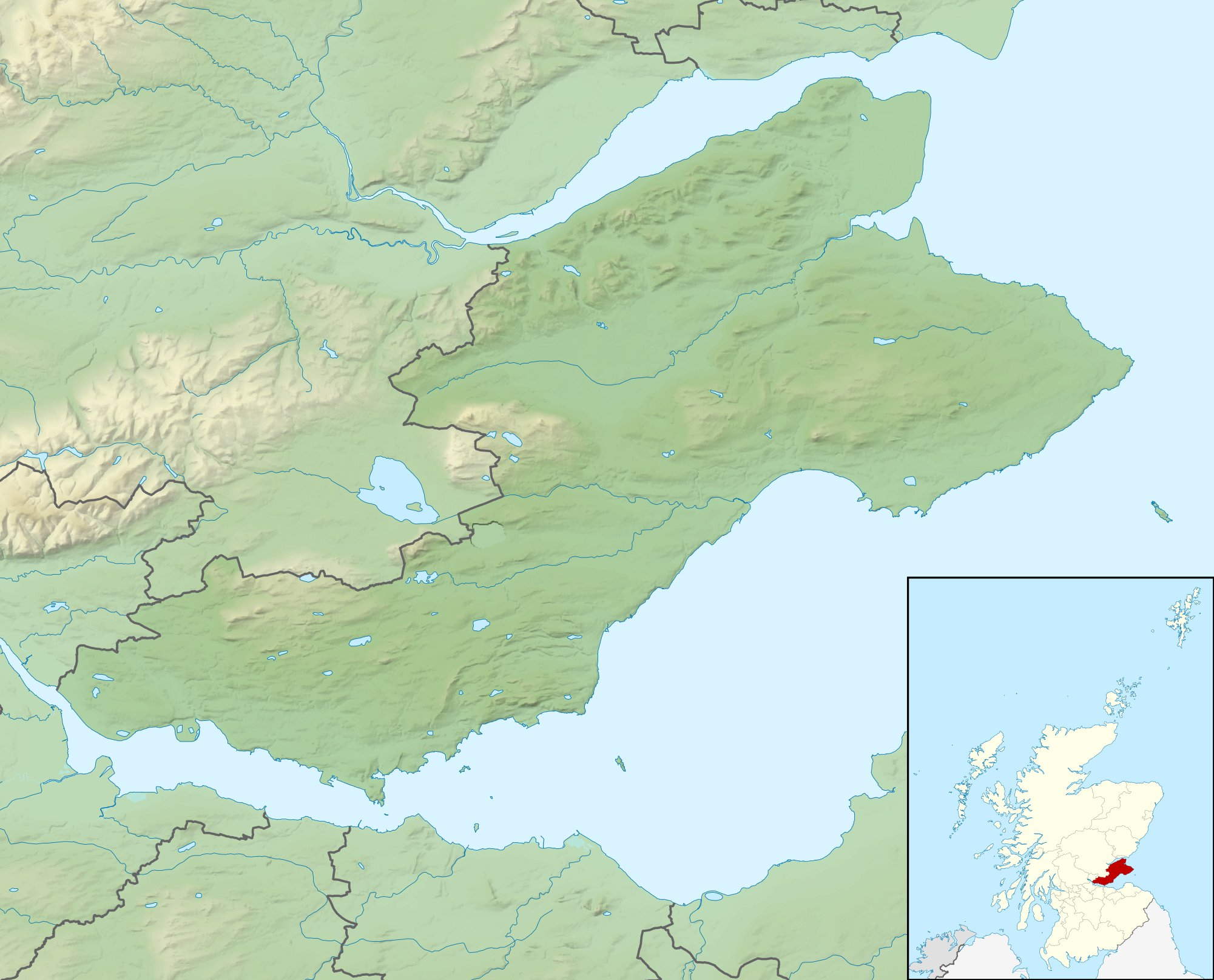
- Location in the United Kingdom Location in Scotland Location in Fife

The 2015 Open Championship was a men's major golf championship and the 144th Open Championship, held from 16 to 20 July at the Old Course at St Andrews in Fife, Scotland. It was the 29th Open Championship played at the course and Zach Johnson won in a four-hole playoff for his second major title.

World number one Rory McIlroy withdrew prior to the tournament due to an off-course ankle injury; he was the first defending champion absent from the Open in over sixty years, since Ben Hogan opted not to participate in 1954. Masters and U.S. Open champion Jordan Spieth attempted to win a third consecutive major and take over the top ranking. He finished one stroke out of the playoff, in a tie for fourth.

Inclement weather – which included heavy rain and very strong winds – forced play to be suspended twice, on Friday and Saturday, with the latter having play suspended for nearly most of the day. The third round was held on Sunday and the final round (and playoff) on Monday.

This was also the last Open Championship played under the then present TV deals with the BBC and ESPN each having their swan song. NBC and Sky Sports would take over coverage the following year at Royal Troon.

This was the final Open appearance for five-time champion Tom Watson and three-time champion Nick Faldo who played in his last major championship.

== Venue ==
The 2015 event is the 29th Open Championship played at the Old Course at St Andrews. The most recent was in 2010 when Louis Oosthuizen won his only major title and became the second South African to win an Open Championship at St Andrews (Bobby Locke is the first, having won at St Andrews in 1957).

Hole	Name	Yards	Par	Hole	Name	Yards	Par
1	Burn	375	4	10	Bobby Jones	386	4
2	Dyke	452	4	11	High (In)	174	3
3	Cartgate (Out)	398	4	12	Heathery (In)	348	4
4	Ginger Beer	480	4	13	Hole O'Cross (In)	465	4
5	Hole O'Cross (Out)	570	5	14	Long	614	5
6	Heathery (Out)	414	4	15	Cartgate (In)	455	4
7	High (Out)	371	4	16	Corner of the Dyke	418	4
8	Short	174	3	17	Road	495	4
9	End	352	4	18	Tom Morris	356	4
Out		3,586	36	In		3,711	36
Source:				Total		7,297	72

Previous lengths of the course for The Open Championship (since 1950):

- 2010: 7,305 yards (6,680 m)
- 2005: 7,279 yards (6,656 m)
- 2000: 7,115 yards (6,506 m)
- 1995: 6,933 yards (6,340 m)
- 1990: 6,933 yards (6,340 m)
- 1984: 6,933 yards (6,340 m)
- 1978: 6,933 yards (6,340 m)
- 1970: 6,957 yards (6,361 m)
- 1964: 6,926 yards (6,333 m)
- 1960: 6,936 yards (6,342 m)
- 1955: 6,936 yards (6,342 m)

== Field ==
=== Criteria and exemptions ===
Each player is classified according to the first category in which he qualified, but other categories are shown in parentheses.

1. The Open Champions aged 60 or under on 19 July 2015

- Mark Calcavecchia (3)
- Stewart Cink (2,3)
- Darren Clarke (2,3)
- Ben Curtis
- John Daly
- David Duval
- Ernie Els (2,3)
- Nick Faldo
- Todd Hamilton
- Pádraig Harrington (2)
- Paul Lawrie
- Tom Lehman
- Justin Leonard (3)
- Sandy Lyle
- Phil Mickelson (2,3,5,15)
- Mark O'Meara
- Louis Oosthuizen (2,3,5,6)
- Tiger Woods (2,3,12)
- Eligible but did not enter: Ian Baker-Finch, Greg Norman, Nick Price
- Rory McIlroy (2,3,4,5,6,7,9,11,13,15) withdrew with an ankle injury.

2. The Open Champions for 2005–2014

3. The Open Champions finishing in the first 10 and tying for 10th place in The Open Championship 2009–2014 (Note: Category 3 was extended from 2010 back to 2009 to enable Watson to make a final Open appearance at St Andrews)

- Tom Watson

4. First 10 and anyone tying for 10th place in the 2014 Open Championship

- Victor Dubuisson (5,6,15)
- Rickie Fowler (5,12,13,15)
- Jim Furyk (5,13,15)
- Sergio García (5,6,13,15)
- Marc Leishman
- Shane Lowry (5,6)
- Graeme McDowell (5,6,15)
- Edoardo Molinari
- Charl Schwartzel (5,6,10)
- Adam Scott (5,10,13)

5. The first 50 players on the Official World Golf Ranking (OWGR) for Week 21, 2015

- Keegan Bradley (11,15)
- Paul Casey
- Jason Day (13)
- Jamie Donaldson (6,15)
- Matt Every
- Branden Grace
- Bill Haas (13)
- J. B. Holmes
- Billy Horschel (13)
- Thongchai Jaidee (6)
- Miguel Ángel Jiménez (6)
- Dustin Johnson (13)
- Zach Johnson (13,15)
- Martin Kaymer (6,9,11,12,13,15)
- Brooks Koepka (6)
- Matt Kuchar (13,15)
- Anirban Lahiri (OQS (Note: Lahiri and Chalmers had already qualified through the Open Qualifying Series prior to meeting exemption criteria.))
- Joost Luiten (6)
- Hunter Mahan (13,15)
- Ben Martin
- Hideki Matsuyama (13)
- Ryan Moore
- Kevin Na (13)
- Ryan Palmer (13)
- Ian Poulter (6,15)
- Patrick Reed (13,15)
- Justin Rose (6,9,13,15)
- Webb Simpson (9,13,15)
- Brandt Snedeker
- Jordan Spieth (9,10,13,15)
- Henrik Stenson (6,15)
- Brendon Todd (13)
- Jimmy Walker (13,15)
- Bubba Watson (10,13,15)
- Lee Westwood (6,15)
- Bernd Wiesberger
- Danny Willett (6)
- Gary Woodland (13)
- Chris Kirk (13) withdrew with a hand injury.

6. First 30 in the Race to Dubai for 2014

- Thomas Bjørn (15)
- Jonas Blixt
- George Coetzee
- Ross Fisher
- Tommy Fleetwood
- Stephen Gallacher (15)
- Mikko Ilonen
- Pablo Larrazábal
- Alexander Lévy
- Marcel Siem
- Marc Warren
- Romain Wattel

7. The BMW PGA Championship winners for 2013–2015

- An Byeong-hun
- Matteo Manassero

8. First 5 European Tour members and any European Tour members tying for 5th place, not otherwise exempt, in the top 20 of the Race to Dubai on completion of the 2015 BMW International Open

- Kiradech Aphibarnrat
- Alex Norén withdrew with an injury.

9. The U.S. Open Champions for 2011–2015

10. The Masters Tournament Champions for 2011–2015

11. The PGA Champions for 2010–2014

- Jason Dufner

12. The Players Champions for 2013–2015

13. The leading 30 qualifiers for the 2014 Tour Championship

- Russell Henley
- Morgan Hoffmann
- Geoff Ogilvy
- John Senden
- Cameron Tringale

14. First 5 PGA Tour members and any PGA Tour members tying for 5th place, not exempt in the top 20 of the PGA Tour FedEx Cup points list for 2015 on completion of the 2015 Travelers Championship

- Steven Bowditch
- Charley Hoffman
- Kevin Kisner
- Robert Streb

15. Playing members of the 2014 Ryder Cup teams

16. First and anyone tying for 1st place on the Order of Merit of the Asian Tour for 2014

- David Lipsky

17. First and anyone tying for 1st place on the Order of Merit of the PGA Tour of Australasia for 2014

- Greg Chalmers (OQS)

18. First and anyone tying for 1st place on the Order of Merit of the Southern Africa PGA Sunshine Tour for 2014

- Thomas Aiken

19. The Japan Open Champion for 2014

- Yuta Ikeda

20. First 2 and anyone tying for 2nd place, not exempt, on the Official Money List of the Japan Golf Tour for 2014

- Hiroyuki Fujita
- Koumei Oda

21. First 2 and anyone tying for 2nd place, in a cumulative money list taken from all official 2015 Japan Golf Tour events up to and including the 2015 Japan Golf Tour Championship

- Adam Bland
- Liang Wenchong

22. The Senior Open Champion for 2014

- Bernhard Langer

23. The Amateur Champion for 2015

- Romain Langasque (a)

24. The U.S. Amateur Champion for 2014

- Gunn Yang (a)

25. The European Amateur Champion for 2014

- Ashley Chesters (a)

26. The Mark H. McCormack Medal winner for 2014

- Ollie Schniederjans (a)

=== Open Qualifying Series ===
The Open Qualifying Series (OQS) consisted of 10 events from the six major tours. Places were available to the leading players (not otherwise exempt) who finished in the top n and ties. In the event of ties, positions went to players ranked highest according to that week's OWGR.

Location	Tournament	Date	Spots	Top	Qualifiers
Australia	Emirates Australian Open	30 Nov	3	10	Greg Chalmers (17), Rod Pampling, Brett Rumford
Thailand	Thailand Golf Championship	14 Dec	4	12	Marcus Fraser, Scott Hend, Anirban Lahiri (5), Jonathan Moore
Africa	Joburg Open	1 Mar	3	10	David Howell, Andy Sullivan, Anthony Wall
Japan	Mizuno Open	31 May	4	12	Scott Strange, Tadahiro Takayama, Taichi Teshima, Shinji Tomimura
Ireland	The Irish Open	31 May	3	10	Tyrrell Hatton, Søren Kjeldsen, Eddie Pepperell
USA	Travelers Championship	28 Jun	4	12	Graham DeLaet, Luke Donald, Brian Harman, Carl Pettersson
France	Alstom Open de France	5 Jul	3	10	Rafa Cabrera-Bello, James Morrison, Jaco van Zyl
USA	Greenbrier Classic	5 Jul	4	12	James Hahn, David Hearn, Danny Lee, Greg Owen
Scotland	Scottish Open	12 Jul	3	10	Daniel Brooks, Raphaël Jacquelin, Rikard Karlberg
USA	John Deere Classic	12 Jul	1	5	Tom Gillis

=== Final Qualifying ===
The Final Qualifying events were played on 30 June at four courses covering Scotland and the North-West, Central and South-coast regions of England. Three qualifying places were available at each location.

Location	Qualifiers (Note: (a) – indicates the player was an amateur.) (Note: (R) – indicates a golfer who came through Regional Qualifying.)
Gailes Links	Ryan Fox, Paul Kinnear (a, R), Mark Young (R)
Hillside	Scott Arnold, Pelle Edberg, Jordan Niebrugge (a)
Royal Cinque Ports	Alister Balcombe (a, R), Gary Boyd, Ben Taylor (a, R)
Woburn	Robert Dinwiddie, Paul Dunne (a), Retief Goosen

=== Alternates ===
To make up the full field of 156, additional places were allocated in ranking order from the Official World Golf Ranking at the time that these places were made available by the Championship Committee. Any places made available after the 5 July 2015 used the week 27 rankings.

From the Week 26 (week ending 29 June) Official World Golf Ranking:

- Francesco Molinari (ranked 43)
- Matt Jones (67)
- David Lingmerth (72)
- Harris English (74)
- Daniel Berger (75)
- Tim Clark (71) withdrew.

From the Week 27 (week ending 5 July) Official World Golf Ranking:

- Russell Knox (ranked 77) (Note: Knox replaced Rory McIlroy.)
- Kevin Streelman (80) (Note: Streelman replaced Chris Kirk.)
- Hiroshi Iwata (81) (Note: Iwata replaced Alex Norén.)
- Richie Ramsay (82) (Note: Ramsay replaced Tim Clark.)

== Round summaries ==
=== First round ===
Thursday, 16 July 2015

Dustin Johnson posted a seven-under-par 65 on day one to lead by one shot from a group of six golfers. Jordan Spieth was two shots off the lead after carding a 67.

Place	Player	Score	To par
1	(United States) Dustin Johnson	65	−7
T2	(Australia) Jason Day	66	−6
T2	(South Africa) Retief Goosen	66	−6
T2	(United States) Zach Johnson	66	−6
T2	(Scotland) Paul Lawrie	66	−6
T2	(United States) Robert Streb	66	−6
T2	(England) Danny Willett	66	−6
T8	(United States) Kevin Na	67	−5
T8	(United States) Jordan Niebrugge (a)	67	−5
T8	(South Africa) Louis Oosthuizen	67	−5
T8	(South Africa) Charl Schwartzel	67	−5
T8	(United States) Jordan Spieth	67	−5

*The last group completed play at approximately 9:36 pm. BST (UTC+1)

=== Second round ===
Friday and Saturday, 17–18 July 2015

The first group teed-off at 6:32 am BST on Friday, but heavy rain caused localised flooding and play was suspended at 6:46 am. Restarted at 10 am; later tee times were delayed over three hours. The tee time for the 52nd and last group was delayed from the original 4:13 pm to 7:27 pm. The second round was not completed on Friday and 42 players returned early Saturday to finish their rounds.

Dustin Johnson was the overnight leader on 10-under-par after 13 holes, a stroke ahead of Danny Willett. The day marked the final Open appearance of five-time champion Tom Watson at age 65.

Play resumed on Saturday at 7 am, with the third round due to start at 11 am. However, play was soon suspended at 7:32 am because a strong wind was moving stationary balls on some of the greens. Because it was a non-dangerous situation, players were allowed to complete the hole they were playing. Dustin Johnson had bogeyed the 14th to move back to 9-under-par, tied for the lead with Willett.

After a delay of several hours, it was decided that only the remainder of the second round would be competed on Saturday, with the third round scheduled for Sunday and the fourth round for Monday. Play finally resumed at 6 pm, a 10½ hour delay, and was completed after 9 pm. The 36-hole cut was at even par 144 and eighty players advanced to the third round.

Place	Player	Score	To par
1	(United States) Dustin Johnson	65-69=134	−10
2	(England) Danny Willett	66-69=135	−9
3	(Scotland) Paul Lawrie	66-70=136	−8
T4	(Australia) Jason Day	66-71=137	−7
T4	(United States) Zach Johnson	66-71=137	−7
T4	(South Africa) Louis Oosthuizen	67-70=137	−7
T4	(Australia) Adam Scott	70-67=137	−7
T4	(United States) Robert Streb	66-71=137	−7
T4	(Scotland) Marc Warren	68-69=137	−7
T10	(England) Luke Donald	68-70=138	−6
T10	(Republic of Ireland) Paul Dunne (a)	69-69=138	−6
T10	(South Africa) Retief Goosen	66-72=138	−6
T10	(Japan) Hideki Matsuyama	72-66=138	−6

*The last group completed play Saturday at approximately 9:19 pm.

Amateurs: Dunne (−6), Niebrugge (−4), Langasque (−3), Schniederjans (−2), Chesters (−1), Kinnear (+2), Yang (+6), Balcombe (+6), Taylor (+11)

=== Third round ===
Sunday, 19 July 2015

Amateur Paul Dunne was in a share of the lead after the third round along with Louis Oosthuizen and Jason Day. No amateur had led the Open after three rounds since 1927.

Place	Player	Score	To par
T1	(Australia) Jason Day	66-71-67=204	−12
T1	(Republic of Ireland) Paul Dunne (a)	69-69-66=204	−12
T1	(South Africa) Louis Oosthuizen	67-70-67=204	−12
4	(United States) Jordan Spieth	67-72-66=205	−11
5	(Republic of Ireland) Pádraig Harrington	72-69-65=206	−10
T6	(Spain) Sergio García	70-69-68=207	−9
T6	(South Africa) Retief Goosen	66-72-69=207	−9
T6	(United States) Zach Johnson	66-71-70=207	−9
T6	(Australia) Marc Leishman	70-73-64=207	−9
T6	(United States) Jordan Niebrugge (a)	67-73-67=207	−9
T6	(England) Justin Rose	71-68-68=207	−9
T6	(Australia) Adam Scott	70-67-70=207	−9
T6	(United States) Robert Streb	66-71-70=207	−9
T6	(England) Danny Willett	66-69-72=207	−9

*The last group completed play Sunday at approximately 7:04 pm.

Amateurs: Dunne (−12), Niebrugge (−9), Chesters (−6), Schniederjans (−4), Langasque (−4)

=== Final round ===
Monday, 20 July 2015

Marc Leishman carded a 66 in the final round to have the lead in the clubhouse at −15 while the final pairings were beginning their back nine. Zach Johnson then birdied the 18th to also card a 66 and tie the clubhouse lead with Leishman. The second to last group of the round were Jason Day and Jordan Spieth. Day and Spieth both headed to the par-4 16th at −14, one shot back of Leishman and Johnson. Spieth hit a difficult putt to birdie to get to -15, while Day parred. On the famous par-4 17th "Road Hole," an errant approach shot by Spieth resulted in a bogey and he was back at −14. Day was unable to convert a difficult birdie putt and remained at −14 as well. At the 18th, Spieth's approach shot was short, in the "Valley of Sin" below the green; he almost holed the chip for birdie, but settled for par and 274 (−14). Day was left with a 15-foot (4.5 m) birdie putt to join the playoff, but could not convert and also ended a stroke back at 274.

The final pairing was Louis Oosthuizen and amateur Paul Dunne, who was at even par 36 out, but was four-over on the next four holes, fell out of contention, and tied for thirtieth place. Oosthuizen played a solid round and needed a birdie at 18 to get into the playoff with Leishman and Johnson. His approach shot left him with a 10-foot (3 m) birdie putt, which he sunk. The Open Championship's rules dictated there would be a four-hole aggregate score playoff between Johnson, Leishman, and Oosthuizen. Johnson took the early lead on the first and never looked back, winning by a stroke over Oosthuizen. The win was Johnson's second major championship victory; he won the Masters eight years earlier in 2007.

==== Final leaderboard ====
Champion
Silver Medal winner (low amateur)
(a) = amateur
(c) = past champion

Place	Player	Score	To par	Money (£)
T1	(United States) Zach Johnson	66-71-70-66=273	−15	Playoff
T1	(Australia) Marc Leishman	70-73-64-66=273	−15	Playoff
T1	(South Africa) Louis Oosthuizen (c)	67-70-67-69=273	−15	Playoff
T4	(Australia) Jason Day	66-71-67-70=274	−14	295,000
T4	(United States) Jordan Spieth	67-72-66-69=274	−14	295,000
T6	(Spain) Sergio García	70-69-68-70=277	−11	196,000
T6	(United States) Jordan Niebrugge (a)	67-73-67-70=277	−11	0
T6	(England) Justin Rose	71-68-68-70=277	−11	196,000
T6	(England) Danny Willett	66-69-72-70=277	−11	196,000
T10	(United States) Brooks Koepka	71-70-69-68=278	−10	138,500
T10	(Australia) Adam Scott	70-67-70-71=278	−10	138,500

Leaderboard below the top 10
Place	Player	Score	To par	Money (£)
T12	(England) Ashley Chesters (a)	71-72-67-69=279	−9	0
T12	(England) Luke Donald	68-70-73-68=279	−9	103,875
T12	(Germany) Martin Kaymer	71-70-70-68=279	−9	103,875
T12	(United States) Ollie Schniederjans (a)	70-72-70-67=279	−9	0
T12	(United States) Brendon Todd	71-73-69-66=279	−9	103,875
T12	(England) Anthony Wall	70-71-68-70=279	−9	103,875
T18	(Japan) Hideki Matsuyama	72-66-71-71=280	−8	82,750
T18	(United States) Robert Streb	66-71-70-73=280	−8	82,750
T20	(United States) Stewart Cink (c)	70-71-68-72=281	−7	61,475
T20	(Australia) Marcus Fraser	74-69-68-70=281	−7	61,475
T20	(South Africa) Retief Goosen	66-72-69-74=281	−7	61,475
T20	(South Africa) Branden Grace	69-72-73-67=281	−7	61,475
T20	(Republic of Ireland) Pádraig Harrington (c)	72-69-65-75=281	−7	61,475
T20	(United States) Russell Henley	74-66-72-69=281	−7	61,475
T20	(United States) Phil Mickelson (c)	70-72-70-69=281	−7	61,475
T20	(England) James Morrison	71-71-70-69=281	−7	61,475
T20	(England) Greg Owen	68-73-71-69=281	−7	61,475
T20	(United States) Patrick Reed	72-70-67-72=281	−7	61,475
T30	(Australia) Steven Bowditch	70-69-69-74=282	−6	40,417
T30	(Republic of Ireland) Paul Dunne (a)	69-69-66-78=282	−6	0
T30	(United States) Rickie Fowler	72-71-66-73=282	−6	40,417
T30	(United States) Jim Furyk	73-71-66-72=282	−6	40,417
T30	(United States) Billy Horschel	73-71-71-67=282	−6	40,417
T30	(Australia) Matt Jones	68-73-69-72=282	−6	40,417
T30	(India) Anirban Lahiri	69-70-71-72=282	−6	40,417
T30	(United States) Ryan Palmer	71-71-67-73=282	−6	40,417
T30	(England) Andy Sullivan	72-71-68-71=282	−6	40,417
T30	(United States) Jimmy Walker	72-68-71-71=282	−6	40,417
T40	(Australia) Scott Arnold	71-73-73-66=283	−5	27,861
T40	(Spain) Rafa Cabrera-Bello	71-73-68-71=283	−5	27,861
T40	(Scotland) Paul Lawrie (c)	66-70-74-73=283	−5	27,861
T40	(Italy) Francesco Molinari	72-71-73-67=283	−5	27,861
T40	(Australia) Geoff Ogilvy	71-68-72-72=283	−5	27,861
T40	(Australia) John Senden	72-72-68-71=283	−5	27,861
T40	(United States) Webb Simpson	70-70-71-72=283	−5	27,861
T40	(Sweden) Henrik Stenson	73-70-71-69=283	−5	27,861
T40	(Scotland) Marc Warren	68-69-72-74=283	−5	27,861
T49	(Wales) Jamie Donaldson	72-71-71-70=284	−4	18,728
T49	(United States) David Duval (c)	72-72-67-73=284	−4	18,728
T49	(New Zealand) Ryan Fox	72-69-76-67=284	−4	18,728
T49	(England) David Howell	68-73-73-70=284	−4	18,728
T49	(United States) Dustin Johnson	65-69-75-75=284	−4	18,728
T49	(United States) Hunter Mahan	72-72-67-73=284	−4	18,728
T49	(Northern Ireland) Graeme McDowell	72-72-70-70=284	−4	18,728
T49	(England) Eddie Pepperell	72-70-66-76=284	−4	18,728
T49	(England) Lee Westwood	71-73-69-71=284	−4	18,728
T58	(Australia) Greg Chalmers	70-71-69-75=285	−3	15,907
T58	(United States) Jason Dufner	73-71-67-74=285	−3	15,907
T58	(United States) Matt Kuchar	71-73-70-71=285	−3	15,907
T58	(United States) David Lipsky	73-69-70-73=285	−3	15,907
T58	(United States) Kevin Na	67-75-70-73=285	−3	15,907
T58	(United States) Cameron Tringale	71-71-73-70=285	−3	15,907
T58	(United States) Gary Woodland	72-70-71-72=285	−3	15,907
T65	(South Africa) Ernie Els (c)	71-73-69-73=286	−2	15,350
T65	(Thailand) Thongchai Jaidee	72-71-70-73=286	−2	15,350
T65	(France) Romain Langasque (a)	69-72-71-74=286	−2	0
T68	(Canada) Graham DeLaet	71-73-68-75=287	−1	14,950
T68	(United States) Harris English	71-72-69-75=287	−1	14,950
T68	(England) Ross Fisher	71-73-72-71=287	−1	14,950
T68	(Scotland) Richie Ramsay	72-71-70-74=287	−1	14,950
T68	(South Africa) Charl Schwartzel	67-72-69-79=287	−1	14,950
T68	(Austria) Bernd Wiesberger	72-72-71-72=287	−1	14,950
T74	(England) Paul Casey	70-71-75-72=288	E	14,450
T74	(Sweden) David Lingmerth	69-72-70-77=288	E	14,450
T74	(United States) Ben Martin	74-70-67-77=288	E	14,450
T74	(Australia) Brett Rumford	71-71-71-75=288	E	14,450
T78	(Germany) Bernhard Langer	74-70-73-72=289	+1	14,150
T78	(United States) Mark O'Meara (c)	72-72-71-74=289	+1	14,150
80	(South Africa) Thomas Aiken	75-69-72-74=290	+2	14,000
CUT	(United States) John Daly (c)	71-74=145	+1	
CUT	(France) Victor Dubuisson	74-71=145	+1	
CUT	(England) Tommy Fleetwood	69-76=145	+1	
CUT	(United States) Brian Harman	73-72=145	+1	
CUT	(Finland) Mikko Ilonen	75-70=145	+1	
CUT	(Sweden) Rikard Karlberg	70-75=145	+1	
CUT	(United States) Kevin Kisner	71-74=145	+1	
CUT	(Spain) Pablo Larrazábal	76-69=145	+1	
CUT	(France) Alexander Lévy	70-75=145	+1	
CUT	(Republic of Ireland) Shane Lowry	73-72=145	+1	
CUT	(Sweden) Carl Pettersson	72-73=145	+1	
CUT	(Germany) Marcel Siem	70-75=145	+1	
CUT	(South Korea) An Byeong-hun	74-72=146	+2	
CUT	(Sweden) Jonas Blixt	75-71=146	+2	
CUT	(Northern Ireland) Darren Clarke (c)	73-73=146	+2	
CUT	(Sweden) Pelle Edberg	72-74=146	+2	
CUT	(Japan) Hiroyuki Fujita	71-75=146	+2	
CUT	(Scotland) Stephen Gallacher	73-73=146	+2	
CUT	(England) Tyrrell Hatton	70-76=146	+2	
CUT	(Australia) Scott Hend	74-72=146	+2	
CUT	(France) Raphaël Jacquelin	76-70=146	+2	
CUT	(England) Paul Kinnear (a)	70-76=146	+2	
CUT	(Scotland) Russell Knox	72-74=146	+2	
CUT	(Netherlands) Joost Luiten	74-72=146	+2	
CUT	(Italy) Matteo Manassero	73-73=146	+2	
CUT	(United States) Brandt Snedeker	73-73=146	+2	
CUT	(United States) Keegan Bradley	75-72=147	+3	
CUT	(South Africa) George Coetzee	74-73=147	+3	
CUT	(Canada) David Hearn	74-73=147	+3	
CUT	(United States) J. B. Holmes	73-74=147	+3	
CUT	(New Zealand) Danny Lee	73-74=147	+3	
CUT	(Scotland) Sandy Lyle (c)	71-76=147	+3	
CUT	(United States) Ryan Moore	74-73=147	+3	
CUT	(England) Ian Poulter	73-74=147	+3	
CUT	(Japan) Tadahiro Takayama	75-72=147	+3	
CUT	(Japan) Shinji Tomimura	73-74=147	+3	
CUT	(United States) Bubba Watson	71-76=147	+3	
CUT	(Thailand) Kiradech Aphibarnrat	73-75=148	+4	
CUT	(United States) James Hahn	75-73=148	+4	
CUT	(Japan) Yuta Ikeda	74-74=148	+4	
CUT	(Spain) Miguel Ángel Jiménez	75-73=148	+4	
CUT	(Denmark) Søren Kjeldsen	75-73=148	+4	
CUT	(United States) Tom Lehman (c)	75-73=148	+4	
CUT	(South Africa) Jaco van Zyl	79-69=148	+4	
CUT	(France) Romain Wattel	75-73=148	+4	
CUT	(England) Mark Young	74-74=148	+4	
CUT	(United States) Daniel Berger	73-76=149	+5	
CUT	(Denmark) Thomas Bjørn	70-79=149	+5	
CUT	(Australia) Adam Bland	75-74=149	+5	
CUT	(England) Daniel Brooks	76-73=149	+5	
CUT	(United States) Ben Curtis (c)	74-75=149	+5	
CUT	(United States) Bill Haas	75-74=149	+5	
CUT	(United States) Morgan Hoffmann	73-76=149	+5	
CUT	(Japan) Hiroshi Iwata	79-70=149	+5	
CUT	(Italy) Edoardo Molinari	74-75=149	+5	
CUT	(Japan) Koumei Oda	73-76=149	+5	
CUT	(Japan) Taichi Teshima	76-73=149	+5	
CUT	(England) Alister Balcombe (a)	74-76=150	+6	
CUT	(England) Robert Dinwiddie	73-77=150	+6	
CUT	(United States) Tom Gillis	76-74=150	+6	
CUT	(United States) Charley Hoffman	72-78=150	+6	
CUT	(United States) Justin Leonard (c)	78-72=150	+6	
CUT	(China) Liang Wenchong	80-70=150	+6	
CUT	(Australia) Scott Strange	77-73=150	+6	
CUT	(United States) Kevin Streelman	78-72=150	+6	
CUT	(South Korea) Gunn Yang (a)	73-77=150	+6	
CUT	(United States) Matt Every	73-78=151	+7	
CUT	(United States) Todd Hamilton (c)	74-77=151	+7	
CUT	(United States) Tiger Woods (c)	76-75=151	+7	
CUT	(United States) Jonathan Moore	74-78=152	+8	
CUT	(Australia) Rod Pampling	77-75=152	+8	
CUT	(England) Nick Faldo (c)	83-71=154	+10	
CUT	(United States) Mark Calcavecchia (c)	80-75=155	+11	
CUT	(England) Ben Taylor (a)	82-73=155	+11	
CUT	(United States) Tom Watson (c)	76-80=156	+12	
CUT	(England) Gary Boyd	77-80=157	+13	

==== Scorecard ====
Hole	1	2	3	4	5	6	7	8	9	10	11	12	13	14	15	16	17	18
Par	4	4	4	4	5	4	4	3	4	4	3	4	4	5	4	4	4	4
(United States) Johnson	−9	−10	−10	−11	−12	−12	−13	−13	−14	−15	−15	−16	−15	−15	−15	−15	−14	−15
(Australia) Leishman	−10	−10	−11	−12	−13	−13	−13	−13	−14	−15	−15	−16	−16	−16	−16	−15	−15	−15
(South Africa) Oosthuizen	−13	−13	−13	−13	−13	−14	−14	−13	−14	−14	−14	−15	−14	−14	−14	−14	−14	−15
(Australia) Day	−12	−12	−12	−12	−13	−14	−14	−14	−14	−14	−14	−14	−14	−14	−14	−14	−14	−14
(United States) Spieth	−12	−12	−12	−12	−13	−14	−14	−12	−13	−14	−14	−14	−14	−14	−14	−15	−14	−14
(Spain) García	−10	−10	−11	−11	−12	−12	−13	−13	−13	−14	−14	−13	−12	−12	−12	−12	−11	−11
(United States) Niebrugge	−9	−9	−9	−10	−11	−12	−12	−12	−12	−12	−12	−12	−12	−13	−12	−12	−11	−11
(England) Rose	−9	−9	−9	−9	−10	−10	−10	−10	−10	−10	−10	−11	−10	−10	−10	−10	−10	−11
(England) Willett	−10	−10	−10	−9	−9	−9	−9	−8	−8	−8	−9	−10	−11	−12	−12	−12	−11	−11
(Republic of Ireland) Harrington	−11	−12	−12	−12	−13	−11	−11	−10	−10	−10	−11	−11	−11	−10	−9	−10	−8	−7
(Republic of Ireland) Dunne	−11	−10	−11	−11	−12	−12	−12	−12	−12	−11	−11	−10	−8	−8	−8	−8	−7	−6

Cumulative tournament scores, relative to par

Birdie	Bogey	Double bogey

=== Playoff ===
This was the ninth four-hole playoff at the Open Championship, first used in 1989. The last playoff at St Andrews was twenty years earlier in 1995.

Johnson and Oosthuizen birdied the first while Leishman bogeyed; Johnson birdied the second and then the routing switched over to the Road Hole (#17), which all three bogeyed. All three made par at 18 and Johnson won the Claret Jug by a stroke.

Place	Player	Score	To par	Money (£)
1	(United States) Zach Johnson	3-3-5-4=15	−1	1,150,000
T2	(South Africa) Louis Oosthuizen	3-4-5-4=16	E	536,500
T2	(Australia) Marc Leishman	5-4-5-4=18	+2	536,500

- Four-hole aggregate playoff on holes 1, 2, 17, and 18

==== Scorecard ====
Hole	1	2	17	18
Par	4	4	4	4
(United States) Johnson	−1	−2	−1	−1
(South Africa) Oosthuizen	−1	−1	E	E
(Australia) Leishman	+1	+1	+2	+2

Cumulative playoff scores, relative to par
