= Ashley Chesters =

English golfer (born 1989)

Personal information
- Full name: Ashley John Warburton Chesters
- Nationality: England
- Born: 25 August 1989 (age 37) Shrewsbury, England

Career
- Sport: Golf
- Turned professional: 2015
- Current tour: Challenge Tour
- Former tour: European Tour

Best results in major championships
- Masters Tournament: DNP
- PGA Championship: DNP
- U.S. Open: DNP
- The Open Championship: T12: 2015

Ashley John Warburton Chesters (born 25 August 1989) is an English professional golfer.

== Amateur career ==
Chesters won the European Amateur in 2014 and 2015, the first golfer to win it twice. These wins qualified him for the 2014 and 2015 Open Championships. In 2014 he scored 70 and 77 to miss the cut by one stroke. In 2015 Chesters scored 71 and 72 to make the cut and then scored 67 and 69 to finished tied for 12th place.

In 2014 Chesters played in the Bonallack Trophy, the St Andrews Trophy and the Eisenhower Trophy. He played in the 2015 Walker Cup at Royal Lytham & St Annes Golf Club, scoring 3½ points in a Great Britain and Ireland team that won 16½–9½.

== Professional career ==
Chesters turned professional after the 2015 Walker Cup. In 2016 he played on the Challenge Tour. He finished tied for 16th place in the 2016 European Tour Qualifying School to earn his place on the 2017 European Tour.

Since joining the European Tour in 2017 his best finish has been 4th place in the 2018 Andalucía Valderrama Masters.

== Amateur wins ==
- 2011 Lee Westwood Trophy
- 2013 European Amateur
- 2014 European Amateur

== Results in major championships ==
Tournament	2014	2015	2016	2017	2018	2019	2020	2021	2022
The Open Championship	CUT	T12					NT		CUT

Did not play

CUT = missed the half-way cut
"T" = tied
NT = No tournament due to the COVID-19 pandemic
Note: Chesters only played in The Open Championship.

== Team appearances ==
Amateur

- European Amateur Team Championship (representing England): 2014, 2015
- Bonallack Trophy (representing Europe): 2014 (winners)
- St Andrews Trophy (representing Great Britain & Ireland): 2014 (winners)
- Eisenhower Trophy (representing England): 2014
- Walker Cup (representing Great Britain & Ireland): 2015 (winners)

== See also ==
- 2016 European Tour Qualifying School graduates
