= 2014 Open Championship =

2014 golf tournament held at the Royal Liverpool Golf Club, Hoylake, Wirral, England

Coordinates: 53.385°N 3.190°W

Tournament information
- Dates: 17–20 July 2014
- Location: Merseyside, England
- Course: Royal Liverpool Golf Club
- Organized by: The R&A
- Tours: European Tour; PGA Tour; Japan Golf Tour

Statistics
- Par: 72
- Length: 7,312 yd (6,686 m)
- Field: 156 players, 72 after cut
- Cut: 146 (+2)
- Prize fund: £5.400 million €6.776 million $9.226 million
- Winner's share: £975,000 €1,223,450 $1,665,788

Champion
- (Northern Ireland) Rory McIlroy
- 271 (−17)

Location in England
Royal Liverpool Golf Club in Hoylake, Merseyside, west of Liverpool, England

The 2014 Open Championship was a men's major golf championship and the 143rd Open Championship, held from 17 to 20 July at Royal Liverpool Golf Club in Merseyside, England.

Rory McIlroy won his first Open Championship, two strokes ahead of runners-up Rickie Fowler and Sergio García, and became only the sixth to win the championship going wire-to-wire after 72 holes (being the sole leader after each round). It was McIlroy's third major title, having won the U.S. Open in 2011 and the PGA Championship in 2012; he became the first European to win three different majors and joined Jack Nicklaus and Tiger Woods as the only three (since the first Masters Tournament in 1934) to win three majors by the age of 25.

== Venue ==
The 2014 event was the twelfth Open Championship played at Royal Liverpool Golf Club. The most recent was in 2006, with Tiger Woods winning his second consecutive Open Championship title, holding off Chris DiMarco with a two-shot victory. The first open at the venue was in 1897, won by amateur Harold Hilton by a stroke ahead of James Braid.

Hole	Name	Yards	Par	Hole	Name	Yards	Par
1	17 – Royal	458	4	10	8 – Far	532	5
2	18 – Stand	454	4	11	9 – Punch Bowl	391	4
3	1 – Course	426	4	12	10 – Dee	447	4
4	2 – Road	372	4	13	11 – Alps	194	3
5	3 – Long	528	5	14	12 – Hilbre	454	4
6	4 – New	201	3	15	13 – Rushes	161	3
7	5 – Telegraph	480	4	16	14 – Field	577	5
8	6 – Briars	431	4	17	15 – Lake	458	4
9	7 – Dowie	197	3	18	16 – Dun	551	5
Out		3,547	35	In		3,765	37
Source				Total		7,312	72

Lengths of the course for previous Opens (since 1947):

- 2006: 7,258 yards (6,637 m), par 72
- 1967: 6,995 yards (6,396 m), par 72
- 1956: 6,960 yards (6,364 m), par 71
- 1947: 6,978 yards (6,381 m), par 68

== Field ==
=== Criteria and exemptions ===
Each player is classified according to the first category in which he qualified, but other categories are shown in parentheses.

1. The Open Champions aged 60 or under on 20 July 2014

- Stewart Cink (2,3)
- Darren Clarke (2,3)
- Ben Curtis
- John Daly
- David Duval
- Ernie Els (2,3,6,15)
- Nick Faldo
- Todd Hamilton (2)
- Pádraig Harrington (2)
- Paul Lawrie
- Justin Leonard (3)
- Sandy Lyle
- Phil Mickelson (2,3,4,5,10,13,15)
- Louis Oosthuizen (2,3,5,15)
- Tiger Woods (2,3,4,5,12,13,15)
- Eligible but did not enter: Ian Baker-Finch, Greg Norman, Nick Price
- Tom Lehman withdrew for family reasons.
- Mark O'Meara withdrew with an elbow injury.
- Mark Calcavecchia (3) withdrew.

2. The Open Champions for 2004–2013

3. The Open Champions finishing in the first 10 and tying for 10th place in The Open Championship 2009–2013

- Tom Watson

4. First 10 and anyone tying for 10th place in the 2013 Open Championship

- Zach Johnson (5,13,15)
- Hunter Mahan (5,13,15)
- Hideki Matsuyama (5,15,20)
- Francesco Molinari (5,6)
- Ian Poulter (5,6)
- Adam Scott (5,10,13,15,17)
- Henrik Stenson (5,6,13)
- Lee Westwood (5,6)

5. The first 50 players on the Official World Golf Ranking (OWGR) for Week 21, 2014

- Thomas Bjørn (6)
- Jonas Blixt
- Keegan Bradley (11,13,15)
- Jason Day (13,15)
- Graham DeLaet (13,15)
- Luke Donald (7,13)
- Jamie Donaldson (6)
- Victor Dubuisson (6)
- Jason Dufner (11,13,15)
- Harris English
- Matt Every
- Rickie Fowler
- Jim Furyk (13)
- Stephen Gallacher (6)
- Sergio García (6,13)
- Bill Haas (13,15)
- Russell Henley
- Miguel Ángel Jiménez (6)
- Dustin Johnson (13)
- Matt Jones
- Martin Kaymer (6,9,11,12)
- Chris Kirk
- Matt Kuchar (12,13,15)
- Joost Luiten (6)
- Graeme McDowell (6,9)
- Rory McIlroy (7,9,11)
- Ryan Moore
- Ryan Palmer
- Patrick Reed
- Justin Rose (6,9,13)
- Charl Schwartzel (6,10,13,15)
- John Senden (Open Qualifying Series – Australia)
- Webb Simpson (9,13,15)
- Brandt Snedeker (13,15)
- Jordan Spieth (13,15)
- Jimmy Walker
- Bubba Watson (10)
- Gary Woodland (13)
- Steve Stricker (13,15) chose not to play.

6. First 30 in the Race to Dubai for 2013

- Grégory Bourdy
- Paul Casey
- Gonzalo Fernández-Castaño
- Tommy Fleetwood
- Branden Grace (15)
- David Howell
- Mikko Ilonen
- Thongchai Jaidee
- Matteo Manassero (7)
- Brett Rumford
- Richard Sterne (15)
- Peter Uihlein
- Bernd Wiesberger
- Chris Wood

7. The BMW PGA Championship winners for 2012–2014

8. First 5 European Tour members and any European Tour members tying for 5th place, not otherwise exempt, in the top 20 of the Race to Dubai on completion of the 2014 BMW International Open

- Rafa Cabrera-Bello
- Pablo Larrazábal
- Shane Lowry

9. The U.S. Open Champions for 2010–2014

10. The Masters Tournament Champions for 2010–2014

11. The PGA Champions for 2009–2013

- Yang Yong-eun

12. The Players Champions for 2012–2014

13. The leading 30 qualifiers for the 2013 Tour Championship

- Roberto Castro
- Brendon de Jonge (15)
- Billy Horschel
- D. A. Points
- Kevin Streelman
- Nick Watney
- Boo Weekley

14. First 5 PGA Tour members and any PGA Tour members tying for 5th place, not exempt in the top 20 of the PGA Tour FedEx Cup points list for 2014 on completion of the 2014 Travelers Championship

- Kevin Na
- Brendon Todd

15. Playing members of the 2013 Presidents Cup teams

- Ángel Cabrera
- Marc Leishman

16. First and anyone tying for 1st place on the Order of Merit of the Asian Tour for 2013

- Kiradech Aphibarnrat

17. First and anyone tying for 1st place on the Order of Merit of the PGA Tour of Australasia for 2013

18. First and anyone tying for 1st place on the Order of Merit of the Southern Africa PGA Sunshine Tour for 2013

- Dawie van der Walt

19. The Japan Open Champion for 2013

- Masanori Kobayashi

20. First 2 and anyone tying for 2nd place, not exempt, on the Official Money List of the Japan Golf Tour for 2013

- Kim Hyung-sung

21. First 2 and anyone tying for 2nd place, in a cumulative money list taken from all official 2014 Japan Golf Tour events up to and including the 2014 Japan Golf Tour Championship.

- Yūsaku Miyazato
- Koumei Oda

22. The Senior Open Champion for 2013

- Mark Wiebe

23. The Amateur Champion for 2014

- Bradley Neil (a)

24. The U.S. Amateur Champion for 2013

- Matt Fitzpatrick (26) forfeited his exemption by turning professional after the U.S. Open.

25. The European Amateur Champion for 2013

- Ashley Chesters (a)

26. The Mark H. McCormack Medal winner for 2013

=== Open Qualifying Series ===
Major changes were made to qualification routes. The Open Qualifying Series (OQS) was introduced, consisting of 10 events from the six major tours. This series largely replaced International Final Qualifying. Places were available to the leading players (not otherwise exempt) who finished in the top n and ties. In the event of ties, positions went to players according to their position in that week's Official World Golf Ranking.

Location	Tournament	Date	Spots	Top	Qualifiers
Australia	Emirates Australian Open	1 Dec	3	10	Rhein Gibson, Bryden Macpherson, John Senden
Africa	Joburg Open	9 Feb	3	10	George Coetzee, Jin Jeong, Justin Walters
Thailand	36-hole qualifier	7 Mar	4	n/a	Hiroshi Iwata, Pan Cheng-tsung (a), Yoshinobu Tsukada, Wu Ashun
Japan	Mizuno Open	1 Jun	4	12	Jang Dong-kyu, Kim Hyung-tae, Tomohiro Kondo, Juvic Pagunsan
Ireland	The Irish Open	22 Jun	3	10	Matthew Baldwin, Edoardo Molinari, Danny Willett
USA	Quicken Loans National	29 Jun	4	12	Charley Hoffman, Ben Martin, Brendan Steele, Shawn Stefani
France	Alstom Open de France	6 Jul	3	10	Michael Hoey, Robert Karlsson, Victor Riu
USA	Greenbrier Classic	6 Jul	4	12	Billy Hurley III, George McNeill, Chris Stroud, Cameron Tringale
Scotland	Scottish Open	13 Jul	3	10	Kristoffer Broberg, Tyrrell Hatton, Scott Jamieson
USA	John Deere Classic	13 Jul	1	5	Brian Harman

=== Final Qualifying ===
Unlike in previous years, when final qualifying had been held on courses close to the Open Championship venue, events were played at four courses covering Scotland and the North, Central and South regions of England.

Location	Qualifiers (Note: (a) – indicates the player was an amateur.) (Note: (R) – indicates a golfer who came through Regional Qualifying.)
Gailes Links	Paul McKechnie (R), Jamie McLeary, Marc Warren
Hillside	Oscar Florén, Chris Hanson, John Singleton (R)
Sunningdale (Note: Sunningdale replaced Royal Cinque Ports Golf Club after it received significant damage following winter storms.)	An Byeong-hun, Chris Rodgers, Matthew Southgate
Woburn	Paul Dunne (a), Rhys Enoch, Oliver Fisher

=== Alternates ===
To make up the full field of 156, additional places were allocated in ranking order from the Official World Golf Ranking at the time that these places were made available by the Championship Committee. Any places made available after the week 27 rankings issued on 6 July 2014 used these week 27 rankings.

From the Week 26 Official World Golf Ranking:

- Kevin Stadler (ranked 62)
- J. B. Holmes (63)
- K. J. Choi (66)
- Erik Compton (72)
- Brooks Koepka (74)
- Chesson Hadley (76)
- Freddie Jacobson (79)
- Anirban Lahiri (81)
- Scott Stallings (82)
- Thorbjørn Olesen (84) (Note: Olesen replaced Charles Howell III.)
- Charles Howell III (73) withdrew for family reasons.

From the Week 27 Official World Golf Ranking:

- Ryo Ishikawa (ranked 76) (Note: Ishikawa replaced Steve Stricker.)
- Ross Fisher (90) (Note: Fisher replaced Mark O'Meara.)
- David Hearn (94) (Note: Hearn replaced Mark Calcavecchia.)

== Round summaries ==
=== First round ===
Thursday, 17 July 2014

Rory McIlroy shot a bogey-free round of 66 (−6) to take a one-stroke lead over Matteo Manassero. World number one Adam Scott, Sergio García, brothers Edoardo and Francesco Molinari, Shane Lowry, Brooks Koepka and Jim Furyk were another shot further back at 68 (−4). Three-time champion Tiger Woods, playing in his first major championship of the year following back surgery, rebounded from bogeys on his first two holes to post a round of 69 (−3).

Place	Player	Score	To par
1	(Northern Ireland) Rory McIlroy	66	−6
2	(Italy) Matteo Manassero	67	−5
T3	(United States) Jim Furyk	68	−4
T3	(Spain) Sergio García	68	−4
T3	(United States) Brooks Koepka	68	−4
T3	(Republic of Ireland) Shane Lowry	68	−4
T3	(Italy) Edoardo Molinari	68	−4
T3	(Italy) Francesco Molinari	68	−4
T3	(Australia) Adam Scott	68	−4
T10	(United States) Rickie Fowler	69	−3
T10	(Sweden) Robert Karlsson	69	−3
T10	(Australia) Marc Leishman	69	−3
T10	(Japan) Hideki Matsuyama	69	−3
T10	(Japan) Koumei Oda	69	−3
T10	(Japan) Yoshinobu Tsukada	69	−3
T10	(United States) Jimmy Walker	69	−3
T10	(United States) Boo Weekley	69	−3
T10	(United States) Tiger Woods	69	−3

=== Second round ===
Friday, 18 July 2014

Rory McIlroy shot a second consecutive round of 66 (−6) to post a 132 total (−12) and a four-shot lead after 36 holes. Dustin Johnson had the lowest round of the tournament with a 65 (−7) to move into second place.

Place	Player	Score	To par
1	(Northern Ireland) Rory McIlroy	66-66=132	−12
2	(United States) Dustin Johnson	71-65=136	−8
T3	(United States) Rickie Fowler	69-69=138	−6
T3	(Spain) Sergio García	68-70=138	−6
T3	(Italy) Francesco Molinari	68-70=138	−6
T3	(United States) Ryan Moore	70-68=138	−6
T3	(South Africa) Louis Oosthuizen	70-68=138	−6
T3	(South Africa) Charl Schwartzel	71-67=138	−6
T9	(South Africa) George Coetzee	70-69=139	−5
T9	(United States) Jim Furyk	68-71=139	−5
T9	(Scotland) Marc Warren	71-68=139	−5

Amateurs: Chesters (+3), Dunne (+4), Pan (+4), Neil (+11).

=== Third round ===
Saturday, 19 July 2014

In anticipation of an approaching severe storm with lightning Saturday afternoon, the R&A announced Friday that the third round would be played off both the 1st and 10th tees in threesomes. Normal play is from only the first tee in pairs. This was the first time that play went off both tees at The Open.

Rickie Fowler, beginning the round six shots behind leader Rory McIlroy, recorded birdies on 7 of his first 12 holes to pull into a tie for the lead at 12-under. Still tied, Fowler made bogey on the 14th, while McIlroy made a 35-foot (11 m) putt for birdie and a two-shot swing which gave him the lead again. At the par-5 16th, Fowler made another bogey to drop into a tie for second with playing partner Sergio García. McIlroy then eagled the hole to take a 5-shot lead after the three-shot swing with Fowler. All three players bogeyed the 17th. At the par-5 18th, García made par and Fowler made birdie, but McIlroy hit his approach to 6 feet (1.8 m) and made another eagle, pushing his lead to six shots after 54 holes. McIlroy was the only person to eagle the 16th and 18th holes in the third round. Going into the closing round, McIlroy was within three shots of both the Open scoring record to par and the record score to par for all major championships, both of which are −19. The severe storms expected never materialized, although heavy showers preceded and followed third round play.

Place	Player	Score	To par
1	(Northern Ireland) Rory McIlroy	66-66-68=200	−16
2	(United States) Rickie Fowler	69-69-68=206	−10
T3	(Spain) Sergio García	68-70-69=207	−9
T3	(United States) Dustin Johnson	71-65-71=207	−9
5	(France) Victor Dubuisson	74-66-68=208	−8
6	(Italy) Edoardo Molinari	68-73-68=209	−7
T7	(United States) Jim Furyk	68-71-71=210	−6
T7	(Sweden) Robert Karlsson	69-71-70=210	−6
T7	(Italy) Matteo Manassero	67-75-68=210	−6
T7	(South Africa) Charl Schwartzel	71-67-72=210	−6
T7	(Australia) Adam Scott	68-73-69=210	−6

=== Final round ===
Sunday, 20 July 2014

Sergio García applied pressure on the leader Rory McIlroy early, making birdie at three of the first five holes. McIlroy responded with a birdie at the 1st hole, while playing partner Rickie Fowler missed a number of early opportunities for birdie. McIlroy made bogey at both the 5th and the 6th to drop his lead to 3 shots, and came back with a birdie at the 9th. García made an eagle at the 10th, besting McIlroy and Fowler who both made birdie. McIlroy made bogey at 13 to fall to −16 and his lead fell to two shots over García. However, García missed the green at the 15th in a greenside bunker and failed to escape the bunker on his first attempt. He made bogey and dropped into a tie with Fowler at −13. All three players made birdie at 16, and McIlroy missed the green at the 17th. His chip shot rolled to within a foot from the cup, securing par. Fowler and García both made birdie at the 18th. McIlroy made par for a two-shot victory. Jim Furyk finished fourth, as he did in 2006, also at Hoylake.

The low round of the day and the championship was 65 (−7), recorded by four players in placid conditions on Sunday.

==== Final leaderboard ====
Champion
(a) = amateur
(c) = past champion

Place	Player	Score	To par	Money (£)
1	(Northern Ireland) Rory McIlroy	66-66-68-71=271	−17	975,000
T2	(United States) Rickie Fowler	69-69-68-67=273	−15	460,000
T2	(Spain) Sergio García	68-70-69-66=273	−15	460,000
4	(United States) Jim Furyk	68-71-71-65=275	−13	280,000
T5	(Australia) Marc Leishman	69-72-70-65=276	−12	210,500
T5	(Australia) Adam Scott	68-73-69-66=276	−12	210,500
T7	(Italy) Edoardo Molinari	68-73-68-68=277	−11	154,250
T7	(South Africa) Charl Schwartzel	71-67-72-67=277	−11	154,250
T9	(France) Victor Dubuisson	74-66-68-70=278	−10	112,666
T9	(Republic of Ireland) Shane Lowry	68-75-70-65=278	−10	112,666
T9	(Northern Ireland) Graeme McDowell	74-69-68-67=278	−10	112,666

Leaderboard below the top 10
Place	Player	Score	To par	Money (£)
T12	(United States) Dustin Johnson	71-65-71-72=279	−9	84,667
T12	(Sweden) Robert Karlsson	69-71-70-69=279	−9	84,667
T12	(United States) Ryan Moore	70-68-73-68=279	−9	84,667
T15	(Scotland) Stephen Gallacher	70-72-70-68=280	−8	68,667
T15	(England) David Howell	72-70-70-68=280	−8	68,667
T15	(Italy) Francesco Molinari	68-70-75-67=280	−8	68,667
18	(South Africa) George Coetzee	70-69-74-68=281	−7	61,500
T19	(United States) Keegan Bradley	73-71-69-69=282	−6	55,000
T19	(Argentina) Ángel Cabrera	76-69-70-67=282	−6	55,000
T19	(United States) Chris Kirk	71-74-68-69=282	−6	55,000
T19	(Italy) Matteo Manassero	67-75-68-72=282	−6	55,000
T23	(United States) Phil Mickelson (c)	74-70-71-68=283	−5	46,167
T23	(England) Justin Rose	72-70-69-72=283	−5	46,167
T23	(England) Chris Wood	75-70-73-65=283	−5	46,167
T26	(South Korea) An Byeong-hun	72-71-69-72=284	−4	38,250
T26	(Denmark) Thomas Bjørn	70-71-76-67=284	−4	38,250
T26	(Northern Ireland) Darren Clarke (c)	72-72-67-73=284	−4	38,250
T26	(United States) Brian Harman	72-73-68-71=284	−4	38,250
T26	(United States) Ben Martin	71-73-70-70=284	−4	38,250
T26	(United States) Jimmy Walker	69-71-71-73=284	−4	38,250
T32	(Sweden) Kristoffer Broberg	70-73-70-72=285	−3	31,000
T32	(Canada) David Hearn	70-73-71-71=285	−3	31,000
T32	(United States) Hunter Mahan	71-73-72-69=285	−3	31,000
T32	(United States) D. A. Points	75-69-72-69=285	−3	31,000
T36	(South Africa) Branden Grace	71-72-69-74=286	−2	27,083
T36	(South Africa) Louis Oosthuizen (c)	70-68-76-72=286	−2	27,083
T36	(United States) Jordan Spieth	71-75-67-73=286	−2	27,083
T39	(Thailand) Thongchai Jaidee	72-72-72-71=287	−1	21,219
T39	(Japan) Hideki Matsuyama	69-74-73-71=287	−1	21,219
T39	(Japan) Koumei Oda	69-77-74-67=287	−1	21,219
T39	(United States) Kevin Stadler	73-72-71-71=287	−1	21,219
T39	(Sweden) Henrik Stenson	72-73-73-69=287	−1	21,219
T39	(United States) Brendon Todd	73-73-74-67=287	−1	21,219
T39	(Scotland) Marc Warren	71-68-72-76=287	−1	21,219
T39	(United States) Gary Woodland	75-69-72-71=287	−1	21,219
T47	(France) Grégory Bourdy	75-69-74-70=288	E	16,013
T47	(England) Paul Casey	74-71-73-70=288	E	16,013
T47	(United States) Stewart Cink (c)	71-75-73-69=288	E	16,013
T47	(United States) Zach Johnson	71-75-71-71=288	E	16,013
T51	(United States) Jason Dufner	70-74-74-71=289	+1	14,650
T51	(United States) Bill Haas	70-72-73-74=289	+1	14,650
T51	(United States) Tom Watson (c)	73-73-75-68=289	+1	14,650
T54	(Australia) Matt Jones	71-74-72-73=290	+2	13,925
T54	(United States) Matt Kuchar	73-71-74-72=290	+2	13,925
T54	(United States) Kevin Na	76-70-70-74=290	+2	13,925
T54	(United States) Kevin Streelman	72-74-69-75=290	+2	13,925
T58	(Australia) Jason Day	73-73-74-71=291	+3	13,350
T58	(Scotland) Jamie McLeary	73-73-75-70=291	+3	13,350
T58	(United States) Ryan Palmer	74-71-76-70=291	+3	13,350
T58	(England) Chris Rodgers	73-71-73-74=291	+3	13,350
T58	(Australia) John Senden	71-74-75-71=291	+3	13,350
T58	(United States) Brandt Snedeker	74-72-71-74=291	+3	13,350
T64	(England) Luke Donald	73-73-71-75=292	+4	12,900
T64	(United States) Billy Hurley III	73-72-76-71=292	+4	12,900
T64	(Denmark) Thorbjørn Olesen	75-71-73-73=292	+4	12,900
T67	(United States) Charley Hoffman	74-72-76-71=293	+5	12,650
T67	(United States) Brooks Koepka	68-77-74-74=293	+5	12,650
69	(United States) Tiger Woods (c)	69-77-73-75=294	+6	12,500
70	(Germany) Martin Kaymer	73-72-72-79=296	+8	12,400
71	(United States) Matt Every	75-71-73-78=297	+9	12,300
72	(Australia) Rhein Gibson	72-74-74-78=298	+10	12,200
CUT	(Thailand) Kiradech Aphibarnrat	72-75=147	+3	
CUT	(Spain) Rafa Cabrera-Bello	70-77=147	+3	
CUT	(England) Ashley Chesters (a)	70-77=147	+3	
CUT	(South Korea) K. J. Choi	72-75=147	+3	
CUT	(Canada) Graham DeLaet	71-76=147	+3	
CUT	(England) Oliver Fisher	72-75=147	+3	
CUT	(Sweden) Oscar Florén	73-74=147	+3	
CUT	(Japan) Hiroshi Iwata	70-77=147	+3	
CUT	(United States) Justin Leonard (c)	74-73=147	+3	
CUT	(Scotland) Paul McKechnie	76-71=147	+3	
CUT	(England) Ian Poulter	73-74=147	+3	
CUT	(United States) Shawn Stefani	73-74=147	+3	
CUT	(Japan) Yoshinobu Tsukada	69-78=147	+3	
CUT	(South Africa) Dawie van der Walt	71-76=147	+3	
CUT	(United States) Nick Watney	72-75=147	+3	
CUT	(England) Lee Westwood	71-76=147	+3	
CUT	(United States) Erik Compton	71-77=148	+4	
CUT	(United States) Ben Curtis (c)	74-74=148	+4	
CUT	(United States) John Daly (c)	77-71=148	+4	
CUT	(Zimbabwe) Brendon de Jonge	78-70=148	+4	
CUT	(Republic of Ireland) Paul Dunne (a)	75-73=148	+4	
CUT	(United States) Harris English	72-76=148	+4	
CUT	(England) Ross Fisher	74-74=148	+4	
CUT	(United States) Billy Horschel	73-75=148	+4	
CUT	(Finland) Mikko Ilonen	70-78=148	+4	
CUT	(Japan) Ryo Ishikawa	74-74=148	+4	
CUT	(Sweden) Freddie Jacobson	70-78=148	+4	
CUT	(Spain) Miguel Ángel Jiménez	75-73=148	+4	
CUT	(South Korea) Kim Hyung-sung	72-76=148	+4	
CUT	(South Korea) Kim Hyung-tae	75-73=148	+4	
CUT	(Taiwan) Pan Cheng-tsung (a)	74-74=148	+4	
CUT	(Australia) Brett Rumford	75-73=148	+4	
CUT	(England) John Singleton	78-70=148	+4	
CUT	(United States) Cameron Tringale	74-74=148	+4	
CUT	(United States) Bubba Watson	76-72=148	+4	
CUT	(United States) Boo Weekley	69-79=148	+4	
CUT	(England) Danny Willett	74-74=148	+4	
CUT	(Wales) Rhys Enoch	73-76=149	+5	
CUT	(United States) George McNeill	76-73=149	+5	
CUT	(Japan) Yūsaku Miyazato	72-77=149	+5	
CUT	(Philippines) Juvic Pagunsan	76-73=149	+5	
CUT	(United States) Patrick Reed	78-71=149	+5	
CUT	(United States) Scott Stallings	75-74=149	+5	
CUT	(England) Matthew Baldwin	76-74=150	+6	
CUT	(Sweden) Jonas Blixt	75-75=150	+6	
CUT	(Spain) Gonzalo Fernández-Castaño	74-76=150	+6	
CUT	(England) Tommy Fleetwood	74-76=150	+6	
CUT	(India) Anirban Lahiri	75-75=150	+6	
CUT	(Wales) Jamie Donaldson	79-72=151	+7	
CUT	(United States) Chesson Hadley	79-72=151	+7	
CUT	(United States) Todd Hamilton (c)	77-74=151	+7	
CUT	(United States) J. B. Holmes	74-77=151	+7	
CUT	(Japan) Masanori Kobayashi	78-73=151	+7	
CUT	(France) Victor Riu	74-77=151	+7	
CUT	(South Africa) Justin Walters	77-74=151	+7	
CUT	(Austria) Bernd Wiesberger	72-79=151	+7	
CUT	(China) Wu Ashun	75-76=151	+7	
CUT	(South Korea) Yang Yong-eun	75-76=151	+7	
CUT	(United States) David Duval (c)	73-79=152	+8	
CUT	(South Africa) Ernie Els (c)	79-73=152	+8	
CUT	(Republic of Ireland) Pádraig Harrington (c)	74-78=152	+8	
CUT	(England) Tyrrell Hatton	75-77=152	+8	
CUT	(Spain) Pablo Larrazábal	75-77=152	+8	
CUT	(South Africa) Richard Sterne	73-79=152	+8	
CUT	(England) Nick Faldo (c)	76-77=153	+9	
CUT	(Japan) Tomohiro Kondo	76-77=153	+9	
CUT	(United States) Webb Simpson	76-77=153	+9	
CUT	(Scotland) Scott Jamieson	77-77=154	+10	
CUT	(Scotland) Paul Lawrie (c)	79-75=154	+10	
CUT	(United States) Brendan Steele	74-80=154	+10	
CUT	(United States) Roberto Castro	74-81=155	+11	
CUT	(England) Chris Hanson	81-74=155	+11	
CUT	(United States) Russell Henley	75-80=155	+11	
CUT	(South Korea) Jin Jeong	77-78=155	+11	
CUT	(Scotland) Bradley Neil (a)	79-76=155	+11	
CUT	(England) Matthew Southgate	80-76=156	+12	
CUT	(United States) Chris Stroud	79-77=156	+12	
CUT	(United States) Peter Uihlein	77-79=156	+12	
CUT	(South Korea) Jang Dong-kyu	78-79=157	+13	
CUT	(Netherlands) Joost Luiten	81-76=157	+13	
CUT	(United States) Mark Wiebe	79-78=157	+13	
CUT	(Scotland) Sandy Lyle (c)	82-84=166	+22	
CUT	(Australia) Bryden Macpherson	90-80=170	+26	
WD	(Northern Ireland) Michael Hoey	75	+3	

==== Scorecard ====
Final round

Hole	1	2	3	4	5	6	7	8	9	10	11	12	13	14	15	16	17	18
Par	4	4	4	4	5	3	4	4	3	5	4	4	3	4	3	5	4	5
(Northern Ireland) McIlroy	−17	−17	−17	−17	−16	−15	−15	−15	−16	−17	−17	−17	−16	−16	−16	−17	−17	−17
(United States) Fowler	−10	−11	−11	−11	−11	−11	−11	−11	−11	−12	−12	−12	−12	−12	−13	−14	−14	−15
(Spain) García	−10	−10	−11	−11	−12	−12	−12	−12	−12	−14	−14	−14	−14	−14	−13	−14	−14	−15
(United States) Furyk	−6	−6	−6	−6	−8	−8	−8	−8	−8	−9	−10	−10	−10	−10	−11	−12	−12	−13
(Australia) Leishman	−5	−5	−5	−6	−7	−8	−8	−9	−8	−9	−9	−9	−9	−9	−10	−11	−11	−12
(Australia) Scott	−6	−7	−8	−8	−9	−9	−9	−7	−7	−8	−9	−9	−9	−10	−10	−11	−11	−12

Cumulative tournament scores, relative to par

Eagle	Birdie	Bogey	Double bogey
