= Jordan Niebrugge =

American professional golfer (born 1993)

Personal information
- Nationality: United States
- Born: August 4, 1993 (age 33) Bridgeton, Missouri, U.S.
- Height: 6 ft 4 in (1.93 m)
- Weight: 185 lb (84 kg; 13.2 st)

Career
- Sport: Golf
- College: Oklahoma State University
- Turned professional: 2016
- Current tour: Korn Ferry Tour
- Former tour: PGA Tour Canada
- Professional wins: 2

Best results in major championships
- Masters Tournament: CUT: 2014
- PGA Championship: DNP
- U.S. Open: T35: 2017
- The Open Championship: T6: 2015

Jordan Niebrugge (born August 4, 1993) is an American professional golfer.

== Early life ==
Niebrugge was born just outside St. Louis in Bridgeton, Missouri. When he was at a young age, his parents, Rod and Judy Niebrugge, moved with Jordan and his older sister Alyssa to Mequon, Wisconsin.

== Amateur career ==
Niebrugge attended Oklahoma State University–Stillwater from 2012 to 2016, where he achieved honorable mention All-American honors all four years. His senior year, he was named Big 12 men's golf Scholar-Athlete of the Year and was selected to receive first Everett Dobson Award by Oklahoma Golf Hall of Fame.

In the summer of 2013, Niebrugge won the Wisconsin Match Play Championship, then produced an amateur winning streak that consisted of victories at the U.S. Amateur Public Links Championship, Wisconsin State Amateur, and Western Amateur. Previous victories at the Wisconsin State Open and the WIAA High School Championship places Niebrugge and PGA Tour golfer Mark Wilson as the only golfers to win all four events of the "Wisconsin Slam".

Niebrugge was selected to play for the USA 2013 Walker Cup and 2015 Walker Cup teams where he posted wins in both singles matches. He was also chosen to represent USA in the 2013 Spirit International Amateur Golf Championship. Along with teammate Scottie Scheffler, the two combined to win the men's competition for Team USA as well as the overall combined team competition. He also tied for the overall individual lead.

With his win at the U.S. Amateur Public Links Championship, Niebrugge received an invitation to compete at the 2014 Masters Tournament in April 2014, where he played the first two rounds at +11 and missed the cut.

In 2015, Niebrugge finished tied for medalist honors at the Hillside qualifier which resulted in an invitation to the 2015 Open Championship at St Andrews, where he went on to win the silver medal for being low amateur and tied for 6th overall. Completing the tournament at 11-under-par with an overall 277 also earned him the lowest score by an amateur in the history of The Open Championship.

== Professional career ==
As a professional golfer, Niebrugge currently plays on Korn Ferry Tour and has competed in two major championships, The Open Championship and the U.S. Open (In 2014, he competed in the Masters Tournament as an amateur).

== Amateur wins ==
- 2010 W Duncan MacMillan Classic
- 2013 Wisconsin Match Play Championship, U.S. Amateur Public Links, Wisconsin State Amateur, Western Amateur
- 2014 The Amer Ari Invitational
- 2015 NCAA New Haven Regional

== Professional wins (2) ==
=== PGA Tour Canada wins (1) ===
No.	Date	Tournament	Winning score	Margin of victory	Runners-up
1	Jun 3, 2018	Freedom 55 Financial Open	−16 (66-68-66-72=272)	2 strokes	(United States) Cody Blick, (United States) Zach Wright

=== Other wins (1) ===
- 2011 Wisconsin State Open (as an amateur)

== Results in major championships ==
Tournament	2014	2015	2016	2017
Masters Tournament	CUT			
U.S. Open				T35
The Open Championship		T6LA	CUT	
PGA Championship				

Top 10
Did not play

LA = Low amateur
CUT = missed the half-way cut
"T" = tied for place

== Team appearances ==
Amateur

- Walker Cup (representing the United States): 2013 (winners), 2015
- The Spirit International Amateur Golf Championship (representing the United States): 2013 (winners)

Professional

- Aruba Cup (representing PGA Tour Canada): 2017 (winners)
