= Paul Dunne =

Irish professional golfer (born 1992)

Personal information
- Full name: Paul Colum Dunne
- Nationality: Ireland
- Born: 26 November 1992 (age 33) Dublin, Ireland
- Height: 5 ft 8 in (1.73 m)
- Weight: 160 lb (73 kg; 11 st)

Career
- Sport: Golf
- College: University of Alabama at Birmingham
- Turned professional: 2015
- Current tour: Challenge Tour
- Former tour: European Tour
- Professional wins: 2
- Highest ranking: 65 (29 April 2018)

Number of wins by tour
- European Tour: 1
- Other: 1

Best results in major championships
- Masters Tournament: DNP
- PGA Championship: CUT: 2018
- U.S. Open: CUT: 2017
- The Open Championship: T30: 2015

Paul Colum Dunne (born 26 November 1992) is an Irish professional golfer from Greystones in County Wicklow. He first came to prominence at the 2015 Open Championship where, playing as an amateur, he was tied for the lead after three rounds. In 2017 he had his first European Tour win, the British Masters.

== Amateur career ==
Dunne attended Blackrock College, a secondary school for boys. He won the 2010 Irish Youths Amateur title; the following year, he finished third.

Dunne played college golf at University of Alabama at Birmingham. As a junior, he was named the 2014 Conference USA Golfer of the Year. As a senior, Dunne finished fifth in the individual competition at the 2015 NCAA Division I Men's Golf Championship. As a senior in college he was the Blazers' top golfer with a scoring average of 71.9.

Dunne qualified for the 2014 Open Championship through final qualifying at Woburn. He scored 75 and 73 and missed the cut by two shots. He also played in the 2014 Palmer Cup.

Dunne finished his amateur career after representing Great Britain and Ireland in their 16.5 to 9.5 victory over the United States at Royal Lytham & St Annes Golf Club in the Walker Cup. He contributed 1.5 out of a possible 4 points over the two-day tournament.

=== 2015 Open Championship ===
Dunne qualified for the 2015 Open Championship by winning the Final Qualifier at Woburn; it was the second straight year he had won it. Scoring 69 in each of the first two rounds at St Andrews, he made the cut and was the leading amateur at that stage. In the third round, he scored 66 to become joint leader at 12-under-par. He was the first amateur since 1927 to lead the Open Championship after 54 holes, and he also set a tournament record for lowest 54-hole score by an amateur. On the final day he was in the last pairing with Louis Oosthuizen. He shot a 78 in the final round to drop to a tie for 30th place.

== Professional career ==
Dunne turned professional later in 2015. His first event as a professional golfer was the Alfred Dunhill Links Championship. In November 2015, he gained a Category 17 European Tour membership by finishing 16th at the European Tour Qualifying School. He then went on to finish in 106th position, in the 2016 Race to Dubai series and earn Category 11 European Tour membership for the European Tour in 2017.

In April 2017, Dunne lost in a sudden-death playoff to Edoardo Molinari at the Trophée Hassan II. He missed an eight-foot par putt on the first extra hole to allow Molinari to win the event with a par. In October he had his first European Tour win, taking the British Masters by three strokes from Rory McIlroy, after a final round 61. Dunne's victory was the 51st title won by a player from the Republic of Ireland on the European Tour.

== Personal life ==
Dunne was born in Dublin, Ireland, to Colum and Michelle Dunne. He has two older siblings, Alison and David.

Dunne graduated with a degree in business finance from the University of Alabama at Birmingham.

== Amateur wins ==
- 2009 Irish Boys Close
- 2010 Irish Youths Amateur Close
- 2013 East of Ireland Open Championship, Georgetown Intercollegiate
- 2014 Samford Intercollegiate

== Professional wins (2) ==
=== European Tour wins (1) ===
No.	Date	Tournament	Winning score	Margin of victory	Runner-up
1	1 Oct 2017	British Masters	−20 (66-68-65-61=260)	3 strokes	(Northern Ireland) Rory McIlroy

European Tour playoff record (0–1)

No.	Year	Tournament	Opponents	Result
1	2017	Trophée Hassan II	(Italy) Edoardo Molinari	Lost to par on first extra hole

=== Other wins (1) ===
No.	Date	Tournament	Winning score	Margin of victory	Runners-up
1	6 May 2017	GolfSixes (with (Republic of Ireland) Gavin Moynihan)	2–0		France − Mike Lorenzo-Vera and Romain Wattel

== Results in major championships ==
Tournament	2014	2015	2016	2017	2018
Masters Tournament					
U.S. Open				CUT	
The Open Championship	CUT	T30	CUT		T67
PGA Championship					CUT

Did not play

CUT = missed the half-way cut
"T" = tied

== Results in World Golf Championships ==
Tournament	2017	2018
Championship		T55
Match Play		
Invitational		T66
Champions	T38	

Did not play

"T" = tied

== Team appearances ==
Amateur

- European Boys' Team Championship (representing Ireland): 2008, 2009
- Jacques Léglise Trophy (representing Great Britain & Ireland): 2009 (captain, winners), 2010
- European Amateur Team Championship (representing Ireland): 2010, 2011, 2013, 2014, 2015
- Palmer Cup (representing Great Britain & Ireland): 2014 (winners)
- St Andrews Trophy (representing Great Britain & Ireland): 2014 (winners)
- Eisenhower Trophy (representing Ireland): 2014
- Walker Cup (representing Great Britain & Ireland): 2015 (winners)

Professional

- EurAsia Cup (representing Europe): 2018 (winners)
- World Cup (representing Ireland): 2018

== See also ==
- 2015 European Tour Qualifying School graduates
