= Marc Leishman =

Australian professional golfer (born 1983)

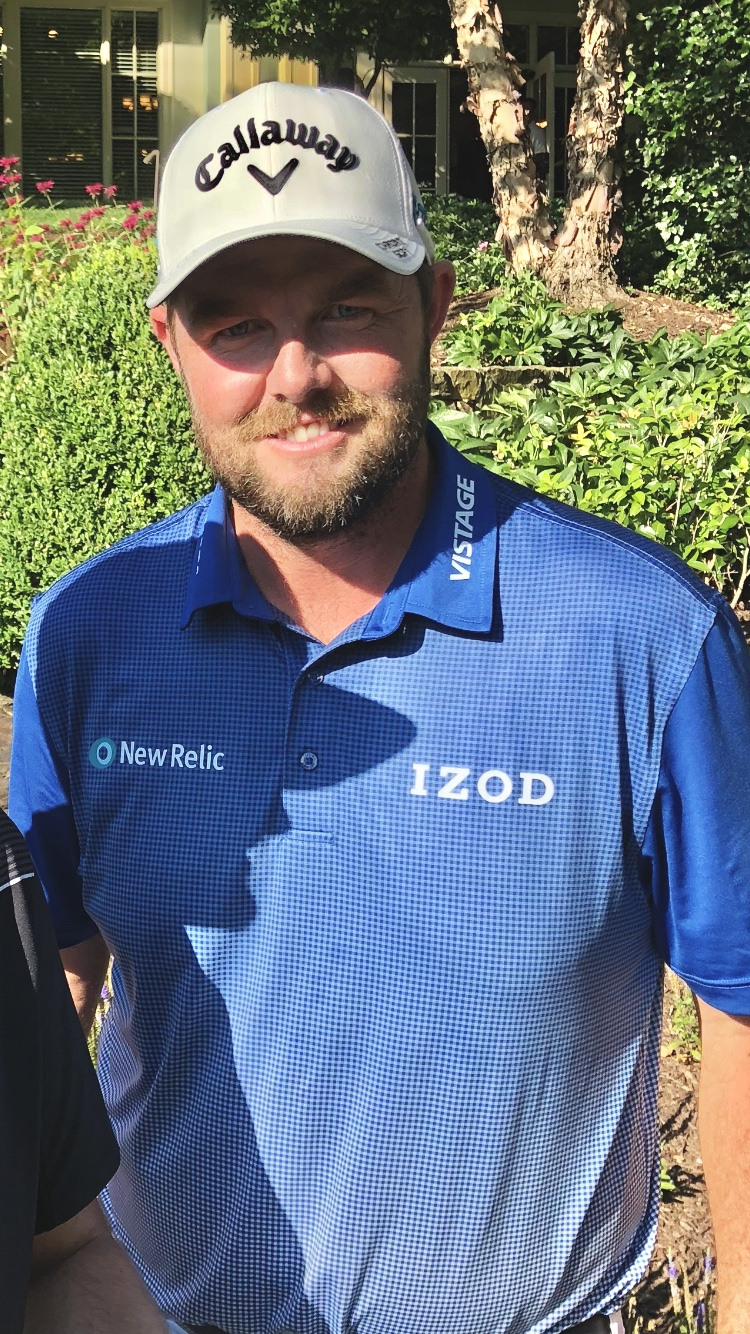
- Leishman at the 2018 Quicken Loans National

Personal information
- Full name: Marc A. Leishman
- Nationality: Australia
- Born: 24 October 1983 (age 43) Warrnambool, Victoria, Australia
- Height: 6 ft 2 in (1.88 m)
- Weight: 200 lb (91 kg)
- Spouse: Audrey Hills (m. 2010)
- Children: 3

Career
- Sport: Golf
- Turned professional: 2005
- Current tours: PGA Tour of Australasia; LIV Golf
- Former tour: PGA Tour
- Professional wins: 15
- Highest ranking: 12 (22 October 2017) (as of 8 November 2026)

Number of wins by tour
- PGA Tour: 6
- European Tour: 1
- Asian Tour: 1
- Sunshine Tour: 1
- PGA Tour of Australasia: 1
- Korn Ferry Tour: 1
- LIV Golf: 1
- Other: 5

Best results in major championships
- Masters Tournament: T4: 2013
- PGA Championship: T12: 2013
- U.S. Open: T14: 2022
- The Open Championship: T2: 2015

Achievements and awards
- Von Nida Tour Order of Merit winner: 2006
- PGA Tour Rookie of the Year: 2009
- Greg Norman Medal: 2017

Marc A. Leishman (born 24 October 1983) is an Australian professional golfer. He has won six times on the PGA Tour. In 2009 he won the Rookie of the Year award on the PGA Tour, the first Australian to win the award.

== Early years and amateur career ==
Leishman was born in Warrnambool, Victoria. He had a very successful amateur career in Australia, winning many junior tournaments. He won the Warrnambool Club Championship as a 13-year-old while playing in the same group as his father. In 2001 he won the Victorian Junior Masters, the South Australian Junior Masters and was the Victorian Boys champion.

== Professional career ==
He turned professional in 2005. He played on the Von Nida Tour in 2006, winning two tournaments and topping the order of merit. In 2007, he played his rookie season on the Nationwide Tour finishing 92nd on the money list. He won his maiden title on the Nationwide Tour in 2008 at the WNB Golf Classic by a record-equaling (with Chris Smith) eleven shots. He finished the year 19th on the money list to earn his PGA Tour card for the 2009 season.

Leishman was voted the Rookie of the Year in 2009 after recording three top-10 finishes, which included a runner-up finish behind Tiger Woods at the BMW Championship, the third of the four FedEx Cup playoff events. Leishman subsequently qualified for the season ending Tour Championship. He ended the year 53rd on the money list. He recorded his second runner-up finish of his PGA Tour career at the Farmers Insurance Open in 2010. He finished inside the top 100 on the money list in both 2010 and 2011. He reached the BMW Championship in both seasons.

Leishman won his first tournament after 96 starts on the PGA Tour in June 2012 at the Travelers Championship, coming from six strokes back of the 54 hole leaders to win by a stroke. He shot a final round of 62, which included eight birdies and no bogeys to match his career best round and second best comeback in the tournament's history. He became the second Australian to win the event after Greg Norman in 1995.

At the 2013 Masters Tournament, Leishman was the co-leader after the opening round, alongside Sergio García, as he shot a six under total of 66. He maintained his challenge over the second and third rounds to go into the final day two strokes behind the leaders. He finished T-4 with Tiger Woods, four shots off the lead.

In July 2015, in The Open Championship at St Andrews, Leishman finished as joint runner-up after losing in a four-hole aggregate playoff during a Monday finish to the delayed tournament. After coming close to missing the cut after the first two rounds, Leishman shot a 64 during the third round and a 66 in the final round to finish in a tie for first place with Zach Johnson and Louis Oosthuizen. Leishman did have the sole lead of the Championship with six holes to go during the final round but bogeyed the 16th hole to drop back to 15-under-par and an eventual tie. In the resulting four-hole playoff, after finding a divot with his tee shot at the first hole, this led to a bogey while Johnson and Oosthuizen opened with birdies to open up a two-stroke gap over Leishman. A further bogey at the third hole left him three strokes behind on the final hole and out of contention but his tie for second place gave him his best performance in a major to date.

On 19 March 2017, Leishman won his second PGA Tour event, the Arnold Palmer Invitational. On 17 September 2017, he claimed his third PGA Tour event, the BMW Championship with a tournament record −23. On 14 October 2018, Leishman shot a 7-under 65 in the final round to win the CIMB Classic by five strokes and equal Justin Thomas' tournament record of 26-under-par in 2015 on the TPC Kuala Lumpur West course.

In December 2019, Leishman played on the International team at the 2019 Presidents Cup at Royal Melbourne Golf Club in Australia. The U.S. team won 16–14. Leishman went 1–2–2 and halved his Sunday singles match against Rickie Fowler.

In January 2020, Leishman won the Farmers Insurance Open for his fifth PGA Tour title. Leishman shot a final round 65 to come from behind and defeat Jon Rahm by one stroke.

In April 2021, Leishman won the Zurich Classic of New Orleans. He was partnered with countryman Cameron Smith. The duo won in a playoff over Louis Oosthuizen and Charl Schwartzel. Leishman competed at the Tokyo 2020 Olympics, held in July/August 2021, in the men's competition, finishing 51st.

In August 2022, it was announced that Leishman had joined LIV Golf. He joined the all Australian Punch GC team, captained by Cameron Smith, which was renamed Ripper GC for the start of the following season. Leishman earned his first victory on the LIV Golf League in April 2025 at LIV Golf Miami, with a one-shot win over Charl Schwartzel.

== Personal life ==
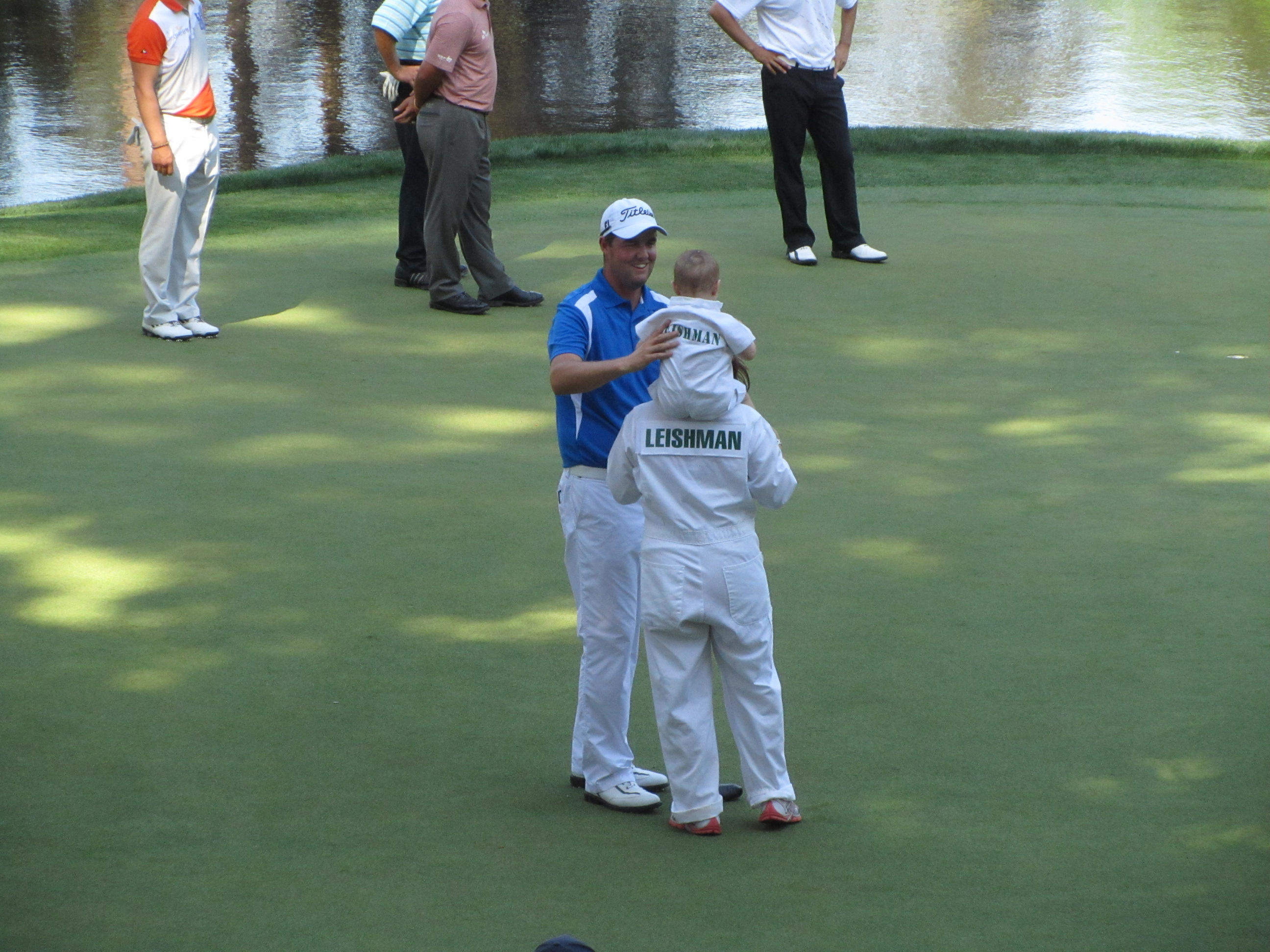
Leishman with his family at the 2013 Masters Tournament.

Leishman is married to Audrey and they have three children. They live in Virginia Beach, Virginia, USA.

On 31 March 2015, Audrey admitted herself to hospital suffering from acute respiratory distress syndrome. Leishman returned from preparations for the 2015 Masters Tournament to be with her. She was put in an induced coma, and toxic shock began to affect her organs. She was given a 5% chance of recovery. In mid-April, she had recovered enough to return home, and Leishman resumed the Tour in New Orleans. He and his wife created the Begin Again Foundation which aids families who need assistance with medical expenses.

== Amateur wins ==
- 2001 Victorian Junior Masters, Victorian Boys Championship, South Australian Junior Masters.
- 2005 Lake Macquarie Amateur.

== Professional wins (15) ==
=== PGA Tour wins (6) ===
Legend
FedEx Cup playoff events (1)
Other PGA Tour (5)

No.	Date	Tournament	Winning score	Margin of victory	Runner(s)-up
1	24 Jun 2012	Travelers Championship	−14 (68-66-70-62=266)	1 stroke	(United States) Charley Hoffman, (United States) Bubba Watson
2	19 Mar 2017	Arnold Palmer Invitational	−11 (71-66-71-69=277)	1 stroke	(United States) Charley Hoffman, (United States) Kevin Kisner
3	17 Sep 2017	BMW Championship	−23 (62-64-68-67=261)	5 strokes	(United States) Rickie Fowler, (England) Justin Rose
4	14 Oct 2018	CIMB Classic^{1}	−26 (68-62-67-65=262)	5 strokes	(United States) Bronson Burgoon, (Argentina) Emiliano Grillo, (United States) Chesson Hadley
5	26 Jan 2020	Farmers Insurance Open	−15 (68-72-68-65=273)	1 stroke	(Spain) Jon Rahm
6	25 Apr 2021	Zurich Classic of New Orleans (with (Australia) Cameron Smith)	−20 (63-72-63-70=268)	Playoff	(South Africa) Louis Oosthuizen and (South Africa) Charl Schwartzel

^{1}Co-sanctioned by the Asian Tour

PGA Tour playoff record (1–2)

No.	Year	Tournament	Opponent(s)	Result
1	2015	The Open Championship	(United States) Zach Johnson, (South Africa) Louis Oosthuizen	Johnson won four-hole aggregate playoff; Johnson: −1 (3-3-5-4=15), Oosthuizen: E (3-4-5-4=16), Leishman: +2 (5-4-5-4=18)
2	2017	CJ Cup	(United States) Justin Thomas	Lost to birdie on second extra hole
3	2021	Zurich Classic of New Orleans (with (Australia) Cameron Smith)	(South Africa) Louis Oosthuizen and (South Africa) Charl Schwartzel	Won with par on first extra hole

=== European Tour wins (1) ===
No.	Date	Tournament	Winning score	Margin of victory	Runner-up
1	6 Dec 2015 (2016 season)	Nedbank Golf Challenge^{1}	−19 (68-68-66-67=269)	6 strokes	(Sweden) Henrik Stenson

^{1}Co-sanctioned by the Sunshine Tour

European Tour playoff record (0–1)

No.	Year	Tournament	Opponents	Result
1	2015	The Open Championship	(United States) Zach Johnson, (South Africa) Louis Oosthuizen	Johnson won four-hole aggregate playoff; Johnson: −1 (3-3-5-4=15), Oosthuizen: E (3-4-5-4=16), Leishman: +2 (5-4-5-4=18)

=== PGA Tour of Australasia wins (1) ===
No.	Date	Tournament	Winning score	Margin of victory	Runner-up
1	14 Dec 2025	Victorian PGA Championship	−5 (71-67-68-76=282)	1 stroke	(Australia) Josh Younger

=== Nationwide Tour wins (1) ===
No.	Date	Tournament	Winning score	Margin of victory	Runner-up
1	12 Oct 2008	WNB Golf Classic	−21 (67-66-66-68=267)	11 strokes	(United States) Keoke Cotner

=== Korean Tour wins (1) ===
No.	Date	Tournament	Winning score	Margin of victory	Runners-up
1	21 May 2006	SBS Jisan Resort Open	−18 (61-69-70-70=270)	10 strokes	(South Korea) Kang Kyung-nam, (South Korea) Lee Seong-ho

=== Von Nida Tour wins (4) ===
No.	Date	Tournament	Winning score	Margin of victory	Runner(s)-up
1	19 Mar 2006	Toyota Southern Classic	−20 (60-64-66=190)	7 strokes	(Sweden) Jens Nilsson
2	15 Oct 2006	North QLD X-Ray Services Cairns Classic	−5 (78-68-70-67=283)	1 stroke	(Australia) Michael Brennan
3	25 Mar 2007	Toyota Southern Classic (2)	−11 (69-65-68-67=269)	1 stroke	(Australia) Andrew Bonhomme
4	3 Feb 2008	NAB Victorian PGA Championship	−19 (67-68-69-65=269)	1 stroke	(Australia) Kurt Barnes, (Australia) Cameron Percy

=== LIV Golf League wins (1) ===
No.	Date	Tournament	Winning score	Margin of victory	Runner-up
1	6 Apr 2025	LIV Golf Miami	−6 (71-71-68=210)	1 stroke	(South Africa) Charl Schwartzel

== Results in major championships ==
Results not in chronological order in 2020.

Tournament	2010	2011	2012	2013	2014	2015	2016	2017	2018
Masters Tournament	CUT			T4	CUT		CUT	T43	9
U.S. Open	CUT	T51		CUT		CUT	T18	T27	T45
The Open Championship	T60		CUT	CUT	T5	T2	T53	T6	60
PGA Championship	T48		T27	T12	T46	CUT	T60	T13	T71

Tournament	2019	2020	2021	2022	2023	2024	2025
Masters Tournament	T49	T13	T5	T30			
PGA Championship	CUT	CUT	CUT	T34			
U.S. Open	T35	CUT	64	T14			T38
The Open Championship	CUT	NT	CUT	CUT			T52

Top 10
Did not play

CUT = missed the half-way cut
"T" = tied
NT = no tournament due to COVID-19 pandemic

=== Summary ===
Tournament	Wins	2nd	3rd	Top-5	Top-10	Top-25	Events	Cuts made
Masters Tournament	0	0	0	2	3	4	10	7
PGA Championship	0	0	0	0	0	2	12	8
U.S. Open	0	0	0	0	0	2	13	8
The Open Championship	0	1	0	2	3	3	11	7
Totals	0	1	0	4	6	11	46	30

- Most consecutive cuts made – 12 (2016 U.S. Open – 2019 Masters)
- Longest streak of top-10s – 1 (six times)

== Results in The Players Championship ==
Tournament	2010	2011	2012	2013	2014	2015	2016	2017	2018	2019
The Players Championship	CUT	CUT	45	T8	T23	T24	T64	CUT	T63	CUT

Tournament	2020	2021	2022
The Players Championship	C	CUT	CUT

Top 10

CUT = missed the halfway cut
"T" indicates a tie for a place
C = Cancelled after the first round due to the COVID-19 pandemic

== Results in World Golf Championships ==
Results not in chronological order before 2015.

Tournament	2010	2011	2012	2013	2014	2015	2016	2017	2018	2019	2020	2021	2022
Championship	T63						T28		T37	T62	T42	T39	
Match Play					R64	R16	T51	R16	T52	R16	NT^{1}	T28	T35
Invitational			T45		3	T33	55	T41	T14	3	T52	T36	
Champions					9	T11		T38			NT^{1}	NT^{1}	NT^{1}

^{1}Cancelled due to COVID-19 pandemic

Top 10
Did not play

QF, R16, R32, R64 = Round in which player lost in match play
NT = No tournament
"T" = Tied
Note that the Championship and Invitational were discontinued from 2022.

== Team appearances ==
Amateur

- Australian Men's Interstate Teams Matches (representing Victoria): 2003 (winners), 2004

Professional

- Presidents Cup (representing the International team): 2013, 2015, 2017, 2019
- World Cup (representing Australia): 2016, 2018

== Recognition ==
- 2017 – Greg Norman Medal

== See also ==
- 2008 Nationwide Tour graduates
