= English Open =

Professional golf tournament

Tournament information
- Location: Pershore, Worcestershire, England
- Established: 1988
- Course: The Vale Golf Club
- Par: 72
- Length: 7,109 yards (6,500 m)
- Tours: European Tour; Challenge Tour
- Format: Stroke play
- Prize fund: £300,000
- Month played: June

Tournament record score
- Aggregate: 268 Darren Clarke (1999)
- To par: −20 as above

Current champion
- (United States) John Catlin

Final champion
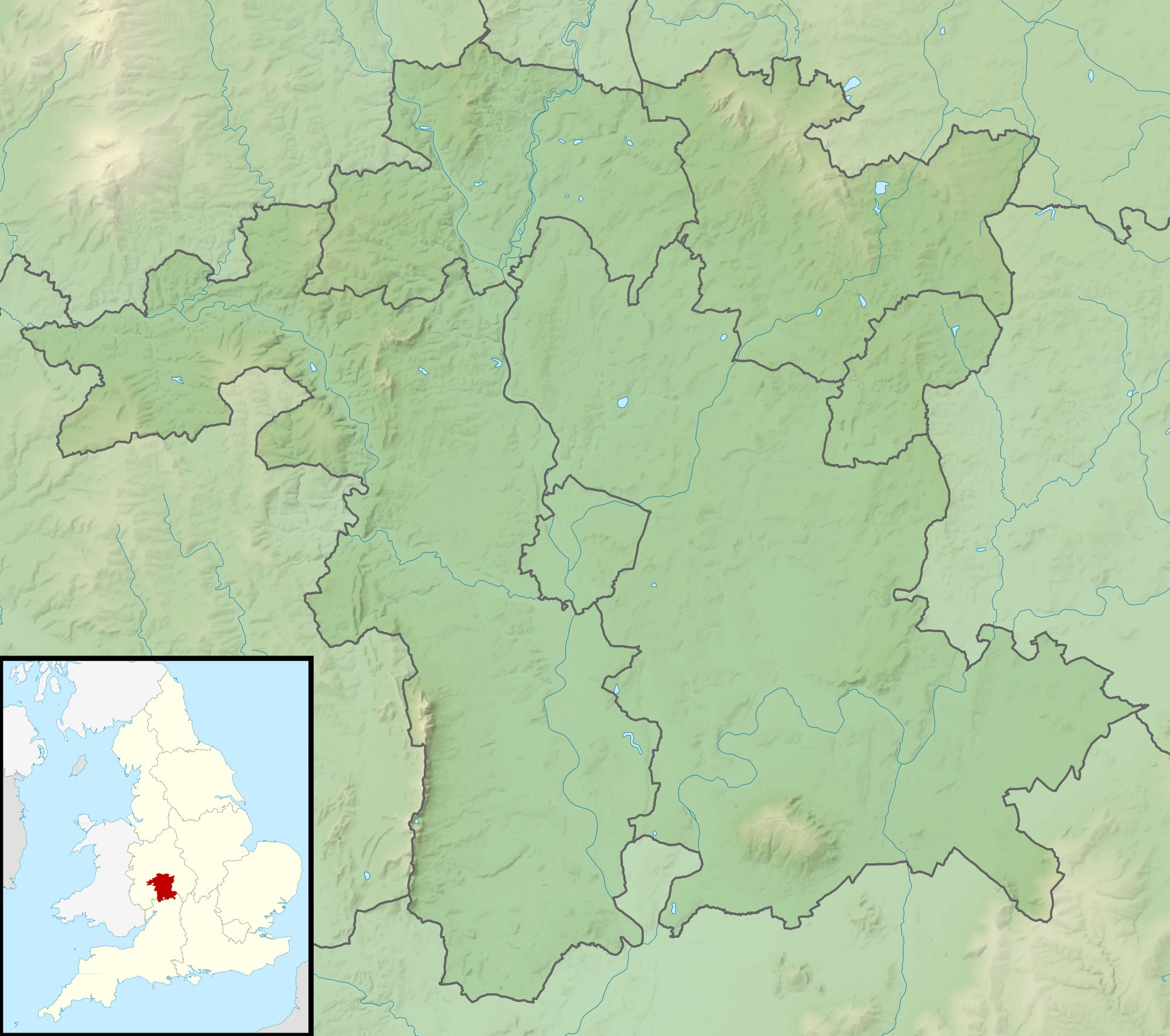
- Location in England Location in Worcestershire

The English Open is a professional golf tournament held in England. First played in 1988, it was an annual event on the European Tour until 2002. After several aborted attempts at reviving the tournament, it returned to the tour schedule in 2021, when it was titled as the Cazoo Classic.

Winners of the tournament include some of the most successful players in European Tour history including Mark James, Ian Woosnam, Colin Montgomerie, Lee Westwood and Darren Clarke. James and Clarke are the only two players to have won the title more than once.

== History ==
The English Open was founded in 1988, replacing the Lawrence Batley International on the tour schedule, and despite initial sponsorship issues, there were hopes that the new English Open would develop into another major national open on the circuit.

After the first event, which was held at Royal Birkdale, the Brabazon course at The Belfry was home to the tournament until 1993, when it moved to the Forest of Arden. It was then played at Hanbury Manor between 1997 and 1999, before returning to the Forest of Arden until the tournament was cancelled following the 2002 season as part of long-term plans for the European Tour to expand globally, by reducing the number of tournaments held in Europe, especially the United Kingdom. In the tour's first official season in 1972 12 out of 20 events were staged in the UK; by 1988 the ratio was 11 to 15, but by 2005 this was down to 8 out of 47.

After a six-year hiatus the English Open was due to return to the European Tour schedule in 2009. A five-year deal with the tour had been agreed, with the tournament being played over the Jack Nicklaus designed Signature Course at the St. Mellion International Resort in Cornwall, initially an alternate event to the PGA Championship, one of professional golf's majors. However early in 2009, due to the impact of the Great Recession, the revival was postponed until 2011 at the earliest. In March 2011 it was announced that the event had been cancelled due to insufficient sponsorship revenue having been raised by the organisers.

The tournament was due to return in 2020 as part of a revamp of the European Tour's schedule in the wake of the COVID-19 pandemic. The event was played at Forest of Arden Hotel and Country Club as part of a 6-week "UK Swing". When Hero MotoCorp agreed to sponsor of the scheduled event in July 2020, it was renamed as the Hero Open, and later separated historically from the English Open.

The English Open did return in 2021, however a sponsorship agreement with Cazoo saw the tournament renamed as the Cazoo Classic. Cazoo's multi-year partnership with the tour also included title sponsorship of the Wales Open.

In May 2026, it was announced by the Challenge Tour that the English Open would be resurrected as part of the 2026 Challenge Tour schedule. This announcement saw the tournament confirmed for 2026 and 2027, as well as being scheduled to be included on the European Tour in 2028.

== Winners ==
Year	Tour (Note: CHA − Challenge Tour; EUR − European Tour.)	Winner	Score	To par	Margin of victory	Runner(s)-up	Venue
English Open
2026	CHA	(United States) John Catlin	270	−18	Playoff	(Norway) Kristian Krogh Johannessen	The Vale
2023–2025: No tournament
Cazoo Classic
2022	EUR	(Scotland) Richie Ramsay	274	−14	1 stroke	(England) Paul Waring	Hillside
2021	EUR	(Scotland) Calum Hill	272	−16	1 stroke	(France) Alexander Lévy	London
English Open
2010–2020: No tournament
2009	EUR	Cancelled due to lack of funding					
2003–2008: No tournament
Compass Group English Open
2002	EUR	(Northern Ireland) Darren Clarke (3)	271	−17	3 strokes	(Denmark) Søren Hansen	Forest of Arden
2001	EUR	(Australia) Peter O'Malley	275	−13	1 stroke	(France) Raphaël Jacquelin	Forest of Arden
2000	EUR	(Northern Ireland) Darren Clarke (2)	275	−13	1 stroke	(New Zealand) Michael Campbell (England) Mark James	Forest of Arden
1999	EUR	(Northern Ireland) Darren Clarke	268	−20	2 strokes	(England) John Bickerton	Hanbury Manor
National Car Rental English Open
1998	EUR	(England) Lee Westwood	271	−17	2 strokes	(Australia) Greg Chalmers (Sweden) Olle Karlsson	Hanbury Manor
Alamo English Open
1997	EUR	(Sweden) Per-Ulrik Johansson	269	−19	2 strokes	(Sweden) Dennis Edlund	Hanbury Manor
1996	EUR	(Australia) Robert Allenby	278	−10	1 stroke	(England) Ross McFarlane (Scotland) Colin Montgomerie	Forest of Arden
Murphy's English Open
1995	EUR	(Republic of Ireland) Philip Walton	274	−14	Playoff	(Scotland) Colin Montgomerie	Forest of Arden
1994	EUR	(Scotland) Colin Montgomerie	274	−14	1 stroke	(England) Barry Lane	Forest of Arden
1993	EUR	(Wales) Ian Woosnam	269	−19	2 strokes	(Italy) Costantino Rocca	The Belfry
1992	EUR	(Argentina) Vicente Fernández	283	−5	1 stroke	(Sweden) Per-Ulrik Johansson (Sweden) Fredrik Lindgren	The Belfry
NM English Open
1991	EUR	(England) David Gilford	278	−10	2 strokes	(England) Roger Chapman	The Belfry
1990	EUR	(England) Mark James (2)	284	−4	Playoff	(Scotland) Sam Torrance	The Belfry
1989	EUR	(England) Mark James	279	−9	1 stroke	(Republic of Ireland) Eamonn Darcy (Australia) Craig Parry (Scotland) Sam Torrance	The Belfry
English Open
1988	EUR	(England) Howard Clark	279	−9	3 strokes	(England) Peter Baker	Royal Birkdale

== See also ==
- Open golf tournament
- English Classic
- Hero Open
