= Hero Open =

Golf tournament in Scotland

Coordinates: 56.320°N 2.731°W

Tournament information
- Location: St Andrews, Fife, Scotland
- Established: 2020
- Courses: Fairmont St Andrews (Torrance Course)
- Par: 72
- Length: 7,230 yards (6,610 m)
- Tour: European Tour
- Format: Stroke play
- Prize fund: €1,750,000
- Month played: July
- Final year: 2022

Tournament record score
- Aggregate: 264 Grant Forrest (2021)
- To par: −24 as above

Final champion
- (United States) Sean Crocker

Location map
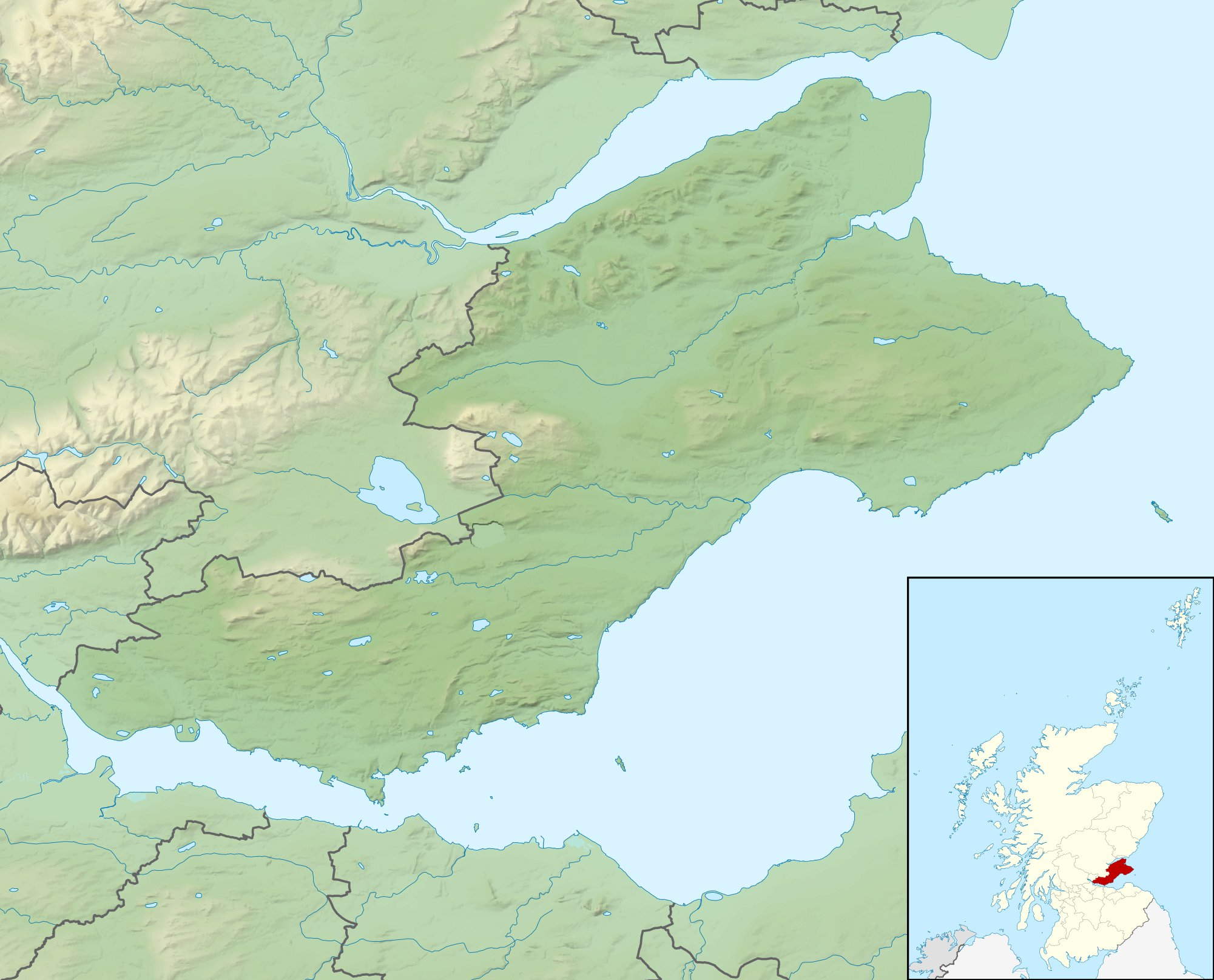
- Location in Scotland Location in Fife

The Hero Open was a professional golf tournament played on the European Tour. The event was created as part of the tour's overhaul in response to the COVID-19 pandemic in 2020. It was originally planned as a revival of the English Open, but after Hero MotoCorp agreed sponsorship of the event in July 2020, the event was effectively separated.

== History ==
The inaugural tournament was held at Forest of Arden in Warwickshire, England. Sam Horsfield took the title, winning by one shot ahead of Thomas Detry. The event returned in 2021, when it was held at Fairmont St Andrews, in Fife, Scotland. Grant Forrest won by one shot ahead of James Morrison.

== Winners ==
Year	Winner	Score	To par	Margin of victory	Runner-up	Venue
2022	(United States) Sean Crocker	266	−22	1 stroke	(England) Eddie Pepperell	Fairmont St Andrews
2021	(Scotland) Grant Forrest	264	−24	1 stroke	(England) James Morrison	Fairmont St Andrews
2020	(England) Sam Horsfield	270	−18	1 stroke	(Belgium) Thomas Detry	Forest of Arden
