= 2004 European Tour =

Golf tour season

2004 European Tour season
- Duration: 4 December 2003 – 31 October 2004
- Number of official events: 45
- Most wins: (Spain) Miguel Ángel Jiménez (4)
- Order of Merit: (South Africa) Ernie Els
- Golfer of the Year: (Fiji) Vijay Singh
- Sir Henry Cotton Rookie of the Year: (Scotland) Scott Drummond

The 2004 European Tour was the 33rd season of the European Tour, the main professional golf tour in Europe since its inaugural season in 1972.

== Changes for 2004 ==
Changes from 2003 included two new tournaments, the Open de Sevilla and The Heritage, and the loss of the Benson & Hedges International Open, the Trophée Lancôme and the Nordic Open. The HSBC World Match Play Championship also became an official money-list event for the first time with an increased field determined by qualification criteria, which also meant it regained Official World Golf Ranking status, and the Mallorca Classic became a full European Tour event having been a dual-ranking event in 2003.

== Schedule ==
The following table lists official events during the 2004 season.

| Date | Tournament | Host country | Purse | Winner (Note: The number in brackets after each winner's name is the number of European Tour events they had won up to and including that tournament. This information is only shown for European Tour members and are inclusive of the three United States-based major championships which were included on the schedule for the first time in 1998, with earlier editions having retrospectively been recognised as official tour wins.) | OWGR points | Other tours (Note: AFR − Sunshine Tour; ANZ − PGA Tour of Australasia; ASA − Asian Tour; CHA − Challenge Tour.) | Notes |
|---|---|---|---|---|---|---|---|
| 7 Dec | Omega Hong Kong Open | Hong Kong | US$700,000 | (Republic of Ireland) Pádraig Harrington (8) | 26 | ASA | |
| 18 Jan | South African Airways Open | South Africa | £500,000 | (South Africa) Trevor Immelman (2) | 32 | AFR (Note: Sunshine Tour flagship event) | |
| 25 Jan | Dunhill Championship | South Africa | £500,000 | (Germany) Marcel Siem (1) | 18 | AFR | |
| 1 Feb | Johnnie Walker Classic | Thailand | £1,000,000 | (Spain) Miguel Ángel Jiménez (8) | 38 | ANZ, ASA | |
| 8 Feb | Heineken Classic | Australia | A$2,000,000 | (South Africa) Ernie Els (16) | 34 | ANZ | |
| 15 Feb | ANZ Championship | Australia | A$1,750,000 | (England) Brian Davis (2) | 20 | ANZ | |
| 22 Feb | Carlsberg Malaysian Open | Malaysia | US$1,210,000 | (Thailand) Thongchai Jaidee (1) | 16 | ASA | |
| 29 Feb | WGC-Accenture Match Play Championship | United States | US$7,000,000 | (United States) Tiger Woods (n/a) | 74 | | World Golf Championship |
| 7 Mar | Dubai Desert Classic | UAE | US$2,000,000 | (United States) Mark O'Meara (n/a) | 46 | | |
| 14 Mar | Qatar Masters | Qatar | US$1,500,000 | (Sweden) Joakim Haeggman (3) | 24 | | |
| 21 Mar | Caltex Singapore Masters | Singapore | US$900,000 | (Scotland) Colin Montgomerie (28) | 16 | ASA | |
| 28 Mar | Madeira Island Open | Portugal | €600,000 | (Sweden) Chris Hanell (1) | 24 | CHA | |
| 4 Apr | Algarve Open de Portugal | Portugal | €1,250,000 | (Spain) Miguel Ángel Jiménez (9) | 24 | | |
| 11 Apr | Masters Tournament | United States | US$6,000,000 | (United States) Phil Mickelson (n/a) | 100 | | Major championship |
| 18 Apr | Open de Sevilla | Spain | €1,000,000 | (Argentina) Ricardo González (3) | 24 | | New tournament |
| 25 Apr | Canarias Open de España | Spain | €1,650,000 | (France) Christian Cévaër (1) | 24 | | |
| 3 May | Telecom Italia Open | Italy | €1,200,000 | (Northern Ireland) Graeme McDowell (2) | 24 | | |
| 9 May | Daily Telegraph Damovo British Masters | England | £1,600,000 | (England) Barry Lane (5) | 30 | | |
| 16 May | BMW Asian Open | China | US$1,500,000 | (Spain) Miguel Ángel Jiménez (10) | 18 | ASA | |
| 23 May | Deutsche Bank - SAP Open TPC of Europe | Germany | €3,000,000 | (South Africa) Trevor Immelman (3) | 48 | | |
| 30 May | Volvo PGA Championship | England | €3,750,000 | (Scotland) Scott Drummond (1) | 64 | | Flagship event |
| 6 Jun | Celtic Manor Wales Open | Wales | £1,500,000 | (England) Simon Khan (1) | 24 | | |
| 13 Jun | Diageo Championship at Gleneagles | Scotland | £1,400,000 | (England) Miles Tunnicliff (2) | 24 | | |
| 20 Jun | Aa St Omer Open | France | €400,000 | (France) Philippe Lima (1) | 16 | CHA | |
| 20 Jun | U.S. Open | United States | US$6,250,000 | (South Africa) Retief Goosen (10) | 100 | | Major championship |
| 27 Jun | Open de France | France | €3,000,000 | (France) Jean-François Remésy (2) | 24 | | |
| 4 Jul | Smurfit European Open | Ireland | £2,400,000 | (South Africa) Retief Goosen (11) | 40 | | |
| 11 Jul | Barclays Scottish Open | Scotland | £2,200,000 | (France) Thomas Levet (3) | 48 | | |
| 18 Jul | The Open Championship | Scotland | £4,000,000 | (United States) Todd Hamilton (n/a) | 100 | | Major championship |
| 25 Jul | Nissan Irish Open | Ireland | €1,900,000 | (Australia) Brett Rumford (2) | 26 | | |
| 1 Aug | Scandinavian Masters | Sweden | €1,600,000 | (England) Luke Donald (1) | 24 | | |
| 8 Aug | KLM Open | Netherlands | €1,200,000 | (England) David Lynn (1) | 24 | | |
| 15 Aug | BMW Russian Open | Russia | US$500,000 | (England) Gary Emerson (1) | 16 | CHA | |
| 15 Aug | PGA Championship | United States | US$6,250,000 | (Fiji) Vijay Singh (12) | 100 | | Major championship |
| 22 Aug | WGC-NEC Invitational | United States | US$7,000,000 | (United States) Stewart Cink (1) | 76 | | World Golf Championship |
| 29 Aug | BMW International Open | Germany | €1,800,000 | (Spain) Miguel Ángel Jiménez (11) | 44 | | |
| 5 Sep | Omega European Masters | Switzerland | €1,600,000 | (England) Luke Donald (2) | 30 | | |
| 12 Sep | Linde German Masters | Germany | €3,000,000 | (Republic of Ireland) Pádraig Harrington (9) | 42 | | |
| 26 Sep | The Heritage | England | €2,000,000 | (Sweden) Henrik Stenson (2) | 28 | | New tournament |
| 3 Oct | WGC-American Express Championship | Ireland | US$7,000,000 | (South Africa) Ernie Els (17) | 70 | | World Golf Championship |
| 10 Oct | Dunhill Links Championship | Scotland | US$5,000,000 | (Scotland) Stephen Gallacher (1) | 54 | | Pro-Am |
| 17 Oct | HSBC World Match Play Championship | England | £1,660,000 | (South Africa) Ernie Els (18) | 48 | | Upgraded to official event Limited-field event |
| 17 Oct | Mallorca Classic | Spain | €1,000,000 | (Spain) Sergio García (5) | 24 | | |
| 24 Oct | Open de Madrid | Spain | €1,000,000 | (South Africa) Richard Sterne (1) | 24 | | |
| 31 Oct | Volvo Masters Andalucía | Spain | €3,750,000 | (England) Ian Poulter (6) | 44 | | Tour Championship |

=== Unofficial events ===
The following events were sanctioned by the European Tour, but did not carry official money, nor were wins official.

| Date | Tournament | Host country | Purse | Winners | OWGR points | Notes |
|---|---|---|---|---|---|---|
| 19 Sep | Ryder Cup | United States | n/a | Team Europe | n/a | Team event |
| 21 Nov | WGC-World Cup | Spain | US$4,000,000 | (England) Paul Casey and (England) Luke Donald | n/a | World Golf Championship; Team event |

== Order of Merit ==
The Order of Merit was titled as the Volvo Order of Merit and was based on prize money won during the season, calculated in Euros.

| Position | Player | Prize money (€) |
|---|---|---|
| 1 | (South Africa) Ernie Els | 4,061,905 |
| 2 | (South Africa) Retief Goosen | 2,325,202 |
| 3 | (Republic of Ireland) Pádraig Harrington | 1,910,394 |
| 4 | (Spain) Miguel Ángel Jiménez | 1,886,237 |
| 5 | (France) Thomas Levet | 1,727,945 |
| 6 | (Northern Ireland) Graeme McDowell | 1,648,862 |
| 7 | (England) Lee Westwood | 1,592,766 |
| 8 | (Northern Ireland) Darren Clarke | 1,563,803 |
| 9 | (England) Ian Poulter | 1,533,158 |
| 10 | (England) David Howell | 1,501,502 |

== Awards ==
| Award | Winner | Ref. |
|---|---|---|
| Golfer of the Year | (Fiji) Vijay Singh | |
| Sir Henry Cotton Rookie of the Year | (Scotland) Scott Drummond | |

== See also ==
- 2004 in golf
- 2004 European Seniors Tour
