= The Belfry =

English golf resort and hotel

Coordinates: 52.55434°N 1.73447°W

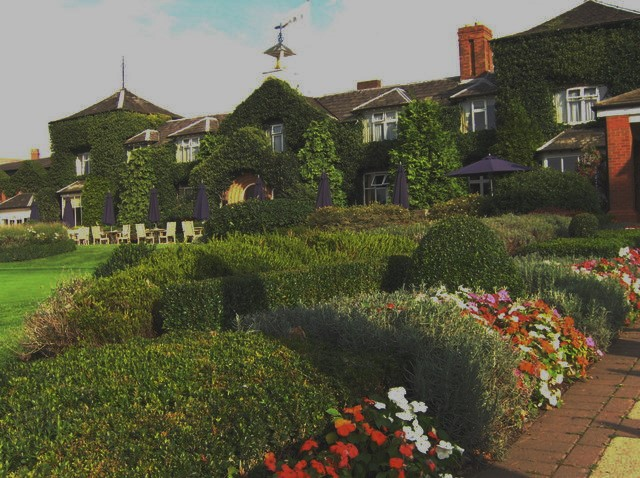
- Interactive map of The Belfry

Club information
- Location: Wishaw, Warwickshire, England
- Type: Private
- Owner: Cedar Capital Partner, Goldman Sachs
- Tota holes: 54
- Tournaments: Ryder Cup, British Masters, Benson & Hedges International Open, English Open, English Classic, UK Championship
- Website: thebelfry.co.uk

Brabazon Course
- Designed by: Dave Thomas, Peter Alliss
- Par: 72
- Length: 7,253
- Course record: 63, Martin Erlandsson

PGA National Course
- Designed by: Dave Thomas
- Par: 72
- Length: 7,053

Derby Course
- Designed by: Dave Thomas, Peter Alliss
- Par: 70
- Length: 6,099

The Belfry Hotel and Resort
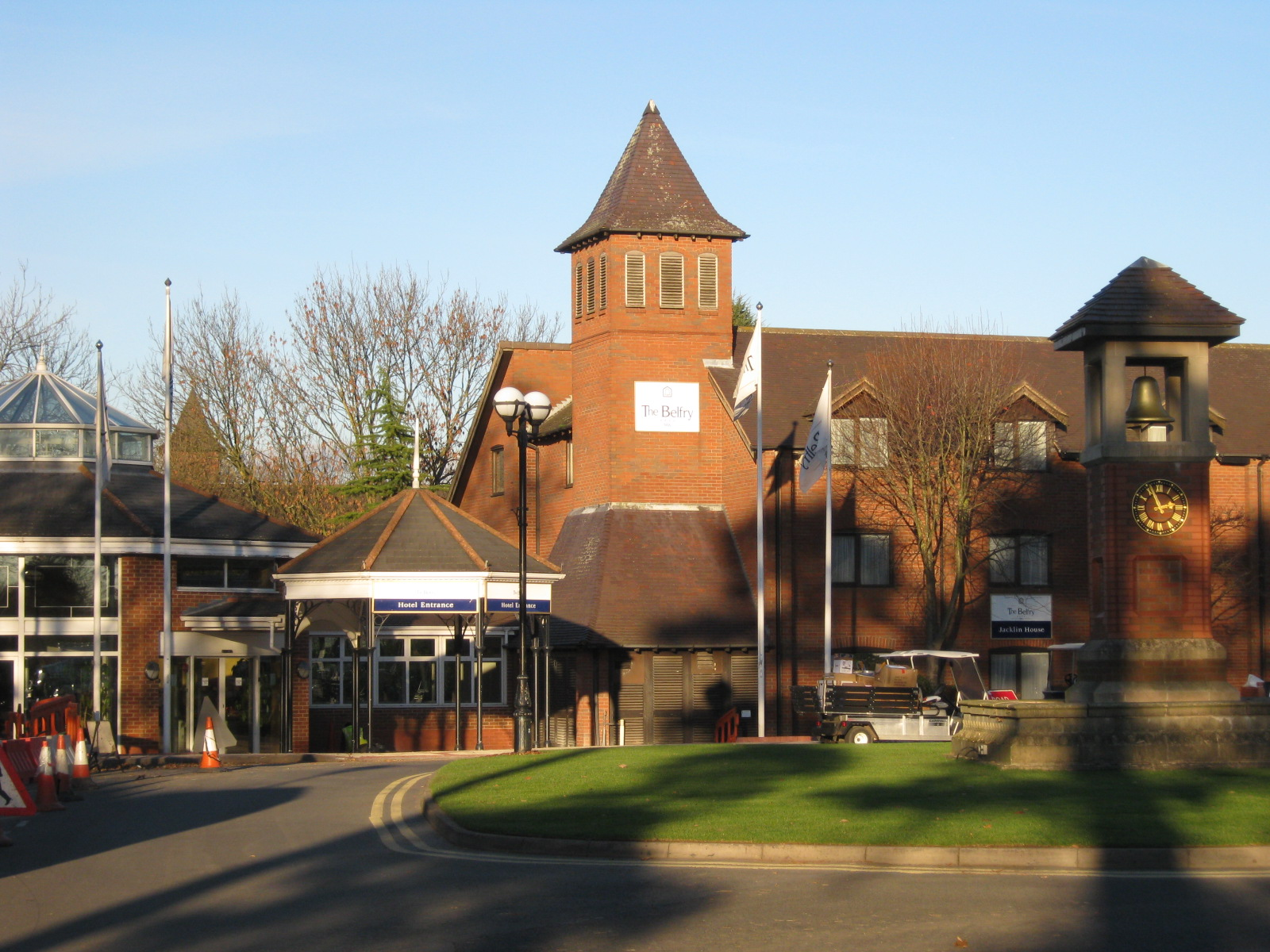
- Interactive map of the The Belfry Hotel and Resort area

General information
- Location: Wishaw, Warwickshire; Sutton Coldfield, England; B76 9PR
- Owner: KSL Capital Partners

Other information
- Number of restaurants: 4

Website
- thebelfry.co.uk

The Belfry is a golf resort and hotel in Wishaw, Warwickshire, close to Sutton Coldfield, England, located approximately 8 miles from the centre of Birmingham. It was acquired by KSL Capital Partners in August 2012.

The resort has three golf courses. The Brabazon Course is the main tournament course, and the others are the PGA National and The Derby. The headquarters of The Professional Golfers' Association are also located there, along with a 4-star hotel, tennis courts and a leisure spa.

The Belfry has hosted the Ryder Cup four times and has staged more than twenty European Tour events.

In 2013, The Belfry underwent a comprehensive £26 million renovation of all bedrooms, meeting rooms, public spaces and other amenities. There was also a general uplift on the whole grounds appearance, including a new lobby entrance. The hotel remained open during the renovations and they were successfully completed. Further work has since been undertaken to improve other areas of the resort, including the spa. Sam's Bar, named after Scottish golfer and 2002 Ryder Cup Captain Sam Torrance, was also refurbished and renamed to Sam's Club House.

In 2024, work started on an £80 million expansion and renovation project at The Belfry involving the creation of additional rooms, a new leisure club and events space. The Masters Suite will also be created as part of the development. The project is due to be completed in autumn 2025 and the redevelopment has been on the agenda since Goldman Sachs Asset Management and Cedar Capital Partners bought the resort in 2021.

== Awards ==
The Belfry has won a number of awards including:

- World's Best Golf Hotel - 4 consecutive wins 2018 - 2021
- England's Leading Golf Resort in 2004, 2011 and 2015
- England's Leading Resort - 10 consecutive wins 2015 - 2024
- England's Leading Conference Hotel - 5 consecutive wins 2017- 2021
- England's Leading Meetings & Conference Hotel - 3 consecutive wins 2022 - 2024

== Ryder Cup ==
The Belfry has hosted the Ryder Cup four times, which is more than any other venue in the world.

Year	Winner	Score	
2002	Europe	15½	12½
1993	United States	15	13
1989	Europe; Tie; Europe retains Cup	14	14
1985	Europe	16½	11½

== European Tour ==
Year	Tournament	Winner
2024	Betfred British Masters	(Denmark) Niklas Nørgaard
2023	Betfred British Masters	(New Zealand) Daniel Hillier
2022	Betfred British Masters	(Denmark) Thorbjørn Olesen
2021	Betfred British Masters	(England) Richard Bland
2020	ISPS Handa UK Championship	(Denmark) Rasmus Højgaard
2008	Quinn Insurance British Masters	(Spain) Gonzalo Fernández-Castaño
2007	Quinn Direct British Masters	(England) Lee Westwood
2006	Quinn Direct British Masters	(Sweden) Johan Edfors
2003	Benson & Hedges International Open	(England) Paul Casey
2002	Benson & Hedges International Open	(Argentina) Ángel Cabrera
2001	Benson & Hedges International Open	(Sweden) Henrik Stenson
2000	Benson & Hedges International Open	(Spain) José María Olazábal
1992	Murphy's English Open	(Argentina) Vicente Fernández
1991	NM English Open	(England) David Gilford
1990	NM English Open	(England) Mark James
1989	NM English Open	(England) Mark James
1983	State Express Classic	(South Africa) Hugh Baiocchi
1982	State Express English Classic	(Australia) Greg Norman
1981	State Express Classic	(Australia) Rodger Davis
1980	Mazda Cars English Classic	(Spain) Manuel Piñero
1979	Lada English Golf Classic	(Spain) Seve Ballesteros
