= English Open (disambiguation) =

The English Open was a professional golf tournament on the European Tour from 1988 to 2002.

English Open may also refer to:

- Brabazon Trophy, contested for in the English Men's Open Amateur Stroke Play Championship
- English Open (snooker)
- English Open (table tennis)

== See also ==
- English Opening, a chess opening that begins with the move 1. c4
