= Sean Crocker =

American professional golfer (born 1996)

Personal information
- Nationality: United States
- Born: August 31, 1996 (age 30) Harare, Zimbabwe
- Height: 5 ft 11 in (1.80 m)

Career
- Sport: Golf
- College: University of Southern California
- Turned professional: 2017
- Current tour: European Tour
- Former tours: Korn Ferry Tour; Challenge Tour
- Professional wins: 1

Number of wins by tour
- European Tour: 1

Best results in major championships
- Masters Tournament: DNP
- PGA Championship: DNP
- U.S. Open: CUT: 2022
- The Open Championship: T47: 2018

Sean Crocker (born August 31, 1996) is an American professional golfer who plays on the European Tour.

== Early life and amateur career ==
Crocker was born in Harare, Zimbabwe. His father, Gary, was a test cricketer, who played for Zimbabwe from 1992 to 1993. They moved from Zimbabwe to California when Crocker was five due to political issues. He played collegiate golf for the University of Southern California, after transitioning from baseball to golf at the age of thirteen. In 2014, Crocker was co-medalist in the U.S. Junior Amateur and was a quarter finalist in the match play portion of the same tournament. In 2015, Crocker reached the semifinals of the U.S. Amateur, but lost to the overall winner, Bryson DeChambeau. Crocker was also a two-time All-American (2015 and 2017).

== Professional career ==
Crocker turned professional in September 2017. After finishing in a joint 6th place in the 2018 SMBC Singapore Open, he earned an invite to his first major, the 2018 Open Championship. During this tournament, Crocker made the cut. At one stage, he was on the leaderboard in 6th place halfway through the third round and ultimately finished tied for 47th after a tough last round in windy conditions.

The following week he had his best finish as a professional, tied for third in the Euram Bank Open on the Challenge Tour. He followed that up with a T3 at the Kazakhstan Open (with a course record 62), 3rd at the Hainan Open, 3rd at the Foshan Open and 5th at the Ras Al Khaimah Challenge Tour Grand Final (tied course record 63), to finish in the top-15 ranked players (11th) and secured his 2019 European Tour card in his rookie year as a professional. He needed just 11 starts in the season to secure his 2019 playing rights.

In July 2022, Crocker won his first European Tour event at the Hero Open in Fairmont St Andrews, Scotland. He won wire-to-wire to beat Eddie Pepperell by one shot.

== Amateur wins ==
- 2013 Stockton Convention and Visitors Bureau Junior Open
- 2016 Monroe Invitational
- 2017 Italian International Amateur Championship, Chapman Grand Slam

== Professional wins (1) ==
=== European Tour wins (1) ===
No.	Date	Tournament	Winning score	Margin of victory	Runner-up
1	Jul 31, 2022	Hero Open	−22 (63-66-69-68=266)	1 stroke	(England) Eddie Pepperell

== Results in major championships ==
Results not in chronological before 2019 and 2020.

Tournament	2018	2019	2020	2021	2022	2023	2024
Masters Tournament							
PGA Championship							
U.S. Open					CUT		
The Open Championship	T47		NT				T50

Did not play

CUT = missed the half-way cut
"T" = tied
NT = no tournament due to the COVID-19 pandemic

== U.S. national team appearances ==
Amateur

- Arnold Palmer Cup: 2017 (winners)

== See also ==
- 2018 Challenge Tour graduates
