= 2004 HSBC World Match Play Championship =

41st HSBC World Match Play Championship

Coordinates: 51°23′48″N 0°35′45″W

Tournament information
- Dates: 14–17 October 2004
- Location: Virginia Water, Surrey, England
- Course(s): Wentworth Club
- Tour(s): European Tour
- Format: Match play – 36 holes

Statistics
- Par: 72
- Length: 7,073 yards (6,468 m)
- Field: 16 players
- Prize fund: £1,660,000
- Winner's share: £1,000,000

Champion
- (South Africa) Ernie Els
- def. Lee Westwood 2 & 1

The 2004 HSBC World Match Play Championship was the 41st HSBC World Match Play Championship played and the 1st time played as an official European Tour event. It was played from 14–17 October at the Wentworth Club. The champion received €1,443,830 (£1,000,000 or $2,042,513.20) making it the biggest first prize in golf at the time. Each match was played over 36 holes. Ernie Els defeated Lee Westwood 2 and 1 in the final to win the tournament for the sixth time, (his first official HSBC World Match Play Championship victory on the European Tour).

== Course ==
Front nine	1	2	3	4	5	6	7	8	9	Out
Yardage	474	154	447	496	191	354	396	400	452	3,364
Par	4	3	4	5	3	4	4	4	4	35

Back nine	10	11	12	13	14	15	16	17	18	In
Yardage	184	404	509	467	179	481	383	571	531	3,709
Par	3	4	5	4	3	4	4	5	5	37

	Front 9	Back 9	Total
Yardage	3,364	3,709	7,073
Par	35	37	72

== Bracket ==
First round 14 October
1	(South Africa) Ernie Els	2&1
16	(Scotland) Scott Drummond
8	(South Korea) K. J. Choi
9	(Argentina) Ángel Cabrera	1 up
5	(Republic of Ireland) Pádraig Harrington	2&1
12	(United States) Chris Riley
4	(Canada) Mike Weir
13	(France) Thomas Levet	2&1
6	(South Africa) Retief Goosen	12&11
11	(United States) Jeff Maggert
3	(United States) Todd Hamilton
14	(England) Lee Westwood	4&3
7	(Spain) Miguel Ángel Jiménez	3&2
10	(United States) Steve Flesch
2	(Fiji) Vijay Singh
15	(Germany) Bernhard Langer	37h

Quarterfinals; 15 October
1	(South Africa) Ernie Els	1up
9	(Argentina) Ángel Cabrera
5	(Republic of Ireland) Pádraig Harrington	1up
13	(France) Thomas Levet
6	(South Africa) Retief Goosen
14	(England) Lee Westwood	2&1
10	(Spain) Miguel Ángel Jiménez
15	(Germany) Bernhard Langer	2&1

Semifinals; 16 October
1	(South Africa) Ernie Els
5	(Republic of Ireland) Pádraig Harrington	5&4
14	(England) Lee Westwood	1up
10	(Spain) Miguel Ángel Jiménez

Championship; 17 October
1	(South Africa) Ernie Els	2&1
14	(England) Lee Westwood

== Prize money breakdown ==
=== Actual prize fund ===
Place	Euro (€)	Pounds (£)	US ($)
Champion	1,443,830	1,000,000	2,042,513
Runner-Up	577,532	400,000	817,005
Losing Semi Finalist x 2	173,259	120,000	245,101
Losing Quarter Finalists x 4	115,506	80,000	163,400
Losing First Round x 8	86,629	60,000	122,55
Total	€2,396,756	£1,660,000	$3,390,569

=== Breakdown for European Tour Order of Merit ===
Place	Euro (€)	Pounds (£)	US ($)
Champion	597,884	406,660	830,607
Runner-Up	398,594	271,110	553,745
Losing Semi Finalist x 2	201,968	120,000	280,583
Losing Quarter Finalists x 4	118,742	80,000	164,961
Losing First Round x 8	61,972	42,151	86,093
Total	€1,379,120	£938,014.17	$1,915,988

- Source for $US Dollar conversions
