= Hanbury Manor Marriott Hotel and Country Club =

House in Hertfordshire, UK

Coordinates: 51°49′44″N 0°02′26″W

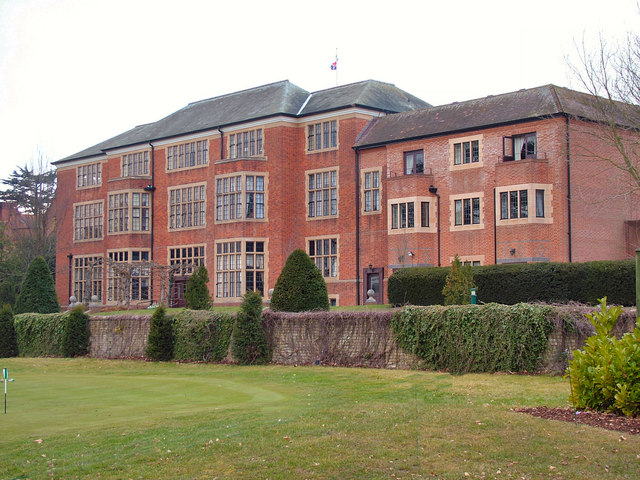
Hanbury Manor

Hanbury Manor is a converted late-Victorian country house operated by Marriott Hotels as part of the Hanbury Manor Marriott Hotel & Country Club with an adjoining golf course in Thundridge, north of Ware, Hertfordshire, 10 miles (16 km) north of Greater London. The house is Grade II* listed on the National Heritage List for England.

== History ==
=== Grant of land to Reginald Pole (1500-1558) ===
A purported manor here derives from ownership of a grand house approximately on the site of the current house in the 16th century. A manor is a leading family estate typically with farmland and other manorial rights across a wider area. The longstanding mention of the estate as 'Poles' derives from the erection of a major house (and possible subinfeudation of some of the Church Manor's rights rather than inheritance of a medieval manor) to Reginald Pole, a cardinal before Henry VIII's English Reformation. His mother The Blessèd Margaret Pole, 8th Countess of Salisbury was the last legitimate Plantagenet based on strict patrilineality. He served two years as the last catholic Archbishop of Canterbury and died 12 hours after Queen Mary I of England.

=== Sampson Hanbury (1769–1835) ===
During the final years of the 18th century the Hanbury family chose to settle here (first becoming lessees) and later purchasers. This branch of the Hanbury family had Norman noble ancestry; forebear Geoffrey De Hanbury (a Norman first name) settled in Worcestershire in the 14th century. Sampson Hanbury bought Poles outright about the year 1800. From 1799 to 1830 he was Master of the Puckeridge Hounds. Childless, he left Poles to his widow, Agatha.

=== Robert Hanbury (1798–1884) ===
Robert Hanbury was senior partner in the Truman, Hanbury, Buxton & Co major brewery in East London. He inherited Poles on the death of his aunt Agatha in 1847. He was a magistrate and Deputy Lieutenant, and in 1854 became the High Sheriff of Hertfordshire. His son, also Robert Hanbury (a.k.a. Robert Culling Hanbury after second marriage) (1823–1867) died before inheriting. He was a partner in the brewery and from 1857 to 1867 was one of the two MPs for Middlesex.

=== Edmund Smith Hanbury (1850–1913) ===
Edmund Hanbury was a partner in the brewery from 1873, from which he retired in 1886. On his grandfather's death he brought his family to live at Poles, a property which, at that time, was in excess of 2,000 acres (8.1 km^{2}). His wife, Amy, found the house to be a rambling, uninhabitable monstrosity and refused to live in it.

Architects Sir Ernest George and Harold Peto designed a replacement grand house, built by Simpsons & Ayrton of Paddington in 1890–91 for £20,000. The final cost, £30,000 (equivalent to £3,333,000 in 2025), may well have hastened the end of the great prosperity of his branch of the family. The house, built in the Jacobean style in red brick with blue brick reticulation and stone mullioned windows, was the first in the parish to have electricity and to have a central heating system.

Like his father, he became a Justice of the Peace and Deputy Lieutenant and in 1891 High Sheriff of Hertfordshire. In later life, he was for two years, 1906–1909, Prime Warden of the Worshipful Company of Fishmongers.

A service wing and stables were added in 1913, by which time the estate had shrunk to 100 acres (0.40 km^{2}).

=== Robert Francis Hanbury (1883–1960) ===
Edmund's only son, Robert Francis Hanbury, a barrister, sold Poles in 1914 to Mr. H.J. King.

== Poles Convent ==
In 1923 the house was purchased by the Faithful Companions of Jesus with the intent of establishing a convent school. The house was transformed in 1934 with the addition of a gym, classrooms, dormitories, a three-storeyed tower, and a new chapel. From 1974, some girls from the convent school progressed into the sixth form of nearby St Edmund's College, Ware, although the two schools were independently managed. By the time the school closed in 1986 the separate St Edmund's College was fully co-educational.

=== Notable former pupils ===
- Terry Keane (1939-2008) - Irish social columnist and fashion journalist
- Sarah Badel (b. 1943) - actress
- Karren Brady (b. 1969) - sporting executive
- Pilar Ordovas, antiquities dealer

== Hotel ==
The estate was redeveloped and extended over a three-year period by Landbase Ltd as a 5-star hotel and country club, opening in 1990 with RockResorts as the first operator. The development was majority funded by local building firm Hubert C Leach.

The former parts of the main building whilst a convent school having been a gym, chapel and classrooms, formed the base for a conference and banqueting centre set around the courtyard. The latter-day chapel, renamed Poles Hall, forms the main banqueting hall. The development in 1988/89 added a wing onto the main building containing swimming pool, gym, changing rooms, squash courts, bar, brasserie restaurant, and billiard room. An annexe next to the walled garden (known as the Garden Court) added 53 bedrooms at the same time.

Country Club Hotel Group took over as the hotel operator in 1994, and subsequently was bought out by Marriott International, who added a 65-bedroom extension in 1999 and currently own and operate the hotel and golf course.

The Hanbury Manor golf course was first designed by Harry Vardon in the early 1900s as a 9-hole course, and the newer (1991) 18-hole course by Jack Nicklaus II. The course hosted the Marks & Spencer European Open in 1996 and the English Open from 1997 to 1999.

The wedding of Paul and Sheryl Gascoigne took place there in 1996.
