= Open de Sevilla =

Tournament information
- Location: Seville, Spain
- Established: 2004
- Course: Real Club de Golf de Sevilla
- Par: 72
- Length: 7,141 yards (6,530 m)
- Tour: European Tour
- Format: Stroke play
- Prize fund: €1,000,000
- Month played: April
- Final year: 2004

Tournament record score
- Aggregate: 274 Ricardo González (2004)
- To par: −14 as above

Final champion
- (Argentina) Ricardo González
- Location in Spain Location in the Province of Seville

The Open de Sevilla was a golf tournament on the European Tour that was played only once, in 2004. It was held at Real Club de Golf de Sevilla, in Seville, Spain. It was won by Argentina's Ricardo González, who finished two strokes ahead of Jonathan Lomas and Stephen Gallacher.

== Winners ==
Year	Winner	Score	To par	Margin of victory	Runners-up
2004	(Argentina) Ricardo González	274	−14	2 strokes	(Scotland) Stephen Gallacher (England) Jonathan Lomas
