= British Masters =

British golf tournament

Coordinates: 54.986°N 1.804°W

Husqvarna British Masters
Tournament information
- Location: Wishaw, Warwickshire, England
- Established: 1946
- Courses: The Belfry (Brabazon Course)
- Par: 72
- Length: 7,336 yards (6,708 m)
- Tour: European Tour
- Format: Stroke play
- Prize fund: US$3,500,000
- Month played: August

Tournament record score
- Aggregate: 260 Paul Dunne (2017)
- To par: −22 Peter Baker (1993)

Current champion
- (England) Joe Dean

Location map
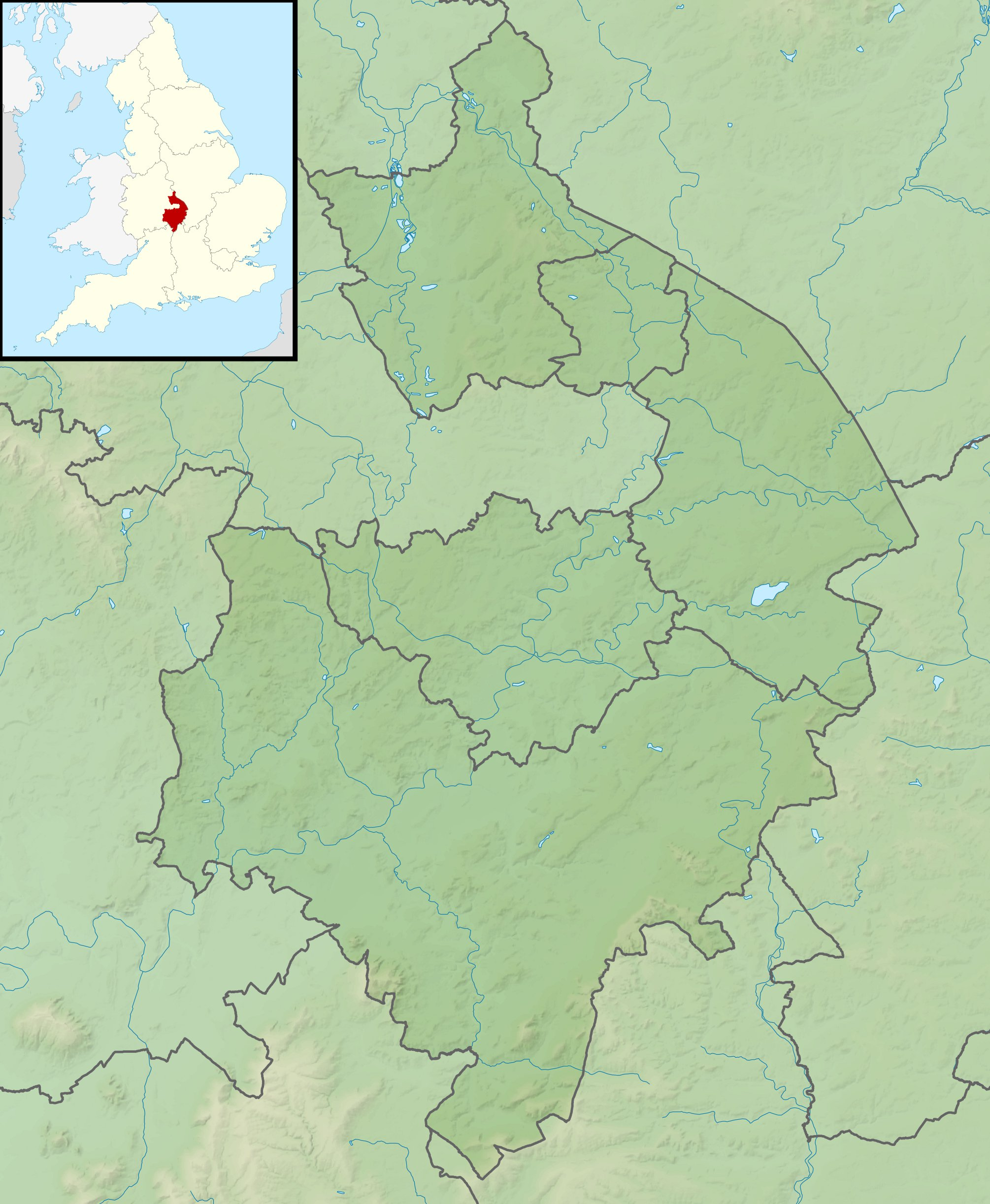
- Location in England Location in Warwickshire

The Husqvarna British Masters is a professional golf tournament. It was founded in 1946 as the Dunlop Masters and was held every year up to 2008, except for 1984. Dunlop's sponsorship ended in 1982, and the name sponsor changed frequently thereafter, with the words "British Masters" usually also in the tournament's official name. The tournament was not held from 2009 to 2014 but returned to the schedule in 2015.

== History ==
The Dunlop Masters was first held in 1946 at Stoneham Golf Club in Southampton, and was a continuation of the Dunlop-Metropolitan Tournament which had been held before World War II. Like the Dunlop-Metropolitan, the Dunlop Masters was a 72-hole end-of-season event with a restricted field. The Dunlop-Metropolitan had been first played in 1934, the same year as The Masters. The event was sponsored by Dunlop from 1946 to 1982, during which time it continued to have a small field with no 36-hole cut. There were 50 competitors in the final Dunlop-sponsored event in 1982.

During the 1980s the British Masters was one of the most lucrative events on the European Tour with a prize fund that was as high as third among the tournaments on the schedule, but its status, or at least its relative level of prize money, has declined considerably in recent years.

The tournament has been played at many different venues; twice in the "Dunlop Masters" era it was held in the Republic of Ireland. When the Quinn Group took over as sponsors in 2006, the event was moved again, this time to the Group owned Belfry.

The deal with the Quinn Group ended in 2008, and when attempts to find another sponsor were unsuccessful, the British Masters was removed from the European Tour schedule for 2009.

=== Tournament hosts ===
The event returned in 2015 with a leading British golfer choosing the golf course and hosting the event. Since then the editions have been hosted by:

- 2015: Ian Poulter at Woburn Golf Club
- 2016: Luke Donald at The Grove
- 2017: Lee Westwood at Close House Golf Club
- 2018: Justin Rose at Walton Heath Golf Club
- 2019: Tommy Fleetwood at Hillside Golf Club
- 2020: Lee Westwood at Close House Golf Club
- 2021–2022: Danny Willett at The Belfry
- 2023–2026: Nick Faldo at The Belfry

=== Notable events ===
The 1967 event provided British television with its first live hole in one, as Tony Jacklin aced the 16th hole at Royal St George's.

In the 2021 event, Richard Bland, at age 48, claimed his first European Tour victory in his 478th start on the tour.

== Winners ==
Year	Winner	Score	To par	Margin of victory	Runner(s)-up	Venue	Ref.
Husqvarna British Masters
2026	(England) Joe Dean	274	−14	3 strokes	(Spain) Nacho Elvira (New Zealand) Daniel Hillier (Denmark) Niklas Nørgaard (Denmark) Jacob Skov Olesen	The Belfry	
Betfred British Masters
2025	(Sweden) Alex Norén (2)	272	−16	1 stroke	(Denmark) Nicolai Højgaard (New Zealand) Kazuma Kobori	The Belfry	
2024	(Denmark) Niklas Nørgaard	272	−16	2 strokes	(South Africa) Thriston Lawrence	The Belfry	
2023	(New Zealand) Daniel Hillier	278	−10	2 strokes	(United States) Gunner Wiebe (England) Oliver Wilson	The Belfry	
2022	(Denmark) Thorbjørn Olesen	278	−10	1 stroke	(Sweden) Sebastian Söderberg	The Belfry	
2021	(England) Richard Bland	275	−13	Playoff	(Italy) Guido Migliozzi	The Belfry	
2020	(Italy) Renato Paratore	266	−18	3 strokes	(Denmark) Rasmus Højgaard	Close House	
2019	(Sweden) Marcus Kinhult	272	−16	1 stroke	(Scotland) Robert MacIntyre (England) Eddie Pepperell (England) Matt Wallace	Hillside	
Sky Sports British Masters
2018	(England) Eddie Pepperell	279	−9	2 strokes	(Sweden) Alexander Björk	Walton Heath	
British Masters
2017	(Republic of Ireland) Paul Dunne	260	−20	3 strokes	(Northern Ireland) Rory McIlroy	Close House	
2016	(Sweden) Alex Norén	266	−18	2 strokes	(Austria) Bernd Wiesberger	The Grove	
2015	(England) Matt Fitzpatrick	269	−15	2 strokes	(Denmark) Søren Kjeldsen (Republic of Ireland) Shane Lowry (Paraguay) Fabrizio Zanotti	Woburn	
2010–2014: No tournament
2009	Cancelled due to lack of sponsorship						
Quinn Insurance British Masters
2008	(Spain) Gonzalo Fernández-Castaño	276	−12	Playoff	(England) Lee Westwood	The Belfry	
Quinn Direct British Masters
2007	(England) Lee Westwood	273	−15	5 strokes	(England) Ian Poulter	The Belfry	
2006	(Sweden) Johan Edfors	277	−11	1 stroke	(England) Gary Emerson (Scotland) Stephen Gallacher (Sweden) Jarmo Sandelin	The Belfry	
Daily Telegraph Dunlop Masters
2005	(Denmark) Thomas Bjørn	282	−6	Playoff	(England) Brian Davis (England) David Howell	Forest of Arden	
Daily Telegraph Damovo British Masters
2004	(England) Barry Lane	272	−16	3 strokes	(Argentina) Ángel Cabrera (Argentina) Eduardo Romero	Forest of Arden	
2003	(England) Greg Owen	274	−14	3 strokes	(France) Christian Cévaër (England) Ian Poulter	Forest of Arden	
Victor Chandler British Masters
2002	(England) Justin Rose	269	−19	1 stroke	(England) Ian Poulter	Woburn	
2001	(France) Thomas Levet	274	−14	Playoff	(Sweden) Mathias Grönberg (England) David Howell (Sweden) Robert Karlsson	Woburn	
2000	(Scotland) Gary Orr	267	−21	2 strokes	(Sweden) Per-Ulrik Johansson	Woburn	
1999	(United States) Bob May	269	−19	1 stroke	(Scotland) Colin Montgomerie	Woburn	
One 2 One British Masters
1998	(Scotland) Colin Montgomerie	281	−7	1 stroke	(Sweden) Pierre Fulke (Argentina) Eduardo Romero	Forest of Arden	
1997	(New Zealand) Greg Turner	275	−13	1 stroke	(Scotland) Colin Montgomerie	Forest of Arden	
1996	(Australia) Robert Allenby	284	−4	Playoff	(Spain) Miguel Ángel Martín	Collingtree Park	
Collingtree British Masters
1995	(Scotland) Sam Torrance	270	−18	1 stroke	(New Zealand) Michael Campbell	Collingtree Park	
Dunhill British Masters
1994	(Wales) Ian Woosnam (2)	271	−17	4 strokes	(Spain) Seve Ballesteros	Woburn	
1993	(England) Peter Baker	266	−22	7 strokes	(England) Carl Mason	Woburn	
1992	(Republic of Ireland) Christy O'Connor Jnr	270	−18	Playoff	(Zimbabwe) Tony Johnstone	Woburn	
1991	(Spain) Seve Ballesteros (2)	275	−13	3 strokes	(Republic of Ireland) Eamonn Darcy (England) David Gilford (Zimbabwe) Tony Johnstone (Scotland) Sam Torrance (England) Keith Waters	Woburn	
1990	(England) Mark James	270	−18	2 strokes	(Northern Ireland) David Feherty	Woburn	
1989	(England) Nick Faldo	267	−21	4 strokes	(Northern Ireland) Ronan Rafferty	Woburn	
1988	(Scotland) Sandy Lyle	273	−15	2 strokes	(England) Nick Faldo (Zimbabwe) Mark McNulty	Woburn	
1987	(Zimbabwe) Mark McNulty	274	−14	1 stroke	(Wales) Ian Woosnam	Woburn	
1986	(Spain) Seve Ballesteros	275	−13	2 strokes	(Scotland) Gordon Brand Jnr	Woburn	
1985	(United States) Lee Trevino	278	−10	3 strokes	(Australia) Rodger Davis	Woburn	
Silk Cut Masters
1984: No tournament
1983	(Wales) Ian Woosnam	269	−15	3 strokes	(Scotland) Bernard Gallacher	St. Pierre	
Dunlop Masters
1982	(Australia) Greg Norman (2)	267	−17	8 strokes	(West Germany) Bernhard Langer	St. Pierre	
1981	(Australia) Greg Norman	273	−15	4 strokes	(Australia) Graham Marsh	Woburn	
1980	(West Germany) Bernhard Langer	270	−14	5 strokes	(Scotland) Brian Barnes	St. Pierre	
1979	(Australia) Graham Marsh	283	−5	1 stroke	(Japan) Isao Aoki (England) Neil Coles	Woburn	
1978	(England) Tommy Horton	279	−5	1 stroke	(South Africa) Dale Hayes (Australia) Graham Marsh (England) Brian Waites	St. Pierre	
1977	(England) Guy Hunt	291	+7	Playoff	(Scotland) Brian Barnes	Lindrick	
1976	(Italy) Baldovino Dassù	271	−13	1 stroke	(United States) Hubert Green	St. Pierre	
1975	(Scotland) Bernard Gallacher (2)	289	+5	2 strokes	(South Africa) Dale Hayes	Ganton	
1974	(Scotland) Bernard Gallacher	282	−2	Playoff	(South Africa) Gary Player	St. Pierre	
1973	(England) Tony Jacklin (2)	272	−12	7 strokes	(New Zealand) Bob Charles	St. Pierre	
1972	(New Zealand) Bob Charles	277	−11	2 strokes	(England) Tony Jacklin	Northumberland	
1971	(England) Maurice Bembridge	273	−11	2 strokes	(England) Peter Oosterhuis	St. Pierre	
1970	(Wales) Brian Huggett	293	+9	5 strokes	(Australia) David Graham	Royal Lytham & St Annes	
1969	(South Africa) Cobie Legrange (2)	281		3 strokes	(England) Peter Butler	Little Aston	
1968	(Australia) Peter Thomson (2)	274		5 strokes	(Wales) Dave Thomas	Sunningdale	
1967	(England) Tony Jacklin	274	ｰ6	3 strokes	(England) Neil Coles	Royal St George's	
1966	(England) Neil Coles	278		1 stroke	(Republic of Ireland) Christy O'Connor Snr (Australia) Peter Thomson	Lindrick	
1965	(England) Bernard Hunt (2)	283		1 stroke	(Australia) Peter Thomson	Portmarnock	
1964	(South Africa) Cobie Legrange	288		1 stroke	(England) Max Faulkner (England) Ralph Moffitt	Royal Birkdale	
1963	(England) Bernard Hunt	282		Playoff	(England) Ralph Moffitt	Little Aston	
1962	(Wales) Dai Rees	278		2 strokes	(England) Ralph Moffitt (Australia) Peter Thomson	Wentworth	
1961	(Australia) Peter Thomson	284		8 strokes	(Republic of Ireland) Christy O'Connor Snr	Royal Porthcawl	
1960	(England) Jimmy Hitchcock	275		2 strokes	(England) Max Faulkner (England) John Jacobs (South Africa) Bobby Locke	Sunningdale	
1959	(Republic of Ireland) Christy O'Connor Snr (2)	276		4 strokes	(Republic of Ireland) Joe Carr (a) (Northern Ireland) Norman Drew	Portmarnock	
1958	(England) Harry Weetman (2)	276		4 strokes	(South Africa) Bobby Locke	Little Aston	
1957	(Scotland) Eric Brown	275		3 strokes	(England) Peter Alliss	Notts	
1956	(Republic of Ireland) Christy O'Connor Snr	277		1 stroke	(Scotland) Eric Brown	Prestwick	
1955	(Republic of Ireland) Harry Bradshaw (2)	277		4 strokes	(England) Henry Cotton	Little Aston	
1954	(South Africa) Bobby Locke (2)	291		3 strokes	(Republic of Ireland) Harry Bradshaw	Prince's	
1953	(Republic of Ireland) Harry Bradshaw	272		3 strokes	(England) Max Faulkner	Sunningdale	
1952	(England) Harry Weetman	281		4 strokes	(England) Arthur Lees	Mere	
1951	(England) Max Faulkner	281		4 strokes	(England) Reg Horne	Wentworth	
1950	(Wales) Dai Rees	281		4 strokes	(England) Charlie Ward	Royal Liverpool	
1949	(England) Charlie Ward	290		Playoff	(England) John Burton	St Andrews	
1948	(Australia) Norman Von Nida	272		2 strokes	(Northern Ireland) Fred Daly	Sunningdale	
1947	(England) Arthur Lees	283		Playoff	(Australia) Norman Von Nida	Little Aston	
1946	(Scotland) Jimmy Adams (South Africa) Bobby Locke	286		Title shared		Stoneham	

== Multiple winners ==
- 2 wins: Seve Ballesteros, Harry Bradshaw, Bernard Gallacher, Bernard Hunt, Tony Jacklin, Cobie Legrange, Bobby Locke, Greg Norman, Christy O'Connor Snr, Dai Rees, Peter Thomson, Harry Weetman, Ian Woosnam
