= 2004 Volvo PGA Championship =

Tournament information
- Dates: 27–30 May 2004
- Location: Virginia Water, Surrey, England; 51.40°N 0.59°W
- Courses: Wentworth Club; West Course
- Tour: European Tour

Statistics
- Par: 72
- Length: 7,073 yards (6,468 m)
- Field: 156 players, 73 after cut
- Cut: 144 (E)
- Prize fund: €3,750,000
- Winner's share: €625,000

Champion
- (Scotland) Scott Drummond
- 269 (−19)

Location map
- Location in England Location in Surrey

The 2004 Volvo PGA Championship was the 50th edition of the Volvo PGA Championship, an annual professional golf tournament on the European Tour. It was held 27–30 May at the West Course of Wentworth Club in Virginia Water, Surrey, England, a suburb southwest of London.

Scott Drummond won by two strokes ahead of Ángel Cabrera.

== Course layout ==
Wentworth Club, West Course
Tee	Rating/Slope	1	2	3	4	5	6	7	8	9	Out	10	11	12	13	14	15	16	17	18	In	Total
Yardage	n/a	474	154	447	496	191	354	396	400	452	3,364	184	404	509	467	179	481	383	571	531	3,709	7,073
Par		4	3	4	5	3	4	4	4	4	35	3	4	5	4	3	4	4	5	5	37	72

== Round summaries ==
=== First round ===
Thursday, 27 May 2004

Place	Player	Score	To par
1	(South Africa) Ernie Els	64	−8
T2	(Wales) Stephen Dodd	65	−7
T2	(Sweden) Chris Hanell	65	−7
T2	(Spain) Miguel Ángel Jiménez	65	−7
T5	(Scotland) Scott Drummond	66	−6
T5	(Fiji) Vijay Singh	66	−6
T7	(Argentina) Ángel Cabrera	67	−5
T7	(Belgium) Nicolas Colsaerts	67	−5
T7	(Scotland) Andrew Coltart	67	−5
T7	(Spain) Ignacio Garrido	67	−5
T7	(England) David Gilford	67	−5
T7	(Australia) Richard Green	67	−5
T7	(Denmark) Anders Hansen	67	−5
T7	(England) Justin Rose	67	−5

=== Second round ===
Friday, 28 May 2004

Place	Player	Score	To par
1	(England) Justin Rose	67-66=133	−11
T2	(Northern Ireland) Darren Clarke	68-67=135	−9
T2	(South Africa) Ernie Els	64-71=135	−9
T2	(Sweden) Joakim Haeggman	68-67=135	−9
T2	(Wales) Phillip Price	70-65=135	−9
T6	(Argentina) Ángel Cabrera	67-69=136	−8
T6	(Wales) Stephen Dodd	65-71=136	−8
T6	(Denmark) Anders Hansen	67-69=136	−8
T6	(England) Ian Poulter	68-68=136	−8
T6	(Germany) Marcel Siem	69-67=136	−8

=== Third round ===
Saturday, 29 May 2004

Place	Player	Score	To par
1	(Argentina) Ángel Cabrera	67-69-68=204	−12
T2	(Scotland) Scott Drummond	66-71-68=205	−11
T2	(South Africa) Darren Fichardt	68-69-68=205	−11
T2	(Sweden) Joakim Haeggman	68-67-70=205	−11
T2	(England) Justin Rose	67-66-72=205	−11
6	(Northern Ireland) Darren Clarke	68-67-71=206	−10
T7	(Denmark) Thomas Bjørn	72-66-69=207	−9
T7	(South Africa) Ernie Els	64-71-72=207	−9
T7	(England) Nick Faldo	70-69-68=207	−9
T10	(Finland) Mikko Ilonen	69-72-67=208	−8
T10	(France) Thomas Levet	72-66-70=208	−8
T10	(Wales) Phillip Price	70-65-73=208	−8

=== Final round ===
Sunday, 30 May 2004

Place	Player	Score	To par	Money (€)
1	(Scotland) Scott Drummond	66-71-68-64=269	−19	625,000
2	(Argentina) Ángel Cabrera	67-69-68-67=271	−17	416,660
3	(Sweden) Joakim Haeggman	68-67-70-67=272	−16	234,750
T4	(Northern Ireland) Darren Clarke	68-67-71-67=273	−15	159,250
T4	(England) Nick Faldo	70-69-68-66=273	−15	159,250
T4	(Denmark) Anders Hansen	67-69-73-64=273	−15	159,250
7	(South Africa) Ernie Els	64-71-72-68=275	−13	112,500
T8	(South Africa) Darren Fichardt	68-69-68-71=276	−12	84,250
T8	(Spain) Miguel Ángel Jiménez	65-74-70-67=276	−12	84,250
T8	(France) Thomas Levet	72-66-70-68=276	−12	84,250

==== Scorecard ====
Hole	1	2	3	4	5	6	7	8	9	10	11	12	13	14	15	16	17	18
Par	4	3	4	5	3	4	4	4	4	3	4	5	4	3	4	4	5	5
(Scotland) Drummond	−11	−11	−11	−12	−12	−12	−13	−14	−14	−15	−15	−16	−17	−17	−17	−17	−18	−19
(Argentina) Cabrera	−12	−12	−12	−14	−13	−14	−15	−15	−15	−15	−15	−17	−17	−16	−16	−16	−17	−17
(Sweden) Haeggman	−11	−11	−12	−13	−14	−14	−13	−13	−12	−13	−13	−14	−14	−14	−14	−14	−15	−16
(Northern Ireland) Clarke	−10	−10	−10	−10	−10	−11	−11	−12	−11	−12	−13	−14	−14	−14	−14	−14	−15	−15
(England) Faldo	−8	−8	−8	−9	−9	−9	−10	−10	−10	−10	−10	−11	−12	−13	−13	−13	−14	−15
(Denmark) Hansen	−7	−7	−8	−8	−8	−8	−9	−10	−10	−10	−12	−13	−13	−13	−13	−13	−14	−15
(South Africa) Els	−9	−9	−9	−10	−11	−11	−11	−11	−10	−10	−10	−10	−11	−11	−11	−11	−12	−13
(South Africa) Fichardt	−11	−11	−11	−13	−13	−12	−11	−11	−10	−9	−10	−11	−11	−11	−11	−11	−11	−12
(England) Rose	−11	−11	−11	−12	−11	−11	−11	−10	−9	−8	−9	−10	−10	−10	−10	−10	−11	−11

Cumulative tournament scores, relative to par

Eagle	Birdie	Bogey
