= Eddie Pepperell =

English professional golfer (born 1991)

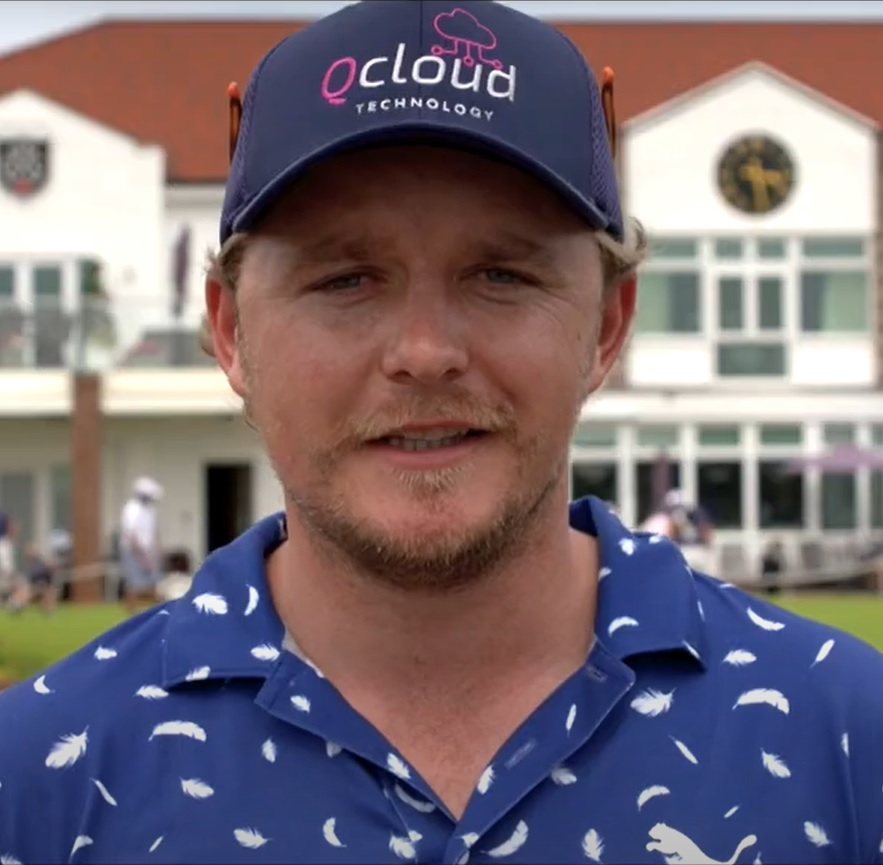
- Pepperell in 2023

Personal information
- Full name: Edward Louis Pepperell
- Nationality: England
- Born: 22 January 1991 (age 35) Oxford, England
- Height: 5 ft 11 in (1.80 m)
- Spouse: Jennifer Rhodes (m. 2024)

Career
- Sport: Golf
- Turned professional: 2011
- Current tour: European Tour
- Former tour: Challenge Tour
- Professional wins: 4
- Highest ranking: 32 (7 July 2019) (as of 25 October 2026)

Number of wins by tour
- European Tour: 2
- Challenge Tour: 1
- Other: 1

Best results in major championships
- Masters Tournament: T51: 2019
- PGA Championship: T59: 2018
- U.S. Open: T16: 2017
- The Open Championship: T6: 2018

Edward Louis Pepperell (born 22 January 1991) is an English professional golfer who plays on the European Tour. He won his first European Tour event at the Commercial Bank Qatar Masters in 2018, and his second at the Sky Sports British Masters later that year.

== Early life and amateur career ==
Pepperell was born on 22 January 1991 in Oxfordshire, England, to Marian (née Feeney) and Ron Pepperell. He grew up in Abingdon. His father Ron worked as a toolmaker for 25 years before becoming a steward at Drayton Park Golf Club. Pepperell was introduced to golf as a child and stated he spent "endless hours" at Drayton Park. His older brother Joe and younger sister Emily also played golf. Joe later became head professional at Oxford Golf Club.

Aged 12, Pepperell won the 2003 PGA Wee Wonders competition at St Andrews Links, which was considered one of the top events in Britain for that age group. Also in 2003, he won the Oxfordshire Schools Under 18 title while representing John Mason School. This broke the record for youngest winner of a county schools title in England, previously held by Justin Rose who won the Hampshire title at age 13. In 2005, Pepperell won the England Boys Under 14 Championship and the British Boys Under 14 Championship. At the time, he was a scratch handicap.

Pepperell recalled in 2013 that "golf was everything" to him while growing up and said he received "one B, five Cs, a D and an E" in his GCSEs. He left school aged 16 to focus full-time on golf. Pepperell had garnered attention from American colleges, including Oklahoma State University coach Mike McGraw, but said in 2007 that he instead wanted to follow the path of Oliver Fisher, who played in the Walker Cup aged 16 and earned a European Tour card the following year.

Pepperell reached the semi-finals of the 2008 Spanish Amateur, where he was eliminated by Jordi García Pinto. He finished runner-up in the 2009 Boys Amateur Championship, losing in the final to Tom Lewis. Pepperell won the Welsh Open Stroke Play in May 2010, which was his first major individual victory since 2005. He won the Berkshire Trophy the following month. Pepperell received funding from the English Golf Union to compete in international amateur tournaments. He finished runner-up at the Egyptian Amateur Open in October 2010, losing in a playoff to Jack Senior. This meant he qualified to make his professional tournament debut later that month at the Egyptian Open on the Challenge Tour. He made the cut and finished tied-41st. In February 2011, Pepperell won the Portuguese Amateur Championship. The win moved him up 46 places to 128th in the World Amateur Golf Ranking.

At international level, Pepperell was part of the England team which won the 2010 European Amateur Team Championship. He also played for three victorious Great Britain & Ireland teams in the Jacques Léglise Trophy (2007, 2008, 2009). He represented England at the 2010 Eisenhower Trophy, and was named to Great Britain & Ireland's 23-man preliminary squad for the 2011 Walker Cup in November 2010. He decided to turn professional prior to the 2011 Walker Cup.

== Professional career ==
=== 2011–2017 ===
Pepperell made his professional debut in May 2011 after receiving an invitation to the Mugello Tuscany Open on the Challenge Tour. He signed with the management company 4Sports & Entertainment, which also represented Edoardo Molinari and Justin Rose. Pepperell made the cut and finished tied-45th. In total, he played seven events on the 2011 Challenge Tour season, placing 138th in the rankings with earnings of €4,686. He competed in the second stage of European Tour Qualifying School in December, where he placed tied-22nd, one shot outside the top-20 cutoff, and failed to advance to the final stage.

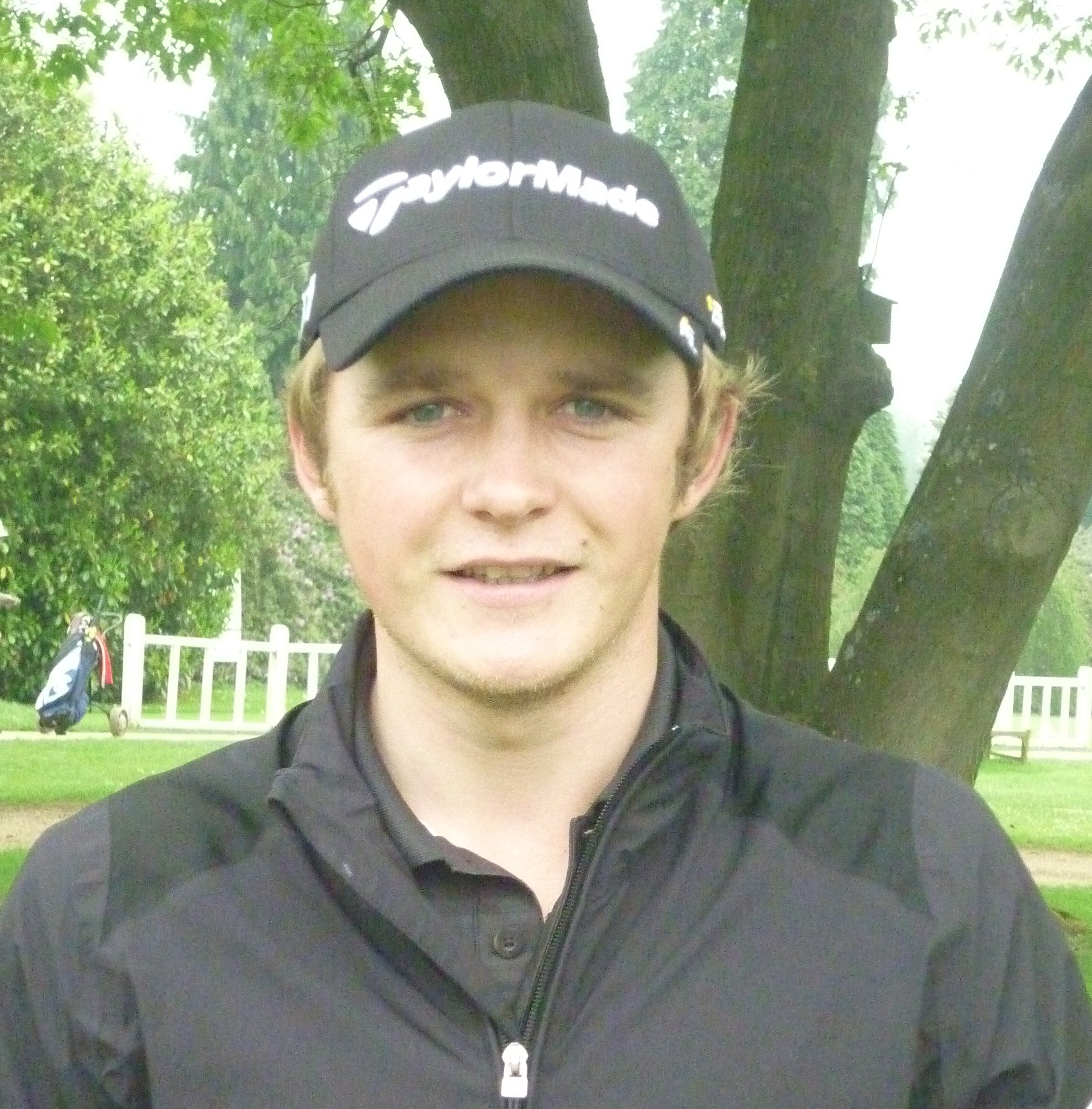
Pepperell in May 2012

In his first start of the 2012 Challenge Tour season, Pepperell shot a final-round 68 to tie for first at the Allianz Open Côtes d'Armor Bretagne in May. He defeated Jeppe Huldahl in the playoff to claim his first professional victory. The win gave Pepperell full status on the Challenge Tour for the remainder of the season. He finished 13th in the Challenge Tour rankings with earnings of €74,884, securing promotion to the European Tour.

As a rookie in the 2013 European Tour season, Pepperell was in contention at the Open de España in April, and ultimately finished in tied-eighth. The following month, he finished in a tie for sixth at the BMW PGA Championship, which earned him £120,000 and secured his card for the next year. The next day, Pepperell made it through a 36-hole qualifier at Walton Heath to win a place in the 2013 U.S. Open held at Merion Golf Club, which was his first major championship. He shot rounds of 77-77 and missed the cut. Pepperell ended the season at 76th in the European Tour rankings.

In May 2014, Pepperell was tied for the lead alongside world number two Henrik Stenson after 54 holes at the Nordea Masters. He shot a final-round 72 to finish tied-sixth. Pepperell recorded four top-5 finishes in his final ten starts of the 2014 European Tour season and placed 49th in the rankings. He signed with management company IMG in January 2015.

At the 2015 Dubai Duty Free Irish Open in May, Pepperell started the final round seven strokes behind the lead. He shot a 2-under 69 in windy conditions to enter a three-man sudden-death playoff. Søren Kjeldsen made birdie on the first extra hole to defeat Pepperell and Bernd Wiesberger. The runner-up finish earned Pepperell €217,135 and vaulted him up 44 places to 95th in the Official World Golf Ranking, marking the first time he had reached the top 100 of the world rankings. The result also meant he received entry to the 2015 Open Championship, which marked his debut in the competition. At the Open Championship, held at the Old Course at St Andrews in July, Pepperell was tied for the lead during the third round at 10-under. He drove it out of bounds on the 17th hole and ended the round at 8-under. He shot a final-round 76 to finish tied-49th.

Pepperell struggled in the 2016 European Tour season, where his best result was a sixth-place finish at the King's Cup. He missed seven cuts in his final eight starts and finished 114th in the rankings, losing his tour card. He had significant struggles off the tee, stating: "I had a sense of fear and dread of not knowing where I was going to hit my driver. I’d never experienced that before." He regained playing status through European Tour Qualifying School in November, but continued his poor form afterwards and fell outside the top 500 of the world rankings by May 2017. He advanced through a 36-hole qualifier to earn a place at the 2017 U.S. Open in June, where he finished tied-16th. Pepperell had a strong run of form at the end of the season. He finished joint-sixth at the Turkish Airlines Open in November, which was his seventh top-10 finish in his previous eight starts.

=== 2018–2019 ===
In February 2018, Pepperell broke through and won his maiden European Tour event at the Commercial Bank Qatar Masters, shooting 18-under to win by a single stroke over Oliver Fisher. The win came in his 129th start on the tour. In July, Pepperell was runner-up in the Aberdeen Standard Investments Scottish Open, a result which earned him a place in the 2018 Open Championship the following week. The runner-up finish also earned him a career-high payout of £593,478. At the Open Championship, Pepperell shot a final-round 67, the best of the day, to tie for sixth at 5-under-par.

Pepperell won his second title of the season at the Sky Sports British Masters in October 2018. Holding a three-stroke lead after three rounds, he closed with a 72 in the final round to go wire-to-wire and hold off the challenge of Alexander Björk. With the win, he moved to 33rd in the Official World Golf Ranking. Pepperell ended the 2018 European Tour season at a career-best 14th in the Race to Dubai rankings.

At the 2019 Players Championship in March, Pepperell shot a final-round 66 to finish tied-third and earned $725,000. By virtue of being inside the top 50 of the Official World Golf Ranking, Pepperell received an invitation to make his debut at the 2019 Masters Tournament. He finished tied-51st. As defending champion at the 2019 Betfred British Masters in May, he finished tied-second, one stroke behind Marcus Kinhult.

=== 2020–present ===
Pepperell held a one-stroke lead after 54 holes at the Betfred British Masters in 2021. He shot a 1-over 73 in the final round to fall into tied-11th. Pepperell finished runner-up at the Hero Open in July 2022, one shot behind Sean Crocker. It was his first top-5 finish since 2019. Having reached a career-high ranking of 32nd in the Official World Golf Ranking in 2019, Pepperell fell to 244th by April 2023.

Pepperell lost his European Tour card after finishing 120th in the 2024 European Tour rankings. He finished one stroke shy of regaining his playing status at European Tour Qualifying School in November 2024. The following month, Pepperell held the co-lead after three rounds at the AfrAsia Bank Mauritius Open. He shot a final-round 74 to finish tied-ninth. Playing on the 2025 Challenge Tour, Pepperell was tied for the lead at the Le Vaudreuil Golf Challenge in June after 54 holes, but withdrew prior to the final round due to a back injury.

At European Tour Qualifying School in November 2025, Pepperell birdied his final four holes to move inside the top-20 qualification cutoff. He finished tied-12th at 19-under and earned playing status for the 2026 European Tour season. In March 2026, Pepperell shot a final-round 64 to place solo-fifth at the Investec South African Open, which was his first top-5 finish on the European Tour since 2023.

== Personal life ==
Pepperell has been in a relationship with Jennifer Rhodes since he was 16. They married in 2024.

During 2020, Pepperell partook in a podcast alongside Andrew Cotter called The Pepper Pod, discussing golf matters and various other affairs. In 2023, they began a new podcast; The Chipping Forecast, alongside former BBC broadcaster, Iain Carter.

== Amateur wins ==
- 2010 Welsh Open Stroke Play, Berkshire Trophy
- 2011 Portuguese Amateur Championship

== Professional wins (4) ==
=== European Tour wins (2) ===
No.	Date	Tournament	Winning score	Margin of victory	Runner-up
1	25 Feb 2018	Commercial Bank Qatar Masters	−18 (65-69-66-70=270)	1 stroke	(England) Oliver Fisher
2	14 Oct 2018	Sky Sports British Masters	−9 (67-69-71-72=279)	2 strokes	(Sweden) Alexander Björk

European Tour playoff record (0–1)

No.	Year	Tournament	Opponents	Result
1	2015	Dubai Duty Free Irish Open	(Denmark) Søren Kjeldsen, (Austria) Bernd Wiesberger	Kjeldsen won with birdie on first extra hole

=== Challenge Tour wins (1) ===
No.	Date	Tournament	Winning score	Margin of victory	Runner-up
1	13 May 2012	Allianz Open Côtes d'Armor Bretagne	−3 (67-71-71-68=277)	Playoff	(Denmark) Jeppe Huldahl

Challenge Tour playoff record (1–0)

No.	Year	Tournament	Opponent	Result
1	2012	Allianz Open Côtes d'Armor Bretagne	(Denmark) Jeppe Huldahl	Won with par on first extra hole

=== Other wins (1) ===
No.	Date	Tournament	Winning score	Margin of victory	Runner-up
1	8 Aug 2014	Farmfoods British Par 3 Championship	−7 (52-49=101)	Playoff	(England) Jak Hamblett

== Results in major championships ==
Results not in chronological order in 2020.

Tournament	2013	2014	2015	2016	2017	2018
Masters Tournament						
U.S. Open	CUT				T16	
The Open Championship			T49			T6
PGA Championship			CUT			T59

Tournament	2019	2020
Masters Tournament	T51	
PGA Championship	CUT	
U.S. Open		CUT
The Open Championship	71	NT

Top 10
Did not play

CUT = missed the half-way cut
"T" indicates a tie for a place
NT = No tournament due to COVID-19 pandemic

=== Summary ===
Tournament	Wins	2nd	3rd	Top-5	Top-10	Top-25	Events	Cuts made
Masters Tournament	0	0	0	0	0	0	1	1
PGA Championship	0	0	0	0	0	0	3	1
U.S. Open	0	0	0	0	0	1	3	1
The Open Championship	0	0	0	0	1	1	3	3
Totals	0	0	0	0	1	2	10	6

- Most consecutive cuts made – 4 (2017 U.S. Open – 2019 Masters)
- Longest streak of top-10s – 1

== Results in The Players Championship ==
Tournament	2019
The Players Championship	T3

Top 10

"T" indicates a tie for a place.

== Results in World Golf Championships ==
Tournament	2019
Championship	T67
Match Play	T56
Invitational	T51
Champions	

Did not play

"T" = Tied

== Team appearances ==
Amateur

- European Boys' Team Championship (representing England): 2007, 2008, 2009
- Jacques Léglise Trophy (representing Great Britain & Ireland): 2007 (winners), 2008 (winners), 2009 (winners)
- European Amateur Team Championship (representing England): 2010 (winners)
- St Andrews Trophy (representing Great Britain & Ireland): 2010
- Eisenhower Trophy (representing England): 2010

== See also ==
- 2012 Challenge Tour graduates
- 2016 European Tour Qualifying School graduates
- 2025 European Tour Qualifying School graduates
