= The Heritage (European Tour) =

Tournament information
- Location: Milton Keynes, England
- Established: 2004
- Courses: Woburn Golf and Country Club (Duke's Course)
- Par: 72
- Length: 6,973 yards (6,376 m)
- Tour: European Tour
- Format: Stroke play
- Prize fund: €2,000,000
- Month played: September
- Final year: 2004

Tournament record score
- Aggregate: 269 Henrik Stenson (2004)
- To par: −19 as above

Final champion
- (Sweden) Henrik Stenson
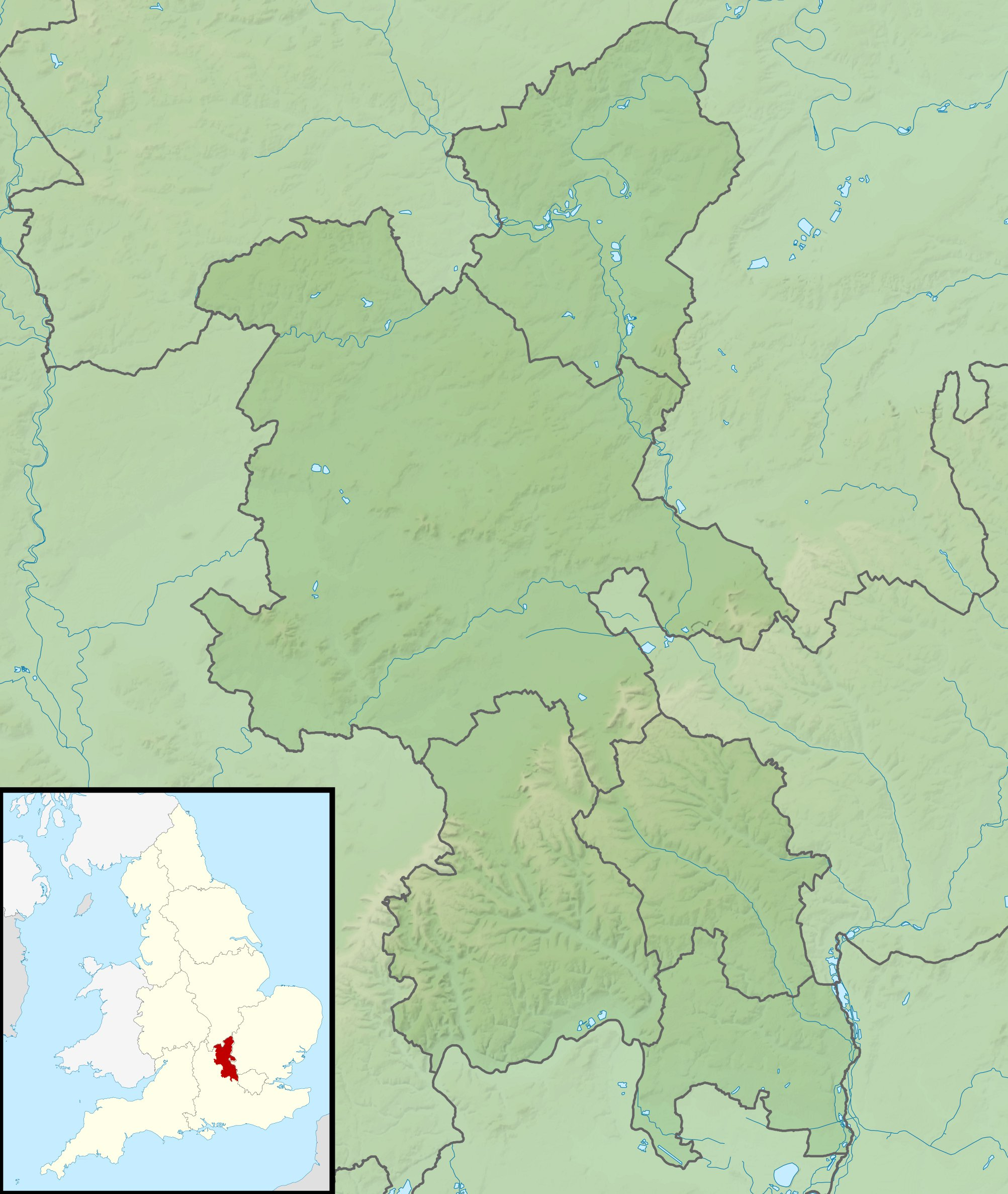
- Location in England Location in Buckinghamshire

The Heritage was a one-off European Tour men's professional golf tournament contested during the 2004 European Tour season. The event was sponsored by the International Management Group and was held in honour of Ken Schofield, who was stepping down as executive director of the European Tour after 30 years.

The Heritage was hosted on the Duke's Course at Woburn Golf and Country Club near Milton Keynes, England and offered a prize fund of €2,000,000. The winner was Henrik Stenson, who finished four strokes ahead of Carlos Rodiles.

== Winners ==
Year	Winner	Score	To par	Margin of victory	Runner-up
2004	(Sweden) Henrik Stenson	269	−19	4 strokes	(Spain) Carlos Rodiles
