= Hillside Golf Club =

Golf club in Merseyside, England

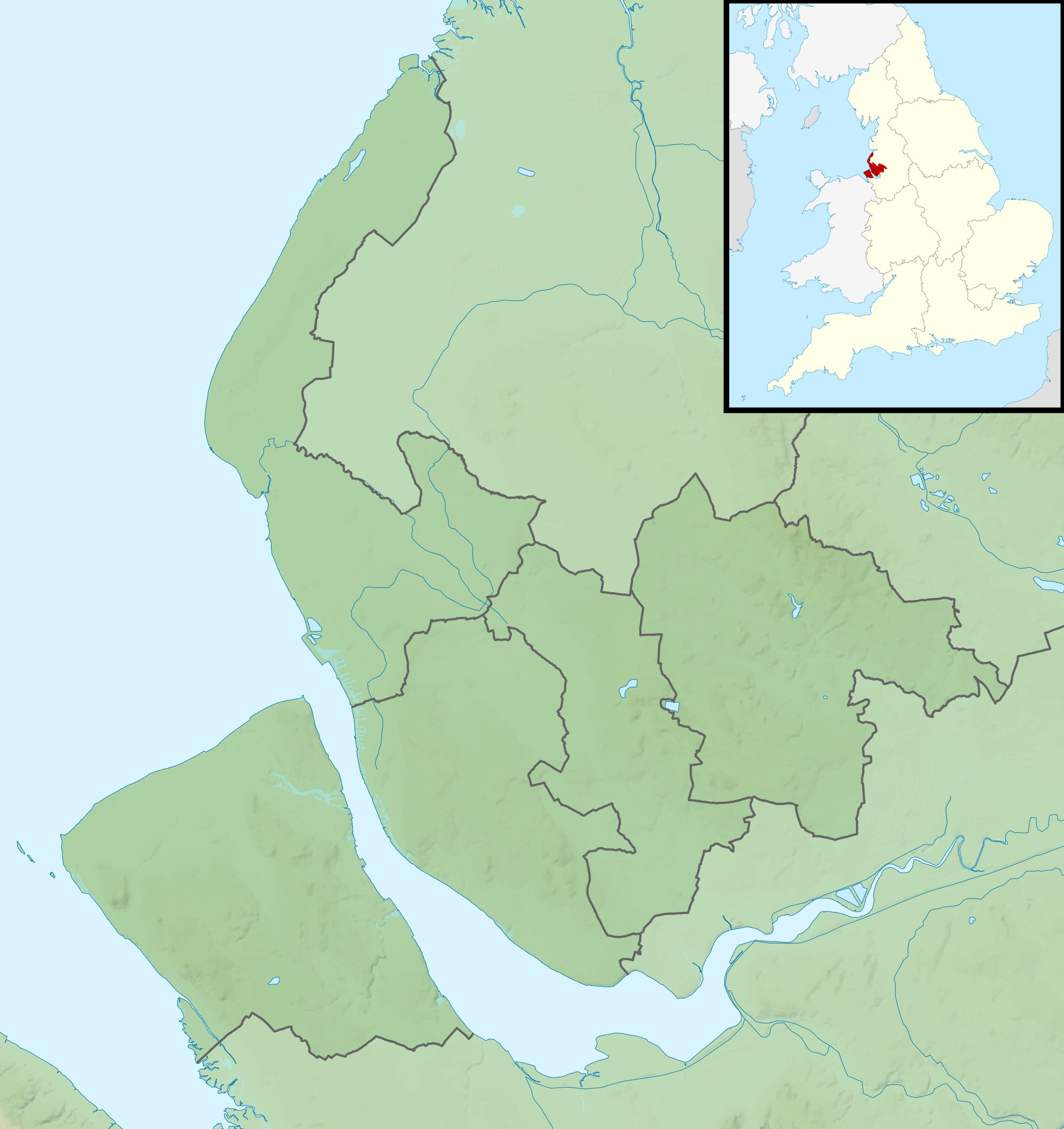
- Location in England Location in Merseyside Location in Southport
- 53.620°N 3.028°W

Club information
- Location: Hillside, Southport, England
- Established: 1911
- Type: Private
- Tota holes: 18
- Tournaments: Piccadilly Medal; British PGA Championship; British Masters; English Open; The Amateur Championship; English Amateur; Brabazon Trophy; Open Championship qualifying
- Website: hillside-golfclub.co.uk
- Designed by: Fred Hawtree (1960s)
- Par: 72
- Length: 7,029 yards (6,427 m)
- Course rating: 75.2
- Slope rating: 138

Hillside Golf Club is a golf club located in Southport, Merseyside, England. The club was founded in 1911. The 18-hole golf course, classed as a "links", has been rated as one of the best courses in England.

Hillside has hosted several major professional and amateur tournaments, including The Amateur Championship in 1979 and 2011, and qualifying rounds for The Open Championship.

== History ==
Hillside Golf Club was founded in 1911. Until the early 1920s, the club played on a 9-hole course. In 1923, further land was leased and work began on creating an 18-hole "championship" course. The new course, comprising eight holes of the old course and ten new holes, was fully opened in 1925. The modern course was created by Fred Hawtree in the 1960s, after some of the original course was sold for housing and additional land purchased. The clubhouse was originally built in the style of an Edwardian private residence, and was extended in the 1920s.

Courses closely neighbouring Hillside include Royal Birkdale Golf Club and Southport and Ainsdale Golf Club.

== Tournaments hosted ==
Hillside has hosted many professional and elite amateur tournaments, including the Piccadilly Medal (1962 and 1972), the Sun Alliance PGA Championship (1982), the Betfred British Masters (2019), the English Open (2022), The Amateur Championship (1979, 2011, and 2023), the English Amateur (1986) and the Brabazon Trophy (1971, 1981 and 1995). It has also hosted qualifying rounds for The Open Championship, historically local qualifying when the championship was held at Royal Birkdale, and final qualifying since 2014.
