= Woburn Golf and Country Club =

Golf course in Buckinghamshire, England

Coordinates: 51.991°N 0.665°W

Woburn Golf Club
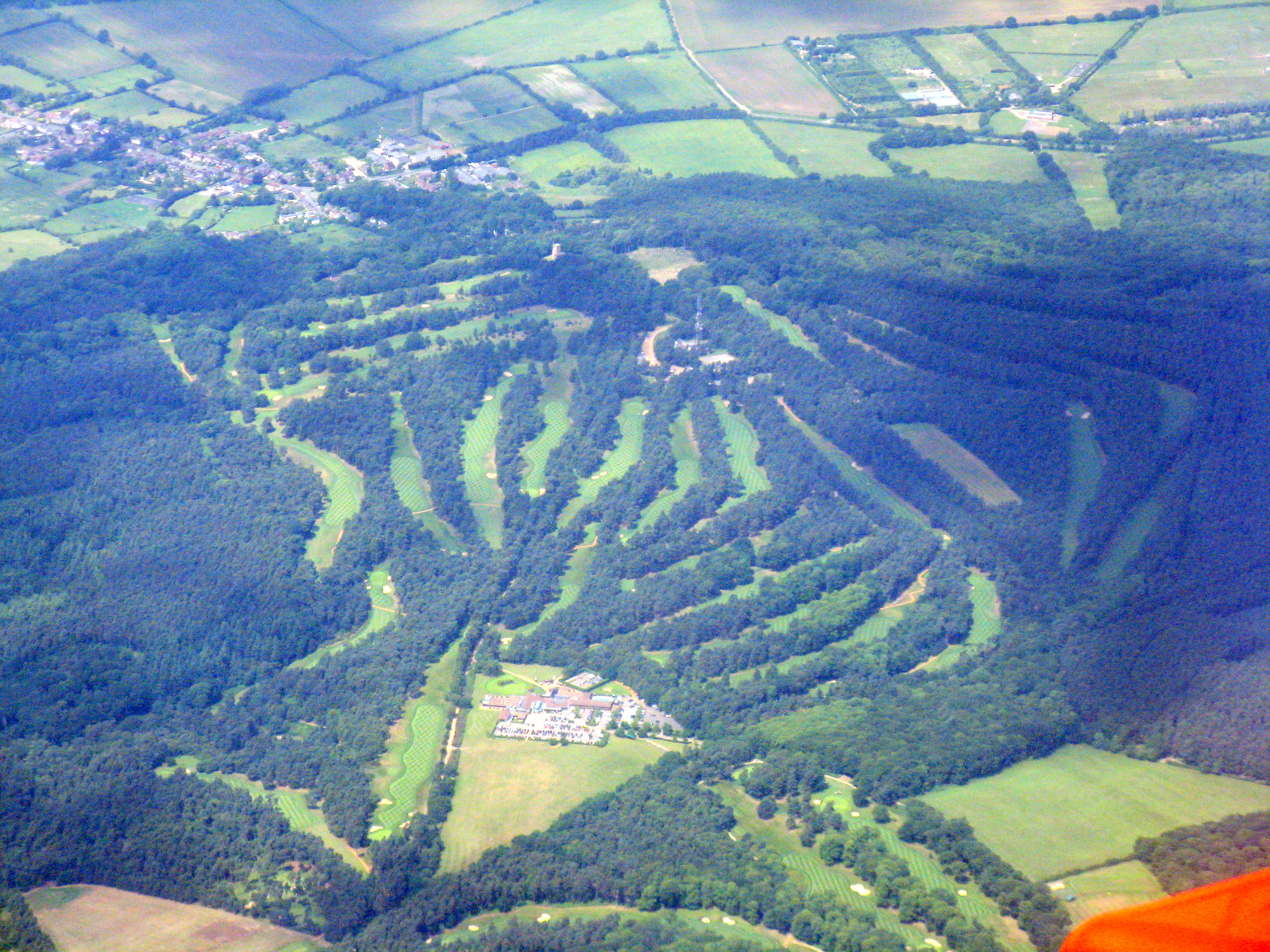

- Location in England Location in the United Kingdom

Club information
- Location: Near Milton Keynes, Buckinghamshire, England
- Established: 1976, 50 years ago
- Total holes: 54
- Tournaments: British Masters; The Heritage; Women's British Open (11); Ford Ladies Classic; Travis Perkins Masters
- Website: Woburn Golf

Duke's Course
- Par: 72
- Length: 6,971 yards (6,374 m)

Duchess Course
- Par: 72
- Length: 6,555 yards (5,994 m)

Marquess Course
- Par: 72
- Length: 7,218 yards (6,600 m)

Woburn Golf Club is a golf club in England located in Little Brickhill, near Milton Keynes within the county of Buckinghamshire, about fifty miles (80 km) northwest of central London.

There are three courses at the Woburn property: the "Duke's Course", which opened in 1976; the "Duchess Course", both designed by Charles Lawrie, which followed in 1978; and the "Marquess Course", designed by Peter Alliss and Clive Clark, European Golf Design (Ross McMurray), and Alex Hay, which dates from 2000. The courses are situated amid mature woodland on the Duke of Bedford's Woburn Abbey estate.

Ryder Cup and PGA Tour player Ian Poulter of England is the club's Men's "touring professional".

Solheim Cup and LPGA Tour player Charley Hull of England is the club's Ladies "touring professional".

== Tournaments ==
The European Tour's British Masters was played at Woburn many times between 1979 and 2002, initially over the Duke's Course, and later over the Marquess Course. Another European Tour event, The Heritage, was staged at Woburn in 2004.

Since 1984, Woburn has hosted the Women's British Open, one of the women's majors, eleven times, most recently in 2019. The first nine editions at Woburn were on the Duke's Course, whilst the 2016 edition was the first of two on the Marquess Course. The club has hosted many other Ladies European Tour events: the Ford Ladies' Classic was played on the Duke's Course from 1982 through 1984, then moved to the Duchess Course in 1985; the final edition at Woburn was in 1994, won by Catrin Nilsmark in April.

Woburn has also hosted the Travis Perkins Masters on the European Senior Tour since its foundation in 2001.
