= Scott Drummond =

Scottish golfer (born 1974)

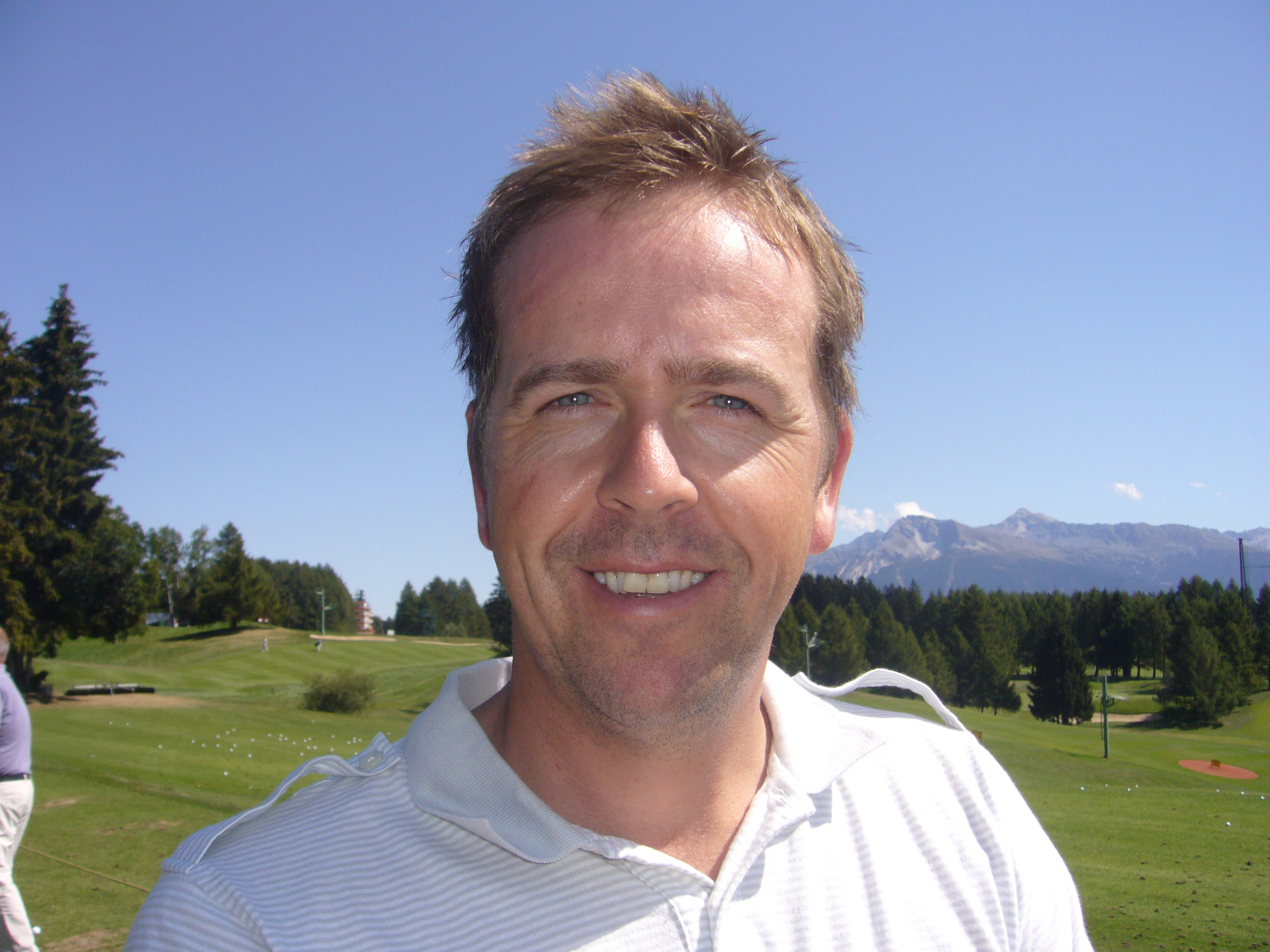

Personal information
- Nickname: Drum
- Nationality: England; Scotland (since 1996)
- Born: 29 May 1974 (age 52) Shrewsbury, England
- Height: 1.80 m (5 ft 11 in)
- Weight: 80 kg (180 lb; 13 st)

Career
- Sport: Golf
- Turned professional: 1996
- Current tour: Legends Tour
- Former tours: European Tour; Challenge Tour
- Professional wins: 6
- Highest ranking: 92 (27 June 2004)

Number of wins by tour
- European Tour: 1
- Challenge Tour: 2
- Other: 2

Best results in major championships
- Masters Tournament: DNP
- PGA Championship: T66: 2004
- U.S. Open: DNP
- The Open Championship: T23: 2005

Achievements and awards
- Sir Henry Cotton Rookie of the Year: 2004

Scott Drummond (born 29 May 1974) is a Scottish professional golfer.

== Early life and amateur career ==
Drummond was born in Shrewsbury, England. He represented England as an amateur golfer.

== Professional career ==
In 1996, Drummond turned pro. He decided to represent Scotland, the country of his father, as a professional. In the early years of his career Drummond struggled to win a regular place on the main European Tour, and spent a good deal of his time on the second tier Challenge Tour. In 2004 he claimed a surprise win in the prestigious Volvo PGA Championship, which catapulted him 340 places, from 435th to 95th in the world rankings, and gave him a five-year exemption on the European Tour. He ended the season in 23rd place on the Order of Merit, and was selected as the Sir Henry Cotton Rookie of the Year. He had a consistent 2005 season, but since then he has struggled to reproduce that form, finishing well outside the top 100 on the Order of Merit each season.

== Professional wins (6) ==
=== European Tour wins (1) ===
Legend
Flagship events (1)
Other European Tour (0)

No.	Date	Tournament	Winning score	Margin of victory	Runner-up
1	30 May 2004	Volvo PGA Championship	−19 (66-71-68-64=269)	2 strokes	(Argentina) Ángel Cabrera

=== Challenge Tour wins (2) ===
No.	Date	Tournament	Winning score	Margin of victory	Runner(s)-up
1	1 Jul 2001	Open des Volcans	−17 (66-70-69-66=271)	1 stroke	(France) Marc Pendariès
2	5 Oct 2003	Open de Toulouse	−19 (66-67-65-71=269)	Playoff	(France) Alexandre Balicki, (Wales) Mark Mouland

Challenge Tour playoff record (1–0)

No.	Year	Tournament	Opponents	Result
1	2003	Open de Toulouse	(France) Alexandre Balicki, (Wales) Mark Mouland	Won with birdie on first extra hole

=== EuroPro Tour wins (2) ===
- 1998 Hawkstone Park
- 1999 Frilford Heath

=== Jamega Pro Golf Tour wins (2) ===
No.	Date	Tournament	Winning score	Margin of victory	Runners-up
1	16 Jul 2012	Aldwickbury	−7 (67-68=135)	3 strokes	(England) Nick Flynn, (England) David James

== Results in major championships ==
Tournament	2004	2005	2006	2007
The Open Championship	CUT	T23	CUT	CUT
PGA Championship	T66			

Note: Drummond never played in the Masters Tournament or the U.S. Open.

Did not play

CUT = missed the half-way cut
"T" = tied

== Results in World Golf Championships ==
Tournament	2004
Match Play	
Championship	T43
Invitational	T61

Did not play

"T" = Tied

== Team appearances ==
Amateur

- European Boys' Team Championship (representing England): 1991
- Jacques Léglise Trophy (representing Great Britain & Ireland): 1992 (winners)
- European Youths' Team Championship (representing England): 1994

Professional

- World Cup (representing Scotland): 2004, 2005

== See also ==
- 2009 European Tour Qualifying School graduates
