= Forest of Arden Hotel and Country Club =

Hotel and country club complex in England

Coordinates: 52.460°N 1.657°W

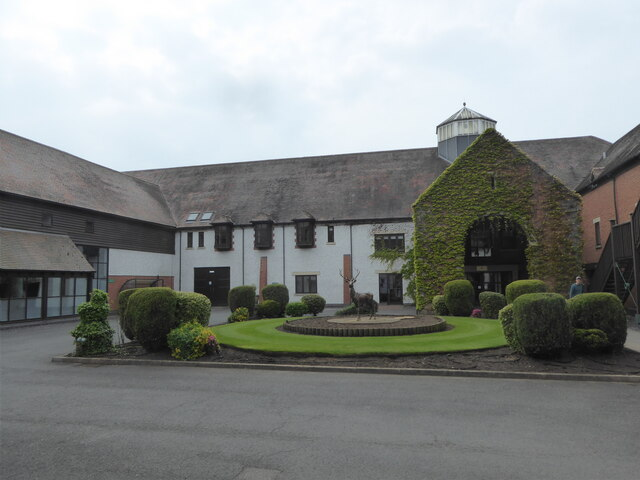
The entrance courtyard at the Forest of Arden Hotel

The Forest of Arden Hotel & Country Club is a hotel and country club complex in England. It is located 4 miles (6 km) to the east of Birmingham Airport in Warwickshire. In October 2023, it was acquired by Blackstone Inc. to be operated under their Warner Leisure Hotels brand. I was previously operated by Marriott Hotels & Resorts.

The Forest of Arden has two golf courses, the Arden and the Aylesford, both of which were designed by Donald Steel, and a golf academy. The Arden is the championship course, and has been the venue for many prestigious tournaments, including European Tour events, the British Masters on three occasions, and the English Open four times between 1993 and 1996.
