= 1983 European Tour =

Golf tour season

1983 European Tour season
- Duration: 8 April 1983 – 6 November 1983
- Number of official events: 27 (Note: One further tournament was scheduled but was cancelled.)
- Most wins: (England) Nick Faldo (5)
- Official money list: (England) Nick Faldo
- Sir Henry Cotton Rookie of the Year: (England) Grant Turner

The 1983 European Tour, titled as the 1983 PGA European Tour, was the 12th season of the European Tour, the main professional golf tour in Europe since its inaugural season in 1972.

== Changes for 1983 ==
There were several changes from the previous season, with the addition of the Timex Open and the Glasgow Golf Classic, and the loss of the Welsh Golf Classic. A new Welsh Open was scheduled, to replace the classic, but cancelled prior to the start of the season.

== Schedule ==
The following table lists official events during the 1983 season.

Date	Tournament	Host country	Purse (£)	Winner (Note: The number in brackets after each winner's name is the number of European Tour events they had won up to and including that tournament. This information is only shown for European Tour members and are inclusive of the three United States-based major championships which were included on the schedule for the first time in 1998, with earlier editions having retrospectively been recognised as official tour wins.)	Notes
11 Apr	Masters Tournament	United States	US$500,000	(Spain) Seve Ballesteros (19)	Major championship (Note: Unofficial money event at the time, but retrospectively counted as an official win.)
17 Apr	Tunisian Open	Tunisia	60,000	(England) Mark James (6)	
24 Apr	Cepsa Madrid Open	Spain	55,000	(Scotland) Sandy Lyle (8)	
1 May	Italian Open	Italy	55,000	(West Germany) Bernhard Langer (5)	
8 May	Paco Rabanne Open de France	France	50,000	(England) Nick Faldo (6)	
15 May	Martini International	England	80,000	(England) Nick Faldo (7)	
22 May	Car Care Plan International	England	60,000	(England) Nick Faldo (8)	
30 May	Sun Alliance PGA Championship	England	90,000	(Spain) Seve Ballesteros (20)	
5 Jun	Silk Cut Masters	Wales	100,000	(Wales) Ian Woosnam (2)	
12 Jun	Jersey Open	Jersey	50,000	(England) Jeff Hall (1)	
19 Jun	Timex Open	France	50,000	(Spain) Manuel Ballesteros (1)	New to European Tour
19 Jun	U.S. Open	United States	US$500,000	(United States) Larry Nelson (n/a)	Major championship
26 Jun	Glasgow Golf Classic	Scotland	80,000	(West Germany) Bernhard Langer (6)	New tournament
3 Jul	Scandinavian Enterprise Open	Sweden	85,000	(Scotland) Sam Torrance (6)	
9 Jul	State Express Classic	England	90,000	(South Africa) Hugh Baiocchi (6)	
17 Jul	The Open Championship	England	400,000	(United States) Tom Watson (8)	Major championship
24 Jul	Lawrence Batley International	England	100,000	(England) Nick Faldo (9)	
31 Jul	Lufthansa German Open	West Germany	65,000	(United States) Corey Pavin (1)	
7 Aug	KLM Dutch Open	Netherlands	80,000	(Scotland) Ken Brown (2)	
7 Aug	PGA Championship	United States	US$600,000	(United States) Hal Sutton (n/a)	Major championship
14 Aug	Carroll's Irish Open	Ireland	110,000	(Spain) Seve Ballesteros (21)	
21 Aug	Benson & Hedges International Open	England	110,000	(South Africa) John Bland (1)	
28 Aug	Welsh Open	Wales	–	Cancelled	
4 Sep	Panasonic European Open	England	140,000	(Japan) Isao Aoki (1)	
11 Sep	Ebel European Masters Swiss Open	Switzerland	125,000	(England) Nick Faldo (10)	
18 Sep	St. Mellion Timeshare TPC	England	80,000	(West Germany) Bernhard Langer (7)	
25 Sep	Bob Hope British Classic	England	110,000	(Spain) José María Cañizares (5)	Pro-Am
2 Oct	Trophée Lancôme	France	85,000	(Spain) Seve Ballesteros (22)	Limited-field event
23 Oct	Benson & Hedges Spanish Open	Spain	55,000	(Republic of Ireland) Eamonn Darcy (2)	
30 Oct	Sanyo Open	Spain	80,000	(Republic of Ireland) Des Smyth (5)	
6 Nov	Portuguese Open	Portugal	45,000	(Scotland) Sam Torrance (7)	

=== Unofficial events ===
The following events were sanctioned by the European Tour, but did not carry official money, nor were wins official.

Date	Tournament	Host country	Purse (£)	Winner(s)	Notes
9 Oct	Suntory World Match Play Championship	England	125,000	(Australia) Greg Norman	Limited-field event
16 Oct	Cacharel World Under-25 Championship	France	n/a	(England) Michael McLean	
16 Oct	Ryder Cup	United States	n/a	Team USA	Team event
11 Dec	World Cup	Indonesia	n/a	(United States) Rex Caldwell and (United States) John Cook	Team event
11 Dec	World Cup Individual Trophy	Indonesia	n/a	(Canada) Dave Barr	

== Official money list ==
The official money list was based on prize money won during the season, calculated in Pound sterling.

Position	Player	Prize money (£)
1	(England) Nick Faldo	119,416
2	(Spain) Seve Ballesteros	99,502
3	(West Germany) Bernhard Langer	73,734
4	(Spain) José María Cañizares	68,345
5	(Scotland) Sandy Lyle	54,218
6	(Scotland) Sam Torrance	50,381
7	(Scotland) Ken Brown	44,350
8	(Republic of Ireland) Eamonn Darcy	43,299
9	(Wales) Ian Woosnam	43,000
10	(England) Brian Waites	42,826

== Awards ==
Award	Winner	Ref.
Sir Henry Cotton Rookie of the Year	(England) Grant Turner	
