= Eamonn Darcy =

Irish professional golfer

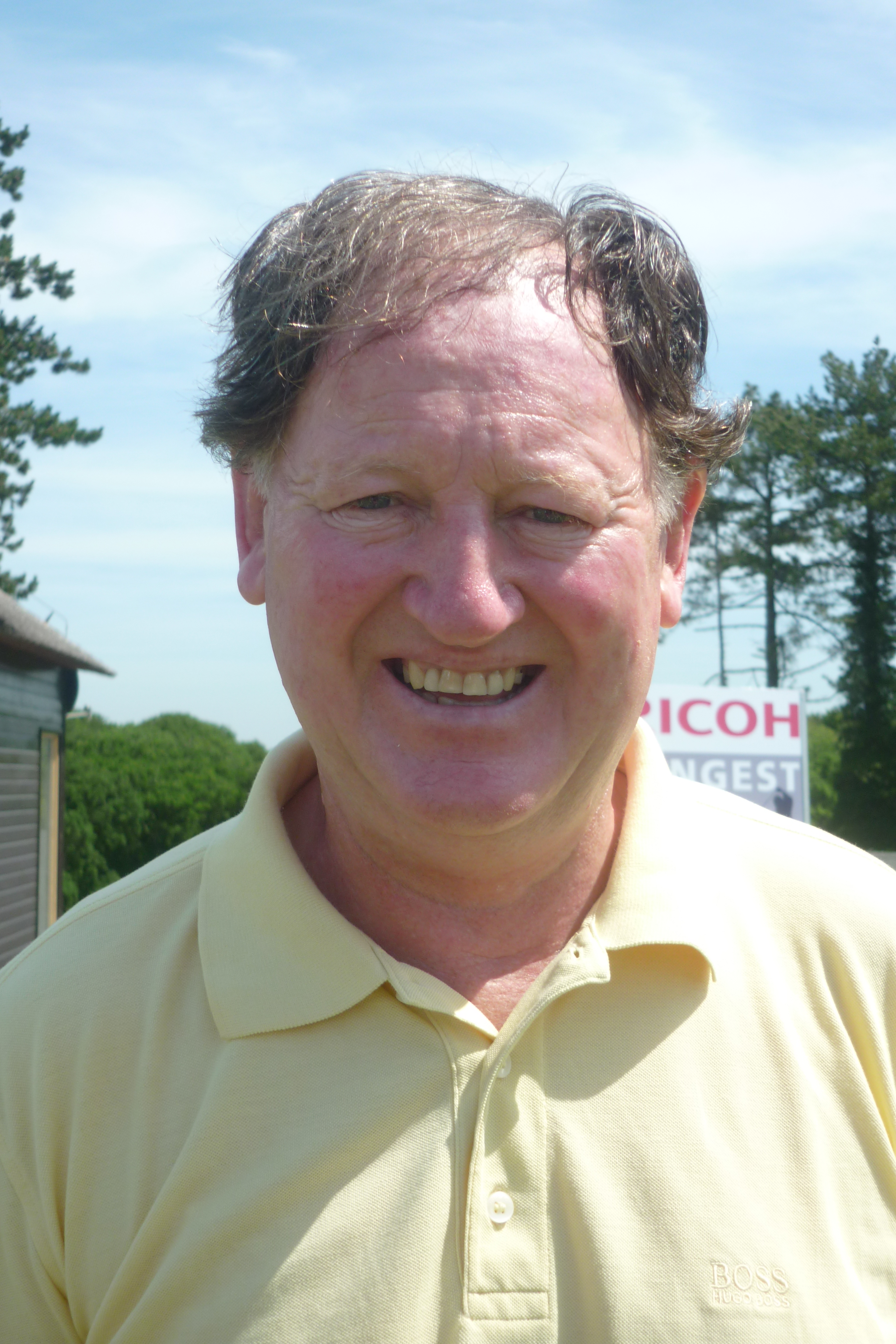
- Darcy at the 2010 Dutch Senior Open

Personal information
- Full name: Eamonn Christopher Darcy
- Nationality: Ireland
- Born: 7 August 1952 (age 74) Delgany, County Wicklow, Ireland
- Height: 6 ft 1 in (1.85 m)
- Children: 2

Career
- Sport: Golf
- Turned professional: 1968
- Current tour: European Seniors Tour
- Former tour: European Tour
- Professional wins: 16
- Highest ranking: 57 (4 August 1991)

Number of wins by tour
- European Tour: 4
- PGA Tour of Australasia: 2
- Other: 10

Best results in major championships
- Masters Tournament: DNP
- PGA Championship: DNP
- U.S. Open: DNP
- The Open Championship: T5: 1991

Eamonn Christopher Darcy (born 7 August 1952) is an Irish professional golfer. He won four times on the European Tour and played in the Ryder Cup four times.

== Professional career ==
Darcy, with a handicap of 12, turned professional at the age of 16, becoming an assistant at Grange Golf Club in Dublin. The following year he moved to Erewash Valley Golf Club in Derbyshire, staying until 1979.

Darcy's tournament career coincided with the start of the European Tour in 1972. He first came to notice in 1974 when he was a joint runner-up in the Nigerian Open. In Europe he was tied for third place in the Portuguese Open and tied sixth in the Dunlop Masters, finishing 36th in the Order of Merit.

Darcy finished third on the Order of Merit in 1975 and made that year's Ryder Cup team, his first of four performances. The following year he was second on the Order of Merit, only behind Ballesteros. Despite a number of great performances, however, Darcy did not win either season. This became something of a trend as Darcy only posted four European Tour wins compared to 13 runner-ups. This was punctuated by his tough-luck playoff record of 0–4.

Darcy's first European Tour win was at the Greater Manchester Open in 1977, handily defeating a trio of British golfers by 8 shots. In the off-season, Darcy would often play on the Australian Tour with much success, winning the 1980 Air New Zealand Shell Open and the 1981 West Lakes Classic. He would also finish runner-up at the 1980 New Zealand Open.

Darcy was a consistent performer on the European Tour in the 1980s, finishing in the top 30 of the Order of Merit eight times. He won the 1983 Benson & Hedges Spanish Open and 1987 Volvo Belgian Open, shooting a final round 64 to defeat Nick Faldo and Ian Woosnam down the stretch. However, his greatest moment may have come at the historic 1987 Ryder Cup. In his last Ryder Cup match, he defeated American Ben Crenshaw on the last hole to secure an individual win and the team's 13th point. His performance was indispensable as it ultimately determined an outright win. (Europe would win by the score 15–13.) His victory was especially memorable as he had an extremely poor Ryder Cup record (0–8–2) entering the match. It was his only Ryder Cup win as an individual (or member of a team).

Darcy's career began to wind down in the 1990s. He recorded his final official victory at the 1990 Emirates Airlines Desert Classic. The following year, he contended for a major championship for the first time at the 1991 Open Championship. He entered the final round just one shot out of the lead. He could not keep up with the rest of the leaders but his even-par 70 was good enough for T-5, his best finish ever in a major. Though he still kept his card through the decade, 1991 was the last season he was in the top 50 of the Order of Merit. In 2002 he joined the European Seniors Tour.

Darcy was noted for having one of golf's strangest swings.

== Professional wins (16) ==
=== European Tour wins (4) ===
No.	Date	Tournament	Winning score	Margin of victory	Runner(s)-up
1	19 Jun 1977	Greater Manchester Open	−11 (69-67-66-67=269)	8 strokes	(Scotland) Brian Barnes, (Scotland) Ken Brown, (England) John Morgan
2	23 Oct 1983	Benson & Hedges Spanish Open	−11 (67-71-67-72=277)	1 stroke	(Spain) Manuel Piñero
3	20 Jun 1987	Volvo Belgian Open	−13 (69-67-64=200) (Note: Shortened to 54 holes due to weather.)	1 stroke	(England) Nick Faldo, (Northern Ireland) Ronan Rafferty, (Wales) Ian Woosnam
4	25 Feb 1990	Emirates Airlines Desert Classic	−12 (64-68-75-69=276)	4 strokes	(Northern Ireland) David Feherty

European Tour playoff record (0–4)

No.	Year	Tournament	Opponent(s)	Result
1	1976	Penfold PGA Championship	(England) Neil Coles, (South Africa) Gary Player	Coles won with par on third extra hole Player eliminated by par on first hole
2	1982	Jersey Open	(Scotland) Bernard Gallacher, (Republic of Ireland) Des Smyth	Gallacher won with par on fifth extra hole Darcy eliminated by birdie on second hole
3	1983	State Express Classic	(South Africa) Hugh Baiocchi, (United States) Mike Sullivan	Baiocchi won with birdie on first extra hole
4	1991	Murphy's Cup	(Zimbabwe) Tony Johnstone	Lost to eagle on second extra hole

=== PGA Tour of Australasia wins (2) ===
No.	Date	Tournament	Winning score	Margin of victory	Runner-up
1	30 Nov 1980	Air New Zealand Shell Open	−12 (68-62-70-68=268)	2 strokes	(United States) Lanny Wadkins
2	25 Oct 1981	CBA West Lakes Classic	−7 (68-71-72-74=285)	Playoff	(Scotland) Sam Torrance

PGA Tour of Australasia playoff record (1–0)

No.	Year	Tournament	Opponent	Result
1	1981	CBA West Lakes Classic	(Scotland) Sam Torrance	Won with birdie on first extra hole

=== Safari Circuit wins (3) ===
No.	Date	Tournament	Winning score	Margin of victory	Runner(s)-up
1	22 Mar 1981	Cock of the North	−11 (72-68-73-68=281)	1 stroke	(England) Carl Mason
2	14 Mar 1982	Benson & Hedges Kenya Open	−10 (72-65-67-70=274)	1 stroke	(England) David Jagger
3	18 Mar 1984	Mufulira Open	−13 (68-69-70-72=279)	1 stroke	(England) Roger Chapman, (England) Tommy Horton

=== Other wins (7) ===
- 1976 Sumrie-Bournemouth Better-Ball (with Christy O'Connor Jnr), Cacharel World Under-25 Championship, Irish Dunlop Tournament
- 1978 Sumrie-Bournemouth Better-Ball (with Christy O'Connor Jnr)
- 1981 Carroll's Irish Match Play Championship
- 1988 Irish National PGA Championship
- 1992 Irish National PGA Championship

== Playoff record ==
Champions Tour playoff record (0–1)

No.	Year	Tournament	Opponent	Result
1	2003	Farmers Charity Classic	(United States) Doug Tewell	Lost to birdie on third extra hole

European Senior Tour playoff record (0–3)

No.	Year	Tournament	Opponent	Result
1	2002	Estoril Seniors Tour Championship	(England) Denis Durnian	Lost after concession on first extra hole
2	2005	Nokia 9300 Italian Seniors Open	(France) Géry Watine	Lost to birdie on first extra hole
3	2009	Son Gual Mallorca Senior Open	(England) Mark James	Lost to birdie on third extra hole

== Results in major championships ==
Tournament	1975	1976	1977	1978	1979
The Open Championship	CUT	T15	T34	CUT	CUT

Tournament	1980	1981	1982	1983	1984	1985	1986	1987	1988	1989
The Open Championship	T45	T14	T35	T26	CUT	T11	T59	T17	CUT	CUT

Tournament	1990	1991	1992	1993	1994	1995	1996
The Open Championship	T22	T5					T33

Note: Darcy only played in The Open Championship.

Top 10
Did not play

CUT = missed the half-way cut (3rd round cut in 1975 and 1984 Open Championships)
"T" indicates a tie for a place

== Team appearances ==
- Ryder Cup (representing Great Britain and Ireland/Europe): 1975, 1977, 1981, 1987 (winners)
- Double Diamond International (representing Ireland): 1975, 1976, 1977
- Datsun International (representing Great Britain and Ireland): 1976
- Hennessy Cognac Cup (representing Great Britain and Ireland): 1976 (winners), (representing Ireland) 1984 (captain)
- Philip Morris International (representing Ireland): 1976
- World Cup (representing Ireland): 1976, 1977, 1983, 1984, 1985, 1987, 1991
- Alfred Dunhill Cup (representing Ireland): 1987, 1988 (winners), 1991

== See also ==
- List of people on the postage stamps of Ireland
