= English Classic =

Tournament information
- Location: Warwickshire, England
- Established: 1979
- Course: The Belfry
- Par: 72
- Tour: European Tour
- Format: Stroke play
- Prize fund: £90,000
- Month played: July
- Final year: 1983

Tournament record score
- Aggregate: 279 Greg Norman (1982); 279 Hugh Baiocchi (1983); 279 Eamonn Darcy (1983); 279 Mike Sullivan (1983)
- To par: −13 Greg Norman (1982)

Final champion
- (South Africa) Hugh Baiocchi
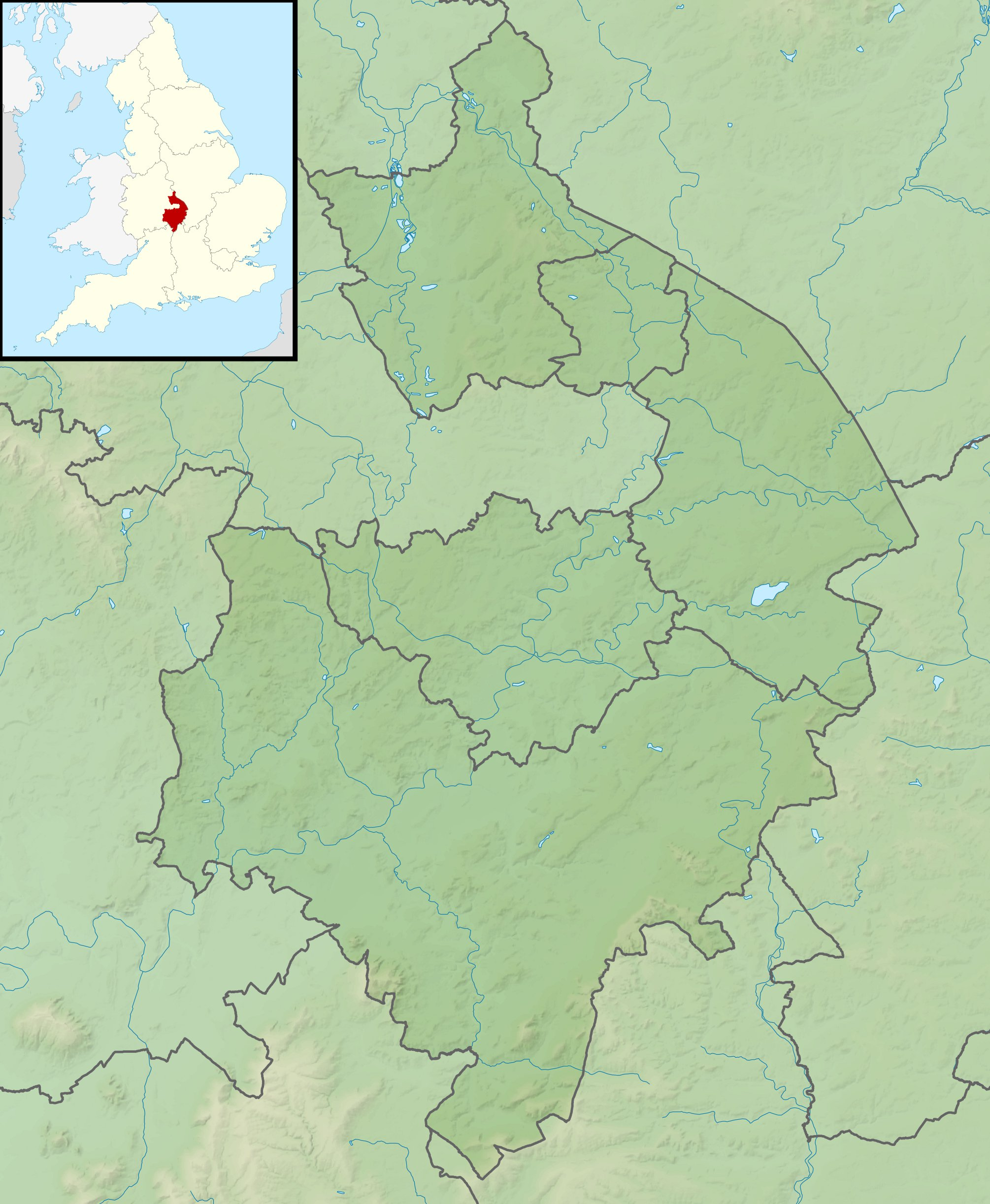
- Location in England Location in Warwickshire

The English Classic was a professional golf tournament which was played annually from 1979 to 1983. It was a fixture on the European Tour schedule, and hosted at The Belfry in Wishaw, Warwickshire, England.

Two of the five winners were major championship winners and World Number 1 golfers, namely the Australian Greg Norman and the Spaniard Seve Ballesteros. In 1983 the prize fund was £90,000, which was mid range for a European Tour event at that time.

== Winners ==
Year	Winner	Score	To par	Margin of victory	Runner(s)-up
State Express Classic
1983	(South Africa) Hugh Baiocchi	279	−9	Playoff	(Republic of Ireland) Eamonn Darcy (United States) Mike Sullivan
State Express English Classic
1982	(Australia) Greg Norman	279	−13	1 stroke	(Scotland) Brian Marchbank
State Express Classic
1981	(Australia) Rodger Davis	283	−5	2 strokes	(Australia) Greg Norman
Mazda Cars English Classic
1980	(Spain) Manuel Piñero	286	−2	1 stroke	(Scotland) Sandy Lyle
Lada English Golf Classic
1979	(Spain) Seve Ballesteros	286	−2	6 strokes	(England) Neil Coles (South Africa) Simon Hobday
