= Fairmont St Andrews =

Hotel in Fife, Scotland

Coordinates: 56°19′13″N 2°43′51″W

Fairmont St Andrews Bay
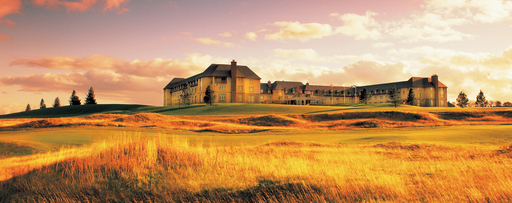
- Exterior view of the hotel
- Interactive map of the Fairmont St Andrews Bay area

General information
- Location: St Andrews, Fife, Scotland
- Opening: 2001
- Owner: Accor S.A.
- Operator: Fairmont Hotels and Resorts

Other information
- Number of rooms: 209
- Number of suites: 17

Website
- Fairmont St Andrews

The Fairmont St Andrews Bay is a resort hotel situated 2 miles (3.2 km) outside the town of St. Andrews in Fife, Scotland. The hotel is managed by Fairmont Hotels and Resorts and owned by Accor, a French hospitality company.

== History ==
The resort opened in June 2001 as St Andrews Bay Golf Resort & Spa owned by US entrepreneur Don Panoz, as part of the Château Élan Hotels & Resorts consortium. In 2006 the resort was bought by Apollo Real Estate Advisors. This prompted a name change to Fairmont St Andrews Bay. In August 2014 it was announced Kennedy Wilson Real Estate had purchased the property, with FRHI Hotel & Resorts continuing to manage the hotel and its operations.

In 2008-9 the resort underwent a £17 million renovation, with all 209 guest rooms and the Signature Spa refurbished. The public areas were also upgraded, including the lobby, corridors, atrium and Kittocks Bar. The Rock and Spindle bar had been opened the previous year, and the conference centre had also been refurbished. At this time the two golf courses were also altered and the Devlin Course was renamed the Kittocks Course.

In 2017, Fairmont St Andrews Bay underwent another renovation. Managed by designers RPW, the redevelopment was influenced by the history and landscapes of St Andrews and involved a complete redesign of the hotel's atrium.

== Facilities ==
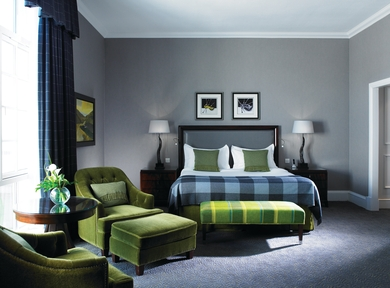
An Executive Suite

The resort has 211 bedrooms including 17 suites and 2 external manor homes. The conference centre has twelve meeting rooms, a ballroom, and a cinema. The 15,000-square-foot (1,400 m^{2}) meeting space can cater for 12 to 600 people. The largest function room, the Robert Burns Ballroom, is 6,179 sq ft (574.0 m^{2}).

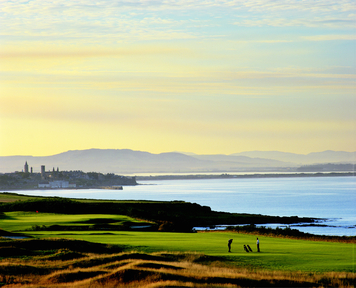
View from the Torrance course

The Torrance Course is a par 72, 7,230 yard long championship course, originally designed by golfer Gene Sarazen and former European Ryder Cup Captain Sam Torrance. In 2009 the course was redesigned to include eight new holes, in preparation for the 2009 Scottish Seniors Open and was also the Final Qualifying Venue for the 2010 Open Golf Championship. In August 2010, the World Deaf Golf Championships and the Scottish Seniors Open 2010 were held on the Torrance. The course features classic Scottish riveted bunkering throughout and is of a Scottish style Links design. In 2021 and 2022, the course hosted the Hero Open tournament.

The Kittocks Course is 7,192 yard long and is a par 72. Its original architects were Gene Sarazen and Bruce Devlin which is why it was formerly known as the Devlin Course 2012. The name Kittocks is taken from the SSSI (Site of Special Scientific Interest) area of land on the course which is inhabited by a family of deer.

A 9,000-square-foot (840 m^{2}) health spa is situated on the ground floor of the hotel. The spa includes a 16-metre indoor pool, sauna, steam room, Jacuzzi, and ten treatment rooms offering ESPA and Ishga therapies using Hebridean seaweed skincare. The health club features Life Fitness equipment and personal training services.

The hotel is located on the Fife Coastal Path, a 116-mile (187 km) long-distance walking route, and provides guests with access to bicycles for exploring local trails, including routes to Rock and Spindle and Lade Braes Walk.

== Controversy ==
In 2024, articles were published in the student-run Saint newspaper and subsequently the Sunday Times, chronicling many allegations of sexual and racial harassment by upper management at the hotel.
