= 2024 Open Championship =

Golf tournament

152nd Open Championship

Tournament information
- Dates: 18–21 July 2024
- Location: Troon, South Ayrshire, Scotland; 55°31′59″N 4°39′10″W
- Courses: Royal Troon Golf Club; Old Course
- Organized by: The R&A
- Tours: DP World Tour; PGA Tour; Japan Golf Tour

Statistics
- Par: 71
- Length: 7,385 yd (6,753 m)
- Field: 157 players, 80 after cut
- Cut: 148 (+6)
- Prize fund: $17,000,000
- Winner's share: $3,100,000

Champion
- (United States) Xander Schauffele
- 275 (−9)
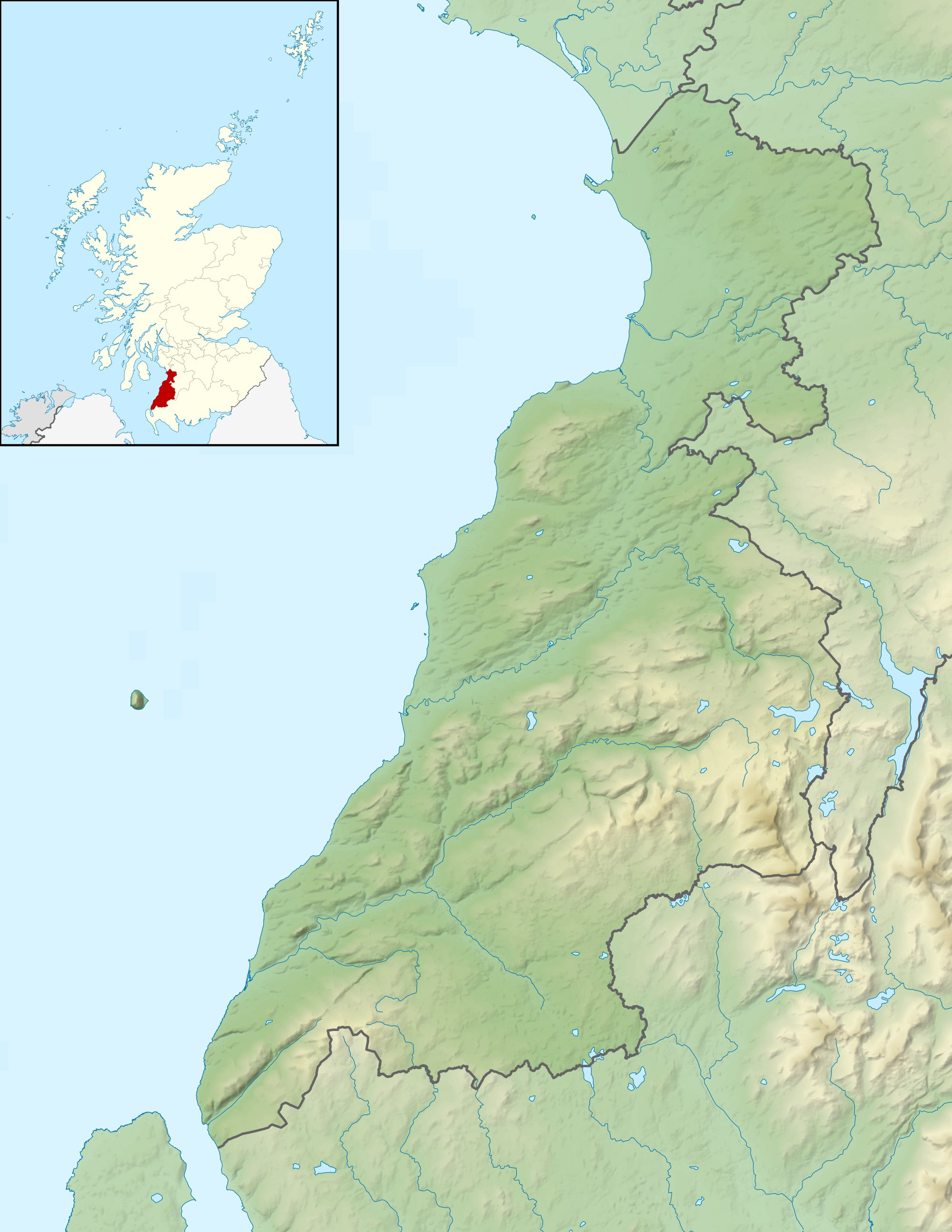
- Location in Scotland Location in South Ayrshire, Scotland

The 2024 Open Championship, officially the 152nd Open Championship, was a major golf tournament held 18–21 July 2024 at Royal Troon Golf Club in Troon, South Ayrshire, Scotland. It was the tenth Open Championship played at the Old Course of Troon. Xander Schauffele shot a final-round 65 to win his second major championship, two strokes ahead of Justin Rose and 54-hole leader Billy Horschel. With Schauffele's win, Americans won all four majors in the same calendar year for the eleventh time and the first time in 42 years.

== Organisation ==
The 2024 Open Championship was organised by the R&A, and was included in the PGA Tour, European Tour, and Japan Golf Tour calendars under the major championships category. The tournament was a 72-hole (4 rounds) stroke play competition held over four days, with 18 holes played each day. Play was in groups of three for the first two days, and groups of two in the final two days. Groupings for the first two days were decided by the organizers, with each group having one morning and one afternoon tee time. On the final two days, players teed off in reverse order of aggregate score, with the leaders last. After 36 holes there was a cut, after which the top 70 and ties progressed through to compete in the third and fourth rounds. In the event of a tie for the lowest score after four rounds, a four-hole aggregate playoff would be held to determine the winner; followed by sudden-death extra holes if necessary.

== Venue ==
The 2024 event was the 11th Open Championship (tenth for men) played at Royal Troon. The most recent was in 2020, when The R&A only staged the Women's Open Championship (both Open Championships for men were not held in 2020). Sophia Popov scored a major upset in winning her only major by two strokes. The previous men's Open was in 2016, where Henrik Stenson won the event by three strokes for his only major title.

== Course yardage ==
Hole	1	2	3	4	5	6	7	8	9	Out	10	11	12	13	14	15	16	17	18	In	Total
Yards	366	389	376	599	220	623; 601	403	123	440	3,539; 3,517	450	498	451	473	200	502	572	242	458	3,846	7,385; 7,363
Par	4	4	4	5	3	5	4	3	4	36	4	4	4	4	3	4	5	3	4	35	71

Length of course for previous Open Championships:

- 2016: 7,190 yards (6,570 m), par 71
- 2004: 7,175 yards (6,561 m), par 71
- 1997: 7,079 yards (6,473 m), par 71
- 1989: 7,097 yards (6,489 m), par 72
- 1982: 7,067 yards (6,462 m), par 72
- 1973: 7,064 yards (6,459 m), par 72
- 1962: 7,045 yards (6,442 m), par 72
- 1950: 6,583 yards (6,019 m), par 70
- 1923: 6,415 yards (5,866 m)

Open Championships from 1962 through 1989 played the 11th hole as a par-5.

Yardage by round

Round	Hole	1	2	3	4	5	6	7	8	9	Out	10	11	12	13	14	15	16	17	18	In	Total
Round	Par	4	4	4	5	3	5	4	3	4	36	4	4	4	4	3	4	5	3	4	35	71
1st	Yards	364	383	371	597	217	620	399	120	439	3,510	447	496	450	470	197	498	565	238	452	3,813	7,323
2nd	Yards	366	376	381	598	215	603	394	120	436	3,489	450	488	452	473	197	502	564	235	447	3,808	7,297
3rd	Yards	352	382	376	594	212	613	401	130	443	3,503	438	504	451	478	200	502	567	238	453	3,831	7,334
Final	Yards	352	386	372	608	218	623	409	100	430	3,498	454	493	456	480	201	495	559	244	459	3,841	7,339

== Field ==
The Open Championship field is made up of 157 players, who gained entry through various exemption criteria and qualifying tournaments. The criteria included past Open champions, recent major winners, top ranked players in the world rankings and from the leading world tours, and winners and high finishers from various designated tournaments, including the Open Qualifying Series; the winners of designated amateur events, including The Amateur Championship and U.S. Amateur, also gained exemption provided they remain an amateur. Anyone not qualifying via exemption, and had a handicap of 0.4 or lower, can gain entry through regional and final qualifying events.

Most exemption criteria remained unchanged from previous years. The previous Order of Merit exemptions for the Asian Tour, Japan Golf Tour, PGA Tour of Australasia, and Sunshine Tour were replaced by a category based on the Official World Golf Ranking's International Federation Ranking List, and a new exemption was added for the winner of the Africa Amateur Championship; it was also announced that winners of the 2024 Open and future editions will remain exempt through age 55, instead of through age 60 as with previous winners.

== Round summaries ==
=== First round ===
Thursday, 18 July 2024

Dan Brown, making his major championship debut after earning a place in the field through final qualifying, claimed the first-round lead following a bogey-free 65. Ranked 272nd in the Official World Golf Ranking, Brown had made only one cut in his last eight tournaments prior to the Open.

Shane Lowry, winner of the 2019 Open Championship, was in second place, and two-time major champion Justin Thomas was in third.

The scoring average was 74.43, more than three strokes over par, and only 17 players broke par on the round as wind and rain created difficult playing conditions.

Place	Player	Score	To par
1	(England) Dan Brown	65	−6
2	(Republic of Ireland) Shane Lowry	66	−5
3	(United States) Justin Thomas	68	−3
T4	(England) Joe Dean	69	−2
T4	(United States) Russell Henley	69	−2
T4	(Denmark) Nicolai Højgaard	69	−2
T4	(Canada) Mackenzie Hughes	69	−2
T4	(Sweden) Alex Norén	69	−2
T4	(England) Justin Rose	69	−2
T4	(United States) Xander Schauffele	69	−2

=== Second round ===
Friday, 19 July 2024

Shane Lowry shot a 2-under 69 to take the lead headed into the weekend. Overnight leader Dan Brown carded a 72 to slide into a tie for second alongside former world number one Justin Rose, who shot 68, the joint-lowest round of the day. Rose was the only player in the early-late tee time groupings to be under par through two rounds, as his side of the draw faced more difficult scoring conditions.

World number one Scottie Scheffler, seeking his seventh win of the season, moved into a share of fourth alongside Dean Burmester and Billy Horschel following a second consecutive 1-under round of 70.

Joaquín Niemann made a quintuple-bogey 8 at the par-3 8th hole, but bounced back with a 31 on the back nine to post 71 and remain at even par for the championship, seven strokes off the lead.

The cut came at 148 (six over par). Five of the top ten players in the Official World Golf Ranking failed to make the weekend: Rory McIlroy (no. 2), Ludvig Åberg (no. 4), Wyndham Clark (no. 5), Viktor Hovland (no. 7), and Bryson DeChambeau (no. 9). Among those who also missed the cut were Henrik Stenson, winner of the Open when it was last hosted at Royal Troon in 2016, and three-time Open champion Tiger Woods.

The scoring average was again more than three strokes over par, at 74.36, as wind gusts reached 30 miles per hour (48 km/h) during the round.

Place	Player	Score	To par
1	(Republic of Ireland) Shane Lowry	66-69=135	−7
T2	(England) Dan Brown	65-72=137	−5
T2	(England) Justin Rose	69-68=137	−5
T4	(South Africa) Dean Burmester	71-69=140	−2
T4	(United States) Billy Horschel	72-68=140	−2
T4	(United States) Scottie Scheffler	70-70=140	−2
T7	(United States) Patrick Cantlay	73-68=141	−1
T7	(Canada) Corey Conners	71-70=141	−1
T7	(Australia) Jason Day	73-68=141	−1
T7	(United States) Xander Schauffele	69-72=141	−1

=== Third round ===
Saturday, 20 July 2024

Billy Horschel established a 54-hole lead in a major championship for the first time in his career with a 2-under 69. Horschel and Xander Schauffele, winner of the 2024 PGA Championship, were the only players from the final 12 groupings to shoot under par in the third round, as weather conditions worsened throughout the day. The scoring average for the final 12 groupings was 73.92, compared to 71.46 for the prior 12 groupings.

Teeing off earlier in the day when the weather was sunny and calm, Thriston Lawrence and Sam Burns shot rounds of 65 to vault into contention. Russell Henley also moved into a six-way tie for second following a 66.

36-hole leader Shane Lowry carded a 6-over 77 to fall into ninth place, while Dan Brown double bogeyed his final hole to post 73. Scottie Scheffler shot even-par 71 to remain in contention. In an interview after his round, Scheffler described the back nine, with its cold, rainy, and windy conditions, as "probably the hardest nine holes that I'll ever play."

As one of the early players on the course, Kim Si-woo made a hole-in-one at the par-3 17th hole. This was the first ace made in championship history at that hole, and at 238 yards (218 m) it became the longest hole-in-one in the recorded history of the Open championship.

Place	Player	Score	To par
1	(United States) Billy Horschel	72-68-69=209	−4
T2	(England) Dan Brown	65-72-73=210	−3
T2	(United States) Sam Burns	76-69-65=210	−3
T2	(United States) Russell Henley	69-75-66=210	−3
T2	(South Africa) Thriston Lawrence	71-74-65=210	−3
T2	(England) Justin Rose	69-68-73=210	−3
T2	(United States) Xander Schauffele	69-72-69=210	−3
8	(United States) Scottie Scheffler	70-70-71=211	−2
9	(Republic of Ireland) Shane Lowry	66-69-77=212	−1
T10	(England) Matthew Jordan	71-71-71=213	E
T10	(Australia) Adam Scott	70-77-66=213	E
T10	(United States) Justin Thomas	68-78-67=213	E

=== Final round ===
Sunday, 21 July 2024

Xander Schauffele shot the lowest round of the day, a bogey-free 65, to post a winning score of 9-under 275 and win the Claret Jug. This was his second major championship of the year, making him the first since Brooks Koepka in 2018 to win two majors in a calendar year.

Playing alongside Schauffele, Justin Rose shot 67 to finish as runner-up at 7-under. 54-hole leader Billy Horschel birdied the final three holes to tie Rose in second place. Thriston Lawrence made four birdies and no bogeys on the front nine to hold the solo lead at 7-under, before faltering with a 1-over 36 on the back nine to finish fourth. World number one and pre-tournament favourite Scottie Scheffler was at 4-under for the tournament after eight holes, but four-putted for double bogey on the 9th hole, fell out of contention, and finished eight strokes back.

Of the twelve amateurs, four made the cut. Calum Scott, from Nairn in the Highlands of Scotland, won the Silver Medal as low amateur with a score of 8-over 292.

==== Final leaderboard ====
Champion
Silver Medal winner (low amateur)
(a) = amateur
(c) = past champion

Place	Player	Score	To par	Money ($)
1	(United States) Xander Schauffele	69-72-69-65=275	−9	3,100,000
T2	(United States) Billy Horschel	72-68-69-68=277	−7	1,443,500
T2	(England) Justin Rose	69-68-73-67=277	−7	1,443,500
4	(South Africa) Thriston Lawrence	71-74-65-68=278	−6	876,000
5	(United States) Russell Henley	69-75-66-69=279	−5	705,000
6	(Republic of Ireland) Shane Lowry (c)	66-69-77-68=280	−4	611,000
T7	(South Korea) Im Sung-jae	76-72-66-69=283	−1	451,833
T7	(Spain) Jon Rahm	73-70-72-68=283	−1	451,833
T7	(United States) Scottie Scheffler	70-70-71-72=283	−1	451,833
T10	(England) Dan Brown	65-72-73-74=284	E	317,533
T10	(England) Matthew Jordan	71-71-71-71=284	E	317,533
T10	(Australia) Adam Scott	70-77-66-71=284	E	317,533

Leaderboard below the top 10
Place	Player	Score	To par	Money ($)
T13	(South Korea) An Byeong-hun	75-71-68-71=285	+1	248,667
T13	(Australia) Jason Day	73-68-76-68=285	+1	248,667
T13	(Sweden) Alex Norén	69-75-71-70=285	+1	248,667
T16	(United States) John Catlin	76-70-69-71=286	+2	202,700
T16	(Canada) Mackenzie Hughes	69-74-75-68=286	+2	202,700
T16	(United States) Collin Morikawa (c)	73-70-72-71=286	+2	202,700
T19	(South Africa) Dean Burmester	71-69-76-71=287	+3	176,367
T19	(New Zealand) Daniel Hillier	76-71-68-72=287	+3	176,367
T19	(India) Shubhankar Sharma	76-72-67-72=287	+3	176,367
T22	(Scotland) Ewen Ferguson	74-73-70-71=288	+4	151,067
T22	(Republic of Ireland) Pádraig Harrington (c)	72-73-71-72=288	+4	151,067
T22	(Austria) Sepp Straka	70-74-73-71=288	+4	151,067
T25	(England) Laurie Canter	71-74-70-74=289	+5	124,583
T25	(United States) Patrick Cantlay	73-68-75-73=289	+5	124,583
T25	(Canada) Corey Conners	71-70-80-68=289	+5	124,583
T25	(England) Joe Dean	69-77-71-72=289	+5	124,583
T25	(New Zealand) Ryan Fox	73-73-76-67=289	+5	124,583
T25	(United States) Jordan Spieth (c)	71-74-74-70=289	+5	124,583
T31	(United States) Sam Burns	76-69-65-80=290	+6	90,220
T31	(United States) Eric Cole	72-73-72-73=290	+6	90,220
T31	(United States) Dustin Johnson	74-69-72-75=290	+6	90,220
T31	(South Korea) Kim Min-kyu	73-71-72-74=290	+6	90,220
T31	(United States) Chris Kirk	70-76-69-75=290	+6	90,220
T31	(Italy) Matteo Manassero	73-73-70-74=290	+6	90,220
T31	(Italy) Guido Migliozzi	73-75-71-71=290	+6	90,220
T31	(United States) Justin Thomas	68-78-67-77=290	+6	90,220
T31	(United States) Brendon Todd	73-73-70-74=290	+6	90,220
T31	(United States) Cameron Young	73-73-71-73=290	+6	90,220
T41	(United States) Kurt Kitayama	77-69-74-71=291	+7	70,050
T41	(England) Matt Wallace	70-77-71-73=291	+7	70,050
T43	(Spain) Jorge Campillo	80-68-73-71=292	+8	57,200
T43	(Argentina) Emiliano Grillo	71-74-72-75=292	+8	57,200
T43	(United States) Max Homa	76-72-70-74=292	+8	57,200
T43	(South Korea) Kim Si-woo	76-71-71-74=292	+8	57,200
T43	(United States) Brooks Koepka	70-73-78-71=292	+8	57,200
T43	(Denmark) Thorbjørn Olesen	72-73-76-71=292	+8	57,200
T43	(Scotland) Calum Scott (a)	71-75-70-76=292	+8	0
T50	(United States) Sean Crocker	72-74-69-78=293	+9	45,238
T50	(United States) Harris English	76-71-72-74=293	+9	45,238
T50	(England) Matt Fitzpatrick	70-78-73-72=293	+9	45,238
T50	(Scotland) Robert MacIntyre	72-75-72-74=293	+9	45,238
T50	(England) Richard Mansell	75-71-74-73=293	+9	45,238
T50	(Poland) Adrian Meronk	73-72-73-75=293	+9	45,238
T50	(France) Matthieu Pavon	72-72-77-72=293	+9	45,238
T50	(United States) Gary Woodland	76-68-72-77=293	+9	45,238
T58	(Mexico) Abraham Ancer	73-75-70-76=294	+10	42,150
T58	(Chile) Joaquín Niemann	71-71-76-76=294	+10	42,150
T60	(United States) Brian Harman (c)	73-73-72-77=295	+11	41,325
T60	(Denmark) Rasmus Højgaard	74-72-74-75=295	+11	41,325
T60	(United States) Phil Mickelson (c)	73-74-72-76=295	+11	41,325
T60	(United States) Tommy Morrison (a)	75-73-74-73=295	+11	0
T60	(Denmark) Jacob Skov Olesen (a)	76-71-72-76=295	+11	0
T60	(South Korea) Wang Jeung-hun	72-72-77-74=295	+11	41,325
T66	(United States) Austin Eckroat	73-73-72-78=296	+12	40,280
T66	(Denmark) Nicolai Højgaard	69-75-75-77=296	+12	40,280
T66	(Japan) Hideki Matsuyama	75-72-75-74=296	+12	40,280
T66	(Northern Ireland) Tom McKibbin	73-72-77-74=296	+12	40,280
T66	(United States) Davis Thompson	74-73-71-78=296	+12	40,280
71	(United States) Rickie Fowler	79-69-74-75=297	+13	39,700
T72	(United States) Tom Hoge	74-70-74-80=298	+14	39,233
T72	(Germany) Marcel Siem	73-71-77-77=298	+14	39,233
T72	(South Korea) Song Young-han	71-76-77-74=298	+14	39,233
T75	(Germany) Alex Čejka	73-74-72-80=299	+15	38,525
T75	(Northern Ireland) Darren Clarke (c)	77-71-76-75=299	+15	38,525
T75	(England) Aaron Rai	73-74-75-77=299	+15	38,525
78	(Spain) Luis Masaveu (a)	73-75-78-76=302	+18	0
79	(United States) Andy Ogletree	75-72-79-77=303	+19	38,400
80	(South Africa) Darren Fichardt	77-71-80-78=306	+22	38,275
CUT	(South Africa) Christiaan Bezuidenhout	75-74=149	+7	
CUT	(United States) Akshay Bhatia	76-73=149	+7	
CUT	(United States) Keegan Bradley	74-75=149	+7	
CUT	(Spain) Nacho Elvira	76-73=149	+7	
CUT	(Japan) Yuto Katsuragawa	76-73=149	+7	
CUT	(New Zealand) Kazuma Kobori	73-76=149	+7	
CUT	(Scotland) Jack McDonald	76-73=149	+7	
CUT	(Sweden) Vincent Norrman	78-71=149	+7	
CUT	(France) Victor Perez	74-75=149	+7	
CUT	(Finland) Sami Välimäki	73-76=149	+7	
CUT	(United States) Will Zalatoris	76-73=149	+7	
CUT	(England) Tyrrell Hatton	73-77=150	+8	
CUT	(England) Sam Horsfield	75-75=150	+8	
CUT	(Japan) Masahiro Kawamura	72-78=150	+8	
CUT	(Sweden) Charlie Lindh	75-75=150	+8	
CUT	(South Africa) Louis Oosthuizen (c)	78-72=150	+8	
CUT	(United States) J. T. Poston	78-72=150	+8	
CUT	(Sweden) Henrik Stenson (c)	77-73=150	+8	
CUT	(Canada) Nick Taylor	75-75=150	+8	
CUT	(Sweden) Ludvig Åberg	75-76=151	+9	
CUT	(United States) Bryson DeChambeau	76-75=151	+9	
CUT	(England) Tommy Fleetwood	76-75=151	+9	
CUT	(Japan) Ryo Hisatsune	76-75=151	+9	
CUT	(United States) Zach Johnson (c)	76-75=151	+9	
CUT	(Australia) Min Woo Lee	71-80=151	+9	
CUT	(Netherlands) Joost Luiten	75-76=151	+9	
CUT	(United States) Denny McCarthy	73-78=151	+9	
CUT	(Italy) Francesco Molinari (c)	73-78=151	+9	
CUT	(Taiwan) Pan Cheng-tsung	79-72=151	+9	
CUT	(United States) Adam Schenk	74-77=151	+9	
CUT	(England) Jordan Smith	76-75=151	+9	
CUT	(Australia) Elvis Smylie	76-75=151	+9	
CUT	(England) Matthew Southgate	73-78=151	+9	
CUT	(England) Matthew Dodd-Berry (a)	72-80=152	+10	
CUT	(United States) Tony Finau	71-81=152	+10	
CUT	(Canada) Adam Hadwin	75-77=152	+10	
CUT	(New Zealand) Michael Hendry	74-78=152	+10	
CUT	(Japan) Rikuya Hoshino	79-73=152	+10	
CUT	(Norway) Viktor Hovland	75-77=152	+10	
CUT	(Japan) Ryosuke Kinoshita	75-77=152	+10	
CUT	(United States) Maverick McNealy	71-81=152	+10	
CUT	(United States) Taylor Moore	78-74=152	+10	
CUT	(Germany) Yannik Paul	77-75=152	+10	
CUT	(Australia) Jasper Stubbs (a)	80-72=152	+10	
CUT	(United States) Stewart Cink (c)	76-77=153	+11	
CUT	(United States) Ben Griffin	79-74=153	+11	
CUT	(Spain) Ángel Hidalgo	77-76=153	+11	
CUT	(Germany) Stephan Jäger	74-79=153	+11	
CUT	(South Korea) Tom Kim	76-77=153	+11	
CUT	(Northern Ireland) Rory McIlroy (c)	78-75=153	+11	
CUT	(Sweden) Jesper Svensson	72-81=153	+11	
CUT	(South Africa) Altin van der Merwe (a)	79-74=153	+11	
CUT	(Sweden) Alexander Björk	73-81=154	+12	
CUT	(England) Sam Hutsby	74-80=154	+12	
CUT	(Australia) Cameron Smith (c)	80-74=154	+12	
CUT	(England) Dominic Clemons (a)	77-78=155	+13	
CUT	(United States) Lucas Glover	77-78=155	+13	
CUT	(Spain) Jaime Montojo (a)	74-81=155	+13	
CUT	(Republic of Ireland) Liam Nolan (a)	78-77=155	+13	
CUT	(Spain) David Puig	80-75=155	+13	
CUT	(United States) Gordon Sargent (a)	80-75=155	+13	
CUT	(South Africa) Ryan van Velzen	79-76=155	+13	
CUT	(United States) Mason Andersen	76-80=156	+14	
CUT	(Mexico) Santiago de la Fuente (a)	78-78=156	+14	
CUT	(United States) Sahith Theegala	77-79=156	+14	
CUT	(United States) Tiger Woods (c)	79-77=156	+14	
CUT	(Thailand) Denwit Boriboonsub	78-80=158	+16	
CUT	(United States) Wyndham Clark	78-80=158	+16	
CUT	(United States) Justin Leonard (c)	80-78=158	+16	
CUT	(Japan) Keita Nakajima	80-79=159	+17	
CUT	(England) Dan Bradbury	83-77=160	+18	
CUT	(South Korea) Koh Gun-taek	81-79=160	+18	
CUT	(United States) Todd Hamilton (c)	82-80=162	+20	
CUT	(Japan) Aguri Iwasaki	74-91=165	+23	
WD	(United States) John Daly (c)	82		
WD	(South Africa) Ernie Els (c)	82		
WD	(France) Romain Langasque			

==== Scorecard ====
Hole	1	2	3	4	5	6	7	8	9	10	11	12	13	14	15	16	17	18
Par	4	4	4	5	3	5	4	3	4	4	4	4	4	3	4	5	3	4
(United States) Schauffele	−3	−3	−3	−3	−3	−4	−5	−5	−5	−5	−6	−6	−7	−8	−8	−9	−9	−9
(United States) Horschel	−5	−5	−4	−5	−5	−6	−6	−5	−5	−4	−4	−4	−4	−4	−4	−5	−6	−7
(England) Rose	−3	−4	−4	−5	−5	−5	−5	−6	−6	−6	−6	−5	−5	−5	−5	−6	−6	−7
(South Africa) Lawrence	−3	−3	−4	−5	−5	−5	−6	−6	−7	−7	−7	−6	−6	−6	−6	−6	−6	−6
(United States) Henley	−3	−3	−3	−3	−4	−4	−4	−4	−4	−4	−4	−4	−4	−4	−5	−5	−5	−5
(Republic of Ireland) Lowry	−1	−1	E	−1	−2	−2	−3	−4	−4	−4	−3	−3	−3	−3	−3	−3	−4	−4
(United States) Scheffler	−2	−2	−3	−3	−3	−2	−3	−4	−2	−2	−2	−2	−2	−2	−2	−3	−3	−1
(England) Brown	−2	−3	−3	−2	−1	E	−1	E	E	E	E	E	E	E	−1	−1	−1	E
(United States) Burns	−3	−3	−2	−1	−2	−2	−1	−2	−2	−1	+1	+4	+4	+4	+5	+5	+6	+6

Cumulative tournament scores, relative to par

Birdie	Bogey	Double bogey	Triple bogey+
