= 2020 Women's British Open =

44th Women's British Open

2020 AIG Women's Open

Tournament information
- Dates: 20–23 August 2020
- Location: Troon, South Ayrshire, Scotland; 55.532°N 4.65°W
- Course: Royal Troon Golf Club
- Organized by: The R&A
- Tours: Ladies European Tour; LPGA Tour

Statistics
- Par: 71
- Length: 6,632 yards (6,064 m)
- Field: 144 players, 74 after cut
- Cut: 151 (+9)
- Prize fund: US$4.5 million
- Winner's share: $675,000

Champion
- (Germany) Sophia Popov
- 277 (−7)
- Location in the United Kingdom Location in Scotland

The 2020 Women's British Open was played from 20 to 23 August in Scotland at Royal Troon Golf Club. It was the 44th Women's British Open, the 20th as a major championship on the LPGA Tour, and the first at Royal Troon Golf Club. The tournament was played behind closed doors due to the COVID-19 pandemic in the United Kingdom. It was the first championship held under a renewed sponsorship agreement with AIG; the deal involved the rebranding of the championship, removing the word "British", with the event titled as the 2020 AIG Women's Open.

The championship was won by world number 304 Sophia Popov, by two strokes from Thidapa Suwannapura. It was her first major tournament victory. Popov, a professional since 2014 and member of the second-tier Symetra Tour since 2016, had never previously won on any of the major tours, winning her first events on a mini-tour in Arizona earlier in 2020. She qualified for the Women's Open by means of a high finish at the LPGA Tour's Marathon Classic at the start of August.

== Course layout ==
Overall, this was the 10th Open Championship to be held at Royal Troon, but the first for women.

Hole	Name	Yards	Par	Hole	Name	Yards	Par
1	Seal	357	4	10	Sandhills	385	4
2	Black Rock	381	4	11	The Railway	421	4
3	Gyaws	371	4	12	The Fox	427	4
4	Dunure	522	5	13	Burmah	411	4
5	Greenan	194	3	14	Alton	175	3
6	Turnberry	544	5	15	Crosbie	436	4
7	Tel-el-Kebir	381	4	16	Well	533	5
8	Postage Stamp	123	3	17	Rabbit	210	3
9	The Monk	387	4	18	Craigend	374	4
Out		3,260	36	In		3,372	35
Source:				Total		6,632	71

Length of course for previous Open Championships:

- 2016: 7,190 yards (6,570 m), par 71
- 2004: 7,175 yards (6,561 m), par 71
- 1997: 7,079 yards (6,473 m), par 71
- 1989: 7,097 yards (6,489 m), par 72
- 1982: 7,067 yards (6,462 m), par 72

- 1973: 7,064 yards (6,459 m), par 72
- 1962: 7,045 yards (6,442 m), par 72
- 1950: 6,583 yards (6,019 m), par 70
- 1923: 6,415 yards (5,866 m)

Open Championships from 1962 through 1989 played the 11th hole as a par-5.

== Field ==
The field is 144 players. Most players earn exemptions based on past performance on the Ladies European Tour, the LPGA Tour, previous major championships, or with a high ranking in the Women's World Golf Rankings, with the rest of the field normally gaining entry by successfully competing in qualifying tournaments open to any female golfer, professional or amateur, with a low handicap. In 2020 there were no such tournaments due to the COVID-19 pandemic.

Qualification criteria for the 2020 Women's British Open were as follows:

1. Winners of the Women's British Open, aged 60 or younger at the scheduled end of the championship, provided they are still active members of a recognised tour.

2. The top 10 finishers and ties from the 2019 Women's British Open.

3. The top 15 on the final 2019 LET Order of Merit.

4. The top 5 on the 2020 LET Order of Merit not already exempt as of 29 June.

5. The top 30 on the final 2019 LPGA Money List.

6. The top 35 on the 2020 LPGA Prioity List not already exempt under criteria 5. as of 29 June.

7. The top 5 on the 2020 LPGA Money List not already exempt as of 29 June.

8. The top 30 in the Women's World Golf Rankings as of 16 March.

9. Winners of the 2019 JLPGA Money List.

10. The top 5 on the final 2019 JLPGA Money List not already exempt.

11. Winners of the 2019 KLPGA Money List.

10. The top 5 on the 2020 KLPGA Money List not already exempt as of 29 June.

12. Winners of any recognised LET or LPGA Tour events in the 2020 calendar year.

13. Winners of the last five editions of the U.S. Women's Open

14. Winners of the last five editions of the ANA Inspiration

15. Winners of the last five editions of the Women's PGA Championship

16. Winners of the last five editions of The Evian Championship

17. The leading five (not otherwise exempt) in the 2020 Marathon Classic

18. The leading three (not otherwise exempt) in the 2020 Aberdeen Standard Investments Ladies Scottish Open

19. The 2020 Women's Amateur Asia-Pacific champion, 2020 Women's Amateur Championship champion, 2019 U.S. Women's Amateur champion, 2020 European Ladies Amateur Championship champion, the 2019 Mark H. McCormack Medal winner, and the highest ranked women in the World Amateur Golf Ranking from Great Britain and Ireland as of week 25, and provided they are still amateurs at the time of the Championship.

20. Any player who did not compete in the previous year's Women's British Open due to maternity, who subsequently received an extension of membership for the maternity from the player's home tour in the previous year, provided she was otherwise qualified to compete in the previous year's Women's British Open.

21. Remaining places filled by players not already exempt from:

a) the 2020 Aberdeen Standard Investments Ladies Scottish Open

i) in finishing order for those making the cut, with ties determined by order of Rolex Ranking prior to the start of the tournament, then card playoff.
ii) in order of Rolex Ranking prior to the start of the tournament for those not making the cut.

b) the Rolex Rankings as of 16 March.

== Round summaries ==
=== First round ===
Thursday, 20 August 2020

American Amy Olson held a three stroke lead at the end of the first round after recording a 4 under par round of 67. In tough scoring conditions due to strong winds, Marina Alex and Sophia Popov were the only other two other players to finish under par. Ten players returned even par rounds to lie a stroke further back, including 2009 champion Catriona Matthew and two-time LPGA major winner Anna Nordqvist.

Place	Player	Score	To par
1	(United States) Amy Olson	67	−4
T2	(United States) Marina Alex	70	−1
T2	(Germany) Sophia Popov	70	−1
T4	(Sweden) Daniela Holmqvist	71	E
T4	(Spain) Nuria Iturrioz	71	E
T4	(Mexico) Gaby López	71	E
T4	(Scotland) Catriona Matthew	71	E
T4	(Sweden) Anna Nordqvist	71	E
T4	(South Africa) Lee-Anne Pace	71	E
T4	(Denmark) Emily Kristine Pedersen	71	E
T4	(Canada) Alena Sharp	71	E
T4	(Thailand) Thidapa Suwannapura	71	E
T4	(United States) Lindsey Weaver	71	E

=== Second round ===
Friday, 21 August 2020

Windy conditions continued throughout the second round which made for difficult scoring again. Daniela Holmqvist took a one stroke lead at the halfway stage following a one under par round of 70; by the end of the day she was the only player in the field under par. In joint second, at even par, were Austin Ernst and Sophia Popov after rounds of 70 and 72 respectively. The best rounds of the day (69, two under par) came from Minjee Lee, who climbed into a tie for fourth at one over par, and Inbee Park, who finished in a tie for 17th place at four over par. First round leader Amy Olson was one of many who struggled, returning a ten over par round of 81 to fall back into a tie for 33rd place.

The cut came at nine over par. Among those to miss the cut were the defending champion from 2019, Hinako Shibuno; 2017 champion In-Kyung Kim; 2013 champion Stacy Lewis, who had won the Ladies Scottish Open the previous week; and Rose Ladies Series champion Charley Hull.

Place	Player	Score	To par
1	(Sweden) Daniela Holmqvist	71-70=141	−1
T2	(United States) Austin Ernst	72-70=142	E
T2	(Germany) Sophia Popov	70-72=142	E
T4	(New Zealand) Lydia Ko	72-71=143	+1
T4	(Australia) Minjee Lee	74-69=143	+1
T4	(Denmark) Emily Kristine Pedersen	71-72=143	+1
T4	(Thailand) Thidapa Suwannapura	71-72=143	+1
T4	(United States) Lindsey Weaver	71-72=143	+1
T9	(United States) Nelly Korda	72-72=144	+2
T9	(Japan) Haru Nomura	74-70=144	+2

=== Third round ===
Saturday, 22 August 2020

Sophia Popov moved into a three stroke lead at four under par after returning the joint best score of the day, a four under par round of 67. Also with 67 was Katherine Kirk, who climbed into a tie for tenth place, seven strokes behind Popov. Tied for second at one under par were Minjee Lee and Thidapa Suwannapura, both recording two under par rounds of 69 on Saturday. Further back, three players were tied at one over par, and three more at two over par. Daniela Holmqvist, who had held the lead at the halfway stage dropped down the leaderboard into a tie for 21st place after a six over par round of 77.

Place	Player	Score	To par
1	(Germany) Sophia Popov	70-72-67=209	−4
T2	(Australia) Minjee Lee	74-69-69=212	−1
T2	(Thailand) Thidapa Suwannapura	71-72-69=212	−1
T4	(United States) Austin Ernst	72-70-72=214	+1
T4	(Germany) Caroline Masson	72-74-68=214	+1
T4	(United States) Lindsey Weaver	71-72-71=214	+1
T7	(United States) Kristen Gillman	75-72-68=215	+2
T7	(New Zealand) Lydia Ko	72-71-72=215	+2
T7	(Denmark) Emily Kristine Pedersen	71-72-72=215	+2
T10	(United States) Cydney Clanton	74-73-69=216	+3
T10	(Australia) Katherine Kirk	72-77-67=216	+3
T10	(United States) Jennifer Song	74-74-68=216	+3

=== Final round ===
Sunday, 23 August 2020

After a bogey on the opening hole, overnight leader Sophia Popov bounced back with three birdies in the next five holes to retain the lead going into the final nine holes. Her nearest challenger was Thidapa Suwannapura, who birdied four holes in a row from the fourth to get within one stroke, with Minjee Lee a further two strokes behind. Bogeys by Suwannapura on the 11th and 13th holes extended Popov's lead to three strokes, and when Popov birdied both the 15th and 16th holes she led by four with just two holes to play. Popov bogeyed the last to finish two strokes ahead of Suwannapura and four clear of Lee.

2015 champion Inbee Park returned the joint lowest round of the day, and the championship, with a five under par round of 66 to climb up to fourth place at one under par. Also with a round of 66 was Ally McDonald, who finished tied for 22nd place at six over par. Lindsey Weaver, who had been in a tie for fourth place after each of the opening three rounds and had chosen to play without a caddie as a result of COVID-19 related restrictions, fell away on Sunday with a four over par round of 75 to finish tied for 19th place.

Place	Player	Score	To par	Prize money (US$)
1	(Germany) Sophia Popov	70-72-67-68=277	−7	675,000
2	(Thailand) Thidapa Suwannapura	71-72-69-67=279	−5	407,926
3	(Australia) Minjee Lee	74-69-69-69=281	−3	295,468
4	(South Korea) Inbee Park	77-69-71-66=283	−1	228,194
5	(United States) Austin Ernst	72-70-72-70=284	E	183,349
6	(Japan) Momoko Ueda	75-75-68-67=285	+1	149,712
T7	(South Korea) Chun In-gee	72-75-70-69=286	+2	105,426
T7	(United States) Andrea Lee	74-73-70-69=286	+2	105,426
T7	(Germany) Caroline Masson	72-74-68-72=286	+2	105,426
T7	(United States) Jennifer Song	74-74-68-70=286	+2	105,426

==== Scorecard ====
Final round

Hole	1	2	3	4	5	6	7	8	9	10	11	12	13	14	15	16	17	18
Par	4	4	4	5	3	5	4	3	4	4	4	4	4	3	4	5	3	4
(Germany) Popov	−3	−4	−5	−5	−5	−6	−6	−6	−6	−6	−6	−6	−6	−6	−7	−8	−8	−7
(Thailand) Suwannapura	−1	−1	−1	−2	−3	−4	−5	−5	−5	−5	−4	−4	−3	−3	−3	−4	−5	−5
(Australia) Lee	−1	−1	−1	−1	−2	−3	−3	−3	−3	−3	−3	−3	−3	−3	−3	−4	−4	−3
(South Korea) Park	+3	+4	+4	+4	+3	+2	+1	E	E	E	E	+1	E	E	E	E	−1	−1
(United States) Ernst	+1	+1	+2	+1	+1	E	E	E	E	−1	E	E	E	+1	+1	+1	E	E
(Japan) Ueda	+5	+4	+3	+2	+2	+2	+2	+1	+1	+1	+1	+1	+1	+1	+1	+1	+1	+1
(South Korea) Chun	+4	+4	+4	+4	+4	+3	+3	+3	+3	+3	+4	+4	+4	+4	+4	+3	+3	+2
(United States) Lee	+5	+5	+5	+5	+5	+4	+3	+3	+3	+3	+3	+3	+4	+3	+3	+2	+2	+2
(Germany) Masson	+1	+1	+1	+1	+1	E	−1	E	E	E	E	+1	+1	+1	+1	+1	+1	+2
(United States) Song	+3	+3	+3	+2	+1	+1	+2	+1	+2	+2	+2	+2	+2	+2	+2	+2	+2	+2

Cumulative tournament scores, relative to par

Eagle	Birdie	Bogey	Double bogey
