= 2004 Open Championship =

Coordinates: 55.532°N 4.651°W

Tournament information
- Dates: 15–18 July 2004
- Location: Troon, South Ayrshire, Scotland
- Course(s): Royal Troon Golf Club, Old Course
- Tour(s): European Tour; PGA Tour; Japan Golf Tour

Statistics
- Par: 71
- Length: 7,175 yards (6,561 m)
- Field: 156 players, 73 after cut
- Cut: 145 (+3)
- Prize fund: £4,000,000 €6,001,690 $7,490,400
- Winner's share: £720,000 €1,078,430 $1,348,272

Champion
- (United States) Todd Hamilton
- 274 (−10), playoff

Location in Scotland
Location in South Ayrshire, Scotland

The 2004 Open Championship was a men's major golf championship and the 133rd Open Championship, held from 15 to 18 July at the Old Course of Royal Troon Golf Club in Troon, Scotland.

Todd Hamilton won his only major championship, defeating 2002 champion Ernie Els by a stroke in a four-hole playoff. Phil Mickelson finished third, followed by Lee Westwood in fourth. Hamilton was the sixth consecutive American to win at Royal Troon.

== History of The Open Championship at Royal Troon ==
Royal Troon first hosted The Open Championship in 1923 and the 2004 Open was its eighth. Royal Troon's list of champions includes Arthur Havers (1923), 4-time Open winner Bobby Locke (1950), 7-time major winner Arnold Palmer (1962), Tom Weiskopf (1973), 5-time Open champion Tom Watson (1982), Mark Calcavecchia (1989), and Justin Leonard (1997).

== Course ==
Old Course

Hole	Name	Yards	Par	Hole	Name	Yards	Par
1	Seal	370	4	10	Sandhills	438	4
2	Black Rock	391	4	11	The Railway	490	4
3	Gyaws	379	4	12	The Fox	431	4
4	Dunure	560	5	13	Burmah	472	4
5	Greenan	210	3	14	Alton	178	3
6	Turnberry	601	5	15	Crosbie	483	4
7	Tel-el-Kebir	405	4	16	Well	542	5
8	Postage Stamp	123	3	17	Rabbit	222	3
9	The Monk	423	4	18	Craigend	457	4
Out		3,462	36	In		3,713	35
				Total		7,175	71

Lengths of the course for previous Opens (since 1950):

- 1997: 7,079 yards (6,473 m), par 71
- 1989: 7,097 yards (6,489 m), par 72
- 1982: 7,067 yards (6,462 m), par 72
- 1973: 7,064 yards (6,459 m), par 72
- 1962: 7,045 yards (6,442 m), par 72
- 1950: 6,583 yards (6,019 m), par 70

Opens from 1962 through 1989 played the 11th hole as a par-5.

== Field ==
1. Top 10 and ties from the 2003 Open Championship

Thomas Bjørn (3,4), Ben Curtis (2,3), Brian Davis (4), Gary Evans, Nick Faldo (2), Sergio García (3), Retief Goosen (3,4,9,13,17), Freddie Jacobson (3,4), Davis Love III (3,12,13,17), Hennie Otto, Kenny Perry (3,13,17), Phillip Price (4), Vijay Singh (3,10,13,17), Tiger Woods (2,3,9,10,11,13,17)

2. Past Open Champions aged 65 or under on 18 July 2004

Mark Calcavecchia, John Daly, Ernie Els (3,4,13,17), Paul Lawrie, Tom Lehman, Justin Leonard (3,13,17), Sandy Lyle, Greg Norman, Mark O'Meara, Nick Price (3,13,17), Tom Weiskopf

- David Duval and Tom Watson (26) withdrew.
- Ian Baker-Finch, Seve Ballesteros, Tony Jacklin, Johnny Miller, Jack Nicklaus, Bill Rogers, and Lee Trevino did not enter.

3. The first 50 players on the OWGR on 27 May 2004

Robert Allenby (17), Stephen Ames, Stuart Appleby (13,17), Chad Campbell (13), Paul Casey (4), K. J. Choi (17), Stewart Cink, Darren Clarke (4), Chris DiMarco (13,17), Brad Faxon (13), Steve Flesch, Jim Furyk (9,13,17), Jay Haas (13,17), Todd Hamilton (23), Pádraig Harrington (4), Charles Howell III (13,17), John Huston, Trevor Immelman (4), Miguel Ángel Jiménez, Zach Johnson, Jonathan Kaye (13), Jerry Kelly (17), Stephen Leaney (4,17), Peter Lonard (4,17,19), Shigeki Maruyama, Shaun Micheel (11), Phil Mickelson (10,17), Craig Parry, Ian Poulter (4), Chris Riley, Adam Scott (4,12,17), David Toms (11,13,17), Bob Tway (13,21), Scott Verplank (13), Mike Weir (10,13,17)

- Fred Couples, Scott Hoch, and Kirk Triplett did not play.

4. Top 20 in the final 2003 European Tour Order of Merit

Michael Campbell, Alastair Forsyth, Ignacio Garrido (5), David Howell, Raphaël Jacquelin, Lee Westwood

5. The Volvo PGA Championship winners for 2002–04

Scott Drummond, Anders Hansen

6. First 3 players, not exempt, in the top 20 of the 2004 European Tour Order of Merit as of 27 May

Joakim Haeggman, Barry Lane, Graeme McDowell

7. First 2 European Tour members, not exempt, in a cumulative money list taken from all official European Tour events from the Deutsche Bank - SAP Open TPC of Europe up to and including the European Open and including the U.S. Open

Richard Green, Jean-François Remésy

8. The leading player, not exempt having applied (7) above, in each of the 2004 European Open and the 2004 Scottish Open

Thomas Levet, Peter O'Malley

9. The U.S. Open Champions for 2000–04

10. The Masters Champions for 2000–04

11. The PGA Champions for 1999–2003

Rich Beem

12. The Players Champions for 2002–04

Craig Perks

13. Top 20 in the final 2003 PGA Tour Official Money List

14. First 3 players, not exempt, in the top 20 of the 2004 PGA Tour Official Money List as of 27 May

15. First 2 PGA Tour members, not exempt, in a cumulative money list taken from the 2004 Players Championship and the five PGA Tour events leading up to and including the 2004 Western Open

Frank Lickliter, Rory Sabbatini

16. The leading player, not exempt having applied (15) above, in each of the 2004 Western Open and the 2004 John Deere Classic

Steve Lowery

- Mark Hensby did not play.

17. Playing members of the 2003 Presidents Cup teams

Tim Clark

- Fred Funk did not play.

18. Winner of the 2003 Asian PGA Tour Order of Merit

Arjun Atwal

19. Top 2 from the 2003 PGA Tour of Australasia Order of Merit

- Andre Stolz did not play.

20. Winner of the 2003–04 Sunshine Tour Order of Merit

Darren Fichardt

21. The 2003 Canadian Open Champion

22. The 2003 Japan Open Champion

Keiichiro Fukabori

23. Top 3 from the 2003 Japan Golf Tour Order of Merit

Tetsuji Hiratsuka

- Toshimitsu Izawa did not play.

24. The leading player, not exempt, in the 2004 Mizuno Open

- Hiroaki Iijima did not play.

25. First 4, not exempt having applied (24) above, in a cumulative money list taken from all official Japan Golf Tour events from the 2004 Japan PGA Championship up to and including the 2004 Mizuno Open

Dinesh Chand, Hidemasa Hoshino, Hur Suk-ho, Takashi Kamiyama

26. The 2003 Senior British Open Champion

27. The 2004 Amateur Champion

Stuart Wilson (a)

28. The 2003 U.S. Amateur Champion

Nick Flanagan (a)

29. The 2003 European Amateur Champion

Brian McElhinney (a)

International Final Qualifying
Africa – James Kingston, Grant Muller, Louis Oosthuizen, Tjaart van der Walt
Australasia – Andrew Buckle, Matthew Hazelden, Brendan Jones, Adam Le Vesconte, Paul Sheehan
Asia – Scott Barr, Kim Felton, Jyoti Randhawa, Yoshinobu Tsukada
America – Aaron Baddeley, Cameron Beckman, Glen Day, Luke Donald, Bob Estes, Mathew Goggin, Mathias Grönberg, Tim Herron, Skip Kendall, Hunter Mahan, Spike McRoy, Rod Pampling, Carl Pettersson, Bo Van Pelt
- Steve Elkington qualified but withdrew prior to the tournament.
Europe – Paul Broadhurst, Christian Cévaër, Nicolas Colsaerts, Gary Emerson, Klas Eriksson, Kenneth Ferrie, Mark Foster, Peter Hedblom, Maarten Lafeber, Euan Little, Paul McGinley, Colin Montgomerie, Mårten Olander, Eduardo Romero, Miles Tunnicliff, Simon Wakefield
- Warren Bennett qualified but withdrew prior to the tournament.

Local Final Qualifying (Saturday 10 July and Sunday 11 July)
Glasgow (Gailes) – Paul Bradshaw, Simon Dyson, Anthony Millar, Andrew Willey
Irvine – Jonathan Cheetham, Martin Erlandsson, Andrew Oldcorn, Sven Strüver
Turnberry Kintyre – Lloyd Campbell (a), Steven Tiley (a), Paul Wesselingh, Sean Whiffin
Western Gailes – Lewis Atkinson, Daniel Sugrue, Ben Willman

Alternates

- Jimmy Green – IFQ America – replaced Steve Elkington
- Barry Hume – Western Gailes – replaced Mark Hensby
- Ian Spencer – Irvine – replaced Toshimitsu Izawa
- Neil Evans – Turnberry Kintyre – replaced Warren Bennett
- Brett Taylor – Glasgow (Gailes) – replaced Andre Stolz
- David Griffiths – Western Gailes – replaced David Duval

== Round summaries ==
=== First round ===
Thursday, 15 July 2004

Paul Casey and Thomas Levet both carded 66 (−5) and held a two stroke lead over a group of nine players. The group at 3-under included amateur Stuart Wilson and Vijay Singh. Defending champ Ben Curtis carded a 75 (+4). In total there were 39 rounds under par, 25 of those being in the 60s. Home favourite Colin Montgomerie started with a 2-under 69.

Place	Player	Score	To par
T1	(England) Paul Casey	66	−5
T1	(France) Thomas Levet	66	−5
T3	(South Korea) K. J. Choi	68	−3
T3	(England) Gary Evans	68	−3
T3	(England) Kenneth Ferrie	68	−3
T3	(Scotland) Alastair Forsyth	68	−3
T3	(Australia) Mathew Goggin	68	−3
T3	(Sweden) Mårten Olander	68	−3
T3	(Sweden) Carl Pettersson	68	−3
T3	(Fiji) Vijay Singh	68	−3
T3	(Scotland) Stuart Wilson (a)	68	−3

=== Second round ===
Friday, 16 July 2004

Skip Kendall stormed into the lead with a 66 to reach the halfway stage at 135 (−7). Casey dropped down the leaderboard with a 77, while Levet shot a 70 to drop down into second. K. J. Choi continued his good start with a 69, keeping him in a tie for third place with Barry Lane. Todd Hamilton finished the round with a 67 to move up into a tie for fifth place.

Place	Player	Score	To par
1	(United States) Skip Kendall	69-66=135	−7
2	(France) Thomas Levet	66-70=136	−6
T3	(South Korea) K. J. Choi	68-69=137	−5
T3	(England) Barry Lane	69-68=137	−5
T5	(New Zealand) Michael Campbell	67-71=138	−4
T5	(South Africa) Ernie Els	69-69=138	−4
T5	(United States) Todd Hamilton	71-67=138	−4
T5	(Scotland) Colin Montgomerie	69-69=138	−4
T5	(Fiji) Vijay Singh	68-70=138	−4
T10	(South Africa) Retief Goosen	69-70=139	−3
T10	(United States) Phil Mickelson	73-66=139	−3
T10	(United States) Kenny Perry	69-70=139	−3
T10	(United States) Scott Verplank	69-70=139	−3
T10	(Canada) Mike Weir	71-68=139	−3

Amateurs: Stuart Wilson (+1), Campbell (+5), Tiley (+5), Flanagan (+6), McElhinney (+10).

=== Third round ===
Saturday, 17 July 2004

Hamilton surged up the leader with a second consecutive 67 to finish the day at 205 (−8). Ernie Els, the 2002 champion, moved up to second at 206 with a 68, while one shot behind lay the reigning Masters champion Phil Mickelson, Retief Goosen, and Thomas Levet at 207 (−6).

Place	Player	Score	To par
1	(United States) Todd Hamilton	71-67-67=205	−8
2	(South Africa) Ernie Els	69-69-68=206	−7
T3	(South Africa) Retief Goosen	69-70-68=207	−6
T3	(France) Thomas Levet	66-70-71=207	−6
T3	(United States) Phil Mickelson	73-66-68=207	−6
6	(England) Barry Lane	69-68-71=208	−5
T7	(United States) Scott Verplank	69-70-70=209	−4
T7	(United States) Tiger Woods	70-71-68=209	−4
T9	(United States) Skip Kendall	69-66-75=210	−3
T9	(Scotland) Colin Montgomerie	69-69-72=210	−3
T9	(Canada) Mike Weir	71-68-71=210	−3

=== Final round ===
Sunday, 18 July 2004

A see-saw final round led to a two-man playoff between Hamilton and Els. Hamilton, playing in only his eighth major, opened up a two-shot lead after chipping in for birdie from 30 feet (9 m) on the par-3 14th to get to 10 under. Then he holed a 12-foot (4 m) birdie on the par-5 16th to keep his cushion. Els had to make birdies to keep up, and he came through with pure putts on the 16th and 17th. Then came the wild 72nd hole, with Hamilton holding a one shot lead. Hamilton pushed his iron off the tee and into the rough, then chopped it across the fairway next to a guard railing that restricted his swing. Els hit his approach to within the shadow of the flag, leaving a 12-foot birdie attempt. Hamilton chipped to 20 feet (6 m) and missed to take bogey. Els suddenly had a putt to win, but left it short. Mickelson carded a final round 68 to finish a shot back at 275 (−9). A 67 moved Lee Westwood into sole fourth, matching Davis Love III for low score of the final round.

Place	Player	Score	To par	Money (£)
T1	(United States) Todd Hamilton	71-67-67-69=274	−10	Playoff
T1	(South Africa) Ernie Els	69-69-68-68=274	−10	Playoff
3	(United States) Phil Mickelson	73-66-68-68=275	−9	275,000
4	(England) Lee Westwood	72-71-68-67=278	−6	210,000
T5	(France) Thomas Levet	66-70-71-72=279	−5	159,500
T5	(United States) Davis Love III	72-69-71-67=279	−5	159,500
T7	(South Africa) Retief Goosen	69-70-68-73=280	−4	117,500
T7	(United States) Scott Verplank	69-70-70-71=280	−4	117,500
T9	(Canada) Mike Weir	71-68-71-71=281	−3	89,500
T9	(United States) Tiger Woods	70-71-68-72=281	−3	89,500

Amateurs: Wilson (+12)

==== Scorecard ====
Final round

Hole	1	2	3	4	5	6	7	8	9	10	11	12	13	14	15	16	17	18
Par	4	4	4	5	3	5	4	3	4	4	4	4	4	3	4	5	3	4
(United States) Hamilton	−8	−7	−7	−8	−9	−9	−9	−9	−9	−8	−9	−9	−9	−10	−10	−11	−11	−10
(South Africa) Els	−7	−7	−8	−9	−8	−8	−9	−9	−9	−7	−7	−7	−8	−8	−8	−9	−10	−10
(United States) Mickelson	−6	−6	−6	−8	−8	−8	−9	−9	−9	−9	−9	−9	−8	−8	−8	−9	−9	−9
(England) Westwood	−2	−2	−1	−1	E	−1	−2	−3	−3	−4	−4	−4	−4	−4	−4	−5	−5	−6
(France) Levet	−6	−6	−6	−8	−8	−8	−8	−7	−7	−7	−7	−7	−7	−7	−6	−6	−5	−5
(United States) Love	E	E	−1	−2	−2	−2	−2	−3	−3	−3	−3	−3	−3	−3	−3	−3	−3	−5
(South Africa) Goosen	−5	−5	−5	−6	−6	−6	−6	−6	−5	−5	−4	−4	−4	-4	−4	−4	−4	−4

Cumulative tournament scores, relative to par

==== Playoff ====
After 72 holes, Hamilton and Els were tied for the lead at 274 (−10), requiring a four-hole aggregate playoff, played over the 1st, 2nd, 17th, and 18th holes. (The first use of this format in The Open was fifteen years earlier in 1989, also at Royal Troon.) Both players parred the first two holes, both par fours, and Hamilton managed a par 3 on the 222-yard (203 m) 17th. Els overshot the green and bogeyed, then parred the last, leaving Hamilton a 3-foot (1 m) par putt to win the Open, which he holed. Els had all four rounds in the 60s for the second time in an Open without winning; the other time was at Royal St. George's in 1993.

Place	Player	Score	To par	Money (£)
1	(United States) Todd Hamilton	4-4-3-4=15	E	720,000
2	(South Africa) Ernie Els	4-4-4-4=16	+1	430,000

===== Scorecard =====
Hole	1	2	17	18
Par	4	4	3	4
(United States) Hamilton	E	E	E	E
(South Africa) Els	E	E	+1	+1

Cumulative playoff scores, relative to par
