= 1997 Open Championship =

Coordinates: 55.532°N 4.65°W

Tournament information
- Dates: 17–20 July 1997
- Location: Troon, Scotland
- Course: Royal Troon Golf Club
- Tour(s): European Tour; PGA Tour

Statistics
- Par: 71
- Length: 7,079 yards (6,473 m)
- Field: 156 players, 70 after cut
- Cut: 147 (+5)
- Prize fund: £1,600,000 €2,220,820 $2,680,000
- Winner's share: £250,000 €350,000 $418,875

Champion
- (United States) Justin Leonard
- 272 (−12)

Location in Scotland
Location in South Ayrshire, Scotland

The 1997 Open Championship was a men's major golf championship and the 126th Open Championship, held from 17 to 20 July at the Royal Troon Golf Club in Troon, Scotland. Justin Leonard won his only major championship and was the fifth consecutive American to win at Royal Troon.

Five strokes back after a 72 in the third round, Leonard had six birdies on the front nine in the final round; he added two more at 16 and 17 for 65 (−6) to win by three strokes over runners-up Darren Clarke and Jesper Parnevik, the 54-hole leader.

== Course ==
Old Course

Hole	Name	Yards	Par	Hole	Name	Yards	Par
1	Seal	364	4	10	Sandhills	438	4
2	Black Rock	391	4	11	The Railway	463	4
3	Gyaws	379	4	12	The Fox	431	4
4	Dunure	557	5	13	Burmah	465	4
5	Greenan	210	3	14	Alton	179	3
6	Turnberry	577	5	15	Crosbie	457	4
7	Tel-el-Kebir	402	4	16	Well	542	5
8	Postage Stamp	126	3	17	Rabbit	223	3
9	The Monk	423	4	18	Craigend	452	4
Out		3,429	36	In		3,650	35
Source:				Total		7,079	71

Lengths of the course for previous Opens (since 1950):

- 1989: 7,097 yards (6,489 m), par 72
- 1982: 7,067 yards (6,462 m), par 72
- 1973: 7,064 yards (6,459 m), par 72
- 1962: 7,045 yards (6,442 m), par 72
- 1950: 6,583 yards (6,019 m), par 70

Opens from 1962 through 1989 played the 11th hole as a par-5.

== Round summaries ==
=== First round ===
Thursday, 17 July 1997

Place	Player	Score	To par
T1	(Northern Ireland) Darren Clarke	67	−4
T1	(United States) Jim Furyk	67	−4
T3	(United States) Fred Couples	69	−2
T3	(United States) Justin Leonard	69	−2
T3	(Australia) Greg Norman	69	−2
T6	(Argentina) Ángel Cabrera	70	−1
T6	(Scotland) Barclay Howard (a)	70	−1
T6	(United States) Davis Love III	70	−1
T6	(United States) Andrew Magee	70	−1
T6	(Sweden) Jesper Parnevik	70	−1

=== Second round ===
Friday, 18 July 1997

Place	Player	Score	To par
1	(Northern Ireland) Darren Clarke	67-66=133	−9
2	(United States) Justin Leonard	69-66=135	−7
3	(Sweden) Jesper Parnevik	70-66=136	−6
T4	(United States) Fred Couples	69-68=137	−5
T4	(England) David Tapping	71-66=137	−5
T6	(United States) Jim Furyk	67-72=139	−3
T6	(United States) Tom Kite	72-67=139	−3
8	(Argentina) Ángel Cabrera	70-70=140	−2
T9	(United States) Mark Calcavecchia	74-67=141	−1
T9	(United States) Jay Haas	71-70=141	−1
T9	(United States) Davis Love III	70-71=141	−1
T9	(United States) Tom Watson	71-70=141	−1

Amateurs: Howard (+2), Watson (+7), Bladon (+10), Olsson (+11), Webster (+11), Taylor (+15), Young (+17), Miller (+22).

=== Third round ===
Saturday, 19 July 1997

Place	Player	Score	To par
1	(Sweden) Jesper Parnevik	70-66-66=202	−11
2	(Northern Ireland) Darren Clarke	67-66-71=204	−9
T3	(United States) Fred Couples	69-68-70=207	−6
T3	(United States) Justin Leonard	69-66-72=207	−6
T5	(Trinidad and Tobago) Stephen Ames	74-69-66=209	−4
T5	(United States) Jim Furyk	67-72-70=209	−4
T5	(Argentina) Eduardo Romero	74-68-67=209	−4
T8	(Australia) Robert Allenby	76-68-66=210	−3
T8	(England) Lee Westwood	73-70-67=210	−3
T8	(United States) Tiger Woods	72-74-64=210	−3

=== Final round ===
Sunday, 20 July 1997

Place	Player	Score	To par	Money (£)
1	(United States) Justin Leonard	69-66-72-65=272	−12	250,000
T2	(Northern Ireland) Darren Clarke	67-66-71-71=275	−9	150,000
T2	(Sweden) Jesper Parnevik	70-66-66-73=275	−9	150,000
4	(United States) Jim Furyk	67-72-70-70=279	−5	90,000
T5	(Republic of Ireland) Pádraig Harrington	75-69-69-67=280	−4	62,500
T5	(Trinidad and Tobago) Stephen Ames	74-69-66-71=280	−4	62,500
T7	(Australia) Peter O'Malley	73-70-70-68=281	−3	40,667
T7	(Argentina) Eduardo Romero	74-68-67-72=281	−3	40,667
T7	(United States) Fred Couples	69-68-70-74=281	−3	40,667
T10	(United States) Davis Love III	70-71-74-67=282	−2	24,300
T10	(South Africa) Retief Goosen	75-69-70-68=282	−2	24,300
T10	(New Zealand) Frank Nobilo	74-72-68-68=282	−2	24,300
T10	(United States) Tom Kite	72-67-74-69=282	−2	24,300
T10	(United States) Mark Calcavecchia	74-67-72-69=282	−2	24,300
T10	(Japan) Shigeki Maruyama	74-69-70-69=282	−2	24,300
T10	(South Africa) Ernie Els	75-69-69-69=282	−2	24,300
T10	(United States) Tom Watson	71-70-70-71=282	−2	24,300
T10	(Australia) Robert Allenby	76-68-66-72=282	−2	24,300
T10	(England) Lee Westwood	73-70-67-72=282	−2	24,300

Amateurs: Howard (+9)

==== Scorecard ====
Hole	1	2	3	4	5	6	7	8	9	10	11	12	13	14	15	16	17	18
Par	4	4	4	5	3	5	4	3	4	4	4	4	4	3	4	5	3	4
(United States) Leonard	−6	−7	−8	−9	−8	−9	−10	−10	−11	−10	−10	−10	−10	−10	−10	−11	−12	−12
(Northern Ireland) Clarke	−10	−8	−8	−8	−8	−9	−9	−9	−8	−8	−8	−8	−8	−8	−7	−8	−8	−9
(Sweden) Parnevik	−11	−11	−12	−12	−12	−11	−12	−12	−12	−11	−12	−12	−11	−11	−11	−11	−10	−9

Cumulative tournament scores, relative to par

Eagle	Birdie	Bogey	Double bogey
