= Royal Troon Golf Club =

Scottish golf club

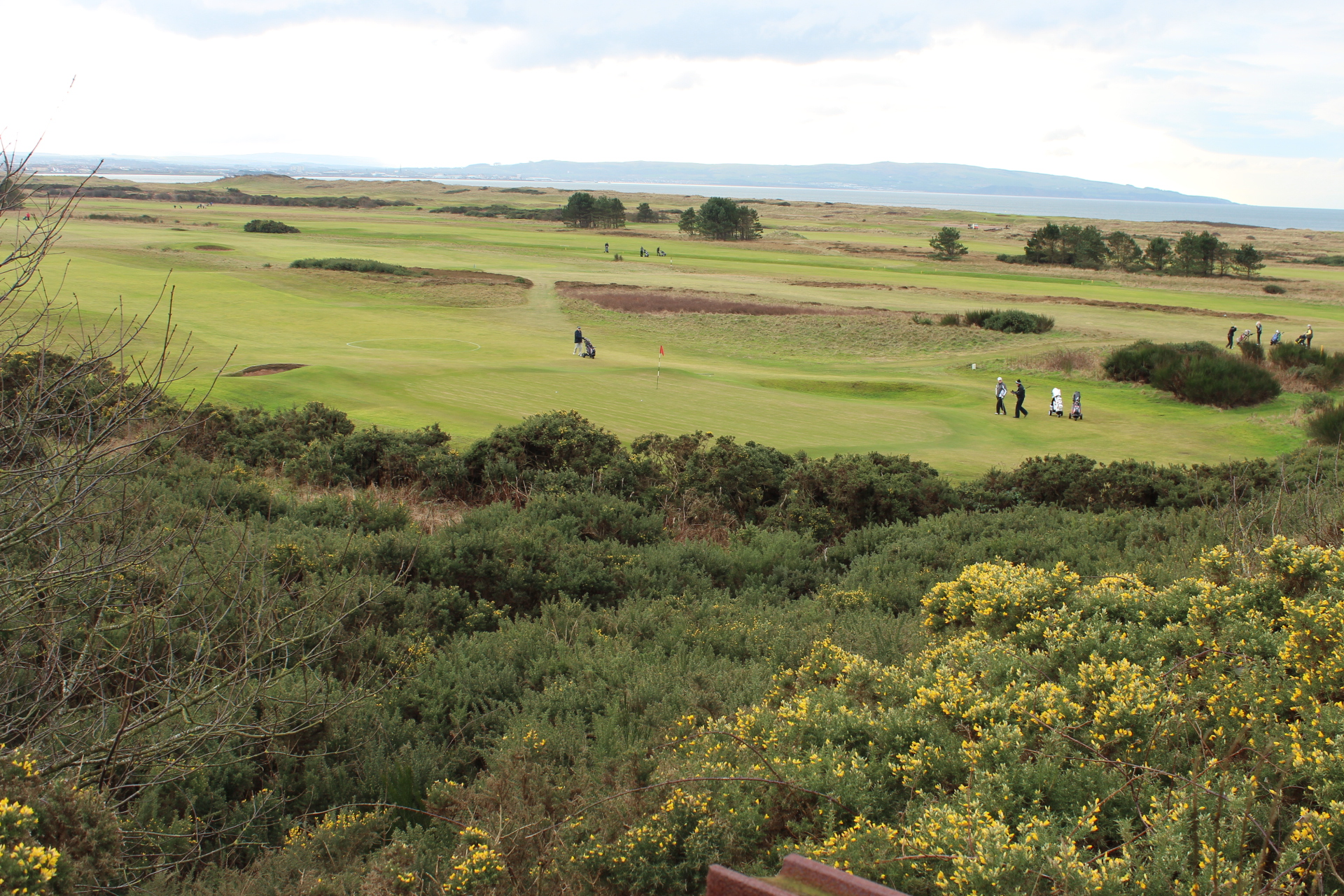
- Royal Troon, January 2014

- Location in Scotland Location in South Ayrshire, Scotland
- 55.532°N 4.65°W

Club information
- Location: Troon, South Ayrshire, Scotland
- Established: 1878; 148 years ago
- Type: Private
- Total holes: 45
- Tournaments: The Open Championship, The Amateur Championship, The Senior Open Championship; The Women's Open Championship
- Website: royaltroon.co.uk

Old Course
- Designed by: George Strath and Willie Fernie, 1888; James Braid, 1923; Martin Ebert (2014 renovation)
- Par: 71
- Length: 7,175 yards (6,561 m)
- Course rating: 75

Portland Course
- Designed by: Willie Fernie, 1895; Alister MacKenzie, 1921
- Par: 71
- Length: 6,289 yards (5,751 m)
- Course rating: 71

Craigend Course
- Par: 27
- Length: 1,191 yards (1,089 m)
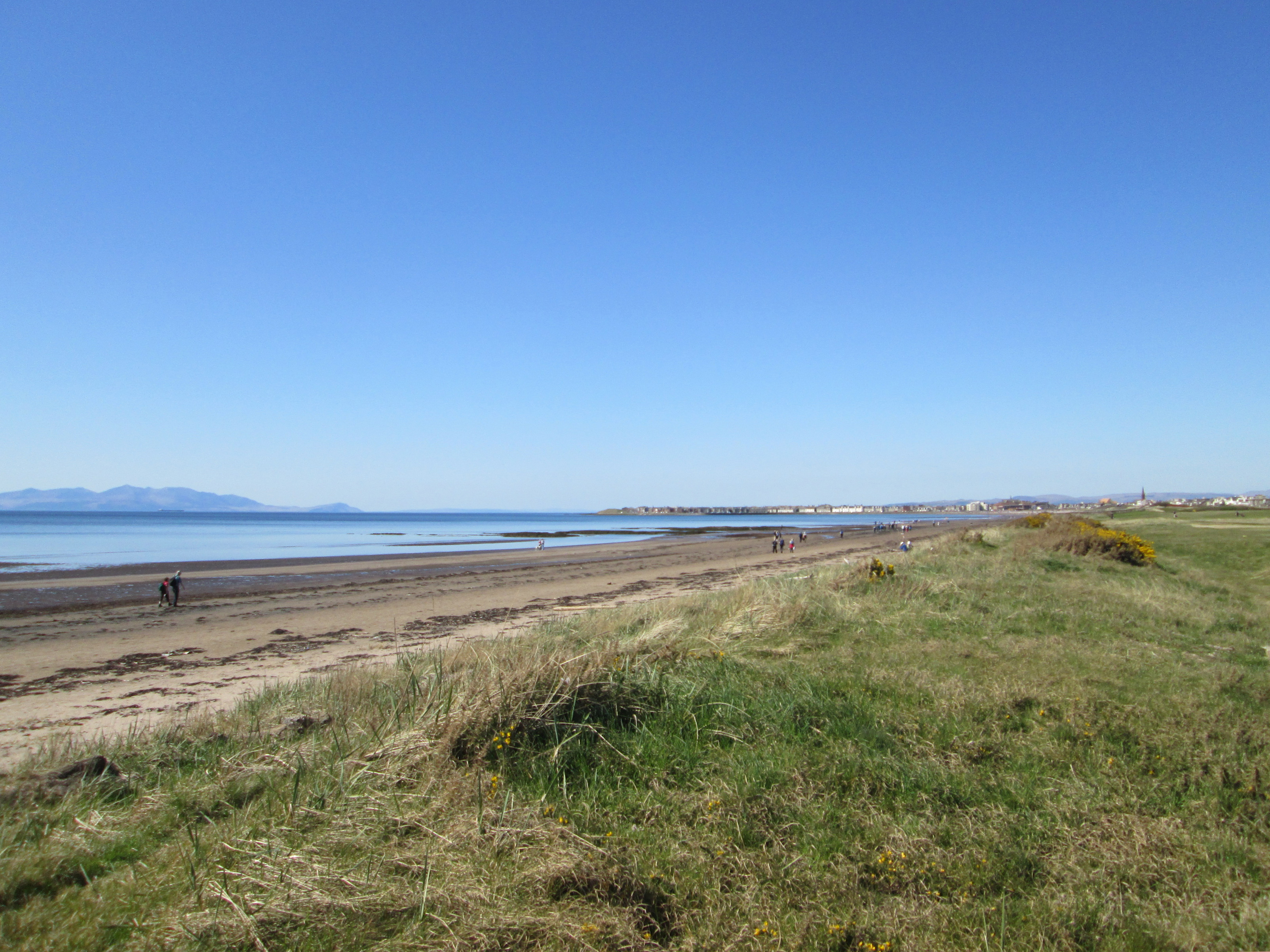
- The Firth of Clyde beach and Royal Troon are separated by raised sand dunes

Royal Troon Golf Club is a links golf course in Scotland, located in Troon, South Ayrshire. The club was established in 1878, and originally only consisted of five holes whereas today, it has increased to a total of 45 holes. Its Old Course is one of the host courses for The Open Championship, one of the major championships on the PGA Tour and European Tour. The Club most recently hosted in 2024 for the tenth time. It also hosted the Women's British Open in 2020.

On 1 July 2016, Royal Troon members voted overwhelmingly to admit women into the club as members, avoiding a potential controversy that could have led to the club being removed from the Open Championship rota.

== History ==
=== Establishment ===
The club, which now has a total of 45 holes, was founded in 1878, initially with five holes. It lies adjacent to the Firth of Clyde. George Strath was appointed in 1881 as the club's first golf professional, and together with 1882 Open champion Willie Fernie, designed the original course, expanding it to 18 holes by 1888. The two were assisted by Charlie Hunter, greenskeeper of the neighbouring Prestwick Golf Club, in Troon's formative years.

When Strath left the club's employ in 1887, Fernie became head professional, and served in that role until his death in 1924. He laid out the club's Relief course, on the site of what would become Troon's New course, designed by Alister MacKenzie; Shortly after opening the New course was renamed in honour of the 6th Duke of Portland, an essential early Troon Golf Club patron and facilitator, who was one of the region's largest landowners.

The club's property lies between the Firth of Clyde on the west, a caravan park on the south (slightly further south lies Prestwick Golf Club), the railway line and main road on the east, and the town of Troon on the north. Glasgow Prestwick Airport is located slightly to the south and east of the club, and low-flying aircraft are nearest its southern section.

=== Open Championship ===
Its Old Course is one of the host courses for The Open Championship, one of the major championships on the PGA Tour and European Tour. The club has hosted 11 Open Championships -- 1923, 1950, 1962, 1973, 1982, 1989, 1997, 2004, 2016, 2020 (only a women's edition in 2020; no championships for men were offered by The R&A), and 2024.

Just prior to Royal Troon hosting its first Open Championship in 1923, the Old Course was redesigned, lengthened, and strengthened by James Braid, a five-time Open champion, one of the era's top architects, and a member of the World Golf Hall of Fame. Other than having new back tees on several holes, six completely re-sited greens, much narrower fairways, (when not changed entirely for the re-positioned greens), and vastly different bunkering, the current Old Course is essentially very similar to Braid's finished work.

Past Open champions at Royal Troon include Justin Leonard, Mark Calcavecchia, Tom Watson, Tom Weiskopf, Arnold Palmer, Bobby Locke, and Arthur Havers. Six consecutive Opens at Troon were won by Americans, from 1962 through 2004, ended by Henrik Stenson of Sweden in 2016.

German golfer Sophia Popov's status as Champion Golfer of the Year in the 2020 Open Championship, where there was only a tournament for women that year, was regarded as one of the greatest upsets in major championship golf.

=== Royal designation ===
Troon was granted its "Royal" designation in 1978, during its centenary. Its clubhouse, designed by Henry Edward Clifford and built in 1886, is richly decorated with historical golf artifacts. James Montgomerie, father of Colin Montgomerie, served as Secretary in the 1980s.

Its Old Course is one of the host courses for The Open Championship, one of the major championships on the PGA Tour and European Tour. The club has hosted 11 Open Championships, ten for men (most recently in 2024), and the 2020 Open for women (no men's equivalent that year).

=== Recent history ===
On 1 July 2016, Royal Troon members voted overwhelmingly to admit women into the club as members, avoiding a potential controversy that could have overshadowed the 2016 Open Championship and led to the club being removed from the Open rota.

== Noteworthy characteristics ==
The Old Course begins alongside the sea, running southwards in a line for the first six holes. This opening section offers full visibility and plenty of space, but does still require accuracy to avoid deep bunkers. Many good rounds have been fashioned through low scores here, often aided by prevailing downwind conditions. Beginning with the seventh, the Old Course turns further inland, while simultaneously changing direction, on each of its next six holes, among hillier dunes and thicker vegetation, including ulex (commonly known as gorse, furze, or whin), to severely punish offline shots. This sector, with two blind tee shots on the tenth and 11th, marks a sharp rise in difficulty from the opening holes. With the 13th hole, the player turns northwards for a long, very stern finish, running parallel to the opening stretch. This comprises three long par 4s, two tough par 3s, and a challenging par 5 (the 16th) with its fairway bisected at the halfway point by a ditch, which can only very rarely be carried from the tee. The player very often has to face a strong prevailing wind.

Royal Troon is home to the shortest hole in Open Championship golf. Described by Golf Monthly as one of the most famous holes in the world, the par-3 8th hole ("Postage Stamp") measures a scant 123 yards (112 m), but its diminutive green measures a mere 2,635 square feet (293 sq yd; 245 m^{2}). Two holes earlier, the par-5 6th ("Turnberry") extends to a lengthy 601 yards (550 m) and until the championship at Royal Liverpool in 2023 was the longest hole in Open history.

The 11th hole ("The Railway") is one of the most difficult holes in major championship golf. Changed to a long par-4, a blind tee shot has a long carry over gorse with out of bounds all along the railway on the right. The lengthy approach shot is to a small green that falls away, with nearby out of bounds.

== The Portland and Craigend Courses ==
The Old Course is the championship layout at Royal Troon. Its second course, the Portland, also an 18-hole layout from 1895, but significantly shorter than the Old Course, was redesigned in 1921 by golf course architect Dr. Alister MacKenzie, a member of the World Golf Hall of Fame. The Portland is also of very high standard. It is located slightly further inland and further north than the Old Course, with no holes bordering the Firth of Clyde; it has its own clubhouse. The Craigend Course is a nine-hole par-3 course.

The club is private; guests are allowed at certain times, under advance booking, with a handicap certificate establishing proficiency. The Old Course has four tees – "Ladies", "Short", "Medal" and "Championship".

== Layout ==
For The 2024 Open Championship:

Hole	Name	Yards	Par	Hole	Name	Yards	Par
1	Seal	366	4	10	Sandhills	450	4
2	Black Rock	389	4	11	The Railway	498	4
3	Gyaws	376	4	12	The Fox	451	4
4	Dunure	599	5	13	Burmah	473	4
5	Greenan	220	3	14	Alton	200	3
6	Turnberry	623	5	15	Crosbie	502	4
7	Tel-el-Kebir	403	4	16	Well	572	5
8	Postage Stamp	123	3	17	Rabbit	242	3
9	The Monk	440	4	18	Craigend	458	4
Out		3,539	36	In		3,846	35
Source:				Total		7,385	71

Lengths of the course for previous Opens (since 1950):

- 2024 : 7,385 yards (6,753 m), par 71
- 2020 : 6,632 yards (6,064 m), par 71 (women's)
- 2016 : 7,190 yards (6,570 m), par 71
- 2004 : 7,175 yards (6,561 m), par 71
- 1997 : 7,079 yards (6,473 m), par 71
- 1989 : 7,097 yards (6,489 m), par 72
- 1982 : 7,067 yards (6,462 m), par 72
- 1973 : 7,064 yards (6,459 m), par 72
- 1962 : 7,045 yards (6,442 m), par 72
- 1950 : 6,583 yards (6,019 m), par 70

Opens from 1962 through 1989 played the 11th hole as a par-5.

== The Open Championship ==
The Open Championship has been held at Troon on ten occasions:

Year	Winner	Score					Winner's share (£)
Year	Winner	R1	R2	R3	R4	Total	Winner's share (£)
1923	(England) Arthur Havers	73	73	73	76	295	75
1950	(South Africa) Bobby Locke ^{2nd}	69	72	70	68	279 (−1)	300
1962	(United States) Arnold Palmer ^{2nd}	71	69	67	69	276 (−12)	1,400
1973	(United States) Tom Weiskopf	68	67	71	70	276 (−12)	5,500
1982	(United States) Tom Watson ^{4th}	69	71	74	70	284 (−4)	32,000
1989	(United States) Mark Calcavecchia	71	68	68	68	275 (−13)^{PO}	80,000
1997	(United States) Justin Leonard	69	66	72	65	272 (−12)	250,000
2004	(United States) Todd Hamilton	71	67	67	69	274 (−10)^{PO}	720,000
2016	(Sweden) Henrik Stenson	68	65	68	63	264 (−20)	1,175,000
2024	(United States) Xander Schauffele	69	72	69	65	275 (−9)	2,400,680

- Note: For multiple winners of The Open Championship, superscript ordinal identifies which in their respective careers.

== Women's Open ==
The Women's Open Championship has been held at Troon once:

Year	Winner	Score					Winner's share (US$)
Year	Winner	R1	R2	R3	R4	Total	Winner's share (US$)
2020	(Germany) Sophia Popov	70	72	67	68	277 (−7)	675,000

== Hosts further significant events ==
- Royal Troon has hosted the Amateur Championship on five occasions: 1956, 1968, 1978, 2003, and 2012.
- The club has hosted the British Ladies Amateur Golf Championship on four occasions: 1904, 1925, 1952, and 1984.
- The club has hosted the Senior Open Championship in 2008, and American Bruce Vaughan won.
- The club has hosted the Scottish Amateur on six occasions: 1923, 1956, 1963, 1969, 1977 and 2009.
- The club has hosted the Scottish Ladies' Amateur on five occasions: 1907, 1949, 1957, 1963, and 1982.

== See also ==
- List of golf clubs granted Royal status
