= 1989 Open Championship =

Coordinates: 55.316°N 4.832°W

Tournament information
- Dates: 20–23 July 1989
- Location: Troon, Scotland
- Course: Royal Troon Golf Club
- Tour(s): European Tour; PGA Tour

Statistics
- Par: 72
- Length: 7,097 yards (6,489 m)
- Field: 156 players, 80 after cut
- Cut: 146 (+2)
- Prize fund: £725,000 $1,165,600
- Winner's share: £80,000 $128,000

Champion
- (United States) Mark Calcavecchia
- 275 (−13), playoff

Location in Scotland
Location in South Ayrshire, Scotland

The 1989 Open Championship was a men's major golf championship and the 118th Open Championship, held from 20 to 23 July at the Royal Troon Golf Club in Troon, Scotland. Mark Calcavecchia won his only major championship in a playoff over Greg Norman and Wayne Grady. It was the first playoff at the Open in fourteen years and the first use of the four-hole aggregate playoff, adopted in 1985. The playoff was formerly 18 holes the following day (and 36 holes prior to 1964). Calcavecchia was the first American champion at The Open in six years. Norman shot a course record 64 (−8) in the final round to get into the playoff. In the playoff, over holes 1-2-17-18 of the course, Norman started off in the same form he had finished the main round, with birdies at the first two holes. Calcavecchia also scored a birdie at the second, Grady only making par at both: but at the short 17th, Calcavecchia was the only one to make par while Norman dropped a shot, back into a tie for the lead, and Grady also bogeyed it to be two shots behind. Then Calcavecchia made a birdie at the last, and Grady a regulation par, whereas Norman found two bunkers in succession and then mishit his third shot out of bounds, following which he picked up his ball and conceded without completing the hole.

== Course ==
Old Course

Hole	Name	Yards	Par	Hole	Name	Yards	Par
1	Seal	364	4	10	Sandhills	438	4
2	Black Rock	391	4	11	The Railway	481	5
3	Gyaws	379	4	12	The Fox	431	4
4	Dunure	557	5	13	Burmah	465	4
5	Greenan	210	3	14	Alton	179	3
6	Turnberry	577	5	15	Crosbie	457	4
7	Tel-el-Kebir	402	4	16	Well	542	5
8	Postage Stamp	126	3	17	Rabbit	223	3
9	The Monk	423	4	18	Craigend	452	4
Out		3,429	36	In		3,668	36
Source:				Total		7,097	72

Lengths of the course for previous Opens (since 1950):

- 1982: 7,067 yards (6,462 m), par 72
- 1973: 7,064 yards (6,459 m), par 72
- 1962: 7,045 yards (6,442 m), par 72
- 1950: 6,583 yards (6,019 m), par 70

Opens from 1962 through 1989 played the 11th hole as a par-5.

== Round summaries ==
=== First round ===
Thursday, 20 July 1989

Place	Player	Score	To par
1	(England) Wayne Stephens	66	−6
T2	(United States) Paul Azinger	68	−4
T2	(United States) Fred Couples	68	−4
T2	(Australia) Wayne Grady	68	−4
T2	(Spain) Miguel Ángel Martín	68	−4
T2	(Spain) José María Olazábal	68	−4
T2	(Argentina) Eduardo Romero	68	−4
T2	(United States) Lee Trevino	68	−4
T9	(England) Derrick Cooper	69	−3
T9	(England) Mark James	69	−3
T9	(South Africa) Gavan Levenson	69	−3
T9	(Scotland) Brian Marchbank	69	−3
T9	(Australia) Greg Norman	69	−3
T9	(United States) Steve Pate	69	−3
T9	(Republic of Ireland) Philip Walton	69	−3
T9	(United States) Tom Watson	69	−3

=== Second round ===
Friday, 21 July 1989

Place	Player	Score	To par
1	(Australia) Wayne Grady	68-67=135	−9
T2	(United States) Payne Stewart	72-65=137	−7
T2	(United States) Tom Watson	69-68=137	−7
T4	(Northern Ireland) David Feherty	71-67=138	−6
T4	(Argentina) Eduardo Romero	68-70=138	−6
T4	(England) Wayne Stephens	66-72=138	−6
T7	(United States) Mark Calcavecchia	71-68=139	−5
T7	(England) Derrick Cooper	69-70=139	−5
T7	(United States) Fred Couples	68-71=139	−5
T7	(England) Mark James	69-70=139	−5
T7	(United States) Mark McCumber	71-68=139	−5
T7	(Australia) Greg Norman	69-70=139	−5
T7	(United States) Steve Pate	69-70=139	−5
T7	(United States) Scott Simpson	73-66=139	−5

Amateurs: Claydon (E), Karlsson (+1), Els (+4), Evans (+5), Dodd (+10), Milne (+10), Hare (+11), O'Shea (+11), Noon (+14), Meeks (+17).

=== Third round ===
Saturday, 22 July 1989

Place	Player	Score	To par
1	(Australia) Wayne Grady	68-67-69=204	−12
2	(United States) Tom Watson	69-68-68=205	−11
3	(United States) Payne Stewart	72-65-69=206	−10
T4	(United States) Mark Calcavecchia	71-68-68=207	−9
T4	(United States) Fred Couples	68-71-68=207	−9
T4	(Northern Ireland) David Feherty	71-67-69=207	−9
T7	(United States) Paul Azinger	68-73-67=208	−8
T7	(United States) Jodie Mudd	73-67-68=208	−8
T9	(United States) Mark McCumber	71-68-70=209	−7
T9	(Spain) José María Olazábal	68-72-69=209	−7
T9	(United States) Steve Pate	69-70-70=209	−7

=== Final round ===
Sunday, 23 July 1989

Place	Player	Score	To par	Money (£)
T1	(United States) Mark Calcavecchia	71-68-68-68=275	−13	Playoff
T1	(Australia) Greg Norman	69-70-72-64=275	−13	Playoff
T1	(Australia) Wayne Grady	68-67-69-71=275	−13	Playoff
4	(United States) Tom Watson	69-68-68-72=277	−11	40,000
5	(United States) Jodie Mudd	73-67-68-70=278	−10	30,000
T6	(United States) Fred Couples	68-71-68-72=279	−9	26,000
T6	(Northern Ireland) David Feherty	71-67-69-72=279	−9	26,000
T8	(Argentina) Eduardo Romero	68-70-75-67=280	−8	21,000
T8	(United States) Paul Azinger	68-73-67-72=280	−8	21,000
T8	(United States) Payne Stewart	72-65-69-74=280	−8	21,000

Amateurs: Claydon (+5), Karlsson (+11).

==== Playoff ====
Place	Player	Score	To par	Money (£)
1	(United States) Mark Calcavecchia	4-3-3-3=13	−2	80,000
T2	(Australia) Wayne Grady	4-4-4-4=16	+1	55,000
T2	(Australia) Greg Norman	3-3-4-x=x	x	55,000

The four-hole aggregate playoff was held on holes 1, 2, 17, and 18; three par fours and a par three (#17).

===== Scorecard =====
Playoff

Hole	1	2	17	18
Par	4	4	3	4
(United States) Calcavecchia	E	−1	−1	−2
(Australia) Grady	E	E	+1	+1
(Australia) Norman	−1	−2	−1	x

Cumulative playoff scores, relative to par
