= Sophia Popov =

German professional golfer (born 1992)

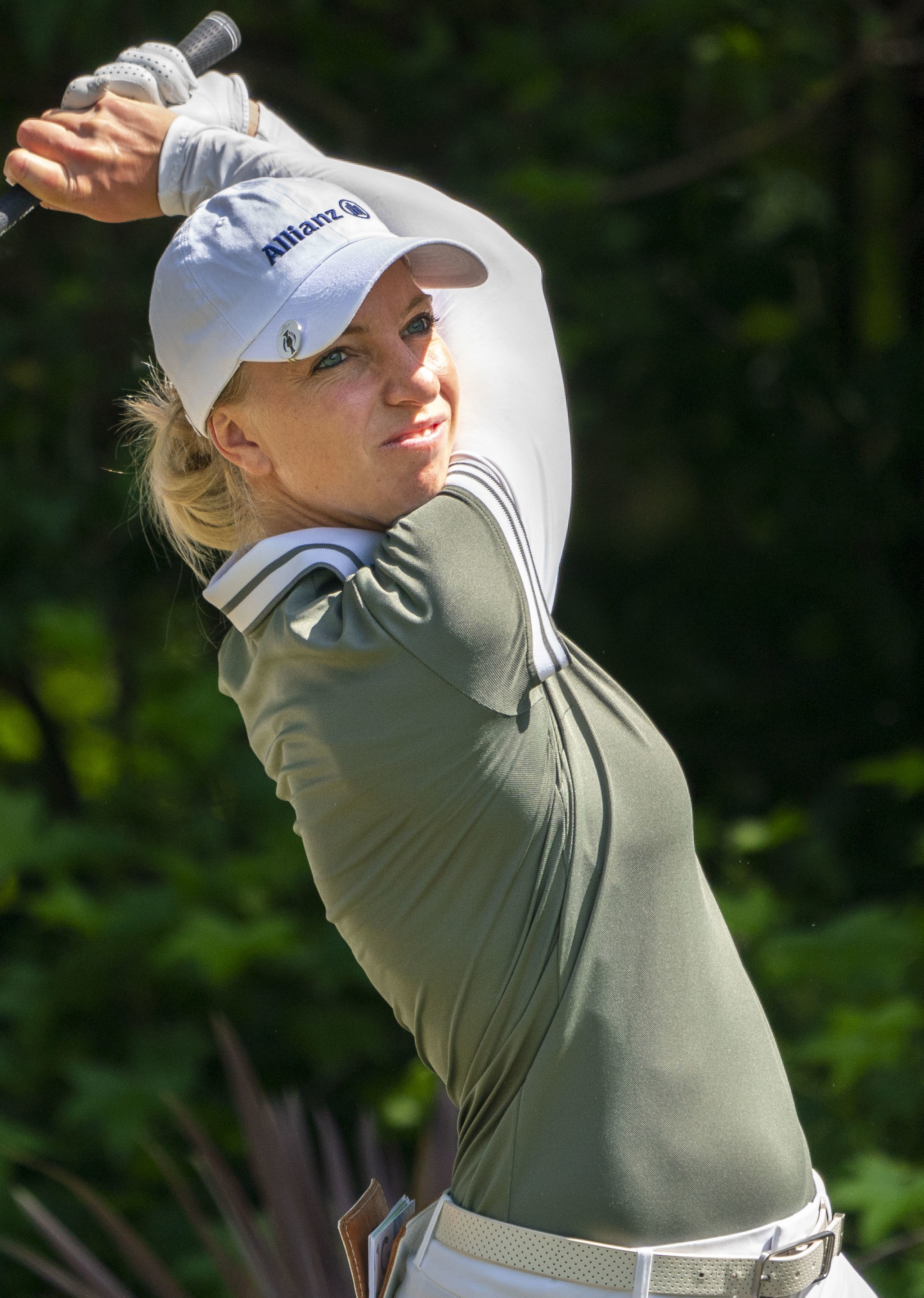
- Popov in 2019

Personal information
- Nationality: Germany
- Born: 2 October 1992 (age 34) Boston, Massachusetts, U.S.
- Height: 5 ft 7 in (170 cm)
- Spouse: Max Mehles
- Children: 1

Career
- Sport: Golf
- College: Southern California
- Turned professional: 2014
- Current tour: LPGA Tour
- Former tour: Symetra Tour
- Professional wins: 5

Number of wins by tour
- LPGA Tour: 1
- Ladies European Tour: 1
- Epson Tour: 1
- Other: 3

Best results in LPGA major championships (wins: 1)
- Chevron Championship: T30: 2025
- Women's PGA C'ship: T23: 2020
- U.S. Women's Open: T26: 2024
- Women's British Open: Won: 2020
- Evian Championship: T60: 2021

Sophia Popov (born 2 October 1992) is a German professional golfer who competes on the LPGA Tour.

== Personal life ==
Popov holds dual United States-German citizenship, having been born in the United States, and moved to Germany with her family when she was four years old. Her paternal grandparents are Bulgarian. On 11 June 2023, she and husband Max Mehles announced the birth of their daughter.

== Amateur career ==
As an amateur, she played college golf at the University of Southern California in Los Angeles. She won the 2010 International European Ladies Amateur Championship and played on the Junior Solheim Cup and Espirito Santo Trophy teams.

== Professional career ==
In 2015, Popov was part of the German broadcast team for German television during the Solheim Cup.

Popov played on the Symetra Tour between 2016 and 2020, where she had a best of four runner-up finishes: 2016 Chico's Patty Berg Memorial, 2016 Danielle Downey Credit Union Classic, 2017 Tullymore Classic and 2020 Founders Tribute at Longbow. In 2016, she qualified for the U.S. Women's Open at CordeValle, where she finished last of those making the cut, and in 2018 she played in the Women's PGA Championship at Kemper Lakes, finishing tied for 57th place.

In February 2019, Popov came within a stroke of gaining a place on the LPGA Tour for the 2019 season via the qualifying school. In 2020, with the LPGA and Symetra tours being impacted by the COVID-19 pandemic, she won three tournaments on the Cactus Tour, a mini-tour based in Arizona. She followed that up with victory in the AIG Women's Open at Royal Troon, having qualified by means of a high finish at the Marathon Classic. Prior to the Women's Open, Popov was ranked 304th in the world.

== Amateur wins ==
- 2008 European Ladies' Club Trophy (individual), German Girls Championship (Under-16)
- 2009 European Ladies' Club Trophy (individual)
- 2010 International European Ladies Amateur Championship, PAC 10-SEC Challenge
- 2011 PING/ASU Invitational, PAC-10 Championship
- 2012 Battle at Rancho Bernardo
- 2013 SDSU Farms Invitational

== Professional wins (5) ==
=== LPGA Tour wins (1) ===
Legend
Major championships (1)
Other LPGA Tour (0)

No.	Date	Tournament	Winning score	Margin of victory	Runner-up
1	23 Aug 2020	AIG Women's Open^{[1]}	−7 (70-72-67-68=277)	2 strokes	(Thailand) Thidapa Suwannapura

^{1} Co-sanctioned by the Ladies European Tour.

=== Epson Tour wins (1) ===
- 2025 Carlisle Arizona Women's Golf Classic

=== Cactus Tour wins (3) ===
- 2020 Event 14, Event 16, Event 20

== Major championships ==
=== Wins (1) ===
Year	Championship	54 holes	Winning score	Margin	Runner-up
2020	AIG Women's Open	3 shot lead	−7 (70-72-67-68=277)	2 strokes	(Thailand) Thidapa Suwannapura

=== Results timeline ===
Results not in chronological order.

Tournament	2011	2012	2013	2014	2015	2016	2017	2018	2019	2020	2021	2022	2023	2024	2025	2026
Chevron Championship											T60	T44		CUT	T30	
U.S. Women's Open						72				T40	CUT	CUT		T26	CUT	
Women's PGA Championship					CUT			T57		T23	CUT	CUT		CUT	CUT	
The Evian Championship										NT	T60	CUT		CUT	CUT	
Women's British Open	67									1	CUT	CUT		CUT	CUT	CUT

Win
Did not play

CUT = missed the half-way cut
NT = no tournament
T = tied

=== Summary ===
Tournament	Wins	2nd	3rd	Top-5	Top-10	Top-25	Events	Cuts made
Chevron Championship	0	0	0	0	0	0	4	3
U.S. Women's Open	0	0	0	0	0	0	6	3
Women's PGA Championship	0	0	0	0	0	1	7	2
The Evian Championship	0	0	0	0	0	0	4	1
Women's British Open	1	0	0	1	1	1	7	2
Totals	1	0	0	1	1	2	28	11

- Most consecutive cuts made – 6 (2016 U.S. Women's Open – 2021 Chevron)
- Longest streak of top-10s – 1 (once)

== Team appearances ==
Amateur

- European Girls' Team Championship (representing Germany): 2008. 2009
- Junior Solheim Cup (representing Europe): 2009
- Espirito Santo Trophy (representing Germany): 2010, 2012
- European Ladies' Team Championship (representing Germany): 2011, 2013, 2014
- Vagliano Trophy (representing Continent of Europe): 2011 (winners), 2013 (winners)

Professional

- Solheim Cup (representing Europe): 2021 (winners)

=== Solheim Cup record ===
Year	Total matches	Total W–L–H	Singles W–L–H	Foursomes W–L–H	Fourballs W–L–H	Points won	Points %
Career	3	0–3–0	0–1–0	0–0–0	0–2–0	0	0.0
2021	3	0–3–0	0–1–0 lost to M. Khang 3&2	0–0–0	0–2–0 lost w/ C. Ciganda 1 dn lost w/ C. Boutier 3&1	0	0.0
