= 1982 Open Championship =

Coordinates: 55.532°N 4.650°W

Tournament information
- Dates: 15–18 July 1982
- Location: Troon, Scotland
- Course: Royal Troon Golf Club
- Tours: European Tour; PGA Tour

Statistics
- Par: 72
- Length: 7,067 yards (6,462 m)
- Field: 150 players 87 after 1st cut 60 after 2nd cut
- Cut: 152 (+8) (1st cut); 226 (+10) (2nd cut)
- Prize fund: £250,000 $425,000
- Winner's share: £32,000 $54,400

Champion
- (United States) Tom Watson
- 284 (−4)

Location in Scotland
Location in South Ayrshire, Scotland

The 1982 Open Championship was a men's major golf championship and the 111th Open Championship, held from 15 to 18 July at Royal Troon Golf Club in Troon, Scotland. Tom Watson won his fourth Open Championship, one stroke ahead of runners-up Peter Oosterhuis and Nick Price. It was Watson's second consecutive major victory—he won the U.S. Open a month earlier—and the seventh of his eight major titles.

Watson became the fifth to win the U.S. Open and the Open Championship in the same year, joining fellow Americans Bobby Jones (1926, 1930), Gene Sarazen (1932), Ben Hogan (1953), and Lee Trevino (1971). Tiger Woods later won both in 2000.

Watson's previous three Open wins also came in Scotland, at Carnoustie (1975), Turnberry (1977), and Muirfield (1980). His fifth victory in the Open in 1983 came at Royal Birkdale in England.

== Course ==
Old Course

Hole	Name	Yards	Par	Hole	Name	Yards	Par
1	Seal	362	4	10	Sandhills	437	4
2	Black Rock	391	4	11	The Railway	481	5
3	Gyaws	381	4	12	The Fox	432	4
4	Dunure	556	5	13	Burmah	468	4
5	Greenan	210	3	14	Alton	180	3
6	Turnberry	577	5	15	Crosbie	457	4
7	Tel-el-Kebir	400	4	16	Well	542	5
8	Postage Stamp	126	3	17	Rabbit	223	3
9	The Monk	419	4	18	Craigend	425	4
Out		3,422	36	In		3,645	36
Source:				Total		7,067	72

Lengths of the course for previous Opens (since 1950):

- 1973: 7,064 yards (6,459 m), par 72
- 1962: 7,045 yards (6,442 m), par 72
- 1950: 6,583 yards (6,019 m), par 70

Opens from 1962 through 1989 played the 11th hole as a par-5.

== Round summaries ==
=== First round ===
Thursday, 15 July 1982

Place	Player	Score	To par
1	(United States) Bobby Clampett	67	−5
T2	(Zimbabwe) Nick Price	69	−3
T2	(United States) Tom Watson	69	−3
T4	(Scotland) Ken Brown	70	−2
T4	(West Germany) Bernhard Langer	70	−2
T4	(Republic of Ireland) Des Smyth	70	−2
T7	(Spain) Seve Ballesteros	71	−1
T7	(Spain) José María Cañizares	71	−1
T7	(United States) Danny Edwards	71	−1
T7	(Japan) Masahiro Kuramoto	71	−1
T7	(United States) Johnny Miller	71	−1
T7	(United States) Arnold Palmer	71	−1
T7	(United States) Craig Stadler	71	−1

=== Second round ===
Friday, 16 July 1982

Place	Player	Score	To par
1	(United States) Bobby Clampett	67-66=133	−11
2	(Zimbabwe) Nick Price	69-69=138	−6
T3	(West Germany) Bernhard Langer	70-69=139	−5
T3	(Republic of Ireland) Des Smyth	70-69=139	−5
T5	(Scotland) Sandy Lyle	74-66=140	−4
T5	(United States) Tom Watson	69-71=140	−4
T7	(Scotland) Ken Brown	70-71=141	−3
T7	(England) Peter Oosterhuis	74-67=141	−3
9	(United States) Tom Purtzer	76-66=142	−2
T10	(Spain) José María Cañizares	71-72=143	−1
T10	(Australia) David Graham	73-70=143	−1
T10	(United States) Bill Rogers	73-70=143	−1

Amateurs: Lewis (+4), Oldcorn (+9), Plaxton (+9), Stubbs (+10), Thompson (+10), Broadbent (+12), Persson (+12), Rose (+12), Thomson (+12), Ray (+13), Andersson (+16), Young (+17), Higgins (+19), Poxon (+19), Crosby (+22).

=== Third round ===
Saturday, 17 July 1982

Place	Player	Score	To par
1	(United States) Bobby Clampett	67-66-78=211	−5
2	(Zimbabwe) Nick Price	69-69-74=212	−4
T3	(Scotland) Sandy Lyle	74-66-73=213	−3
T3	(Republic of Ireland) Des Smyth	70-69-74=213	−3
5	(United States) Tom Watson	69-71-74=214	−2
T6	(Japan) Masahiro Kuramoto	71-73-71=215	−1
T6	(England) Peter Oosterhuis	74-67-74=215	−1
T8	(England) Nick Faldo	73-73-71=217	+1
T8	(West Germany) Bernhard Langer	70-69-78=217	+1
T8	(United States) Tom Purtzer	76-66-75=217	+1
T8	(Zimbabwe) Denis Watson	75-69-73=217	+1
T8	(United States) Fuzzy Zoeller	73-71-73=217	+1

Amateurs: Lewis (+5).

=== Final round ===
Sunday, 18 July 1982

==== Final leaderboard ====
Champion
Silver Medal winner (low amateur)
(a) = amateur
(c) = past champion

Place	Player	Score	To par	Money (£)
1	(United States) Tom Watson (c)	69-71-74-70=284	−4	32,000
T2	(England) Peter Oosterhuis	74-67-74-70=285	−3	19,300
T2	(Zimbabwe) Nick Price	69-69-74-73=285	−3	19,300
T4	(England) Nick Faldo	73-73-71-69=286	−2	11,000
T4	(Japan) Masahiro Kuramoto	71-73-71-71=286	−2	11,000
T4	(United States) Tom Purtzer	76-66-75-69=286	−2	11,000
T4	(Republic of Ireland) Des Smyth	70-69-74-73=286	−2	11,000
T8	(Scotland) Sandy Lyle	74-66-73-74=287	−1	8,750
T8	(United States) Fuzzy Zoeller	73-71-73-70=287	−1	8,750
T10	(United States) Bobby Clampett	67-66-78-77=288	E	7,350
T10	(United States) Jack Nicklaus (c)	77-70-72-69=288	E	7,350

Leaderboard below the top 10
Place	Player	Score	To par	Money (£)
12	(Scotland) Sam Torrance	73-72-73-71=289	+1	8,820
T13	(Spain) Seve Ballesteros (c)	71-75-73-71=290	+2	7,560
T13	(West Germany) Bernhard Langer	70-69-78-73=290	+2	7,560
T15	(United States) Ben Crenshaw	74-75-72-70=291	+3	5,460
T15	(United States) Raymond Floyd	74-73-77-67=291	+3	5,460
T15	(United States) Curtis Strange	72-73-76-70=291	+3	5,460
T15	(Zimbabwe) Denis Watson	75-69-73-74=291	+3	5,460
19	(Scotland) Ken Brown	70-71-79-72=292	+4	4,060
T20	(Japan) Isao Aoki	75-69-75-74=293	+5	3,500
T20	(Japan) Tōru Nakamura	77-68-77-71=293	+5	3,500
T22	(Spain) José María Cañizares	71-72-79-72=294	+6	3,080
T22	(United States) Johnny Miller (c)	71-76-75-72=294	+6	3,080
T22	(United States) Bill Rogers (c)	73-70-76-75=294	+6	3,080
T25	(Scotland) Bernard Gallacher	75-71-74-75=295	+7	2,730
T25	(Australia) Graham Marsh	76-76-72-71=295	+7	2,730
T27	(Australia) David Graham	70-73-76-77=296	+8	2,240
T27	(United States) Jay Haas	78-72-75-71=296	+8	2,240
T27	(Australia) Greg Norman	73-75-76-72=296	+8	2,240
T27	(United States) Arnold Palmer (c)	71-73-78-74=296	+8	2,240
T27	(United States) Lee Trevino (c)	78-72-71-75=296	+8	2,240
T32	(Scotland) Mike Miller	74-72-78-73=297	+9	1,680
T32	(United States) Larry Nelson	77-69-77-74=297	+9	1,680
T32	(England) Mark Thomas	72-74-75-76=297	+9	1,680
T35	(Scotland) Brian Barnes	75-69-76-78=298	+10	1,166
T35	(Republic of Ireland) Eamonn Darcy	75-73-78-72=298	+10	1,166
T35	(United States) Jack Ferenz	76-69-80-73=298	+10	1,166
T35	(England) David A. Russell	72-72-76-78=298	+10	1,166
T35	(United States) Craig Stadler	71-74-79-74=298	+10	1,166
T35	(England) Paul Way	72-75-78-73=298	+10	1,166
41	(South Africa) Harold Henning	74-74-76-75=299	+11	910
T42	(England) Neil Coles	73-73-72-82=300	+12	910
T42	(Australia) Terry Gale	76-74-75-75=300	+12	910
T42	(England) Malcolm Lewis (a)	74-74-77-75=300	+12	0
T42	(South Africa) Gary Player (c)	75-74-76-75=300	+12	910
T42	(Australia) Bob Shearer	73-72-81-74=300	+12	910
T47	(South Africa) Tienie Britz	81-70-74-76=301	+13	910
T47	(England) Roger Chapman	75-76-74-76=301	+13	910
T47	(Scotland) Bill Longmuir	77-72-77-75=301	+13	910
T47	(England) Brian Waites	75-77-73-76=301	+13	910
T51	(England) Mark James	74-73-79-76=302	+14	863
T51	(Spain) Manuel Piñero	75-75-74-78=302	+14	863
T51	(Taiwan) Hsu Sheng-san	75-75-75-77=302	+14	863
T54	(Republic of Ireland) Mark McNulty	76-74-76-77=303	+15	840
T54	(England) Martin Poxon	74-70-78-81=303	+15	840
T54	(England) Peter Townsend	76-73-76-78=303	+15	840
T54	(England) Keith Waters	73-78-71-81=303	+15	840
58	(England) Philip Harrison	78-74-74-78=304	+16	840
59	(England) Michael King	73-78-74-80=305	+17	840
60	(Australia) Michael Cahill	73-76-77-80=306	+18	840
2nd CUT	(United States) Rex Caldwell	84-68-75=227	+11	560
2nd CUT	(England) Peter Dawson	78-73-76=227	+11	560
2nd CUT	(South Africa) Jeff Hawkes	79-73-75=227	+11	560
2nd CUT	(England) Warren Humphreys	76-75-76=227	+11	560
2nd CUT	(United States) Tom Weiskopf (c)	79-73-75=227	+11	560
2nd CUT	(United States) Chip Beck	75-73-80=228	+12	560
2nd CUT	(South Africa) John Bland	80-72-76=228	+12	560
2nd CUT	(England) Paul Hoad	73-79-76=228	+12	560
2nd CUT	(Australia) Brian Jones	81-71-76=228	+12	560
2nd CUT	(United States) Tom Kite	73-76-79=228	+12	560
2nd CUT	(Belgium) Joey Rassett	76-76-76=228	+12	560
2nd CUT	(South Africa) Hugh Baiocchi	77-75-77=229	+13	525
2nd CUT	(England) Jeremy Bennett	74-73-82=229	+13	525
2nd CUT	(Spain) Antonio Garrido	75-77-77=229	+13	525
2nd CUT	(England) Tommy Horton	77-73-79=229	+13	525
2nd CUT	(United States) Gil Morgan	74-74-81=229	+13	525
2nd CUT	(Australia) Vaughan Somers	78-73-78=229	+13	525
2nd CUT	(England) Brian Evans	77-72-81=230	+14	525
2nd CUT	(United States) Hubert Green	76-75-79=230	+14	525
2nd CUT	(Scotland) David Matthew	76-76-78=230	+14	525
2nd CUT	(England) Gordon J. Brand	77-75-79=231	+15	525
2nd CUT	(New Zealand) Simon Owen	73-77-81=231	+15	525
2nd CUT	(Wales) Ian Woosnam	78-73-80=231	+15	525
2nd CUT	(Zimbabwe) Tony Johnstone	75-77-80=232	+16	525
2nd CUT	(England) Peter Tupling	75-77-81=233	+17	525
2nd CUT	(England) Simon Bishop	76-75-83=234	+18	525
2nd CUT	(United States) Danny Edwards	71-81-86=238	+22	525
1st CUT	(New Zealand) Bob Charles (c)	79-74=153	+9	315
1st CUT	(England) Steve Cipa	75-78=153	+9	315
1st CUT	(England) Denny Hepler	78-75=153	+9	315
1st CUT	(England) Tony Jacklin (c)	77-76=153	+9	315
1st CUT	(United States) Mark Johnson	76-77=153	+9	315
1st CUT	(Scotland) Brian Marchbank	76-77=153	+9	315
1st CUT	(England) Carl Mason	78-75=153	+9	315
1st CUT	(Scotland) Andrew Oldcorn (a)	79-74=153	+9	0
1st CUT	(England) Jonathan Plaxton (a)	77-76=153	+9	0
1st CUT	(Nepal) Denis Scanlan	78-75=153	+9	315
1st CUT	(United States) Ed Sneed	76-77=153	+9	315
1st CUT	(United States) Hal Sutton	80-73=153	+9	315
1st CUT	(Mexico) Peter Berry	79-75=154	+10	315
1st CUT	(Scotland) Gordon Brand Jnr	75-79=154	+10	315
1st CUT	(Australia) Mike Ferguson	76-78=154	+10	315
1st CUT	(Brazil) Jaime Gonzalez	78-76=154	+10	315
1st CUT	(United States) Robert Jamieson	74-80=154	+10	315
1st CUT	(England) Steve Rooke	76-78=154	+10	315
1st CUT	(Australia) Ian Stanley (a)	77-77=154	+10	0
1st CUT	(England) Andrew Stubbs (a)	74-80=154	+10	0
1st CUT	(Mexico) Martyn Thompson	78-76=154	+10	315
1st CUT	(England) Maurice Bembridge	79-76=155	+11	315
1st CUT	(England) Pip Elson	79-76=155	+11	315
1st CUT	(United States) Joe Inman	79-76=155	+11	315
1st CUT	(United States) Bruce Lietzke	77-78=155	+11	315
1st CUT	(Scotland) Jim McAlister	79-76=155	+11	315
1st CUT	(Republic of Ireland) Christy O'Connor Jnr	76-79=155	+11	315
1st CUT	(United States) Greg Powers	77-78=155	+11	315
1st CUT	(England) Graham Walker	80-75=155	+11	315
1st CUT	(England) John Wilkinson	83-72=155	+11	315
1st CUT	(England) Paul Bradley	75-81=156	+12	315
1st CUT	(England) Gary Broadbent (a)	80-76=156	+12	0
1st CUT	(Northern Ireland) David Feherty	81-75=156	+12	315
1st CUT	(England) David Jagger	75-81=156	+12	315
1st CUT	(England) Mike McLean	81-75=156	+12	315
1st CUT	(Sweden) Magnus Persson (a)	83-73=156	+12	0
1st CUT	(Scotland) Andy Rose (a)	79-77=156	+12	0
1st CUT	(England) John Thomson (a)	79-77=156	+12	0
1st CUT	(Spain) Manuel Calero	83-74=157	+13	315
1st CUT	(England) John Fowler	76-81=157	+13	315
1st CUT	(United States) Bill Pelham	78-79=157	+13	315
1st CUT	(England) David Ray (a)	84-73=157	+13	0
1st CUT	(England) Ross Whitehead	78-79=157	+13	315
1st CUT	(England) Peter Cowan	83-75=158	+14	315
1st CUT	(Australia) Rodger Davis	79-79=158	+14	315
1st CUT	(England) Andrew Murray	78-80=158	+14	315
1st CUT	(England) Howard Clark	79-80=159	+15	315
1st CUT	(Scotland) Steve Martin	81-78=159	+15	315
1st CUT	(Sweden) Per Anderrson (a)	81-79=160	+16	0
1st CUT	(England) Denis Durnian	82-78=160	+16	315
1st CUT	(England) Hedley Muscroft	81-79=160	+16	315
1st CUT	(West Germany) Carlo Knauss	79-82=161	+17	315
1st CUT	(Scotland) Keith Lobban	81-80=161	+17	315
1st CUT	(Scotland) Ian Young (a)	82-79=161	+17	0
1st CUT	(England) David Williams	81-81=162	+18	315
1st CUT	(Northern Ireland) Jimmy Heggarty	81-82=163	+19	315
1st CUT	(England) Michael Higgins (a)	83-80=163	+19	0
1st CUT	(England) Nick Job	83-80=163	+19	315
1st CUT	(England) Chris Poxon (a)	80-83=163	+19	0
1st CUT	(United States) Nathaniel Crosby (a)	82-84=166	+22	0
WD	(Scotland) Garry Hay	75	+3	315
WD	(Republic of Ireland) John O'Leary	80	+8	315
WD	(United States) Jerry Pate	81	+9	315

Amateurs: Lewis (+12)

- The exchange rate at the time was approximately 1.74 dollars (US) per pound sterling.

==== Scorecard ====
Hole	1	2	3	4	5	6	7	8	9	10	11	12	13	14	15	16	17	18
Par	4	4	4	5	3	5	4	3	4	4	5	4	4	3	4	5	3	4
(United States) Watson	−2	−2	−2	−3	−3	−3	−3	−3	−3	−3	−5	−5	−5	−5	−4	−4	−4	−4
(England) Oosterhuis	−1	−1	−1	−1	E	−1	−1	−2	−2	−2	−1	−1	−1	−2	−2	−2	−2	−3
(Zimbabwe) Price	−5	−6	−6	−5	−5	−5	−6	−5	−4	−5	−6	−7	−6	−6	−4	−4	−3	−3

Cumulative tournament scores, relative to par

Eagle	Birdie	Bogey	Double bogey
