= 1973 Open Championship =

Coordinates: 55.5326°N 4.6507°W

Tournament information
- Dates: 11–14 July 1973
- Location: Troon, South Ayrshire, Scotland
- Course(s): Troon Golf Club, Old Course
- Tour(s): European Tour; PGA Tour

Statistics
- Par: 72
- Length: 7,064 yards (6,459 m)
- Field: 153 players 84 after 1st cut 60 after 2nd cut
- Cut: 152 (+8) (1st cut); 224 (+8) (2nd cut)
- Prize fund: £50,000 $130,000
- Winner's share: £5,500 $14,300

Champion
- (United States) Tom Weiskopf
- 276 (−12)

Location in Scotland
Location in South Ayrshire, Scotland

The 1973 Open Championship was the 102nd Open Championship, played 11–14 July at Troon Golf Club in Troon, Scotland. Tom Weiskopf won his only major championship by three strokes over runners-up Neil Coles and Johnny Miller, the winner of the U.S. Open a month earlier. Weiskopf was a wire-to-wire winner and his four-round total of 12-under-par 276 matched the then-existing Open Championship record set by Arnold Palmer on the same course in 1962.

Gene Sarazen, 71, made a hole-in-one in the first round at the famous 8th hole, a 126-yard (115 m) par-3 named the "Postage Stamp," due to its small green. Lee Trevino's bid for a third straight Open fell short, thirteen strokes back in a tie for tenth place.

This was the course's last Open Championship under the name Troon Golf Club; it became Royal Troon Golf Club five years later in 1978, and next hosted in 1982.

== Course ==
Old Course

Hole	Name	Yards	Par	Hole	Name	Yards	Par
1	Seal	362	4	10	Sandhills	437	4
2	Black Rock	391	4	11	The Railway	481	5
3	Gyaws	381	4	12	The Fox	432	4
4	Dunure	556	5	13	Burmah	468	4
5	Greenan	210	3	14	Alton	180	3
6	Turnberry	577	5	15	Crosbie	457	4
7	Tel-el-Kebir	389	4	16	Well	542	5
8	Postage Stamp	126	3	17	Rabbit	223	3
9	The Monk	427	4	18	Craigend	425	4
Out		3,419	36	In		3,645	36
Source:				Total		7,064	72

Lengths of the course for previous Opens (since 1950):

- 1962: 7,045 yards (6,442 m), par 72
- 1950: 6,583 yards (6,019 m), par 70

Opens from 1962 through 1989 played the 11th hole as a par-5.

== Round summaries ==
=== First round ===
Wednesday, 11 July 1973

Place	Player	Score	To par
1	(United States) Tom Weiskopf	68	−4
T2	(United States) Jack Nicklaus	69	−3
T2	(United States) Bert Yancey	69	−3
4	(United States) Johnny Miller	70	−2
T5	(England) Peter Butler	71	−1
T5	(England) Neil Coles	71	−1
T5	(Australia) Bruce Crampton	71	−1
T5	(United States) Lanny Wadkins	71	−1
T5	(England) Peter Wilcock	71	−1
T10	(South Africa) Vin Baker	72	E
T10	(Argentina) Roberto De Vicenzo	72	E
T10	(Australia) Bruce Devlin	72	E
T10	(United States) Arnold Palmer	72	E
T10	(United States) Chi-Chi Rodríguez	72	E
T10	(England) David J. Russell (a)	72	E

=== Second round ===
Thursday, 12 July 1973

Place	Player	Score	To par
1	(United States) Tom Weiskopf	68-67=135	−9
T2	(United States) Johnny Miller	70-68=138	−6
T2	(United States) Bert Yancey	69-69=138	−6
4	(United States) Jack Nicklaus	69-70=139	−5
5	(Republic of Ireland) Christy O'Connor Snr	73-68=141	−3
6	(Scotland) Bernard Gallacher	73-69=142	−2
T7	(Scotland) Brian Barnes	76-67=143	−1
T7	(England) Peter Butler	71-72=143	−1
T7	(England) Neil Coles	71-72=143	−1
T10	(New Zealand) Bob Charles	73-71=144	E
T10	(United States) Lanny Wadkins	71-73=144	E

Amateurs: Edwards (+6), Homer (+7), Russell (+7), R. Foster (+8),
Stuart (+9), Milne (+10), Hedges (+13), Bonallack (+15), Sym (+15), Burch (+16), Eyles (+18), James (+24)

=== Third round ===
Friday, 13 July 1973

Place	Player	Score	To par
1	(United States) Tom Weiskopf	68-67-71=206	−10
2	(United States) Johnny Miller	70-68-69=207	−9
3	(United States) Bert Yancey	69-69-73=211	−5
T4	(Scotland) Brian Barnes	76-67-70=213	−3
T4	(England) Neil Coles	71-72-70=213	−3
6	(United States) Lanny Wadkins	71-73-70=214	−2
T7	(United States) Jack Nicklaus	69-70-76=215	−1
T7	(Republic of Ireland) Christy O'Connor Snr	73-68-74=215	−1
9	(England) Doug McClelland	76-71-69=216	E
T10	(England) Peter Butler	71-72-74=217	+1
T10	(New Zealand) Bob Charles	73-71-73=217	+1
T10	(Scotland) Bernard Gallacher	73-69-75=217	+1

Amateurs: Edwards (+5), R. Foster (+10), Russell (+12), Homer (+16)

=== Final round ===
Saturday, 14 July 1973

Place	Player	Score	To par	Money (£)
1	(United States) Tom Weiskopf	68-67-71-70=276	−12	5,500
T2	(England) Neil Coles	71-72-70-66=279	−9	3,625
T2	(United States) Johnny Miller	70-68-69-72=279	−9	3,625
4	(United States) Jack Nicklaus	69-70-76-65=280	−8	2,750
5	(United States) Bert Yancey	69-69-73-70=281	−7	2,450
6	(England) Peter Butler	71-72-74-69=286	−2	2,150
T7	(New Zealand) Bob Charles	73-71-73-71=288	E	1,717
T7	(Republic of Ireland) Christy O'Connor Snr	73-68-74-73=288	E	1,717
T7	(United States) Lanny Wadkins	71-73-70-74=288	E	1,717
T10	(Scotland) Brian Barnes	76-67-70-76=289	+1	1,350
T10	(United States) Gay Brewer	76-71-72-70=289	+1	1,350
T10	(South Africa) Harold Henning	73-73-73-70=289	+1	1,350
T10	(United States) Lee Trevino	75-73-73-68=289	+1	1,350

Amateurs: Edwards (+8)

- The exchange rate at the time was approximately 2.54 dollars (US) per pound sterling.
