= 1950 Open Championship =

Coordinates: 55.532°N 4.651°W

Tournament information
- Dates: 5–7 July 1950
- Location: Troon, South Ayrshire, Scotland
- Course(s): Troon Golf Club; Old Course

Statistics
- Par: 70
- Length: 6,583 yards (6,019 m)
- Field: 93 players, 35 after cut
- Cut: 148
- Prize fund: £1,500
- Winner's share: £300

Champion
- (South Africa) Bobby Locke
- 279 (−1)

Location in Scotland
Location in South Ayrshire, Scotland

The 1950 Open Championship was the 79th Open Championship, held 5–7 July at Troon Golf Club in Troon, South Ayrshire, Scotland. Defending champion Bobby Locke of South Africa won the second of his four Open titles, two strokes ahead of runner-up Roberto De Vicenzo of Argentina. His total of 279 was a record for the Open Championship, beating the previous best of 283. It was the second Open Championship at Troon, which had previously hosted the Championship in 1923; it became "Royal Troon" in 1978.

Qualifying took place on 3–4 July, Monday and Tuesday, with 18 holes on the Old Course at Troon and 18 holes on the Lochgreen municipal course. Johnny Bulla led the scoring at 140 with Norman Von Nida next on 141. The field for the Open proper was limited to a maximum of 100 participants and did not include ties. The qualifying score was 153 and 93 players advanced to the first round on Wednesday.

Arthur Lees led after the first round with 68, a shot ahead of playing partner Eddie Whitcombe and Locke. Dai Rees was the 36-hole leader at 139, followed by Bill Branch (140) and Locke (141). Lees and Whitcombe both slipped back after Thursday rounds of 76, and Locke scored 72 after a six at the short fifth hole. The maximum number of players making the cut after 36 holes was again set at 40. Ties for 40th place at 149 did not make the cut and only 35 players advanced to the final two rounds.

After the third round on Friday morning, Locke, Rees, and De Vicenzo were tied for the lead at 211, Branch dropping back after a 78. In the final round that afternoon, De Vicenzo was out in 33 and at the par-3 8th hole (the "Postage Stamp"), he put his tee shot into one of its penalizing bunkers. Finding it to be "plugged" he declared it unplayable and returned to the teeing ground. From there he put his second attempt "stone dead" and holed the short putt. The rules had recently been changed so that there was no penalty stroke for returning to the tee, and he ended up with a par. Coming home he dropped a shot at the tenth, two more at the twelfth and another at the thirteenth, but a good finish gave him a 70 and the clubhouse lead on 281. Locke was also out in 33 and finished with a round of 68 to lead De Vicenzo by two. Rees was the remaining challenger for the championship and he too was out in 33. However, he had a six at the tenth hole and finished with 71 to tie for third place. On a day of low scoring, Eric Moore was out in 32 and finished with 68; Fred Daly and Frank Stranahan both scored 66.

== Course ==
Old Course

Hole	Name	Yards	Par	Hole	Name	Yards	Par
1	Seal	355	4	10	Sandhills	436	4
2	Black Rock	372	4	11	The Railway	326	4
3	Gyaws	378	4	12	The Fox	385	4
4	Dunure	443	4	13	Burmah	400	4
5	Greenan	180	3	14	Alton	170	3
6	Turnberry	580	5	15	Crosbie	450	4
7	Tel-el-Kebir	368	4	16	Well	566	5
8	Postage Stamp	120	3	17	Rabbit	223	3
9	The Monk	427	4	18	Craigend	410	4
Out		3,217	35	In		3,366	35
Source:				Total		6,583	70

Opens from 1962 through 1989 played the 11th hole as a par-5;
4th hole was lengthened and a par-5 since 1962.

== Round summaries ==
=== First round ===
Wednesday, 5 July 1950

Place	Player	Score	To par
1	(England) Arthur Lees	68	−2
T2	(South Africa) Bobby Locke	69	−1
T2	(England) Eddie Whitcombe	69	−1
4	(England) Sam King	70	E
T5	(England) Bill Branch	71	+1
T5	(England) Fred Bullock	71	+1
T5	(Wales) Dai Rees	71	+1
T5	(England) Norman Sutton	71	+1
T5	(Scotland) Hector Thomson	71	+1
T10	(England) Fred Allott	72	+2
T10	(Scotland) David Blair (a)	72	+2
T10	(England) George Boomer	72	+2
T10	(Argentina) Roberto De Vicenzo	72	+2
T10	(England) Max Faulkner	72	+2
T10	(Scotland) John Fallon	72	+2
T10	(England) James Wilson (a)	72	+2

=== Second round ===
Thursday, 6 July 1950

Place	Player	Score	To par
1	(Wales) Dai Rees	71-68=139	−1
2	(England) Bill Branch	71-69=140	E
3	(South Africa) Bobby Locke	69-72=141	+1
T4	(England) Fred Bullock	71-71=142	+2
T4	(England) Max Faulkner	72-70=142	+2
T4	(South Africa) Eric Moore	74-68=142	+2
T7	(England) Fred Allott	72-71=143	+3
T7	(United States) Johnny Bulla	73-70=143	+3
T7	(Argentina) Roberto De Vicenzo	72-71=143	+3
T7	(Scotland) Hector Thomson	71-72=143	+3

=== Third round ===
Friday, 7 July 1950 (morning)

Place	Player	Score	To par
T1	(Argentina) Roberto De Vicenzo	72-71-68=211	+1
T1	(South Africa) Bobby Locke	69-72-70=211	+1
T1	(Wales) Dai Rees	71-68-72=211	+1
T4	(England) Max Faulkner	72-70-70=212	+2
T4	(England) Arthur Lees	68-76-68=212	+2
T6	(England) Fred Bullock	71-71-71=213	+3
T6	(England) Sam King	70-75-68=213	+3
8	(United States) Johnny Bulla	73-70-71=214	+4
9	(South Africa) Eric Moore	74-68-73=215	+5
T10	(Northern Ireland) Fred Daly	75-72-69=216	+6
T10	(Scotland) Hector Thomson	71-72-73=216	+6
T10	(Belgium) Flory Van Donck	73-71-72=216	+6

=== Final round ===
Friday, 7 July 1950 (afternoon)

Place	Player	Score	To par	Money (£)
1	(South Africa) Bobby Locke	69-72-70-68=279	−1	300
2	(Argentina) Roberto De Vicenzo	72-71-68-70=281	+1	200
T3	(Northern Ireland) Fred Daly	75-72-69-66=282	+2	87
T3	(Wales) Dai Rees	71-68-72-71=282	+2	87
T5	(England) Max Faulkner	72-70-70-71=283	+3	35
T5	(South Africa) Eric Moore	74-68-73-68=283	+3	35
T7	(England) Fred Bullock	71-71-71-71=284	+4	20
T7	(England) Arthur Lees	68-76-68-72=284	+4	20
T9	(England) Sam King	70-75-68-73=286	+6	20
T9	(Belgium) Flory Van Donck	73-71-72-70=286	+6	20
T9	(United States) Frank Stranahan (a)	77-70-73-66=286	+6	0

Amateurs: Stranahan (+6), McHale (+10), Blair (+15), Wilson (+19)
