= 1962 Open Championship =

Coordinates: 55.532°N 4.65°W

Tournament information
- Dates: 11–13 July 1962
- Location: Troon, South Ayrshire, Scotland
- Course(s): Troon Golf Club, Old Course

Statistics
- Par: 72
- Length: 7,045 yards (6,442 m)
- Field: 119 players, 39 after cut
- Cut: 152 (+8)
- Prize fund: £8,500 $23,800
- Winner's share: £1,400 $3,920

Champion
- (United States) Arnold Palmer
- 276 (−12)

Location in Scotland
Location in South Ayrshire, Scotland

The 1962 Open Championship was the 91st Open Championship, played from 11 to 13 July at Troon Golf Club in Troon, Scotland. Arnold Palmer won his second consecutive Open, six strokes ahead of runner-up Kel Nagle. It was the sixth of Palmer's seven major titles and the second of the year; he won his third Masters in April.

Qualifying took place on 9–10 July, and entries played 18 holes on the Old Course at Troon Golf Club and 18 holes on the Lochgreen Troon Municipal course. A maximum of 120 players qualified; the qualifying score was 154 and 119 players qualified. Eric Brown of Scotland led the qualifiers with 139, and Palmer was at 143. This was the last Open in which all players had to qualify; in 1963 a system of exemptions for the leading players was introduced. A maximum of 50 players could make the cut to play 36 holes on the final day.

Jack Nicklaus, the U.S. Open champion, competed in his first Open Championship. Following an opening round 80, he rebounded with a 72 to make the cut and tied for 34th place.

The PGA Championship was played the next week (19–22 July) near Philadelphia, Pennsylvania, the first of five times in the 1960s that these two majors were played in consecutive weeks in July.

== Round summaries ==
=== First round ===
Wednesday, 11 July 1962

Place	Player	Score	To par
1	(England) Keith MacDonald	69	−3
2	(Australia) Peter Thomson	70	−2
T3	(Australia) Kel Nagle	71	−1
T3	(United States) Arnold Palmer	71	−1
T5	(Scotland) Doug Beattie	72	E
T5	(Republic of Ireland) Harry Bradshaw	72	E
T5	(England) Peter Butler	72	E
T5	(Spain) Sebastián Miguel	72	E
T5	(Belgium) Donald Swaelens	72	E
T10	(Republic of Ireland) Hugh Boyle	73	+1
T10	(Republic of Ireland) Jimmy Martin	73	+1

=== Second round ===
Thursday, 12 July 1962

A maximum of 50 players could make the cut, but 51 players scored 153 (+9) or better. The 12 players on 153 were therefore excluded and just the 39 who scored 152 (+8) or better qualified for the final day.

Place	Player	Score	To par
1	(United States) Arnold Palmer	71-69=140	−4
2	(Australia) Kel Nagle	71-71=142	−2
T3	(New Zealand) Bob Charles	75-70=145	+1
T3	(Republic of Ireland) Jimmy Martin	73-72=145	+1
T3	(England) Ralph Moffitt	75-70=145	+1
T3	(United States) Phil Rodgers	75-70=145	+1
T7	(England) Peter Alliss	77-69=146	+2
T7	(Wales) Brian Huggett	75-71=146	+2
T7	(England) Keith MacDonald	69-77=146	+2
T10	(Scotland) Doug Beattie	72-75=147	+3
T10	(Republic of Ireland) Harry Bradshaw	72-75=147	+3
T10	(South Africa) Harold Henning	74-73=147	+3
T10	(Scotland) John Panton	74-73=147	+3
T10	(Wales) Dave Thomas	77-70=147	+3
T10	(Australia) Peter Thomson	70-77=147	+3

Amateurs: Green (+7), Cannon (+9), Carr (+9), Saddler (+9), Sinclair (+9), Stuart (+10), Blair (+11), Clark (+11), Edgar (+11),
Shade (+11), Christmas (+12), Foster (+12), Walker (+13), MacCaskill (+17), Wilson (+18), Morrison (+19).

=== Third round ===
Friday, 13 July 1962 - (morning)

Place	Player	Score	To par
1	(United States) Arnold Palmer	71-69-67=207	−9
2	(Australia) Kel Nagle	71-71-70=212	−4
3	(New Zealand) Bob Charles	75-70-70=215	−1
4	(United States) Phil Rodgers	75-70-72=217	+1
5	(Wales) Dave Thomas	77-70-71=218	+2
6	(England) Ralph Moffitt	75-70-74=219	+3
T7	(England) Peter Alliss	77-69-74=220	+4
T7	(Wales) Brian Huggett	75-71-74=220	+4
T9	(Republic of Ireland) Jimmy Martin	73-72-76=221	+5
T9	(United States) Sam Snead	76-73-72=221	+5
T9	(England) Harry Weetman	75-73-73=221	+5
T9	(England) Ross Whitehead	74-75-72=221	+5

=== Final round ===
Friday, 13 July 1962 - (afternoon)

Place	Player	Score	To par	Money (£)
1	(United States) Arnold Palmer	71-69-67-69=276	−12	1,400
2	(Australia) Kel Nagle	71-71-70-70=282	−6	1,000
T3	(Wales) Brian Huggett	75-71-74-69=289	+1	710
T3	(United States) Phil Rodgers	75-70-72-72=289	+1	710
5	(New Zealand) Bob Charles	75-70-70-75=290	+2	475
T6	(United States) Sam Snead	76-73-72-71=292	+4	300
T6	(Australia) Peter Thomson	70-77-75-70=292	+4	300
T8	(England) Peter Alliss	77-69-74-73=293	+5	190
T8	(Wales) Dave Thomas	77-70-71-75=293	+5	190
10	(England) Syd Scott	77-74-75-68=294	+6	145

Amateurs: Green (+20)
