= 2019 Open Championship =

Golf tournament held in 2019 in Northern Ireland

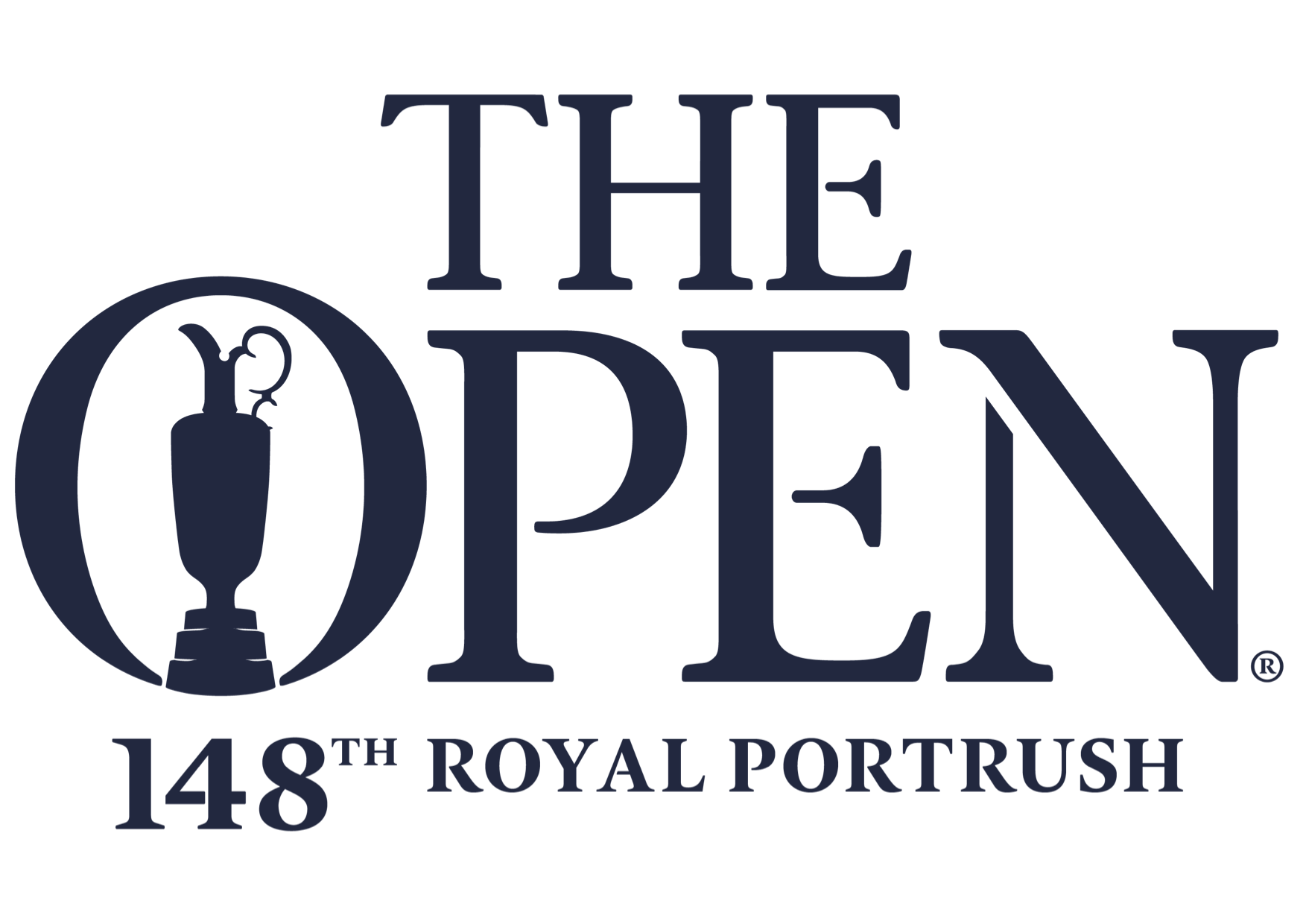

Tournament information
- Dates: 18–21 July 2019
- Location: Portrush, County Antrim, Northern Ireland; 55.200°N 6.635°W
- Courses: Royal Portrush Golf Club; Dunluce Links
- Organized by: The R&A
- Tours: European Tour; PGA Tour; Japan Golf Tour

Statistics
- Par: 71
- Length: 7,344 yards (6,715 m)
- Field: 156 players, 73 after cut
- Cut: 143 (+1)
- Prize fund: $10,750,000 €9,546,221
- Winner's share: $1,935,000 €1,718,320

Champion
- (Republic of Ireland) Shane Lowry
- 269 (−15)

Location map
- Location in the United Kingdom Location in Ireland Location in Northern Ireland

The 2019 Open Championship was the 148th Open Championship, played 18–21 July at Royal Portrush Golf Club in County Antrim, Northern Ireland. It was the second Open Championship at Portrush, which last hosted in 1951, won by Max Faulkner. Royal Portrush saw major alterations in preparation for the tournament, including replacing two of the holes.

Shane Lowry won his first major title by six strokes over Tommy Fleetwood. Ranked 33rd coming into the tournament, Lowry's previous biggest wins were the 2015 WGC-Bridgestone Invitational and the 2019 Abu Dhabi HSBC Championship. Lowry became the second player from the Republic of Ireland to win a major after Pádraig Harrington.

Lowry shot 67 in both the first and second rounds to share the lead with J. B. Holmes after 36 holes. He shot a course record (since the 2016 renovation) 63 in the third round to have a four-stroke lead over Tommy Fleetwood going into the final day. After shooting a 72 in challenging conditions on the last day, Lowry was able to convert a four-shot 54-hole lead into major victory, after failing to do the same at the 2016 U.S. Open at Oakmont. Fleetwood finished solo second for the second time in a major, having previously achieved the feat at the 2018 U.S. Open at Shinnecock Hills.

Major champions Darren Clarke, Graeme McDowell, and Rory McIlroy competed in a major in their native Northern Ireland for the first time. Clarke was given the honour of the opening tee shot and described the event as a watershed moment for Northern Ireland, as hosting was seen as unrealistic during the years when violence ravaged the province. McIlroy was the pre-tournament favourite but shot an 8-over-par 79 in the first round, which included a quadruple bogey eight on the first hole, a double bogey five on the 16th, and a triple bogey seven on the 18th. Despite shooting a 6-under-par 65 in the second round for a two-over-par total, he missed the cut by a single stroke. Clarke also missed the cut, and McDowell finished tied-57th.

Defending champion Francesco Molinari made the cut on the number and finished tied for 11th with a 3-under-par 281. Brooks Koepka finished tied 4th to become the fifth player, after Jordan Spieth, Rickie Fowler, Jack Nicklaus, and Tiger Woods, to finish top-five in all four majors in a single season.

The 36-hole cut was 143 (+1) and better; 73 advanced to the weekend, but no amateurs, so the Silver Medal was not awarded.

== Media ==
The 2019 Open Championship was televised by the Comcast Group in the United Kingdom, Republic of Ireland (both on Sky Sports), and the United States (Golf Channel on its cable service on Thursday and Friday, while on NBC its broadcast service on weekends). It was the fourth year of both channels airing the tournament, but the first since Comcast acquired Sky in late 2018, vertically integrating the two. At the 2019 Players Championship, Comcast integrated the two channels' coverage for the first time since the acquisition, and is expected to feature coverage from both networks' commentators.

== Venue ==
=== Changes to the course for the Open ===
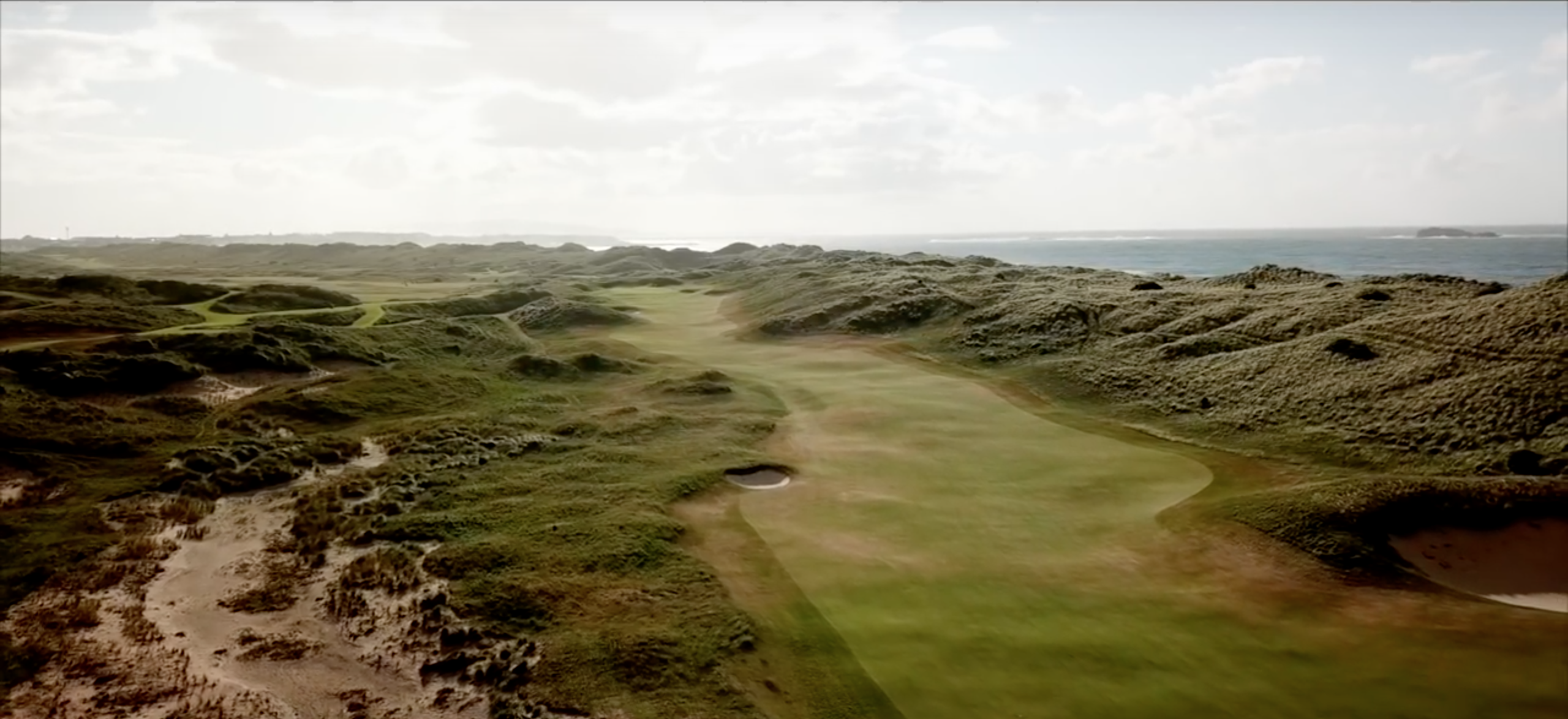
The new 7th hole at Royal Portrush

Specialists Mackenzie & Ebert oversaw changes to the course in preparation for the 2019 Open. The work began in 2015 and it was the first major changes to the Harry Colt designed links since the 1930s. Changes included:

- Removing the 17th and 18th holes. Holes 7 to 16 became holes 9 to 18.
- Two new holes (the current 7th and 8th), which were created with land taken from the Valley course.
- Reshaping some of the greens.
- Nine holes had new tees, there were several new bunkers, and the course was lengthened by 201 yards.

=== Card of the course ===
Dunluce Links – Championship tees

Hole	Name	Yards	Par	Hole	Name	Yards	Par
1	Hughie's	421	4	10	Himalayas	447	4
2	Giant's Grave	574	5	11	P.G. Stevenson's	474	4
3	Islay	177	3	12	Dhu Varren	532	5
4	Fred Daly's	482	4	13	Feather Bed	194	3
5	White Rocks	374	4	14	Causeway	473	4
6	Harry Colt's	194	3	15	Skerries	426	4
7	Curran Point	592	5	16	Calamity Corner	236	3
8	Dunluce	434	4	17	Purgatory	408	4
9	Tavern	432	4	18	Babington's	474	4
Out		3,680	36	In		3,664	35
Source:				Total		7,344	71

If required a three-hole aggregate playoff, followed by sudden death, would have used the 1st, 13th, and 18th holes.

Length of the course for the previous Open:

- 1951: 6,802 yards (6,220 m), par 72

== Field ==
The Open Championship field was made up of 156 players, who gained entry through various exemption criteria and qualifying tournaments. The criteria included past Open champions, recent major winners, top ranked players in the world rankings and from the leading world tours, and winners and high finishers from various designated tournaments, including the Open Qualifying Series; the winners of designated amateur events, including The Amateur Championship and U.S. Amateur, also gained exemption provided they remain an amateur. Anyone not qualifying via exemption, and had a handicap of 0.4 or lower, could gain entry through regional and final qualifying events.

=== Criteria and exemptions ===
Each player is classified according to the first category in which he qualified, but other categories are shown in parentheses. (Note: (a) – indicates the player was an amateur.)

1. The Open Champions aged 60 or under on 21 July 2019

- Stewart Cink (2)
- Darren Clarke (2)
- David Duval
- Ernie Els (2)
- Pádraig Harrington
- Zach Johnson (2)
- Paul Lawrie
- Tom Lehman
- Rory McIlroy (2,3,4,5,10,11,12,15)
- Phil Mickelson (2,4,12,15)
- Francesco Molinari (2,3,4,5,6,12,15)
- Louis Oosthuizen (2,4)
- Jordan Spieth (2,3,4,8,9,15)
- Henrik Stenson (2,4,15)
- Tiger Woods (3,4,9,12,15)
- John Daly and Todd Hamilton did not play.
- Eligible but did not enter: Ian Baker-Finch, Mark Calcavecchia, Ben Curtis, Justin Leonard

2. The Open Champions for 2009–2018

3. Top 10 finishers and ties in the 2018 Open Championship

- Tony Finau (4,12,15)
- Kevin Kisner (4)
- Matt Kuchar (4)
- Eddie Pepperell (4,5)
- Justin Rose (4,5,12,15)
- Xander Schauffele (4,5,12)
- Kevin Chappell did not play due to injury.

4. Top 50 players in the Official World Golf Ranking (OWGR) for Week 21, 2019

- Kiradech Aphibarnrat (5)
- Lucas Bjerregaard (5)
- Keegan Bradley (12)
- Rafa Cabrera-Bello (5)
- Patrick Cantlay (12)
- Paul Casey (12,15)
- Jason Day (10,12)
- Bryson DeChambeau (12,15)
- Matt Fitzpatrick (5)
- Tommy Fleetwood (5,12,15)
- Rickie Fowler (12,15)
- Jim Furyk
- Sergio García (5,9,15)
- Justin Harding
- Tyrrell Hatton (5,15)
- Billy Horschel (12)
- Dustin Johnson (8,12,15)
- Brooks Koepka (8,10,12,15)
- Marc Leishman (12)
- Li Haotong (5)
- Shane Lowry
- Hideki Matsuyama (12)
- Alex Norén (5,6,15)
- Pan Cheng-tsung
- Ian Poulter (15)
- Andrew Putnam
- Jon Rahm (5,12,15)
- Patrick Reed (5,9,12,15)
- Adam Scott
- Webb Simpson (11,12,15)
- Cameron Smith (12)
- Brandt Snedeker
- Justin Thomas (10,12,15)
- Matt Wallace (5)
- Bubba Watson (12,15)
- Gary Woodland (8,12)
- Kevin Na (12) did not play due to a neck injury.

5. Top 30 on the 2018 Race to Dubai

- Alexander Björk
- Jorge Campillo
- Ryan Fox
- Russell Knox
- Alexander Lévy
- Thorbjørn Olesen (15)
- Adrián Otaegui
- Thomas Pieters
- Shubhankar Sharma (16)
- Brandon Stone
- Andy Sullivan
- Lee Westwood
- Danny Willett (9)

6. Last three BMW PGA Championship winners

- Chris Wood

7. Top 5 players, not already exempt, within the top 20 of the 2019 Race to Dubai through the BMW International Open

- Kurt Kitayama
- David Lipsky
- Robert MacIntyre
- Richard Sterne
- Erik van Rooyen

8. Last five U.S. Open winners

9. Last five Masters Tournament winners

10. Last six PGA Championship winners

- Jimmy Walker

11. Last three Players Championship winners

- Kim Si-woo

12. The 30 qualifiers for the 2018 Tour Championship

- Patton Kizzire
- Kyle Stanley
- Aaron Wise

13. Top 5 players, not already exempt, within the top 20 of the 2019 FedEx Cup points list through the Travelers Championship

- Ryan Palmer
- Chez Reavie
- Charles Howell III did not play.

14. Winner of the 2018 Open de Argentina

- Isidro Benítez

15. Playing members of the 2018 Ryder Cup teams

16. Winner of the 2018 Asian Tour Order of Merit

17. Winner of the 2018 PGA Tour of Australasia Order of Merit

- Jake McLeod (OQS Australia)

18. Winner of the 2018–19 Sunshine Tour Order of Merit

- Zander Lombard

19. Winner of the 2018 Japan Open

- Yuki Inamori

20. Winner of the 2019 Asia-Pacific Diamond Cup Golf

- Yosuke Asaji

21. Top 2 on the 2018 Japan Golf Tour Official Money List

- Shugo Imahira
- Shaun Norris

22. Top player, not already exempt, on the 2019 Japan Golf Tour Official Money List through the Japan Golf Tour Championship

- Mikumu Horikawa

23. Winner of the 2018 Senior Open Championship

- Miguel Ángel Jiménez

24. Winner of the 2019 Amateur Championship

- James Sugrue (a)

25. Winner of the 2018 U.S. Amateur

- Viktor Hovland forfeited his exemption by turning professional in June 2019.

26. Winners of the 2019 European Amateur

- Matti Schmid (a)

27. Recipient of the 2018 Mark H. McCormack Medal

- Braden Thornberry forfeited his exemption by turning professional in December 2018.

28. Winner of the 2018 Asia-Pacific Amateur Championship

- Takumi Kanaya (a)

=== Open Qualifying Series ===
The Open Qualifying Series (OQS) consisted of twelve events from the six major tours and the Korean Tour. Places were available to the leading players (not otherwise exempt) who finished in the top n and ties. In the event of ties, positions went to players ranked highest according to that week's OWGR.

Location	Tournament	Date	Spots	Top	Qualifiers
Australia	Emirates Australian Open	18 Nov	3	10	Abraham Ancer, Jake McLeod (17), Dimitrios Papadatos
Africa	South African Open	9 Dec	3	10	Romain Langasque, Oliver Wilson: Charl Schwartzel did not play due to a wrist injury.
Singapore	SMBC Singapore Open	20 Jan	4	12	Yoshinori Fujimoto, Jazz Janewattananond, Prom Meesawat, Mun Do-yeob
United States	Arnold Palmer Invitational	10 Mar	3	10	Im Sung-jae, Kang Sung-hoon, Keith Mitchell
Japan	Mizuno Open	2 Jun	4	12	Gunn Charoenkul, Yuta Ikeda, Chan Kim, Park Sang-hyun
Canada	RBC Canadian Open	9 Jun	3	10	Adam Hadwin, Graeme McDowell: Only two eligible players finished in the top 10.
Korea	Kolon Korea Open	23 Jun	2	8	Hwang Inn-choon, Jang Dong-kyu
Spain	Estrella Damm N.A. Andalucía Masters	30 Jun	3	10	Adri Arnaus, Christiaan Bezuidenhout, Mike Lorenzo-Vera
United States	Rocket Mortgage Classic	30 Jun	2	8	Nate Lashley, Doc Redman
Ireland	Dubai Duty Free Irish Open	7 Jul	3	10	Robert Rock, Paul Waring, Bernd Wiesberger
Scotland	Aberdeen Standard Investments Scottish Open	14 Jul	3	10	Nino Bertasio, Benjamin Hébert, Andrew Johnston
United States	John Deere Classic	14 Jul	1	5	Dylan Frittelli

=== Final Qualifying ===
The Final Qualifying events were played on 2 July at four courses covering Scotland and the North-West, Central and South-coast regions of England. Three qualifying places were available at each location, with 72 golfers competing at each. Sam Locke and Ashton Turner were successful at Final Qualifying for the second consecutive year. Brandon Wu was exempt from regional qualifying because he was ranked in the top ten in the World Amateur Golf Ranking, while Tom Thurloway was exempted by winning the 2018 English Amateur closed championship. Other qualifiers were exempted from regional qualifying by virtue of a top 1000 Official World Golf Ranking at the date of entry.

Location	Qualifiers (Note: (R) – indicates a golfer who came through Regional Qualifying.)
Fairmont St Andrews	Sam Locke, Connor Syme, Brandon Wu (a)
Notts (Hollinwell)	Tom Thurloway (a), Ashton Turner, Andrew Wilson (R)
Prince's	Austin Connelly, Curtis Knipes (a) (R), Callum Shinkwin
St Annes Old Links	Matthew Baldwin, Garrick Porteous, Jack Senior

=== Alternates ===
To make up the full field of 156, additional places were allocated in ranking order from the Official World Golf Ranking at the time that these places were made available by the Championship Committee. The first 14 alternates were added using the week 25 rankings on 26 June; two of those declined spots and were replaced by the next two alternates.

From the Week 25 (week ending 23 June) Official World Golf Ranking:

- An Byeong-hun (ranked 53)
- J. B. Holmes (54)
- Emiliano Grillo (57)
- ~~Scott Piercy~~ (59) (Note: Piercy and Moore did not play; they were replaced by Pavan and Korhonen.)
- Branden Grace (60)
- Luke List (67)
- Jason Kokrak (70)
- ~~Ryan Moore~~ (75)
- Tom Lewis (76)
- Charley Hoffman (78)
- Joost Luiten (79)
- Lucas Glover (80)
- Joel Dahmen (81)
- Corey Conners (82)
- Andrea Pavan (83)
- Mikko Korhonen (85)

From the Week 27 (week ending 7 July) Official World Golf Ranking:

- Joaquín Niemann (79) (Note: Niemann replaced Todd Hamilton.)
- Kevin Streelman (85) (Note: Streelman replaced John Daly.)
- Rory Sabbatini (86) (Note: Sabbatini replaced Kevin Na.)
- Brian Harman (88) (Note: Harman replaced Charles Howell III.)

== Weather ==
- Thursday: Mostly cloudy with intermittent showers. High of 64 °F (18 °C). Winds WSW 10–15 mph (16–24 km/h) with gusts of 20–25 mph (32–40 km/h).
- Friday: Mostly cloudy with occasional rain showers. High of 66 °F (19 °C). Winds NNE 5–10 mph (8–16 km/h).
- Saturday: Cloudy with periods of sunshine. High of 66 °F (19 °C). Winds WNW 7–10 mph (11–16 km/h) with gusts of 18–22 mph (29–35 km/h).
- Sunday: Due to expected inclement weather, final round tee times ran from 7:32 a.m. to 1:47 p.m. Rainy with periods of heavy rain. High of 66 °F (19 °C). Winds SSW 17–20 mph (27–32 km/h) with gusts of 30–35 mph (48–56 km/h).

== Round summaries ==
=== First round ===
Thursday, 18 July 2019

Brooks Koepka, winner of four of the last ten majors, shot a three-under 68 and was two strokes off the lead, tied for third with twelve others. Tiger Woods hit his highest first round score in the Open, a seven-over 78. J. B. Holmes opened with 66 for a one-shot lead over early leader Shane Lowry. It was the second time he'd led in a major championship, the other time being the second round of the 2008 PGA Championship at Oakland Hills. Rory McIlroy shot an 8-over-par 79 which included a quadruple bogey eight on the first hole, a double bogey five on the 16th and a triple bogey seven on the 18th. Two weeks after his win at the Dubai Duty Free Irish Open, Jon Rahm finished two shots off the first-round lead.

Place	Player	Score	To par
1	(United States) J. B. Holmes	66	−5
2	(Republic of Ireland) Shane Lowry	67	−4
T3	(Thailand) Kiradech Aphibarnrat	68	−3
T3	(United States) Tony Finau	68	−3
T3	(England) Tommy Fleetwood	68	−3
T3	(New Zealand) Ryan Fox	68	−3
T3	(South Africa) Dylan Frittelli	68	−3
T3	(Spain) Sergio García	68	−3
T3	(England) Tyrrell Hatton	68	−3
T3	(United States) Brooks Koepka	68	−3
T3	(Scotland) Robert MacIntyre	68	−3
T3	(Sweden) Alex Norén	68	−3
T3	(Spain) Jon Rahm	68	−3
T3	(United States) Webb Simpson	68	−3
T3	(England) Lee Westwood	68	−3

=== Second round ===
Friday, 19 July 2019

After round two, Shane Lowry and J. B. Holmes shared the lead on eight under. Brooks Koepka sat at tied-8th, the 12th consecutive major he'd been in the top 20. Four players, Justin Harding (T5), Xander Schauffele (T18), Kevin Streelman (T48) and Rory McIlroy (MC), posted a second round 6-under-par 65, the current course record (since renovation). 73 professionals and no amateurs made the cut line of 143 (+1). McIlroy missed the cut by one stroke, for the first time since 2013. Tiger Woods and Phil Mickelson both missed the cut, the first time this had happened in 83 majors. Local resident Graeme McDowell, and defending champion, Francesco Molinari, made the cut on number.

Place	Player	Score	To par
T1	(United States) J. B. Holmes	66-68=134	−8
T1	(Republic of Ireland) Shane Lowry	67-67=134	−8
T3	(England) Tommy Fleetwood	68-67=135	−7
T3	(England) Lee Westwood	68-67=135	−7
T5	(South Africa) Justin Harding	71-65=136	−6
T5	(England) Justin Rose	69-67=136	−6
T5	(Australia) Cameron Smith	70-66=136	−6
T8	(South Africa) Dylan Frittelli	68-69=137	−5
T8	(United States) Brooks Koepka	68-69=137	−5
T8	(United States) Andrew Putnam	70-67=137	−5
T8	(United States) Jordan Spieth	70-67=137	−5

Amateurs: Kanaya (+2), Sugrue (+2), Schmid (+5), Wu (+7), Knipes (+9), Thurloway (+14)

=== Third round ===
Saturday, 20 July 2019

Shane Lowry shot an 8-under-par 63 to break the course record since it was remodeled in 2016. His 197 set a new 54-hole scoring record at the Open, beating the 198 set by Tom Lehman in 1996 at Royal Lytham & St. Annes. He became the 12th player since 2000 to be leading in a major by four or more strokes, with only three of them failing to go on and win, including Lowry himself at the 2016 U.S. Open. Lee Westwood sat tied-6th in his 82nd major start, which is the second highest number of major starts without a victory, with only Jay Haas (87) having more. The light afternoon winds favoured the later starters, and led to lower scores than in the first two days.

Place	Player	Score	To par
1	(Republic of Ireland) Shane Lowry	67-67-63=197	−16
2	(England) Tommy Fleetwood	68-67-66=201	−12
3	(United States) J. B. Holmes	66-68-69=203	−10
T4	(United States) Brooks Koepka	68-69-67=204	−9
T4	(England) Justin Rose	69-67-68=204	−9
T6	(United States) Rickie Fowler	70-69-66=205	−8
T6	(England) Lee Westwood	68-67-70=205	−8
T8	(United States) Tony Finau	68-70-68=206	−7
T8	(Spain) Jon Rahm	68-70-68=206	−7
T8	(United States) Jordan Spieth	70-67-69=206	−7
T8	(England) Danny Willett	74-67-65=206	−7

=== Final round ===
Sunday, 21 July 2019

==== Summary ====
Sunday's tee times were moved forward due to the adverse weather forecast. The first tee time for the final round at Royal Portrush was at 7:32am BST, with the two leaders beginning their final round at 1:47pm. Shane Lowry shot a 1-over-par 72, with only Tony Finau scoring lower (71) out of the players in the top 10 after round 3. It meant Lowry won with a six-shot margin ahead of Tommy Fleetwood, the highest winning margin in a major since Martin Kaymer in the 2014 U.S. Open. Lowry had a clear lead throughout the round, and was generally praised for his composure in testing weather conditions, with some remarking about the similarity to his 2009 Irish Open win when he still had amateur status. J. B. Holmes started the day at 10-under-par in solo third place, he shot a 16-over 87 to finish tied for 67th at 6-over-par.

==== Final leaderboard ====
Champion
(a) = amateur
(c) = past champion

Note: Top 10 and ties qualify for the 2020 Open Championship; top 4 and ties qualify for the 2020 Masters Tournament

Place	Player	Score	To par	Money ($)
1	(Republic of Ireland) Shane Lowry	67-67-63-72=269	−15	1,935,000
2	(England) Tommy Fleetwood	68-67-66-74=275	−9	1,120,000
3	(United States) Tony Finau	68-70-68-71=277	−7	718,000
T4	(United States) Brooks Koepka	68-69-67-74=278	−6	503,500
T4	(England) Lee Westwood	68-67-70-73=278	−6	503,500
T6	(United States) Rickie Fowler	70-69-66-74=279	−5	313,000
T6	(England) Tyrrell Hatton	68-71-71-69=279	−5	313,000
T6	(Scotland) Robert MacIntyre	68-72-71-68=279	−5	313,000
T6	(England) Danny Willett	74-67-65-73=279	−5	313,000
10	(United States) Patrick Reed	71-67-71-71=280	−4	223,000

Leaderboard below the top 10
Place	Player	Score	To par	Money ($)
T11	(England) Tom Lewis	75-68-68-70=281	−3	171,700
T11	(Italy) Francesco Molinari (c)	74-69-72-66=281	−3	171,700
T11	(Sweden) Alex Norén	68-71-68-74=281	−3	171,700
T11	(Spain) Jon Rahm	68-70-68-75=281	−3	171,700
T11	(United States) Justin Thomas	71-70-68-72=281	−3	171,700
T16	(Denmark) Lucas Bjerregaard	70-68-74-70=282	−2	126,313
T16	(New Zealand) Ryan Fox	68-75-70-69=282	−2	126,313
T16	(South Korea) Park Sang-hyun	69-72-68-73=282	−2	126,313
T16	(Slovakia) Rory Sabbatini	70-70-71-71=282	−2	126,313
T20	(United States) Stewart Cink (c)	74-68-71-70=283	−1	91,350
T20	(England) Matt Fitzpatrick	71-69-70-73=283	−1	91,350
T20	(United States) Lucas Glover	72-69-71-71=283	−1	91,350
T20	(South Africa) Louis Oosthuizen (c)	70-72-72-69=283	−1	91,350
T20	(United States) Doc Redman	71-71-71-70=283	−1	91,350
T20	(England) Justin Rose	69-67-68-79=283	−1	91,350
T20	(Australia) Cameron Smith	70-66-71-76=283	−1	91,350
T20	(United States) Jordan Spieth (c)	70-67-69-77=283	−1	91,350
T20	(Sweden) Henrik Stenson (c)	70-69-68-76=283	−1	91,350
T20	(South Africa) Erik van Rooyen	70-68-72-73=283	−1	91,350
T30	(United States) Kevin Kisner	70-71-70-73=284	E	69,875
T30	(United States) Webb Simpson	68-71-71-74=284	E	69,875
T32	(South Korea) An Byeong-hun	73-67-70-75=285	+1	56,278
T32	(Thailand) Kiradech Aphibarnrat	68-73-77-67=285	+1	56,278
T32	(South Africa) Ernie Els (c)	71-69-72-73=285	+1	56,278
T32	(South Africa) Dylan Frittelli	68-69-70-78=285	+1	56,278
T32	(United States) Jason Kokrak	74-69-74-68=285	+1	56,278
T32	(Netherlands) Joost Luiten	73-69-71-72=285	+1	56,278
T32	(United States) Andrew Putnam	70-67-70-78=285	+1	56,278
T32	(Austria) Bernd Wiesberger	70-71-74-70=285	+1	56,278
T32	(England) Andrew Wilson	76-67-71-71=285	+1	56,278
T41	(United States) Patrick Cantlay	70-71-71-74=286	+2	36,925
T41	(South Africa) Justin Harding	71-65-74-76=286	+2	36,925
T41	(France) Benjamin Hébert	73-69-73-71=286	+2	36,925
T41	(South Korea) Hwang Inn-choon	72-71-70-73=286	+2	36,925
T41	(Scotland) Russell Knox	70-71-68-77=286	+2	36,925
T41	(United States) Matt Kuchar	70-68-69-79=286	+2	36,925
T41	(United States) Xander Schauffele	74-65-69-78=286	+2	36,925
T41	(England) Callum Shinkwin	70-71-75-70=286	+2	36,925
T41	(United States) Kyle Stanley	75-67-73-71=286	+2	36,925
T41	(United States) Aaron Wise	72-69-71-74=286	+2	36,925
T51	(South Africa) Branden Grace	70-71-75-71=287	+3	28,317
T51	(United States) Charley Hoffman	70-73-70-74=287	+3	28,317
T51	(United States) Dustin Johnson	72-67-72-76=287	+3	28,317
T51	(India) Shubhankar Sharma	70-72-77-68=287	+3	28,317
T51	(England) Matt Wallace	73-70-72-72=287	+3	28,317
T51	(United States) Bubba Watson	72-71-73-71=287	+3	28,317
T57	(England) Paul Casey	72-70-73-73=288	+4	26,467
T57	(Canada) Adam Hadwin	74-69-72-73=288	+4	26,467
T57	(Northern Ireland) Graeme McDowell	73-70-68-77=288	+4	26,467
T57	(Denmark) Thorbjørn Olesen	72-68-77-71=288	+4	26,467
T57	(United States) Kevin Streelman	77-65-74-72=288	+4	26,467
T57	(England) Ashton Turner	69-74-77-68=288	+4	26,467
T63	(United States) Jim Furyk	73-68-75-73=289	+5	25,800
T63	(Finland) Mikko Korhonen	72-69-71-77=289	+5	25,800
T63	(France) Romain Langasque	69-72-70-78=289	+5	25,800
T63	(England) Paul Waring	75-68-75-71=289	+5	25,800
T67	(Japan) Yosuke Asaji	72-71-71-76=290	+6	25,088
T67	(Spain) Sergio García	68-73-71-78=290	+6	25,088
T67	(United States) J. B. Holmes	66-68-69-87=290	+6	25,088
T67	(Belgium) Thomas Pieters	72-68-74-76=290	+6	25,088
71	(England) Eddie Pepperell	70-72-76-74=292	+8	24,625
T72	(Italy) Nino Bertasio	72-71-75-75=293	+9	24,438
T72	(Japan) Yuki Inamori	70-73-70-80=293	+9	24,438
CUT	(Mexico) Abraham Ancer	72-72=144	+2	
CUT	(United States) Keegan Bradley	73-71=144	+2	
CUT	(Australia) Jason Day	70-74=144	+2	
CUT	(United States) Brian Harman	72-72=144	+2	
CUT	(England) Andrew Johnston	73-71=144	+2	
CUT	(Japan) Takumi Kanaya (a)	73-71=144	+2	
CUT	(United States) Nate Lashley	75-69=144	+2	
CUT	(France) Alexander Lévy	73-71=144	+2	
CUT	(Northern Ireland) Rory McIlroy (c)	79-65=144	+2	
CUT	(United States) Keith Mitchell	75-69=144	+2	
CUT	(United States) Brandt Snedeker	74-70=144	+2	
CUT	(Republic of Ireland) James Sugrue (a)	71-73=144	+2	
CUT	(Scotland) Connor Syme	72-72=144	+2	
CUT	(South Africa) Christiaan Bezuidenhout	74-71=145	+3	
CUT	(Northern Ireland) Darren Clarke (c)	71-74=145	+3	
CUT	(Republic of Ireland) Pádraig Harrington (c)	75-70=145	+3	
CUT	(South Korea) Jang Dong-kyu	76-69=145	+3	
CUT	(South Korea) Kim Si-woo	70-75=145	+3	
CUT	(United States) Kurt Kitayama	74-71=145	+3	
CUT	(Japan) Hideki Matsuyama	71-74=145	+3	
CUT	(Spain) Adrián Otaegui	73-72=145	+3	
CUT	(United States) Chez Reavie	73-72=145	+3	
CUT	(England) Chris Wood	73-72=145	+3	
CUT	(United States) Gary Woodland	74-71=145	+3	
CUT	(England) Matthew Baldwin	78-68=146	+4	
CUT	(Japan) Yoshinori Fujimoto	75-71=146	+4	
CUT	(United States) Zach Johnson (c)	74-72=146	+4	
CUT	(South Korea) Kang Sung-hoon	74-72=146	+4	
CUT	(United States) Patton Kizzire	73-73=146	+4	
CUT	(China) Li Haotong	74-72=146	+4	
CUT	(United States) David Lipsky	74-72=146	+4	
CUT	(South Korea) Mun Do-yeob	74-72=146	+4	
CUT	(England) Jack Senior	75-71=146	+4	
CUT	(Mexico) Isidro Benítez	75-72=147	+5	
CUT	(Sweden) Alexander Björk	77-70=147	+5	
CUT	(United States) Bryson DeChambeau	74-73=147	+5	
CUT	(Japan) Mikumu Horikawa	71-76=147	+5	
CUT	(United States) Billy Horschel	76-71=147	+5	
CUT	(Thailand) Jazz Janewattananond	74-73=147	+5	
CUT	(Scotland) Paul Lawrie (c)	75-72=147	+5	
CUT	(Australia) Jake McLeod	76-71=147	+5	
CUT	(Chile) Joaquín Niemann	76-71=147	+5	
CUT	(England) Robert Rock	76-71=147	+5	
CUT	(Germany) Matti Schmid (a)	76-71=147	+5	
CUT	(South Africa) Brandon Stone	72-75=147	+5	
CUT	(Spain) Rafa Cabrera-Bello	73-75=148	+6	
CUT	(Thailand) Gunn Charoenkul	72-76=148	+6	
CUT	(Canada) Corey Conners	72-76=148	+6	
CUT	(United States) Joel Dahmen	76-72=148	+6	
CUT	(South Africa) Zander Lombard	71-77=148	+6	
CUT	(United States) Jimmy Walker	74-74=148	+6	
CUT	(England) Oliver Wilson	73-75=148	+6	
CUT	(United States) Tiger Woods (c)	78-70=148	+6	
CUT	(Spain) Jorge Campillo	76-73=149	+7	
CUT	(United States) Chan Kim	75-74=149	+7	
CUT	(United States) Luke List	73-76=149	+7	
CUT	(South Africa) Shaun Norris	73-76=149	+7	
CUT	(United States) Ryan Palmer	74-75=149	+7	
CUT	(Italy) Andrea Pavan	73-76=149	+7	
CUT	(England) Ian Poulter	75-74=149	+7	
CUT	(United States) Brandon Wu (a)	73-76=149	+7	
CUT	(Spain) Adri Arnaus	75-75=150	+8	
CUT	(Australia) Marc Leishman	78-72=150	+8	
CUT	(France) Mike Lorenzo-Vera	77-73=150	+8	
CUT	(United States) Phil Mickelson (c)	76-74=150	+8	
CUT	(Japan) Yuta Ikeda	76-75=151	+9	
CUT	(South Korea) Im Sung-jae	71-80=151	+9	
CUT	(England) Curtis Knipes (a)	72-79=151	+9	
CUT	(Taiwan) Pan Cheng-tsung	77-74=151	+9	
CUT	(Australia) Adam Scott	78-73=151	+9	
CUT	(South Africa) Richard Sterne	78-73=151	+9	
CUT	(England) Andy Sullivan	76-75=151	+9	
CUT	(Argentina) Emiliano Grillo	73-79=152	+10	
CUT	(Japan) Shugo Imahira	83-69=152	+10	
CUT	(Scotland) Sam Locke	75-77=152	+10	
CUT	(England) Garrick Porteous	79-73=152	+10	
CUT	(Canada) Austin Connelly	75-79=154	+12	
CUT	(United States) Tom Lehman (c)	78-76=154	+12	
CUT	(Thailand) Prom Meesawat	73-81=154	+12	
CUT	(Spain) Miguel Ángel Jiménez	82-73=155	+13	
CUT	(Australia) Dimitrios Papadatos	83-72=155	+13	
CUT	(England) Thomas Thurloway (a)	83-73=156	+14	
CUT	(United States) David Duval (c)	91-78=169	+27	

==== Scorecard ====
Hole	1	2	3	4	5	6	7	8	9	10	11	12	13	14	15	16	17	18
Par	4	5	3	4	4	3	5	4	4	4	4	5	3	4	4	3	4	4
(Republic of Ireland) Lowry	−15	−15	−15	−16	−17	−17	−18	−17	−16	−16	−15	−15	−15	−14	−15	−15	−15	−15
(England) Fleetwood	−12	−12	−11	−11	−12	−12	−12	−11	−11	−10	−10	−11	−11	−9	−9	−9	−9	−9
(United States) Finau	−7	−7	−7	−7	−7	−7	−8	−8	−8	−8	−7	−8	−7	−7	−7	−7	−7	−7
(England) Westwood	−7	−8	−9	−9	−10	−10	−10	−10	−9	−10	−9	−8	−7	−7	−7	−6	−6	−6
(United States) Koepka	−8	−7	−6	−5	−7	−7	−7	−7	−7	−7	−6	−6	−6	−6	−7	−7	−6	−6
(Scotland) MacIntyre	−2	−3	−3	−3	−3	−3	−4	−4	−4	−5	−5	−5	−5	−4	−4	−4	−4	−5
(England) Hatton	−3	−4	−4	−5	−5	−5	−4	−4	−4	−4	−4	−5	−5	−4	−4	−4	−5	−5
(England) Willett	−7	−8	−8	−8	−8	−8	−9	−9	−8	−8	−7	−8	−7	−6	−5	−5	−5	−5
(United States) Fowler	−6	−7	−8	−9	−9	−9	−9	−9	−9	−7	−7	−7	−6	−5	−6	−6	−5	−5
(United States) Reed	−4	−4	−5	−5	−4	−4	−5	−5	−4	−4	−4	−5	−5	−5	−5	−5	−4	−4
(United States) Holmes	−8	−8	−8	−7	−7	−6	−7	−6	−5	−5	−2	E	E	+1	+1	+2	+4	+6

Cumulative tournament scores, relative to par

Eagle	Birdie	Bogey	Double bogey	Triple bogey+

== Aftermath ==
=== Reaction from Lowry ===
Lowry was interviewed by host broadcaster, Sky Sports, where he discussed his victory:

"It's like an out-of-body experience! I was so calm coming down the last, I cannot believe it. The weather was awful but I had a look around, and everyone was struggling. It became a two-horse race with Tommy, and I just tried to focus on staying ahead."

"I suppose I talked to my caddie Bo a lot today, I said 'I cannot stop thinking about winning, holding the claret jug'. He just said, 'stay focused', and what a job he did today. I cannot wait to wake up tomorrow and feel what it feels like it is phenomenal."

=== Media and sporting reaction ===
Lowry's victory was widely covered in Ireland, and was featured on the front page of newspapers in both the Republic and Northern Ireland.

As Lowry advanced towards victory, the crowds gathered at Croke Park for the 2019 All-Ireland Senior Football Championship quarter-final double header received updates on the big screens in the stadium.

== Statistics ==
=== Course ===
Hardest three holes
Easiest three holes

Hole	1	2	3	4	5	6	7	8	9	Out	10	11	12	13	14	15	16	17	18	In	Total
Par	4	5	3	4	4	3	5	4	4	36	4	4	5	3	4	4	3	4	4	35	71
Yards	421	574	177	482	374	194	592	434	432	3,664	447	474	532	194	473	426	236	408	474	3,680	Total
Average score to par
1st round	+0.21	−0.37	+0.02	+0.24	−0.10	+0.24	+0.12	+0.06	+0.22	+0.64	−0.03	+0.40	−0.22	−0.04	+0.16	+0.26	+0.24	+0.20	+0.37	+1.35	+1.99
2nd round	+0.15	−0.12	+0.04	+0.24	−0.09	−0.12	−0.35	+0.12	+0.12	−0.09	+0.04	+0.19	−0.48	−0.03	+0.53	−0.05	+0.19	−0.03	+0.19	+0.47	+0.39
3rd round	+0.08	−0.67	−0.10	+0.15	−0.04	+0.25	−0.07	−0.03	+0.00	−0.42	+0.00	+0.32	−0.48	+0.07	+0.33	+0.11	+0.25	−0.19	+0.10	+0.49	+0.07
4th round	+0.34	−0.32	−0.01	+0.10	−0.30	+0.03	−0.26	+0.32	+0.36	+0.25	+0.03	+0.62	−0.12	+0.16	+0.38	+0.12	+0.37	+0.29	+0.14	+1.99	+2.23
Tournament	+0.19	−0.32	−0.03	+0.20	−0.12	+0.09	−0.13	+0.11	+0.17	+0.10	−0.02	+0.35	−0.34	+0.01	+0.35	+0.11	+0.25	+0.07	+0.23	+1.08	+1.18

=== Player ===
The leading player in each category were:

Fairways hit
1st round	Park Sang-hyun	92.86%
2nd round	Adam Hadwin; Matt Kuchar; Xander Schauffele; Kevin Streelman	92.86%
3rd round	Paul Waring	92.86%
4th round	Lee Westwood	92.86%
Tournament	Brian Harman; Takumi Kanaya	82.14%

Greens in regulation
1st round	Shane Lowry	88.89%
2nd round	Yuki Inamori; Xander Schauffele	94.44%
3rd round	Shane Lowry	94.44%
4th round	Francesco Molinari	88.89%
Tournament	Shane Lowry	79.17%

Average number of putts
1st round	Ryan Palmer	1.33
2nd round	Jack Senior	1.28
3rd round	Danny Willett	1.39
4th round	Matt Fitzpatrick; Jim Furyk; Patrick Reed	1.39
Tournament	Zach Johnson; Jack Senior	1.44

Longest drives (yards)
1st round	Callum Shinkwin	381
2nd round	Luke List; Bubba Watson	351
3rd round	Alex Norén	335
4th round	Louis Oosthuizen	343
Tournament	Callum Shinkwin	381

== Driver conformity issues ==
Before the start of the championship, The R&A made random inspections of players' clubs and found four drivers out of 30 tested did not comply with the characteristic time (CT) test requirements, including that of Xander Schauffele. It was also reported that 15 drivers had failed similar testing in May 2019 at the Diamond Cup Golf event on the Japan Golf Tour.
