= Gus Faulkner =

English golfer (1893–1976)

Personal information
- Full name: Gustavus Kirkham Faulkner
- Nationality: England
- Born: 1893 Walton-on-the-Hill, Surrey, England
- Died: 6 August 1976 (aged 82) Chichester, West Sussex, England

Career
- Sport: Golf
- Status: Professional
- Professional wins: 1

Best results in major championships
- Masters Tournament: DNP
- PGA Championship: DNP
- U.S. Open: DNP
- The Open Championship: T12: 1931

Gustavus Kirkham Faulkner (1893 – 6 August 1976) was an English professional golfer, best known as the father of Max Faulkner, the winner of the 1951 Open Championship. He won the Welsh Professional Championship in 1922 and was tied for 12th in the 1931 Open Championship.

== Early life ==
Faulkner was born Walton-on-the-Hill, Surrey in 1893. He was brought up near Walton Heath Golf Club and was an assistant to James Braid before World War I. He competed in the qualifying stage of the 1914 Perrier Water Assistant Professionals' Tournament, an event whose final stages were later cancelled because of the war.

== Golf career ==
After World War I, Faulkner took a position at Pennard Golf Club on the Gower Peninsula in south Wales. Faulkner played regularly in domestic and national tournaments. He won the Welsh Professional Championship in 1922 at Rhos-on-Sea Golf Club. He had tied with James Horn on 292 for the 72 holes but won the 36-hole playoff the following day, scoring 148 to Horn's 151. He tied again in 1923, this time with Jack Milner, but this time lost the 36-hole playoff by a single stroke, having been 6 behind at lunch.

In 1926 Faulkner took a position at a golf facility in Regent's Park but the following year took a position at Bramley Golf Club where he remained until 1945. After leaving Bramley, Faulkner was briefly at West Bay, Dorset and Worlebury Golf Club, Weston-super-Mare. In 1948, together with his son, Max, they bought Selsey Golf Club in Sussex. The purpose of this was to provide Max with practice facilities to help him win the Open Championship. They remained the owners until selling the lease in 1957.

== Personal life ==
Faulkner married Ellen Eliza Hussey in 1915. They had three children, Max (1916–2005), who won the 1951 Open Championship, Reginald (born 1918) and Frank (1919–1941). Frank was an assistant professional to his father at Bramley before World War II but was killed in a road traffic accident near Cambridge, while serving as a corporal in the Army, aged 21.

== Death ==
Faulkner died in West Sussex on 6 August 1976 aged 82.

== Professional wins (1) ==
- 1922 Welsh Professional Championship

== Results in major championships ==
Tournament	1920	1921	1922	1923	1924	1925	1926	1927	1928	1929	1930	1931
The Open Championship	WD		T28				CUT		T33	CUT		T12

Note: Faulkner only played in The Open Championship.

Did not play

WD = withdrew
CUT = missed the half-way cut
"T" indicates a tie for a place
