= Addington Foursomes =

Golf tournament held in England

Tournament information
- Location: Addington, London, England
- Established: 1933
- Course: Addington Golf Club
- Month played: April
- Final year: 1939

Final champion
- Dai Rees and Alfred Critchley

Location in England

The Addington Foursomes was a golf tournament played in Addington Golf Club near Croydon, South London from 1933 to 1939. Each pair consisted of a professional and amateur. The first tournament was held from 31 October to 2 November 1933 but thereafter the event was held in April.

== Winners ==
Year	Winners	Country	Margin of victory	Runners-up	Ref
1933	Charles Whitcombe & Cameron Anderson	England; Scotland	5 & 4	(England) Fred Robson & (England) Cyril Gray	
1934	Abe Mitchell & Rex Hartley	England; England	5 & 3	(England) W E Peters & (England) W E Brownsell	
1935	Auguste Boyer & Francis Francis	France; England	2 & 1	(England) Abe Mitchell & (England) Rex Hartley	
1936	Bill Twine & J A Flaherty	England; Ireland	4 & 3	(England) Arthur Lacey & (England) Gerald Micklem	
1937	Max Faulkner & Stanley Anderson	England; England	2 & 1	(England) Bill Cox & (England) Cyril Gray	
1938	Bill Twine & J A Flaherty	England; Ireland	3 & 2	(England) Alf Perry & (Scotland) Andrew McNair	
1939	Dai Rees & Alfred Critchley	Wales; England	3 & 2	(England) Henry Cotton & (England) Max Aitken	
