= Slazenger Trophy =

Former men's golf tournament in the UK and Ireland

Tournament information
- Established: 1956
- Format: Team match play
- Final year: 1956

Final champion
- Great Britain and Ireland

The Slazenger Trophy was a men's professional team golf competition; one team representing Great Britain and Ireland, the other team representing the British Commonwealth and Empire. It was played just once, in 1956.

== Format ==
The cup was contested over two days with four 36-hole foursomes on the first day and eight 36-hole singles matches on the second day.

== History ==
The match was played on 20 and 21 July 1956 at Prince's Golf Club, Sandwich. The match was organised by the Golf Society of Great Britain. Most of the Commonwealth and Empire team had been in England to play in the Canada Cup at the end of June.

== Result ==
Year	Dates	Venue	Winners	Score	Ref
1956	20–21 July	Prince's Golf Club, Sandwich, England	Great Britain and Ireland	7–5	

== Appearances ==
The following are those who played in the match.

=== Great Britain and Ireland ===
- (Republic of Ireland) Harry Bradshaw
- (England) Bill Branch
- (England) Max Faulkner
- (England) Arthur Lees
- (England) Eric Lester
- (Republic of Ireland) Christy O'Connor Snr
- (Wales) Dai Rees
- (England) Syd Scott
- (England) Norman Sutton
- (England) Harry Weetman

=== Commonwealth and Empire ===
- (New Zealand) Frank Buckler
- (Australia) Bruce Crampton
- (South Africa) Bobby Locke
- (Australia) Frank Phillips
- (South Africa) Gary Player
- (New Zealand) Ernie Southerden
- (Australia) Peter Thomson
- (Australia) Norman Von Nida
- (South Africa) Trevor Wilkes

The Australian Bill Shankland was in the Commonwealth and Empire team but did not play in any matches.
