= Bill Twine =

English golfer

Personal information
- Full name: William Thomas Twine
- Nationality: England
- Born: 16 January 1898 Hayling Island, Hampshire, England
- Died: 20 October 1977 (aged 79) Cambridge, England

Career
- Sport: Golf
- Status: Professional
- Professional wins: 4

Best results in major championships
- Masters Tournament: DNP
- PGA Championship: DNP
- U.S. Open: DNP
- The Open Championship: 11th: 1934

William Thomas Twine (16 January 1898 – 20 October 1977) was an English professional golfer. He was a regular competitor in the Open Championship and had a best finish of 11th in 1934. He never won an important individual tournament, his best finish being in the 1932 Dunlop-Southport Tournament where he tied with Henry Cotton but lost the 36-hole playoff by a single shot.

== Tournament wins ==
- 1925 Kent Professional Championship
- 1931 Kent Professional Championship
- 1936 Addington Foursomes (with J A Flaherty)
- 1938 Addington Foursomes (with J A Flaherty)

== Results in major championships ==
Tournament	1922	1923	1924	1925	1926	1927	1928	1929	1930	1931	1932	1933	1934	1935	1936	1937	1938
The Open Championship	T53		T36	47		T30	T14	T36	T44	T26	T25	T37	11	CUT	CUT		CUT

Note: Twine only played in The Open Championship.

Did not play

CUT = missed the half-way cut
"T" indicates a tie for a place

== Team appearances ==
- Seniors vs Juniors (representing the Juniors): 1928
- England–Ireland Professional Match (representing England): 1932 (winners)
