= Shane Lowry =

Irish professional golfer (born 1987)

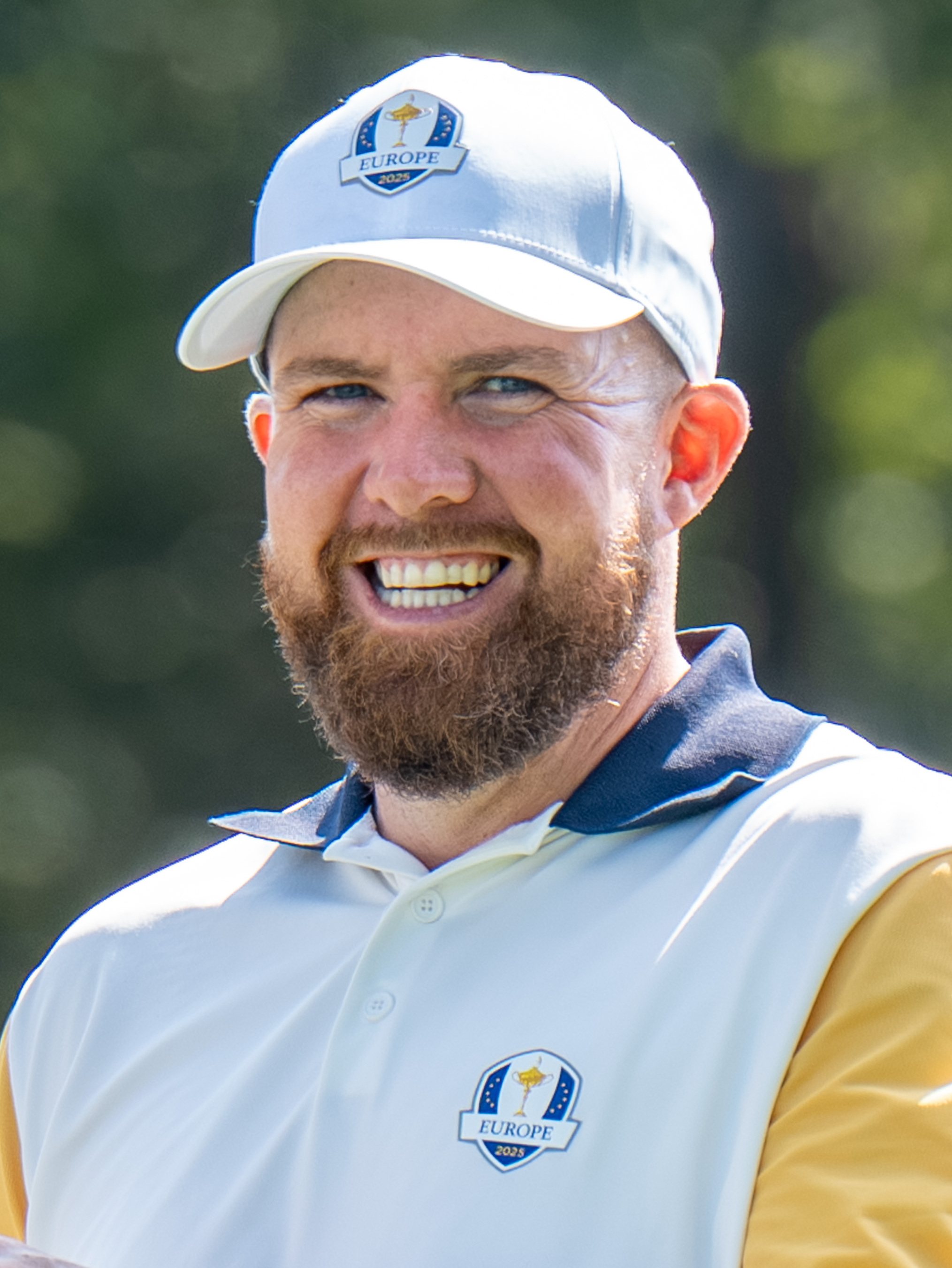
- Lowry at the 2025 Ryder Cup

Personal information
- Nationality: Ireland
- Born: 2 April 1987 (age 39) Mullingar, Ireland
- Height: 6 ft 1 in (185 cm)
- Weight: 225 lb (102 kg)
- Spouse: Wendy Honner (m. 2016)
- Children: 2

Career
- Sport: Golf
- College: Athlone Institute of Technology
- Turned professional: 2009
- Current tours: European Tour; PGA Tour
- Professional wins: 8
- Highest ranking: 10 (11 May 2025) (as of 15 November 2026)

Number of wins by tour
- PGA Tour: 3
- European Tour: 7

Best results in major championships (wins: 1)
- Masters Tournament: T3: 2022
- PGA Championship: T4: 2021
- U.S. Open: T2: 2016
- The Open Championship: Won: 2019

Shane Lowry (born 2 April 1987) is an Irish professional golfer who plays on the European Tour and the PGA Tour. He has won one major championship, the 2019 Open Championship.

Lowry won the Irish Open in 2009 as an amateur. He turned professional and accepted European Tour membership afterwards. Lowry earned PGA Tour status by winning the 2015 WGC-Bridgestone Invitational and began to play primarily in the United States. He claimed his first major title at the 2019 Open Championship. Lowry won the BMW PGA Championship, the European Tour's flagship event, in 2022. He added a second Irish Open title in 2026, with a record eleven-shot margin.

Lowry played for the Irish teams which won the European Amateur Team Championship in both 2007 and 2008. He has represented Europe at the Ryder Cup in 2021, 2023, and 2025; Lowry holed the decisive putt at the latter event.

== Early life ==
Born in the Midland Regional Hospital, Mullingar, County Westmeath, Ireland, Lowry grew up in Clara, County Offaly. He is the son of Brendan Lowry, who won the 1982 All-Ireland Senior Football Championship Final with Offaly. Shane Lowry maintained his links with Offaly as his golfing career advanced, saying in 2021: "But any time I get the chance to go to O'Connor Park and watch Offaly play, I do and I am the first to give out if they lose and I am sitting in the stand."

Lowry learned his early golf at Esker Hills Golf Club, where he began his amateur career. He attended Athlone Institute of Technology as a scholarship student on the Higher Certificate in Sport and Recreation.

== Amateur career ==
Lowry was the 2007 Irish Amateur Close Champion, defeating Niall Turner 4 and 3 in the final.

Lowry was part of the Irish teams that won the European Amateur Team Championship in 2007 and 2008, on the first occasion in the same team as Rory McIlroy.

While still an amateur in May 2009, he won the Irish Open at County Louth Golf Club on the European Tour, defeating Robert Rock on the third hole of a sudden death playoff. The win, on his tour debut, made him just the third amateur to win on the European Tour, following Danny Lee earlier in the 2009 season, and Pablo Martín in 2007. Lowry shot a 62 to equal the lowest ever by an amateur on the circuit and led from the second round onwards.

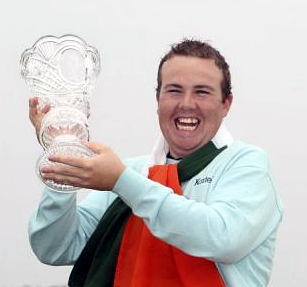
Lowry celebrating his win at the 2009 Irish Open at County Louth Golf Club

With this win, he entered the Official World Golf Ranking as an amateur at No. 168. His highest position in the World Amateur Golf Ranking was No. 3. Walker Cup captain Colin Dagleish described the win as "fairytale stuff", adding: "You'd have to say that Shane's victory was the biggest (of the three amateur wins). To win your own national Open is quite something. It was unbelievable, it really was." The win was only the second home victory since 1982 and the first since Pádraig Harrington in 2007. Harrington himself was also full of praise: "It's fabulous for Irish golf. You only have to look at the fact it is such a rarity for an amateur to win, such a rarity for an Irish player to win the Irish Open. So, on a lot of fronts, it is a big deal. It was very impressive."

== Professional career ==
=== European Tour ===
Lowry elected to turn professional the week after his Irish Open triumph, meaning that he would miss out on the opportunity to play in the Walker Cup in September 2009. He made his professional début on 28 May at the European Open, where he shot 78 in the first round to end the opening day almost at the back of the field, and went on to miss the cut following a second round 73.

Lowry missed the first three cuts of his professional career, but had his first payday on 5 July, when he finished 50th at the Open de France Alstom. He had his best professional result in 2009 in November, when he finished 3rd in the Dunlop Phoenix Tournament in Japan. In January 2010, Lowry finished in fourth place in the Abu Dhabi Golf Championship, moving him into the top-100 of the Official World Golf Ranking.

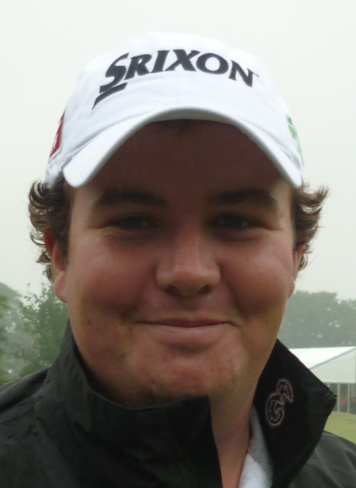
Lowry at the 2010 KLM Open

In June 2010, Lowry qualified for his first major championship, the Open Championship at St Andrews. During the qualification, Lowry equalled Nick Faldo's course record at Sunningdale when he posted a 62. Lowry went on to make the cut at St Andrews and eventually finished in a tie for 37th place.

Lowry won for the first time as a professional in 2012, at the Portugal Masters in October. He shot a 67 to tie for the lead with the Englishman Ross Fisher, who made bogey on the final hole after missing a four-foot putt. The victory lifted Lowry back into the Official World Golf Ranking top 100 and made him eligible to compete in the WGC-HSBC Champions.

In 2014, Lowry was runner-up at the BMW PGA Championship in May and later tied for ninth at the Open Championship at Royal Liverpool (Hoylake), his best finish at a major.

In August 2015, Lowry won the WGC-Bridgestone Invitational in the United States at Firestone in Akron, Ohio, two strokes ahead of runner-up Bubba Watson.

=== PGA Tour ===
Lowry accepted PGA Tour membership for the 2015–16 season.

At the 2016 U.S. Open at Oakmont Country Club near Pittsburgh, Lowry shot 65 (−5) in the third round for 203 (−7) and a four-stroke advantage over Dustin Johnson and Andrew Landry at the 54-hole stage. The 65 was Lowry's joint career best round at a major championship. Due to weather delays on Thursday, the third round was not completed until early on Sunday, and Lowry birdied two of his remaining four holes to extend his two stroke overnight lead to four. In the final round he was in contention for the title, within one shot of Dustin Johnson after 12 holes, before three consecutive bogeys on holes 14, 15 and 16 ended his chances. He finished the tournament tied for second place, with a final round score of 76.

Lowry did not win on the European Tour from 2016 to 2018 but was joint runner-up in the 2017 DP World Tour Championship, Dubai and runner-up in the 2018 Andalucía Valderrama Masters.

Lowry started the 2018–19 season with partial status after finishing 140th in the FedEx Cup.

In January 2019, Lowry won the Abu Dhabi HSBC Championship by one shot over Richard Sterne. He led by 3 strokes after three rounds but was two-over-par after 11 holes of his final round and dropped 4 shots behind Sterne. However he finished with 3 birdies in the final 7 holes, while Sterne had two bogeys, giving Lowry the victory.

In July, Lowry moved into a share of the 36-hole lead at the 2019 Open Championship at Royal Portrush, after successive opening rounds of 67. He was tied at eight under with J. B. Holmes. Lowry then shot a 63 for a new course record to lead by four strokes at the end of the third round. He won the tournament by six shots ahead of Tommy Fleetwood. Lowry held the Claret Jug for two years due to the COVID-19 pandemic postponing the 2020 edition of the Open Championship.

In September 2021, Lowry played on the European team in the 2021 Ryder Cup at Whistling Straits in Kohler, Wisconsin. The U.S. team won 19–9 and Lowry went 1–2–0 including a loss in his Sunday singles match against Patrick Cantlay.

In February 2022, Lowry finished runner-up at The Honda Classic. Sepp Straka birdied the final hole to finish one shot ahead of him. In April, Lowry held the lead during the final round of the RBC Heritage, however a double-bogey on the back nine, saw him finish one shot short of the playoff between Patrick Cantlay and Jordan Spieth. In September, Lowry won the BMW PGA Championship at the Wentworth Club. He shot a final-round 65 after the event had been shortened to 54 holes. He beat Rory McIlroy and Jon Rahm (who shot a 62 in the final round) by one stroke for his sixth European Tour victory.

In September 2023, Lowry played on the European team in the 2023 Ryder Cup at Marco Simone Golf and Country Club in Guidonia, Rome, Italy. The European team won 16.5–11.5 and Lowry went 1–1–1 including a half in his Sunday singles match against Jordan Spieth.

In the third round of the 2024 PGA Championship, Lowry shot a record-tying 62, only the fifth in men's major history.

In September 2025, Lowry was part of the European team in the 2025 Ryder Cup at Bethpage Black Course in Long Island, New York. The European team won 15–13. Lowry birdied a six-and-a-half footer at the 18th hole in his singles match against Russell Henley to win the half point that ensured that Europe would retain the trophy, which they went on to win.

Lowry held the lead at the Dubai Invitational in January 2026. On the final hole, he hit his third shot from a greenside bunker into the water. He made double bogey and finished two shots behind the winner Nacho Elvira. He said afterwards: "A disaster, that's what that was. ... It's not good enough. It's been a few years since I've won. It's hard to get over the line and I should have, but I didn't." In March, Lowry had a three-shot lead with three holes remaining at the Cognizant Classic. He made double bogey on both the 16th and 17th holes to finish runner-up, two strokes behind Nico Echavarria. Lowry said: "I had the tournament in my hands, and I threw it away. What more can I say? That's twice this year now so far. 'm getting good at it."

Lowry made a hole in one during the third round of the 2026 Masters Tournament, at the 190-yard (170 m), par-3 6th hole. He entered the final round in fourth place, two shots behind the co-leaders Rory McIlroy and Cameron Young. Lowry faded with a final-round 80 to finish tied-30th.

At the Amgen Irish Open in September 2026, Lowry shot 23-under 257 at Trump Doonbeg to win his national open for the second time. He finished eleven shots ahead of runners-up Joaquín Niemann and Patrick Reed and broke the tournament record for largest margin of victory, previously set by Bernhard Langer's ten-shot win in 1987.

== Personal life ==
Lowry married Wendy Honner in 2016 and has two daughters. He is Catholic.

During tournaments he often wears black and white clothes, which are the colours of his hometown's Gaelic sports club.

Lowry announced a five-year partnership with Offaly GAA in April 2021.

Lowry is a lifelong supporter of Manchester United.

== Amateur wins ==
- 2007 Irish Amateur Close Championship
- 2008 West of Ireland Championship, North of Ireland Championship, Mullingar Scratch Cup
- 2009 Lee Valley Senior Scratch Cup

== Professional wins (8) ==
=== PGA Tour wins (3) ===
Legend
Major championships (1)
World Golf Championships (1)
Other PGA Tour (1)

| No. | Date | Tournament | Winning score | To par | Margin of victory | Runner(s)-up |
|---|---|---|---|---|---|---|
| 1 | 9 Aug 2015 | WGC-Bridgestone Invitational | 70-66-67-66=269 | −11 | 2 strokes | (United States) Bubba Watson |
| 2 | 21 Jul 2019 | The Open Championship | 67-67-63-72=269 | −15 | 6 strokes | (England) Tommy Fleetwood |
| 3 | 28 Apr 2024 | Zurich Classic of New Orleans (with (Northern Ireland) Rory McIlroy) | 61-70-64-68=263 | −25 | Playoff | (United States) Chad Ramey and (France) Martin Trainer |

PGA Tour playoff record (1–0)

| No. | Year | Tournament | Opponents | Result |
|---|---|---|---|---|
| 1 | 2024 | Zurich Classic of New Orleans (with (Northern Ireland) Rory McIlroy) | (United States) Chad Ramey and (France) Martin Trainer | Won with par on first extra hole |

=== European Tour wins (7) ===
Legend
Major championships (1)
World Golf Championships (1)
Rolex Series (2)
Other European Tour (3)

| No. | Date | Tournament | Winning score | To par | Margin of victory | Runner(s)-up |
|---|---|---|---|---|---|---|
| 1 | 17 May 2009 | 3 Irish Open (as an amateur) | 67-62-71-71=271 | −17 | Playoff | (England) Robert Rock |
| 2 | 14 Oct 2012 | Portugal Masters | 67-70-67-66=270 | −14 | 1 stroke | (England) Ross Fisher |
| 3 | 9 Aug 2015 | WGC-Bridgestone Invitational | 70-66-67-66=269 | −11 | 2 strokes | (United States) Bubba Watson |
| 4 | 19 Jan 2019 | Abu Dhabi HSBC Championship | 62-70-67-71=270 | −18 | 1 stroke | (South Africa) Richard Sterne |
| 5 | 21 Jul 2019 | The Open Championship | 67-67-63-72=269 | −15 | 6 strokes | (England) Tommy Fleetwood |
| 6 | 11 Sep 2022 | BMW PGA Championship | 66-68-65=199 (Note: Shortened to 54 holes due to the death and state funeral of Elizabeth II.) | −17 | 1 stroke | (Northern Ireland) Rory McIlroy, (Spain) Jon Rahm |
| 7 | 13 Sep 2026 | Amgen Irish Open (2) | 67-62-65-63=257 | −23 | 11 strokes | (Chile) Joaquín Niemann, (United States) Patrick Reed |

European Tour playoff record (1–0)

| No. | Year | Tournament | Opponent | Result |
|---|---|---|---|---|
| 1 | 2009 | 3 Irish Open (as an amateur) | (England) Robert Rock | Won with par on third extra hole |

== Major championships ==
=== Wins (1) ===
| Year | Championship | 54 holes | Winning score | Margin | Runner-up |
|---|---|---|---|---|---|
| 2019 | The Open Championship | 4 shot lead | −15 (67-67-63-72=269) | 6 strokes | (England) Tommy Fleetwood |

=== Results timeline ===
Results not in chronological order in 2020.

| Tournament | 2010 | 2011 | 2012 | 2013 | 2014 | 2015 | 2016 | 2017 | 2018 |
|---|---|---|---|---|---|---|---|---|---|
| Masters Tournament | | | | | | CUT | T39 | CUT | |
| U.S. Open | | CUT | | | CUT | T9 | T2 | T46 | CUT |
| The Open Championship | T37 | | | T32 | T9 | CUT | CUT | CUT | CUT |
| PGA Championship | CUT | | | T57 | T46 | CUT | CUT | T48 | T12 |

| Tournament | 2019 | 2020 | 2021 | 2022 | 2023 | 2024 | 2025 | 2026 |
|---|---|---|---|---|---|---|---|---|
| Masters Tournament | CUT | T25 | T21 | T3 | T16 | T43 | T42 | T30 |
| PGA Championship | T8 | T66 | T4 | T23 | T12 | T6 | CUT | T44 |
| U.S. Open | T28 | T43 | T65 | CUT | T20 | T19 | CUT | CUT |
| The Open Championship | 1 | NT | T12 | T21 | CUT | 6 | T40 | T28 |

Top 10
Did not play

CUT = missed the half way cut
"T" = tied
NT = no tournament due to COVID-19 pandemic

=== Summary ===
| Tournament | Wins | 2nd | 3rd | Top-5 | Top-10 | Top-25 | Events | Cuts made |
|---|---|---|---|---|---|---|---|---|
| Masters Tournament | 0 | 0 | 1 | 1 | 1 | 4 | 11 | 8 |
| PGA Championship | 0 | 0 | 0 | 1 | 3 | 6 | 15 | 11 |
| U.S. Open | 0 | 1 | 0 | 1 | 2 | 4 | 14 | 8 |
| The Open Championship | 1 | 0 | 0 | 1 | 3 | 5 | 14 | 9 |
| Totals | 1 | 1 | 1 | 4 | 9 | 19 | 54 | 36 |

- Most consecutive cuts made – 12 (2019 PGA – 2022 PGA)
- Longest streak of top-10s – 1 (nine times)

== Results in The Players Championship ==
| Tournament | 2015 | 2016 | 2017 | 2018 | 2019 | 2020 | 2021 | 2022 | 2023 | 2024 | 2025 | 2026 |
|---|---|---|---|---|---|---|---|---|---|---|---|---|
| The Players Championship | CUT | T16 | CUT | T46 | CUT | C | 8 | T13 | T35 | T19 | T20 | CUT |

Top 10

CUT = missed the half-way cut
"T" indicates a tie for a place
C = cancelled after the first round due to the COVID-19 pandemic

== World Golf Championships ==
=== Wins (1) ===
| Year | Championship | 54 holes | Winning score | Margin | Runner-up |
|---|---|---|---|---|---|
| 2015 | WGC-Bridgestone Invitational | 2 shot deficit | −11 (70-66-67-66=269) | 2 strokes | (United States) Bubba Watson |

=== Results timeline ===
Results not in chronological order before 2015.

| Tournament | 2009 | 2010 | 2011 | 2012 | 2013 | 2014 | 2015 | 2016 | 2017 | 2018 | 2019 | 2020 | 2021 | 2022 | 2023 |
|---|---|---|---|---|---|---|---|---|---|---|---|---|---|---|---|
| Championship | | | | | | | T17 | T35 | | | T62 | T29 | T48 | | |
| Match Play | | | | | R16 | | T34 | T51 | T51 | | T24 | NT^{1} | T42 | T35 | T31 |
| Invitational | 77 | | | | T48 | | 1 | T36 | | | | T6 | T23 | | |
| Champions | T28 | | | 32 | | 34 | T68 | T23 | | | T43 | NT^{1} | NT^{1} | NT^{1} | |

^{1}Cancelled due to COVID-19 pandemic

Win
Top 10
Did not play

QF, R16, R32, R64 = Round in which player lost in match play
NT = No tournament
"T" = Tied
Note that the Championship and Invitational were discontinued from 2022. The Champions was discontinued from 2023.

== Team appearances ==
Amateur

- European Boys' Team Championship (representing Ireland): 2005
- European Youths' Team Championship (representing Ireland): 2006
- European Amateur Team Championship (representing Ireland): 2007 (winners), 2008 (winners)
- St Andrews Trophy (representing Great Britain & Ireland): 2008 (winners)
- Eisenhower Trophy (representing Ireland): 2008
- Bonallack Trophy (representing Europe): 2008 (winners)

Professional

- World Cup (representing Ireland): 2013, 2016, 2018
- EurAsia Cup (representing Europe): 2016 (winners)
- Ryder Cup (representing Europe): 2021, 2023 (winners), 2025 (winners)
- Hero Cup (representing Great Britain & Ireland): 2023

Ryder Cup points record
| 2021 | 2023 | 2025 | Total |
|---|---|---|---|
| 1 | 1.5 | 2 | 4.5 |
