= Royal Portrush Golf Club =

Golf club in Northern Ireland

- Location within Northern Ireland Location within island of Ireland Location within the United Kingdom
- 55.200°N 6.635°W

Club information
- Location: Portrush, County Antrim, Northern Ireland, UK
- Established: 1888 (138 years ago)
- Total holes: 36
- Tournaments: The Open Championship (1951, 2019, 2025); The Amateur Championship (1960, 1993, 2014); Boys Amateur Championship (2018); Irish Open (1930, 1937, 1947, 2012); The Senior Open Championship (1995, 1996, 1997, 1998, 1999, 2004); Ladies Irish Open (1979, 1980, 1981); Irish PGA Championship (1907, 1911, 1922, 1938, 1949)
- Website: www.royalportrushgolfclub.com

Dunluce Links
- Designed by: Harry Colt
- Par: 71
- Length: 7,337 yards (6,709 m)
- Course record: 63: Shane Lowry (new course record) (2019); 61: Rory McIlroy (old course record) (2005)

Valley Links
- Designed by: Harry Colt
- Par: 71
- Length: 6,346 yards (5,803 m)

Royal Portrush Golf Club is a private golf club in County Antrim, Northern Ireland. The 36-hole club has two links courses, the Dunluce Links (the championship course) and the Valley Links. The former is one of the courses on the rota of the Open Championship and it recently hosted the 2025 tournament.

In 1951, Royal Portrush first hosted the Open Championship, the oldest of golf's major championships; it was the first Open tournament not held on the island of Great Britain. The Open returned to Portrush in 2019, and recently held the 2025 Open. It also hosted the Irish Open in 2012, the first in Northern Ireland since 1953.

The Dunluce Links course is considered to be one of the best courses in the world. It was ranked fourth by Golf World in their list of "The 100 greatest courses in the British Isles" in November 1996. Golf Magazine ranked it sixteenth in their list of the Top 100 Courses in the World for 2023–2024. Golf Digest ranked it as the fourth best course outside the United States in 2007 and 2024.

== Location ==
Situated on the North Antrim Causeway Coast, Royal Portrush occupies a triangle of giant sand hills with views of the hills of Inishowen in County Donegal in the west, the Isle of Islay and Southern Hebrides in the north, with the Giant's Causeway and the Skerries in the east. The course is overlooked by the ruins of the 13th century Dunluce Castle, which gives its name to Dunluce course.

== History ==
The Royal Portrush Golf Club was founded 138 years ago in 1888 as The County Club. It became The Royal County Club in 1892 under the patronage of the Duke of York and assumed its present name in 1895 under the patronage of the Prince of Wales. In 1947, Rathmore Golf Club member Fred Daly became the first Irishman to win The Open Championship, and four years later the club hosted the championship itself, the first time the event was held in Northern Ireland. The club has also hosted the Senior British Open Championship between 1995 and 1999 and again in 2004. The club was also host to the 2010 Palmer Cup. Daly's feat was repeated by club member Darren Clarke in 2011. Clarke also named Royal Portrush his favourite golf course in the world.

The second course at Royal Portrush is the Valley Links, and is used mostly by members of the 'town' club Rathmore and the ladies and juniors of Royal Portrush. It is shorter and considered less demanding than the Dunluce Links. Rathmore clubhouse and the ladies clubhouse are situated adjacent to the first tee. A six-hole pitch and putt course, named Skerries, starts from the same location. There is also a driving range at the club.

== Rathmore Golf Club ==
The Valley Links is the home of Rathmore Golf Club, whose clubhouse is situated near the first tee. Famous members include 1947 Open Champion Fred Daly and 2010 U.S. Open champion Graeme McDowell.

== The Open Championship ==
The Open Championship was first staged at Royal Portrush in 1951; Max Faulkner won his sole major championship. The Open next returned to Portrush in July 2019. and again in July 2025.

A number of course changes were made in preparation for the 2019 Open. The 17th and 18th holes of the original Dunluce Links, the Championship course, were replaced by two new holes (the 7th and 8th) on land that was part of the Valley Links. Holes 7 to 16 were redesignated as holes 9 to 18 on the redesigned course. The land freed-up by removing the prior 17th and 18th holes was used for the tented village. There were number of other changes, including lengthening the 2nd hole by 40 yards (37 m) and realigning the 10th (the new 12th). Despite the newly designed Dunluce Links reducing the course from a par 72 to a par 71, the overall length increased by almost 200 yards (180 m) to 7,337 yards (6,709 m). The total number of bunkers also increased from 59 to 62. Since the Valley Links lost two holes to the Dunluce Links, a number of changes are also having to be made to that course.

Below are a list of Open Championship winners at Royal Portrush:

Year	Winner	Score				
Year	Winner	R1	R2	R3	R4	Total
1951	(England) Max Faulkner	71	70	70	74	285 (−3)
2019	(Republic of Ireland) Shane Lowry	67	67	63	72	269 (−15)
2025	(United States) Scottie Scheffler	68	64	67	68	267 (−17)

== Irish Open ==
The club's Dunluce course held the 2012 Irish Open, which was won by Jamie Donaldson. This was the first time that a European Tour event had been played in Northern Ireland and the first time since 1953 that the Irish Open had been played in Northern Ireland; it was last played at Royal Portrush in 1947.

== Scorecards ==
Dunluce Links – Championship tees

The Open Championship
Irish Open

Name	Pre 2016 layout				Post 2016 layout		
Name	Hole	Par	Yards		Hole	Par	Yards
Name	Hole	Par	1951	2012	Hole	Par	2019
Hughie's	1	4	400	416	1	4	421
Giant's Grave	2	5	510	528	2	5	574
Islay	3	3	160	174	3	3	177
Fred Daly's	4	4	455	479	4	4	482
White Rocks	5	4	398	411	5	4	374
Harry Colt's	6	3	200	189	6	3	194
Curran Point	n/a				7	5	592
Dunluce	n/a				8	4	434
P.G. Stevenson’s	7	4	426	431	9	4	432
Himalayas	8	4	380	433	10	4	447
Darren Clarke's	9	5	444	475	11	4	474
Dhu Varren	10	5	473	478	12	5	532
Feather Bed	11	3	167	191	13	3	194
Causeway	12	4	400	412	14	4	473
Skerries	13	4	380	418	15	4	426
Calamity Corner	14	3	208	210	16	3	236
Purgatory	15	4	367	391	17	4	408
Babington's	16	4	440	442	18	4	474
Glenarm	17	5	520	581	n/a		
Greenaway	18	4	476	484	n/a		
	Out	36	3,373	3,536	Out	36	3,664
	In	36	3,429	3,607	In	35	3,680
	Total	72	6,802	7,143	Total	71	7,344
	Ref:				Ref:		

Valley Links – Championship tees

Hole	Name	Yards	Par	Hole	Name	Yards	Par
1	Zara Bolton's	349	4	10	Middle Green	465	4
2	Green Lane	385	4	11	Right About	486	5
3	Fairy Ring	141	3	12	St. Andrews	421	4
4	War Hollow	534	5	13	Recess	165	3
5	Prospect	443	4	14	Giant's Elbow	391	4
6	Patrick's	409	4	15	Bunkers Hill	171	3
7	McDowell's	320	4	16	Valley	493	5
8	Switch Back	496	5	17	Saucer	194	3
9	Mann's	150	3	18	Home	333	4
Out		3,227	36	In		3,119	35
				Total		6,346	71

== Gallery ==
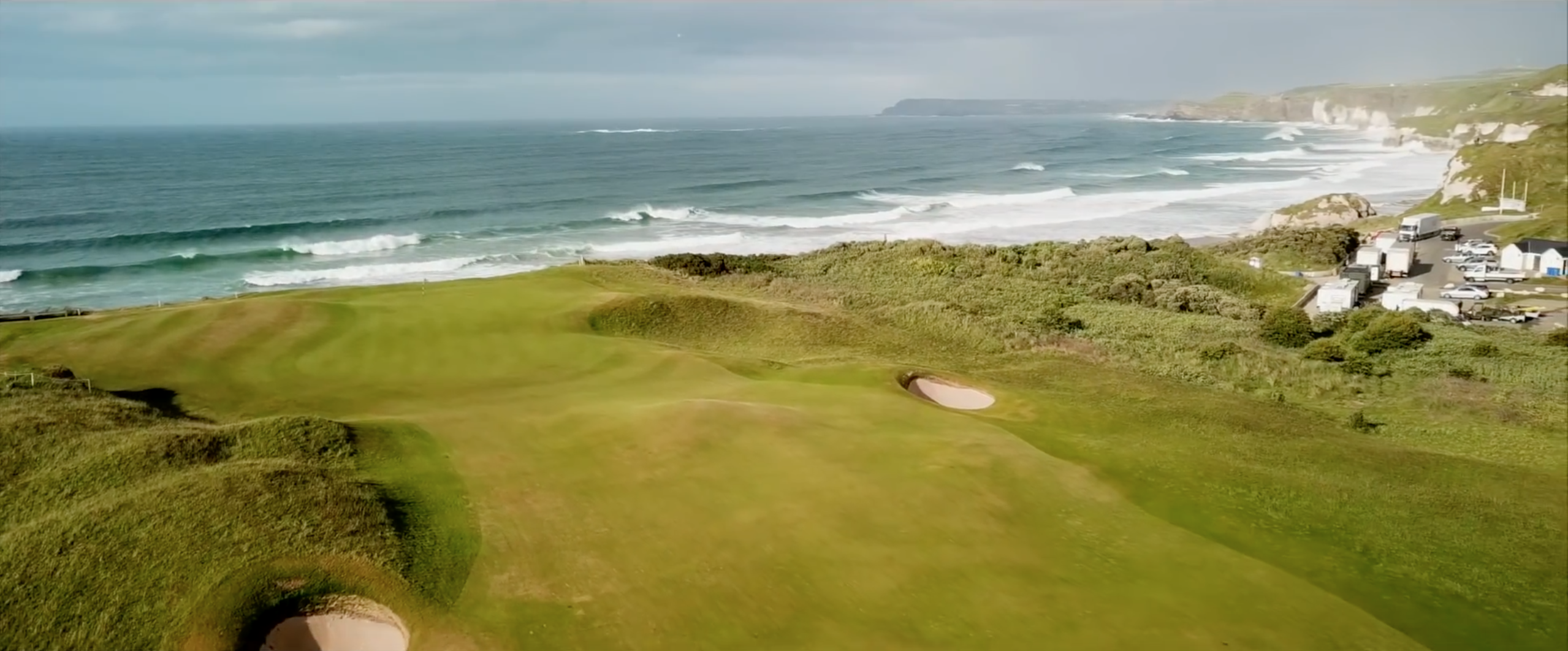
5th hole

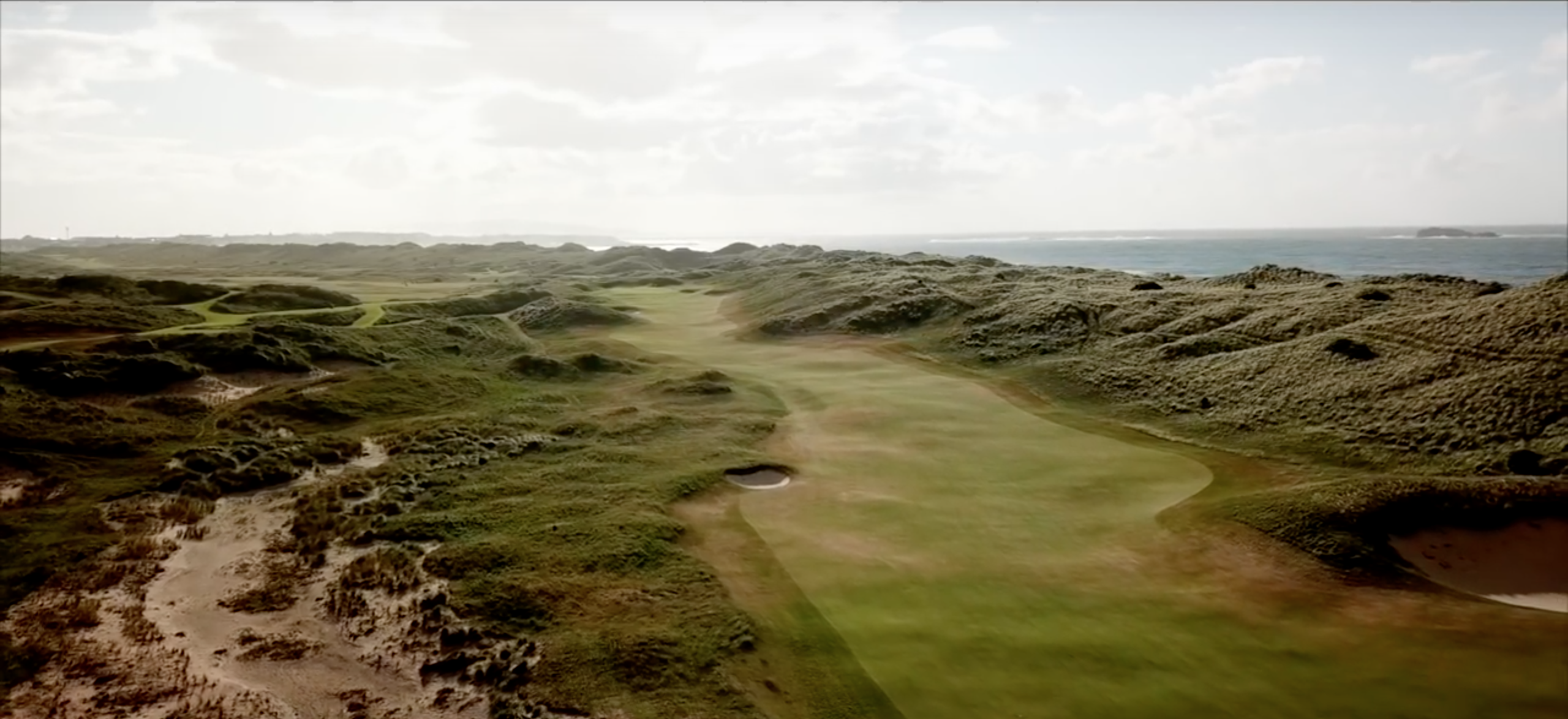
7th hole

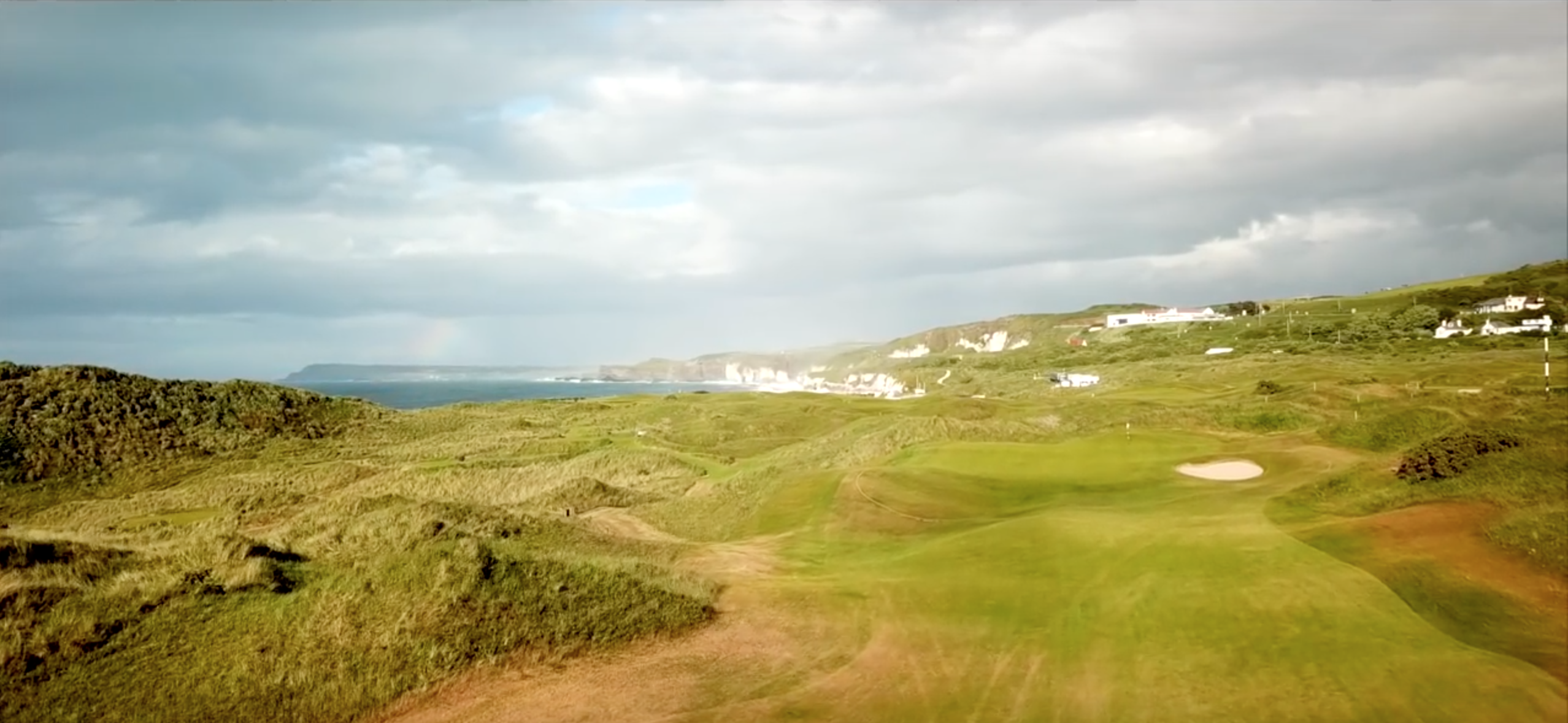
8th hole

== See also ==
- List of golf clubs granted Royal status
