= Norman Sutton =

English golfer (1908–1999)

Personal information
- Nationality: England
- Born: 11 January 1908 Birkenhead, Cheshire, England
- Died: 15 March 1999 (aged 91) Exeter, Devon, England

Career
- Sport: Golf
- Turned professional: 1929
- Professional wins: 7

Best results in major championships
- Masters Tournament: DNP
- PGA Championship: DNP
- U.S. Open: DNP
- The Open Championship: T6: 1951

Norman Sutton (11 January 1908 – 15 March 1999) was an English professional golfer. He tied for 6th place in the 1951 Open Championship and won the World Senior Championship in 1958.

== Golf career ==
Sutton was an amateur with the West Cheshire Artisans and played in the 1927 Amateur Championship at Hoylake, aged 19. He beat Harold Hilton in the first round, William Breck Torrance in the second round and Samuel Robinson in the third round. He lost in the fourth round, the last-32 stage, at the 19th hole to Captain Pearson, having been 2 up with 3 to play.

Sutton turned professional in early 1929, becoming an assistant at the Wentworth Club. He moved to Leigh Golf Club near Culcheth in 1932 where he stayed until moving to Exeter Golf and Country Club in 1952.

== Tournament wins ==
- 1946 Leeds Cup, Penfold Tournament
- 1950 Daks Tournament, Penfold Tournament (with Joan Gee)
- 1951 Leeds Cup
- 1958 PGA Seniors Championship, World Senior Championship

== Results in major championships ==
Tournament	1930	1931	1932	1933	1934	1935	1936	1937	1938	1939
The Open Championship	T24						T23	CUT	T32	CUT

Tournament	1940	1941	1942	1943	1944	1945	1946	1947	1948	1949
The Open Championship	NT	NT	NT	NT	NT	NT	34	17	T23	19

Tournament	1950	1951	1952	1953	1954	1955	1956	1957	1958	1959
The Open Championship	T24	T6	20	T29	T27	T27	CUT	T30	CUT	

Tournament	1960	1961	1962	1963	1964	1965	1966	1967
The Open Championship				CUT			CUT	CUT

Note: Sutton only played in The Open Championship.

Top 10
Did not play

NT = No tournament
CUT = missed the half-way cut
"T" indicates a tie for a place

== Team appearances ==
- Canada Cup (representing England): 1955
- Slazenger Trophy (representing Great Britain and Ireland): 1956 (winners)
- Amateurs–Professionals Match (representing the Professionals): 1956 (winners)
