= Ernie Southerden =

English-born New Zealand golfer

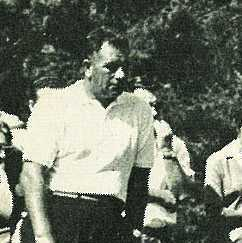

Personal information
- Full name: Ernest A Southerden
- Nationality: England; New Zealand
- Born: 1917 Rye, Sussex, England
- Died: 1996 (aged 79) New Zealand

Career
- Sport: Golf
- Status: Professional
- Professional wins: 3

Best results in major championships
- Masters Tournament: DNP
- PGA Championship: DNP
- U.S. Open: DNP
- The Open Championship: T20: 1949

Ernest A Southerden (1917–1996) was an English-born New Zealand professional golfer. He won the New Zealand PGA Championship three times and represented New Zealand seven times in the Canada Cup.

== Golf career ==
Southerden was born in Rye, Sussex, England in 1917 and learnt his golf at Rye Golf Club. His father died in 1930 and he left school soon afterwards and worked at Rye and later became the professional at Lamberhurst Golf Club, Lamberhurst, Kent. Southerden was unlucky in that he started playing tournaments just before the start of World War II. Lamberhurst was taken over by the army and Southerden was involved in the restoration of the course after the war. Southerden had limited success in professional tournaments. He qualified for the knock-out stages of the 1947 News of the World Matchplay but lost in the first round and qualified for the 1948 Open Championship but missed the cut. He qualified again the following year and was tied for 4th place after the first round, finishing tied for 20th place.

Southerden had married in 1947 and in 1950 they emigrated to New Zealand. He was the professional at Napier Golf Club from 1950 to 1993. He won the New Zealand PGA Championship in 1950, 1959 and 1961 and represented New Zealand seven times in the Canada Cup between 1954 and 1962. His son, Kim, is a professional golfer and also represented New Zealand, in the 1978 World Cup.

== Tournament wins (3) ==
- 1950 New Zealand PGA Championship
- 1959 New Zealand PGA Championship
- 1962 New Zealand PGA Championship

== Results in major championships ==
Tournament	1948	1949
The Open Championship	CUT	T20

Note: Southerden only played in the Open Championship.
CUT = missed the half-way cut
"T" = tied

== Team appearances ==
- Canada Cup (representing New Zealand): 1954, 1956, 1957, 1958, 1960, 1961, 1962
- Slazenger Trophy (representing British Commonwealth and Empire): 1956
