= Max Faulkner =

English professional golfer (1916–2005)

Max Faulkner OBE
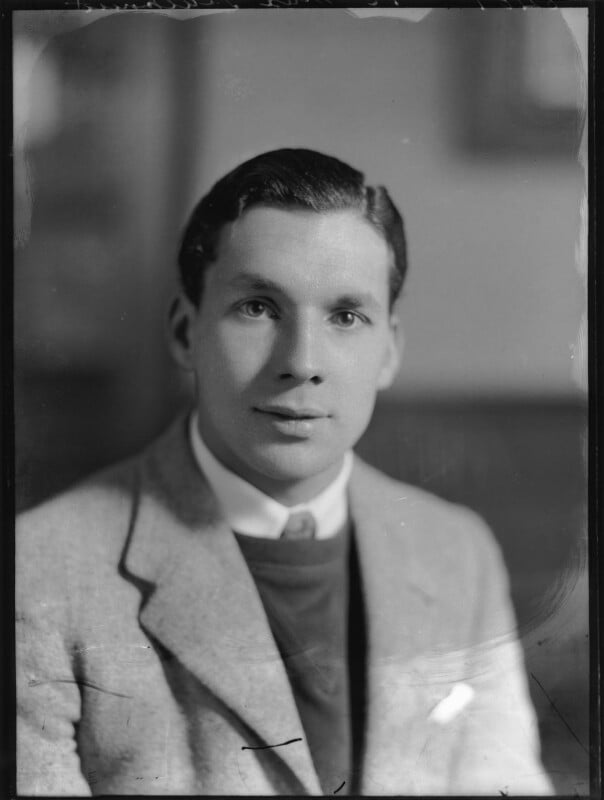
- Faulker in 1936

Personal information
- Full name: Herbert Gustavus Max Faulkner
- Nationality: England
- Born: 29 July 1916 Bexhill-on-Sea, England
- Died: 26 February 2005 (aged 88)
- Spouse: Joan

Career
- Sport: Golf
- Turned professional: 1930
- Professional wins: 19

Best results in major championships (wins: 1)
- Masters Tournament: DNP
- PGA Championship: DNP
- U.S. Open: DNP
- The Open Championship: Won: 1951

Achievements and awards
- Officer of the Order of the British Empire: 2001

Herbert Gustavus Max Faulkner, OBE (29 July 1916 – 26 February 2005) was an English professional golfer who won the Open Championship in 1951.

== Early life ==
Faulkner was born on 29 July 1916 in Bexhill-on-Sea, the son of Gus (1893–1976), a professional golfer who had been assistant to James Braid before World War I. After the war his father took a position at Pennard Golf Club on the Gower Peninsula in south Wales where he stayed until 1925. His father was briefly at a golf facility in Regent's Park but in 1927 became the professional at Bramley Golf Club, just south of Guildford, where he remained until 1945. Faulkner was outstanding at a number of sports but golf was his main interest. After leaving school he became an assistant to his father at Bramley in 1930.

Faulkner was the eldest of three boys. His younger brother, Frank (1919–1941), who was also an assistant to his father, was killed in a traffic accident near Cambridge, while serving as a corporal in the Army, aged 21.

== Professional career ==
Faulkner showed considerable golfing talent at a very young age. He entered the first Daily Mirror Assistants' Tournament in September 1933, just two months after his 17th birthday. The event had prize money of £750, more than the Open Championship, and attracted 206 entries. There was a 36-hole qualifying contest on the first day, after which the leading 64 played match-play. Faulkner finished the stroke-play in a tie for 16th place. The following day, despite suffering from a muscle problem in his back, he won his two matches, before losing the following day at the last-16 stage.

Faulkner played with his father in the 1934 Sunningdale Foursomes, where they lost in the semi-final. The second Daily Mirror Assistants' Tournament was played in late May 1934. Faulkner again qualified for the match-play stage but lost his first match. Still aged 17, he entered the 1934 Open Championship at Royal St George's. He had two rounds of 76 to qualify for the main event. In the championship he had two rounds of 78 and missed the cut. In September he qualified for the final stage of the News of the World Match Play, winning his first match and losing at the last-32 stage.

1935 was a less successful season for Faulkner. The Daily Mirror Assistants' Tournament became a stroke play event with sectional qualifying. Faulkner qualified well, finishing 4th in the strong Southern Section but missed the cut in the main tournament. 1936 started poorly, with Faulkner failing to qualify for the final stages of the Daily Mail Tournament. In April he moved from Bramley and took a position at Sonning Golf Club, east of Reading, Berkshire where Arthur Young was the professional. Faulkner was to be playing assistant and able to compete in all the leading tournaments.

Faulkner entered the 1936 Open Championship at Royal Liverpool Golf Club. He just qualified with a score of 155 for the two qualifying rounds. Four steady rounds left him tied for 21st place in the championship. At the end of July he had his best finish in an important tournament, the Daily Mirror Assistants' Tournament, despite starting with a 77. A final round course-record 66 lifted him into a tie for 3rd place. In September he qualified for the final stage of the News of the World Match Play where he won two matches before losing to Percy Alliss at the last-16 stage.

Faulkner was joint leader at the halfway stage of the 1937 Daily Mail Tournament but fell back with two rounds 78 on the final day. The following week, in partnership with Stanley Anderson, he won the Addington Foursomes. Faulkner was one of the leading qualifiers for the 1937 Open Championship at Carnoustie Golf Links, tying for 6th place. In the championship itself he had a second 83 and missed the cut. He again performed well in the Daily Mirror Assistants' Tournament, despite a poor first day. Final day rounds of 70 and 72 lifted him into 4th place. The following week he finished 3rd in the Irish Open.

In early 1938 Faulkner became the professional at Leamington Spa Golf Club. He had a less successful season but did finish tied for 4th in the Irish Open. Faulkner left his position at Leamington in early 1939 and played the rest of the season as an unattached professional. He qualified for the 1939 Open Championship and was joint-leader after the first round with 70, eventually finishing tied for 23rd place. He again performed well in the Irish Open finishing tied for 7th place.

=== War service ===
Faulkner had qualified for the final stage of the 1939 News of the World Match Play. The event was delayed until late April 1940 but Faulkner lost his first round match. Faulkner played relatively little golf during the war, although he played a number of exhibition matches in the winter of 1942/43.

During World War II Faulkner served in the RAF as a Physical Training (PT) instructor. He took up boxing, becoming services champion.

=== Post-war golf career ===
Faulkner's tournament career restarted immediately after the war. In September 1945 he was runner-up in the Daily Mail Tournament, a stroke behind Charlie Ward.

During his career he won 16 regular tournaments in Europe, including three Spanish Opens, with his last being the 1968 Portuguese Open at the age of 52. He also won the PGA Seniors Championship on two occasions. His greatest achievement was his victory in the 1951 Open Championship at Royal Portrush. With a round still to be played he had a 6-stroke lead and is reported to have signed autographs with the postscript "1951 Open Champion". Helped by what he called a "mystery guiding light", he went on to finish with a score of 3 under par, two ahead of Antonio Cerdá, and said later "It was all I ever wanted. The Open meant everything to me."

Faulkner played in five Ryder Cup matches, including the historic 1957 contest at Lindrick where the Great Britain team won for the first time since 1933.

Faulkner was believed to have over 300 putters, always searching for the perfect one. He very rarely used a conventional set of clubs, sometimes having several of the same club with a variety of shaft lengths and flexes. He was known for his shotmaking ability, being able to make the ball curve in the air even on short, lofted shots.

== Awards and honours ==
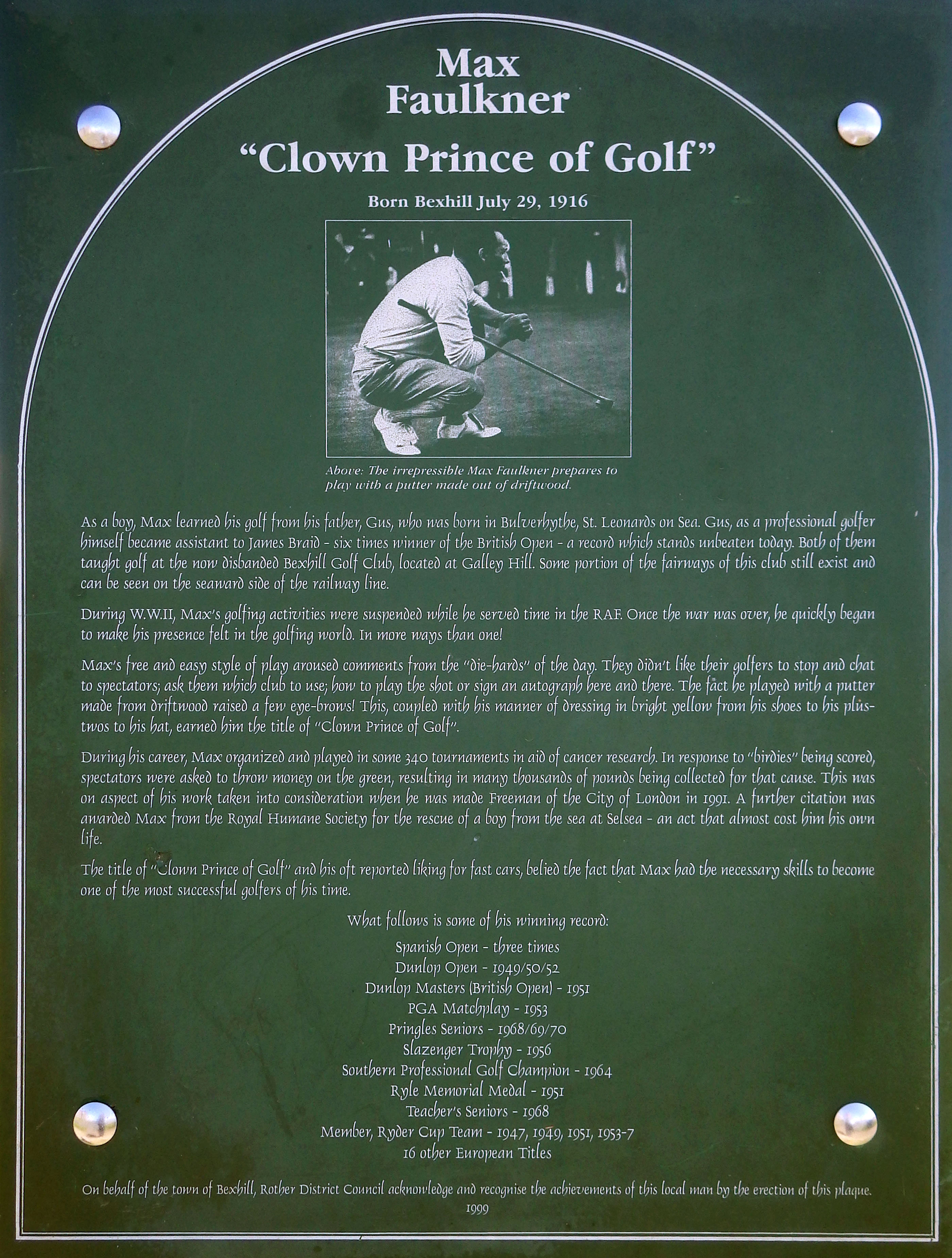
The Max Faulkner plaque, Bexhill-on-Sea

In 2001, on the 50th anniversary of the Open triumph, Faulkner was honoured with an Officer of the Order of the British Empire for services to golf.

== Personal life and death ==
Faulkner's daughter Hilary married professional golfer Brian Barnes, European Tour winner and Ryder Cup player, in 1968; they had two children, Didi and Guy. Hilary died in 2014 and Barnes died in 2019. Faulkner lived in his later years at Pulborough, Sussex. He died on 26 February 2005, aged 88, of pneumonia at St Richard's Hospital, Chichester.

== Professional wins (19) ==
=== British PGA circuit wins (9) ===
| No. | Date | Tournament | Winning score | Margin of victory | Runner(s)-up |
|---|---|---|---|---|---|
| 1 | 10 May 1946 | Dunlop-Southport Tournament | 79-74-72-71=296 | 1 stroke | (Australia) Norman Von Nida |
| 2 | 6 May 1949 | Dunlop Tournament | 74-67-72-74=287 | 2 strokes | (England) Sam King |
| 3 | 24 Jun 1949 | Penfold Tournament (with (England) John Burton) | 1 up (foursomes) | | (England) Dick Burton & (Belgium) Flory Van Donck |
| 4 | 2 Sep 1949 | Lotus Tournament | 69-68-70-70=277 | 1 stroke | (England) Charlie Ward |
| 5 | 6 Jul 1951 | The Open Championship | 71-70-70-74=285 | 2 strokes | (Argentina) Antonio Cerdá |
| 6 | 11 Oct 1951 | Dunlop Masters | 71-70-72-68=281 | 4 strokes | (England) Reg Horne |
| 7 | 2 May 1952 | Dunlop Tournament | 68-73-67-65-72=345 | 7 strokes | (Scotland) Tom Haliburton |
| 8 | 19 Sep 1953 | News of the World Match Play | 1 up | | (Wales) Dai Rees |
| 9 | 12 Jul 1959 | Irish Hospitals Tournament | 67-65-74-68=274 | 4 strokes | (England) Peter Alliss, (Wales) Dave Thomas |

=== Continental Europe wins (5) ===
| No. | Date | Tournament | Winning score | Margin of victory | Runner(s)-up |
|---|---|---|---|---|---|
| 1 | 19 Oct 1952 | Spanish Open | 275 | 2 strokes | (Scotland) Tom Haliburton |
| 2 | 18 Oct 1953 | Spanish Open | 271 | 6 strokes | (Spain) Carlos Sellés |
| 3 | 27 Oct 1957 | Spanish Open | 73-70-?-?=283 | 6 strokes | (England) Henry Cotton |
| 4 | 26 Aug 1962 | Woodlawn Tournament | 68-68-68-69=273 | Playoff | (New Zealand) Bob Charles |
| 5 | 24 Nov 1968 | Portuguese Open | 66-69-69-69=273 | 2 strokes | (Spain) Ángel Gallardo |

=== Other wins (3) ===
- 1937 Addington Foursomes (with Stanley Anderson)
- 1947 West of England Professional Championship
- 1964 Southern Professional Championship

=== Senior wins (2) ===
- 1968 PGA Seniors Championship
- 1970 PGA Seniors Championship

== Major championships ==
=== Wins (1) ===
| Year | Championship | 54 holes | Winning score | Margin | Runner-up |
|---|---|---|---|---|---|
| 1951 | The Open Championship | 6 shot lead | −3 (71-70-70-74=285) | 2 strokes | (Argentina) Antonio Cerdá |

=== Results timeline ===
| Tournament | 1934 | 1935 | 1936 | 1937 | 1938 | 1939 |
|---|---|---|---|---|---|---|
| The Open Championship | CUT | | T21 | CUT | | T23 |

| Tournament | 1940 | 1941 | 1942 | 1943 | 1944 | 1945 | 1946 | 1947 | 1948 | 1949 |
|---|---|---|---|---|---|---|---|---|---|---|
| The Open Championship | NT | NT | NT | NT | NT | NT | CUT | T32 | T15 | T6 |

| Tournament | 1950 | 1951 | 1952 | 1953 | 1954 | 1955 | 1956 | 1957 | 1958 | 1959 |
|---|---|---|---|---|---|---|---|---|---|---|
| The Open Championship | T5 | 1 | T17 | 12 | T20 | T35 | | T9 | T16 | CUT |

| Tournament | 1960 | 1961 | 1962 | 1963 | 1964 | 1965 | 1966 | 1967 | 1968 | 1969 |
|---|---|---|---|---|---|---|---|---|---|---|
| The Open Championship | | | CUT | T20 | T38 | T10 | CUT | CUT | CUT | T30 |

| Tournament | 1970 | 1971 | 1972 | 1973 | 1974 | 1975 |
|---|---|---|---|---|---|---|
| The Open Championship | CUT | CUT | CUT | CUT | CUT | CUT |

Note: Faulkner only played in The Open Championship.

Win
Top 10
Did not play

CUT = missed the half-way cut (3rd round cut in 1974 Open Championship)
"T" indicates a tie for a place

== Team appearances ==
- Ryder Cup (representing Great Britain): 1947, 1949, 1951, 1953, 1957 (winners)
- Slazenger Trophy (representing Great Britain and Ireland): 1956 (winners)
- Amateurs–Professionals Match (representing the Professionals): 1956 (winners), 1957 (winners)
- PGA Cup (representing Great Britain and Ireland): 1975
