= 1951 Open Championship =

Tournament information
- Dates: 4–6 July 1951
- Location: County Antrim, Northern Ireland; 55.200°N 6.635°W
- Course: Royal Portrush Golf Club

Statistics
- Par: 72
- Length: 6,802 yards (6,220 m)
- Field: 98 players, 46 after cut
- Cut: 154 (+10)
- Prize fund: £1,700 ($4,760)
- Winner's share: £300 ($840)

Champion
- (England) Max Faulkner
- 285 (−3)
- Location in the United Kingdom Location in Northern Ireland

The 1951 Open Championship was the 80th Open Championship, held 4–6 July at Royal Portrush Golf Club in County Antrim, Northern Ireland. Until 2019, it was the only time the championship was played outside England or Scotland. In it, Max Faulkner won his only major title, two strokes ahead of the runner-up, Antonio Cerdá, in the rain. Two-time defending champion Bobby Locke finished eight strokes back, in a tie for sixth.

The maximum number of players making the cut after 36 holes was increased from 40 to 50, and ties for 50th place did not make the cut. With potentially an extra 10 players making the cut and getting £20 prize money the total purse increased from £1,500 to £1,700. The other prizes remained unchanged, with £300 for the winner.

Only 148 players entered, the lowest since 1904. Qualifying took place on 2–3 July, Monday and Tuesday, with 18 holes on the Championship course at Portrush and 18 holes at Portstewart Golf Club. The number of qualifiers was limited to a maximum of 100, and ties for 100th place did not qualify. Cerdá led at 138 with Tom Haliburton, Bobby Locke, and Norman Von Nida a stroke behind. The qualifying score was 155 and 98 advanced. Peter Alliss qualified comfortably, following up a first round 76 at Portstewart with an impressive 69 at Portrush.

Jimmy Adams and Von Nida shared the lead after the first round on Wednesday with 68, the only sub-70 rounds in the championship. In the second round on Thursday, Faulkner shot 70 to take a two-stroke lead over Norman Sutton, with Fred Daly, and Harry Weetman a further shot behind. After his 69 in qualifying, Alliss scored 79 and 80 and missed the cut.

In the third round on Friday morning, Faulkner posted another 70 and stretched the 54-hole lead to six over Sutton and Cerdá. In the final round that afternoon, Faulkner finished 5-5-4-5 for 74 and 285. Cerdá was the only player still on the course with a chance to tie. Going out in 34, he reached the 16th needing to play the last three holes in twelve shots. His challenge ended when his drive ended up against some steps straddling a barbed wire fence and he took six. He finished on 287, two shots behind Faulkner.

Faulkner was the last Englishman to win the Open for 18 years, until Tony Jacklin in 1969. Frank Stranahan tied for twelfth and was the low amateur for the third straight year, one of two Americans to make the cut. Two Australians made their Open Championship debuts: future five-time champion Peter Thomson, age 21, finished in sixth place, while 1960 champion Kel Nagle was 19th.

The PGA Championship at Oakmont near Pittsburgh concluded on Tuesday, 3 July. This was the second day of the Open Championship qualification, making it impossible to play in the final two majors and resulted in very few Americans in the field. Sam Snead, the Open champion in 1946, won the final match at Oakmont for his third title in that championship.

== Round summaries ==
=== First round ===
Wednesday, 4 July 1951

| Place | Player | Score | To par |
|---|---|---|---|
| T1 | (Scotland) Jimmy Adams | 68 | −4 |
| T1 | (Australia) Norman Von Nida | 68 | −4 |
| T3 | (Wales) Dai Rees | 70 | −2 |
| T3 | (Australia) Peter Thomson | 70 | −2 |
| T5 | (England) Max Faulkner | 71 | −1 |
| T5 | (South Africa) Bobby Locke | 71 | −1 |
| 7 | (Belgium) Flory Van Donck | 72 | E |
| T8 | (Italy) Alfonso Angelini | 73 | +1 |
| T8 | (Australia) Eric Cremin | 73 | +1 |
| T8 | (Italy) Ugo Grappasonni | 73 | +1 |
| T8 | (England) Jack Hargreaves | 73 | +1 |
| T8 | (Scotland) John Panton | 73 | +1 |
| T8 | (Australia) Bill Shankland | 73 | +1 |
| T8 | (England) Norman Sutton | 73 | +1 |
| T8 | (England) Harry Weetman | 73 | +1 |

=== Second round ===
Thursday, 5 July 1951

| Place | Player | Score | To par |
|---|---|---|---|
| 1 | (England) Max Faulkner | 71-70=141 | −3 |
| 2 | (England) Norman Sutton | 73-70=143 | −1 |
| T3 | (Northern Ireland) Fred Daly | 74-70=144 | E |
| T3 | (England) Harry Weetman | 73-71=144 | E |
| T5 | (Scotland) Jimmy Adams | 68-77=145 | +1 |
| T5 | (South Africa) Bobby Locke | 71-74=145 | +1 |
| T5 | (Scotland) John Panton | 73-72=145 | +1 |
| T5 | (Australia) Peter Thomson | 70-75=145 | +1 |
| T5 | (Australia) Norman Von Nida | 68-77=145 | +1 |
| T10 | (Argentina) Antonio Cerdá | 74-72=146 | +2 |
| T10 | (Italy) Ugo Grappasonni | 73-73=146 | +2 |

=== Third round ===
Friday, 6 July 1951 (morning)

| Place | Player | Score | To par |
|---|---|---|---|
| 1 | (England) Max Faulkner | 71-70-70=211 | −5 |
| T2 | (Argentina) Antonio Cerdá | 74-72-71=217 | +1 |
| T2 | (England) Norman Sutton | 73-70-74=217 | +1 |
| 4 | (Australia) Peter Thomson | 70-75-73=218 | +2 |
| T5 | (Northern Ireland) Fred Daly | 74-70-75=219 | +4 |
| T5 | (South Africa) Bobby Locke | 71-74-74=219 | +4 |
| T5 | (Scotland) John Panton | 73-72-74=219 | +4 |
| T5 | (England) Harry Weetman | 73-71-75=219 | +4 |
| 9 | (Scotland) Jimmy Adams | 68-77-75=220 | +4 |
| 10 | (Australia) Bill Shankland | 73-76-72=221 | +5 |

=== Final round ===
Friday, 6 July 1951 (afternoon)

| Place | Player | Score | To par | Money (£) |
|---|---|---|---|---|
| 1 | (England) Max Faulkner | 71-70-70-74=285 | −3 | 300 |
| 2 | (Argentina) Antonio Cerdá | 74-72-71-70=287 | −1 | 200 |
| 3 | (England) Charlie Ward | 75-73-74-68=290 | +2 | 100 |
| T4 | (Scotland) Jimmy Adams | 68-77-75-72=292 | +4 | 62 ½ |
| T4 | (Northern Ireland) Fred Daly | 74-70-75-73=292 | +4 | 62 ½ |
| T6 | (South Africa) Bobby Locke | 71-74-74-74=293 | +5 | 20 |
| T6 | (Australia) Bill Shankland | 73-76-72-72=293 | +5 | 20 |
| T6 | (England) Norman Sutton | 73-70-74-76=293 | +5 | 20 |
| T6 | (Australia) Peter Thomson | 70-75-73-75=293 | +5 | 20 |
| T6 | (England) Harry Weetman | 73-71-75-74=293 | +5 | 20 |
