= Cyril Gray =

English cricketer

Cyril Douglas Gray (26 April 1895 – 20 February 1969) was an English first-class cricketer active 1925–27 who played for Middlesex and Surrey. He was born in Hampstead and died in Woking. He played in fifteen first-class matches as a right-handed batsman, scoring 563 runs with a highest score of 81 and held seven catches.

He was educated at Harrow School.
