= 2015 WGC-Bridgestone Invitational =

Golf tournament

Coordinates: 41.008°N 81.508°W

Tournament information
- Dates: August 6–9, 2015
- Location: Akron, Ohio, U.S.
- Course(s): Firestone Country Club; South Course
- Tour(s): PGA Tour; European Tour

Statistics
- Par: 70
- Length: 7,400 yards (6,767 m)
- Field: 77 players
- Cut: None
- Prize fund: $9,250,000 €8,323,589
- Winner's share: $1,570,000 €1,412,760

Champion
- (Republic of Ireland) Shane Lowry
- 269 (−11)

Location in the United States
Location in Ohio

The 2015 WGC-Bridgestone Invitational was a professional golf tournament held August 6–9 on the South Course of Firestone Country Club in Akron, Ohio. It was the 17th WGC-Bridgestone Invitational tournament, and the third of the World Golf Championships events in 2015. Shane Lowry shot a final-round 66 to win his first WGC event, two strokes ahead of runner-up Bubba Watson.

== Course layout ==
Hole	1	2	3	4	5	6	7	8	9	Out	10	11	12	13	14	15	16	17	18	In	Total
Yards	399	526	442	471	200	469	219	482	494	3702	410	418	180	471	467	221	667	400	464	3698	7400
Par	4	5	4	4	3	4	3	4	4	35	4	4	3	4	4	3	5	4	4	35	70

The South Course was designed by Bert Way and redesigned by Robert Trent Jones in 1960.

== Field ==
The field consisted of players drawn primarily from the Official World Golf Ranking and the winners of the world-wide tournaments with the strongest fields.

1. Playing members of the 2014 United States and European Ryder Cup teams.

Thomas Bjørn, Keegan Bradley (2,3), Jamie Donaldson (2,3), Victor Dubuisson (2,3), Rickie Fowler (2,3,4), Jim Furyk (2,3,4), Stephen Gallacher, Sergio García (2,3), Zach Johnson (2,3,4), Martin Kaymer (2,3), Matt Kuchar (2,3), Hunter Mahan (2,3,4), Graeme McDowell, Phil Mickelson (2,3), Ian Poulter (2,3), Patrick Reed (2,3,4), Justin Rose (2,3,4), Webb Simpson (2,3), Jordan Spieth (2,3,4), Henrik Stenson (2,3,4), Jimmy Walker (2,3,4), Bubba Watson (2,3,4), Lee Westwood (2,3,4,5)

- Rory McIlroy (2,3,4) withdrew due to an ankle injury.

2. The top 50 players from the Official World Golf Ranking as of July 27, 2015.

Paul Casey (3,4), Jason Day (3,4), Branden Grace (3,4,5), Bill Haas (3,4), Russell Henley, Charley Hoffman (3), J. B. Holmes (3,4), Billy Horschel (3,4), Thongchai Jaidee (3), Dustin Johnson (3,4), Kevin Kisner (3), Brooks Koepka (3,4), Anirban Lahiri (4), Marc Leishman (3), Shane Lowry (3), Hideki Matsuyama (3), Francesco Molinari (3), Ryan Moore (3,4), Kevin Na (3), Louis Oosthuizen (3), Ryan Palmer (3), Charl Schwartzel (3), Adam Scott (3), Brandt Snedeker (3,4), Brendon Todd (3), Bernd Wiesberger (3,4), Danny Willett (3,4), Gary Woodland (3)

- Chris Kirk (3,4) withdrew due to a hand injury.

3. The top 50 players from the Official World Golf Ranking as of August 3, 2015.

Marc Warren, Robert Streb (4)

4. Tournament winners, whose victories are considered official, of tournaments from the Federation Tours since the prior season's Bridgestone Invitational with an Official World Golf Ranking Strength of Field Rating of 115 points or more.

An Byeong-hun, Bae Sang-moon, Steven Bowditch, Andrew Dodt, Matt Every, Fabián Gómez, James Hahn, Pádraig Harrington, Mikko Ilonen, Søren Kjeldsen, Pablo Larrazábal, Danny Lee, David Lingmerth, David Lipsky, Joost Luiten, Ben Martin, Troy Merritt, Marcel Siem, Gary Stal, Camilo Villegas, Oliver Wilson

- Alex Norén withdrew due to a rib injury.

5. The winner of selected tournaments from each of the following tours:

- Asian Tour: Thailand Golf Championship (2014) – Lee Westwood, already qualified under categories 1, 2, 3, and 4
- PGA Tour of Australasia: BetEasy Masters (2014) – Nick Cullen
- Japan Golf Tour: Bridgestone Open (2014) – Koumei Oda
- Japan Golf Tour: Japan Golf Tour Championship – Liang Wenchong
- Sunshine Tour: Dimension Data Pro-Am – Branden Grace, already qualified under categories 2, 3, and 4

Notably missing from the field is former number 1 player Tiger Woods, who is outside the top 200 in the world rankings and whose last tournament win was his eighth title at the 2013 WGC-Bridgestone Invitational.

== Round summaries ==
=== First round ===
Thursday, August 6, 2015

Danny Lee shot a 5-under-par 65 to take the lead by one stroke over Jim Furyk and Graeme McDowell. The greens were firm and difficult and only 21 golfers in the field of 77 managed under-par rounds.

Place	Player	Score	To par
1	(New Zealand) Danny Lee	65	−5
T2	(United States) Jim Furyk	66	−4
T2	(Northern Ireland) Graeme McDowell	66	−4
T4	(United States) Rickie Fowler	67	−3
T4	(England) Justin Rose	67	−3
T6	(England) Paul Casey	68	−2
T6	(France) Victor Dubuisson	68	−2
T6	(Japan) Koumei Oda	68	−2
T6	(England) Ian Poulter	68	−2
T6	(United States) Webb Simpson	68	−2
T6	(Sweden) Henrik Stenson	68	−2
T6	(United States) Robert Streb	68	−2
T6	(England) Lee Westwood	68	−2

=== Second round ===
Friday, August 7, 2015

Place	Player	Score	To par
1	(United States) Jim Furyk	66-66=132	−8
T2	(United States) Dustin Johnson	69-67=136	−4
T2	(Republic of Ireland) Shane Lowry	70-66=136	−4
T2	(United States) Bubba Watson	70-66=136	−4
T5	(New Zealand) Danny Lee	65-72=137	−3
T5	(Northern Ireland) Graeme McDowell	66-71=137	−3
T5	(Sweden) Henrik Stenson	68-69=137	−3
T8	(Australia) Jason Day	69-69=138	−2
T8	(Spain) Sergio García	71-67=138	−2
T8	(United States) Brooks Koepka	69-69=138	−2
T8	(United States) Patrick Reed	71-67=138	−2
T8	(England) Justin Rose	67-71=138	−2
T8	(United States) Webb Simpson	68-70=138	−2
T8	(United States) Jordan Spieth	70-68=138	−2
T8	(United States) Robert Streb	68-70=138	−2
T8	(England) Lee Westwood	68-70=138	−2

=== Third round ===
Saturday, August 8, 2015

Place	Player	Score	To par
T1	(United States) Jim Furyk	66-66-69=201	−9
T1	(England) Justin Rose	67-71-63=201	−9
3	(Republic of Ireland) Shane Lowry	70-66-67=203	−7
T4	(Australia) Steven Bowditch	73-69-63=205	−5
T4	(England) Ian Poulter	68-72-65=205	−5
T4	(Sweden) Henrik Stenson	68-69-68=205	−5
T4	(United States) Bubba Watson	70-66-69=205	−5
T8	(United States) Brooks Koepka	69-69-68=206	−4
T8	(Northern Ireland) Graeme McDowell	66-71-69=206	−4
T8	(United States) Robert Streb	68-70-68=206	−4

=== Final round ===
Sunday, August 9, 2015

Shane Lowry's 66 (−4) overtook third round co-leaders Justin Rose and Jim Furyk, who each carded 72 (+2). Runner-up Bubba Watson also shot 66 and finished two strokes behind Lowry.

Place	Player	Score	To par	Money ($)
1	(Republic of Ireland) Shane Lowry	70-66-67-66=269	−11	1,570,000
2	(United States) Bubba Watson	70-66-69-66=271	−9	930,000
T3	(United States) Jim Furyk	66-66-69-72=273	−7	470,000
T3	(England) Justin Rose	67-71-63-72=273	−7	470,000
5	(United States) Robert Streb	68-70-68-68=274	−6	330,000
T6	(United States) Brooks Koepka	69-69-68-69=275	−5	219,000
T6	(New Zealand) Danny Lee	65-72-70-68=275	−5	219,000
T6	(Sweden) David Lingmerth	70-71-66-68=275	−5	219,000
T6	(Sweden) Henrik Stenson	68-69-68-70=275	−5	219,000
T10	(United States) Rickie Fowler	67-72-70-67=276	−4	149,500
T10	(United States) Jordan Spieth	70-68-72-66=276	−4	149,500

==== Scorecard ====
Final round

Hole	1	2	3	4	5	6	7	8	9	10	11	12	13	14	15	16	17	18
Par	4	5	4	4	3	4	3	4	4	4	4	3	4	4	3	5	4	4
(Republic of Ireland) Lowry	−7	−8	−8	−8	−8	−8	−8	−9	−9	−10	−10	−10	−10	−10	−10	−10	−10	−11
(United States) Watson	−5	−6	−5	−5	−5	−5	−5	−6	−7	−8	−8	−8	−9	−9	−8	−8	−9	−9
(England) Rose	−9	−9	−9	−8	−8	−8	−7	−7	−8	−7	−7	−7	−7	−7	−7	−8	−8	−7
(United States) Furyk	−9	−10	−10	−10	−9	−9	−9	−8	−8	−8	−9	−8	−8	−8	−8	−8	−8	−7
(United States) Streb	−3	−4	−5	−4	−4	−4	−4	−4	−3	−3	−3	−3	−4	−4	−5	−6	−6	−6

Cumulative tournament scores, relative to par

Birdie	Bogey
