= 2009 Senior Open Championship =

Tournament information
- Dates: 23–26 July 2009
- Location: Sunningdale, England, United Kingdom; 51.38°N 0.63°W
- Courses: Sunningdale Golf Club, Old Course
- Organised by: The R&A
- Tours: European Senior Tour; Champions Tour
- Format: 72 holes stroke play

Statistics
- Par: 70
- Length: 6,613 yards (6,047 m)
- Field: 144 players, 78 after cut
- Cut: 144 (+4)
- Prize fund: US$2,000,000
- Winner's share: US$315,600

Champion
- (United States) Loren Roberts
- 268 (−12)

Location map
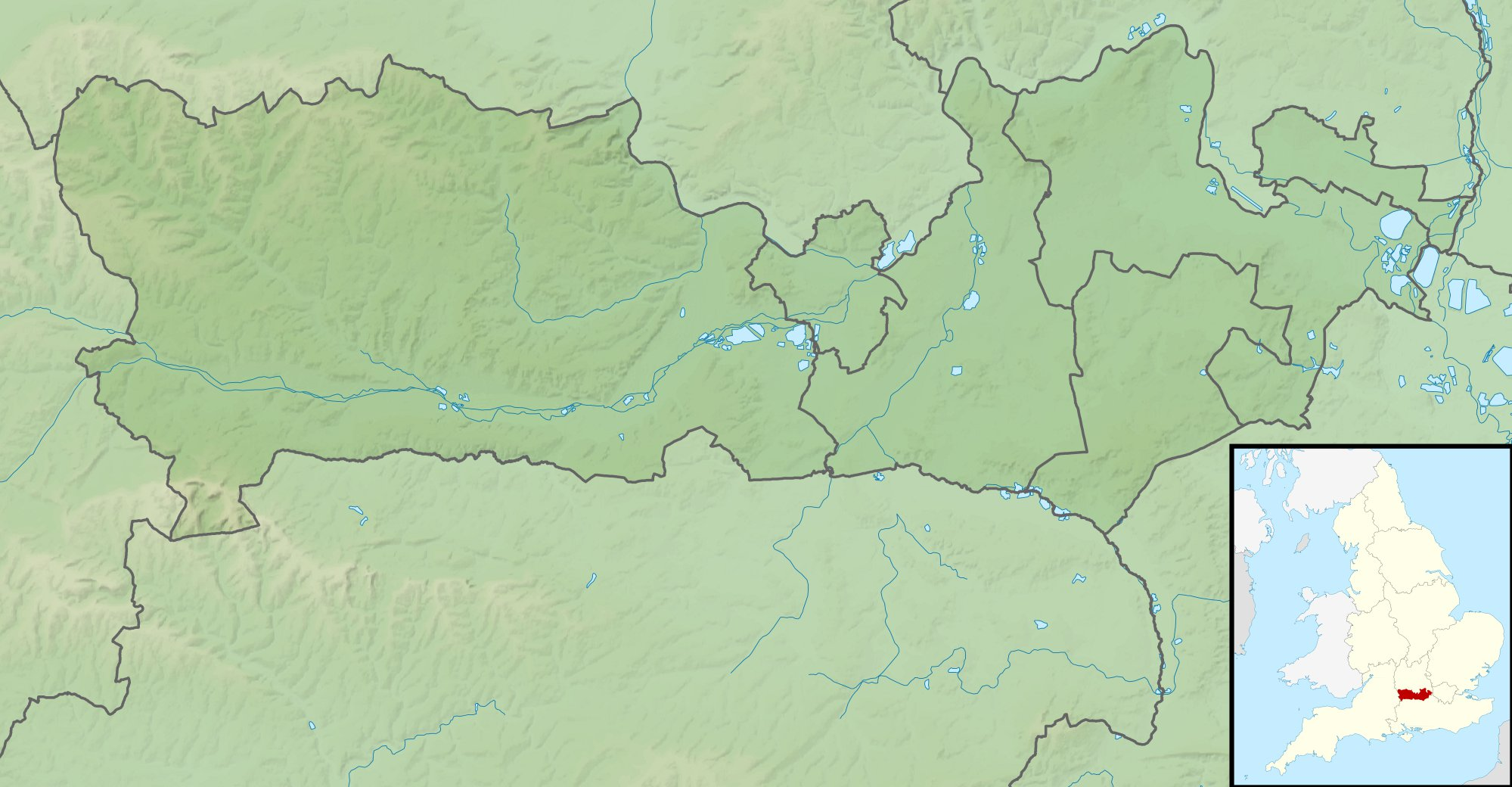
- Location in the United Kingdom Location in England Location in Berkshire

The 2009 Senior Open Championship was a senior major golf championship and the 23rd Senior Open Championship, held on 23–26 July at Sunningdale Golf Club in Sunningdale, England. It was the first Senior Open Championship played at the course and the seventh Senior Open Championship played as a senior major championship.

Loren Roberts won after a playoff over Fred Funk and Mark McNulty. It was Roberts' fourth senior major championship victory.

== Venue ==
The event was the first Senior Open Championship played at Sunningdale Golf Club. It took place at the club's Old Course, which was designed by The Open Championship winner Willie Park Jr. and opened in 1901.

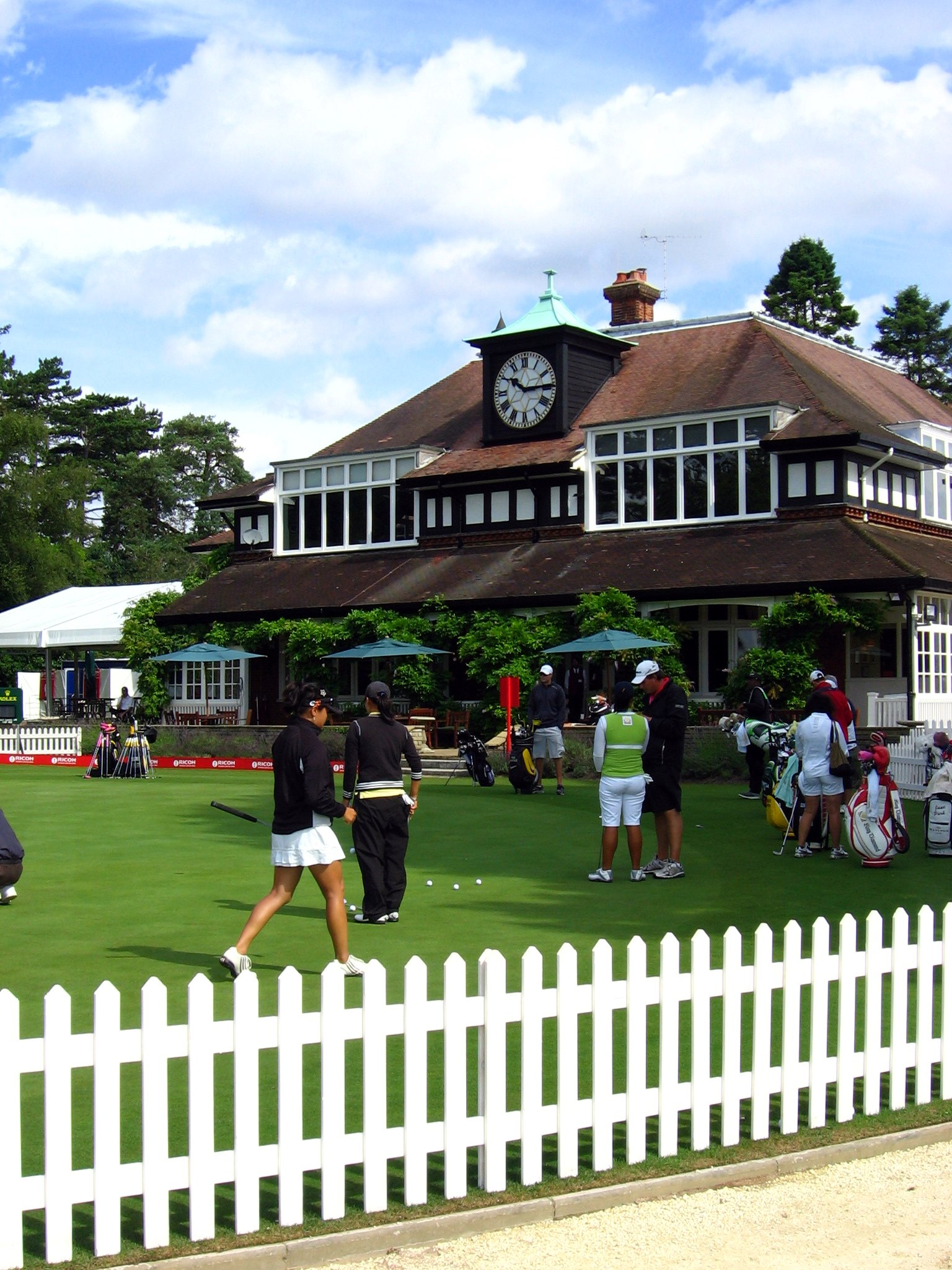
Sunningdale GC clubhouse

=== Course layout ===
Hole	Yards	Par	Hole	Yards	Par
1	492	5	10	475	4
2	489	4	11	322	4
3	318	4	12	442	4
4	156	3	13	185	3
5	419	4	14	503	5
6	433	4	15	227	3
7	406	4	16	434	4
8	192	3	17	424	4
9	273	4	18	423	4
Out	3,178	35	In	3,435	35
Source:		Total		6,613	70

== Field ==
The field of 144 competitors included139 professionals and five amateurs.

18-hole stroke play qualifying rounds were held on Monday, 21 July, on three places in England, Berkshire Golf Club, Camberley Heath and Mill Ride Golf Club, for players who were not already exempt. The 28 leading players from the qualifying competitions joined the 116 exempt players for the championship.

The 77 players who made the 36-hole cut included 76 professionals and one amateur. Paul Simson finished leading amateur at tied 58th.

=== Past champions in the field ===
Seven past Senior Open champions participated. Three of them made the 36-hole cut; 2006 champion Loren Roberts (won), 2003, 2005 and 2007 champion Tom Watson (tied 8th) and 2008 champion Bruce Vaughan (tied 8th). 1989 and 1993 champion Bob Charles, 2004 champion Pete Oakley, 1999 and 2000 champion Christy O'Connor Jnr and 1988, 1990 and 1997 champion Gary Player did not make the cut. The event marked the last appearance in the Senior Open for 73-year-old Player.

=== Past winners and runners-up at The Open Championship in the field ===
The field included eight former winners of The Open Championship. Six of them made the cut; 1986 and 1993 Open champion Greg Norman (tied 6th), 1975, 1977, 1980, 1982 and 1983 Open champion Tom Watson (tied 8th), 1985 Open champion Sandy Lyle (tied 13th), 1998 Open champion Mark O'Meara (tied 25h), 1987, 1990 and 1992 Open champion Nick Faldo (tied 38th) and 1996 Open champion Tom Lehman (tied 58th). 1963 Open champion Bob Charles and 1959, 1968 and 1974 Open champion Gary Player did not make the cut.

The field also included eleven former runners-up at The Open Championship; Mark McNulty (tied 2nd), Bernhard Langer (4th), Tom Kite (tied 8th), Gordon J. Brand (tied 28th), Andy Bean (tied 32nd), Wayne Grady (tied 32nd), Ben Crenshaw (43rd), Costantino Rocca (tied 50th), John Cook (missed cut), Simon Owen (missed cut) and Mike Harwood (missed cut).

== Final round and playoff summaries ==
=== Final round ===
Sunday, 26 July 2009

Fred Funk, Mark McNulty and Loren Roberts tied the lead after the fourth round, to meet in a sudden death playoff, to decide the winner. Curt Byrum's three eagles in the final round made him just the fifth player in Champions Tour history to record three eagles in a round.

Place	Player	Score	To par	Money ($)
T1	(United States) Fred Funk	64-65-72-67=268	−12	Playoff
T1	(Republic of Ireland) Mark McNulty	69-67-68-64=268	−12	Playoff
T1	(United States) Loren Roberts	66-68-67-67=268	−12	Playoff
4	(Germany) Bernhard Langer	72-67-65-65=269	−11	94,700
5	(Scotland) Sam Torrance	67-65-71-67=270	−10	80,240
T6	(United States) Larry Mize	69-70-64-68=271	−9	61,540
T6	(Australia) Greg Norman	67-69-64-71=271	−9	61,540
T8	(United States) Tom Kite	67-68-69-69=273	−7	38,972
T8	(United States) Don Pooley	70-66-69-68=273	−7	38,972
T8	(United States) Bruce Vaughan	70-69-65-69=273	−7	38,972
T8	(Zimbabwe) Denis Watson	68-68-66-71=273	−7	38,972
T8	(United States) Tom Watson	67-69-70-67=273	−7	38,972

=== Playoff ===
Sunday, 26 July 2009

The sudden-death playoff, playing the 18th hole at Sunningdale until one of the players had a lower score on the hole than anyone of the others, was the first three-way playoff and the ninth playoff in Senior Open Championship history. Fred Funk was eliminated at the first extra hole where Loren Roberts and Mark McNulty had birdies. Roberts beat McNulty with a par at the third extra hole. Loren Roberts' victory, added to his playoff win over Eduardo Romero in the 2006 championship, made him the sixth player with multiple wins in the Senior Open championship. He also became the second player in Senior Open Championship history to win with four rounds in the 60s.

Place	Player	Score	To par	Money ($)
1	(United States) Loren Roberts	3-4-4=11	−1	315,600
T2	(United States) Fred Funk	4	E	164,500
T2	(Republic of Ireland) Mark McNulty	3-4-5=12	E	164,500

Preceded by 2009 Senior PGA Championship	Senior Major Championships	Succeeded by 2009 U.S. Senior Open
