= 2007 Senior Open Championship =

Tournament information
- Dates: 26–29 July 2007
- Location: Gullane, East Lothian, Scotland; 56.042°N 2.821°W
- Course: Muirfield
- Organised by: The R&A
- Tours: European Senior Tour; Champions Tour
- Format: 72 holes stroke play

Statistics
- Par: 71
- Length: 7,034 yd (6,432 m)
- Field: 144 players, 77 after cut
- Cut: 151 (+9)
- Prize fund: US$2,000,000 £1,250,000
- Winner's share: US$320,176

Champion
- (United States) Tom Watson
- 284 (E)
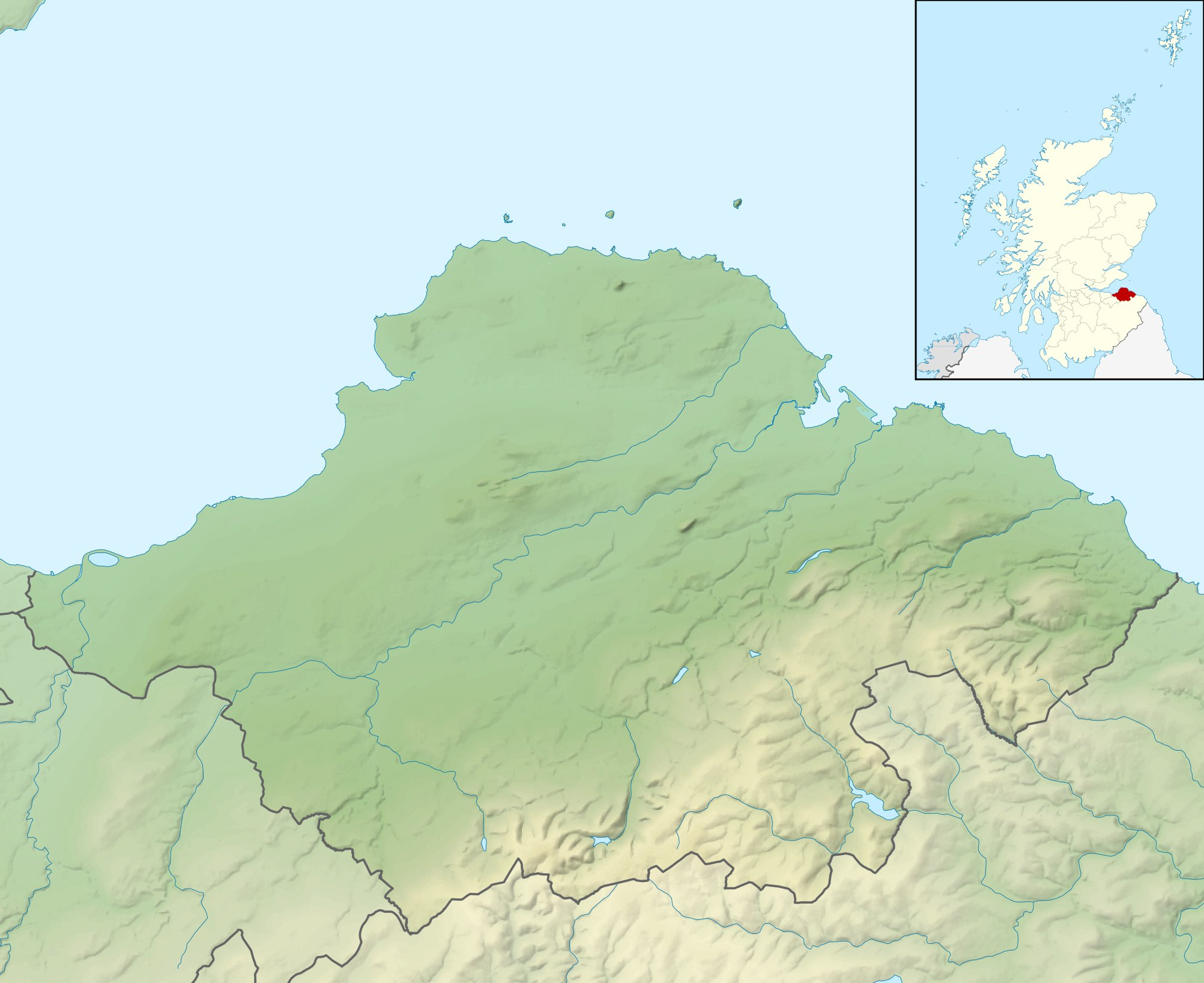
- Location in the United Kingdom Location in Scotland Location in East Lothian

The 2007 Senior Open Championship, for sponsorship reasons named The Senior Open Championship presented by Aberdeen Asset Management, was a senior major golf championship and the 21st Senior Open Championship, held from 26 to 29 July at Muirfield in Gullane, East Lothian, Scotland, United Kingdom. It was the first Senior Open Championship played at the course and the fifth Senior Open Championship played as a senior major championship.

Tom Watson won by one stroke over Stewart Ginn and Mark O'Meara to win his third Senior British Open title. The 2007 event was Watson's fifth senior major championship victory.

== Venue ==
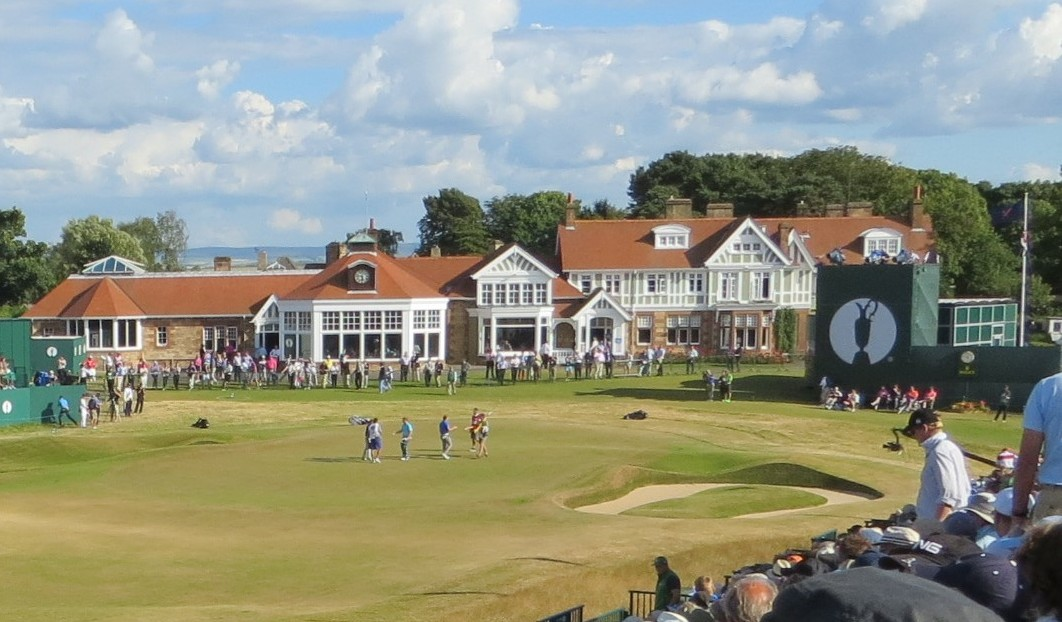
The clubhouse of The Honourable Company of Edinburgh Golfers

The club based at Muirfield, The Honourable Company of Edinburgh Golfers, was founded in 1744, being the oldest golf club in the world. The course, built in 1891 and designed by Old Tom Morris, had previously hosted The Open Championship 15 times, in 1980 won by Tom Watson.

Hole	1	2	3	4	5	6	7	8	9	Out	10	11	12	13	14	15	16	17	18	In	Total
Yards	448	351	378	213	560	468	185	443	509	3,555	475	389	381	191	448	414	186	546	449	3,479	7,034
Par	4	4	4	3	5	4	3	4	5	36	4	4	4	3	4	4	3	5	4	35	71

== Field ==
The field of 144 competitors comprised138 professionals and six amateurs.

18-hole stroke play qualifying rounds were held on Monday, 23 July, on three places in Scotland, Craigielaw Golf Club, Dunbar Golf Club and North Berwick Golf Club, for players who were not already exempt. 337 players entered the qualifying competitions and the leading 34 players joined the 110 exempt players for the championship.

77 players made the 36-hole cut, all of them professionals and no amateurs. One of them withdraw after the third round.

=== Past champions in the field ===
Seven past Senior Open champions participated. Five of them made the 36-hole cut; 2003 and 2005 champion Tom Watson (won), 2006 champion Loren Roberts (tied 4th), 1989 and 1993 champion Bob Charles (tied 34th), 2004 champion Pete Oakley (tied 48th) and 1988, 1990 and 1997 champion Gary Player (76th). 1987 champion Neil Coles and 2002 champion Noboru Sugai did not make the cut. The event marked the last appearance in the Senior Open for 72-year-old Coles, 20 years after winning the inaugural championship.

=== Past winners and runners-up at The Open Championship in the field ===
The field included six former winners of The Open Championship. Five of them made the cut; 1975, 1977, 1980, 1982 and 1983 Open champion Tom Watson (won) and 1998 Open champion Mark O'Meara (tied 2nd), 1987, 1990 and 1992 Open champion Nick Faldo (tied 14th),1963 Open champion Bob Charles (tied 34th) and 1959, 1968 and 1974 Open champion Gary Player (76th). 1969 Open champion Tony Jacklin did not make the cut.

The field also included eight former runners-up at The Open Championship; Gordon J. Brand (tied 10th), Tom Kite (tied 10th). Ben Crenshaw (tied 30th), Mark McNulty (tied 34th), Simon Owen (tied 38th), Costantino Rocca (tied 54th), Wayne Grady (missed cut) and Neil Coles (missed cut).

== Final results ==
Sunday, 29 July 2007

Place	Player	Score	To par	Money ($)
1	(United States) Tom Watson	70-71-70-73=284	E	320,176
T2	(Australia) Stewart Ginn	71-70-69-75=285	+1	166,885
T2	(United States) Mark O'Meara	72-71-70-72=285	+1	166,885
T4	(United States) Jay Haas	70-75-73-70=288	+4	75,585
T4	(United States) Lonnie Nielsen	69-74-74-71=288	+4	75,585
T4	(United States) Loren Roberts	74-72-71-71=288	+4	75,585
T4	(Argentina) Eduardo Romero	70-71-73-74=288	+4	75,585
8	(United States) John Ross	71-72-74-72=289	+5	47,986
9	(United States) Donnie Hammond	73-71-71-75=290	+6	43,055
T10	(England) Gordon J. Brand	68-73-74-76=291	+7	34,351
T10	(United States) Tom Kite	70-76-74-71=291	+7	34,351
T10	(Republic of Ireland) Des Smyth	70-70-77-74=291	+7	34,351
T10	(Scotland) Sam Torrance	69-75-71-76=291	+7	34,351

Preceded by 2007 U.S. Senior Open	Senior Major Championships	Succeeded by 2007 JELD-WEN Tradition
