= 2006 Senior Open Championship =

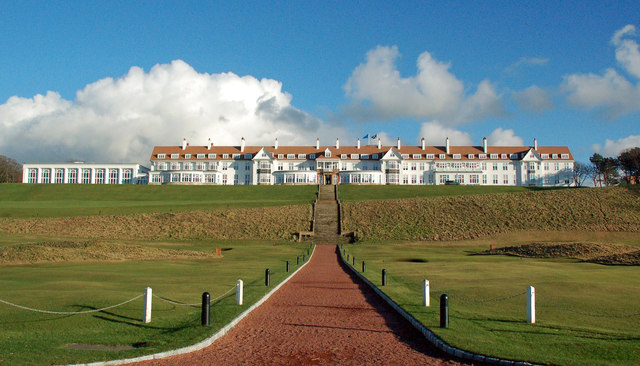
- Turnberry Golf Resort

Tournament information
- Dates: 27–30 July 2006
- Location: South Ayrshire, Scotland; 55.316°N 4.833°W
- Courses: Turnberry Golf Resort; Ailsa Course
- Organised by: The R&A
- Tours: European Seniors Tour; Champions Tour

Statistics
- Par: 70
- Length: 7,010 yards (6,410 m)
- Field: 144 players, 78 after cut
- Cut: 144 (+4)
- Prize fund: US$1,800,000
- Winner's share: US$293,981

Champion
- (United States) Loren Roberts
- 274 (−6)

Location map
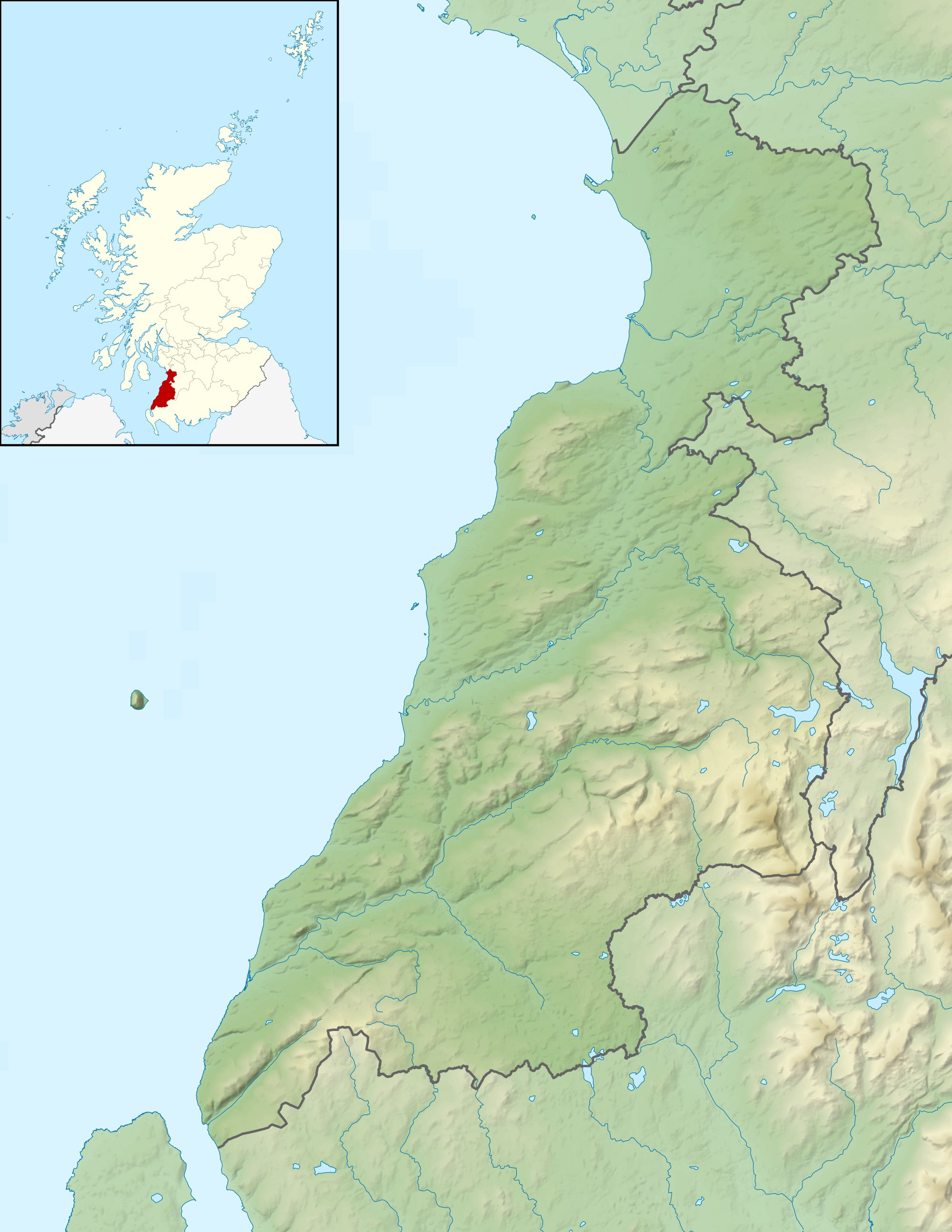
- Location in Europe Location in the British Isles Location in Scotland Location in South Ayrshire

The 2006 Senior Open Championship, also named the Senior British Open Championship or the Senior British Open Championship presented by Aberdeen Asset Management, was the 20th Senior Open Championship, a senior major golf championship. It was held on 27–30 July at Turnberry Golf Resort in South Ayrshire, Scotland, United Kingdom. It was the fourth Senior Open Championship played as a senior major championship.

Loren Roberts won the championship in a playoff over Eduardo Romero. It was Roberts' second senior major championship victory.

== Venue ==
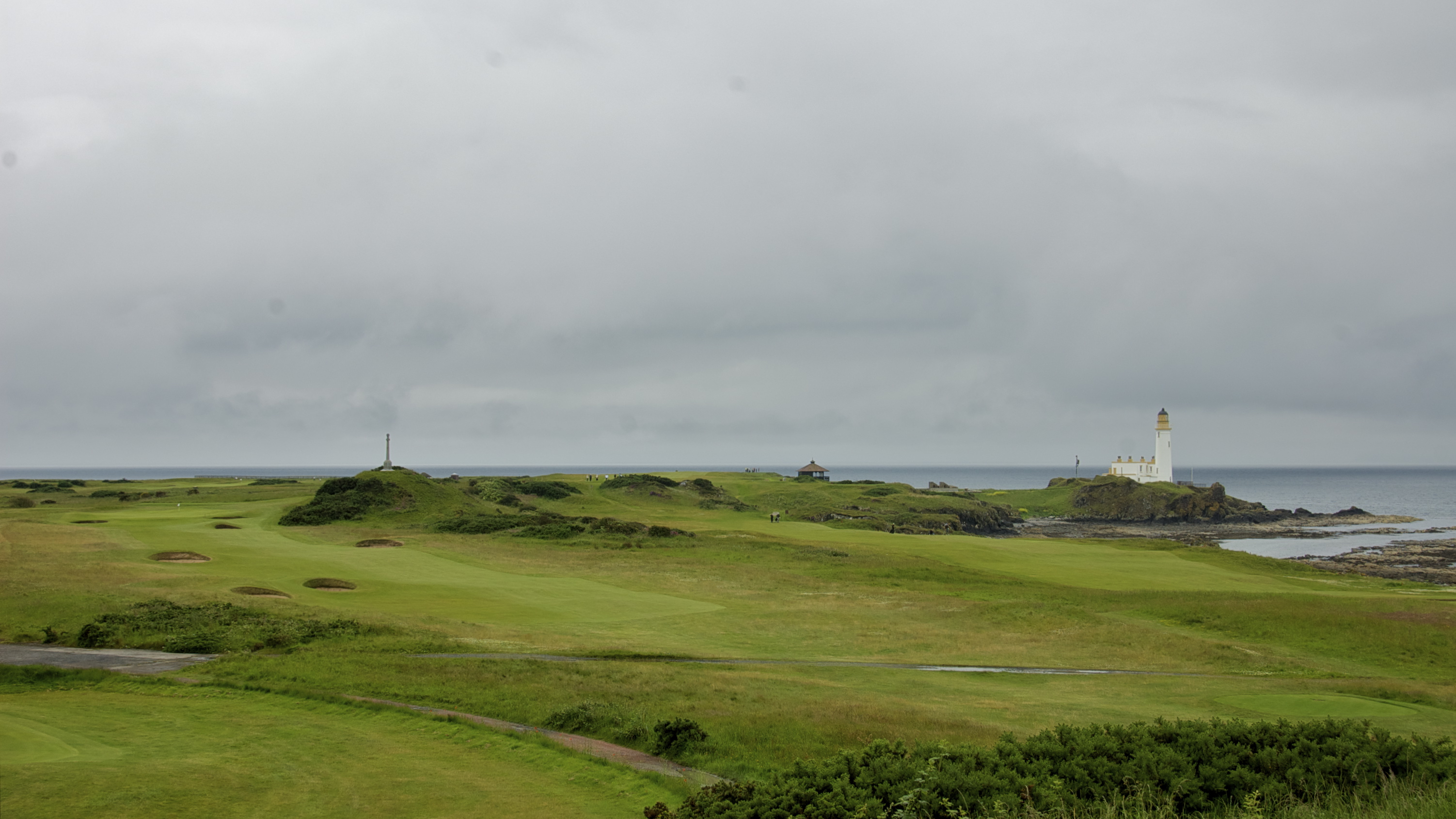
The 10th and 12th holes on the Ailsa course

The Ailsa Course at Turnberry, situated 80 kilometers south of Glasgow, Scotland, on headland along the Firth of Clyde, overlooking the Isle of Arran and Ailsa Craig, was initially opened with 13 holes in 1901, designed by Willie Fernie, and later completed to 18 holes. It was redesigned by Mackenzie Ross between 1949 and 1951.

The course has hosted the Senior Open Championship four times, including the 2006 tournament. It has also hosted The Open Championship three times; 1977, 1986 and 1994.

=== Card of the course ===
Ailsa Course

Hole	Name	Yards	Par	Hole	Name	Yards	Par
1	Ailsa Craig	358	4	10	Dinna Fouter	452	4
2	Mak Siccar	430	4	11	Maidens	174	3
3	Blaw Wearie	462	4	12	Monument	446	4
4	Woe-Be-Tide	165	3	13	Tickly Tap	412	4
5	Fin Me Oot	470	4	14	Risk-An-Hope	448	4
6	Tappie Toorie	231	3	15	Ca' Canny	209	3
7	Roon The Ben	529	5	16	Wee Burn	409	4
8	Goat Fell	431	4	17	Lang Whang	496	5
9	Bruce's Castle	454	4	18	Duel in the Sun	434	4
Out		3,530	35	In		3,480	35
Source:				Total		7,106	70

== Field ==
The field consisted of 144 competitors; 139 professionals and five amateurs.

18-hole stroke play qualifying rounds were held on Monday, 24 July, on three places in Scotland, Dundonald Links Golf Club, the Kintyre Course at Turnberry and The Irvine Golf Club, for players who were not already exempt. The 43 leading players from the qualifying competitions joined the 101 exempt players for the championship.

78 players made the 36-hole cut, all of them professionals and no amateurs.

=== Past champions in the field ===
Six past Senior Open champions participated. Two of them made the 36-hole cut; 2003 and 2005 champion Tom Watson (tied 23rd) and 1988, 1990 and 1997 champion Gary Player (tied 65th). 1989 and 1993 champion Bob Charles, 1987 champion Neil Coles, 2004 champion Pete Oakley and 2002 champion Noboru Sugai did not make the cut.

=== Past winners and runners-up at The Open Championship in the field ===
The field included three former winners of The Open Championship. Two of them made the cut; 1975, 1977, 1980, 1982 and 1983 Open champion Tom Watson (tied 23rd) and 1959, 1968 and 1974 Open champion Gary Player (tied 65th). 1963 Open champion Bob Charles did not make the cut.

The field also included seven former runners-up at The Open Championship; Gordon J. Brand (tied 10th), Tom Kite (tied 10th), Hale Irwin (tied 13th), Mark McMulty (tied 27th), Andy Bean (tied 35th), Simon Owen (tied 47th) and Neil Coles (missed cut).

== Final round and playoff summaries ==
=== Final round ===
Sunday, 30 July 2006

Loren Roberts and Eduardo Romero tied the lead after the fourth round, to meet in a sudden death playoff, to decide the winner. Roberts lost a four-shot lead after finishing with a five over par round of 75, including two double bogeys on the back nine holes.

Place	Player	Score	To par	Money ($)
T1	(United States) Loren Roberts	65-65-69-75=274	−6	Playoff
T1	(Argentina) Eduardo Romero	67-63-73-71=274	−6	Playoff
3	(United States) Dick Mast	71-67-70-67=275	−5	110,383
4	(United States) Craig Stadler	65-66-77-70=278	−2	88,213
5	(United States) Tim Simpson	66-67-72-74=279	−1	74,744
T6	(United States) Jay Haas	72-68-73-68=281	+1	57,325
T6	(United States) D. A. Weibring	72-70-71-68=281	+1	57,325
T8	(United States) David Edwards	67-65-76-75=283	+3	41,796
T8	(United States) Gil Morgan	68-65-75-75=283	+3	41,796
T10	(England) Gordon J. Brand	67-73-75-69=284	+4	32,640
T10	(United States) John Harris	73-68-72-71=284	+4	32,640
T10	(United States) Tom Kite	69-68-74-72=284	+4	32,640

=== Playoff ===
Sunday, 30 July 2006

The sudden-death playoff went on the 18th hole, to be played until one of the players had a lower score on the hole than the other. Loren Roberts beat Eduardo Romero with a par at the first extra hole. Roberts holed a 15 footer for par, while Romero three-putted from 40 feet for bogey.

Place	Player	Score	To par	Money ($)
1	(United States) Loren Roberts	4	E	293,981
2	(Argentina) Eduardo Romero	5	+1	196,081

Preceded by 2006 Ford Senior Players Championship	Senior Major Championships	Succeeded by 2006 JELD-WEN Tradition
