= 2005 Senior British Open Championship =

Tournament information
- Dates: 21–24 July 2005
- Location: Aberdeen, Scotland; 57.1782°N 2.0837°W
- Course: Royal Aberdeen Golf Club (Balgownie course)
- Organised by: The R&A
- Tours: European Senior Tour; Champions Tour
- Format: 72 hole stroke play

Statistics
- Par: 71
- Length: 6,834 yd (6,249 m)
- Field: 144 players, 79 after cut
- Cut: 157 (+15)
- Prize fund: US$1,800,000
- Winner's share: US$274,241

Champion
- (United States) Tom Watson
- 280 (-4)
- Location in Europe Location in the United Kingdom Location in Scotland

The 2005 Senior British Open Championship, for sponsor reasons named Senior British Open Championship presented by Aberdeen Asset Management, was a senior major golf championship and the 19th Senior Open Championship, held from 21 to 24 July at Royal Aberdeen Golf Club in Aberdeen, Scotland, United Kingdom. It was the third Senior British Open Championship played as a senior major championship.

Tom Watson won in a playoff for the title over Des Smyth to win his second Senior British Open title. The 2005 event was Watson's fourth senior major championship victory.

== Venue ==
The 2005 event was the first Senior Open Championship played at Royal Aberdeen Golf Club. It took place at the clubs Balgownie Course, opened in 1888 and originally designed by Archie Simpson and Robert Simpson but later re-bunkered and lengthened by James Braid.

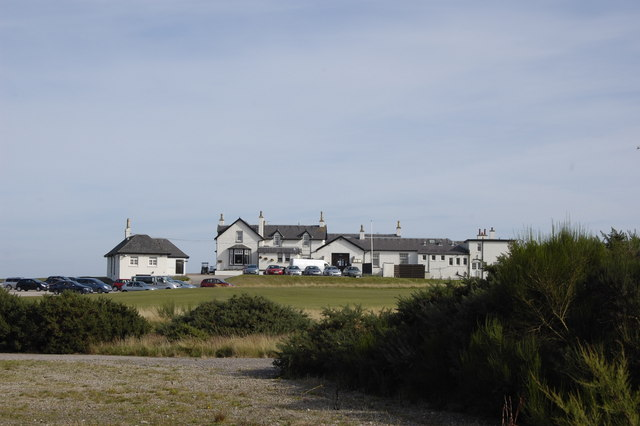
Royal Aberdeen GC clubhouse

=== Course layout ===
| Hole | Yards | Par | Hole | Yards | Par |
|---|---|---|---|---|---|
| 1 | 409 | 4 | 10 | 360 | 4 |
| 2 | 553 | 5 | 11 | 175 | 3 |
| 3 | 223 | 3 | 12 | 534 | 5 |
| 4 | 449 | 4 | 13 | 435 | 4 |
| 5 | 347 | 4 | 14 | 421 | 4 |
| 6 | 499 | 5 | 15 | 370 | 4 |
| 7 | 409 | 4 | 16 | 411 | 4 |
| 8 | 147 | 3 | 17 | 187 | 3 |
| 9 | 465 | 4 | 18 | 440 | 4 |
| Out | 3,501 | 36 | In | 3,333 | 35 |
| Source: | | Total | | 6,834 | 71 |

== Field ==
The field of 144 competitors consisted of 137 professionals and seven amateurs.

18-hole stroke play qualifying rounds were held on Monday, 18 July, on two places in Scotland, Murcar Golf Club and the Newmachar, for players who were not already exempt. The 26 leading players from the qualifying competitions joined the 118 exempt players for the championship.

79 players made the 36-hole cut, 76 professionals and two amateurs. Adrian Morrow finished leading amateur at tied 46th.

=== Past champions in the field ===
Eight past Senior Open champions participated. Four of them made the 36-hole cut; 2003 champion Tom Watson (won), 1989 and 1993 champion Bob Charles (tied 56th), 1988, 1990 and 1997 champion Gary Player (tied 61st) and 1999 and 2000 champion Christy O'Connor Jnr (tied 68th). 2001 champion Ian Stanley, 1987 champion Neil Coles, 2004 champion Pete Oakley and 1992 champion John Fourie did not make the cut.

=== Past winners and runners-up at The Open Championship in the field ===
The field included four former winners of The Open Championship. All of them made the cut; 1975, 1977, 1980, 1982 and 1983 Open champion Tom Watson (won), 1986 and 1993 Open champion Greg Norman (3rd), 1963 Open champion Bob Charles (tied 56th) and 1959, 1968 and 1974 Open champion Gary Player (tied 61st).

The field also included six former runners-up at The Open Championship; Mark McNulty (tied 8th), Andy Bean (tied 29th), Neil Coles (missed cut) Tom Kite (missed cut), Rodger Davis (missed cut) and Simon Owen (missed cut).

== Final round and playoff summaries ==
=== Final round ===
Sunday, 24 July 2005

Des Smyth and Tom Watson tied the lead after the fourth round, to meet in a sudden death playoff, to decide the winner. Watson held a one-shot lead going into the final round and finished with a 1-under par round 70, to tie with Smyth, who finished with a round of 67.

| Place | Player | Score | To par | Money ($) |
|---|---|---|---|---|
| T1 | (Republic of Ireland) Des Smyth | 73-72-68-67=280 | −4 | Playoff |
| T1 | (United States) Tom Watson | 75-71-64-70=280 | −4 | Playoff |
| 3 | (Australia) Greg Norman | 76-67-70-68=281 | −3 | 102,971 |
| 4 | (United States) Craig Stadler | 73-68-70-72=283 | −1 | 82,290 |
| 5 | (United States) Loren Roberts | 72-74-71-67=284 | E | 69,725 |
| T6 | (England) Derrick Cooper | 73-80-64-70=287 | +3 | 53,475 |
| T6 | (United States) David Eger | 80-70-72-65=287 | +3 | 53,475 |
| 8 | (Republic of Ireland) Mark McNulty | 76-72-72-68=288 | +4 | 41,101 |
| T9 | (Scotland) Martin Gray | 77-73-71-69=290 | +6 | 33,339 |
| T9 | (Argentina) Eduardo Romero | 75-71-75-69=290 | +6 | 33,339 |
| T9 | (Canada) Ray Stewart | 73-77-75-65=290 | +6 | 33,339 |

=== Playoff ===
Sunday, 24 July 2005

The sudden-death playoff went on the 18th hole, to be played twice, until one of the players had a lower score on the hole than the other. Tom Watson beat Des Smyth with a par at the third extra hole. They both made par on the 18th hole twice, with the playoff moving to the par-3 17th hole, where Watson made a par and Smyth a bogey. Smyth hit his tee shot into a greenside bunker and his second shot to within 20 feet of the hole, but missed the par putt, while Watson made a par to win the championship.

| Place | Player | Score | To par | Money ($) |
|---|---|---|---|---|
| 1 | (United States) Tom Watson | 4-4-3=11 | E | 274,241 |
| 2 | (Republic of Ireland) Des Smyth | 4-4-4=12 | +1 | 182,914 |

| Preceded by 2005 Ford Senior Players Championship | Senior Major Championships | Succeeded by 2005 U.S. Senior Open |
