= 2004 Senior British Open Championship =

Tournament information
- Dates: 22–25 July 2004
- Location: Portrush, County Antrim, Northern Ireland; 55.200°N 6.635°W
- Courses: Royal Portrush Golf Club; Dunluce Links
- Organised by: The R&A
- Tours: European Senior Tour; Champions Tour
- Format: 72 holes stroke play

Statistics
- Par: 72
- Length: 6,834 yd (6,249 m)
- Field: 144 players, 70 after cut
- Cut: 152 (+10)
- Prize fund: US$1,600,000
- Winner's share: US$289,153

Champion
- (United States) Pete Oakley
- 284 (-4)
- Location in Europe Location in the United Kingdom Location in Ireland Location in Northern Ireland

The 2004 Senior British Open Championship, for sponsorship reasons named Senior British Open Championship presented by MasterCard, was a senior major golf championship and the 18th Senior British Open Championship, held from 22 to 25 July at Royal Portrush Golf Club in Portrush, County Antrim, Northern Ireland, United Kingdom. It was the second Senior British Open Championship played as a senior major championship.

Pete Oakley won by one stroke over Tom Kite and Eduardo Romero to win his first Senior British Open title and his first senior major championship victory.

Graham Marsh, who finished tied ninth, became the first player on the four main golf tours (PGA Tour, PGA European Tour, PGA Tour Champions or the Legends Tour) to ace the same hole twice in a tournament, when he had a hole-in-one on the 170-yard 11th hole in the third round with an 8-iron, as well as with a 9-iron in the first round.

== Venue ==
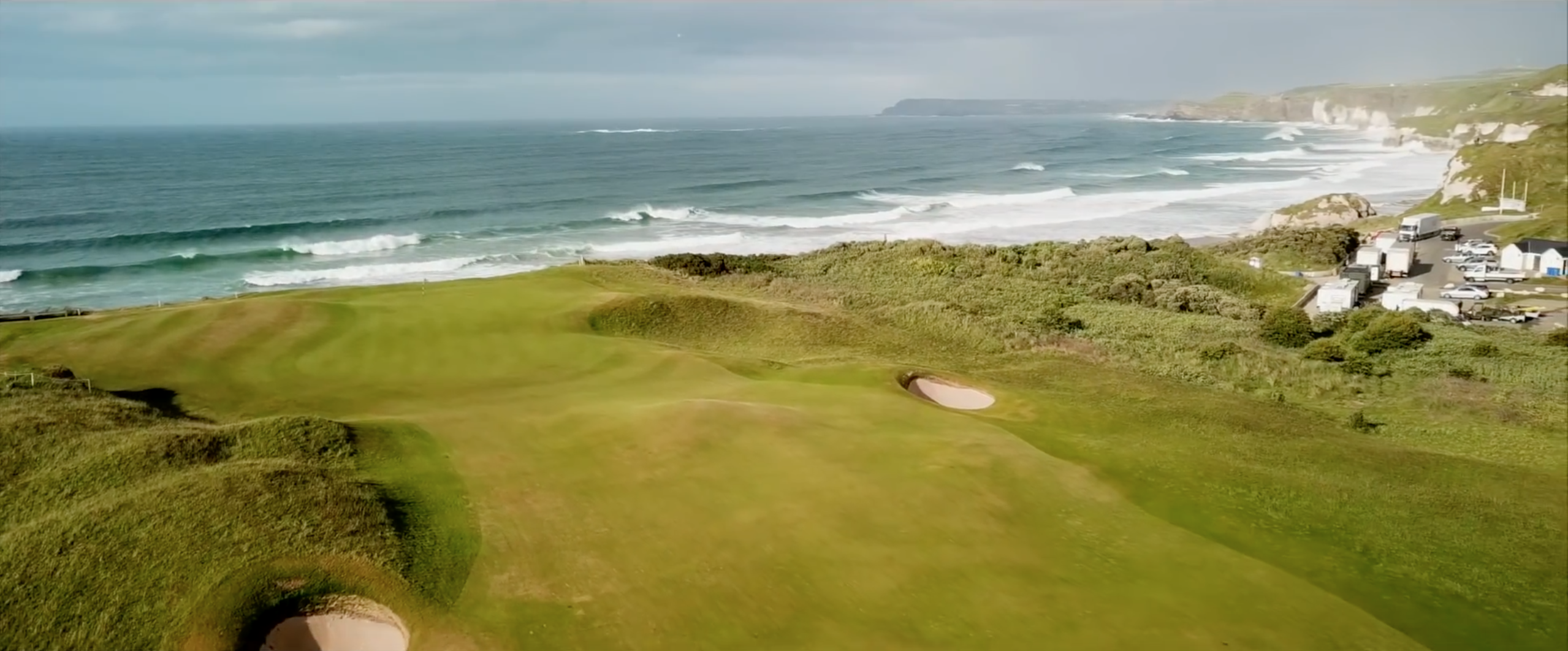
Royal Portrush GC 5th hole

=== Course layout ===
Name	Hole	Par	Yards
Hughie's	1	4	392
Giant's Grave	2	5	505
Islay	3	3	155
Fred Daly's	4	4	457
White Rocks	5	4	411
Harry Colt's	6	3	189
P.G. Stevenson's	7	4	431
Himalayas	8	4	393
Tavern	9	5	475
Dhu Varren	10	5	478
Feather Bed	11	3	170
Causeway	12	4	392
Skerries	13	4	340
Calamity Corner	14	3	210
Purgatory	15	4	365
Babington's	16	4	442
Glenarm	17	5	548
Greenaway	18	4	469
	Out	36	3,408
	In	36	3,414
	Total	72	6,822

== Field ==
The field consisted of 144 competitors; 138 professionals and six amateurs.

70 players made the 36-hole cut, 69 professionals and one amateur. Roy Smethurst finished leading amateur at tied 41st.

An 18-hole stroke play qualifying round was held on Monday, 19 July, on Valley Links, for players who were not already exempt. The 27 leading players from the qualifying competition joined the 117 exempt players for the championship.

=== Past champions in the field ===
Eight past Senior Open champions participated. Three of them made the 36-hole cut; 2003 champion Tom Watson (tied 22nd), 2002 champion Noboru Sugai (tied 46th) and 1989 and 1993 champion Bob Charles (tied 65th). 1987 champion Neil Coles, 1999 and 2000 champion Christy O'Connor Jnr, 1991 champion Bobby Verway, 2001 champion Ian Stanley and 1988, 1990 and 1997 champion Gary Player did not make the cut.

=== Past winners and runners-up at The Open Championship in the field ===
The field included three former winners of The Open Championship. Two of them made the cut; 1975, 1977, 1980, 1982 and 1983 Open champion Tom Watson (tied 22nd), and 1963 Open champion Bob Charles (tied 65th). 1959, 1968 and 1974 Open champion Gary Player did not make the cut.

The field also included seven former runners-up at The Open Championship; Tom Kite (2nd), Mark McNulty (tied 5th), Andy Bean (tied 13th), Simon Owen (tied 38th), Ben Crenshaw (missed cut), Neil Coles (missed cut) and Rodger Davis (missed cut).

== Final round summary and results ==
Sunday, 25 July 2004

Pete Oakley sank a 10-foot par putt on the final hole to win by one stroke and avoid a playoff. The victory made him only the 10th open qualifier to win a Champions Tour event. Defending champion Tom Watson, who withdrew from The Open Championship the week before, due to a shoulder injury, finished tied 22nd, 13 shots from the winner.

Place	Player	Score	To par	Money ($)
1	(United States) Pete Oakley	73-68-73-70=284	−4	289,153
T2	(United States) Tom Kite	71-71-74-69=285	−3	150,715
T2	(Argentina) Eduardo Romero	69-75-74-67=285	−3	150,715
4	(England) Mark James	72-70-74-70=286	−2	86,764
T5	(Republic of Ireland) Mark McNulty	72-69-74-72=287	−1	67,121
T5	(United States) Don Pooley	69-72-74-72=287	−1	67,121
7	(Scotland) Bill Longmuir	71-71-76-72=290	+2	52,040
8	(England) Carl Mason	70-71-81-69=291	+3	43,336
T9	(South Africa) Bobby Lincoln	78-69-73-72=292	+4	33,799
T9	(Australia) Graham Marsh	76-73-72-71=292	+4	33,799
T9	(United States) Bruce Summerhays	73-73-75-71=292	+4	33,799
T9	(Scotland) Sam Torrance	72-73-78-69=292	+4	33,799

Preceded by 2004 Ford Senior Players Championship	Senior Major Championships	Succeeded by 2004 U.S. Senior Open
