= 2000 Senior British Open =

Tournament information
- Dates: 27–30 July 2000
- Location: Newcastle, County Down, Northern Ireland, United Kingdom; 54.218°N 5.884°W
- Course: Royal County Down Golf Club
- Organised by: The R&A
- Tours: European Seniors Tour; Senior PGA Tour
- Format: 72 holes stroke play

Statistics
- Par: 71
- Length: 6,609 yd (6,043 m)
- Field: 132 players, 64 after cut
- Cut: 150 (+8)
- Prize fund: €651,612
- Winner's share: €102,758

Champion
- (Republic of Ireland) Christy O'Connor Jnr
- 275 (−9)
- Location in Europe Location in British Isles Location in Ireland Location in Northern Ireland

The 2000 Senior British Open, for sponsor reasons named Senior British Open presented by MasterCard, was a professional golf tournament for players aged 50 and above and the 14th British Senior Open Championship, held from 27 to 30 July at Royal County Down Golf Club in Newcastle, County Down, Northern Ireland, United Kingdom.

In 2018, the tournament was, as all Senior British Open Championships played 1987–2002, retroactively recognized as a senior major golf championship and a PGA Tour Champions (at the time named the Senior PGA Tour) event.

Christy O'Connor Jnr beat John Bland by two strokes and successfully defended his Senior British Open title from 1999. Bland repeated his second-place finish from the year before.

== Venue ==
The hosting course, one of the oldest on the island of Ireland, originally designed by Old Tom Morris and located in natural links settings in the Murlough Nature Reserve, stretching along the shores of Dundrum Bay, was established in 1889.

The course had previously hosted several editions of the Irish Open, The Amateur Championship, the British Ladies Amateur Golf Championship and the 1968 Curtis Cup.

The event was the first of three editions of the Senior British Open held at the Royal County Down Golf Club three years in a row.

=== Course layout ===
Hole	Yards	Par	Hole	Yards	Par
1	502	5	10	197	3
2	371	4	11	384	4
3	454	4	12	479	5
4	194	3	13	421	4
5	416	4	14	202	3
6	369	4	15	449	4
7	144	3	16	276	4
8	424	4	17	375	4
9	424	4	18	528	5
Out	3,298	35	In	3,311	36
Source:		Total		6,609	71

== Field ==
132 players, 124 professionals and eight amateurs, entered the competition.

Two qualifying tournaments were held on Tuesday 25 July. 28 players, 25 professionals and three amateurs qualified through an 18-hole qualifying round at Kilkeel Golf Club. 28 players, 25 professionals and three amateurs qualified through an 18-hole qualifying round at Spa Golf Club on 24 July. They joined 76 players, who were exempt into the championship.

One player withdraw before the cut. 64 players, 60 professionals and four amateurs, made the 36-hole cut. Ken Forster finished leading amateur at tied 33rd.

=== Past champions in the field ===
Eight past Senior Open champions participated. Four of them made the 36-hole cut; 1999 champion Christy O'Connor Jnr (won), 1989 and 1993 champion Bob Charles (tied 5th). 1987 champion Neil Coles, (tied 10th) and 1991 champion Bobby Verway (tied 12th).1992 champion John Fourie, 1998 champion Brian Huggett, 1988, 1990 and 1997 champion Gary Player missed the cut. 1995 and 1996 champion Brian Barnes withdraw during the first round.

=== Past winners and runners-up at The Open Championship in the field ===
The field included two former winners of The Open Championship. One of them made the cut; 1963 Open champion Bob Charles (tied 5th). 1959, 1968 and 1974 Open champion Gary Player did not make the cut.

The field also included two former runners-up at The Open Championship; Neil Coles (tied 10th) and Brian Huggett (missed the cut).

== Final results ==
Sunday, 30 July 2000

Place	Player	Score	To par	Money (€)
1	(Republic of Ireland) Christy O'Connor Jnr	69-68-70-68=275	−9	102,758.06
2	(South Africa) John Bland	68-67-71-71=277	−7	65,421.01
3	(United States) Hubert Green	68-72-68-71=279	−5	38,018.86
4	(England) John Morgan	71-71-69-69=280	−4	30,843.65
5	(New Zealand) Bob Charles	75-68-71-67=281	−3	25,324.26
T6	(Japan) Seiji Ebihara	71-70-70-74=285	+1	20,291.88
T6	(England) Tommy Horton	75-69-68-73=285	+1	20,291.88
T6	(Australia) Noel Ratcliffe	67-73-71-74=285	+1	20,291.88
T6	(United States) Dave Stockton	73-69-73-70=285	+1	20,291.88
T10	(England) Neil Coles	72-71-71-72=286	+2	15,503.00
T10	(England) Malcolm Gregson	76-68-69-73=286	+2	15,503.00

Preceded by 2000 Ford Senior Players Championship	Senior Major Championships	Succeeded by 2001 Senior PGA Championship
