= 2003 Senior British Open =

Tournament information
- Dates: 24–27 July 2003
- Location: South Ayrshire, Scotland; 55.316°N 4.833°W
- Course: Turnberry
- Organised by: The R&A
- Tours: European Senior Tour; Champions Tour
- Format: 72 holes stroke play

Statistics
- Par: 70
- Length: 6,715 yd (6,140 m)
- Field: 144 players, 77 after cut
- Cut: 144 (+4)
- Prize fund: US$1,590,377
- Winner's share: US$255,731 €222,779

Champion
- (United States) Tom Watson
- 263 (−17)

Location map
- Location in Europe Location in the United Kingdom Location in Scotland

The 2003 Senior British Open was a senior major golf championship and the 17th Senior British Open, held from 24–27 July at Turnberry in South Ayrshire, Scotland. It was the 5th Senior British Open played at the course and the first Senior British Open played as a senior major championship.

Tom Watson defeated Carl Mason in a playoff to win his first Senior British Open title and his second senior major championship victory.

== Venue ==
The 2003 event was the 5th Senior British Open played at Turnberry.

=== Course layout ===
Hole	Name	Yards	Par	Hole	Name	Yards	Par
1	Ailsa Craig	358	4	10	Dinna Fouter	415	4
2	Mak Siccar	381	4	11	Maidens	174	3
3	Blaw Wearie	409	4	12	Monument	414	4
4	Woe-Be-Tide	165	3	13	Tickly Tap	412	4
5	Fin Me Oot	416	4	14	Risk-An-Hope	441	4
6	Tappie Toorie	221	3	15	Ca' Canny	209	3
7	Roon The Ben	475	5	16	Wee Burn	409	4
8	Goat Fell	431	4	17	Lang Whang	497	5
9	Bruce's Castle	454	4	18	Duel in the Sun	434	4
Out		3,310	35	In		3,405	35
Source:		Total				6,715	70

== Field ==
The field consisted of 144 competitors: 139 professionals and 5 amateurs.

18-hole stroke play qualifying rounds were held on Monday, 21 July, on two places in Scotland, the Barassie Links in Kilmarnock and the Kintyre course at Turnberry, for players who were not already exempt. The 31 leading players from the qualifying competitions joined the 113 exempt players for the championship.

77 players made the 36-hole cut, 76 professionals and one amateur. Arthur Pierce, Ireland, finished leading amateur at tied 62nd.

=== Past champions in the field ===
==== Made the cut ====
Player	Country	Year(s) won	R1	R2	R3	R4	Total	To par	Finish
Bob Charles	New Zealand	1989, 1993	69	68	69	71	277	−3	T20
Noboru Sugai	Japan	2002	67	73	72	71	283	+3	T46
Gary Player	South Africa	1988, 1990, 1997	73	70	69	72	284	+4	T51
Christy O'Connor Jnr	Ireland	1999, 2000	73	71	70	71	285	+5	T54

==== Missed the cut ====
Player	Country	Year(s) won	R1	R2	Total	To par
John Fourie	South Africa	1992	71	74	145	+5
Neil Coles	England	1987	72	74	146	+6
Ian Stanley	Australia	2001	79	74	153	+13
Bobby Verwey	South Africa	1991	86	69	155	+15

=== Past winners and runners-up at The Open Championship in the field ===
The field included five former winners of The Open Championship. Four of them made the cut; 1975, 1977, 1980, 1982 and 1983 Open champion Tom Watson (won), 1966, 1970 and 1978 Open champion Jack Nicklaus (tied 14th), 1963 Open champion Bob Charles (tied 20th) and 1959, 1968 and 1974 Open champion Gary Player (tied 51st). 1961 and 1962 Open champion Arnold Palmer did not make the cut.

The field also included three former runners-up at The Open Championship; Tom Kite (4th), Rodger Davis (tied 27th) and Simon Owen (tied 32nd).

== Round summaries ==
=== First round ===
Thursday, 24 July 2003

Tom Kite and Tom Watson posted four-under-par 66's on day one to lead by one shot.

Place	Player	Score	To par
1	(United States) Tom Kite	66	−4
1	(United States) Tom Watson	66	−4
T3	(England) Denis Durnian	67	−3
T3	(England) Carl Mason	67	−3
T3	(United States) Mark McCumber	67	−3
T3	(Republic of Ireland) Des Smyth	67	−3
T3	(Japan) Noboru Sugai	67	−3
T3	(Scotland) Russell Weir	67	−3
T3	(United States) Fuzzy Zoeller	67	−3
T10	(England) Maurice Bembridge	68	−2
T10	(England) Malcolm Gregson	68	−2
T10	(Canada) Bill Hardwick	68	−2
T10	(United States) Bruce Summerhays	68	−2

=== Second round ===
Friday 25 July 2003

Carl Mason shot a 64 (−6) to take a one-shot lead over D.A. Weibring, who shot a seven-under-par 63.

Place	Player	Score	To par
1	(England) Carl Mason	67-64=131	−9
2	(United States) D. A. Weibring	69-63=132	−8
T3	(United States) Tom Kite	66-67=133	−7
T3	(United States) Bruce Summerhays	68-65=133	−7
T3	(United States) Tom Watson	66-67=133	−7
T6	(United States) Jim Colbert	72-62=134	−6
T6	(Scotland) Russell Weir	67-67=134	−6
8	(England) Denis Durnian	67-68=135	−5
T9	(England) Bob Cameron	69-67=136	−4
T9	(Australia) Terry Gale	70-66=136	−4
T9	(United States) Mark McCumber	67-69=136	−4
T9	(United States) Dana Quigley	71-65=136	−4
T9	(United States) Bobby Wadkins	71-65=136	−4
T9	(United States) Fuzzy Zoeller	67-69=136	−4

Amateurs: Pierse (−1), Reynolds (+5), Boles (+9), Baldwin (+11), MacNamara (+15)

=== Third round ===
Saturday, 26 July 2003

Mason and Weibring shot matching rounds of 65 (−5) as Mason maintained his one shot lead. Kite, Summerhays, and Watson all shot rounds of 66 (−4) to trail Mason by three shots. Jim Colbert backed up his eight-under-par 62 with a 66 (−4) in the third round, trailing Mason by 4 strokes.

Place	Player	Score	To par
1	(England) Carl Mason	67-64-65=196	−14
2	(United States) D. A. Weibring	69-63-65=197	−13
T3	(United States) Tom Kite	66-67-66=199	−11
T3	(United States) Bruce Summerhays	68-65-66=199	−11
T3	(United States) Tom Watson	66-67-66=199	−11
6	(United States) Jim Colbert	72-62-66=200	−10
7	(United States) Mark McCumber	67-69-65=201	−9
8	(Australia) Brian Jones	69-69-65=203	−7
T9	(Japan) Isao Aoki	66-67-66=204	−6
T9	(England) Bob Cameron	69-67-68=204	−6
T9	(England) Denis Durnian	67-68-69=204	−6
T9	(United States) Jack Nicklaus	70-67-67=204	−6
T9	(United States) Fuzzy Zoeller	67-69-68=204	−6

Amateurs: Pierse (+2)

=== Final round ===
Sunday, 27 July 2003

Tom Watson trailed Carl Mason by one stroke heading into the 72nd hole. Needing birdie to tie Mason, Watson bogeyed the par-4 18th hole to fall two shots behind the leader. Mason, now leading by 2 strokes, double bogeyed the 18th hole and fell into a playoff with Watson.

Place	Player	Score	To par	Money (€)
T1	(England) Carl Mason	67-64-65-67=263	−17	Playoff
T1	(United States) Tom Watson	66-67-66-64=263	−17	Playoff
3	(United States) Bruce Summerhays	68-65-66-65=264	−16	83,648
4	(United States) Tom Kite	66-67-66-67=266	−14	66,848
5	(United States) D. A. Weibring	69-63-65-73=270	−10	56,641
T6	(Australia) Brian Jones	69-69-65-68=271	−9	43,440
T6	(United States) Mark McCumber	67-69-65-70=271	−9	43,440
T8	(United States) Denis Durnian	67-68-69-68=272	−8	31,673
T8	(United States) David Eger	71-68-66-67=272	−8	31,673
T10	(United States) Jim Colbert	72-62-66-73=273	−7	24,734
T10	(Australia) Graham Marsh	71-68-66-68=273	−7	24,734
T10	(United States) Dana Quigley	71-65-70-67=273	−7	24,734

Amateurs: Pierse (+6)

=== Playoff ===
Sunday, 27 July 2003

Tom Watson and Carl Mason both parred the first playoff hole. Watson won with par on the second playoff hole as Mason made bogey.

Place	Player	Score	To par	Money (€)
1	(United States) Tom Watson	4-4=8	E	222,779
2	(England) Carl Mason	4-5=9	+1	148,590

== Notes and references ==
Preceded by 2003 Senior Players Championship	Senior Major Championships	Succeeded by 2003 JELD-WEN Tradition
