= Doug McClelland (golfer) =

English golfer (born 1949)

Personal information
- Full name: Douglas William McClelland
- Nationality: England
- Born: 30 November 1949 (age 76) South Shields, England
- Height: 6 ft 0 in (1.83 m)
- Weight: 224 lb (102 kg; 16.0 st)

Career
- Sport: Golf
- Turned professional: 1969
- Former tour: European Tour
- Professional wins: 2

Number of wins by tour
- European Tour: 1
- Other: 1

Best results in major championships
- Masters Tournament: DNP
- PGA Championship: DNP
- U.S. Open: DNP
- The Open Championship: T14: 1973

Douglas William McClelland (born 30 November 1949) is an English professional golfer who played on the European Tour from 1971 to 1979. In 1973 he won the Dutch Open and was runner-up in the Benson & Hedges Match Play Championship, losing to Neil Coles in the final. In 1977 he finished fourth in the Penfold PGA Championship and third in the Martini International behind a young Greg Norman.

McClelland was twice in contention for a Ryder Cup place. In 1973 he finished 22nd in the Ryder Cup points list but was a possible choice having shown good form in the tournaments just before the four selections were made. The selectors, however, chose the players in 9th to 12th place in the points list. In 1977 McClelland finished 10th in the points list but the selectors chose two experienced players, Tony Jacklin and Neil Coles, together with two rookies, Ken Brown and Mark James, who had finished 9th and 11th in the points list.

== Professional wins (2) ==
=== European Tour wins (1) ===
No.	Date	Tournament	Winning score	Margin of victory	Runner-up
1	12 Aug 1973	Dutch Open	−9 (72-67-72-68=279)	1 stroke	(England) Peter Oosterhuis

=== Other wins (1) ===
- 1980 Sunningdale Foursomes (with Neil Coles)

== Results in major championships ==
Tournament	1970	1971	1972	1973	1974	1975	1976	1977	1978
The Open Championship	CUT	CUT	T23	T14	T28		T48	CUT	CUT

Note: McClelland only played in The Open Championship.

Did not play

CUT = missed the half-way cut (3rd round cut in 1977 and 1978 Open Championships)
"T" = tied

== Team appearances ==
- Double Diamond International (representing England): 1972 (winners)
- Japan-Britain Match (representing Great Britain): 1974 (winners)
