= Ballantine Tournament =

Tournament information
- Location: Virginia Water, Surrey, England
- Established: 1960
- Course(s): Wentworth Club
- Final year: 1961

Final champion
- Neil Coles

Location in England

The Ballantine Tournament was a professional golf tournament played at the Wentworth Club in England. The event was played twice, in 1960 and 1961 and was sponsored by George Ballantine & Son Ltd, whisky proprietors.

The 1960 event was the first major tournament in Britain in which the use of the larger "American" ball (1.68 in, 42.67 mm) was compulsory. The larger ball was also used in 1961.

== Winners ==
Year	Winner	Country	Score	Margin of victory	Runner-up	Winner's share (£)	Ref
1960	Christy O'Connor Snr	Ireland	277	2 strokes	(Scotland) John Panton	1,250	
1961	Neil Coles	England	277	5 strokes	(England) Ken Bousfield	1,500	
