= 1964 Piccadilly World Match Play Championship =

First World Match Play Championship (golf)

Coordinates: 51°23′48″N 0°35′45″W

Tournament information
- Dates: 9–11 October 1964
- Location: Virginia Water, Surrey, England
- Course: West Course, Wentworth
- Format: Match play – 36 holes

Statistics
- Par: 75
- Length: 6,936 yards (6,342 m)
- Field: 8 players
- Prize fund: £16,000
- Winner's share: £5,000

Champion
- (United States) Arnold Palmer
- def. Neil Coles 2 & 1

Location in England

The 1964 Piccadilly World Match Play Championship was the first World Match Play Championship. It was played from Friday 9 to Sunday 11 October on the West Course at Wentworth. Eight players competed in a straight knock-out competition, with each match contested over 36 holes. The champion received £5,000 out of a total prize fund of £16,000. Arnold Palmer defeated Neil Coles 2&1 in the final to win the tournament.

The tournament was sponsored by Carreras Tobacco Company the manufacturer of Piccadilly cigarettes.

In the final, Palmer led by two after nine holes but Coles won the 11th, 12th, 13th and the 18th to reach lunch two holes up. Coles was round in 72 to Palmer's 74. In the afternoon Palmer went 2–3–3 from the 5th to the 7th to lead by one, reaching the turn in 32. Palmer won the 15th with a three and eventually won 2&1, having completed the 17 holes in the afternoon in 61 strokes.

The match play championship concluded a week of golf at Wentworth which had started with the Piccadilly Tournament, a 72-hole stroke play competition, which was played on the East Course from 5 to 7 October. The winner was Jimmy Martin who took home £750 of the total prize fund of £4,000.

== Course ==
Hole	1	2	3	4	5	6	7	8	9	Out	10	11	12	13	14	15	16	17	18	In	Total
Yards	470	156	444	505	186	342	402	398	453	3,356	186	379	480	440	176	479	380	556	504	3,580	6,936
Par	5	3	5	5	3	4	4	4	4	37	3	4	5	4	3	5	4	5	5	38	75

== Scores ==
Quarter-finals; 9 October
(United States) Arnold Palmer	1 up
(England) Peter Butler
(United States) Ken Venturi
(South Africa) Gary Player	4 & 2
(England) Neil Coles	4 & 3
(United States) Tony Lema
(Australia) Bruce Devlin	3 & 2
(United States) Jack Nicklaus

Semi-finals; 10 October
(United States) Arnold Palmer	8 & 6
(South Africa) Gary Player
(England) Neil Coles	2 & 1
(Australia) Bruce Devlin

Final; 11 October
(United States) Arnold Palmer	2 & 1
(England) Neil Coles

== Prize money ==
The winner received £5,000, the runner-up £3,000, the losing semi-finalists £2,000 and the first round losers £1,000, making a total prize fund of £16,000.
