= 1997 Senior British Open =

Tournament information
- Dates: 24–27 July 1997
- Location: Portrush, County Antrim, Northern Ireland, United Kingdom; 55.200°N 6.635°W
- Courses: Royal Portrush Golf Club; Dunluce Links
- Organised by: The R&A
- Tours: European Senior Tour; Senior PGA Tour
- Format: 72 holes stroke play

Statistics
- Par: 72
- Length: 6,692 yd (6,119 m)
- Field: 121 players, 71 after cut
- Cut: 150 (+6)
- Prize fund: €352,665
- Winner's share: €81,662

Champion
- (South Africa) Gary Player
- 278 (−10)
- Location in Europe Location in the United Kingdom Location in Ireland Location in Northern Ireland

The 1997 Senior British Open was a professional golf tournament for players aged 50 and above and the 11th British Senior Open Championship, held from 24 to 27 July at Royal Portrush Golf Club in Portrush, County Antrim, Northern Ireland, United Kingdom.

In 2018, the tournament was, as all Senior British Open Championships played 1987–2002, retroactively recognized as a senior major golf championship and a PGA Tour Champions (at the time named the Senior PGA Tour) event.

62-year-old Gary Player won in a playoff over John Bland to win his third Senior British Open title and ninth senior major championship victory.

== Venue ==
The event was the third Senior Open Championship in a row held at Royal Portrush Golf Club.

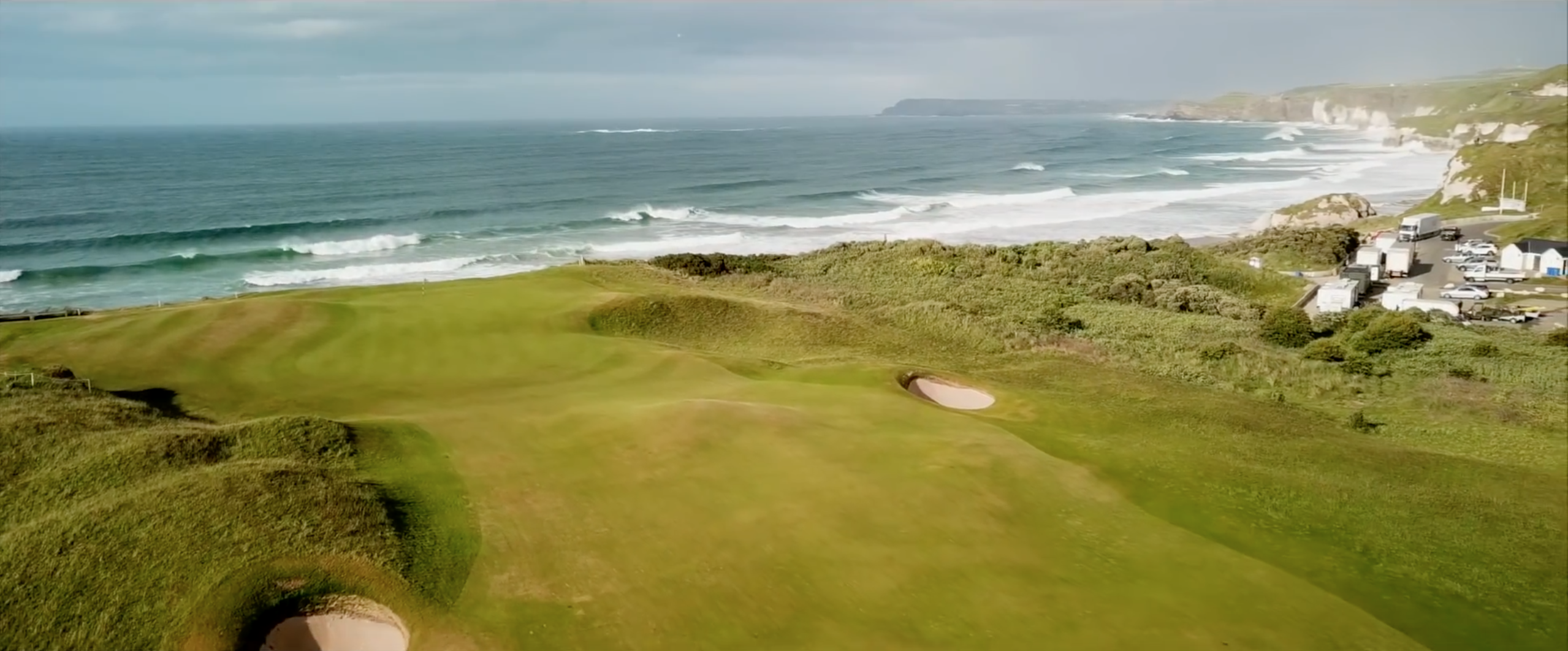
Royal Portrush GC 5th hole

== Field ==
121 professionals, no amateurs, entered the competition. One of them withdrew and one was disqualified. 71 players made the 36-hole cut.

=== Past champions in the field ===
Seven past Senior British Open champions participated. Six of them made the 36-hole cut; 1988 and 1990 champion Gary Player (won), 1991 champion Bobby Verwey (tied 5th), 1994 champion Tom Wargo (tied 6th), 1992 champion John Fourie (tied 15th), 1987 champion Neil Coles (tied 24th) and 1989 and 1993 champion Bob Charles (tied 34th). 1995 and 1996 champion Brian Barnes withdraw after a first round 2-under-par 70.

=== Past winners and runners-up at The Open Championship in the field ===
The field included two former winners of The Open Championship. Both of them made the cut, 1959, 1968 and 1974 Open champion Gary Player (won) and 1963 Open champion Bob Charles (tied 34th).

The field also included three former runners-up at The Open Championship. Neil Coles (24th), Brian Huggett (tied 26th) and Christy O'Connor Snr (missed the cut).

== Final round and playoff summaries ==
=== Final round ===
Sunday, 27 July 1997

Gary Player, South Africa and his fellow countryman John Bland tied the lead after the fourth round, to meet in a sudden death playoff, to decide the winner. Player scored a bogey-free 68 in the final round, to catch up Bland, who led by two strokes before the final round.

Noel Ratcliffe scored a bogey 5 on the 18th hole of the final round to came one shot short of joining the playoff.

Place	Player	Score	To par	Money (€)
T1	(South Africa) John Bland	66-72-70-70=278	−10	Playoff
T1	(South Africa) Gary Player	68-70-72-68=278	−10	Playoff
T3	(Australia) Noel Ratcliffe	70-65-75-69=279	−9	27,589
T3	(England) Jim Rhodes	69-71-71-68=279	−9	27,589
5	(South Africa) Bobby Verwey	71-70-72-68=281	−7	20,776
T6	(Spain) José María Cañizares	76-72-68-66=282	−6	15,925
T6	(United States) Tom Wargo	71-70-69-72=282	−6	15,925
T8	(United States) Dave Eichelberger	68-71-75-69=283	−5	11,613
T8	(United States) Walter Hall	75-70-71-67=283	−5	11,613
T10	(England) Tommy Horton	71-72-72-70=285	−3	9,408
T10	(Northern Ireland) Paul Leonard	72-70-74-69=285	−3	9,408

=== Playoff ===
Sunday, 27 July 1997

The sudden-death playoff went on, to be played until one of the players had a lower score on the hole than the other. Gary Player beat John Bland with a birdie at the second extra hole, the par 5 17th hole, by holing a 15-foot putt.

Place	Player	Score	To par	Money (€)
1	(South Africa) Gary Player	5-4	−1	81,662
2	(South Africa) John Bland	5-5	E	54,390

Preceded by 1997 Ford Senior Players Championship	Senior Major Championships	Succeeded by 1998 The Tradition Presented by Countrywide
