= 1980 Open Championship =

Coordinates: 56.043°N 2.823°W

Tournament information
- Dates: 17–20 July 1980
- Location: Gullane, Scotland
- Course: Muirfield
- Tour(s): European Tour; PGA Tour

Statistics
- Par: 71
- Length: 6,926 yards (6,333 m)
- Field: 151 players 87 after 1st cut 65 after 2nd cut
- Cut: 149 (+7) (1st cut); 219 (+6) (2nd cut)
- Prize fund: £200,000 $480,000
- Winner's share: £25,000 $60,000

Champion
- (United States) Tom Watson
- 271 (−13)

Location in Scotland

The 1980 Open Championship was a men's major golf championship and the 109th Open Championship, held from 17 to 20 July at Muirfield Golf Links in Gullane, Scotland. Tom Watson won his third Open Championship, four strokes ahead of runner-up Lee Trevino. It was the fourth of Watson's eight major titles; he won two additional Opens in 1982 and 1983. It was Watson's first win in a major in three years.

Trevino, 40, had won the last Open played at Muirfield in 1972, successfully defending his 1971 title and ending the grand slam bid of Jack Nicklaus. Nicklaus, also 40, tied for fourth. He won at Muirfield in 1966 and was runner-up by a stroke in 1972.

This was the first Open scheduled to end on a Sunday, with a Thursday start. The Open previously began on Wednesday and ended on Saturday. Prior to 1966, the final two rounds were scheduled for Friday. In 1970 and 1975, 18-hole playoffs were held on Sunday.

== Round summaries ==
=== First round ===
Thursday, 17 July 1980

Place	Player	Score	To par
T1	(United States) Lee Trevino	68	−3
T1	(United States) Tom Watson	68	−3
T3	(England) Nick Faldo	69	−2
T3	(Argentina) Vicente Fernández	69	−2
T3	(England) Mark James	69	−2
T3	(Australia) Jack Newton	69	−2
T3	(England) Glenn Ralph	69	−2
T8	(Scotland) Ken Brown	70	−1
T8	(United States) Ben Crenshaw	70	−1
T8	(United States) Mark Hayes	70	−1
T8	(Scotland) Sandy Lyle	70	−1
T8	(United States) Gil Morgan	70	−1

=== Second round ===
Friday, 18 July 1980

Place	Player	Score	To par
1	(United States) Lee Trevino	68-67=135	−7
T2	(Scotland) Ken Brown	70-68=138	−4
T2	(United States) Jerry Pate	71-67=138	−4
T2	(United States) Tom Watson	68-70=138	−4
T5	(Spain) Seve Ballesteros	72-68=140	−2
T5	(United States) Andy Bean	71-69=140	−2
T5	(United States) Ben Crenshaw	70-70=140	−2
T5	(United States) Gil Morgan	70-70=140	−2
T5	(Australia) Jack Newton	69-71=140	−2
T5	(United States) Jack Nicklaus	73-67=140	−2

Amateurs: Sigel (+2), Rafferty (+9), McLean (+10), Mitchell (+10), Evans (+11), Gallagher (+12), Way (+12), Boxall (+13), McEvoy (+13), Deeble (+14), McCathie (+17), Hay (+19)

=== Third round ===
Saturday, 19 July 1980

Place	Player	Score	To par
1	(United States) Tom Watson	68-70-64=202	−11
T2	(Scotland) Ken Brown	70-68-68=206	−7
T2	(United States) Lee Trevino	68-67-71=206	−7
4	(United States) Ben Crenshaw	70-70-68=208	−5
T5	(United States) Andy Bean	71-69-70=210	−3
T5	(United States) Hubert Green	77-69-64=210	−3
T7	(Japan) Isao Aoki	74-74-63=211	−2
T7	(Scotland) Sandy Lyle	70-71-70=211	−2
T7	(England) Carl Mason	72-69-70=211	−2
T7	(United States) Gil Morgan	70-70-71=211	−2
T7	(United States) Jack Nicklaus	73-67-71=211	−2
T7	(United States) Craig Stadler	72-70-69=211	−2

Amateurs: Sigel (+5)

=== Final round ===
Sunday, 20 July 1980

Place	Player	Score	To par	Money (£)
1	(United States) Tom Watson	68-70-64-69=271	−13	25,000
2	(United States) Lee Trevino	68-67-71-69=275	−9	17,500
3	(United States) Ben Crenshaw	70-70-68-69=277	−7	13,500
T4	(England) Carl Mason	72-69-70-69=280	−4	9,250
T4	(United States) Jack Nicklaus	73-67-71-69=280	−4	9,250
T6	(United States) Andy Bean	71-69-70-72=282	−2	7,250
T6	(Scotland) Ken Brown	70-68-68-76=282	−2	7,250
T6	(United States) Hubert Green	77-69-64-72=282	−2	7,250
T6	(United States) Craig Stadler	72-70-69-71=282	−2	7,250
T10	(United States) Gil Morgan	70-70-71-72=283	−1	5,750
T10	(Australia) Jack Newton	69-71-73-70=283	−1	5,750

- Amateurs: Sigel (+7)
- The exchange rate at the time was approximately 2.37 dollars (US) per pound sterling.
