= 1989 Seniors' British Open =

Tournament information
- Dates: 27–30 July 1989
- Location: South Ayrshire, Scotland, United Kingdom; 55.316°N 4.833°W
- Course: Turnberry (Aisla Course)
- Organised by: The R&A
- Tour: Senior PGA Tour
- Format: 72 holes stroke play

Statistics
- Par: 70
- Length: 6,480 yd (5,930 m)
- Prize fund: £150,000
- Winner's share: £25,000

Champion
- (New Zealand) Bob Charles
- 269 (−11)
- Location in Europe Location in the United Kingdom Location in Scotland

The 1989 Seniors' British Open, for sponsorship reasons also known as the Volvo Seniors' British Open, was a professional golf tournament for players aged 50 and above and the third Seniors' British Open (later known as the Senior Open Championship), held from 27 to 30 July at Turnberry Golf Resort in South Ayrshire, Scotland, United Kingdom.

In 2018, the tournament was, as all Senior British Open Championships played 1987–2002, retroactively recognized as a senior major golf championship and a PGA Tour Champions (at the time named the Senior PGA Tour) event.

Bob Charles, with an 11-under-par score of 269, won by seven strokes ahead of Billy Casper, to capture his first Senior British Open title and first senior major championship.

Defending champion Gary Player finished tied 4th, 13 strokes behind the winner.

A £2,000 bonus prize was awarded to 64-year-old Christy O'Connor Snr, as the leading player over 60 years of age, at tied 8th at 284, 4 over par.

Leading amateurs were Gordon Clark and Charlie Green, tied at 299, 19 over par.

== Venue ==
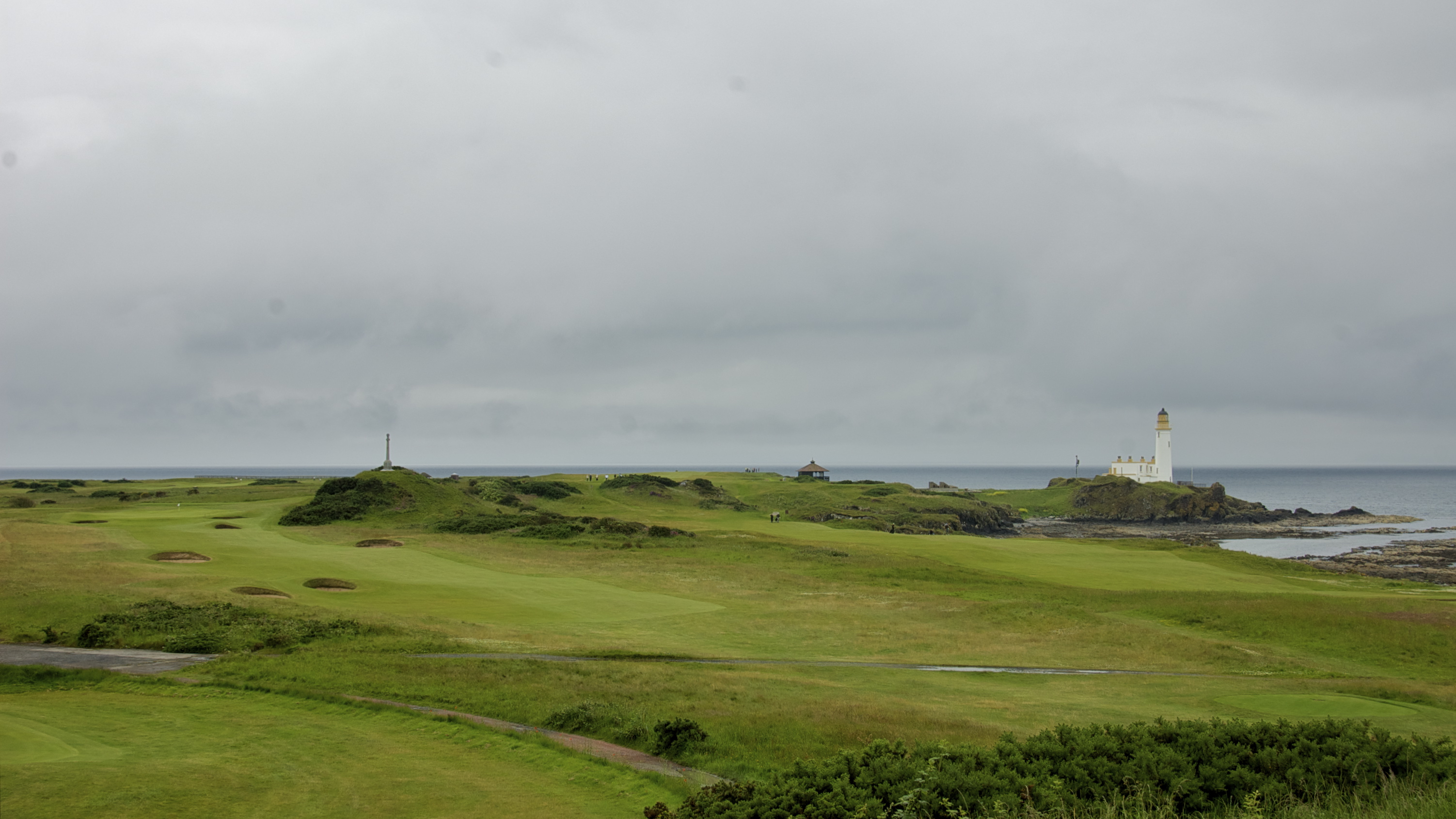
The 10th and 12th holes on the Ailsa course

The Ailsa Course at Turnberry, situated 80 kilometres south of Glasgow, Scotland, on headland along the Firth of Clyde, overlooking the Isle of Arran and Ailsa Craig, was initially opened with 13 holes in 1901, designed by Willie Fernie, and later completed to 18 holes. It was redesigned by Mackenzie Ross between 1949 and 1951.

The championship was the third of four in a row played at Turnberry.

The course had previously hosted The Open Championship twice; 1977 and 1986.

== Field ==
=== Past champions in the field ===
Both of the two past Senior British Open champions participated and made the 36-hole cut, 1988 champion Gary Player (tied 4th) and 1987 champion Neil Coles (6th).

=== Past winners and runners-up at The Open Championship in the field ===
The field included three former winners of The Open Championship. All of them made the cut, Bob Charles (won), Gary Player (tied 4th) and Arnold Palmer (8th).

The field also included three former runners-up at The Open Championship. Neil Coles (6th), Christy O'Connor Snr (7th) and Doug Sanders (tied 24th).

== Final results ==
Sunday, 30 July 1989

Place	Player	Score	To par	Money (£)
1	(New Zealand) Bob Charles	70-68-65-66=269	−11	25,000
2	(United States) Billy Casper	67-69-65-75=276	−4	16,400
3	(United States) Babe Hiskey	71-71-65-72=279	−1	9,150
T4	(England) David Butler	72-74-67-69=282	+2	6,750
T4	(South Africa) Gary Player	74-68-69-71=282	+2	6,750
6	(England) Neil Coles	70-74-70-69=283	+3	5,100
7	(Republic of Ireland) Christy O'Connor Snr	76-70-70-68=283	+4	4,340
8	(United States) Arnold Palmer	74-72-70-70=286	+6	3,610
9	(England) Tony Grubb	73-72-70-73=288	+8	3,235
T10	(United States) Doug Dalziel	72-76-71-73=289	+9	2,717
T10	(United States) Larry Mancour	72-68-73-76=289	+9	2,717
T10	(United States) Bert Yancey	75-68-71-75=289	+9	2,717

Preceded by 1989 U.S. Senior Open	Senior Major Championships	Succeeded by 1990 The Tradition at Desert Mountain
