= 1975 Open Championship =

Coordinates: 56.497°N 2.717°W

Tournament information
- Dates: 9–13 July 1975
- Location: Angus, Scotland
- Courses: Carnoustie Golf Links; Championship Course
- Tours: European Tour; PGA Tour

Statistics
- Par: 72
- Length: 7,065 yards (6,460 m)
- Field: 153 players 86 after 1st cut 63 after 2nd cut
- Cut: 149 (+5) (1st cut); 221 (+5) (2nd cut)
- Prize fund: £75,000 $165,000
- Winner's share: £7,500 $16,500

Champion
- (United States) Tom Watson
- 279 (−9), playoff

Location in Scotland
Location in Angus, Scotland

The 1975 Open Championship was the 104th Open Championship, played 9–13 July at Carnoustie Golf Links in Scotland. In his first Open, Tom Watson won an 18-hole playoff by one stroke over Jack Newton to win the first of his eight major titles, which included five Open Championships.

== Final round ==
After three days of calm weather, the wind kicked up during the final round on Saturday and scores went up. Bobby Cole, the leader at 54 holes after back-to-back rounds of 66, shot a four-over 76 and missed the playoff by a stroke. Watson managed an even-par 72, capped with a 20-foot (6 m) birdie putt on the 72nd hole to tie Newton, who shot 74 (+2).

== Playoff ==
The Sunday playoff was back-and-forth in the rain, with the turning point coming at the par 3 8th hole. Both players were at even par and Newton safely on the green as Tom Watson hit 'perhaps the luckiest shot of my career' as he stated on the 'Fore The Good Of The Game' podcast with Bruce Devlin. Tom Watson described (at the 10 min mark) how his tee shot was sailing left after he failed to cut the ball into the wind, when it then hit the out-of-bounds stake and bounced back into play. Tom Watson subsequently drew a decent lie, chipped into the wind and safely onto the green and holed the putt for a par to remain even par with Newton. Later in the playoff and still tied on even par, a chip-in eagle by Watson at the 14th hole, the short par-5 named "Spectacles." Newton had chipped to within inches and tapped in for birdie. The two were tied at the 18th tee, the par-4 "Home" with the meandering Barry Burn. Watson was on the 90th green in two with about 25 feet (8 m) for birdie, but Newton's approach ended in the front left bunker. Newton's lengthy sand shot ran 10 feet (3 m) past the hole. After Watson had safely two-putted for par, Newton's putt to save par and extend the match missed left and Watson won the title.

This was the second and final 18-hole playoff at the Open; the first was in 1970, won by Jack Nicklaus. The format was changed to a four-hole aggregate playoff in 1985, first used in 1989. Prior to 1964, the playoff at the Open was 36 holes.

== Course layout ==
Carnoustie Golf Links – Championship Course

Hole	Name	Yards	Par	Hole	Name	Yards	Par
1	Cup	406	4	10	South America	453	4
2	Gulley	464	4	11	Dyke	372	4
3	Jockie's Burn	348	4	12	Southward Ho	478	5
4	Hillocks	379	4	13	Whins	166	3
5	Brae	397	4	14	Spectacles	488	5
6	Long ^	524	5	15	Lucky Slap	461	4
7	Plantation	397	4	16	Barry Burn	235	3
8	Short	174	3	17	Island	454	4
9	Railway	421	4	18	Home	448	4
Out		3,510	36	In		3,555	36
Source:				Total		7,065	72

^ The 6th hole was renamed Hogan's Alley in 2003

Lengths of the course for previous Opens:

- 1968: 7,252 yards (6,631 m), par 72
- 1953: 7,200 yards (6,585 m), par 72
- 1937: 7,200 yards (6,585 m), par 72
- 1931: 6,701 yards (6,127 m), par 72

== Round summaries ==
=== First round ===
Wednesday, 9 July 1975

Place	Player	Score	To par
1	(England) Peter Oosterhuis	68	−4
T2	(Scotland) David Huish	69	−3
T2	(United States) Hale Irwin	69	−3
T2	(Australia) Jack Newton	69	−3
T2	(United States) Jack Nicklaus	69	−3
T2	(South Africa) Andries Oosthuizen	69	−3
T2	(Australia) Bob Shearer	69	−3
T8	(United States) Danny Edwards	70	−2
T8	(South Africa) Simon Hobday	70	−2
T8	(Northern Ireland) Paul Leonard	70	−2
T8	(United States) Alan Tapie	70	−2

=== Second round ===
Thursday, 10 July 1975

Place	Player	Score	To par
1	(Scotland) David Huish	69-67=136	−8
T2	(South Africa) Bobby Cole	72-66=138	−6
T2	(England) Peter Oosterhuis	68-70=138	−6
T2	(South Africa) Andries Oosthuizen	69-69=138	−6
T2	(United States) Tom Watson	71-67=138	−6
T6	(Scotland) Bernard Gallacher	72-67=139	−5
T6	(United States) Hale Irwin	69-70=139	−5
T6	(Northern Ireland) Paul Leonard	70-69=139	−5
T6	(United States) John Mahaffey	71-68=139	−5
T6	(Australia) Graham Marsh	72-67=139	−5

Amateurs: Stephen (+1), Poxon (+5), Stadler (+5), Price (+10), Levenson (+13).

=== Third round ===
Friday, 11 July 1975

Place	Player	Score	To par
1	(South Africa) Bobby Cole	72-66-66=204	−12
2	(Australia) Jack Newton	69-71-65=205	−11
3	(United States) Johnny Miller	71-69-66=206	−10
4	(United States) Tom Watson	71-67-69=207	−9
T5	(England) Neil Coles	72-69-67=208	−8
T5	(United States) Jack Nicklaus	69-71-68=208	−8
T5	(United States) Hale Irwin	69-70-69=208	−8
T5	(United States) John Mahaffey	71-68-69=208	−8
T5	(South Africa) Andries Oosthuizen	69-69-70=208	−8
T10	(United States) Alan Tapie	70-72-67=209	−7
T10	(England) Peter Oosterhuis	68-70-71=209	−7

Amateurs: Stadler (+7), Stephen (+7), Poxon (+11).

=== Final round ===
Saturday, 12 July 1975

Place	Player	Score	To par	Money (£)
T1	(United States) Tom Watson	71-67-69-72=279	−9	Playoff
T1	(Australia) Jack Newton	69-71-65-74=279	−9	Playoff
T3	(United States) Jack Nicklaus	69-71-68-72=280	−8	3,867
T3	(United States) Johnny Miller	71-69-66-74=280	−8	3,867
T3	(South Africa) Bobby Cole	72-66-66-76=280	−8	3,867
6	(Australia) Graham Marsh	72-67-71-71=281	−7	3,000
T7	(England) Peter Oosterhuis	68-70-71-73=282	−6	2,700
T7	(England) Neil Coles	72-69-67-74=282	−6	2,700
9	(United States) Hale Irwin	69-70-69-75=283	−5	2,400
T10	(United States) George Burns	71-73-69-71=284	−4	2,125
T10	(United States) John Mahaffey	71-68-69-76=284	−4	2,125

=== Playoff ===
Sunday, 13 July 1975

Place	Player	Score	To par	Money (£)
1	(United States) Tom Watson	36-35=71	−1	7,500
2	(Australia) Jack Newton	36-36=72	E	6,000

- The exchange rate at the time was approximately 2.19 dollars (US) per pound sterling.

==== Scorecard ====
Hole	1	2	3	4	5	6	7	8	9	10	11	12	13	14	15	16	17	18
Par	4	4	4	4	4	5	4	3	4	4	4	5	3	5	4	3	4	4
(United States) Watson	E	−1	−1	−1	E	E	E	E	E	E	E	E	E	−2	−2	−1	−1	−1
(Australia) Newton	E	E	+1	+1	+1	E	E	E	E	E	E	−1	E	−1	−1	−1	−1	E
