= 1988 Seniors' British Open =

Tournament information
- Dates: 21–24 July 1988
- Location: South Ayrshire, Scotland, United Kingdom; 55.316°N 4.833°W
- Course: Turnberry (Aisla Course)
- Organised by: The R&A
- Tour: Senior PGA Tour
- Format: 72 holes stroke play

Statistics
- Par: 70
- Length: 6,480 yd (5,930 m)
- Prize fund: £150,000
- Winner's share: £25,000

Champion
- (South Africa) Gary Player
- 272 (−8)
- Location in Europe Location in the United Kingdom Location in Scotland

The 1988 Seniors' British Open, for sponsorship reasons also known as the Volvo Seniors' British Open, was a professional golf tournament for players aged 50 and above and the second Seniors' British Open (later known as the Senior Open Championship), held from 21 to 24 July at Turnberry Golf Resort in South Ayrshire, Scotland, United Kingdom.

In 2018, the tournament was, as all Senior British Open Championships played 1987–2002, retroactively recognized as a senior major golf championship and a PGA Tour Champions (at the time named the Senior PGA Tour) event.

52-year-old Gary Player lead wire-to-wire and won by one stroke ahead of Billy Casper.

It was Player's first Senior Open Championship win and fifth senior major championship. With the win, he became the first golfer to complete the senior grand slam of the time, by adding the title to wins in the U.S. Senior Open, the PGA Seniors' Championship and the Senior Tournament Players Championship. The year after, The Tradition tournament was established and also recognized as a senior major by the PGA Tour Champions.

Defending champion Neil Coles finished tied 6th, after a score of 9-over-par 79 in the fourth round in strong winds, playing in the last group with Player.

A £2,000 bonus prize was awarded to Christy O'Connor Snr, as the leading player over 60 years of age, at tied 9th.

Leading amateur was Colin McLachlan, Scotland.

== Venue ==
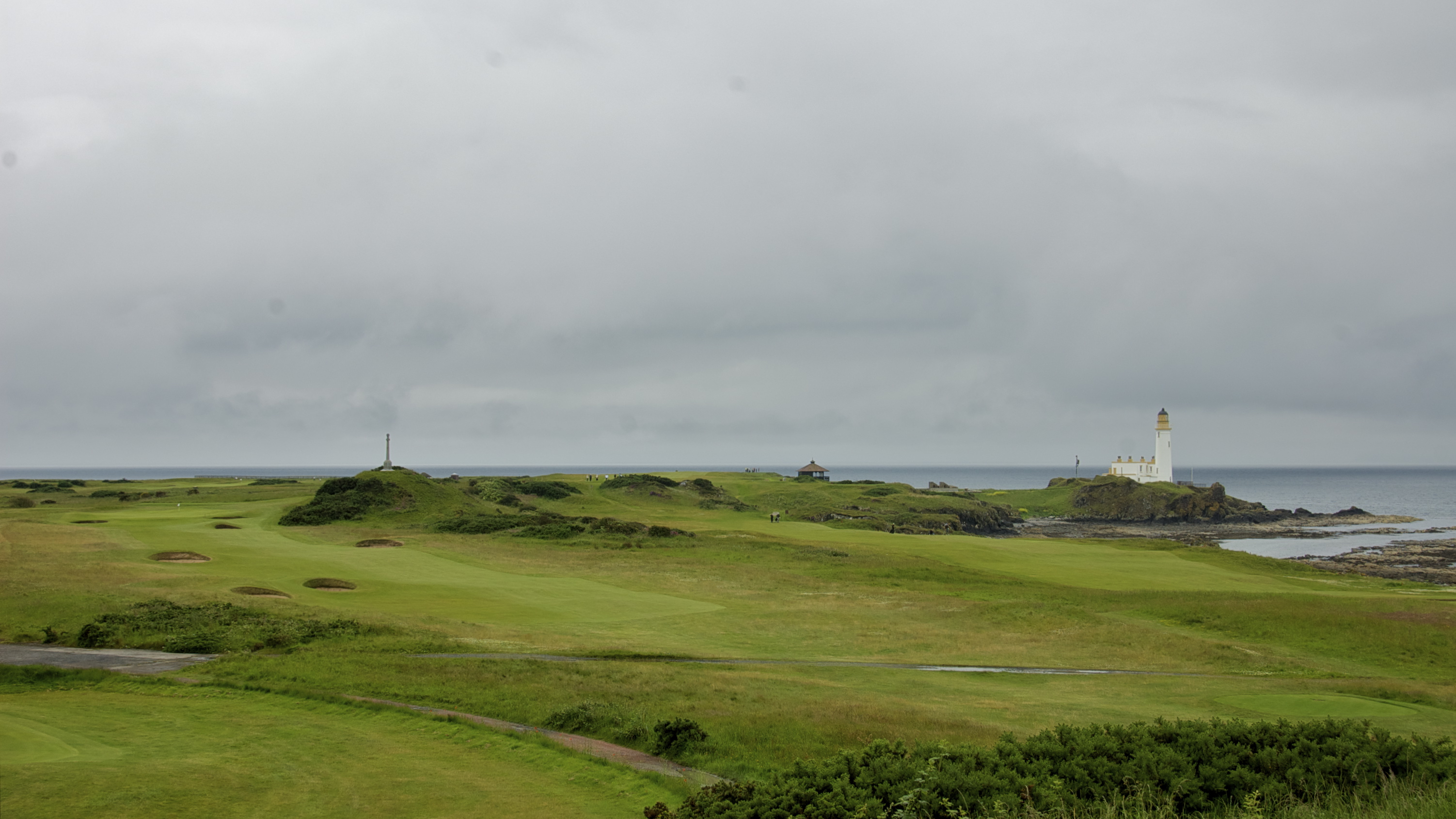
The 10th and 12th holes on the Ailsa course

The Ailsa Course at Turnberry, situated 80 kilometres south of Glasgow, Scotland, on headland along the Firth of Clyde, overlooking the Isle of Arran and Ailsa Craig, was initially opened with 13 holes in 1901, designed by Willie Fernie, and later completed to 18 holes. It was redesigned by Mackenzie Ross between 1949 and 1951.

The championship was the second of four in a row played at Turnberry.

The course had previously hosted The Open Championship twice; 1977 and 1986.

== Field ==
=== Past champion in the field ===
The only past Senior British Open champion, 1987 winner Neil Coles, participated and finished tied 6th.

=== Past winners and runners-up at The Open Championship in the field ===
The field included former winners of The Open Championship; Gary Player (won), Bob Charles (4th) and Arnold Palmer (tied 6th) and former runners-up at The Open Championship; Neil Coles (6th), Christy O'Connor Snr (9th) and Lu Liang-Huan (tied 14th).

== Final results ==
Sunday, 24 July 1988

Place	Player	Score	To par	Money (£)
1	(South Africa) Gary Player	65-66-72-69=272	−8	25,000
2	(United States) Billy Casper	68-65-72-68=273	−7	16,400
3	(South Africa) Harold Henning	70-68-68-68=274	−6	9,150
4	(New Zealand) Bob Charles	70-69-68-70=277	−3	7,350
5	(United States) Jim O'Hern	70-70-68-73=281	+1	6,150
T6	(England) Neil Coles	70-65-69-79=283	+3	4,720
T6	(United States) Arnold Palmer	69-70-73-71=283	+3	4,720
8	(Australia) Bruce Devlin	69-70-76-69=284	+4	3,610
T9	(Republic of Ireland) Christy O'Connor Snr	70-73-71-72=286	+6	3,058
T9	(Scotland) George Will	70-73-73-70=286	+6	3,058

Preceded by 1988 Mazda Senior Tournament Players Championship	Senior Major Championships	Succeeded by 1988 U.S. Senior Open
