= 1974 Open Championship =

Coordinates: 53.7495°N 3.0180°W

Tournament information
- Dates: 10–13 July 1974
- Location: Lancashire, England
- Course: Royal Lytham & St Annes Golf Club
- Tour(s): European Tour; PGA Tour

Statistics
- Par: 71
- Length: 6,822 yards (6,238 m)
- Field: 154 players 81 after 1st cut 60 after 2nd cut
- Cut: 156 (+14) (1st cut); 231 (+18) (2nd cut)
- Prize fund: £50,000 $120,000
- Winner's share: £5,500 $13,200

Champion
- (South Africa) Gary Player
- 282 (−2)

Location in England
Location in Lancashire. England

The 1974 Open Championship was the 103rd Open Championship, held from 10 to 13 July at Royal Lytham & St Annes Golf Club in Lancashire, England. Gary Player won his third Open Championship, four strokes ahead of runner-up Peter Oosterhuis. It was the eighth of his nine major titles and second of the year; he won the Masters in April. In the other two majors in 1974, the U.S. Open and the PGA Championship, Player had top ten finishes.

The use of the larger USGA specification ball (diameter 1.68 in, 42.67 mm) was made compulsory. In previous Opens, players could use the smaller Royal & Ancient specification ball(1.62 in, 41.15 mm). By 1990, the Royal & Ancient changed the UK Rules of Golf to the 1.68 inch ball.

== Course layout ==
| Hole | 1 | 2 | 3 | 4 | 5 | 6 | 7 | 8 | 9 | Out | 10 | 11 | 12 | 13 | 14 | 15 | 16 | 17 | 18 | In | Total |
|---|---|---|---|---|---|---|---|---|---|---|---|---|---|---|---|---|---|---|---|---|---|
| Yards | 206 | 436 | 458 | 393 | 212 | 486 | 551 | 394 | 162 | 3,298 | 334 | 542 | 201 | 339 | 445 | 468 | 356 | 453 | 386 | 3,524 | 6,822 |
| Par | 3 | 4 | 4 | 4 | 3 | 5 | 5 | 4 | 3 | 35 | 4 | 5 | 3 | 4 | 4 | 4 | 4 | 4 | 4 | 36 | 71 |

Previous lengths of the course for The Open Championship (since 1950):

- 1969: 6,848 yards (6,262 m)
- 1963: 6,836 yards (6,251 m)
- 1958: 6,635 yards (6,067 m)
- 1952: 6,657 yards (6,087 m)

== Round summaries ==
=== First round ===
Wednesday, 10 July 1974

| Place | Player | Score | To par |
|---|---|---|---|
| T1 | (England) John Morgan | 69 | −2 |
| T1 | (South Africa) Gary Player | 69 | −2 |
| T3 | (South Africa) Bobby Cole | 70 | −1 |
| T3 | (United States) Danny Edwards | 70 | −1 |
| T5 | (United States) Hubert Green | 71 | E |
| T5 | (Republic of Ireland) John O'Leary | 71 | E |
| T5 | (England) Peter Oosterhuis | 71 | E |
| T8 | (Scotland) David Chillas | 72 | +1 |
| T8 | (England) Neil Coles | 72 | +1 |
| T8 | (Taiwan) Lu Liang-Huan | 72 | +1 |
| T8 | (United States) Johnny Miller | 72 | +1 |
| T8 | (United States) Tom Weiskopf | 72 | +1 |

=== Second round ===
Thursday, 11 July 1974

| Place | Player | Score | To par |
|---|---|---|---|
| 1 | (South Africa) Gary Player | 69-68=137 | −5 |
| T2 | (South Africa) Bobby Cole | 70-72=142 | E |
| T2 | (England) Peter Oosterhuis | 71-71=142 | E |
| 4 | (United States) Danny Edwards | 70-73=143 | +1 |
| T5 | (Taiwan) Lu Liang-Huan | 72-72=144 | +2 |
| T5 | (England) John Morgan | 69-75=144 | +2 |
| T5 | (United States) Tom Weiskopf | 72-72=144 | +2 |
| 8 | (United States) Hubert Green | 71-74=145 | +3 |
| T9 | (United States) Al Geiberger | 76-70=146 | +4 |
| T9 | (England) Noel Hunt | 73-73=146 | +4 |
| T9 | (United States) Jack Nicklaus | 74-72=146 | +4 |

Amateurs: Lyle (+10), James (+16), Clark (+21), Burch (+22), Homer (+23), Shaw (+31).

=== Third round ===
Friday, 12 July 1974

| Place | Player | Score | To par |
|---|---|---|---|
| 1 | (South Africa) Gary Player | 69-68-75=212 | −1 |
| 2 | (England) Peter Oosterhuis | 71-71-73=215 | +2 |
| 3 | (United States) Jack Nicklaus | 74-72-70=216 | +3 |
| 4 | (United States) Hubert Green | 71-74-72=217 | +4 |
| T5 | (South Africa) Bobby Cole | 70-72-76=218 | +5 |
| T5 | (United States) Tom Weiskopf | 72-72-74=218 | +5 |
| T7 | (United States) Danny Edwards | 70-73-76=219 | +6 |
| T7 | (Taiwan) Lu Liang-Huan | 72-72-75=219 | +6 |
| T9 | (United States) Johnny Miller | 72-75-73=220 | +7 |
| T9 | (England) John Morgan | 69-75-76=220 | +7 |

Amateurs: Lyle (+23), James (+24).

=== Final round ===
Saturday, 13 July 1974

| Place | Player | Score | To par | Money (£) |
|---|---|---|---|---|
| 1 | (South Africa) Gary Player | 69-68-75-70=282 | −2 | 5,500 |
| 2 | (England) Peter Oosterhuis | 71-71-73-71=286 | +2 | 4,000 |
| 3 | (United States) Jack Nicklaus | 74-72-70-71=287 | +3 | 3,250 |
| 4 | (United States) Hubert Green | 71-74-72-71=288 | +4 | 2,750 |
| T5 | (United States) Danny Edwards | 70-73-76-73=292 | +8 | 2,300 |
| T5 | (Taiwan) Lu Liang-Huan | 72-72-75-73=292 | +8 | 2,300 |
| T7 | (South Africa) Bobby Cole | 70-72-76-75=293 | +9 | 1,717 |
| T7 | (Belgium) Donald Swaelens | 77-73-74-69=293 | +9 | 1,717 |
| T7 | (United States) Tom Weiskopf | 72-72-74-75=293 | +9 | 1,717 |
| 10 | (United States) Johnny Miller | 72-75-73-74=294 | +10 | 1,500 |

- The exchange rate at the time was approximately 2.39 dollars (US) per pound sterling.
