= 1968 Open Championship =

Coordinates: 56.497°N 2.717°W

Tournament information
- Dates: 10–13 July 1968
- Location: Angus, Scotland
- Course(s): Carnoustie Golf Links; Championship Course

Statistics
- Par: 72
- Length: 7,252 yards (6,631 m)
- Field: 130 players 70 after 1st cut 45 after 2nd cut
- Cut: 155 (+11) (1st cut); 228 (+12) (2nd cut)
- Prize fund: £20,000
- Winner's share: £3,000 $7,200

Champion
- (South Africa) Gary Player
- 289 (+1)

Location in Scotland
Location in Angus, Scotland

The 1968 Open Championship was the 97th Open Championship, played 10–13 July at Carnoustie Golf Links in Angus, Scotland. Gary Player won the second of his three Open titles, two strokes ahead of runners-up Bob Charles and Jack Nicklaus. It was the fifth of Player's nine major titles.

This Open introduced the second cut at 54 holes, used through 1985. In addition, starting with this Championship all past Open champions were exempt from qualifying (though, eventually, an age restriction was placed on past champions).

The inaugural Greater Milwaukee Open was held in the United States during the same week, with a first prize of $40,000, over five times the winner's share of the Open Championship, which was $7,200 (£3,000).

The PGA Championship was played the next week in San Antonio, Texas, the fifth and final time in the 1960s that these two majors were played in consecutive weeks in July. The PGA Championship moved permanently to August in 1969 (except 1971, when it was played in late February) and remained there until 2019, when it moved to May between The Masters and U.S. Open.

== Course ==
Carnoustie Golf Links - Championship Course

Hole	Name	Yards	Par	Hole	Name	Yards	Par
1	Cup	406	4	10	South America	446	4
2	Gulley	468	4	11	Dyke	370	4
3	Jockie's Burn	343	4	12	Southward Ho	473	4
4	Hillocks	429	4	13	Whins	168	3
5	Brae	389	4	14	Spectacles	485	5
6	Long	565	5	15	Lucky Slap	460	4
7	Plantation	386	4	16	Barry Burn	243	3
8	Short	163	3	17	Island	458	4
9	Railway	475	4	18	Home	525	5
Out		3,624	36	In		3,628	36
				Total		7,252	72

== Round summaries ==
=== First round ===
Wednesday, 10 July 1968

Place	Player	Score	To par
T1	(Scotland) Brian Barnes	70	−2
T1	(England) Michael Bonallack (a)	70	−2
T3	(England) Maurice Bembridge	71	−1
T3	(England) Peter Mills	71	−1
T5	(United States) Billy Casper	72	E
T5	(New Zealand) Bob Charles	72	E
T5	(England) Tony Jacklin	72	E
T5	(Republic of Ireland) Paddy Skerritt	72	E
T9	(England) Peter Alliss	73	+1
T9	(Spain) Sebastián Miguel	73	+1
T9	(Scotland) Sandy Wilson	73	+1

=== Second round ===
Thursday, 11 July 1968

Place	Player	Score	To par
1	(United States) Billy Casper	72-68=140	−4
T2	(Scotland) Brian Barnes	70-74=144	E
T2	(New Zealand) Bob Charles	72-72=144	E
T2	(England) Tony Jacklin	72-72=144	E
T5	(United States) Jack Nicklaus	76-69=145	+1
T5	(South Africa) Gary Player	74-71=145	+1
T5	(Republic of Ireland) Paddy Skerritt	72-73=145	+1
T8	(England) Maurice Bembridge	71-75=146	+2
T8	(Wales) Dave Thomas	75-71=146	+2
T10	(Scotland) Harry Bannerman	74-73=147	+3
T10	(England) Michael Bonallack (a)	70-77=147	+3
T10	(United States) Gay Brewer	74-73=147	+3
T10	(Wales) Brian Huggett	76-71=147	+3
T10	(England) Peter Mills	71-76=147	+3

Amateurs: Bonallack (+3), Monguzzi (+8), O'Connor (+12), Sweeny Jr (+12), Shade (+13), Oosterhuis (+16), Saddler (+16).

=== Third round ===
Friday, 13 July 1968

Place	Player	Score	To par
1	(United States) Billy Casper	72-68-74=214	−2
2	(New Zealand) Bob Charles	72-72-71=215	−1
3	(South Africa) Gary Player	74-71-71=216	E
4	(United States) Jack Nicklaus	76-69-73=218	+2
T5	(England) Maurice Bembridge	71-75-73=219	+3
T5	(United States) Gay Brewer	74-73-72=219	+3
T5	(England) Tony Jacklin	72-72-75=219	+3
8	(United States) Arnold Palmer	77-71-72=220	+4
9	(England) Michael Bonallack (a)	70-77-74=221	+5
T10	(England) Neil Coles	75-76-71=222	+6
T10	(Australia) Bruce Devlin	77-73-72=222	+6
T10	(Wales) Brian Huggett	76-71-75=222	+6
T10	(Republic of Ireland) Paddy Skerritt	72-73-77=222	+6

Amateurs: Bonallack (+5), Monguzzi (+18).

=== Final round ===
Saturday, 13 July 1968

Place	Player	Score	To par	Money (£)
1	(South Africa) Gary Player	74-71-71-73=289	+1	3,000
T2	(New Zealand) Bob Charles	72-72-71-76=291	+3	1,738
T2	(United States) Jack Nicklaus	76-69-73-73=291	+3	1,738
4	(United States) Billy Casper	72-68-74-78=292	+4	1,225
5	(England) Maurice Bembridge	71-75-73-74=293	+5	1,000
T6	(Scotland) Brian Barnes	70-74-80-71=295	+7	658
T6	(United States) Gay Brewer	74-73-72-76=295	+7	658
T6	(England) Neil Coles	75-76-71-73=295	+7	658
9	(Canada) Al Balding	74-76-74-72=296	+8	475
T10	(Argentina) Roberto De Vicenzo	77-72-74-74=297	+9	402
T10	(Australia) Bruce Devlin	77-73-72-75=297	+9	402
T10	(United States) Arnold Palmer	77-71-72-77=297	+9	402

Amateurs: Bonallack (+12).
