= 1987 Seniors' British Open =

Tournament information
- Dates: 23–26 July 1987
- Location: South Ayrshire, Scotland; 55.316°N 4.833°W
- Course: Turnberry (Aisla Course)
- Organised by: The R&A
- Tour: Senior PGA Tour
- Format: 72 holes stroke play

Statistics
- Par: 70
- Length: 6,558 yd (5,997 m)
- Field: 87 players, 66 after cut
- Prize fund: £150,000
- Winner's share: £25,000

Champion
- (England) Neil Coles
- 279 (−1)
- Location in Europe Location in the United Kingdom Location in Scotland

The 1987 Seniors' British Open was a professional golf tournament for players aged 50 and above and the first Seniors' British Open (later known as the Senior Open Championship), held from 23 to 26 July at Turnberry Golf Resort in South Ayrshire, Scotland, United Kingdom.

In 2018, the tournament was, as all Senior British Open Championships played 1987–2002, retroactively recognized as a senior major golf championship and a PGA Tour Champions (at the time named the Senior PGA Tour) event.

52-year-old Neil Coles won by one stroke over Bob Charles.

During the opening round of the tournament, the weather was calm and Coles led the field with a 4-under-par score of 66. On the second day, there were strong winds on the course and the lowest score was 72, achieved by two players, Peter Butler and Brian Huggett. On the fourth and final day of competition, it was both blowing strong and raining and the only score under par was made by Bob Charles, with a 3-under-par score of 67.

A £500 bonus prize was awarded to John Panton, as the leading player over 70 years of age.

== Venue ==
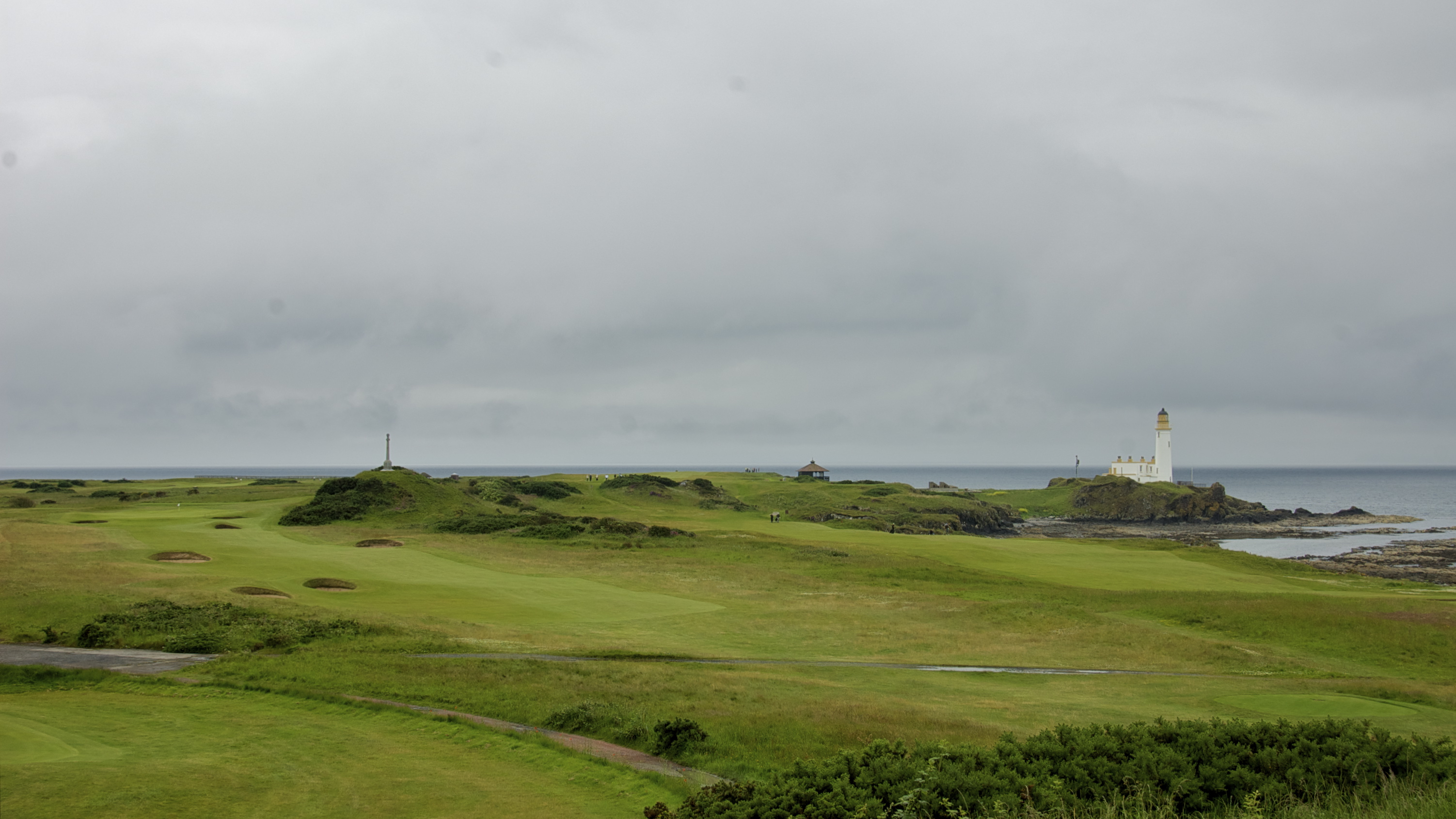
The 10th and 12th holes on the Ailsa course

The Ailsa Course at Turnberry, situated 80 kilometres south of Glasgow, Scotland, on headland along the Firth of Clyde, overlooking the Isle of Arran and Ailsa Craig, was initially opened with 13 holes in 1901, designed by Willie Fernie, and later completed to 18 holes. It was redesigned by Mackenzie Ross between 1949 and 1951.

It was the first of four Senior British Open's in a row played at Turnberry.

The course had previously hosted The Open Championship twice; 1977 and 1986.

The course was shortened nearly 400 yards compared to the set up at the 1986 Open Championship.

== Field ==
87 players entered the competition. 66 of them made the 36-hole cut.

=== Past winners of The Open Championship in the field ===
The field included five former winners of The Open Championship, Bob Charles (2nd), Arnold Palmer (tied 3rd), Gary Player (tied 6th), Peter Thomson (9th) and Kel Nagle.

== Final results ==
Sunday, 26 July 1987

| Place | Player | Score | To par | Money (£) |
|---|---|---|---|---|
| 1 | (England) Neil Coles | 66-73-67-73=279 | −1 | 25,000 |
| 2 | (New Zealand) Bob Charles | 67-74-72-67=280 | E | 16,400 |
| 3 | (United States) Arnold Palmer | 68-73-70-74=285 | +5 | 9,150 |
| 4 | (England) Peter Butler | 73-72-68-73=286 | +6 | 7,350 |
| 5 | (South Africa) Harold Henning | 68-73-78-70=289 | +9 | 6,150 |
| T6 | (South Africa) Gary Player | 69-75-72-75=291 | +11 | 4,720 |
| T6 | (England) Ross Whitehead | 70-78-69-74=291 | +11 | 4,720 |
| 8 | (United States) Rafe Botts | 72-73-76-77=298 | +18 | 3,610 |
| 9 | (Australia) Peter Thomson | 77-73-70-79=299 | +19 | |
| 10 | (Wales) Brian Huggett | 74-72-75-79=300 | +20 | |

| Preceded by 1987 U.S. Senior Open | Senior Major Championships | Succeeded by 1988 General Foods PGA Seniors' Championship |
