= Neil Coles =

English professional golfer (born 1934)

Neil Coles MBE
Personal information
- Full name: Neil Chapman Coles
- Nationality: England
- Born: 26 September 1934 (age 92) London, England
- Height: 5 ft 10 in (1.78 m)
- Weight: 182 lb (83 kg; 13.0 st)
- Spouse: Ann
- Children: Keith, Gary

Career
- Sport: Golf
- Turned professional: 1950
- Former tours: European Tour; European Seniors Tour
- Professional wins: 55

Number of wins by tour
- European Tour: 7
- PGA Tour Champions: 1
- European Senior Tour: 9 (Tied 5th all time)
- Other: 33 (regular); 5 (senior)

Best results in major championships
- Masters Tournament: WD: 1966
- PGA Championship: DNP
- U.S. Open: DNP
- The Open Championship: T2: 1973

Achievements and awards
- World Golf Hall of Fame: 2000 (member page)
- Harry Vardon Trophy: 1963, 1970

Neil Chapman Coles, MBE (born 26 September 1934) is an English professional golfer. Coles had a successful career in European golf, winning 29 important tournaments between 1956 and 1982. After reaching 50, he won a further 14 important Seniors tournaments between 1985 and 2002, winning his final European Seniors Tour event at the age of 67. He also played in eight Ryder Cup matches between 1961 and 1977.

While he never became one of the leading stars of global golf, and did not win a major championship, Coles was remarkable for his consistency, and even more for his durability. He was five times a top-ten finisher in the Open Championship, finishing third in 1961 and second in 1973. In 1982 at the age of 48 he won the Sanyo Open in Spain and held the distinction of being the oldest winner of a European Tour event for nearly 20 years. Even at the peak of his career, he made few appearances in the United States because of his fear of flying.

In his eight Ryder Cup appearances, Coles had 5 wins, 6 defeats and 4 halves in his 15 singles matches; the 7 points he won in these is tied for the most singles points in Ryder Cup history. All his appearances were in a winless period for the Great Britain and Ireland team.

== Early life ==
Coles was born in London, England, and grew up in Letchworth, Hertfordshire. He started out as a junior golfer at Letchworth Golf Club, before becoming an assistant professional there at the age of 16.

== Professional career ==
Coles, then an assistant at Moor Park, was in contention for the 1955 Gor-Ray Cup, the Assistants' Championship, at Hartsbourne. However a poor finish left him in third place, two strokes behind Dave Thomas and Jimmy Hitchcock. In 1956, having moved to Burhill, he won the event, finishing four strokes ahead of Peter Butler. In 1956 he qualified for the Open Championship for the first time, at Hoylake, with rounds of 79 and 70. However rounds of 78 and 82 meant he missed the cut. As a previous winner Coles was unable to play in the 1957 assistants' championship but he was runner-up in the Coombe Hill Assistants' Tournament, a stroke behind George Low. In 1957 Coles became more prominent in major British events. In September he reached the quarter-finals of the News of the World Match Play and was sixth in the Dunlop Masters, despite a poor final round. Coles played in a few PGA Tour events in early 1959, including the Bing Crosby Pro-Am where he finished tied for 28th place. In the 1959 Open Championship at Muirfield Coles qualified in a tie for third place. In the Open itself he finished in a tie for 21st place.

In 1960 Coles moved to Coombe Hill and soon won the Coombe Hill Assistants' Tournament, finishing a stroke ahead of Lionel Platts. In June 1961 Coles had his best finish in an important event, finishing runner-up to Bernard Hunt in the Daks Tournament. Coles finished joint-3rd in the 1961 Open Championship in July. These tournaments were among those that counted towards qualification for the 1961 Ryder Cup, the leading 9 in the Order of Merit after the Carling-Caledonian Tournament in early August gaining a place. Coles was 5th in the table and so qualified for his first Ryder Cup, at Royal Lytham in mid-October. The week before the Ryder Cup was played, Coles won his first major event, the Ballantine Tournament at Wentworth, winning by five strokes from Ken Bousfield. Coles started the final round 7 strokes behind Bousfield but had a final round of 65 to Bousfield's 77. The first prize of £1,500 was more than Arnold Palmer received for winning that year's Open Championship. That year's Ryder Cup was the first played with 18-hole matches; the United States winning by five points. Coles lost both his foursomes matches but halved his morning singles match and beat Dow Finsterwald in the afternoon singles. Coles made his second trip to America to play in some PGA Tour events in California in early 1962. He had his best result in his final event, the 90-hole Palm Springs Golf Classic where he finished tied for 7th place, winning $1,350.

After Coles's win in the 1961 Ballantine Tournament he won a further 10 British and Irish events between 1962 and 1966. Two of these were shared wins, both in 1963. In British tournaments at this time only "championships" required a champion; other events were often left with joint winners who shared the prize money. Coles won the Senior Service Tournament in 1962, which had first prize of £2,000. He won two events in 1963, the Martini International and the Daks Tournament, both joint wins. Coles won the 1963 Harry Vardon Trophy ahead of Bernard Hunt, despite Hunt having a lower stroke average and Hunt winning almost twice as prize money. Coles had 674 points to Hunt's 645. He also led the Ryder Cup points list for the 1963 event in the United States. The British and Ireland team were heavily beaten, Coles getting a win and two halves from his six matches.

Coles won three important events in 1964, the Daks Tournament, the Bowmaker Tournament and the News of the World Match Play. He won nearly twice as much prize money as any other player but only finished fourth in the Order of Merit. He reached the final of the 1964 Piccadilly World Match Play Championship, losing 2&1 to Arnold Palmer and collecting the runners-up prize of £3,000. Coles won two events in 1965, the Carroll's International and the News of the World Match Play, He finished second in the points list for the 1965 Ryder Cup at Royal Birkdale. He played in all six sessions, winning three matches and losing three. He finished the season third in the Order of Merit. Coles played on the American winter circuit in early 1966, finishing with the Masters. He made the cut and was tied for 32nd place after three rounds, but withdrew from the final round after feeling ill. Coles won two more events in 1966, the Pringle of Scotland Tournament and the Dunlop Masters. He only finished fourth in the Order of Merit but set a new prize money record, £8,329, beating his own best of £7,890 from 1964.

After winning 11 important British events between 1961 and 1966, Coles failed to win one from 1967 to 1969. He had some consistent results, including solo runner-up finishes behind Tony Jacklin in the 1967 Dunlop Masters and behind Peter Townsend in the 1968 Piccadilly PGA Close Championship. He qualified for the 1967 Ryder Cup team, finishing third in the points list, and was placed fifth in the list for the 1969 team, to get an automatic place. In the 1967 match in Houston, he lost his three opening pairs matches but beat Doug Sanders twice in the final-day single matches. The 1969 match at Royal Birkdale was tied. Coles beat Tommy Aaron in the morning singles but lost to Dan Sikes in the afternoon.

Coles made a remarkable start to the 1970 season. In March he won the Wentworth Foursomes with Peter Davidson. He then won the Italian BP Open and the Walworth Aloyco Tournament in Italy, before travelling to Spain where he was runner-up in both the Madrid Open and the Spanish Open. Returning to England he was runner-up in the Penfold Tournament in early May, and then in successive weeks he won the Southern Professional Championship, won the Sumrie Better-Ball with Bernard Hunt, was third in the Agfa-Gevaert Tournament and won the Daks Tournament at the end of the month. After recovering from a leg-muscle injury, he won the Bowmaker Tournament at the end of June, and was then tied for 6th in the 1970 Open Championship. Coles won the Harry Vardon Trophy for the second time, having previously won it in 1963. Coles' continued his good form into 1971, winning four tournaments: the Penfold-Bournemouth Tournament, the Daks Tournament, the Carroll's International and the German Open. He led the points list for the 1971 Ryder Cup in St. Louis. He halved his single match with Frank Beard but lost to Jack Nicklaus in the second singles session. He finished second in the 1971 Order of Merit, behind Peter Oosterhuis.

Coles was ranked 7th in the world on the inaugural Mark McCormack's world golf rankings in December 1968, a position he regained at the end of 1970.

=== European Tour ===
Coles was 37 when the European Tour started in 1972. He won seven times on the tour, six times between 1972 and 1978 and then in 1982 at the Sanyo Open in Barcelona. At 48 years and 14 days he became the oldest winner on the tour and remained so until Des Smyth won in 2001 at the age of 48 years and 34 days. Coles also held the record for the number of consecutive cuts made in European Tour events, 56, until that record was passed by Bernhard Langer in the 1990s. He made the cut in every event between the 1973 Viyella PGA Championship and the 1979 Open Championship, when he withdrew with an elbow injury. Coles was in the top-10 of the Order of Merit every year from 1972 to 1979, except 1977 when he was 11th. His highest finish in the Order of Merit was 5th place in 1974.

Coles had his best finish in the Open Championship in 1973, finishing joint runner-up three strokes behind Tom Weiskopf, after a final round of 66. He also had a top-10 finish in 1975 when he was tied for 7th place, despite a final round 74.

Coles qualified in second place for the 1973 Ryder Cup team, his seventh successive Ryder Cup appearance, in which he had never been outside the top 5 in the qualification points list. The match at Muirfield was tied after two day but the United States dominated the two singles sessions. Coles halved his match against Gay Brewer but lost 6&5 to Lee Trevino in the afternoon session. Coles withdrew from consideration for the 1975 Ryder Cup in Pennsylvania, because of his fear of flying and because it was impractical to travel by sea. Coles finished in 15th place in the points list for the 1977 Ryder Cup at Royal Lytham, having missed some events with back trouble. The top 8 in the list were automatic selections and were joined by four further players selected by a committee of three consisting of Coles himself, the team captain Brian Huggett and Brian Barnes. The committee chose Coles as one their four selections. The selection seemed justified when Coles won the Tournament Players Championship the week before the Ryder Cup. The match itself was a disappointment with the United States winning by five points with Coles losing all his three matches.

1977 was Coles' last appearance in the Ryder Cup. In 8 contests he played 40 matches, winning 12, losing 21 and halving 7. However his singles record was better with 5 wins, 6 defeats and 4 halved matches. There were two sets of singles matches from 1961 to 1975 and Coles played in 7 of those matches. His total of 15 singles matches is the most for any Ryder Cup player and the 7 points he won in these matches is still tied for the most singles points won.

Coles continued to play in European Tour events until his mid-50s, having his last top-10 finish, a tie for 6th place, at the 1987 Panasonic European Open at the age of 52. In addition, Coles was, since its inception in the 1980s, until November 2013, the chairman of the PGA European Tour's board of directors, when he was replaced by David Williams. During this era, he was also a golf course architect designing courses such as Chartham Park.

=== Senior career ===
The European Senior Tour started in 1992, when Coles was 57 years old. Before then there were very few professional seniors events in the UK. The PGA Seniors Championship had been played since 1957 and The Senior Open Championship was started in 1987. Coles dominated the PGA Seniors Championship between 1985, when he first played in it, to 1991. He won the events in 1985, two strokes ahead of the 60-year-old Christy O'Connor Snr. He won again in 1986 and for a third time in 1987, when the event was reduced to 54 holes by bad weather. He was tied for third place in 1988 behind Peter Thomson before winning for a fourth time in 1989. In 1990 and 1991 he was the runner-up, behind Brian Waites on both occasions. Coles won the inaugural Senior Open Championship in 1987 at Turnberry, a stroke ahead of Bob Charles. The following year, again at Turnberry. he was just a stroke behind the leader Gary Player after three rounds, but a last round 79 dropped him into a tie for 6th place; Player scoring 69 to win the title. He had further top-10 finishes in the 1989 and 1991. From 1987 to 1991 it was only in the 1990 Seniors' British Open that he failed to get into the top 10.

Coles played on the European Seniors Tour from its start in 1992, making his final appearances in 2007. Although he never won the PGA Seniors Championship or the Senior Open Championship during this period, he did win 9 of the regular 54-hole events between 1992 and 2002. His last win was in the 2002 Lawrence Batley Seniors at the age of 67 years and 276 days, beating his own record for the oldest winner of a European Seniors Tour event, set in 2000. Amongst his high finishes was joint runner-up behind John Fourie in the 1992 Senior British Open. He had a total of 68 top-10 finishes between 1992 and 2004, the last being in the Bovis Lend Lease European Senior Masters three weeks before his 70th birthday. Coles finished in the top ten on the European Seniors Tour's Order of Merit every year from 1992 to 2000, except 1997, his best position being 3rd in 1992. He was 11th in the Order of Merit in 2002.

== Awards and honors ==
In 2000, Coles was inducted into the World Golf Hall of Fame

== Personal life ==
Coles married Ann Keep, after growing up together in Letchworth, Hertfordshire. They had two sons, Keith and Gary. Ann died in 2015. Gary was also a professional golfer and followed his father by winning the PGA Assistants' Championship in 1985, 29 years after his father. He was appointed Member of the Order of the British Empire (MBE) in the 1982 New Year Honours,

== Professional wins (55) ==
=== European Tour wins (7) ===
No.	Date	Tournament	Winning score	Margin of victory	Runner(s)-up
1	1 Jul 1972	Sunbeam Electric Scottish Open	−5 (72-72-70-69=283)	Playoff	(Wales) Brian Huggett
2	14 Apr 1973	Spanish Open	−6 (67-71-72-72=282)	3 strokes	(South Africa) Tienie Britz, (Wales) Craig Defoy
3	26 May 1973	Benson & Hedges Match Play Championship	2 up		(England) Doug McClelland
4	21 Sep 1974	W.D. & H.O. Wills Tournament	−5 (68-69-73-73=283)	1 stroke	(Australia) Jack Newton
5	31 May 1976	Penfold PGA Championship	E (70-69-71-70=280)	Playoff	(Republic of Ireland) Eamonn Darcy, (South Africa) Gary Player
6	10 Sep 1977	Tournament Players Championship	−4 (76-70-73-69=288)	1 stroke	(England) Peter Dawson
7	10 Oct 1982	Sanyo Open	−14 (71-67-64-64=266)	1 stroke	(England) Gary Cullen

European Tour playoff record (2–1)

No.	Year	Tournament	Opponent(s)	Result
1	1972	Sunbeam Electric Scottish Open	(Wales) Brian Huggett	Won with birdie on second extra hole
2	1976	Penfold PGA Championship	(Republic of Ireland) Eamonn Darcy, (South Africa) Gary Player	Won with par on third extra hole Player eliminated by par on first hole
3	1978	Benson & Hedges International Open	(Australia) Noel Ratcliffe, (United States) Lee Trevino	Trevino won with par on fourth extra hole Ratcliffe eliminated by par on first hole

=== Great Britain and Ireland wins (18) ===
Date	Tournament	Winning score	Margin of victory	Runner(s)-up	Ref.
25 May 1956	Gor-Ray Cup	70-71-68-68=277	4 strokes	(England) Peter Butler	
26 May 1960	Coombe Hill Assistants' Tournament	66-70-71-73=280	1 stroke	(England) Lionel Platts	
7 Oct 1961	Ballantine Tournament	71-72-69-65=277	5 strokes	(England) Ken Bousfield	
22 Sep 1962	Senior Service Tournament	70-69-65-73=277	1 stroke	(South Africa) Denis Hutchinson, (Australia) Kel Nagle, (Australia) Peter Thomson	
4 May 1963	Martini International	74-74-71-79=298	Shared title with (Republic of Ireland) Christy O'Connor Snr		
15 Jun 1963	Daks Tournament	75-68-69-68=280	Shared title with (England) Peter Alliss		
6 Jun 1964	Daks Tournament	67-74-73-68=282	1 stroke	(Australia) Peter Thomson	
30 Jun 1964	Bowmaker Tournament	68-68=136	1 stroke	(England) Peter Alliss	
5 Sep 1964	News of the World Match Play	3 & 2		(England) Peter Butler	
18 Jul 1965	Carroll's International	68-67-69-65=269	6 strokes	(England) Tommy Horton, (England) Harry Weetman	
5 Sep 1965	News of the World Match Play	19 holes		(England) Lionel Platts	
25 Jun 1966	Pringle of Scotland Tournament	69-67-69-68=273	3 strokes	(England) Peter Alliss	
17 Sep 1966	Dunlop Masters	70-69-70-69=278	1 stroke	(Republic of Ireland) Christy O'Connor Snr, (Australia) Peter Thomson	
30 May 1970	Daks Tournament	67-70-71-73=281	3 strokes	(England) Peter Wilcock	
30 Jun 1970	Bowmaker Tournament	66-66=132	3 strokes	(England) Jimmy Hitchcock	
8 May 1971	Penfold-Bournemouth Tournament	71-74-69-70=284	4 strokes	(England) Stuart Brown, (Scotland) Gordon Cunningham, (England) Doug Sewell, (Scotland) Ronnie Shade	
5 Jun 1971	Daks Tournament	70-71-70-73=284	Shared title with (Wales) Brian Huggett		
20 Jun 1971	Carroll's International	69-67-72-68=276	3 strokes	(England) Peter Oosterhuis	

=== Continental Europe wins (4) ===
Date	Tournament	Winning score	Margin of victory	Runner(s)-up	Ref.
24 Aug 1963	Engadine Open	276	2 strokes	(South Africa) Stewart Davies, (Egypt) Abdel Halim Kahoul	
29 Mar 1970	Italian BP Open	69-73-72-68=282	3 strokes	(Spain) Valentín Barrios	
6 Apr 1970	Walworth Aloyco Tournament	282	3 strokes	(Republic of Ireland) Christy O'Connor Snr, (Wales) Brian Huggett	
25 Jul 1971	German Open	69-71-71-68=279	4 strokes	(Australia) Peter Thomson	

=== Other wins (11) ===
- 1962 Sunningdale Foursomes (with Ross Whitehead)
- 1963 Wentworth Foursomes (with Keith Warren)
- 1967 Sunningdale Foursomes (with Keith Warren)
- 1969 Carlyon Bay Hotel Tournament
- 1970 Wentworth Foursomes (with Peter Davidson), Southern Professional Championship, Sumrie Better-Ball (with Bernard Hunt), Carlyon Bay Hotel Tournament
- 1971 Carlyon Bay Hotel Tournament
- 1973 Sumrie Better-Ball (with Bernard Hunt)
- 1980 Sunningdale Foursomes (with Doug McClelland)

=== Senior PGA Tour wins (1) ===
Legend
Senior major championships (1)
Other Senior PGA Tour (0)

No.	Date	Tournament	Winning score	Margin of victory	Runner-up
1	26 Jul 1987	Seniors' British Open	−1 (66-73-67-73=279)	1 stroke	(New Zealand) Bob Charles

=== European Seniors Tour wins (9) ===
No.	Date	Tournament	Winning score	Margin of victory	Runner(s)-up
1	4 Oct 1992	Collingtree Homes Seniors Classic	+2 (72-72-74=218)	3 strokes	(South Africa) John Fourie, (Northern Ireland) Hugh Jackson
2	23 May 1993	Gary Player Seniors Classic	E (76-66-71=213)	2 strokes	(Scotland) George Will
3	26 Aug 1995	Collingtree Seniors (2)	−5 (71-72-68=211)	4 strokes	(Scotland) Brian Barnes
4	22 Jun 1997	Ryder Collingtree Seniors Classic (3)	−8 (68-71-69=208)	7 strokes	(Spain) Antonio Garrido, (England) Brian Waites
5	31 May 1998	Philips PFA Golf Classic	−13 (67-69-67=203)	Playoff	(Northern Ireland) David Jones
6	1 Aug 1999	Energis Senior Masters	−11 (68-69-68=205)	1 stroke	(Scotland) David Huish
7	22 Aug 1999	Dalmahoy Scottish Seniors Open	−10 (69-68-69=206)	1 stroke	(United States) Jerry Bruner, (United States) Jay Dolan
8	4 Jun 2000	Microlease Jersey Seniors Open	−9 (66-71-70=207)	3 strokes	(United States) Jerry Bruner
9	29 Jun 2002	Lawrence Batley Seniors	−4 (72-67-70=209)	Playoff	(England) David Creamer, (United States) Steve Stull

European Seniors Tour playoff record (2–2)

No.	Year	Tournament	Opponent(s)	Result
1	1998	Philips PFA Golf Classic	(Northern Ireland) David Jones	Won with birdie on first extra hole
2	1998	Schroder Senior Masters	(Wales) Brian Huggett, (Northern Ireland) Eddie Polland	Huggett won with birdie on first extra hole
3	2000	Lawrence Batley Seniors	(South Africa) John Fourie, (Scotland) David Huish	Huish won with par on first extra hole
4	2002	Lawrence Batley Seniors	(England) David Creamer, (United States) Steve Stull	Won with birdie on fifth extra hole Stull eliminated by par on fourth hole

=== Senior circuit wins (5) ===
Date	Tournament	Winning score	Margin of victory	Runner-up
28 Jul 1985	Trusthouse Forte PGA Seniors Championship	−4 (72-67-70-75=284)	2 strokes	(Republic of Ireland) Christy O'Connor Snr
3 Aug 1986	Trusthouse Forte PGA Seniors Championship	−4 (71-70-67-68=276)	1 stroke	(England) Peter Butler
21 Jun 1987	Trusthouse Forte PGA Seniors Championship	−13 (65-70-71=206)	4 strokes	(Australia) Peter Thomson
26 Jul 1987	Seniors' British Open	−1 (66-73-67-73=279)	1 stroke	(New Zealand) Bob Charles
18 Jun 1989	Trusthouse Forte PGA Seniors Championship	+1 (71-66-72-68=277)	4 strokes	(England) Peter Butler

=== Other senior wins (1) ===
- 1991 Léman International Senior Trophy

== Results in major championships ==
Tournament	1956	1957	1958	1959
Masters Tournament				
The Open Championship	CUT	CUT		T21

Tournament	1960	1961	1962	1963	1964	1965	1966	1967	1968	1969
Masters Tournament							WD			
The Open Championship	CUT	T3		T20	CUT	T12	CUT	T36	T6	T11

Tournament	1970	1971	1972	1973	1974	1975	1976	1977	1978	1979
Masters Tournament										
The Open Championship	T6	T22	CUT	T2	T13	T7	T28	T41	T48	WD

Tournament	1980	1981	1982	1983	1984	1985
Masters Tournament						
The Open Championship	T29	T39	T42	CUT	CUT	CUT

Top 10
Did not play

CUT = missed the half-way cut (3rd round cut in 1972, 1983 and 1984 Open Championships)
WD = Withdrew
"T" indicates a tie for a place
Note: Coles never played in the U.S. Open or the PGA Championship.

=== Summary ===
Tournament	Wins	2nd	3rd	Top-5	Top-10	Top-25	Events	Cuts made
Masters Tournament	0	0	0	0	0	0	1	1
U.S. Open	0	0	0	0	0	0	0	0
The Open Championship	0	1	1	2	5	11	28	18
PGA Championship	0	0	0	0	0	0	0	0
Totals	0	1	1	2	5	11	29	19

- Most consecutive cuts made – 6 (1973 Open Championship – 1978 Open Championship)

== Senior major championships ==
=== Wins (1) ===
Year	Championship	Winning score	Margin	Runner-up
1987	Seniors' British Open	−1 (66-73-67-73=279)	1 stroke	(New Zealand) Bob Charles

== Team appearances ==
- Ryder Cup (representing Great Britain and Ireland): 1961, 1963, 1965, 1967, 1969 (tie), 1971, 1973, 1977
- World Cup (representing England): 1963, 1968
- R.T.V. International Trophy (representing England): 1967 (winners)
- Double Diamond International (representing England): 1971 (winners), 1973, 1975 (playing captain), 1976 (winners), 1977
- Marlboro Nations' Cup/Philip Morris International (representing England): 1973, 1975
- Sotogrande Match/Hennessy Cognac Cup (representing Great Britain and Ireland): 1974 (winners), 1976 (winners), 1978 (winners), 1980 (winners)
- Praia d'El Rey European Cup (representing the European Seniors Tour): 1998 (tie), 1999

== See also ==
- List of golfers with most European Senior Tour wins
