= 2012 Senior Open Championship =

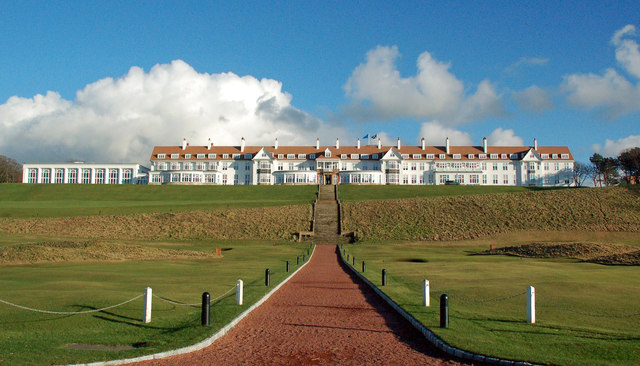
- Turnberry Golf Resort

Tournament information
- Dates: 26–29 July 2012
- Location: South Ayrshire, Scotland; 55.316°N 4.833°W
- Course: Turnberry Golf Resort (Ailsa Course)
- Organised by: The R&A
- Tours: European Senior Tour; Champions Tour
- Format: 72 holes stroke play

Statistics
- Par: 70
- Length: 7,106 yards (6,498 m)
- Field: 144 players, 76 after cut
- Cut: 148 (+8)
- Prize fund: US$2,000,000
- Winner's share: US$315,600

Champion
- (United States) Fred Couples
- 271 (−9)

Location map
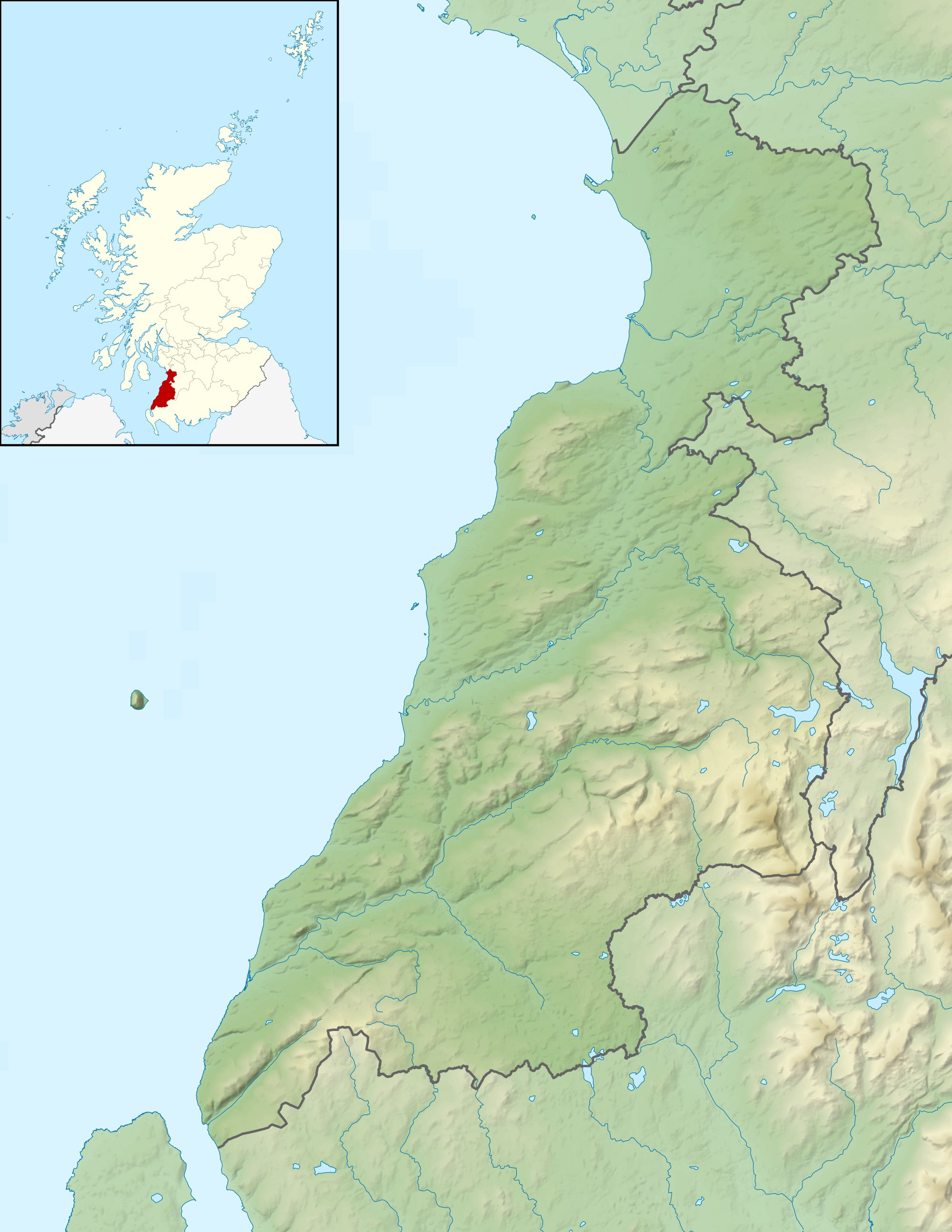
- Location in Europe Location in the British Isles Location in Scotland Location in South Ayrshire

The 2012 Senior Open Championship was a senior major golf championship and the 26th Senior Open Championship, held on 26–29 July at Turnberry Golf Resort in South Ayrshire, Scotland, United Kingdom. It was the 10th Senior Open Championship played as a senior major championship.

Fred Couples won two strokes ahead of Gary Hallberg. It was the second senior major championship victory for Couples.

== Venue ==
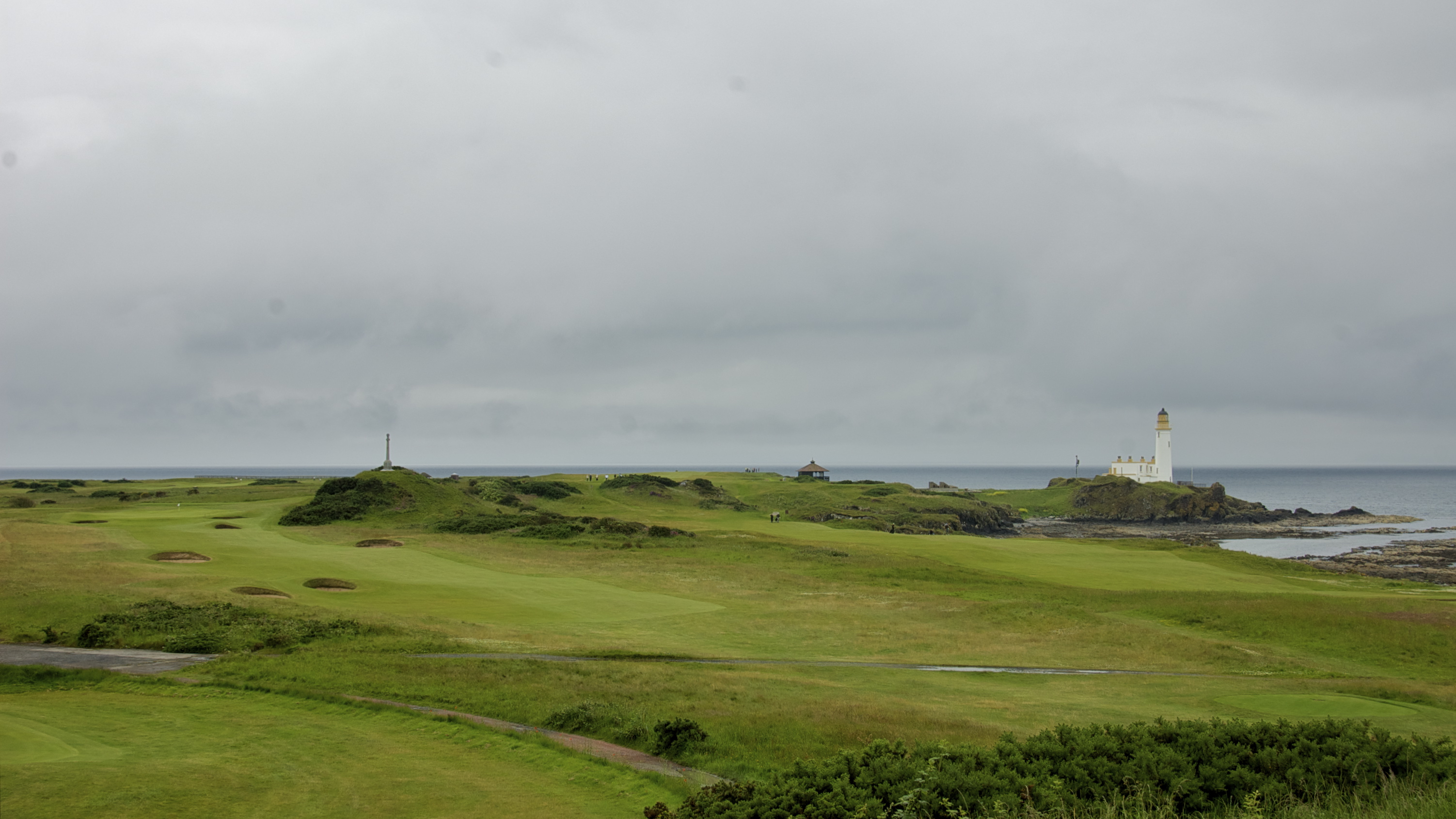
The 10th and 12th holes on the Ailsa course

The Ailsa Course at Turnberry, situated 80 kilometres south of Glasgow, Scotland, on headland along the Firth of Clyde, overlooking the Isle of Arran and Ailsa Craig, was initially opened with 13 holes in 1901, designed by Willie Fernie, and later completed to 18 holes. It was redesigned by Mackenzie Ross between 1949 and 1951.

It was the seventh Senior Open Championship played at Turnberry. The course had previously hosted The Open Championship four times; 1977, 1986, 1994 and 2009.

=== Card of the course ===
Ailsa Course

Hole	Name	Yards	Par	Hole	Name	Yards	Par
1	Ailsa Craig	354	4	10	Dinna Fouter	457	4
2	Mak Siccar	428	4	11	Maidens	175	3
3	Blaw Wearie	462	4	12	Monument	447	4
4	Woe-Be-Tide	168	3	13	Tickly Tap	410	4
5	Fin Me Oot	479	4	14	Risk-An-Hope	454	4
6	Tappie Toorie	231	3	15	Ca' Canny	206	3
7	Roon The Ben	538	5	16	Wee Burn	422	4
8	Goat Fell	454	4	17	Lang Whang	533	5
9	Bruce's Castle	458	4	18	Duel in the Sun	430	4
Out		3,572	35	In		3,534	35
Source:				Total		7,106	70

== Field ==
The field consisted of 144 competitors; 141 professionals and three amateurs.

18-hole stroke play qualifying rounds were held on Monday, 23 July, on three places in Scotland, for players who were not already exempt. The 28 leading players from the qualifying competitions joined the 116 exempt players for the championship.

The 76 players who made the 36-hole cut included 74 professionals and two amateurs. Chip Lutz finished leading amateur at tied 36th.

=== Past champions in the field ===
Six past Senior Open champions participated. Three of them made the 36-hole cut; 2010 champion Bernhard Langer (tied 6th), 2003, 2005 and 2007 champion Tom Watson (tied 10th), 2006 and 2009 champion Loren Roberts (tied 27th). 2008 champion Bruce Vaughan, 2004 champion Pete Oakley and 2002 champion Noboru Sugai did not make the cut.

2011 champion Russ Cochran did not compete to defend his title, due to a back injury. 1988, 1990 and 1997 champion Gary Player withdraw prior to the first round due to a neck injury.

=== Past winners and runners-up at The Open Championship in the field ===
The field included six former winners of The Open Championship. Three of them made the cut; 1989 Open champion Mark Calcavecchia (tied 10th), 1996 Open champion Tom Lehman (tied 10th) and 1975, 1977, 1980, 1982 and 1983 Open champion Tom Watson (tied 10th). 1986 and 1993 Open champion Greg Norman, 1985 Open champion Sandy Lyle and 1969 Open champion Tony Jacklin did not make the cut.

The field also included nine former runners-up at The Open Championship; John Cook (tied 6th), Bernhard Langer (tied 6th), Mark McNulty (tied 18th) Tom Kite (tied 24th), Gordon J. Brand (missed cut), Mike Harwood (missed cut), Costantino Rocca (missed cut). Rodger Davis (missed cut) and Wayne Grady (missed cut).

== Final results ==
Sunday, 29 July 2012

Place	Player	Score	To par	Money ($)
1	(United States) Fred Couples	72-68-64-67=271	−9	315,600
2	(United States) Gary Hallberg	71-63-73-66=273	−7	210,500
T3	(England) Barry Lane	67-74-66-69=276	−4	97,813
T3	(England) Carl Mason	69-74-67-66=276	−4	97,813
T3	(United States) Dick Mast	66-73-70-67=276	−4	97,813
T6	(United States) John Cook	69-72-66-71=278	−2	53,205
T6	(Australia) Peter Fowler	68-72-65-73=278	−2	53,205
T6	(Germany) Bernhard Langer	64-73-66-75=278	−2	53,205
T6	(United States) Mark Wiebe	70-71-70-67=278	−2	53,205
T10	(United States) Jay Don Blake	66-73-69-71=279	−1	32,904
T10	(United States) Mark Calcavecchia	72-72-69-66=279	−1	32,904
T10	(United States) Tom Lehman	66-71-73-69=279	−1	32,904
T10	(United States) Tom Watson	69-75-66-69=279	−1	32,904
T10	(Wales) Ian Woosnam	71-70-68-70=279	−1	32,904

Preceded by 2012 U.S. Senior Open	Senior Major Championships	Succeeded by 2013 Senior PGA Championship
