= 2015 Senior Open Championship =

Tournament information
- Dates: 23–26 July 2015
- Location: Sunningdale, England; 51.38°N 0.63°W
- Courses: Sunningdale Golf Club, Old Course
- Organised by: The R&A
- Tours: European Senior Tour; Champions Tour
- Format: 72 holes stroke play

Statistics
- Par: 70
- Length: 6,617 yards (6,051 m)
- Field: 144 players, 83 after cut
- Cut: 143 (+3)
- Prize fund: US$2,100,000
- Winner's share: US$319,090

Champion
- (United States) Marco Dawson
- 264 (−16)

Location map
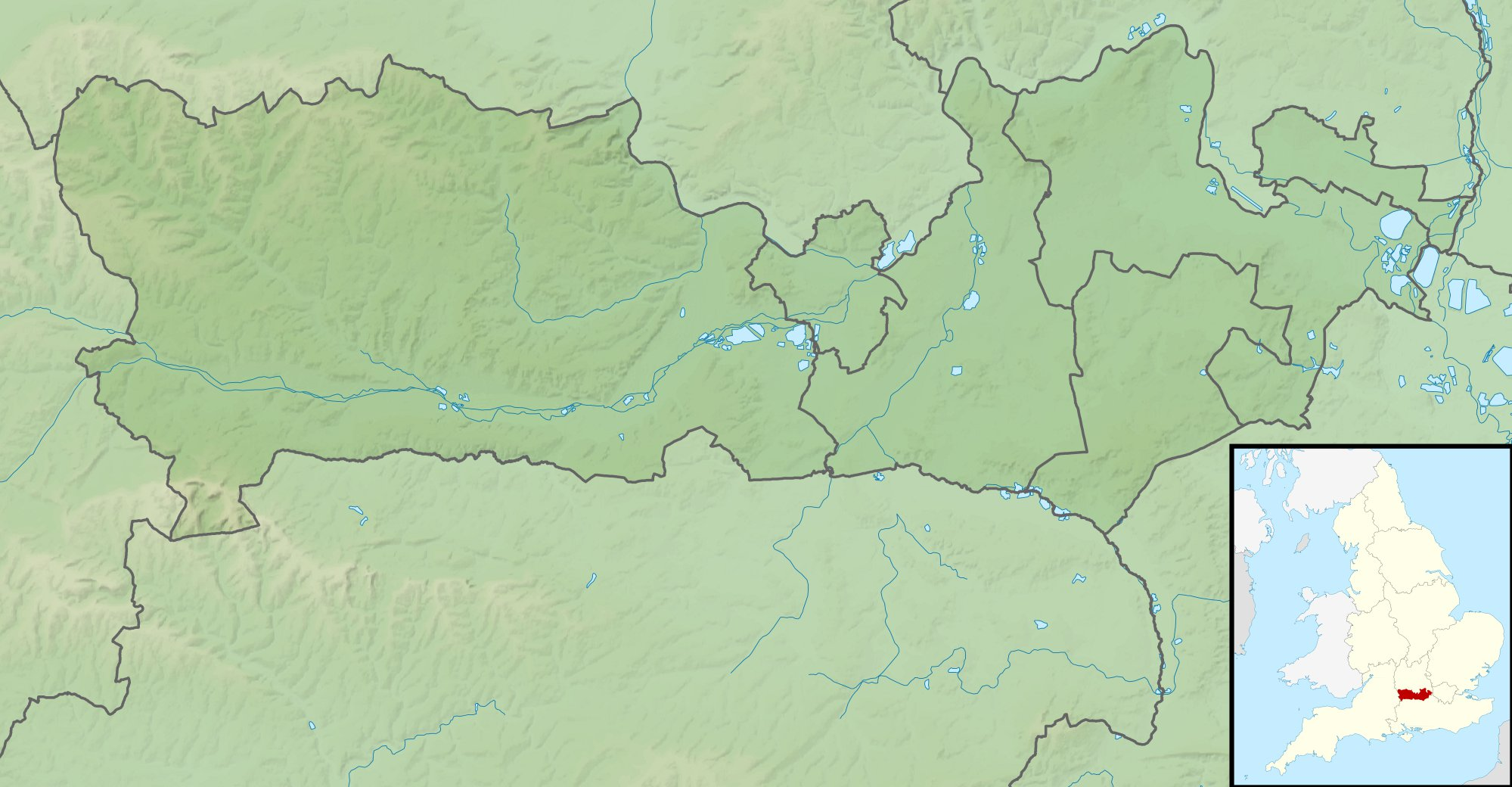
- Location in the United Kingdom Location in England Location in Berkshire

The 2015 Senior Open Championship was a senior major golf championship and the 29th Senior Open Championship, held on 22–25 July at Sunningdale Golf Club in Sunningdale, England. It was the second Senior Open Championship played at the course and the 13th Senior Open Championship played as a senior major championship.

Marco Dawson won by one stroke over Bernhard Langer. It was Dawson's first senior major championship victory.

== Venue ==
The 2015 event was the second Senior Open Championship played at Sunningdale Golf Club. It took place at the club's Old Course, designed by The Open Championship winner Willie Park Jr. and opened in 1901.

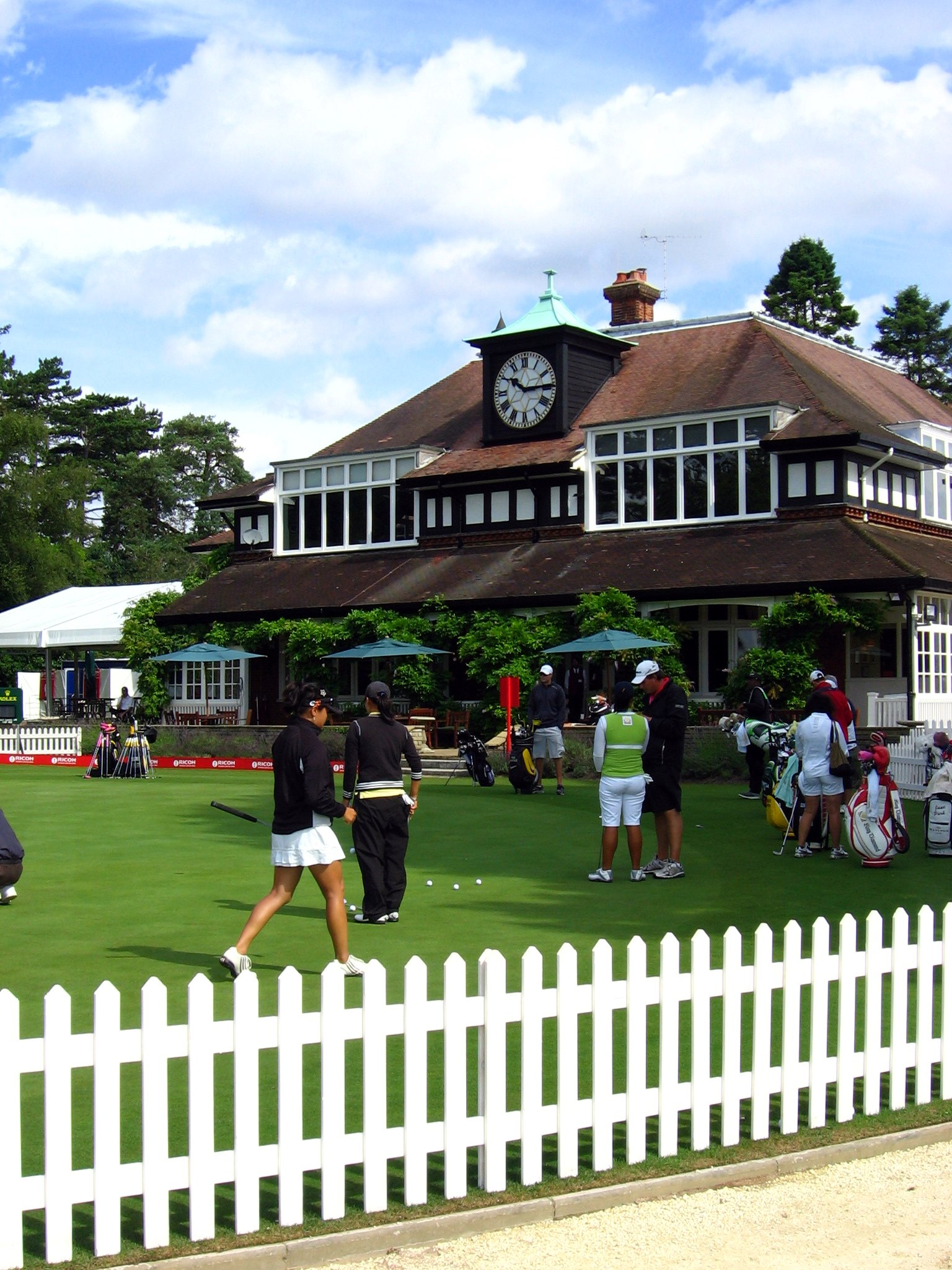
Sunningdale GC clubhouse

== Field ==
The field consisted of 144 professional and amateur competitors.

An 18-hole stroke play qualifying round was held on Monday, 18 July, for players who were not already exempt. Players from the qualifying competition joined the exempt players for the championship.

83 players, all of them professionals and no amateurs, made the 36-hole cut. Two of them withdraw.

=== Past champions in the field ===
Seven past Senior Open champions participated. Five of them made the 36-hole cut; 2010 and 2014 champion Bernhard Langer (2nd), 2012 champion Fred Couples (tied 5th), 2003, 2005 and 2007 champion Tom Watson (tied 15th) and 2011 champion Russ Cochran (tied 31st). 2006 and 2009 champion Loren Roberts and 2002 champion Noboru Sugai did not make the cut.

=== Past winners of The Open Championship in the field ===
The field included six former winners of The Open Championship. Five of them made the cut; 1975, 1977, 1980, 1982 and 1983 Open champion Tom Watson (tied 15th), 1996 Open champion Tom Lehman (tied 22nd), 1989 Open champion Mark Calcavecchia (tied 51st), 1985 Open champion Sandy Lyle (tied 51st) and 1998 Open champion Mark O'Meara (withdraw after the second round). 1987, 1990 and 1992 Open champion Nick Faldo missed the cut.

=== Course layout ===
Hole	Yards	Par	Hole	Yards	Par
1	492	5	10	488	4
2	489	4	11	322	4
3	318	4	12	442	4
4	156	3	13	180	3
5	419	4	14	503	5
6	433	4	15	222	3
7	406	4	16	434	4
8	192	3	17	425	4
9	273	4	18	423	4
Out	3,178	35	In	3,439	35
Source:		Total		6,617	70

== Final results ==
Sunday, 26 July 2015

Place	Player	Score	To par	Money ($)
1	(United States) Marco Dawson	65-67-68-64=264	−16	319,090
2	(Germany) Bernhard Langer	65-68-68-64=265	−15	212,779
3	(Scotland) Colin Montgomerie	67-67-66-67=267	−13	119,766
4	(Spain) Miguel Ángel Jiménez	65-69-68-67=269	−11	95,735
T5	(United States) Woody Austin	69-67-70-66=272	−8	74,076
T5	(United States) Fred Couples	68-66-69-69=272	−8	74,076
T7	(United States) Jeff Maggert	71-67-66-69=273	−7	52,611
T7	(Republic of Ireland) Philip Walton	71-67-65-70=273	−7	52,611
T9	(Australia) Peter Fowler	69-65-68-72=274	−6	38,786
T9	(United States) Jeff Sluman	65-69-70-70=274	−6	38,786
T9	(Mexico) Esteban Toledo	73-68-68-65=274	−6	38,786

Preceded by 2015 U.S. Senior Open	Senior Major Championships	Succeeded by 2016 Regions Tradition
