= 2011 Senior Open Championship =

Tournament information
- Dates: 21–24 July 2011
- Location: Surrey, England; 51.278°N 0.244°W
- Course: Walton Heath Golf Club (Old Course)
- Organised by: The R&A
- Tours: European Senior Tour; Champions Tour
- Format: 72 holes stroke play

Statistics
- Par: 72
- Length: 7,394 yards (6,761 m)
- Field: 144 players, 75 after cut
- Cut: 148 (+6)
- Prize fund: US$2,000,000
- Winner's share: US$315,600

Champion
- (United States) Russ Cochran
- 276 (−12)
- Location in Europe Location in the British Isles Location in England Location in Surrey

The 2011 Senior Open Championship was a senior major golf championship and the 25th Senior Open Championship, held on 21–24 July at Walton Heath Golf Club in Walton on the Hill, Surrey, England, United Kingdom. It was the 9th Senior Open Championship played as a senior major championship.

Russ Cochran won two strokes ahead of Mark Calcavecchia. It was Cochran's first senior major championship victory. Defending champion Bernhard Langer finished tied 12th, eight strokes behind the winner.

== Venue ==
The Walton Heath Golf Club, founded in 1903 and situated in Walton-on-the-Hill, Surrey, England, southwest of London, had previously hosted the 1981 Ryder Cup. Its Old Course was designed by Herbert Fowler.

It was the first Senior Open Championship played at Walton Heath.

=== Course layout ===
Hole	Yards	Par	Hole	Yards	Par
1	435	4	10	396	4
2	519	5	11	529	5
3	437	4	12	451	4
4	427	4	13	465	4
5	183	3	14	470	4
6	558	5	15	408	4
7	400	4	16	475	4
8	442	4	17	206	3
9	189	3	18	404	4
Out	3,590	36	In	3,804	36
		Total		7,394	72

== Field ==
The field of 144 competitors included 141 professionals and three amateurs.

18-hole stroke play qualifying rounds were held on three venues on Monday, 18 July, for players who were not already exempt. The leading players from the qualifying competition joined the exempt players for the championship.

75 players made the 36-hole cut, 73 professionals and two amateurs. Randy Haag finished leading amateur at tied 39th.

=== Past champions in the field ===
Four past Senior Open champions participated. Two of them made the 36-hole cut; 2003, 2005 and 2007 champion Tom Watson (tied 3rd) and 2010 champion Bernhard Langer (tied 12th). 2004 champion Pete Oakley, 2008 champion Bruce Vaughan and 2002 champion Noboru Sugai did not make the cut.

=== Past winners and runners-up at The Open Championship in the field ===
The field included six former winners of The Open Championship. Four of them made the cut; 1989 Open champion Mark Calcavecchia (2nd), 1975, 1977, 1980, 1982 and 1983 Open champion Tom Watson (tied 3rd), 1996 Open champion Tom Lehman (tied 21st) and 1998 Open champion Mark O'Meara (tied 39th).1985 Open champion Sandy Lyle did not make the cut. 1994 Open champion Nick Price withdraw.

The field also included eight former runners-up at The Open Championship; John Cook (11th), Bernhard Langer (tied 12th), Mike Harwood (tied 23rd), Mark McNulty (tied 44th) Tom Kite (tied 49th), Gordon J. Brand (69th) and Costantino Rocca (tied 54th). Rodger Davis missed the cut.

== Final results ==
Sunday, 24 July 2012

Place	Player	Score	To par	Money ($)
1	(United States) Russ Cochran	72-70-67-67=276	−12	315,600
2	(United States) Mark Calcavecchia	68-69-72-69=278	−10	210,500
T3	(United States) Corey Pavin	72-69-69-69=279	−9	106,600
T3	(United States) Tom Watson	75-68-69-67=279	−9	106,600
5	(England) Barry Lane	71-70-69-70=280	−8	80,240
6	(South Africa) David Frost	69-74-66-72=281	−7	66,280
T7	(Australia) Peter Fowler	71-68-73-70=282	−6	46,090
T7	(United States) Fred Funk	72-70-74-66=282	−6	46,090
T7	(United States) Mike Goodes	70-70-71-71=282	−6	46,090
T7	(United States) Lee Rinker	70-67-74-71=282	−6	46,090

Preceded by 2011 Senior PGA Championship	Senior Major Championships	Succeeded by 2011 U.S. Senior Open
