= 1990 Seniors' British Open =

Tournament information
- Dates: 26–29 July 1990
- Location: South Ayrshire, Scotland, United Kingdom; 55.316°N 4.833°W
- Course: Turnberry (Aisla Course)
- Organised by: The R&A
- Tour: Senior PGA Tour
- Format: 72 holes stroke play

Statistics
- Par: 70
- Length: 6,480 yd (5,930 m)
- Prize fund: £150,000
- Winner's share: £25,000

Champion
- (South Africa) Gary Player
- 280 (E)
- Location in Europe Location in the United Kingdom Location in Scotland

The 1990 Seniors' British Open, for sponsorship reasons also known as the Volvo Seniors' British Open, was a professional golf tournament for players aged 50 and above and the fourth Seniors' British Open (later known as the Senior Open Championship), held from 26 to 29 July at Turnberry Golf Resort in South Ayrshire, Scotland, United Kingdom.

In 2018, the tournament was, as all Senior British Open Championships played 1987–2002, retroactively recognized as a senior major golf championship and a PGA Tour Champions (at the time named the Senior PGA Tour) event.

54-year-old Gary Player won his second Senior British Open title and eighth senior major championship. He became the first golfer with multiple titles in both The Open Championship and the Senior British Open Championship.

== Venue ==
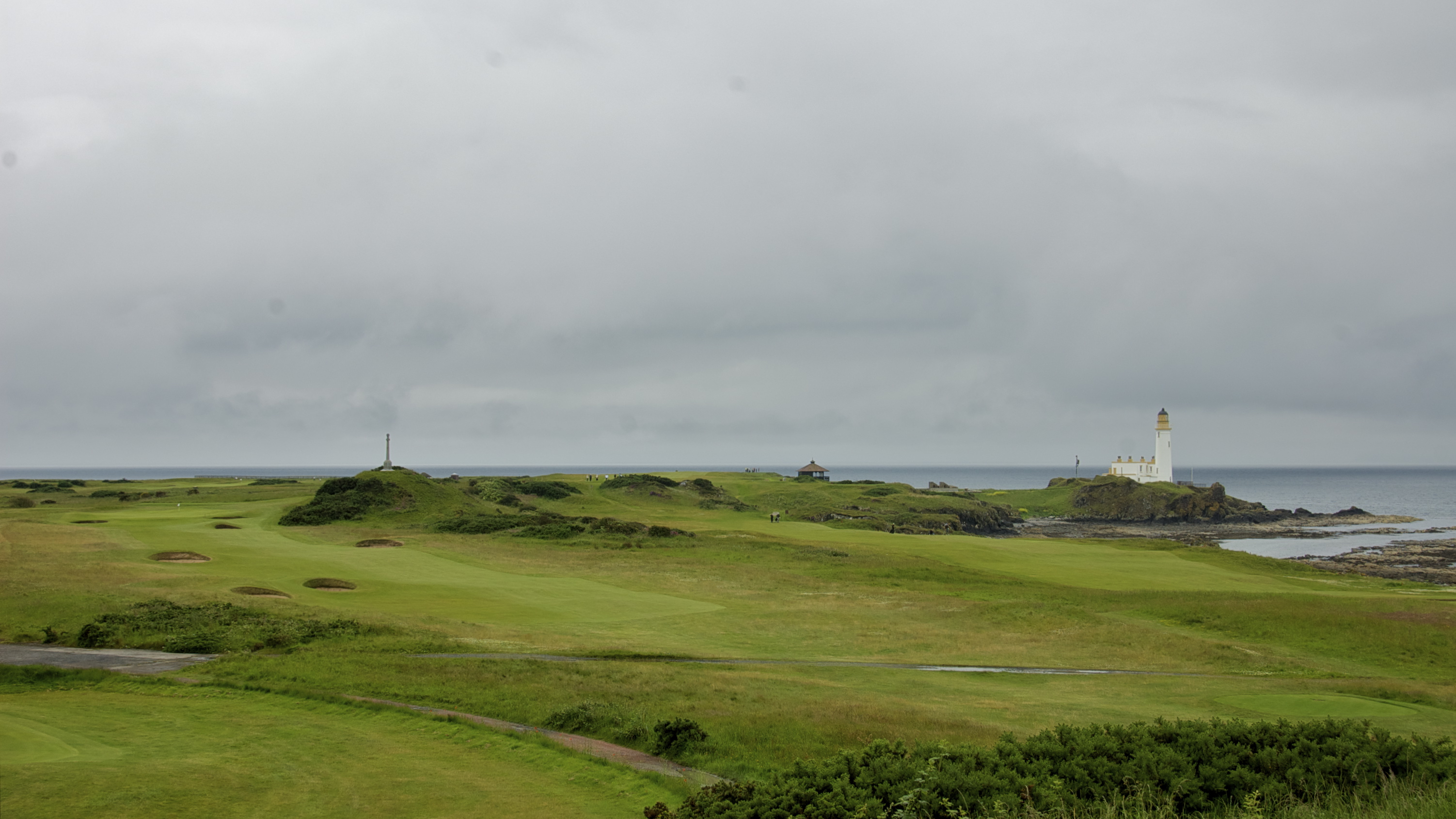
The 10th and 12th holes on the Ailsa course

The Ailsa Course at Turnberry, situated 80 kilometres south of Glasgow, Scotland, on headland along the Firth of Clyde, overlooking the Isle of Arran and Ailsa Craig, was initially opened with 13 holes in 1901, designed by Willie Fernie, and later completed to 18 holes. It was redesigned by Mackenzie Ross between 1949 and 1951.

The championship was the fourth in a row played at Turnberry.

The course had previously hosted The Open Championship twice; 1977 and 1986.

== Field ==
=== Past winners of The Open Championship in the field ===
The field included former winners of The Open Championship; Gary Player (won), Arnold Palmer (4th) and Bob Charles (tied 6th).

== Final results ==
Sunday, 29 July 1990

The fourth and last round was played in rain and strong winds. Deane Beman lost a 3-shot-lead after finishing six over par on the last four holes, including missing an eight-foot-putt on the last hole and came one shot short of forcing a playoff.

Gary Player won one stroke ahead of Deane Beman and Brian Waites. Defending champion Bob Charles finished tied 6th.

| Place | Player | Score | To par | Money (£) |
|---|---|---|---|---|
| 1 | (South Africa) Gary Player | 69-65-71-75=280 | E | 25,000 |
| T2 | (United States) Deane Beman | 67-66-67-81=281 | +1 | 12,825 |
| T2 | (England) Brian Waites | 66-70-69-76=281 | +1 | 12,825 |
| 4 | (United States) Arnold Palmer | 66-68-69-79=282 | +2 | 7,350 |
| 5 | (South Africa) Simon Hobday | 67-70-67-79=283 | +3 | 6,150 |
| T6 | (United States) Billy Casper | 70-70-70-74=284 | +4 | 4,720 |
| T6 | (New Zealand) Bob Charles | 68-67-73-76=284 | +4 | 4,720 |
| T8 | (South Africa) Harold Henning | 72-75-62-76=285 | +5 | 3,423 |
| T8 | (United States) Deray Simon | 71-68-66-80=285 | +5 | 3,423 |
| T10 | (United States) Larry Mowry | 70-66-71-79=286 | +6 | |
| T10 | (South Africa) John Fourie | 68-72-69-77=286 | +6 | |

| Preceded by 1990 U.S. Senior Open | Senior Major Championships | Succeeded by 1991 The Tradition at Desert Mountain |
