= 2008 Senior Open Championship =

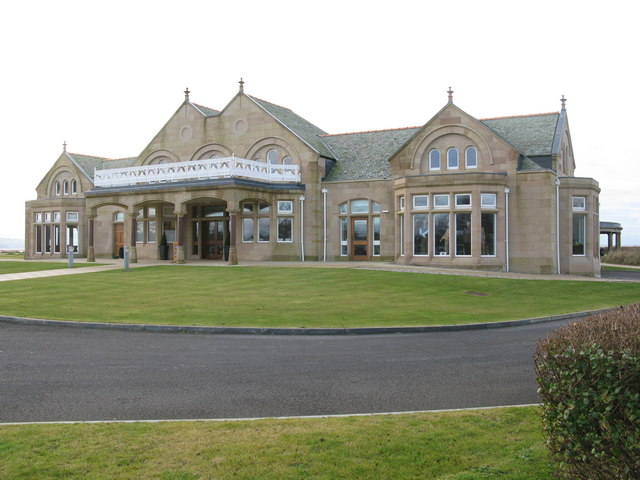
- Royal Troon Golf Club; The Old Course clubhouse

Tournament information
- Dates: 24–27 July 2008
- Location: Troon, South Ayrshire, Scotland, United Kingdom; 55.532°N 4.651°W
- Courses: Royal Troon Golf Club, Old Course
- Organized by: The R&A
- Tours: European Senior Tour; PGA Tour Champions

Statistics
- Par: 71
- Length: 7,058 yards (6,454 m)
- Field: 144 players, 71 after cut
- Cut: 152 (+10)
- Prize fund: US$2,000,000; Winners share US$315,600

Champion
- (United States) Bruce Vaughan
- 278 (−6)

Location map
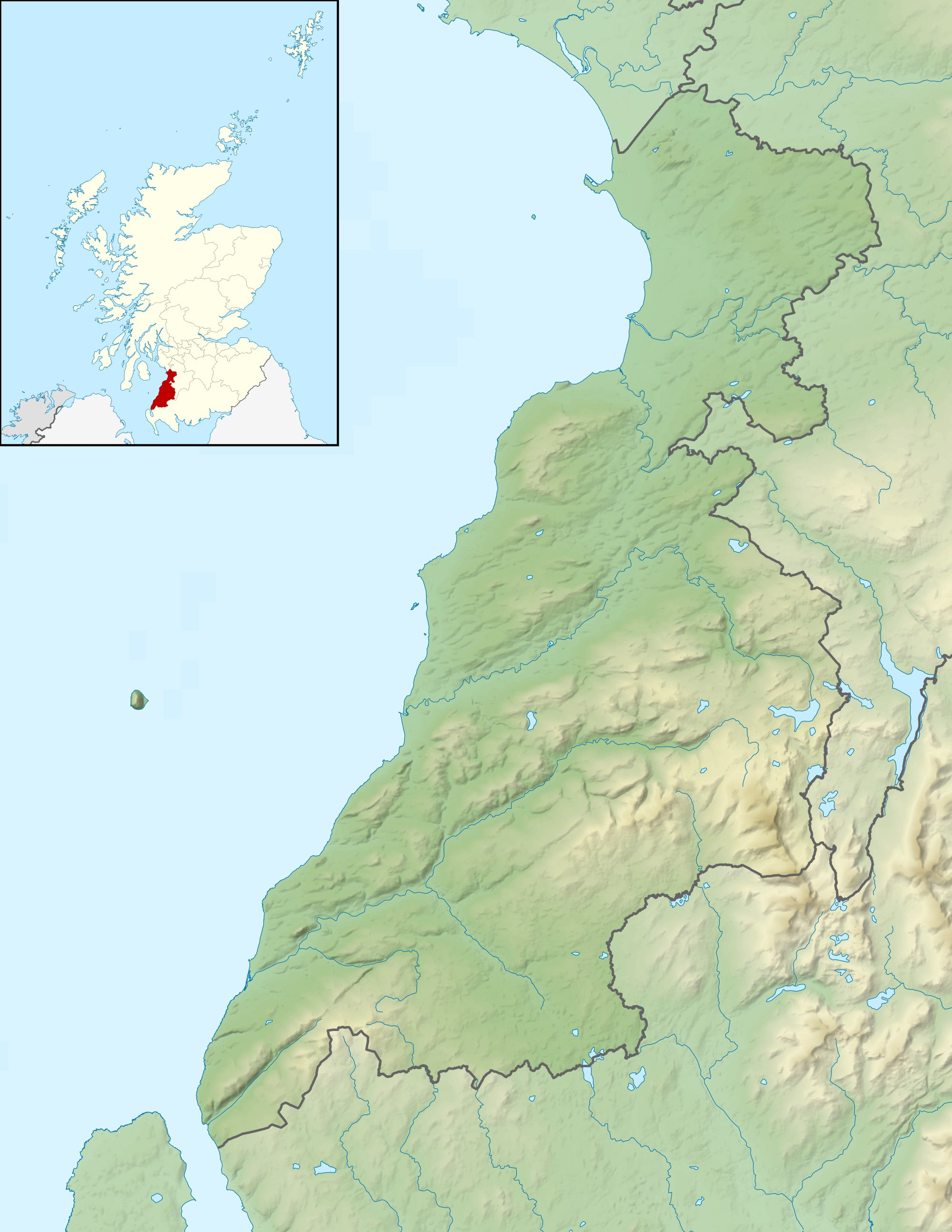
- Location in Europe Location in the British Isles Location in Scotland Location in South Ayrshire

The 2008 Senior Open Championship was a senior major golf championship and the 22nd Senior Open Championship, held on 24–27 July at Royal Troon Golf Club in South Ayrshire, Scotland. It was the first Senior Open Championship played at the course and the seventh Senior Open Championship played as a senior major championship.

Bruce Vaughan won after a playoff over John Cook. It was Vaughan's first senior major championship victory.

== Venue ==
The event was the first Senior Open Championship played at Royal Troon Golf Club, taking place at the club's Old Course, designed by Willie Fernie and George Strath. The club was founded in 1878 and had previously hosted The Open Championship eight times.

=== Course layout ===
Hole	Name	Yards	Par	Hole	Name	Yards	Par
1	Seal	361	4	10	Sandhills	437	4
2	Black Rock	390	4	11	The Railway	470	4
3	Gyaws	378	4	12	The Fox	431	4
4	Dunure	558	5	13	Burmah	470	4
5	Greenan	210	3	14	Alton	178	3
6	Turnberry	575	5	15	Crosbie	445	4
7	Tel-el-Kebir	402	4	16	Well	541	5
8	Postage Stamp	122	3	17	Rabbit	210	3
9	The Monk	423	4	18	Craigend	457	4
Out		3,419	36	In		3,639	35
				Total		7,058	71

== Field ==
The field consisted of 144 competitors; 130 professionals and 14 amateurs.

18-hole stroke play qualifying rounds were held on Monday, 21 July, on three places in Scotland, Dundonald Links Golf Club, Western Gailes Golf Club and Glasgow Gailes Golf Club, for players who were not already exempt. The leading players from the qualifying competitions joined the exempt players for the championship.

71 players made the 36-hole cut, all of them professionals and no amateurs.

=== Past champions in the field ===
Four past Senior Open champions participated. Two of them made the 36-hole cut; 2003, 2005 and 2007 champion Tom Watson (tied 5th) and 2004 champion Pete Oakley (tied 68th). 1989 and 1993 champion Bob Charles and 1988, 1990 and 1997 champion Gary Player did not make the cut.

=== Past winners and runners-up at The Open Championship in the field ===
The field included six former winners of The Open Championship. Three of them made the cut; 1986 and 1993 Open champion Greg Norman (tied 5th), 1975, 1977, 1980, 1982 and 1983 Open champion Tom Watson (tied 5th) and 1998 Open champion Mark O'Meara (tied 34th). 1985 Open champion Sandy Lyle, 1963 Open champion Bob Charles and 1959, 1968 and 1974 Open champion Gary Player did not make the cut.

The field also included ten former runners-up at The Open Championship; John Cook (2nd), Bernhard Langer (4th), Costantino Rocca (tied 8th), Andy Bean (tied 10th), Tom Kite (tied 16th), Mark McNulty (tied 16th), Wayne Grady (tied 27th), Ben Crenshaw (43rd), Gordon J. Brand (missed cut) and Simon Owen (missed cut).

== Final round and playoff summaries ==
=== Final round ===
Sunday, 27 July 2009

John Cook and Bruce Vaughan tied the lead after the fourth round, to meet in a sudden death playoff, to decide the winner.

Place	Player	Score	To par	Money ($)
T1	(United States) John Cook	69-71-67-71=278	−6	Playoff
T1	(United States) Bruce Vaughan	68-71-69-70=278	−6	Playoff
3	(Argentina) Eduardo Romero	68-73-68-70=279	−5	118,500
4	(Germany) Bernhard Langer	70-71-71-68=280	−4	94,700
T5	(United States) Gene Jones	70-76-68-68=282	−2	67,773
T5	(Australia) Greg Norman	75-72-67-68=282	−2	67,773
T5	(United States) Tom Watson	70-71-71-70=282	−2	67,773
T8	(United States) Phil Blackmar	74-72-71-68=285	+1	44,870
T8	(Italy) Costantino Rocca	73-73-72-67=285	+1	44,870
10	(United States) Andy Bean	69-75-73-69=285	+2	37,820

=== Playoff ===
Sunday, 27 July 2009

The sudden-death playoff went on the 18th hole until one of the players had a lower score on the hole than the other. Bruce Vaughan beat John Cook with a birdie at the first extra hole. Vaughan rolled in a 15 feet putt after hitting a 5-iron into the green.

Place	Player	Score	To par	Money ($)
1	(United States) Bruce Vaughan	3	−1	315,600
2	(United States) John Cook	4	E	210,500

Preceded by 2008 Senior PGA Championship	Senior Major Championships	Succeeded by 2008 U.S. Senior Open
