= 1991 Seniors' British Open =

1991 Senior British Open
Tournament information
- Dates: 11–14 July 1991
- Location: Lytham St Annes, England, United Kingdom; 53.7496°N 3.0178°W
- Course: Royal Lytham & St Annes Golf Club
- Organised by: The R&A
- Tour: Senior PGA Tour
- Format: 72 holes stroke play

Statistics
- Par: 71
- Length: 6,673 yards (6,102 m)
- Prize fund: £150,000 €210,000
- Winner's share: £25,000

Champion
- (South Africa) Bobby Verwey
- 285 (+1)
- Location in Europe Location in the United Kingdom Location in England Location in the Borough of Fylde Location in Lytham St Annes

The 1991 Seniors' British Open was a professional golf tournament for players aged 50 and above and the fifth Senior British Open, held from 11 to 14 July at Royal Lytham & St Annes Golf Club in Lytham St Annes, Lancashire, England, United Kingdom.

In 2018, the tournament was, as all Senior British Open Championships played 1987–2002, retroactively recognized as a senior major golf championship and a PGA Tour Champions (at the time named the Senior PGA Tour) event.

50-year-old Bobby Verwey won his first Seniors' British Open and first senior major championship.

== Venue ==
The event was the first Senior Open Championship of four in a row held at Royal Lytham & St Annes Golf Club.

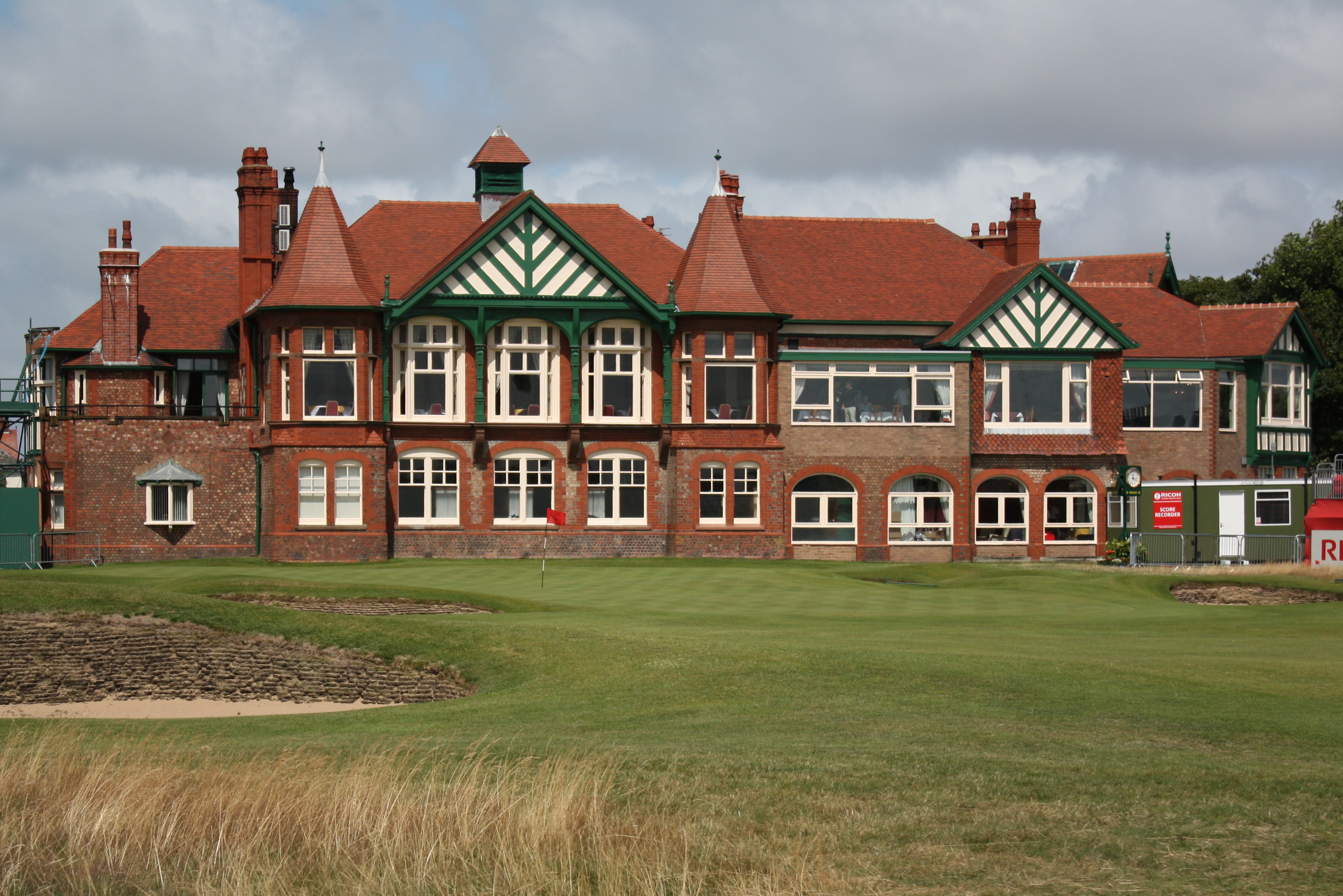
Royal Lytham & St Annes GC clubhouse

There were windy weather conditions on the course during the tournament.

== Field ==
=== Past champions in the field ===
All three past Senior British Open champions participated. All of them made the 36-hole cut, 1989 champion Bob Charles (tied 2nd), 1988 and 1990 champion Gary Player (tied 5th) and 1987 champion Neil Coles (tied 7th),

== Final results ==
Sunday, 14 July 1991

Bobby Verwey led by one stroke going in to the last round, ahead of defending champion Gary Player and English home players Peter Butler and Tommy Horton. On the last hole of the last round, Verwey drove into a fairway bunker and played out safe to put his third shot on the green. He sank an 8-foot putt for a par 4 and a 1-under-par final round of 70. With his 72-hole-score one over par, he beat Bob Charles, who finished with 67, and Horton by one stroke.

Place	Player	Score	To par	Money (£)
1	(South Africa) Bobby Verwey	70-74-71-70=285	+1	25,000
T2	(New Zealand) Bob Charles	69-76-74-67=286	+2	12,775
T2	(England) Tommy Horton	69-76-71-70=286	+2	12,775
4	(Scotland) Charlie Green (a)	72-75-72-70=289	+5	–
T5	(England) David Butler	75-75-70-72=292	+8	9,825
T5	(South Africa) Gary Player	70-73-73-74=290	+8	9,825
T7	(England) Neil Coles	73-75-73-72=293	+9	4,071
T7	(England) Hedley Muscroft	74-73-75-71=293	+9	4,071
T7	(United States) Art Proctor	72-76-72-73=293	+9	4,071
T7	(England) Brian Waites	73-74-72-74=293	+9	4,071

(a) denotes amateur, who did not receive any prize money

Preceded by 1991 Mazda Presents The Senior Players Championship	Senior Major Championships	Succeeded by 1991 U.S. Senior Open
