= 2002 Senior British Open =

Tournament information
- Dates: 25–28 July 2002
- Location: Newcastle, County Down, Northern Ireland; 54.218°N 5.884°W
- Course: Royal County Down Golf Club
- Organised by: The R&A
- Tours: European Senior Tour; PGA Tour Champions
- Format: 72 holes stroke play

Statistics
- Par: 71
- Length: 6,629 yd (6,062 m)
- Field: 132 players, 62 after cut
- Cut: 151 (+9)
- Prize fund: US$1,620,600 €736,715
- Winner's share: €122,786

Champion
- (Japan) Noboru Sugai
- 281 (−3)
- Location in Europe Location in British Isles Location in Ireland Location in Northern Ireland

The 2002 Senior British Open, for sponsorship reasons named Senior British Open presented by MasterCard, was a professional golf tournament for players aged 50 and above and the 16th British Senior Open Championship, held from 25 to 28 July at Royal County Down Golf Club in Newcastle, County Down, Northern Ireland, United Kingdom.

In 2018, the tournament was, as were all Senior British Open Championships played 1987–2002, retroactively recognized as a senior major golf championship and a PGA Tour Champions (at the time named the Senior PGA Tour) event.

Noboru Sugai won by two strokes over John Irwin to win his first Senior British Open title and first senior major championship victory. Sugau became the first winner of the Senior British Open to lead after every round since Gary Player in 1988.

== Venue ==
The hosting course, one of the oldest on the island of Ireland, originally designed by Old Tom Morris and located in naturally links settings in the Murlough Nature Reserve, stretching along the shores of Dundrum Bay, was established in 1889.

The course had previously hosted the 2000 and 2001 Senior British Open Championship and several editions of the Irish Open, The Amateur Championship and the British Ladies Amateur Golf Championship and the 1968 Curtis Cup.

=== Course layout ===
Hole	Yards	Par	Hole	Yards	Par
1	522	5	10	197	3
2	371	4	11	384	4
3	454	4	12	479	5
4	194	3	13	421	4
5	416	4	14	202	3
6	369	4	15	449	4
7	144	3	16	276	4
8	424	4	17	375	4
9	424	4	18	528	5
Out	3,318	35	In	3,311	36
Source:		Total		6,629	71

== Field ==
The field consisted of 132 competitors: 126 professionals and six amateurs.

18-hole stroke play qualifying rounds were held on Tuesday, 23 July, on two places in Ireland, Kilkeel Golf Club and Spa Golf Club, for players who were not already exempt. The leading players from the qualifying competitions joined the exempt players for the championship.

62 players made the 36-hole cut, 61 professionals and one amateur. Arthur Pierce, Ireland, finished leading amateur at tied 52nd.

=== Past champions in the field ===
Six past Senior Open champions participated. All of them made the 36-hole cut; 1999 and 2000 champion Christy O'Connor Jnr (3rd), 1989 and 1993 champion Bob Charles (tied 14th). 1987 champion Neil Coles, (tied 18th), 1991 champion Bobby Verway (tied 25th), 2001 champion Ian Stanley (tied 31st) and 1992 champion John Fourie (tied 43rd).

=== Past winners and runners-up at The Open Championship in the field ===
The field included three former winners of The Open Championship. Two of them made the cut; 1963 Open champion Bob Charles (tied 14th) and 1975, 1977, 1980, 1982 and 1983 Open champion Tom Watson (tied 14th). 1969 Open champion Tony Jacklin did not make the cut.

The field also included two former runners-up at The Open Championship; Neil Coles (tied 18th) and Simon Owen (missed the cut).

== Final results ==
Sunday, 28 July 2002

Place	Player	Score	To par	Money (€)
1	(Japan) Noboru Sugai	67-67-73-74=281	−3	122,785.80
2	(Canada) John Irwin	71-68-74-70=283	−1	78,023.35
3	(Republic of Ireland) Christy O'Connor Jnr	73-70-73-70=286	+2	45,384.10
4	(Scotland) John Chillas	69-69-77-72=287	+3	36,835.73
T5	(Japan) Seiji Ebihara	72-71-77-69=289	+5	27,562.03
T5	(Japan) Katsunari Takahashi	71-69-77-72=289	+5	27,562.03
T5	(New Zealand) Barry Vivian	71-72-78-68=289	+5	27,562.03
T8	(England) Nick Job	76-67-75-72=290	+6	22,342.34
T8	(Scotland) John McTear	71-78-71-70=290	+6	22,342.34
10	(South Africa) John Bland	71-70-73-77=291	+7	19,428.13

Preceded by 2002 Ford Senior Players Championship	Senior Major Championships	Succeeded by 2003 Senior PGA Championship
