= Senior Open Championship =

Professional golf tournament

ISPS Handa Senior Open

Tournament information
- Location: Various in United Kingdom
- Established: 1987
- Course: Various in United Kingdom
- Organised by: The R&A and PGA European Tour
- Tours: European Senior Tour; PGA Tour Champions
- Format: Stroke play
- Prize fund: US$2,850,000 (2025)
- Month played: July

Tournament record score
- Aggregate: 263 Tom Watson (2003)
- To par: −18 Bernhard Langer (2014)

Current champion
- (United States) Jerry Kelly

The Senior Open Championship, or simply The Senior Open (and originally known as the Senior British Open), is a professional golf tournament for players aged 50 and over. It is jointly owned and run by The R&A, the same body that organises The Open Championship, and the PGA European Tour. Prize money won in the event is official money on both PGA Tour Champions (formerly the Senior PGA Tour and Champions Tour) and the European Senior Tour. The purse, which is fixed in United States dollars, had increased to $2.75 million for 2023.

== History ==
The tournament was first held in 1987 and became part of the European Seniors Tour schedule in 1992. It is younger than the PGA Seniors Championship, which started in 1957, as well as the U.S. Senior Open and the Senior PGA Championship. In late 2002 it was designated as the fifth major championship on the Champions Tour schedule. Winners before 2003 were not retroactively designated as Champions Tour major winners until late 2018. Winners gain entry into the following season's Open Championship. The event is usually held the week following The Open Championship, although in 1991 it was held the week before the Open and in 1998 it was held in August, three weeks after the Open.

The 2018 Senior Open was held at St Andrews for the first time, a decision which was heavily influenced by five-time Open champion Tom Watson. In 2020, the championship was cancelled due to the COVID-19 pandemic.

== Field ==
The standard field size is 144 players and an 18-hole qualifying round is held at the championship course on the Monday before the tournament, with a minimum of 24 places available. If fewer than 120 exempt players enter, the field is filled to 144 with more high finishers from qualifying. If more than 120 exempt players enter, the top 24 finishers earn entry even if it causes the field to expand beyond 144.

== Winners ==
| Year | Winner | Score | To par | Margin of victory | Runner(s)-up | Venue |
ISPS Handa Senior Open
| 2026 | (United States) Jerry Kelly | 270 | −10 | 2 strokes | (South Africa) Darren Fichardt (United States) Matt Gogel (Australia) Cameron Percy | Gleneagles (King's) |
| 2025 | (Republic of Ireland) Pádraig Harrington | 264 | −16 | 3 strokes | (Denmark) Thomas Bjørn (United States) Justin Leonard | Sunningdale (Old) |
The Senior Open Championship
| 2024 | (South Korea) K. J. Choi | 278 | −10 | 2 strokes | (Australia) Richard Green | Carnoustie (Championship) |
| 2023 | (Germany) Alex Čejka | 289 | +5 | Playoff (Note: Čejka beat Harrington with a birdie at the second extra hole.) | (Republic of Ireland) Pádraig Harrington | Royal Porthcawl |
| 2022 | (Northern Ireland) Darren Clarke | 270 | −10 | 1 stroke | (Republic of Ireland) Pádraig Harrington | Gleneagles (King's) |
| 2021 | (Wales) Stephen Dodd | 267 | −13 | 1 stroke | (Spain) Miguel Ángel Jiménez | Sunningdale (Old) |
| 2020 | Cancelled due to the COVID-19 pandemic | | | | | |
| 2019 | (Germany) Bernhard Langer (4) | 274 | −6 | 2 strokes | (England) Paul Broadhurst | Royal Lytham & St. Annes |
| 2018 | (Spain) Miguel Ángel Jiménez | 276 | −12 | 1 stroke | (Germany) Bernhard Langer | St Andrews (Old) |
| 2017 | (Germany) Bernhard Langer (3) | 280 | −4 | 3 strokes | (United States) Corey Pavin | Royal Porthcawl |
| 2016 | (England) Paul Broadhurst | 277 | −11 | 2 strokes | (United States) Scott McCarron | Carnoustie (Championship) |
| 2015 | (United States) Marco Dawson | 264 | −16 | 1 stroke | (Germany) Bernhard Langer | Sunningdale (Old) |
| 2014 | (Germany) Bernhard Langer (2) | 266 | −18 | 13 strokes | (Scotland) Colin Montgomerie | Royal Porthcawl |
| 2013 | (United States) Mark Wiebe | 271 | −9 | Playoff (Note: Wiebe beat Langer with a par at the fifth extra hole. Play was suspended because of darkness after two holes of the playoff and the pair returned on Monday morning to complete it.) | (Germany) Bernhard Langer | Royal Birkdale |
| 2012 | (United States) Fred Couples | 271 | −9 | 2 strokes | (United States) Gary Hallberg | Turnberry (Ailsa) |
| 2011 | (United States) Russ Cochran | 276 | −12 | 2 strokes | (United States) Mark Calcavecchia | Walton Heath (Old) |
| 2010 | (Germany) Bernhard Langer | 279 | −5 | 1 stroke | (United States) Corey Pavin | Carnoustie (Championship) |
| 2009 | (United States) Loren Roberts (2) | 268 | −12 | Playoff (Note: Roberts beat McNulty with a par at the third extra hole. Funk was eliminated at the first extra hole where Roberts and McNulty had birdies.) | (United States) Fred Funk (Republic of Ireland) Mark McNulty | Sunningdale (Old) |
| 2008 | (United States) Bruce Vaughan | 278 | −6 | Playoff (Note: Vaughan beat Cook with a birdie at the first extra hole.) | (United States) John Cook | Royal Troon (Old) |
| 2007 | (United States) Tom Watson (3) | 284 | E | 1 stroke | (Australia) Stewart Ginn (United States) Mark O'Meara | Muirfield |
The Senior British Open Championship
| 2006 | (United States) Loren Roberts | 274 | −6 | Playoff (Note: Roberts beat Romero with a par at the first extra hole.) | (Argentina) Eduardo Romero | Turnberry (Ailsa) |
| 2005 | (United States) Tom Watson (2) | 280 | −4 | Playoff (Note: Watson beat Smyth with a par at the third extra hole.) | (Republic of Ireland) Des Smyth | Royal Aberdeen (Balgownie) |
| 2004 | (United States) Pete Oakley | 284 | −4 | 1 stroke | (United States) Tom Kite (Argentina) Eduardo Romero | Royal Portrush (Dunluce) |
Senior British Open
| 2003 | (United States) Tom Watson | 263 | −17 | Playoff (Note: Watson beat Mason with a par at the second extra hole.) | (England) Carl Mason | Turnberry (Ailsa) |
| 2002 | (Japan) Noboru Sugai | 281 | −3 | 2 strokes | (Canada) John Irwin | Royal County Down (Championship) |
| 2001 | (Australia) Ian Stanley | 278 | −6 | Playoff (Note: Stanley beat Charles with a par at the first extra hole.) | (New Zealand) Bob Charles | Royal County Down (Championship) |
| 2000 | (Republic of Ireland) Christy O'Connor Jnr (2) | 275 | −9 | 2 strokes | (South Africa) John Bland | Royal County Down (Championship) |
| 1999 | (Republic of Ireland) Christy O'Connor Jnr | 282 | −6 | 3 strokes | (South Africa) John Bland | Royal Portrush (Dunluce) |
| 1998 | (Wales) Brian Huggett | 283 | −5 | Playoff (Note: Huggett beat Polland with a par at the first extra hole.) | (Northern Ireland) Eddie Polland | Royal Portrush (Dunluce) |
| 1997 | (South Africa) Gary Player (3) | 278 | −10 | Playoff (Note: Player beat Bland with a birdie at the second extra hole.) | (South Africa) John Bland | Royal Portrush (Dunluce) |
| 1996 | (Scotland) Brian Barnes (2) | 277 | −11 | 3 strokes | (New Zealand) Bob Charles (United States) David Oakley | Royal Portrush (Dunluce) |
| 1995 | (Scotland) Brian Barnes | 281 | −7 | Playoff (Note: Barnes beat Murphy with an eagle at the third extra hole.) | (United States) Bob Murphy | Royal Portrush (Dunluce) |
| 1994 | (United States) Tom Wargo | 280 | −8 | 2 strokes | (New Zealand) Bob Charles (United States) Doug Dalziel | Royal Lytham & St. Annes |
| 1993 | (New Zealand) Bob Charles (2) | 291 | +7 | 1 stroke | (England) Tommy Horton (South Africa) Gary Player | Royal Lytham & St. Annes |
| 1992 | (South Africa) John Fourie | 282 | −2 | 3 strokes | (New Zealand) Bob Charles (England) Neil Coles | Royal Lytham & St. Annes |
Seniors' British Open
| 1991 | (South Africa) Bobby Verwey | 285 | +1 | 1 stroke | (New Zealand) Bob Charles (England) Tommy Horton | Royal Lytham & St. Annes |
Volvo Seniors' British Open
| 1990 | (South Africa) Gary Player (2) | 280 | E | 1 stroke | (United States) Deane Beman (England) Brian Waites | Turnberry (Ailsa) |
| 1989 | (New Zealand) Bob Charles | 269 | −11 | 7 strokes | (United States) Billy Casper | Turnberry (Ailsa) |
| 1988 | (South Africa) Gary Player | 272 | −8 | 1 stroke | (United States) Billy Casper | Turnberry (Ailsa) |
Seniors' British Open
| 1987 | (England) Neil Coles | 279 | −1 | 1 stroke | (New Zealand) Bob Charles | Turnberry (Ailsa) |

== Multiple winners ==
Seven players have multiple victories in the Senior Open Championship:

- 4 wins: Bernhard Langer (2010, 2014, 2017, 2019)
- 3 wins: Gary Player (1988, 1990, 1997), Tom Watson (2003, 2005, 2007)
- 2 wins: Bob Charles (1989, 1993), Brian Barnes (1995, 1996), Christy O'Connor Jnr (1999, 2000), Loren Roberts (2006, 2009)

== Winners of both The Open and The Senior Open ==
Five players have won both The Open Championship and The Senior Open Championship, (two of the professional majors run by the R&A).

| Player | The Open Championship | The Senior Open Championship |
|---|---|---|
| (South Africa) Gary Player | 1959, 1968, 1974 | 1988, 1990, 1997 |
| (New Zealand) Bob Charles | 1963 | 1989, 1993 |
| (United States) Tom Watson | 1975, 1977, 1980, 1982, 1983 | 2003, 2005, 2007 |
| (Northern Ireland) Darren Clarke | 2011 | 2022 |
| (Republic of Ireland) Pádraig Harrington | 2007, 2008 | 2025 |

== Host courses ==
The Senior Open Championship has been played at the following courses, listed in order of number of times hosted (as of 2024):

- 7 Turnberry Golf Club (Ailsa)
- 6 Royal Portrush Golf Club (Dunluce)
- 5 Royal Lytham & St Annes Golf Club
- 4 Sunningdale Golf Club (Old Course)
- 3 Royal County Down Golf Club (Championship), Royal Porthcawl Golf Club, Carnoustie Golf Links (Championship)
- 2 Gleneagles (King's), Royal Troon Golf Club (Old)
- 1 St Andrews Links (Old), Muirfield, Royal Birkdale Golf Club, Walton Heath Golf Club, Royal Aberdeen Golf Club (Balgownie)

=== Future venues ===
| Year | Course | Town | County | Country | Dates |
|---|---|---|---|---|---|
| 2027 | Royal Porthcawl | Porthcawl | Bridgend County Borough | Wales | 22–25 July |
