= Trump Turnberry =

Golf resort on the Firth of Clyde in South Ayrshire, southwest Scotland

- Location in Scotland
- 55°18′55″N 04°49′58″W

Club information
- Location: Turnberry, South Ayrshire, Scotland
- Established: 1906, 120 years ago
- Type: Private
- Owner: The Trump Organization
- Total holes: 45
- Tournaments: The Open Championship (4); Senior Open Champ. (7); Women's British Open (2); Walker Cup (1)
- Website: turnberry.co.uk

Ailsa Course
- Designed by: Willie Fernie, redesigned by Mackenzie Ross 1949–51, redesigned by Martin Ebert 2015–16
- Par: 71
- Length: 7,448 yards (6,810 m)

King Robert the Bruce Course
- Designed by: Martin Ebert
- Par: 72
- Length: 7,204 yards (6,587 m)

Arran Course
- Par: 31
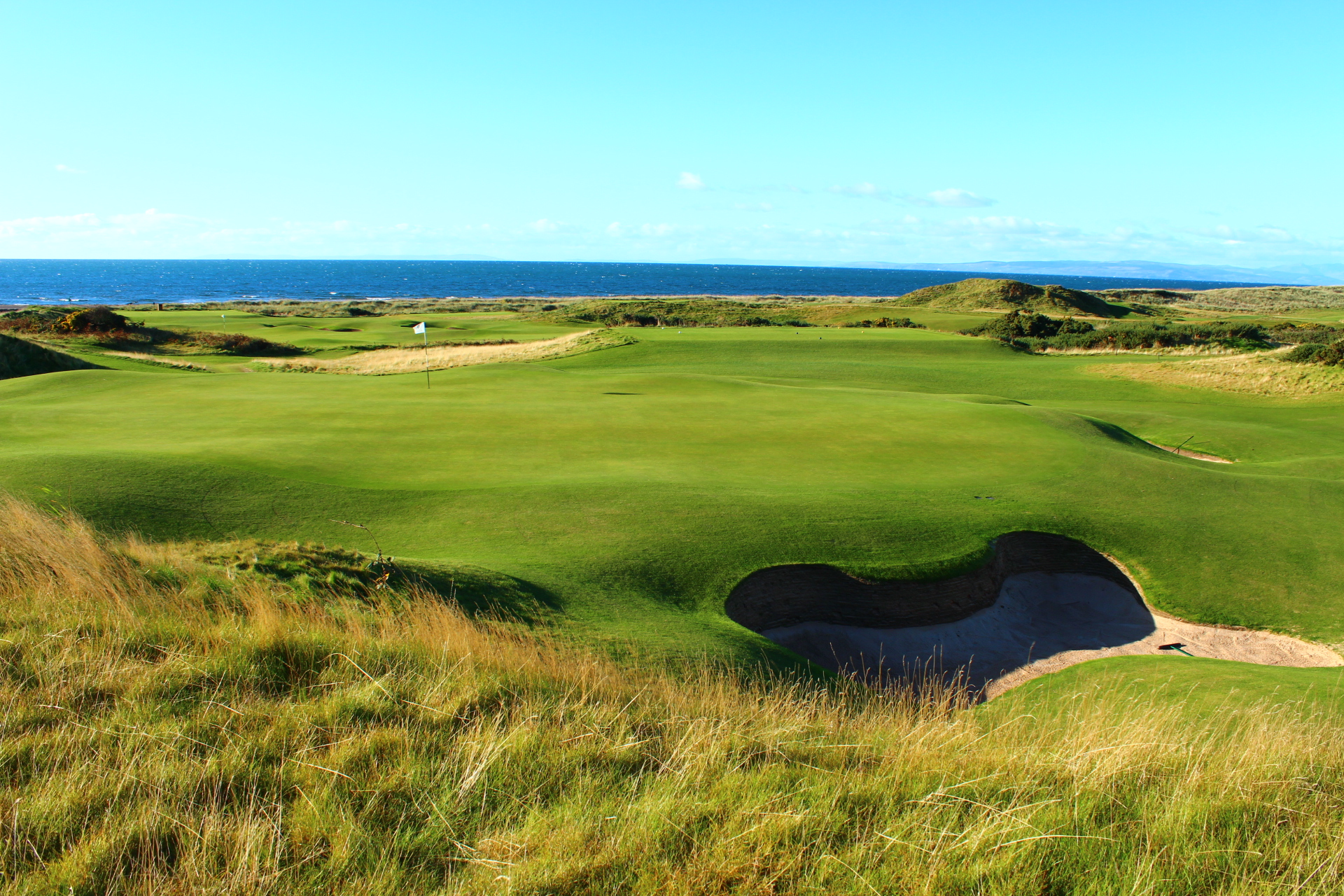
- Trump Turnberry Golf Course, November 2016

Trump Turnberry is a golf resort in Turnberry, South Ayrshire, located on the Firth of Clyde in southwest Scotland. It comprises three links golf courses, a golf academy, a five-star James Miller-designed hotel from 1906, along with lodge and cottage accommodations. Turnberry was a popular golf course and resort from its inception, made accessible because of the Maidens and Dunure Light Railway. It closed in both World Wars for military use, and there was concern it would not open following World War II, but it was redesigned by Mackenzie Ross and re-opened in 1951.

The course was the scene of the 1977 Open Championship, where Tom Watson scored a close victory over Jack Nicklaus. The property has been owned by the Trump Organization since 2014, who now brand the course Trump Turnberry.

== Location ==
The resort is 50 miles (80 km) south of Glasgow, on the A719 just north of the A77, a major road from Glasgow to Stranraer via Ayr. It is sited on headland along the Firth of Clyde, overlooking the Isle of Arran and Ailsa Craig.

== History ==
=== Development ===
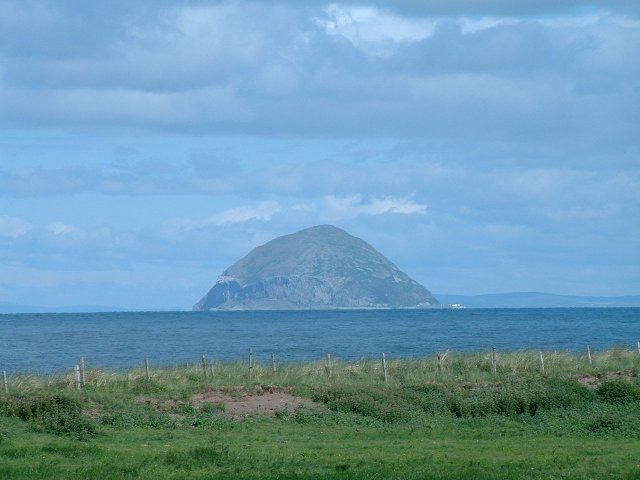
Ailsa Craig to the southwest, from the South Ayrshire coast

The idea of the course came from The 3rd Marquess of Ailsa after the announcement of the Maidens and Dunure Light Railway in 1899. The line would follow the Ayrshire coastline from Ayr to Girvan. Lord Ailsa owned 175 acres (71 ha) of land at Turnberry Green, south of Maidens, which was infertile and unsuitable for agriculture, and therefore an ideal golf course location. He realised the new railway would provide easy access for people wanting to visit a quality course. Following the construction of the line, he asked 1883 Open Championship winner Willie Fernie to design a suitable course. Fernie designed an initial round of 13 holes in 1901, with a second-round following later.

The hotel was designed by station architect James Miller, whose other work included Glasgow Central and Stirling railway stations. It was built adjacent to the railway, and opened concurrently with the station on 17 May 1906. The course was intended to attract visitors from across Britain, and was advertised heavily in the national press.

=== World Wars ===
The property was used as an airbase during the First World War, and a landing strip built for this purpose still exists, now disused. The Royal Flying Corps (RFC) trained pilots in the arts of aerial gunnery and combat, and the Turnberry Hotel was used as a hospital for the wounded. After the war, courses 1 and 2 were rebuilt and renamed "Ailsa" and "Arran". A memorial to honour lost airmen was erected on the hill overlooking the ninth hole of Ailsa, which is still standing.

The cycle was repeated during the Second World War. The hotel was commissioned as a hospital, and the golf courses were seconded for air training for the Royal Air Force (RAF); it is thought that as many as 200 died at the base. Following the war, the course was in need of refurbishment and the hotel was in a dilapidated state. Frank Hole, chairman of British Transport Hotels, convinced the British Government that golf courses should be rebuilt and restored. The architect Mackenzie Ross rebuilt the course, removing the wartime runways and covering the land with sand and topsoil. Ross is credited with restoring the courses to their high quality, and the Ailsa course was re-opened in 1951, a seaside links with views of Ailsa Craig and the Isle of Arran.

=== Transport links ===
The hotel and golf course was served by its own dedicated railway station. Turnberry railway station opened in 1906 and operated until 1942, when the Maidens and Dunure Light Railway line was partially closed.

=== Starwood ownership ===
Starwood acquired the hotel in 1997, and until 2008, it was operated under the Westin Hotels & Resorts brand. In 2008, Leisurecorp, Dubai World's sport and leisure subsidiary, purchased the resort, with Starwood continuing to manage operations under The Luxury Collection brand.

=== Trump ownership ===
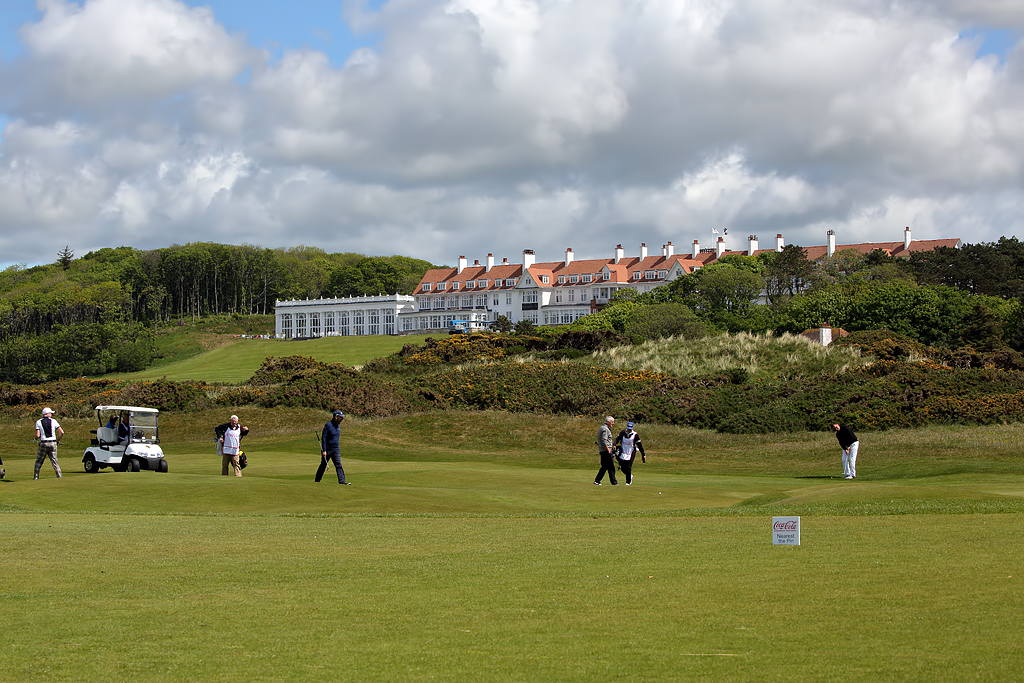
The course in 2019, with the Turnberry Hotel situated in the background

Donald Trump purchased the hotel and golf courses from Leisurecorp in 2014 for $60 million, and the resort was renamed Trump Turnberry.

In 2006, the Aberdeen Renewable Energy Group began constructing, the European Offshore Wind Deployment Centre an offshore wind farm with 11 turbines, near this golf course. By 2015, Trump had taken the fight against the European Offshore Wind Deployment Centre to the Supreme Court of the United Kingdom. In 2019, a court ruled against Trump and they must pay the Scottish government's legal bills. The company objected because the proposed windfarm would be seen by people at the resort.

2014-2019 Trump Turnberry total losses were $61 million In 2018, Trump Turnberry resort lost 3.4 million UK pounds, losing millions for a fourth consecutive year. In 2019, Trump Turnberry resort lost more than £2.3 million UK pounds. In 2020, Trump Turnberry resort lost more than £5.3 million UK pounds. In 2021, Trump Turnberry resort lost more than £3.7 million UK pounds. In 2022, Trump Turnberry resort profits were £186,000. In 2023, Trump Turnberry resort profits were £3.8 million.

In 2017, Trump resigned his directorship of the companies which own Trump Turnberry just before he was inaugurated as president of the United States, and passed control to his sons Donald Jr and Eric. The Trump Organization claims to have spent about $200 million on renovating the course; $18 million were accounted for in 2016. Donald Trump remains the owner of Golf Recreation Scotland, which in turn owns SLC Turnberry.

Financing for Trump's golf courses in Ireland and Scotland came under scrutiny in the Special Counsel investigation into Russian interference in the 2016 United States elections.

In September 2019, it was reported that the House Oversight and Reform Committee of the United States Congress was investigating increased military expenditure at Glasgow Prestwick Airport that might constitute a conflict of interest in regard to the Trump Turnberry golf course. It was reported in September 2019 that the Pentagon had spent nearly $200,000 at Turnberry since Trump took office, although stays by United States Air Force crews remained consistent compared to previous years with only 6% staying at Turnberry from 2015–2019. A report released by Air Mobility Command in response to the investigation found no wrongdoing by its aircrews in acquiring accommodation around the Prestwick Airport.

In February 2023, the company managing the golf course, SLC Turnberry Ltd., reported pre-tax losses of 3.7 million pounds ($4.57 million) in 2021.

In March 2025, the course was vandalized by pro-Palestinian activists in protest of President Trump's proposal to take over Gaza. Palestine Action took credit for the damage.

On 27 July 2025, the United States and the European Union concluded a trade agreement, providing for 15% tariffs on European exports. The deal was announced by President Trump and President of the European Commission, Ursula von der Leyen, at Turnberry.

==== Open Championship future ====
After the 2021 United States Capitol attack, the organizer of the championship, The R&A, announced that The Open would not be held again at Turnberry as long as its links to the Trump Organization remain. However, following Donald Trump's victory in the 2024 U.S. elections and presidential inauguration in January 2025, the newly hired CEO of The R&A stated that the organization was doing some "feasibility work" regarding a potential return to Turnberry.

== Courses ==
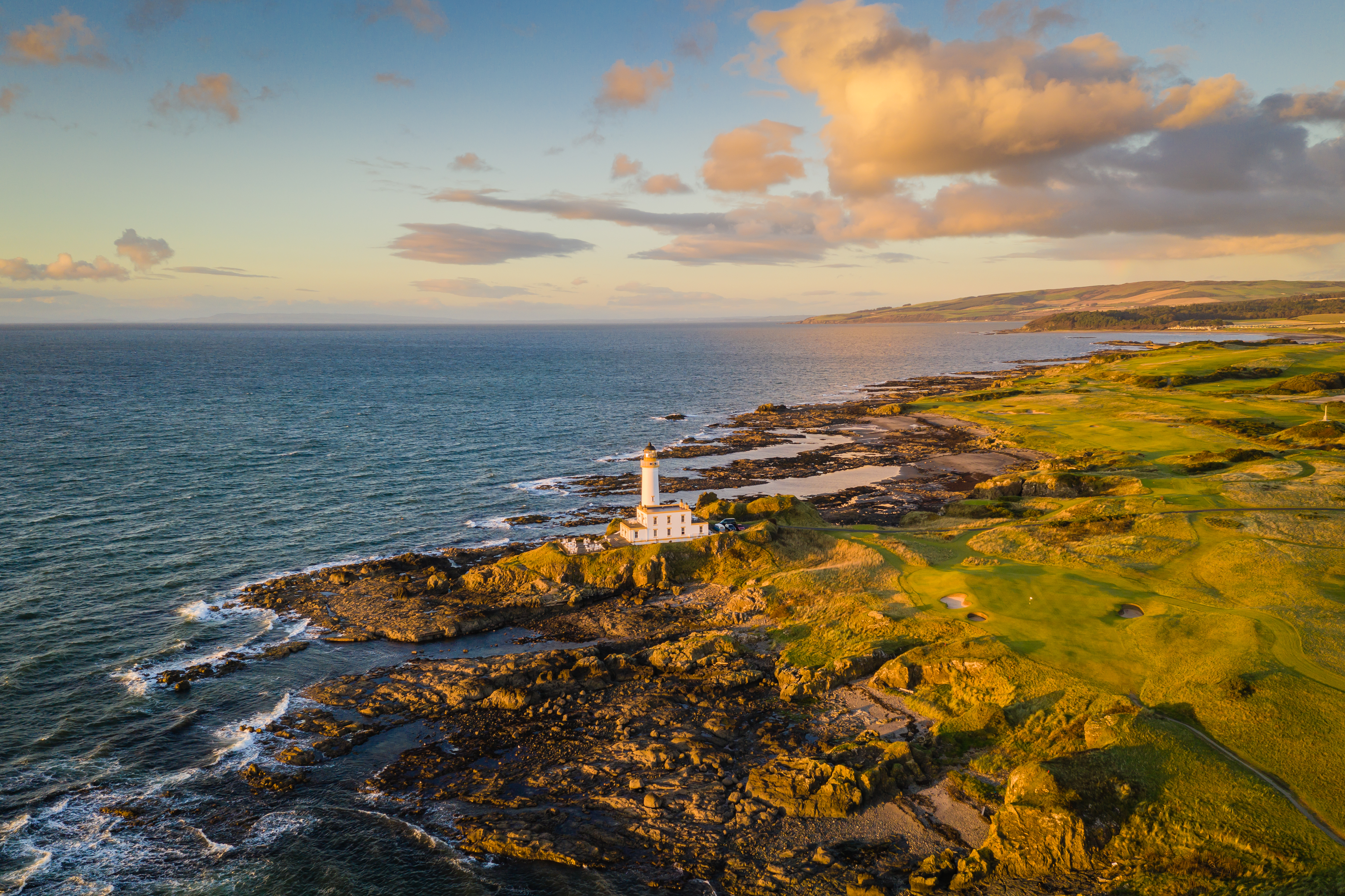
Turnberry lighthouse at sunset surrounded by the golf course

The Ailsa Course, redesigned by Mackenzie Ross between 1949 and 1951, and again by Martin Ebert between 2015 and 2016, has staged The Open Championship on four occasions (1977, 1986, 1994, and 2009). It has also hosted many other important golf tournaments, including the Women's British Open in 2002, the Walker Cup in 1963, the Amateur Championship in 1961, 1983, 1996, and 2008, and the Senior Open Championship on seven occasions, 1987–90, 2003, 2006, and 2012. The Ailsa Course is featured in the 2004 golf video game Tiger Woods PGA Tour 2005.

The other two courses at Turnberry are the King Robert the Bruce course and the nine-hole Arran course. The Kintyre Course, opened in 2001 and existed at the resort until it was replaced by the King Robert the Bruce course in 2017. The Kintyre Course was designed by Donald Steel and built on the foundations of the old Arran layout, which had been rebuilt along with the Ailsa Course following World War II. During the war, the resort was used as a hospital and the courses were flattened and paved for use as a major RAF airfield. The new Arran Course opened in 2002.

Other golf facilities at the resort include the Colin Montgomerie Links Golf Academy and a pitch and putt course.

In 2003, the 18th hole on the Ailsa Course, "Ailsa Hame", was renamed "Duel in the Sun" as homage to the battle between Tom Watson and Jack Nicklaus in 1977; this is also the name of a sports bar at the resort. In 2009, Watson, 59, held a one-shot lead when he bogeyed this hole in the final round, eventually losing the Open Championship in a playoff to Stewart Cink.

== Awards ==
Turnberry Golf Courses and Resort have won/hold various awards including:

- Ailsa Course ranked No. 8 and King Robert the Bruce Course ranked No. 94 – World's 100 Greatest Golf Courses, Golf Digest 2024
- No. 2 in Scotland and 3rd in Great Britain, 2024 – National Club Golfer
- No. 2 Golf Course in Scotland, 2023 – Top 100 Golf Courses
- 4th Best Golf Resorts in Europe, 2023 – Leadingcourses.com
- Top 100 Greenest Courses Europe 2024 – Golf World
- The Ailsa ranked the No. 3 golf course in UK & Ireland, 2023 – Golf Monthly
- Forbes Travel Guide Five-Star Hotel Award, 2024

== Ailsa Course scorecard ==
The official names are:

Hole	Yards (metres)	Par	Name	Meaning
1	441 (403)	4	Ailsa Craig	Named after the island
2	425 (389)	4	Mak Siccar	Make sure
3	496 (454)	4	Blaw Wearie	Out of breath
4	194 (177)	3	Woe-Be-Tide	A warning about the Firth of Clyde
5	531 (486)	5	Fin Me Oot	Find me out
6	171 (156)	3	Tappie Toorie	Hit to the top
7	476 (435)	5	Roon The Ben	Round the mountain
8	454 (415)	4	Goat Fell	Named after the tallest peak on the Isle of Arran
9	248 (227)	3	Bruce's Castle	Named after Turnberry Castle, which is adjacent to the course
Out	3,436 (3,142)	35		
10	565 (517)	5	Dinna Fouter	Don't mess about
11	215 (197)	3	Maidens	Named after a small village near the course
12	468 (428)	4	Monument	Named after the memorial to lost airmen from both World Wars
13	409 (374)	4	Tickly Tap	Tricky little stroke
14	568 (519)	5	Risk-An-Hope	Risk and hope
15	234 (214)	3	Ca' Canny	Take care
16	509 (465)	4	Wee Burn	Named after Wilson's burn, which runs in front of the green
17	559 (511)	4	Lang Whang	Long whack
18	485 (443)	4	Duel in the Sun (formerly Ailsa Hame)	Re-named in 2003 in reference to the contest between Tom Watson and Jack Nicklaus in the 1977 Open.
In	4,012 (3,669)	36		
Total	7,448 (6,810)	71		

== Tournaments held at Turnberry ==
=== The Open Championship ===
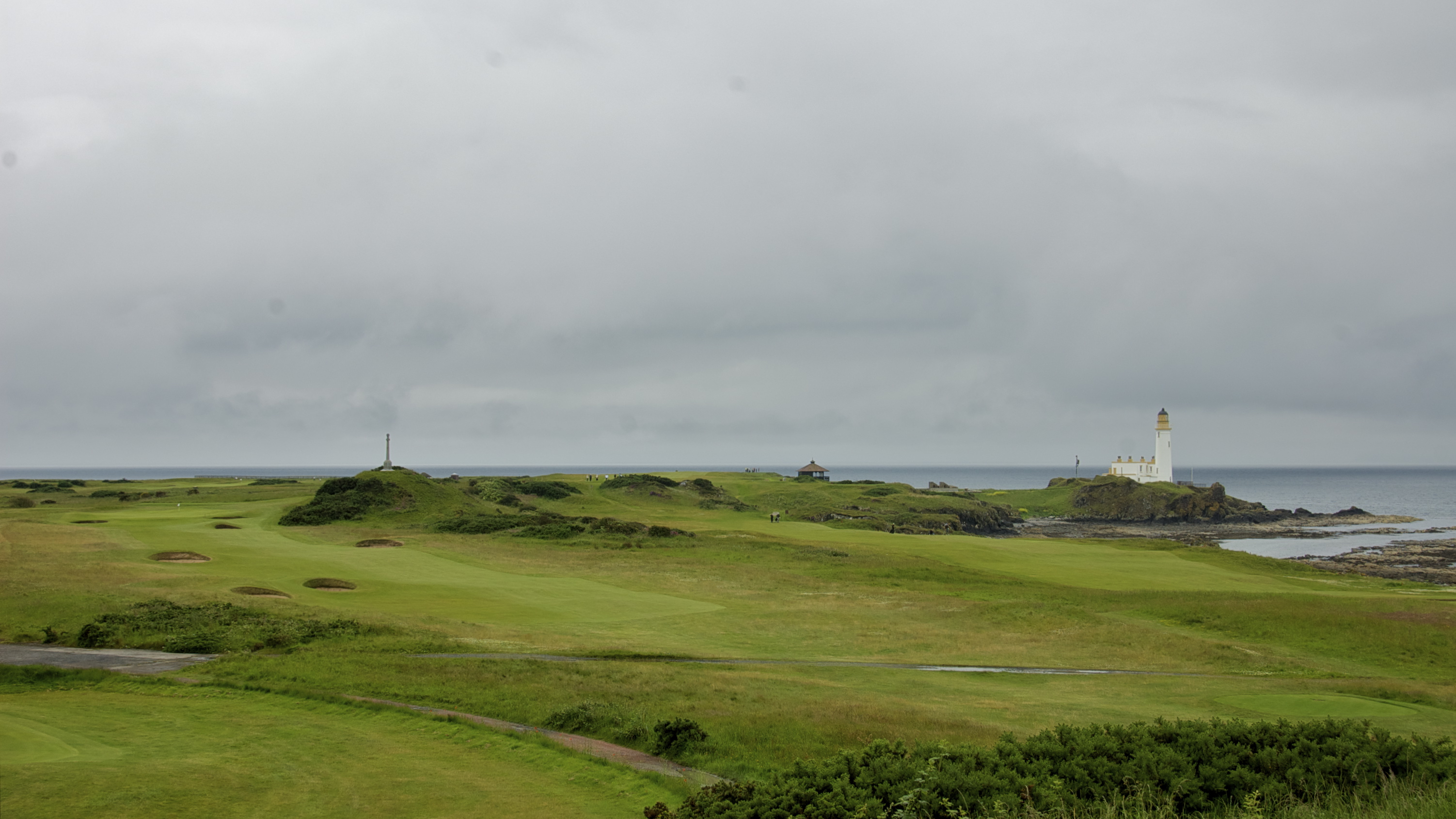
The 10th and 12th holes on the Open Championship venue Ailsa course

At its first Open Championship in 1977, the course was the scene of the famous "Duel in the Sun", when Tom Watson claimed a classic victory, one stroke ahead of Jack Nicklaus.

The two were paired during the final two rounds and finished well ahead of the rest of the field. They posted identical scores for the first three rounds, and were tied through the 16th hole of the final round. Nicklaus missed a short birdie putt on the par-5 17th hole to tie Watson, who had reached in two and birdied. On the par-4 18th hole, Nicklaus recovered from the rough and sank a lengthy birdie putt, which forced Watson to sink his short birdie putt to win, which he did. It was the second of Watson's five Open titles; down two strokes on the 13th tee, he bested Nicklaus by three shots over the final six holes.

Nine years later in 1986, Greg Norman claimed the first of his two Opens (his only major titles), winning by five strokes. Nick Price won his second major (and only Open) in 1994, a single stroke ahead of runner-up Jesper Parnevik.

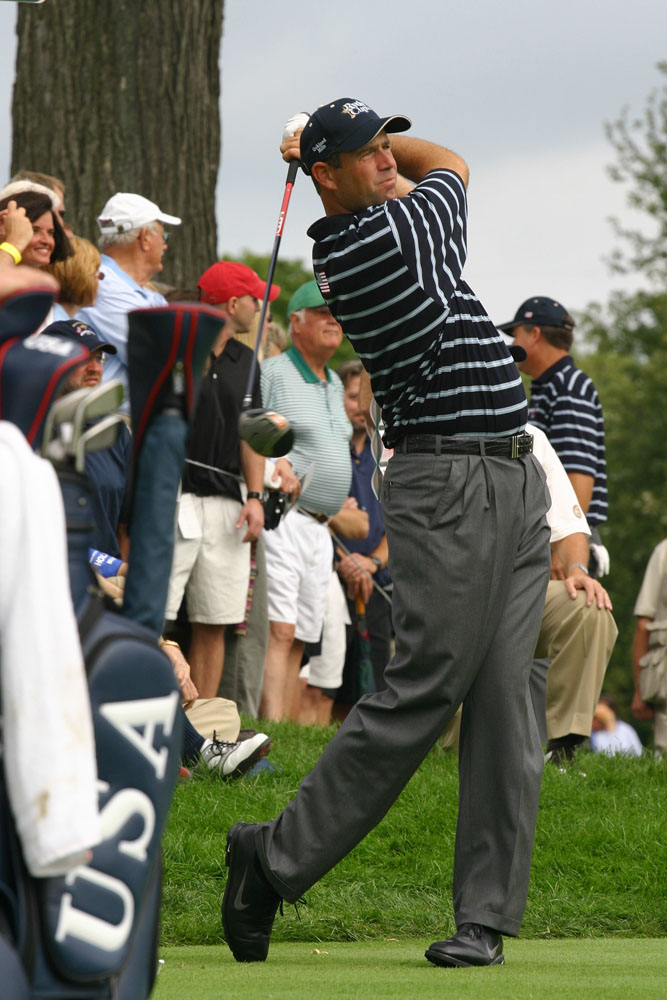
Stewart Cink, who won the 2009 Open Championship, the most recent to be held at Turnberry

After a fifteen-year absence, the Ailsa Course hosted the Open in 2009, where 59-year-old Watson nearly won his sixth Open Championship. Up by a stroke at the 72nd hole, his approach shot took an unfortunate bounce on the front of the green, then ran off the back and led to a bogey. Watson then lost a four-hole playoff with Stewart Cink by six strokes; Cink birdied the 72nd hole and then posted two pars and two birdies in the playoff to win his only major title.

In 2015, the governing body for Golf, The R&A, announced that the 2020 Open Championship would not be played at Turnberry, even though it had previously been considered likely to host the tournament. The R&A were unimpressed with several remarks by Donald Trump; one member said he would like Turnberry to host the Open again, but "not Trump Turnberry". In February 2018 the U.S. Ambassador to Britain, Robert Wood "Woody" Johnson IV, told colleagues that he had been instructed by then-President Trump to seek British government help in securing the British Open for Turnberry. Although advised not to do so by his deputy, Lewis Lukens, he reportedly did suggest to David Mundell, the Secretary of State for Scotland, that the Open be moved to Turnberry. However, a later British government statement said that Johnson "made no request of Mr. Mundell regarding the British Open or any other sporting event."

Following the 2021 storming of the United States Capitol, the R&A announced that it had no plans to stage any of its competitions at Turnberry and would not do so "until we are convinced that the focus will be on the championship, the players and the course itself".

The Open Championship winners at Turnberry, all played on the par-70 Ailsa Course:

Year	Winner	Score					Winner's share (£)
Year	Winner	R1	R2	R3	R4	Total	Winner's share (£)
1977	(United States) Tom Watson ^{2nd}	68	70	65	65	268 (−12)	10,000
1986	(Australia) Greg Norman ^{1st}	74	63	74	69	280 (Even)	70,000
1994	(Zimbabwe) Nick Price	69	66	67	66	268 (−12)	110,000
2009	(United States) Stewart Cink	66	72	71	69	278 (−2)^{PO}	750,000

- Note: For multiple winners of The Open Championship, superscript ordinal identifies which in their respective careers.

=== The Senior Open Championship ===
Winners of The Senior Open Championship at Turnberry.

Year	Winner	Country	Score
1987	Neil Coles	England	279 (−1)
1988	Gary Player	South Africa	272 (−8)
1989	Bob Charles	New Zealand	269 (−11)
1990	Gary Player	South Africa	280 (Even)
2003	Tom Watson	United States	263 (−17)^{PO}
2006	Loren Roberts	United States	274 (−6)^{PO}
2012	Fred Couples	United States	271 (−9)

=== Women's British Open ===
Winner of the Women's British Open at Turnberry.

Year	Winner	Country	Score
2002	Karrie Webb	Australia	273 (−15)
2015	Inbee Park	South Korea	276 (−12)

The Ailsa Course was played as a par-72 at 6,407 yards (5,859 m) in 2002; and played marginally longer at 6,410 yards (5,860 m) in 2015.

== See also ==
- List of things named after Donald Trump
- List of windmills in Scotland
- Donald Trump and golf
- Turnberry Castle
- Maidens, South Ayrshire
