= 1986 Open Championship =

Coordinates: 55.316°N 4.832°W

Tournament information
- Dates: 17–20 July 1986
- Location: South Ayrshire, Scotland
- Course(s): Turnberry; Ailsa Course
- Tour(s): European Tour; PGA Tour

Statistics
- Par: 70
- Length: 6,957 yards (6,361 m)
- Field: 153 players, 77 after cut
- Cut: 151 (+11)
- Prize fund: £600,000 $900,000
- Winner's share: £70,000 $105,000

Champion
- (Australia) Greg Norman
- 280 (E)

Location in Scotland
Location in South Ayrshire, Scotland

The 1986 Open Championship was a men's major golf championship and the 115th Open Championship, held from 17 to 20 July at Turnberry Golf Resort, Scotland. Aided by a 63 in the second round, Greg Norman won his first major championship at even-par, five strokes ahead of runner-up Gordon J. Brand.

It was the second Open at Turnberry, the first was in 1977, the famous "Duel in the Sun" between Tom Watson and Jack Nicklaus. The winning score that year was a record-breaking 268 (−12), twelve strokes lower than Norman's even-par 280 in 1986.

Introduced in 1968, the second cut (at 54 holes) was discontinued after 1985. Also changed in 1986 was the playoff format, to a four-hole aggregate immediately following the final round, rather than 18 holes the following day (and 36 holes prior to 1964). The new playoff was first used three years later in 1989.

== Course ==
Ailsa Course

Hole	Name	Yards	Par	Hole	Name	Yards	Par
1	Ailsa Craig	350	4	10	Dinna Fouter	452	4
2	Mak Siccar	428	4	11	Maidens	177	3
3	Blaw Wearie	462	4	12	Monument	448	4
4	Woe-Be-Tide	167	3	13	Tickly Tap	411	4
5	Fin Me Oot	441	4	14	Risk-An-Hope	440	4
6	Tappie Toorie	222	3	15	Ca' Canny	209	3
7	Roon The Ben	528	5	16	Wee Burn	409	4
8	Goat Fell	427	4	17	Lang Whang	500	5
9	Bruce's Castle	455	4	18	Ailsa Hame ^	431	4
Out		3,480	35	In		3,477	35
Source:				Total		6,957	70

^ The 18th hole was renamed "Duel in the Sun" in 2003.

Previous length of the course for The Open Championship:

- 1977: 6,875 yards (6,286 m), par 70

== Round summaries ==
=== First round ===
Thursday, 17 July 1986

Place	Player	Score	To par
1	(Wales) Ian Woosnam	70	E
T2	(England) Gordon J. Brand	71	+1
T2	(England) Nick Faldo	71	+1
T2	(Sweden) Anders Forsbrand	71	+1
T2	(England) Robert Lee	71	+1
T6	(Scotland) Andrew Brooks	72	+2
T6	(United States) Ron Commans	72	+2
T6	(England) Derrick Cooper	72	+2
T6	(West Germany) Bernhard Langer	72	+2
T6	(United States) Sam Randolph	72	+2
T6	(Australia) Ian Stanley	72	+2

=== Second round ===
Friday, 18 July 1986

Place	Player	Score	To par
1	(Australia) Greg Norman	74-63=137	−3
2	(England) Gordon J. Brand	71-68=139	−1
T3	(England) Nick Faldo	71-70=141	+1
T3	(Japan) Tsuneyuki Nakajima	74-67=141	+1
5	(West Germany) Bernhard Langer	72-70=142	+2
T6	(Spain) José María Cañizares	76-68=144	+4
T6	(Sweden) Anders Forsbrand	71-73=144	+4
T6	(New Zealand) Greg Turner	73-71=144	+4
T6	(Wales) Ian Woosnam	70-74=144	+4
T10	(Scotland) Andrew Brooks	72-73=145	+5
T10	(England) Roger Chapman	74-71=145	+5
T10	(United States) Raymond Floyd	78-67=145	+5
T10	(United States) Donnie Hammond	74-71=145	+5
T10	(United States) Gary Koch	73-72=145	+5
T10	(United States) Payne Stewart	76-69=145	+5
T10	(United States) Bob Tway	74-71=145	+5
T10	(United States) D. A. Weibring	75-70=145	+5

Amateurs: Davis (+16), Cotton (+18), McGimpsey (+21), Robinson (+22), Curry (+25).

=== Third round ===
Saturday, 19 July 1986

Place	Player	Score	To par
1	(Australia) Greg Norman	74-63-74=211	+1
2	(Japan) Tsuneyuki Nakajima	74-67-71=212	+2
T3	(England) Gordon J. Brand	71-68-75=214	+4
T3	(Wales) Ian Woosnam	70-74-70=214	+4
T5	(Spain) José María Cañizares	76-68-73=217	+7
T5	(England) Nick Faldo	71-70-76=217	+7
T5	(United States) Gary Koch	73-72-72=217	+7
T8	(United States) Raymond Floyd	78-67-73=218	+8
T8	(Australia) David Graham	75-73-70=218	+8
T8	(West Germany) Bernhard Langer	72-70-76=218	+8
T8	(Scotland) Sam Torrance	78-69-71=218	+8

=== Final round ===
Sunday, 20 July 1986

Place	Player	Score	To par	Money (£)
1	(Australia) Greg Norman	74-63-74-69=280	E	70,000
2	(England) Gordon J. Brand	71-68-75-71=285	+5	50,000
T3	(West Germany) Bernhard Langer	72-70-76-68=286	+6	35,000
T3	(Wales) Ian Woosnam	70-74-70-72=286	+6	35,000
5	(England) Nick Faldo	71-70-76-70=287	+7	25,000
T6	(Spain) Seve Ballesteros	76-75-73-64=288	+8	22,000
T6	(United States) Gary Koch	73-72-72-71=288	+8	22,000
T8	(Scotland) Brian Marchbank	78-70-72-69=289	+9	17,333
T8	(Japan) Tsuneyuki Nakajima	74-67-71-77=289	+9	17,333
T8	(United States) Fuzzy Zoeller	75-73-72-69=289	+9	17,333

- The exchange rate at the time was approximately 1.50 dollars (US) per pound sterling.
