= Mackenzie Ross =

Scottish golf course architect

Philip Mackenzie Ross (1890–1974) was a Scottish golf course architect who worked throughout Europe developing golf courses in France, Spain and Portugal as well as the United Kingdom. After 1945 he carried out a great deal of remodelling and restoration and in 1949 completed Southerness, in southwest Scotland, which is probably his most respected work. In 1971 Ross was elected the first president of the British Association of Golf Course Architects.

== Golf courses ==
A partial list of courses designed or worked on by Ross includes:

- Estoril Golf Club, Portugal
- Southerness Golf Club, Scotland
- Turnberry, Scotland
- Furnas Golf Course, Azores, Portugal https://www.portugalgolf.net/en/golf-courses/azores-furnas-golf-course/145/
