= Noboru Sugai =

Japanese golfer

Noboru Sugai 須貝 昇
Personal information
- Nationality: Japan
- Born: 16 October 1949 (age 77) Tokyo, Japan
- Height: 1.78 m (5 ft 10 in)
- Weight: 78 kg (172 lb; 12.3 st)

Career
- Sport: Golf
- Turned professional: 1975
- Former tours: Japan Golf Tour; European Seniors Tour
- Professional wins: 6

Number of wins by tour
- Japan Golf Tour: 3
- PGA Tour Champions: 1
- European Senior Tour: 1

Best results in major championships
- Masters Tournament: DNP
- PGA Championship: DNP
- U.S. Open: DNP
- The Open Championship: CUT: 1993, 2003

Noboru Sugai Sugai Noboru (須貝 昇; born 16 October 1949) is a Japanese professional golfer.

== Career ==
Sugai was born in Tokyo, to a Japanese father and a Russian mother. He turned professional in 1975 and has won three tournaments and over 275 million ¥ on the Japan Golf Tour.

In 2002, he became the first Japanese to win the Senior British Open in what was the last staging before the tournament became a Champions Tour major. He played on the European Seniors Tour in 2003 and 2004 with little success.

== Professional wins (6) ==
=== PGA of Japan Tour wins (3) ===
No.	Date	Tournament	Winning score	Margin of victory	Runner(s)-up
1	13 Sep 1987	Suntory Open	−10 (67-71-72-68=278)	3 strokes	(Japan) Masahiro Kuramoto, (United States) Larry Nelson
2	29 Apr 1990	The Crowns	−4 (68-66-67-75=276)	Playoff	(United States) Steve Pate
3	14 Oct 1990	Asahi Beer Golf Digest Tournament	−10 (72-72-68-62=274)	3 strokes	(United States) Larry Mize, (Japan) Masashi Ozaki

PGA of Japan Tour playoff record (1–1)

No.	Year	Tournament	Opponent	Result
1	1990	The Crowns	(United States) Steve Pate	Won with par on first extra hole
2	1991	Japan Open Golf Championship	(Japan) Tsuneyuki Nakajima	Lost to par on first extra hole

=== European Seniors Tour wins (1) ===
Legend
Senior major championships (1)
Other European Seniors Tour (0)

No.	Date	Tournament	Winning score	Margin of victory	Runner-up
1	28 Jul 2002	Senior British Open	−3 (67-67-73-74=281)	2 strokes	(Canada) John Irwin

=== Other senior wins (2) ===
- 2000 Fujita Kanko Open (Japan)
- 2001 Castle Hill Open (Japan)

== Results in major championships ==
Tournament	1993	1994	1995	1996	1997	1998	1999	2000	2001	2002	2003
The Open Championship	CUT										CUT

Note: Sugai only played in The Open Championship.

Did not play

CUT = missed the half-way cut

== Senior major championships ==
=== Wins (1) ===
Year	Championship	Winning score	Margin	Runner-up
2002	Senior British Open	−3 (67-67-73-74=281)	2 strokes	(Canada) John Irwin

== Team appearances ==
- Four Tours World Championship (representing Japan): 1990, 1991
