= The R&A =

Golf governing body

- The R&A headquarters, Beach House, Golf Place, St Andrews, Scotland.

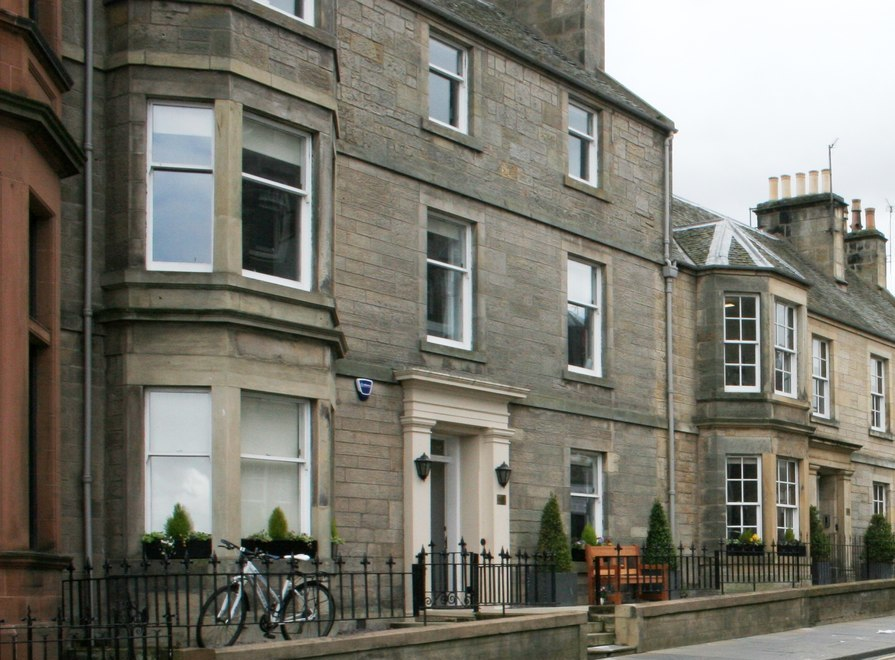
- Sport: Golf
- Founded: 2004
- Affiliation: United States Golf Association
- Regional affiliation: Worldwide, except the United States, Mexico
- Headquarters: Beach House, Golf Place, St Andrews, Scotland; 56.343565°N 2.802801°W
- Chairman: Ian Pattinson
- CEO: Mark Darbon

Official website
- www.randa.org
- (Scotland)

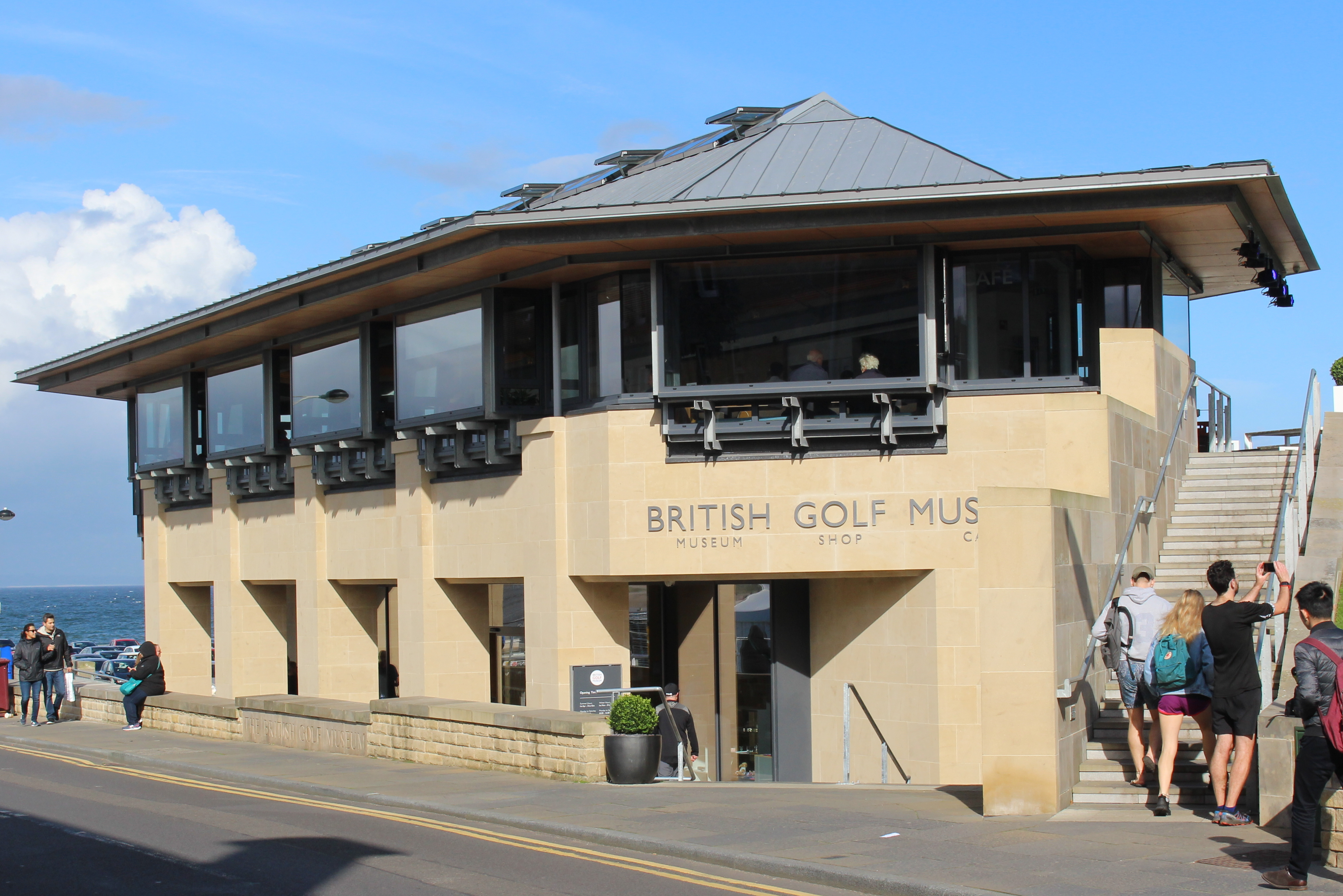
The R&A World Golf Museum

The R&A (formally the R&A Trust Company (No. 1) Limited) is the collective name of a group of companies that together play a significant role in the game of golf. Historically, "the R&A" was a colloquial name for the Royal and Ancient Golf Club of St Andrews; in 2004, the club spun off its previous governance and tournament organisation roles into the current R&A group, and the club itself reverted to a private members-only club. The R&A is based in St Andrews, Scotland, and is the sole owner of three subsidiary companies: R&A Rules Limited, R&A Championships Limited, and R&A Group Services Limited.

R&A Rules Limited is one of the governing bodies of golf worldwide, alongside the United States Golf Association (USGA). The USGA governs in the United States and Mexico, while the R&A governs in the rest of the world. They share a single code for the rules of golf, rules of amateur status, equipment standards and the World Amateur Golf rankings.

R&A Championships Limited organises The Open Championship, which is the world's oldest international men's major golf championship; the Women's British Open; the Senior Open Championship; as well as the Walker Cup and Curtis Cup.

The Royal and Ancient Golf Club founded what is now the Official World Golf Ranking for male professionals in 1986, and the R&A introduced the World Amateur Golf Ranking for male amateurs in 2007. The R&A also owns and operates the R&A World Golf Museum.

== Rules of golf ==
The R&A cooperates with the USGA in producing and regularly revising the rules of golf, and the two bodies have issued rules jointly since 1952. The rules are revised on a four-year cycle. From 1990 for the first time a single set of rules applied throughout the world. The two bodies also collaborate on the corresponding interpretive publication "Decisions on the Rules of Golf", which is reviewed on a two-year cycle. Additionally, the R&A is involved in formulating technical specifications for golf equipment, which were first issued 1 January 2019.

== Championships ==
The R&A organises 21 championships and international matches, which were previously organised by the Royal and Ancient Golf Club. After the Ladies' Golf Union, the former governing body for women's golf in Great Britain and Ireland, merged into The R&A in late 2016, The R&A took over organisation of all events formerly under the auspices of the LGU.

- The Open Championship: one of the four major championships in men's golf
- Women's British Open: one of the five major championships in women's golf. The 2017 edition was the first to be organised by the R&A.
- The Amateur Championship: was one of the four major championships before the professional game became dominant and is still one of the most prestigious amateur tournaments in the world.
- The Women's Amateur Championship: one of the most prestigious women's amateur tournaments in the world
- Ladies' British Open Amateur Stroke Play Championship: similar to the above, except conducted exclusively at stroke play
- Boys Amateur Championship: for boys under the age of 18 at midnight on 1 January of the relevant year
- The Girls' British Open Amateur Championship: for girls under the age of 18 at midnight on 1 January of the relevant year
- Boys Home Internationals: a team competition for boys from England, Scotland, Wales and Ireland, with the Irish team selected on an All-Ireland basis
- Girls Home Internationals: a team competition for girls from England, Scotland, Wales and Ireland (also All-Ireland)
- Ladies' Home International: a team competition for women from England, Scotland, Wales and Ireland (also All-Ireland)
- Ladies' Senior Home Internationals: a team competition for women aged 50 and above from England, Scotland, Wales and Ireland (also All-Ireland)
- Coronation Foursomes: a team competition for women's club golfers in Great Britain & Ireland, open to any (female) member of an affiliated golf club with an official handicap of 36 or under
- Seniors Open Amateur Championship: for male amateurs aged 55 or over on the first day of competition
- Ladies' Senior British Open Amateur Championship: for female amateurs aged 50 or over on the first day of competition
- Senior Open Championship: for men aged 50 and above. A major championship on PGA Tour Champions and the European Senior Tour.
- Walker Cup: a biennial men's amateur team competition contested by Great Britain & Ireland and the United States (co-organised with the United States Golf Association)
- Curtis Cup: a biennial women's amateur team competition contested by Great Britain & Ireland and the United States (also co-organised with the United States Golf Association)
- Junior Open Championship: for boys and girls under the age of 16 at 00.00 hours on 1 January of the relevant year
- St Andrews Trophy: a biennial men's amateur team competition contested by Great Britain & Ireland and the Continent of Europe
- Vagliano Trophy: a biennial women's amateur team competition contested by Great Britain & Ireland and the Continent of Europe
- Jacques Léglise Trophy: an annual boys' amateur team competition contested by Great Britain & Ireland and the Continent of Europe. In years when the St Andrews Trophy is held, the Léglise Trophy is held in conjunction with it at the same venue.
- Junior Vagliano Trophy: a biennial girls' amateur team competition contested by Great Britain & Ireland and the Continent of Europe
