= 1977 Open Championship =

Coordinates: 55.316°N 4.832°W

Tournament information
- Dates: 6–9 July 1977
- Location: Ayrshire, Scotland
- Courses: Ailsa Course, Turnberry
- Tours: European Tour; PGA Tour

Statistics
- Par: 70
- Length: 6,875 yards (6,286 m)
- Field: 156 players 87 after 1st cut 64 after 2nd cut
- Cut: 150 (+10) (1st cut); 221 (+11) (2nd cut)
- Prize fund: £100,000 $170,000
- Winner's share: £10,000 $17,000

Champion
- (United States) Tom Watson
- 268 (−12)

Location in Scotland
Location in South Ayrshire, Scotland

The 1977 Open Championship was the 106th Open Championship, held 6–9 July on the Ailsa Course at Turnberry, Scotland. Tom Watson won the second of his five Open titles by one stroke over runner-up Jack Nicklaus. The two played together in the final two rounds and had separated themselves from the field under clear skies, leading this Open to be remembered as the "Duel in the Sun." This was the first Open held at Turnberry, which renamed its 18th hole after the duel. Three months earlier, Watson had held off Nicklaus to win his first green jacket at the Masters.

In the second round, Mark Hayes rebounded from his opening 76 (+6) with 63 to establish a new single round record at The Open Championship by two strokes. The previous record of 65 was set by Henry Cotton in the second round in 1934 at Royal St. George's and later equaled by nine others. Lightning briefly interrupted play in the third round on Friday.

Americans dominated the final leaderboard, filling the top eight spots and eleven of the first twelve. The first page of the leaderboard was loaded with future members of the World Golf Hall of Fame.

The leader after 36 holes, Roger Maltbie, finished with 80 for 289 (+9), in a tie for 26th place.

The previous year, Watson was defending champion, but missed the 54-hole cut after an 80 in the third round, while Nicklaus finished in a tie for second.

== Duel in the Sun ==
Watson's victory is considered by many to be the finest tournament played in the latter half of the 20th century. After two rounds, he and Nicklaus were one shot out of the lead, in a four-way tie for second, and were paired for the third round on Friday. Both shot five-under 65 for 203 (−7), three shots clear of Ben Crenshaw and six ahead of the remainder of the field after 54 holes.

Paired again for the final round on Saturday afternoon, Nicklaus birdied twice and was up by three strokes after four holes. Watson birdied three of the next four to pull even at two-under for the round, then bogeyed the ninth hole to fall one back at the turn. Nicklaus birdied the 12th hole to go two strokes ahead, then Watson birdied 13 and the par-3 15th, rolling in a putt from off the green to even up the round at three-under.

After halving the 16th with pars, it was on to the reachable par-5 17th, where Nicklaus missed the green to the right but chipped his third to four feet (1.2 m) from the cup. Watson missed an eagle putt and tapped in for birdie, but then Nicklaus two-putted for par to go a stroke down with one hole remaining. On the 18th tee, Watson drove to an ideal position in the fairway, but Nicklaus went right and into the rough. Watson's 7-iron approach stopped pin-high and two feet left of the flag, and with Nicklaus in trouble, appeared to seal the victory. But Nicklaus slashed his 8-iron recovery onto the front of the green and sank his 35-foot (11 m) putt for a remarkable birdie and a bogey-free 66. Now needing a seventh birdie of the round to avoid an 18-hole playoff, Watson sank the two-footer for his second straight 65, second Open, and third major title. With birdies on four of the final six holes, his total of 268 was eight strokes better than the previous best score in the Open.

Watson and Nicklaus finished well ahead of the other challengers, and shot the same score every day, except on Sunday. The third-place finisher, reigning U.S. Open champion Hubert Green, shot a final round 67 and was a distant ten strokes behind Nicklaus, who won his third Open (and third career grand slam) the following year at St. Andrews.

== Course ==
Ailsa Course

Hole	Name	Yards	Par	Hole	Name	Yards	Par
1	Ailsa Craig	355	4	10	Dinna Fouter	452	4
2	Mak Siccar	428	4	11	Maidens	177	3
3	Blaw Wearie	462	4	12	Monument	391	4
4	Woe-Be-Tide	167	3	13	Tickly Tap	411	4
5	Fin Me Oot	411	4	14	Risk-An-Hope	440	4
6	Tappie Toorie	222	3	15	Ca' Canny	209	3
7	Roon The Ben	528	5	16	Wee Burn	409	4
8	Goat Fell	427	4	17	Lang Whang	500	5
9	Bruce's Castle	455	4	18	Ailsa Hame ^	431	4
Out		3,455	35	In		3,420	35
Source:				Total		6,875	70

^ The 18th hole was renamed "Duel in the Sun" in 2003.

== Round summaries ==
=== First round ===
Wednesday, 6 July 1977

Place	Player	Score	To par
1	(United States) John Schroeder	66	−4
2	(England) Martin Foster	67	−3
T3	(United States) Jack Nicklaus	68	−2
T3	(United States) Lee Trevino	68	−2
T3	(United States) Tom Watson	68	−2
T6	(Spain) Seve Ballesteros	69	−1
T6	(United States) Gaylord Burrows	69	−1
T6	(United States) Johnny Miller	69	−1
T9	(United States) George Burns	70	E
T9	(United States) Raymond Floyd	70	E
T9	(England) Tommy Horton	70	E
T9	(Taiwan) Hsu Chi-san	70	E
T9	(United States) Hale Irwin	70	E
T9	(Australia) Ian Stanley	70	E

=== Second round ===
Thursday, 7 July 1977

Place	Player	Score	To par
1	(United States) Roger Maltbie	71-66=137	−3
T2	(United States) Hubert Green	72-66=138	−2
T2	(United States) Jack Nicklaus	68-70=138	−2
T2	(United States) Lee Trevino	68-70=138	−2
T2	(United States) Tom Watson	68-70=138	−2
T6	(England) Peter Butler	71-68=139	−1
T6	(United States) Mark Hayes	76-63=139	−1
T8	(Spain) Seve Ballesteros	69-71=140	E
T8	(United States) George Burns	70-70=140	E
T8	(England) Howard Clark	72-68=140	E
T8	(United States) Ben Crenshaw	71-69=140	E
T8	(Taiwan) Hsu Chi-san	70-70=140	E
T8	(United States) John Schroeder	66-74=140	E

Amateurs: Garner (+13), McEvoy (+13), Powell (+13), Carrick (+15), Lyle (+15), Pierse (+16), Wilson (+16), Cosh (+21), Chapman (+25).

=== Third round ===
Friday, 8 July 1977

Place	Player	Score	To par
T1	(United States) Jack Nicklaus	68-70-65=203	−7
T1	(United States) Tom Watson	68-70-65=203	−7
3	(United States) Ben Crenshaw	71-69-66=206	−4
T4	(England) Tommy Horton	70-74-65=209	−1
T4	(United States) Gaylord Burrows	69-72-68=209	−1
T4	(United States) Roger Maltbie	71-66-72=209	−1
T7	(United States) Johnny Miller	69-74-67=210	E
T7	(United States) Lee Trevino	68-70-72=210	E
T9	(United States) Raymond Floyd	70-73-68=211	+1
T9	(United States) Mark Hayes	76-63-72=211	+1

=== Final round ===
Saturday, 9 July 1977

Place	Player	Score	To par	Money (£)
1	(United States) Tom Watson	68-70-65-65=268	−12	10,000
2	(United States) Jack Nicklaus	68-70-65-66=269	−11	8,000
3	(United States) Hubert Green	72-66-74-67=279	−1	6,000
4	(United States) Lee Trevino	68-70-72-70=280	E	5,000
T5	(United States) George Burns	70-70-72-69=281	+1	4,250
T5	(United States) Ben Crenshaw	71-69-66-75=281	+1	4,250
7	(United States) Arnold Palmer	73-73-67-69=282	+2	3,750
8	(United States) Raymond Floyd	70-73-68-72=283	+3	3,500
T9	(United States) John Schroeder	66-74-73-71=284	+4	2,875
T9	(United States) Mark Hayes	76-63-72-73=284	+4	2,875
T9	(United States) Johnny Miller	69-74-67-74=284	+4	2,875
T9	(England) Tommy Horton	70-74-65-75=284	+4	2,875

- The exchange rate at the time was approximately 1.72 dollars (US) per pound sterling.

==== Scorecard ====
Final round

Hole	1	2	3	4	5	6	7	8	9	10	11	12	13	14	15	16	17	18
Par	4	4	4	3	4	3	5	4	4	4	3	4	4	4	3	4	5	4
(United States) Watson	−7	−6	−6	−6	−7	−7	−8	−9	−8	−8	−8	−8	−9	−9	−10	−10	−11	−12
(United States) Nicklaus	−7	−8	−8	−9	−9	−9	−9	−9	−9	−9	−9	−10	−10	−10	−10	−10	−10	−11
(United States) Green	+2	+1	+1	+1	E	E	E	E	−1	−1	−1	−1	E	E	E	E	−1	−1

Cumulative tournament scores, relative to par

Birdie	Bogey
