= Senior major golf championships =

Major professional golf tournaments for men over 50

Men's professional senior golf is for players aged 50 and above. Golf differs from all other sports in having lucrative competitions for this age group. The leading senior tour is the U.S.-based PGA Tour Champions, which was established in 1980 (as the Senior PGA Tour). It has established a roster of five major championships. These events are all played over four rounds, whereas other senior tournaments are generally played over three rounds—only one other current Champions Tour event, the limited-field and season-ending Charles Schwab Cup Championship, is played over four rounds. A golfer's performances can be quite variable from one round to the next, so playing an extra round increases the likelihood that the senior majors will be won by leading players.

In the current order of play, the senior majors are:

- Senior PGA Championship (founded 1937; Champions Tour major since 1980) – Mid April
- The Tradition (Champions Tour major since foundation in 1989) – Early May
- U.S. Senior Open (Champions Tour major since foundation in 1980) – Early July
- Senior Players Championship (Champions Tour major since foundation in 1983) – Mid July
- The Senior Open Championship (often called the "Senior British Open" outside the UK; founded 1987; Champions Tour major since 2003) – Late July

The Senior PGA Championship, U.S. Senior Open, and Senior Open Championship, have fields of 144 to 156 players and a 36-hole cut. The Tradition and Senior Players Championship have 81 player fields and no 36-hole cut.

The order of play has changed many times during the history of senior golf, especially since 2006:

- In 2006 the U.S. Senior Open, Senior Players Championship, and Senior Open were held in July and were consecutive on the schedule. There was no event in the week after the Senior Players, allowing golfers adequate time to travel to the United Kingdom and acclimate for the Senior Open two weeks later. This gave the Champions Tour a very clear peak period, which is not found on most other tours, including the PGA Tour. The Tradition was the last major on the schedule.
- In 2007 the Senior Players Championship moved to October, two months after The Tradition, to spread the majors over a longer period of time.
- In 2008, the U.S. Senior Open moved to the week after the Senior Open. This once again gave the Champions Tour a clear peak period, with no tournament held between the U.S. Senior Open and The Tradition (a one-week break in 2008, two weeks in 2009). In 2010, there was a regular tournament in the week after the U.S. Senior Open, followed by a one-week break before The Tradition.
- The 2011 season saw another significant schedule change. The Tradition moved from late August to early May, becoming the first major of the season. The Senior Players Championship moved from October to the August date vacated by The Tradition.
- In 2012, the order was almost completely reshuffled. The schedule was also greatly compressed, with all five majors now being played in a two-month period:
  - The Senior PGA Championship remained at its end of May slot.
  - The Tradition moved from early May to mid-June.
  - The Senior Players Championship, formerly the last major of the season in August, moved to late June/early July
  - The U.S. Senior Open remains the fourth major in schedule order, but is now held in mid-July.
  - The Senior Open kept its 2011 date, but due to the other schedule changes is now the final major.

Unlike the mainstream majors, two of the senior majors have title sponsors, and the Senior PGA Championship and Senior Open have presenting sponsors whose names appear after the tournament title. Also unlike the mainstream majors, none of which falls under the direct jurisdiction of any professional tour, the Champions Tour directly operates two of its majors—The Tradition and the Senior Players Championship. The other three senior majors are operated by the same bodies that organize their mainstream counterparts—the PGA of America for the Senior PGA, The R&A for the Senior Open, and the USGA for the U.S. Senior Open.

The Senior PGA is by far the oldest of the senior majors, having commenced in the 1930s. The other four tournaments all date from 1980 or later, having been founded in the era when senior golf became a commercial success. This occurred when the first big golf stars of the television era, men such as Arnold Palmer and Gary Player, began to reach the relevant age.

Unlike mainstream men's golf, the senior game does not have a globally agreed set of majors. The three majors recognized by the European Senior Tour are the Senior PGA Championship and the U.S. and British Senior Opens. However, the Champions Tour is much more dominant in global senior golf than the PGA Tour is in mainstream men's golf.

== Senior major winners ==
The table below shows the results of all the events designated as majors by the Champions Tour. As the order in which the majors were played frequently changes, they are listed in the current order of play. Winners of Senior PGA Championships played before December 1979 (from the 1980 to 1983 seasons, and again in the 1985 season, it was the winner of the Senior PGA Championship in December of the previous calendar year) and Senior Opens played before 2003 are not listed here as they were not Champions Tour majors at the time nor retroactively recognized as majors. Those winners are shown in the tournaments' articles. The other three tournaments have been Champions Tour majors throughout their existence. Because of the time the Senior PGA Championship was held from 1979-82 and again in 1984 as a December tournament, December playings of the tournament are regarded as wraparound seasons for the subsequent year.

Bernhard Langer holds the record for the most senior majors won with twelve. Gary Player has also won nine championships that are now considered senior golf majors, but three of his titles came at the Senior Open Championship before this tournament officially gained senior major status. Jack Nicklaus has won eight senior majors and holds the record for the most regular majors won (18).

Bernhard Langer is the only player to have won each of the five current senior major championships and is therefore held to have won the current 'Career Grand Slam.' In his time, Nicklaus also held a 'Career Grand Slam', as the Senior Open did not become the fifth senior major until 2003, by which time Nicklaus had effectively retired from senior golf, his only appearance in the Senior Open being in 2003.

Year	The Tradition	Senior PGA Championship (Note: The 1979 to 1982, and the December 1984, Senior PGA Championships are regarded as the championship of the subsequent season.)	U.S. Senior Open	Senior Players Championship	The Senior Open Championship (Note: Editions before 2003 were not considered to be a 'Champions Tour' major, subsequently were unofficial wins. Since 2018, all pre-2003 editions have been considered to be senior major championships and are official wins on the tour.)
2026	(United States) Stewart Cink (2/2)	(United States) Stewart Cink (1/2)	(Republic of Ireland) Pádraig Harrington (4/4)	(United States) Zach Johnson	(United States) Jerry Kelly (3/3)
2025	(Argentina) Ángel Cabrera (1/2)	(Argentina) Ángel Cabrera (2/2)	(Republic of Ireland) Pádraig Harrington (2/4)	(Spain) Miguel Ángel Jiménez (3/3)	(Republic of Ireland) Pádraig Harrington (3/4)
2024	(United States) Doug Barron	(England) Richard Bland (1/2)	(England) Richard Bland (2/2)	(South Africa) Ernie Els	(South Korea) K. J. Choi
2023	(United States) Steve Stricker (5/7)	(United States) Steve Stricker (6/7)	(Germany) Bernhard Langer (12/12)	(United States) Steve Stricker (7/7)	(Germany) Alex Čejka (3/3)
2022	(United States) Steve Stricker (4/7)	(New Zealand) Steven Alker	(Republic of Ireland) Pádraig Harrington (1/4)	(United States) Jerry Kelly (2/3)	(Northern Ireland) Darren Clarke
2021	(Germany) Alex Čejka (1/3)	(Germany) Alex Čejka (2/3)	(United States) Jim Furyk	(United States) Steve Stricker (3/7)	(Wales) Stephen Dodd
2020	Canceled (Note: Canceled due to the COVID-19 pandemic.)	Canceled	Canceled	(United States) Jerry Kelly (1/3)	Canceled
2019	(United States) Steve Stricker (1/7)	(United States) Ken Tanigawa	(United States) Steve Stricker (2/7)	(South Africa) Retief Goosen	(Germany) Bernhard Langer (11/12)
2018	(Spain) Miguel Ángel Jiménez (1/3)	(England) Paul Broadhurst (2/2)	(United States) David Toms	(Fiji) Vijay Singh	(Spain) Miguel Ángel Jiménez (2/3)
2017	(Germany) Bernhard Langer (8/12)	(Germany) Bernhard Langer (9/12)	(United States) Kenny Perry (4/4)	(United States) Scott McCarron	(Germany) Bernhard Langer (10/12)
2016	(Germany) Bernhard Langer (6/12)	(United States) Rocco Mediate	(United States) Gene Sauers	(Germany) Bernhard Langer (7/12)	(England) Paul Broadhurst (1/2)
2015	(United States) Jeff Maggert (1/2)	(Scotland) Colin Montgomerie (3/3)	(United States) Jeff Maggert (2/2)	(Germany) Bernhard Langer (5/12)	(United States) Marco Dawson
2014	(United States) Kenny Perry (3/4)	(Scotland) Colin Montgomerie (1/3)	(Scotland) Colin Montgomerie (2/3)	(Germany) Bernhard Langer (3/12)	(Germany) Bernhard Langer (4/12)
2013	(South Africa) David Frost	(Japan) Kōki Idoki	(United States) Kenny Perry (2/4)	(United States) Kenny Perry (1/4)	(United States) Mark Wiebe
2012	(United States) Tom Lehman (3/3)	(England) Roger Chapman (1/2)	(England) Roger Chapman (2/2)	(United States) Joe Daley	(United States) Fred Couples (2/2)
2011	(United States) Tom Lehman (2/3)	(United States) Tom Watson (6/6)	(United States) Olin Browne	(United States) Fred Couples (1/2)	(United States) Russ Cochran
2010	(United States) Fred Funk (3/3)	(United States) Tom Lehman (1/3)	(Germany) Bernhard Langer (2/12)	(United States) Mark O'Meara	(Germany) Bernhard Langer (1/12)
2009	(United States) Mike Reid (2/2)	(United States) Michael Allen	(United States) Fred Funk (2/3)	(United States) Jay Haas (3/3)	(United States) Loren Roberts (4/4)
2008	(United States) Fred Funk (1/3)	(United States) Jay Haas (2/3)	(Argentina) Eduardo Romero (2/2)	(United States) D. A. Weibring	(United States) Bruce Vaughan
2007	(Republic of Ireland) Mark McNulty	(Zimbabwe) Denis Watson	(United States) Brad Bryant	(United States) Loren Roberts (3/4)	(United States) Tom Watson (5/6)
2006	(Argentina) Eduardo Romero (1/2)	(United States) Jay Haas (1/3)	(United States) Allen Doyle (4/4)	(United States) Bobby Wadkins	(United States) Loren Roberts (2/4)
2005	(United States) Loren Roberts (1/4)	(United States) Mike Reid (1/2)	(United States) Allen Doyle (3/4)	(United States) Peter Jacobsen (2/2)	(United States) Tom Watson (4/6)
2004	(United States) Craig Stadler (2/2)	(United States) Hale Irwin (7/7)	(United States) Peter Jacobsen (1/2)	(England) Mark James	(United States) Pete Oakley
2003	(United States) Tom Watson (3/6)	(United States) John Jacobs	(United States) Bruce Lietzke	(United States) Craig Stadler (1/2)	(United States) Tom Watson (2/6)
2002	(United States) Jim Thorpe	(United States) Fuzzy Zoeller	(United States) Don Pooley	(Australia) Stewart Ginn	(Japan) Noboru Sugai
2001	(United States) Doug Tewell (2/2)	(United States) Tom Watson (1/6)	(United States) Bruce Fleisher	(United States) Allen Doyle (2/4)	(Australia) Ian Stanley
2000	(United States) Tom Kite	(United States) Doug Tewell (1/2)	(United States) Hale Irwin (6/7)	(United States) Raymond Floyd (4/4)	(Republic of Ireland) Christy O'Connor Jnr (2/2)
1999	(Australia) Graham Marsh (2/2)	(United States) Allen Doyle (1/4)	(United States) Dave Eichelberger	(United States) Hale Irwin (5/7)	(Republic of Ireland) Christy O'Connor Jnr (1/2)
1998	(United States) Gil Morgan (2/3)	(United States) Hale Irwin (3/7)	(United States) Hale Irwin (4/7)	(United States) Gil Morgan (3/3)	(Wales) Brian Huggett
1997	(United States) Gil Morgan (1/3)	(United States) Hale Irwin (2/7)	(Australia) Graham Marsh (1/2)	(United States) Larry Gilbert	(South Africa) Gary Player (9/9)
1996	(United States) Jack Nicklaus (8/8)	(United States) Hale Irwin (1/7)	(United States) Dave Stockton (3/3)	(United States) Raymond Floyd (3/4)	(Scotland) Brian Barnes (2/2)
1995	(United States) Jack Nicklaus (7/8)	(United States) Raymond Floyd (2/4)	(United States) Tom Weiskopf	(United States) J. C. Snead	(Scotland) Brian Barnes (1/2)
1994	(United States) Raymond Floyd (1/4)	(United States) Lee Trevino (4/4)	(South Africa) Simon Hobday	(United States) Dave Stockton (2/3)	(United States) Tom Wargo (2/2)
1993	(United States) Tom Shaw	(United States) Tom Wargo (1/2)	(United States) Jack Nicklaus (6/8)	(United States) Jim Colbert	(New Zealand) Bob Charles (2/2)
1992	(United States) Lee Trevino (3/4)	(United States) Lee Trevino (2/4)	(United States) Larry Laoretti	(United States) Dave Stockton (1/3)	(South Africa) John Fourie
1991	(United States) Jack Nicklaus (5/8)	(United States) Jack Nicklaus (3/8)	(United States) Jack Nicklaus (4/8)	(United States) Jim Albus	(South Africa) Bobby Verwey
1990	(United States) Jack Nicklaus (1/8)	(South Africa) Gary Player (7/9)	(United States) Lee Trevino (1/4)	(United States) Jack Nicklaus (2/8)	(South Africa) Gary Player (8/9)
1989	(United States) Don Bies	(United States) Larry Mowry	(United States) Orville Moody (1/2)	(United States) Orville Moody (2/2)	(New Zealand) Bob Charles (1/2)
1988	Not yet founded	(South Africa) Gary Player (4/9)	(South Africa) Gary Player (6/9)	(United States) Billy Casper (2/2)	(South Africa) Gary Player (5/9)
1987	Not yet founded	(United States) Chi-Chi Rodríguez (2/2)	(South Africa) Gary Player (2/9)	(South Africa) Gary Player (3/9)	(England) Neil Coles
1986	Not yet founded	(South Africa) Gary Player (1/9)	(United States) Dale Douglass	(United States) Chi-Chi Rodríguez (1/2)	Not yet founded
1985	Not yet founded	(Australia) Peter Thomson (Dec 84)	(United States) Miller Barber (5/5)	(United States) Arnold Palmer (5/5)	Not yet founded
1984	Not yet founded	(United States) Arnold Palmer (3/5) (Jan 84)	(United States) Miller Barber (4/5)	(United States) Arnold Palmer (4/5)	Not yet founded
1983	Not yet founded	(United States) Don January (2/2) (Dec 82)	(United States) Billy Casper (1/2)	(United States) Miller Barber (3/5)	Not yet founded
1982	Not yet founded	(United States) Miller Barber (1/5) (Dec 81)	(United States) Miller Barber (2/5)	Not yet founded	Not yet founded
1981	Not yet founded	(United States) Arnold Palmer (1/5) (Dec 80)	(United States) Arnold Palmer (2/5)	Not yet founded	Not yet founded
1980	Not yet founded	(United States) Don January (1/2) (Dec 79)	(Argentina) Roberto De Vicenzo	Not yet founded	Not yet founded

Note: The Senior PGA Championship was held in December from 1979 to 1984, with one exception. For consistency reasons of golf seasons, which at times have been wraparound seasons before the tournament moved to late May, December tournament of the Senior PGA Championship are regarded as the following year's season.

== By country ==
Senior major championship winning golfers by country
Country	The Tradition	Senior PGA Championship	U.S. Senior Open	Senior Players Championship	Senior Open Championship	Total
United States	28	31	32	34	13	138
Germany	3	2	2	3	5	15
South Africa	1	3	3	3	5	15
England	0	3	2	1	2	8
Ireland	1	0	3	0	3	7
Argentina	2	1	2	0	0	5
Australia	1	1	1	1	1	5
Scotland	0	2	1	0	2	5
New Zealand	0	1	0	0	2	3
Spain	1	0	0	1	1	3
Japan	0	1	0	0	1	2
Wales	0	0	0	0	2	2
Fiji	0	0	0	1	0	1
Northern Ireland	0	0	0	0	1	1
South Korea	0	0	0	0	1	1
Zimbabwe	0	1	0	0	0	1

== See also ==
- List of Champions Tour major championship winning golfers
