= 1994 Senior British Open =

Tournament information
- Dates: 20–23 July 1994
- Location: Lytham St Annes, England, United Kingdom; 53.7496°N 3.0178°W
- Course: Royal Lytham & St Annes Golf Club
- Organised by: The R&A
- Tours: European Seniors Tour; Senior PGA Tour
- Format: 72 holes stroke play

Statistics
- Par: 72
- Field: 133 players, 65 after cut
- Cut: 152 (+8)
- Prize fund: €220,000
- Winner's share: €51,310

Champion
- (United States) Tom Wargo
- 280 (−8)
- Location in Europe Location in the United Kingdom Location in England Location in the Borough of Fylde Location in Lytham St Annes

The 1994 Senior British Open was a professional golf tournament for players aged 50 and above and the eighth British Senior Open Championship, held from 20 to 23 July at Royal Lytham & St Annes Golf Club in Lytham St Annes, Lancashire, England, United Kingdom.

In 2018, the tournament was, as all Senior British Open Championships played 1987–2002, retroactively recognized as a senior major golf championship and a PGA Tour Champions (at the time named the Senior PGA Tour) event.

Tom Wargo won by two strokes over defending champion Bob Charles and Doug Dalziel to win his first Senior British Open title and second senior major championship victory.

== Venue ==
The event was the fourth Senior Open Championship in a row held at Royal Lytham & St Annes Golf Club.

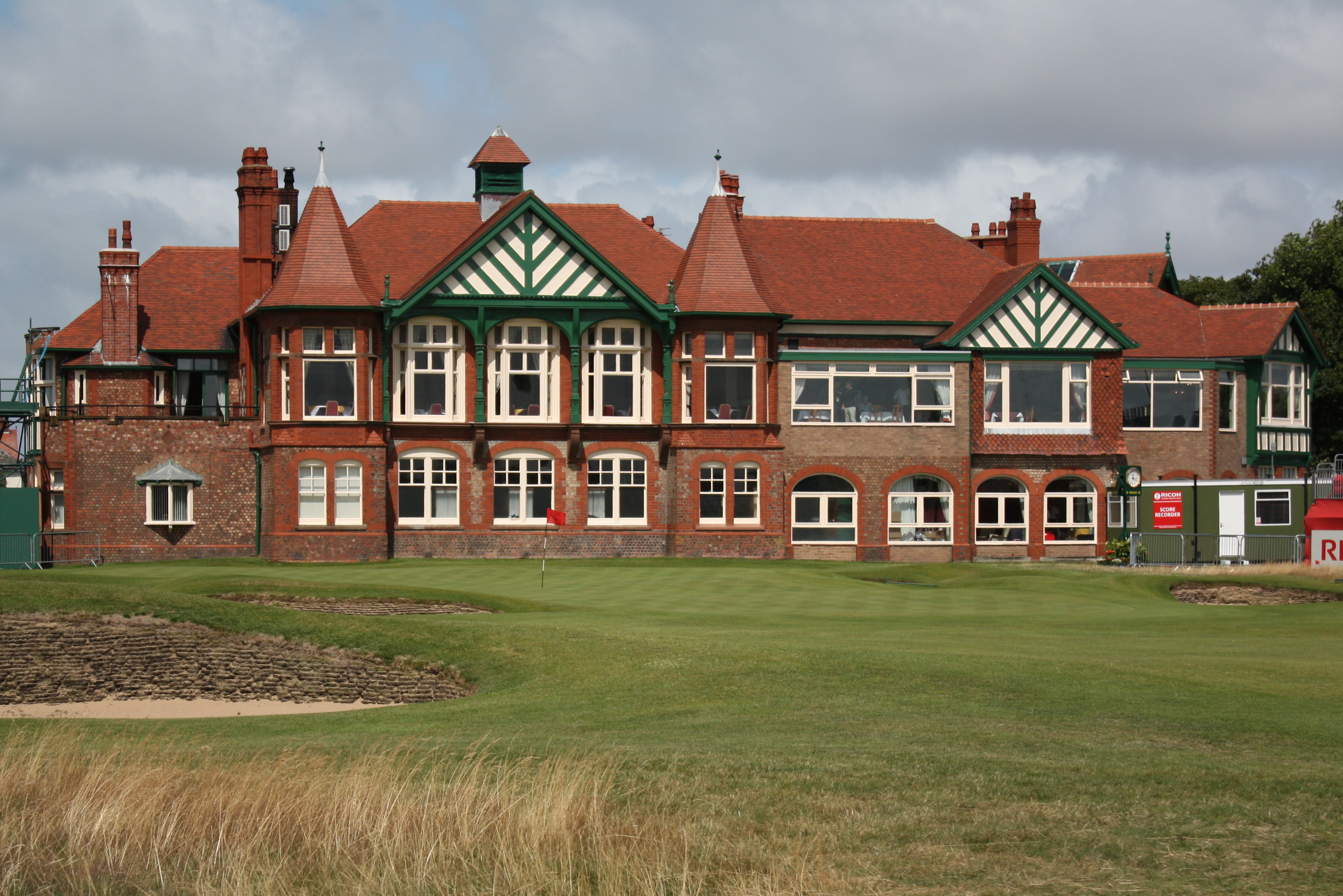
Royal Lytham & St Annes GC clubhouse

== Field ==
123 players entered the competition. Two of them withdrew and two were disqualified. 66 players, all of them professionals, no amateurs, made the 36-hole cut.

=== Past champions in the field ===
All five past Senior British Open champions participated. All of them made the 36-hole cut, Bob Charles (tied 2nd), Gary Player (tied 4th), Bobby Verway (tied 11th), John Fourie (tied 16th) and Neil Coles (tied 31st).

=== Past winners and runners-up at The Open Championship in the field ===
The field included four former winners of The Open Championship. Three of them made the cut, Bob Charles (tied 2nd), Gary Player (tied 4th) and Arnold Palmer (tied 6th). Tony Jacklin was disqualified.

The field also included three former runners-up at The Open Championship; Brian Huggett (tied 4th), Christy O'Connor Snr (tied 11th) and Neil Coles (tied 31st).

== Final results ==
Sunday, 23 July 1994

Place	Player	Score	To par	Money (€)
1	(United States) Tom Wargo	73-68-68-71=280	−8	51,310
T2	(New Zealand) Bob Charles	70-69-72-71=282	−6	26,467
T2	(United States) Doug Dalziel	75-66-71-70=282	−6	26,467
T4	(Wales) Brian Huggett	78-68-70-71=287	−1	14,231
T4	(South Africa) Gary Player	73-69-71-74=287	−1	14,231
T6	(England) John Morgan	71-73-71-73=288	E	10,010
T6	(United States) Arnold Palmer	69-74-71-74=288	E	10,010
8	(England) Tommy Horton	71-72-71-75=289	+1	7,700
T9	(Australia) Bill Dunk	73-69-74-74=290	+2	6,531
T9	(Republic of Ireland) Liam Higgins	69-75-76-70=290	+2	6,531

Preceded by 1994 U.S. Senior Open	Senior Major Championships	Succeeded by 1995 The Tradition
