= 1999 Senior British Open =

Tournament information
- Dates: 22–25 July 1999
- Location: Portrush, County Antrim, Northern Ireland, United Kingdom; 55.200°N 6.635°W
- Courses: Royal Portrush Golf Club; Dunluce Links
- Organised by: The R&A
- Tours: European Senior Tour; Senior PGA Tour
- Format: 72 holes stroke play

Statistics
- Par: 72
- Length: 6,690 yd (6,120 m)
- Field: 123 players, 63 after cut
- Cut: 155 (+11)
- Prize fund: €560,000
- Winner's share: €88,620

Champion
- (Republic of Ireland) Christy O'Connor Jnr
- 282 (−6)
- Location in Europe Location in the United Kingdom Location in Ireland Location in Northern Ireland

The 1999 Senior British Open was a professional golf tournament for players aged 50 and above and the 13th British Senior Open Championship, held from 22 to 25 July at Royal Portrush Golf Club in Portrush, County Antrim, Northern Ireland, United Kingdom.

In 2018, the tournament was, as were all Senior British Open Championships played 1987–2002, retroactively recognized as a senior major golf championship and a PGA Tour Champions (at the time named the Senior PGA Tour) event.

Christy O'Connor Jnr beat John Bland by three strokes and won his first of two Senior British Open titles.

Defending champion Brian Huggett finished tied 20th, 15 strokes from the back. Leading amateur was Roy Smethurst, tied 30th, 18 strokes from the winner.

== Venue ==
The event was the fifth Senior Open Championship in a row held at Royal Portrush Golf Club.

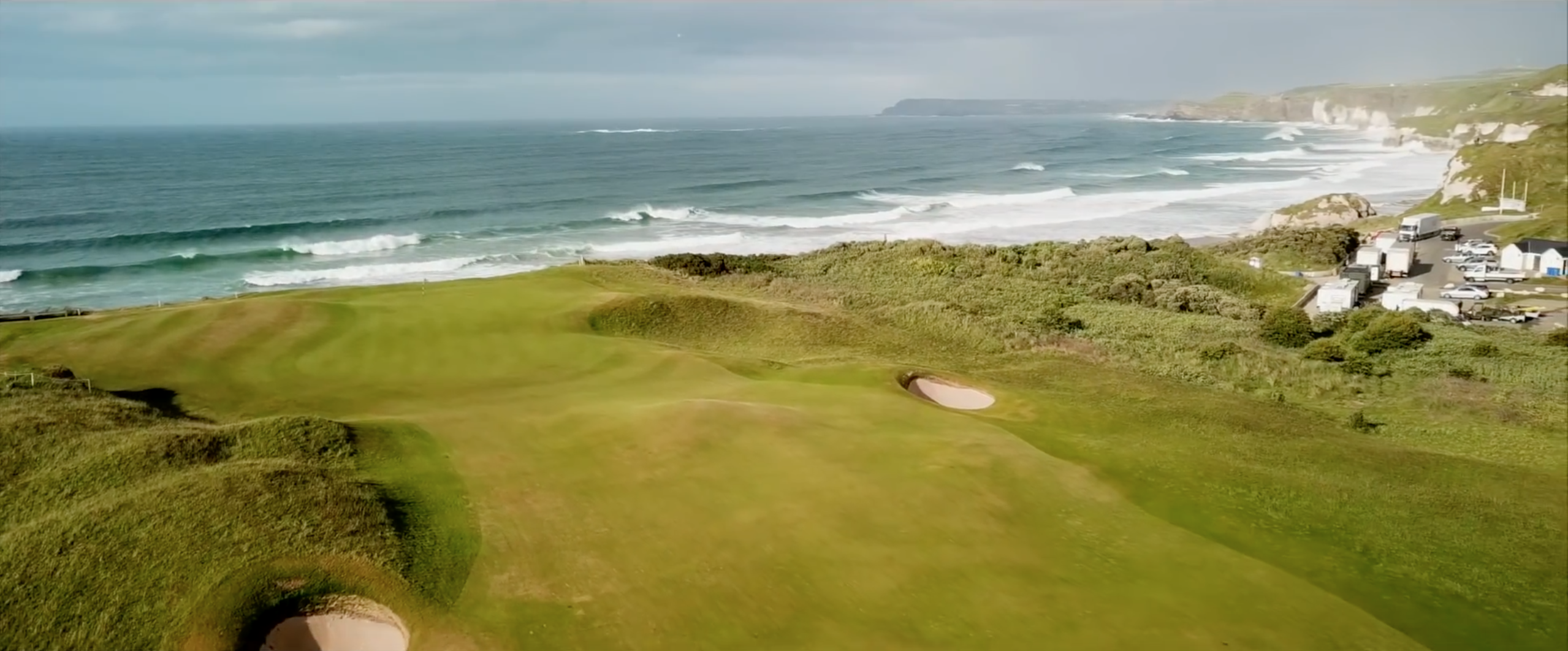
Royal Portrush GC 5th hole

=== Course layout ===
Name	Hole	Par	Yards
Hughie's	1	4	371
Giant's Grave	2	5	493
Islay	3	3	159
Fred Daly's	4	4	442
White Rocks	5	4	384
Harry Colt's	6	3	192
P.G. Stevenson's	7	4	420
Himalayas	8	4	377
Tavern	9	5	478
Dhu Varren	10	5	480
Feather Bed	11	3	166
Causeway	12	4	389
Skerries	13	4	371
Calamity Corner	14	3	205
Purgatory	15	4	366
Babington's	16	4	414
Glenarm	17	5	527
Greenaway	18	4	456
	Out	36	3,316
	In	36	3,374
	Total	72	6,690

== Field ==
123 players, 113 professionals and 10 amateurs, entered the competition.

55 players qualified through two 18-hole final qualifying tournaments, 26 players at Royal Portrusch Valley Links course and 29 players at nearby Castlerock Golf Club. They joined 68 players, who were exempt into the championship.

Five players withdraw and one was disqualified. 63 players made the 36-hole cut.

=== Past champions in the field ===
Seven past Senior British Open champions participated. Six of them made the 36-hole cut, Gary Player (3rd), Bob Charles (tied 5th), Brian Huggett (tied 20th), Brian Barnes (tied 27th), Neil Coles (tied 27th) and John Fourie (tied 30th). One of them, Bobby Verwey, withdraw.

=== Past winners and runners-up at The Open Championship in the field ===
The field included three former winners of The Open Championship, Bob Charles (tied 5th), Gary Player (3rd) and Tony Jacklin (missed cut).

The field also included three former runners-up at The Open Championship; Brian Huggett (tied 20th), Neil Coles (tied 27th) and Christy O'Connor Snr (missed the cut).

== Final results ==
Sunday, 25 July 1999

Place	Player	Score	To par	Money (€)
1	(Republic of Ireland) Christy O'Connor Jnr	76-69-68-69=282	−6	88,620
2	(South Africa) John Bland	73-71-71-70=285	−3	56,420
3	(South Africa) Gary Player	74-74-66-72=286	−2	32,788
4	(England) John Morgan	71-74-70-72=287	−1	26,600
5	(New Zealand) Bob Charles	72-73-67-77=289	+1	20,720
5	(Australia) Stewart Ginn	72-71-76-70=289	+1	20,720
7	(United States) David Oakley	70-71-73-77=291	+3	18,200
8	(Spain) Antonio Garrido	71-77-77-73=292	+4	16,800
T9	(United States) Jerry Bruner	75-76-72-70=293	+5	14,046
T9	(England) Tommy Horton	78-73-71-71=293	+5	14,046
T9	(Northern Ireland) David Jones	80-70-72-71=293	+5	14,046

Preceded by 1999 Ford Senior Players Championship	Senior Major Championships	Succeeded by 2000 Senior PGA Championship
