= 1998 Senior British Open =

Tournament information
- Dates: 6–9 August 1998
- Location: Portrush, County Antrim, Northern Ireland, United Kingdom; 55.200°N 6.635°W
- Courses: Royal Portrush Golf Club; Dunluce Links
- Organised by: The R&A
- Tours: European Seniors Tour; Senior PGA Tour
- Format: 72 holes stroke play

Statistics
- Par: 72
- Length: 6,690 yd (6,120 m)
- Field: 113 players, 61 after cut
- Cut: 152 (+8)
- Prize fund: €372,903
- Winner's share: €84,000

Champion
- (Wales) Brian Huggett
- 283 (−5)
- Location in Europe Location in the United Kingdom Location in Ireland Location in Northern Ireland

The 1998 Senior British Open was a professional golf tournament for players aged 50 and above and the 12th British Senior Open Championship, held from 6 to 9 August at Royal Portrush Golf Club in Portrush, County Antrim, Northern Ireland, United Kingdom.

In 2018, the tournament was, as all Senior British Open Championships played 1987–2002, retroactively recognized as a senior major golf championship and a PGA Tour Champions (at the time named the Senior PGA Tour) event.

Brian Huggett won in a playoff over Eddie Polland to win his first Senior British Open title and first senior major championship victory.

== Venue ==
The event was the fourth Senior Open Championship in a row held at Royal Portrush Golf Club.

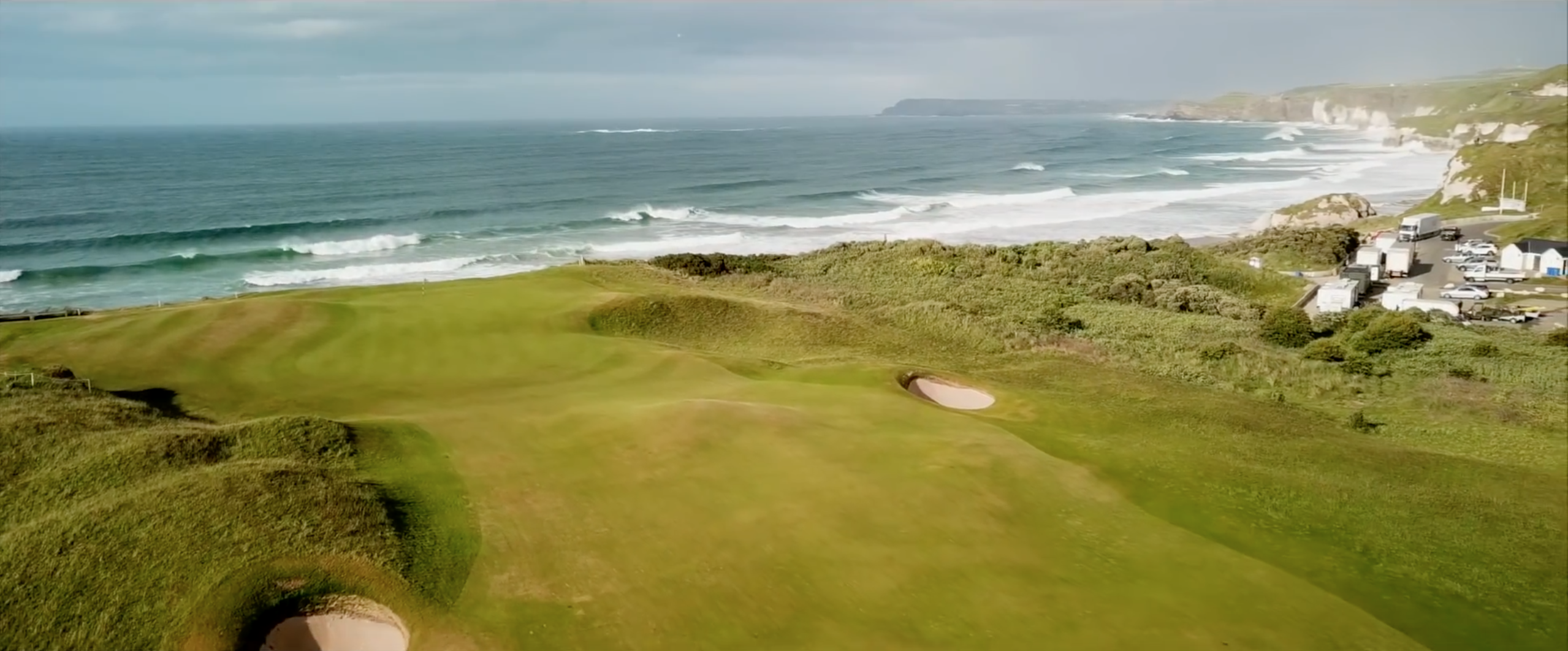
Royal Portrush GC 5th hole

== Field ==
113 professionals, no amateurs, entered the competition. One of them withdraw and one was disqualified. 61 players made the 36-hole cut.

=== Past champions in the field ===
Six past Senior British Open champions participated. All of them made the 36-hole cut.

Player	Country	Year(s) won	R1	R2	R3	R4	Total	To par	Finish
Brian Barnes	England	1995, 1996	70	73	68	73	284	−4	3
Bob Charles	New Zealand	1989, 1993	75	73	73	70	291	+3	T9
Gary Player	South Africa	1988, 1990, 1997	70	75	72	75	292	+4	T12
Neil Coles	England	1987	74	74	73	73	294	+6	T21
Bobby Verwey	South Africa	1991	73	73	75	77	298	+10	T32
John Fourie	South Africa	1992	75	74	75	77	301	+13	T47

=== Past winners and runners-up at The Open Championship in the field ===
The field included three former winners of The Open Championship, Bob Charles (tied 9th), Gary Player (tied 12th) and Tony Jacklin (missed cut).

The field also included three former runners-up at The Open Championship; Brian Huggett (won), Neil Coles (tied 21st) and Christy O'Connor Snr (tied 41st).

== Final round and playoff summaries ==
=== Final round ===
Sunday, 9 August 1998

Brian Huggett and Eddie Polland tied the lead after the fourth round, to meet in a sudden death playoff, to decide the winner. Brian Barnes birdied the 15th and 17th holes to move within a shot of the leaders and had a 20-foot putt on the 18th green to tie, but missed and finished a shot from the playoff. Defending champion Gary Player finished tied 12th nine shots behind the leaders.

Place	Player	Score	To par	Money (€)
T1	(Wales) Brian Huggett	71-70-71-71=283	−5	Playoff
T1	(Northern Ireland) Eddie Polland	71-71-71-70=283	−5	Playoff
3	(Scotland) Brian Barnes	70-73-68-73=284	−4	30,800
4	(Australia) Noel Ratcliffe	74-71-71-69=285	−3	25,202
T5	(Australia) Terry Gale	70-70-75-71=286	−2	18,165
T5	(England) Malcolm Gregson	76-71-72-67=286	−2	18,165
T5	(England) Tommy Horton	72-68-69-77=286	−2	18,165
T5	(Republic of Ireland) Denis O'Sullivan	71-73-71-71=286	−2	18,165
T9	(New Zealand) Bob Charles	75-73-73-70=291	+3	13,580
T9	(Northern Ireland) David Jones	69-77-71-74=291	+3	13,580
T9	(Northern Ireland) Paul Leonard	72-74-70-75=291	+3	13,580

=== Playoff ===
Sunday, 9 August 1998

The sudden-death playoff went on the par-4 18th hole, to be played until one of the players had a lower score on the hole than the other. 61-year-old Brian Huggett beat Eddie Polland with a par at the first extra hole. Polland missed the green on the right side with his second shot and, after chipping in to the green, missed his putt from nine feet.

Place	Player	Score	To par	Money (€)
1	(Wales) Brian Huggett	4	E	84,000
2	(Northern Ireland) Eddie Polland	5	+1	53,200

Preceded by 1998 U.S. Senior Open	Senior Major Championships	Succeeded by 1999 Senior PGA Championship
