= 1992 Senior British Open =

Tournament information
- Dates: 23–26 July 1992
- Location: Lytham St Annes, England, United Kingdom; 53.7496°N 3.0178°W
- Course: Royal Lytham & St Annes Golf Club
- Organised by: The R&A
- Tours: European Seniors Tour; Senior PGA Tour
- Format: 72 holes stroke play

Statistics
- Par: 71
- Length: 6,673 yards (6,102 m)
- Field: 123 players, 50 after cut
- Cut: 152 (+10)
- Prize fund: €200,000
- Winner's share: €46,657 £33,330

Champion
- (South Africa) John Fourie
- 282 (-2)
- Location in Europe Location in the United Kingdom Location in England Location in the Borough of Fylde Location in Lytham St Annes

The 1992 Senior British Open was a professional golf tournament for players aged 50 and above and the sixth Senior British Open, held from 23 to 26 July at Royal Lytham & St Annes Golf Club in Lytham St Annes, Lancashire, England, United Kingdom.

52-year-old John Fourie won by three strokes over Bob Charles and Neil Coles, to claim his first Senior British Open title and first senior major championship victory.

== Tours ==
1992 was the inaugural year of the European Senior Tour, later renamed the Legends Tour. The 1992 event was the first Senior British Open to be part of the tour schedule.

In 2018, the tournament was, as all Senior British Open Championships played 1987–2002, retroactively recognized as a senior major golf championship and an event on the PGA Tour Champions.

== Venue ==
The event was the second Senior Open Championship of four in a row held at Royal Lytham & St Annes Golf Club.

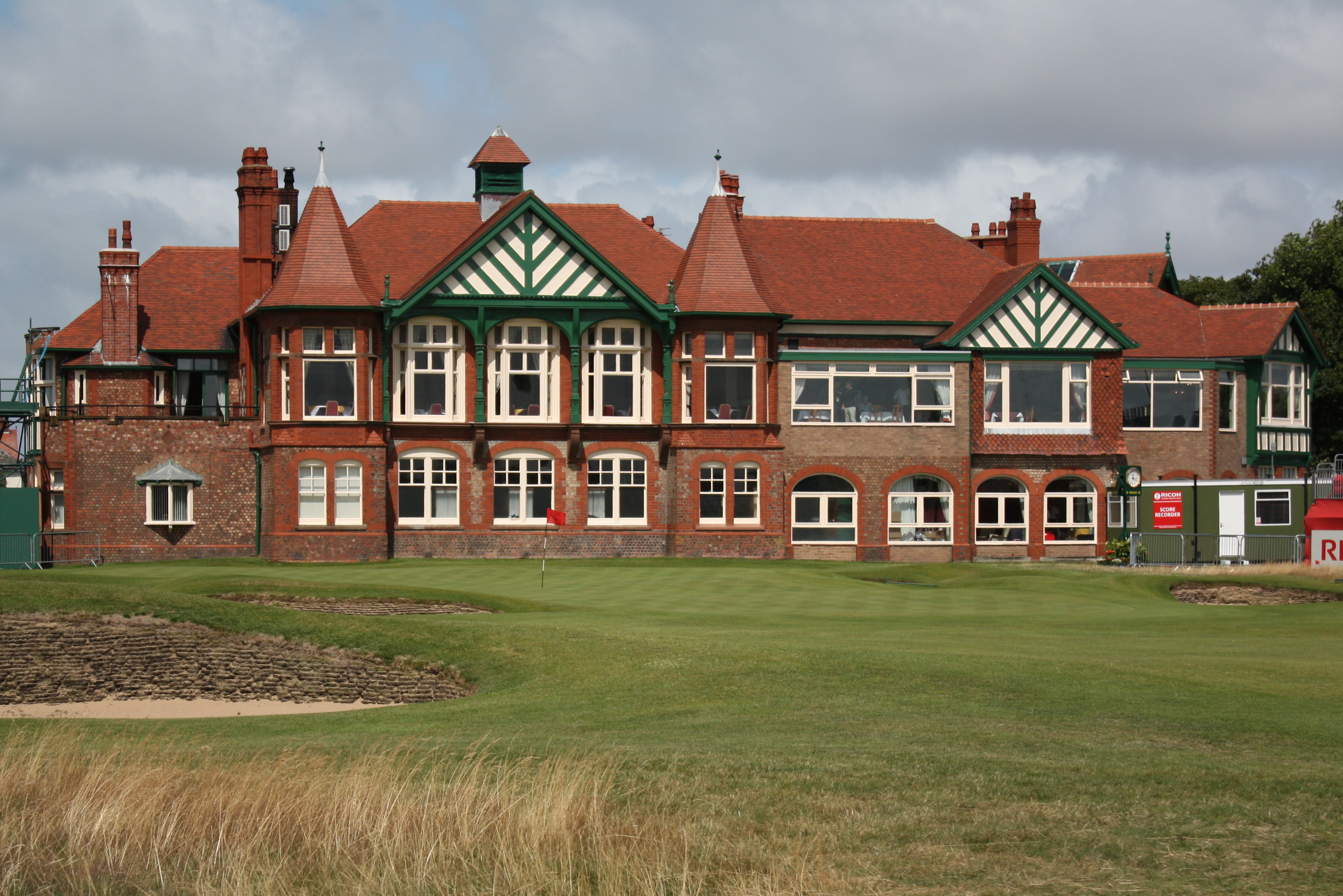
Royal Lytham & St Annes GC clubhouse

== Field ==
122 players entered the competition. Four players withdraw. 50 players, all of them professionals, made the 36-hole cut.

=== Past champions in the field ===
All four past Senior British Open champions participated. All of them made the 36-hole cut, 1989 champion Bob Charles (tied 2nd), 1987 champion Neil Coles (tied 2nd), 1988 and 1990 champion Gary Player (tied 7th) and 1991 champion Bobby Verway (tied 18th).

=== Past winners and runners-up at The Open Championship in the field ===
The field included three former winners of The Open Championship. All of them made the cut, 1963 Open champion Bob Charles (tied 2nd), 1959, 1968 and 1974 Open champion Gary Player (tied 7th) and 1961 and 1962 Open champion Arnold Palmer (tied 9th).

The field also included three former runners-up at The Open Championship. Neil Coles (tied 2nd), Christy O'Connor Snr (13th) and Brian Huggett (19th).

== Final results ==
Sunday, 26 July 1992

Place	Player	Score	To par	Money (£)
1	(South Africa) John Fourie	75-67-71-69=282	-2	33,330
T2	(New Zealand) Bob Charles	71-69-72-73=285	+1	17,360
T2	(England) Neil Coles	69-71-72-73=285	+1	17,360
4	(England) Peter Butler	70-71-72-73=286	+2	10,000
T5	(England) Tommy Horton	74-70-69-75=288	+4	7,360
T5	(Japan) Akio Toyoda	75-71-70-72=288	+4	7,360
T7	(South Africa) Simon Hobday	72-72-74-71=289	+5	5,500
T7	(South Africa) Gary Player	73-76-69-71=289	+5	5,500
T9	(United States) Arnold Palmer	70-72-72-76=290	+6	4,250
T9	(United States) Art Proctor	72-74-70-74=290	+6	4,250

Preceded by 1992 U.S. Senior Open	Senior Major Championships	Succeeded by 1993 The Tradition
