= 1966 PGA Tour Qualifying School graduates =

This is a list of the 1966 PGA Tour Qualifying School graduates. The tournament was played over 144 holes at the PGA National Golf Club in Palm Beach Gardens, Florida in late October. The tournament represented the totality of the year's PGA Tour Qualifying School; there were no local or regional sections.

== Tournament summary ==
There were 99 players in the tournament and 32 earned their tour cards. Harry Toscano was medalist with a 4-under-par 572. The professional Marty Bohen was well within the cut-off entering the final day. However, he played poorly and failed to graduate by one shot. "I was destroyed," Bohen said later in life.

In general, according to Billy Booe, PGA Tournament Administrator, this class "was considered substantially stronger" than the inaugural class from the previous year. A full year after qualifying school, 12 players were still playing full-time on the PGA Tour.

== List of graduates ==
Place	Player	Notes
1	(United States) Harry Toscano	
2	(Australia) Bob Stanton	Winner of 1966 Dunlop International
T3	(South Africa) Allan Henning	Winner of 1963 South African Open
T3	(United States) Jim Wiechers	Winner of 1966 Western Amateur
5	(United States) William Emmons	
6	(United States) Bob Lunn	Winner of 1963 U.S. Amateur Public Links
T7	(United States) Bert Greene	
T7	(United States) Richard Martinez	
T7	(United States) Jerry McGee	
T7	(United States) Jim McPhate	
11	(Canada) Wilf Homenuik	
12	(Puerto Rico) David Jimenez	Represented Puerto Rico for 1963 and 1964 Canada Cup
T13	(United States) Ettore Della Torre	
T13	(United States) Charles Lewis	
15	(United States) Bob Boldt	
T16	(United States) Ray Botts	
T16	(United States) Dave Eichelberger	Member of 1965 Walker Cup team
T18	(United States) Bruce Cudd	
T18	(United States) Sonny Methvin	
T20	(United States) John Mark Hopkins	
T20	(United States) John Joseph	
T20	(United States) Walt Zembriski	
T23	(United States) Dave Gumlia	
T23	(United States) Monty Kaser	Winner of 1966 U.S. Amateur Public Links
25	(United States) George Smith	
T26	(United States) Alex Antonio, Jr.	
T26	(United States) Don Headings	
T26	(United States) Roane Puett	
29	(United States) John Molenda	
T30	(Canada) Leon DeCaire	
T30	(United States) Rives McBee	
T30	(United States) DeWitt Weaver	
