= Christy O'Connor =

Christy O'Connor may refer to two Irish golfers:

- Christy O'Connor Snr (1924–2016)
- Christy O'Connor Jnr (1948–2016), his nephew
