= David Jimenez (golfer) =

Puerto Rican professional golfer

Personal information
- Nationality: Puerto Rico; United States
- Born: April 5, 1939 Puerto Rico
- Died: October 20, 2013 (aged 74) Savannah, Georgia, U.S.
- Spouses: Evelyn G. Jimenez, Arlene Patterson-Jimenez
- Children: Robin Jimenez Davis

Career
- Sport: Golf
- Status: Professional
- Former tours: PGA Tour; Asian Tour; European Senior Tour

Best results in major championships
- Masters Tournament: DNP
- PGA Championship: CUT: 1973, 1976, 1979, 1981
- U.S. Open: T57: 1966
- The Open Championship: DNP

David Jimenez (April 5, 1939 – October 20, 2013) was a Puerto Rican American professional golfer.

== Professional career ==
Jimenez was a native of Puerto Rico and played in the golf World Cup between 1963 and 1973. Jimenez earned playing privileges for the PGA Tour at 1966 PGA Tour Qualifying School. He was runner-up in the 1975 PGA Professional National Championship, losing in a playoff to Roger Watson. Later he represented the United States in the 1976 PGA Cup.

Jimenez was a regular player in the early years of the European Seniors Tour from its founding in 1992. He was twice runner-up: to Brian Huggett in the 1992 Northern Electric Seniors and to Tommy Horton in the 1993 Senior Zurich Lexus Trophy, losing both events in a playoff.

== Personal life ==
He died of Alzheimer's disease in 2013 at the age of 74.

== Playoff record ==
European Seniors Tour playoff record (0–2)

No.	Year	Tournament	Opponent(s)	Result
1	1992	Northern Electric Seniors	(Wales) Brian Huggett	Lost to par on first extra hole
2	1993	Gary Player Anvil Senior Classic	(South Africa) John Fourie, (England) Tommy Horton	Horton won with birdie on first extra hole

== Team appearances ==
- World Cup (representing Puerto Rico): 1963, 1964, 1967, 1968, 1972, 1973
- PGA Cup (representing the United States): 1976

== See also ==
- 1966 PGA Tour Qualifying School graduates
