= Shell Winter Tournament =

Tournament information
- Location: Weybridge, England (final)
- Established: 1967
- Course(s): St George's Hill Golf Club (final)
- Final year: 1968

Final champion
- Brian Huggett

The Shell Winter Tournament was an invitation professional golf tournament. The event consisted of a series of single round competitions, all played on Saturdays from 4 November to 9 December, with TV coverage on ITV's World of Sport. There were four qualifying rounds, two semi-finals and a final. The final was planned for 9 December but was postponed because of the foot-and-mouth outbreak and eventually played on 20 April 1968. The event was sponsored by the retail market division of Shell-Mex & BP.

== Format ==
First prize was £250 for the qualifying rounds, £500 for the semi-finals and £1,000 for the final. In addition there was an extra prize of £10, £20 or £40 for each stroke the winner finished ahead of the field.

Two qualifying rounds were played on 4 November with two more played on 11 November. 20 players competed in each event with the leading 9 advancing to the semi-final stage. The qualifying contest at Long Ashton was reduced to 14 holes because of bad weather. Ties for qualifying places were decided on the last nine holes.

The semi-finals were played on 11 and 18 November at Mere Golf Club, Mere, Cheshire and Whittington Heath Golf Club, Whittington, Staffordshire. Ten players qualified from each event. Brief coverage of the semi-finals was shown on ITV's World of Sport. Finlay Morris, who had competed at Mere, was killed in a road traffic accident returning home to Scotland.

The final was planned for 9 December at St George's Hill Golf Club, Weybridge, Surrey, but was postponed because of the foot-and-mouth outbreak and eventually played on 20 April 1968. There was again coverage on World of Sport. There were two rounds of 9 holes with lunch in between. The final was won by Brian Huggett with rounds of 35 and 33, a shot ahead of John Panton, who scored 34 and 35. Huggett won a total of £1,685, £125 in the qualifying round, £520 in the semi-final and £1,040 in the final.

== Winners ==
Date	Round	Winner(s)	Country	Venue	Score	Margin of victory	Runner(s)-up	Winner's share (£)	Ref
4 Nov 1967	Qualifying	Stuart Murray	Scotland	Hilton Park	69	1 stroke	(England) Fred Boobyer (England) Robin Davenport (England) Mel Hughes (Scotland) David Melville	250	
4 Nov 1967	Qualifying	Brian Waites	England	Long Ashton	53 (14)	Tie	(England) Neil Coles (England) Peter Green (England) Max Faulkner	250	
11 Nov 1967	Qualifying	Alex Caygill; Tony Grubb	England; England	Pannal	73	Tie		Shared 250 and 125	
11 Nov 1967	Qualifying	Peter Gill	England	Purdis Heath	69	2 strokes	(Wales) Brian Huggett	250	
18 Nov 1967	Semi-final	Eric Brown; Gordon Cunningham	Scotland; Scotland	Mere	72	Tie		Shared 500 and 250	
25 Nov 1967	Semi-final	Brian Huggett	Wales	Whittington Heath	68	1 stroke	(England) Keith MacDonald	500	
20 Apr 1968	Final	Brian Huggett	Wales	St George's Hill	68	1 stroke	(Scotland) John Panton	1000	
