= 1985 Open Championship =

Coordinates: 51.274°N 1.367°E

- Front cover of the 1985 Open Annual

Tournament information
- Dates: 18–21 July 1985
- Location: Sandwich, England
- Course: Royal St George's Golf Club
- Tour(s): European Tour; PGA Tour

Statistics
- Par: 70
- Length: 6,857 yards (6,270 m)
- Field: 153 players 86 after 1st cut 61 after 2nd cut
- Cut: 149 (+9) (1st cut); 221 (+11) (2nd cut)
- Prize fund: £530,000 $768,500
- Winner's share: £65,000 $94,250

Champion
- (Scotland) Sandy Lyle
- 282 (+2)

Location in England

The 1985 Open Championship was a men's major golf championship and the 114th Open Championship, held from 18 to 21 July at Royal St George's Golf Club in Sandwich, England. Sandy Lyle won his only Open Championship, one stroke ahead of runner-up Payne Stewart. It was the first of his two major titles; Lyle added a green jacket as Masters champion in 1988.

This was the last year the Open Championship featured the double cut (after 36 holes and 54 holes), introduced in 1968. Jack Nicklaus was cut for the first time in his Open championship career dating back to 1962.

== Course layout ==
Hole	1	2	3	4	5	6	7	8	9	Out	10	11	12	13	14	15	16	17	18	In	Total
Yards	445	376	214	470	422	156	529	415	387	3,414	399	216	362	443	508	467	165	425	458	3,443	6,857
Par	4	4	3	4	4	3	5	4	4	35	4	3	4	4	5	4	3	4	4	35	70

== Round summaries ==
=== First round ===
Thursday, 18 July 1985

Place	Player	Score	To par
1	(Republic of Ireland) Christy O'Connor Jnr	64	−6
T2	(Australia) David Graham	68	−2
T2	(Zimbabwe) Tony Johnstone	68	−2
T2	(England) Robert Lee	68	−2
T2	(Scotland) Sandy Lyle	68	−2
T2	(Wales) Philip Parkin	68	−2
T7	(Scotland) Gordon Brand Jnr	69	−1
T7	(Scotland) Bill McColl	69	−1
T7	(United States) D. A. Weibring	69	−1
T7	(England) David Whelan	69	−1
T7	(United States) Fuzzy Zoeller	69	−1

=== Second round ===
Friday, 19 July 1985

Place	Player	Score	To par
T1	(Australia) David Graham	68-71=139	−1
T1	(Scotland) Sandy Lyle	68-71=139	−1
T3	(Zimbabwe) Tony Johnstone	68-72=140	Even
T3	(Republic of Ireland) Christy O'Connor Jnr	64-76=140	Even
T3	(United States) D. A. Weibring	69-71=140	Even
T6	(England) Howard Clark	70-71=141	+1
T6	(West Germany) Bernhard Langer	72-69=141	+1
T6	(England) Robert Lee	68-73=141	+1
T6	(Australia) Wayne Riley	71-70=141	+1
T6	(Spain) Emilio Rodríguez	71-70=141	+1
T6	(Australia) Peter Senior	70-71=141	+1
T6	(Wales) Ian Woosnam	70-71=141	+1

Amateurs: Gilford (+6), Olazábal (+8), Evans (+15), Davis (+16) McGimpsey (+16), Homewood (+18), Purdie (+24), Latham (+28)

=== Third round ===
Saturday, 20 July 1985

Place	Player	Score	To par
T1	(Australia) David Graham	68-71-70=209	−1
T1	(West Germany) Bernhard Langer	72-69-68=209	−1
T3	(Scotland) Sandy Lyle	68-71-73=212	+2
T3	(Republic of Ireland) Christy O'Connor Jnr	64-76-72=212	+2
T3	(United States) Mark O'Meara	70-72-70=212	+2
T3	(Wales) Ian Woosnam	70-71-71=212	+2
T7	(United States) Peter Jacobsen	71-74-68=213	+3
T7	(United States) Tom Kite	73-73-67=213	+3
T9	(Australia) Greg Norman	71-72-71=214	+4
T9	(United States) D. A. Weibring	69-71-74=214	+4

Amateurs: Olazábal (+9), Gilford (+12).

=== Final round ===
Sunday, 21 July 1985

Place	Player	Score	To par	Money (£)
1	(Scotland) Sandy Lyle	68-71-73-70=282	+2	65,000
2	(United States) Payne Stewart	70-75-70-68=283	+3	43,000
T3	(Australia) David Graham	68-71-70-75=284	+4	23,600
T3	(West Germany) Bernhard Langer	72-69-68-75=284	+4	23,600
T3	(Republic of Ireland) Christy O'Connor Jnr	64-76-72-72=284	+4	23,600
T3	(United States) Mark O'Meara	70-72-70-72=284	+4	23,600
T3	(Spain) José Rivero	74-72-70-68=284	+4	23,600
T8	(Sweden) Anders Forsbrand	70-76-69-70=285	+5	15,567
T8	(United States) Tom Kite	73-73-67-72=285	+5	15,567
T8	(United States) D. A. Weibring	69-71-74-71=285	+5	15,567

Amateurs: Olazábal (+9)

- The exchange rate at the time was approximately 1.39 dollars (US) per pound sterling.
