= 1967 World Cup (men's golf) =

Coordinates: 19.280°N 99.158°W

Tournament information
- Dates: 9–12 November
- Location: Mexico City, Mexico
- Course: Club de Golf Mexico
- Format: 72 holes stroke play combined score

Statistics
- Par: 72
- Length: 7,250 yards (6,630 m)
- Field: 40 two-man teams
- Cut: None
- Prize fund: US$6,300
- Winner's share: $2,000 team $1,000 individual

Champion
- United States; Jack Nicklaus & Arnold Palmer
- 557 (−19)

The 1967 World Cup took place 9–12 November at the Club de Golf Mexico in Mexico City, Mexico. It was the 15th World Cup event, which was named the Canada Cup until 1966 and changed its name to the World Cup in 1967. The tournament was a 72-hole stroke play team event with 40 teams. Each team consisted of two players from a country. The combined score of each team determined the team results. The American team of Jack Nicklaus and Arnold Palmer won by 13 strokes over the New Zealand team of Bob Charles and Walter Godfrey. The individual competition was won by Palmer.

== Teams ==
Country	Players
Argentina	Fidel de Luca and Florentino Molina
Australia	Bruce Crampton and Alan Murray
Austria	Oswald Gertenmaier and Joseph Goricnik
Belgium	Donald Swaelens and Flory Van Donck
Brazil	José Maria Gonzalez and Mário Gonzalez
Canada	Al Balding and George Knudson
Chile	Francisco Cerda and Alberto Salas
China	Hsieh Yung-yo and Lu Liang-Huan
Colombia	Alfonso Bohórquez and Rogelio González
Czechoslovakia	Jiri Dvorak (a) and Jan Kunsta (a)
Denmark	Herluf Hansen and Jorgen Korfitzen
Egypt	Cherif El-Sayed Cherif and Mohamed Said Moussa
England	Peter Alliss and Malcolm Gregson
France	Roger Cotton and Jean Garaïalde
Guatemala	Roberto Galindo and Hilario Polo
Hawaii	Ted Makalena and James Ukauka
Ireland	Hugh Boyle and Christy O'Connor Snr
Italy	Oliva Bernardini and Roberto Bernardini
Jamaica	Jasper Markland and Seymour Rose
Japan	Mitsutaka Kono and Hideyo Sugimoto
Morocco	Mellouki M'Bareck and Benrokia Messoud
Mexico	Antonio Cerdá and Ricardo Casarez
Netherlands	Martin Roesink and André van Pinxten
New Zealand	Bob Charles and Walter Godfrey
Norway	Jan Aaseth (a) and Per Heidenreich (a)
Paraguay	Luis Boschian and Genaro Espínola
Peru	Bernabé Fajardo and Hugo Nari
Philippines	Ben Arda and Celestino Tugot
Portugal	Henrique Paulino and oaquin Rodriguez
Puerto Rico	David Jiménez and Chi-Chi Rodríguez
Scotland	Eric Brown and Harry Bannerman
South Africa	Harold Henning and Gary Player
Spain	Sebastián Miguel and Ramón Sota
Sweden	Åke Bergquist and Harry Karlsson-Fakt
Switzerland	Jacky Bonvin and Ernst Bauer
United States	Jack Nicklaus and Arnold Palmer
Uruguay	Jose Esmoris and Juan Sereda
Venezuela	Francisco González and Teobaldo Pérez
Wales	Dave Thomas and Sid Mouland
West Germany	Hans Jurgen Hoerenz and Toni Kugelmüller

(a) denotes amateur

== Scores ==
Team

Place	Country	Score	To par	Money (US$)
1	United States	140-141-140-136=557	−19	2,000
2	New Zealand	144-145-142-139=570	−6	1,000
3	Mexico	144-144-144-142=574	−2	800
4	South Africa	143-150-146-140=579	+3	400
T5	Argentina	141-146-143-151=581	+5	
T5	Hawaii	147-143-146-145=581	+5	
7	China	148-144-144-146=582	+6	
8	Canada	143-148-145-147=583	+7	
9	Puerto Rico	146-148-143-147=584	+8	
T10	Australia	146-149-146-147=588	+12	
T10	Ireland	149-148-148-143=588	+12	
12	Japan	145-149-147-149=590	+14	
T13	England	150-149-148-144=591	+15	
T13	Spain	150-149-148-144=591	+15	
15	Colombia	150-148-145-150=593	+17	
T16	Belgium	143-148-161-150=602	+26	
T16	Egypt	144-149-156-153=602	+26	
T16	Philippines	151-147-150-154=602	+26	
19	Chile	149-154-156-144=603	+27	
20	France	150-149-152-153=604	+28	
21	Italy	157-156-150-144=607	+31	
T22	Brazil	150-155-152-151=608	+32	
T22	Peru	153-157-143-155=608	+32	
24	Scotland	154-154-150-151=609	+33	
25	West Germany	153-151-153-154=611	+35	
26	Venezuela	148-156-153-157=614	+38	
27	Denmark	156-155-158-147=616	+40	
28	Wales	154-153-153-158=618	+42	
T29	Netherlands	159-154-153-153=619	+43	
T29	Uruguay	155-150-155-159=619	+43	
31	Switzerland	156-160-153-154=623	+47	
32	Guatemala	154-155-159-157=625	+49	
33	Jamaica	154-162-157-163=636	+60	
T34	Austria	160-157-159-164=640	+64	
T34	Paraguay	161-162-156-161=640	+64	
36	Sweden	162-159-159-167=647	+71	
37	Portugal	163-164-158-164=649	+73	
T38	Morocco	162-168-164-159=653	+77	
T38	Norway	156-171-158-168=653	+77	
40	Czechoslovakia	166-162-161-165=654	+78	

International Trophy

Place	Player	Country	Score	To par	Money (US$)
1	Arnold Palmer	United States	68-70-71-67=276	−12	1,000
T2	Bob Charles	New Zealand	72-72-69-68=281	−7	450
T2	Jack Nicklaus	United States	72-71-69-69=281	−7	450
4	Antonio Cerdá	Mexico	71-73-70-70=284	−4	200
5	Ted Makalena	Hawaii	75-70-71-69=285	−3	
T6	Fidel de Luca	Argentina	73-71-68-75=287	−1	
T6	Malcolm Gregson	England	74-72-69-72=287	−1	
8	Olivia Bernardini	Italy	73-76-69-70=288	E	
T9	Bruce Crampton	Australia	72-74-72-71=289	+1	
T9	Walter Godfrey	New Zealand	72-73-73-71=289	+1	
T9	Hsieh Yung-yo	China	71-71-73-74=289	+1	
T9	David Jiménez	Puerto Rico	71-72-70-76=289	+1	
T9	Gary Player	South Africa	69-75-74-71=289	+1	
