= Sumrie Tournament =

Tournament information
- Location: Kirkby in Ashfield, Nottinghamshire, England
- Established: 1968
- Course(s): Notts Golf Club
- Month played: May/June
- Final year: 1968

Final champion
- Brian Huggett

Location in England

The Sumrie Tournament was a professional golf tournament played at the Notts Golf Club, Kirkby in Ashfield, Nottinghamshire, England. The event was held just once, in 1968, and had total prize money of £6,000. The event was sponsored by C. & M. Sumrie Ltd of Leeds, clothing manufacturers and had a field of 100, the leading 80 in the 1967 Order of Merit and 20 invitations. The tournament was played with the bigger ball (1.68 in, 42.67 mm). From 1969 Sumrie sponsored a better-ball competition, the Sumrie Better-Ball.

== Winners ==
Year	Winner	Country	Venue	Score	Margin of victory	Runner-up	Winner's share (£)	Ref
1968	Brian Huggett	Wales	Notts Golf Club	282	4 strokes	(Spain) Ángel Gallardo	1,000	
