= Mário Gonzalez (golfer) =

Brazilian professional golfer (1922–2019)

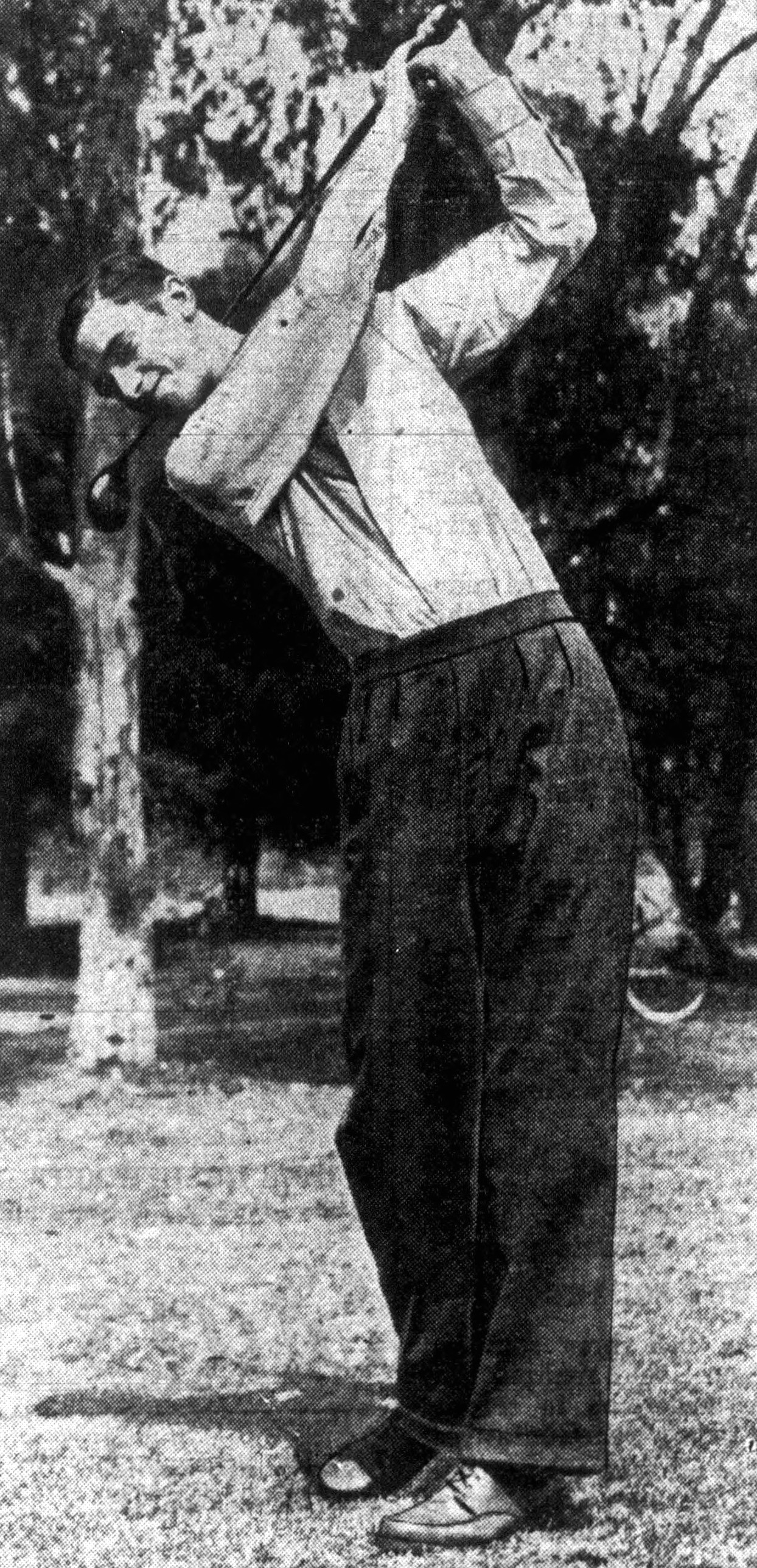
- Gonzalez, circa 1941

Personal information
- Full name: Mário Gonzalez
- Nationality: Brazil
- Born: 22 November 1922 Santana do Livramento, Brazil
- Died: 29 July 2019 (aged 96)

Career
- Sport: Golf
- Turned professional: 1949
- Professional wins: 15

Best results in major championships
- Masters Tournament: T48: 1962
- PGA Championship: DNP
- U.S. Open: CUT: 1941
- The Open Championship: T11: 1948

Achievements and awards
- Officer of the Order of Rio Branco: 2006

Mário Gonzalez (22 November 1922 – 29 July 2019) was a Brazilian professional golfer. He was one of the first players from his country to have enjoyed success on the international circuit and was known as the "father of Brazilian golf".

== Amateur career ==
As an amateur, Gonzalez had a great deal of success and built a reputation around the world. He won the Brazil Amateur Championship nine times, the Brazil Open twice, the Argentine Open in 1941, and the Spanish Open in 1947. He also played in several tournaments and matches in the United States; in 1941 he finished in a tie for sixth place in Chicago Open and tied a match with Bobby Jones. He had one other top-ten finish in a PGA Tour event, which came at the 1946 Pensacola Open. In the 1948 Open Championship he was near the top of the leaderboard before a poor final round saw him finish 11th, which was still enough to tie for low amateur honours.

== Professional career ==
After turning professional in 1949, he became the head professional at Gávea Golf and Country Club in Rio de Janeiro, where he remained until 1984. Although he did not pursue a playing career, he won many more tournaments including the Brazil Open a further 6 times and a second Argentine Open in 1953. He also represented Brazil in the Canada Cup, on sixteen occasions. In 1961 he was asked to appear in the first edition of Shell's Wonderful World of Golf; in the match held at Gávea, he beat Billy Casper by three strokes.

Gonzalez played in few international tournaments as a professional. However he did occasionally play in the major championships, recording best finishes of tied for 33rd in the 1956 Open Championship and tied for 48th in the 1962 Masters Tournament. In 2006 he was recognised by being awarded the honour of Officer of the Order of Rio Branco.

== Personal ==
Gonzalez was born in Santana do Livramento, in a small village named Holaeshu. His father José Maria, was a teaching professional and course designer. His younger brother José Maria Gonzalez Filho was also an accomplished golfer, winning the Brazilian Amateur four times, and his son Jaime Gonzalez has enjoyed a successful career playing on both the European Tour and PGA Tour.

== Amateur wins ==
- 9 x Brazilian Amateur Championship
- 3 x Argentine Amateur Championship

== Professional wins (15) ==
- 1940 Argentine Open (as an amateur)
- 1944 Uruguay Open (as an amateur)
- 1945 São Paulo Open (as an amateur)
- 1946 Brazil Open (as an amateur)
- 1947 Spanish Open (as an amateur)
- 1948 Brazil Open (as an amateur)
- 1949 Brazil Open
- 1950 Brazil Open
- 1951 Brazil Open, Uruguay Open
- 1953 Brazil Open, Argentine Open
- 1954 Abierto del Sur
- 1955 Brazil Open
- 1969 Brazil Open

== Team appearances ==
Professional

- World Cup (representing Brazil): 1954, 1955, 1956, 1957, 1958, 1959, 1960, 1961, 1962, 1963, 1964, 1965, 1967, 1968, 1970, 1971
