= 1998 Senior PGA Tour =

Golf tour season

1998 Senior PGA Tour season
- Duration: January 16, 1998 – November 8, 1998
- Number of official events: 39
- Most wins: (United States) Hale Irwin (7)
- Money list: (United States) Hale Irwin
- Player of the Year: (United States) Hale Irwin
- Rookie of the Year: (United States) Joe Inman

The 1998 Senior PGA Tour was the 19th season of the Senior PGA Tour, the main professional golf tour in the United States for men aged 50 and over.

== Schedule ==
The following table lists official events during the 1998 season.

Date	Tournament	Location	Purse (US$)	Winner (Note: The number in parentheses after each winner's name is the number of Senior PGA Tour events they had won up to and including that tournament. This information is only shown for Senior PGA Tour members.)	Notes
Jan 18	MasterCard Championship	Hawaii	1,000,000	(United States) Gil Morgan (8)	
Feb 1	Royal Caribbean Classic	Florida	850,000	(Australia) David Graham (4)	
Feb 8	LG Championship	Florida	1,200,000	(United States) Gil Morgan (9)	
Feb 15	GTE Classic	Florida	1,100,000	(United States) Jim Albus (6)	
Feb 23	American Express Invitational	Florida	1,200,000	(United States) Larry Nelson (1)	
Mar 16	Toshiba Senior Classic	California	1,100,000	(United States) Hale Irwin (14)	
Mar 29	Southwestern Bell Dominion	Texas	1,000,000	(United States) Lee Trevino (28)	
Apr 5	The Tradition	Arizona	1,400,650	(United States) Gil Morgan (10)	Senior PGA Tour major championship
Apr 19	PGA Seniors' Championship	Florida	1,500,000	(United States) Hale Irwin (15)	Senior major championship
Apr 26	Las Vegas Senior Classic	Nevada	1,400,000	(United States) Hale Irwin (16)	
May 3	Bruno's Memorial Classic	Alabama	1,150,000	(United States) Hubert Green (1)	
May 10	Home Depot Invitational	North Carolina	1,100,000	(United States) Jim Dent (12)	
May 17	Saint Luke's Classic	Missouri	1,000,000	(United States) Larry Ziegler (2)	
May 24	Bell Atlantic Classic	Pennsylvania	1,100,000	(United States) Jay Sigel (5)	
May 31	Pittsburgh Senior Classic	Pennsylvania	1,100,000	(United States) Larry Nelson (2)	
Jun 7	Nationwide Championship	Georgia	1,350,000	(United States) John Jacobs (1)	
Jun 14	BellSouth Senior Classic	Tennessee	1,300,000	(Japan) Isao Aoki (8)	
Jun 21	AT&T Canada Senior Open Championship	Canada	1,100,000	(Scotland) Brian Barnes (3)	
Jun 28	Cadillac NFL Golf Classic	New Jersey	1,100,000	(United States) Bob Dickson (1)	
Jul 5	State Farm Senior Classic	Maryland	1,250,000	(United States) Bruce Summerhays (2)	
Jul 12	Ford Senior Players Championship	Michigan	2,000,000	(United States) Gil Morgan (11)	Senior PGA Tour major championship
Jul 19	Ameritech Senior Open	Illinois	1,300,000	(United States) Hale Irwin (17)	
Jul 26	U.S. Senior Open	California	1,500,000	(United States) Hale Irwin (18)	Senior major championship
Aug 2	Utah Showdown	Utah	1,000,000	(United States) Gil Morgan (12)	
Aug 9	Senior British Open	Northern Ireland	£375,000	(Wales) Brian Huggett (n/a)	Senior major championship (Note: Unofficial money event at the time, but retrospectively counted as an official win.)
Aug 9	Coldwell Banker Burnet Classic	Minnesota	1,500,000	(United States) Leonard Thompson (1)	
Aug 16	First of America Classic	Michigan	1,000,000	(United States) George Archer (18)	
Aug 23	Northville Long Island Classic	New York	1,000,000	(South Africa) Gary Player (22)	
Aug 30	BankBoston Classic	Massachusetts	1,000,000	(United States) Hale Irwin (19)	
Sep 6	Emerald Coast Classic	Florida	1,100,000	(United States) Dana Quigley (2)	
Sep 13	Comfort Classic	Indiana	1,150,000	(South Africa) Hugh Baiocchi (2)	
Sep 20	Kroger Senior Classic	Ohio	1,100,000	(South Africa) Hugh Baiocchi (3)	
Sep 27	Boone Valley Classic	Missouri	1,300,000	(United States) Larry Nelson (3)	
Oct 4	Vantage Championship	North Carolina	1,500,000	(United States) Gil Morgan (13)	
Oct 11	The Transamerica	California	1,000,000	(United States) Jim Colbert (19)	
Oct 18	Raley's Gold Rush Classic	California	1,000,000	(United States) Dana Quigley (3)	
Oct 25	EMC Kaanapali Classic	Hawaii	1,000,000	(United States) Jay Sigel (6)	
Nov 1	Pacific Bell Senior Classic	California	1,100,000	(United States) Joe Inman (1)	
Nov 8	Energizer Senior Tour Championship	South Carolina	2,000,000	(United States) Hale Irwin (20)	Tour Championship

=== Unofficial events ===
The following events were sanctioned by the Senior PGA Tour, but did not carry official money, nor were wins official.

Date	Tournament	Location	Purse ($)	Winners	Notes
Dec 6	Office Depot Father/Son Challenge	Florida	860,000	(New Zealand) Bob Charles and son David Charles	Team event

== Money list ==
The money list was based on prize money won during the season, calculated in U.S. dollars.

Position	Player	Prize money ($)
1	(United States) Hale Irwin	2,861,945
2	(United States) Gil Morgan	2,179,047
3	(United States) Larry Nelson	1,442,476
4	(United States) Jay Sigel	1,403,912
5	(South Africa) Hugh Baiocchi	1,183,959

== Awards ==
Award	Winner	Ref.
Player of the Year (Jack Nicklaus Trophy)	(United States) Hale Irwin	
Rookie of the Year	(United States) Joe Inman	
Scoring leader (Byron Nelson Award)	(United States) Hale Irwin	
Comeback Player of the Year	(United States) Jim Colbert	
