= Ted Makalena =

American professional golfer (1934–1968

Personal information
- Full name: Theodore Makalena
- Nationality: United States
- Born: June 14, 1934 Hawaii, U.S.
- Died: September 13, 1968 (aged 34) Hawaii, U.S.

Career
- Sport: Golf
- Status: Professional
- Former tour: PGA Tour
- Professional wins: 1

Number of wins by tour
- PGA Tour: 1

Best results in major championships
- Masters Tournament: DNP
- PGA Championship: DNP
- U.S. Open: T23: 1964
- The Open Championship: DNP

Theodore Makalena (June 14, 1934 – September 13, 1968) was an American professional golfer who played in the 1960s.

== Career ==
Makalena was born and raised in Hawaii, where he attended St. Louis High School in Honolulu. He started out as a caddie at the age of 8 and eventually worked to become a club professional.

Makalena's only win in an official PGA Tour event came on October 30, 1966, when he won the Hawaiian Open by defeating veteran tour professionals Billy Casper and Gay Brewer. His record-breaking score of 271 for 72 holes stood for many years. He was the first Hawaiian-born golfer to win this event, and one of only two to have ever won it (the other being David Ishii in 1990). Makalena's victory in this event made him a very popular figure in Hawaii.

== Death and legacy ==
Two years after his win in the Hawaiian Open, Makalena died at the age of 34 less than five days after being injured in a swimming accident in Waikiki. Governor John Burns designated September 28, 1968 as Ted Makalena Day. A couple months later, after winning the 1968 Hawaiian Open, Lee Trevino turned over $10,000 of his winner's check to a trust fund honoring Makalena.

A golf facility in Waipahu that borders Pearl Harbor is named for him. He is interred at Diamond Head Memorial Park in Honolulu.

== Professional wins (1) ==
=== PGA Tour wins (1) ===
No.	Date	Tournament	Winning score	Margin of victory	Runners-up
1	Oct 30, 1966	Hawaiian Open	−17 (66-71-66-68=271)	3 strokes	(United States) Gay Brewer, (United States) Billy Casper

== Team appearances ==
- World Cup (representing Hawaii): 1964, 1965, 1966, 1967
