= Ovidio Bolognesi =

Italian professional golfer

Personal information
- Nationality: Italy
- Born: Rome, Italy
- Died: August 2016 aged 85

Career
- Sport: Golf
- Status: Professional
- Professional wins: 1

Ovidio Bolognesi (c 1931 – August 2016) was an Italian professional golfer. He was one of the leading Italian golfers of the 1950s and 1960s, representing Italy four times in the World Cup. He was the professional at Turin Golf Club La Mandria for many years from 1957. His sons Emanuele and Massimo were also professional golfers.

== Professional wins (1) ==
- 1963 Italian Native Open

== Team appearances ==
- World Cup (representing Italy): 1960, 1962, 1963, 1964
- Joy Cup (representing the Rest of Europe): 1956
