= Sumrie Better-Ball =

Tournament information
- Location: Bournemouth, Dorset, England (1974–78)
- Established: 1969
- Course(s): Queen's Park Golf Club (1974–78)
- Final year: 1978

Final champion
- Eamonn Darcy and Christy O'Connor Jnr

The Sumrie Better-Ball was a professional golf tournament played from 1969 to 1978. It was a 72-hole better-ball stroke-play event. It was played at Pannal in 1969 and 1970 and then at Blairgowrie in 1972 and 1973. From 1974 it was called the Sumrie-Bournemouth Better-Ball and was played at Queen's Park Golf Club, Bournemouth, England. The tournament was sponsored by Sumrie Clothes who has previously supported the Sumrie Tournament in 1968.

== Winners ==
Year	Winners	Country	Venue	Score	Margin of victory	Runner(s)-up	Winner's share (£)	Ref
Sumrie Better-Ball
1969	Maurice Bembridge & Ángel Gallardo	England; Spain	Pannal	263 (−29)	1 stroke	(England) Hedley Muscroft & (England) Lionel Platts	1,000 (each)	
1970	Neil Coles & Bernard Hunt	England; England	Pannal	257 (−31)	4 strokes	(England) Peter Butler & (England) Clive Clark	800 (each)	
1971: No tournament
1972	Malcolm Gregson & Brian Huggett	England; Wales	Blairgowrie	264 (−24)	1 stroke	(England) Guy Hunt & (England) Doug McClelland	800 (each)	
1973	Neil Coles & Bernard Hunt	England; England	Blairgowrie	265 (−27)	5 strokes	(England) Malcolm Gregson & (Wales) Brian Huggett	800 (each)	
Sumrie-Bournemouth Better-Ball
1974	Peter Butler & Clive Clark	England; England	Queen's Park	267 (−21)	Playoff	(Wales) Craig Defoy & (England) Derek Small (Northern Ireland) Vince Hood & (Northern Ireland) Hugh Jackson	1,200 (each)	
1975	Jack Newton & John O'Leary	Australia; Ireland	Queen's Park	256 (−32)	4 strokes	(Scotland) Brian Barnes & (Scotland) Bernard Gallacher (England) Neil Coles & (England) Bernard Hunt (England) John Fowler & (England) Nick Job	1,200 (each)	
1976	Eamonn Darcy & Christy O'Connor Jnr	Ireland; Ireland	Queen's Park	260 (−28)	Playoff	(England) Maurice Bembridge & (Scotland) Norman Wood	1,200 (each)	
1977: No tournament
1978	Eamonn Darcy & Christy O'Connor Jnr	Ireland; Ireland	Queen's Park	255 (−33)	4 strokes	(Australia) Rodger Davis & (Australia) Chris Tickner	2,000 (each)	
