= 1994 European Seniors Tour =

Golf tour season

1994 European Seniors Tour season
- Duration: 13 May 1994 – 24 September 1994
- Number of official events: 11
- Most wins: (England) John Morgan (3)
- Order of Merit: (England) John Morgan

The 1994 European Seniors Tour was the third season of the European Seniors Tour, the main professional golf tour in Europe for men aged 50 and over.

== Schedule ==
The following table lists official events during the 1994 season.

Date	Tournament	Host country	Purse (£)	Winner (Note: The number in brackets after each winner's name is the number of European Seniors Tour events they had won up to and including that tournament. This information is only shown for European Seniors Tour members.)	Notes
15 May	St Pierre Seniors Classic	Wales	50,000	(England) Tommy Horton (5)	
22 May	La Manga Spanish Seniors Open	Spain	100,000	(Wales) Brian Huggett (5)	New tournament
10 Jun	D Day Seniors Open	France	50,000	(England) Brian Waites (1)	New tournament
26 Jun	Northern Electric Seniors	England	50,000	(England) John Morgan (1)	
2 Jul	Tandem Stockley Park Seniors Open	England	52,000	(England) Malcolm Gregson (1)	New tournament
23 Jul	Senior British Open	England	220,000	(United States) Tom Wargo (n/a)	Senior major championship
29 Jul	Lawrence Batley Seniors	England	65,000	(England) John Morgan (2)	
7 Aug	Forte PGA Seniors Championship	England	75,000	(England) John Morgan (3)	
13 Aug	Belfast Telegraph Irish Senior Masters	Northern Ireland	60,000	(England) Tommy Horton (6)	
25 Aug	Joe Powell Memorial Seniors Classic	England	52,000	(Republic of Ireland) Liam Higgins (1)	
4 Sep	Shell Scottish Seniors Open	Scotland	100,000	(Spain) Antonio Garrido (1)	
24 Sep	Zurich Senior Lexus Trophy	Switzerland	47,000	(Republic of Ireland) Liam Higgins (2)	

== Order of Merit ==
The Order of Merit was based on prize money won during the season, calculated in Pound sterling.

Position	Player	Prize money (£)
1	(England) John Morgan	57,209
2	(Wales) Brian Huggett	48,678
3	(England) Tommy Horton	45,716
4	(England) Malcolm Gregson	41,189
5	(Spain) Antonio Garrido	41,102
