= Callers of Newcastle =

1977 golf tournament in England

Tournament information
- Location: Whitley Bay, Tyne and Wear, England
- Established: 1977
- Course: Whitley Bay Golf Club
- Par: 72
- Tour: European Tour
- Format: Stroke play
- Prize fund: £25,000
- Month played: July
- Final year: 1977

Tournament record score
- Aggregate: 282 Peter Butler (1977); 282 John Fourie (1977); 282 Ángel Gallardo (1977); 282 Tommy Horton (1977)
- To par: −6 as above

Final champion
- (South Africa) John Fourie
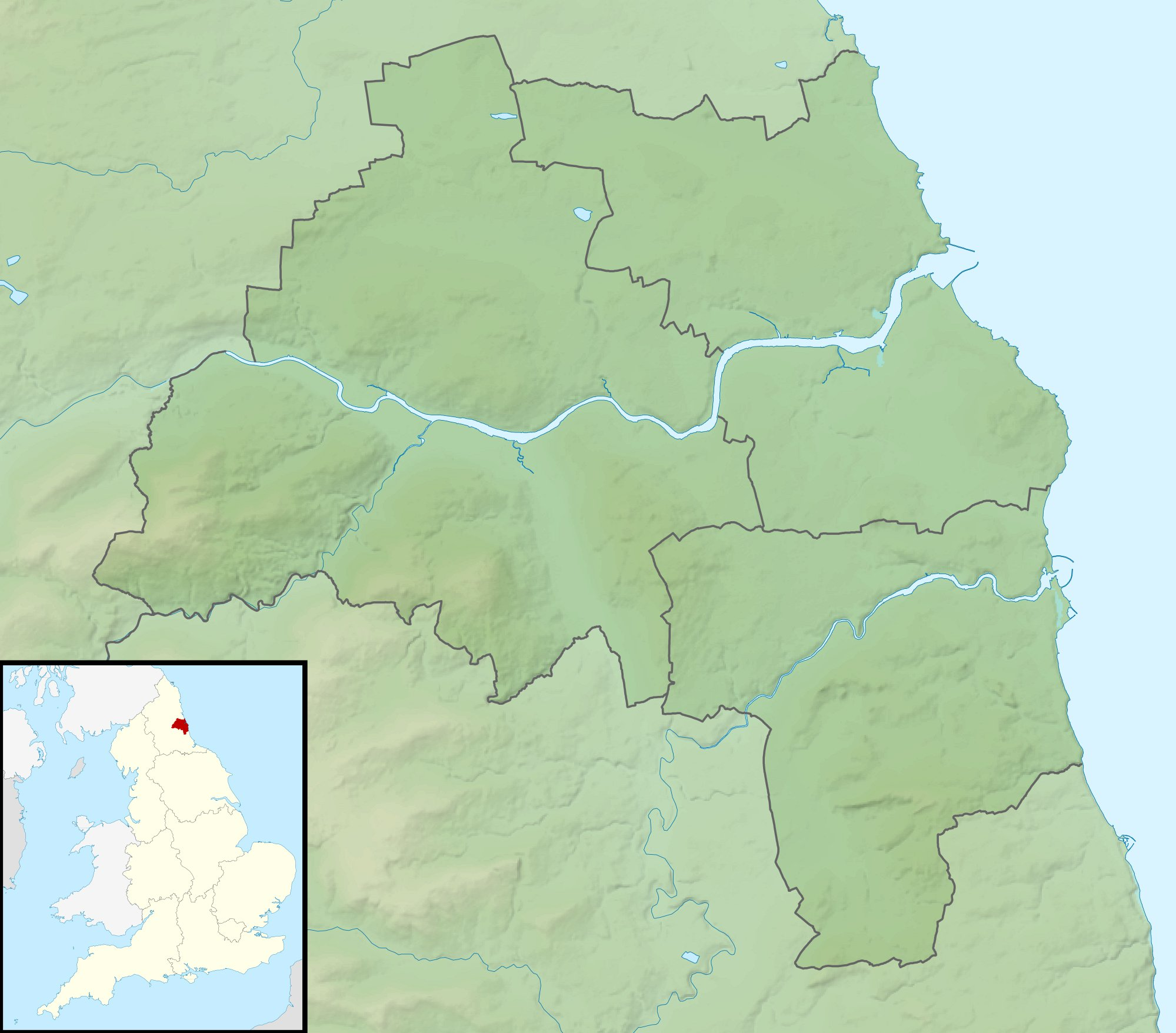
- Location in England Location in Tyne and Wear

The Callers of Newcastle was a golf tournament on the European Tour in 1977 named after its sponsor, the Callers department store. It was held at Whitley Bay Golf Club in Whitley Bay, England.

The tournament was won by South Africa's John Fourie, who defeated Peter Butler, Ángel Gallardo and Tommy Horton in a four way playoff. The playoff started at the 16th hole. Butler and Horton bogeyed the first extra hole and Fourie won at the next after he made a par 3,

== Winners ==
Year	Winner	Score	To par	Margin of victory	Runners-up	Winner's share (£)	Ref.
1977	(South Africa) John Fourie	282	−6	Playoff	(England) Peter Butler (Spain) Ángel Gallardo (England) Tommy Horton	5,000	
