= 1964 Canada Cup =

Coordinates: 20.920°N 156.694°W

Tournament information
- Dates: December 3–6
- Location: Kaanapali, Hawaii, U.S.
- Courses: Kaanapali Golf Resort; Royal course
- Format: 72 holes stroke play combined score

Statistics
- Par: 72
- Length: 7,215 yards (6,597 m)
- Field: 34 two-man teams

Champion
- United States; Jack Nicklaus & Arnold Palmer
- 554 (−22)

The 1964 Canada Cup took place December 3–6 at the Kaanapali Golf Resort in Kaanapali, Hawaii, on the island of Maui. It was the 12th Canada Cup event, which became the World Cup in 1967. The tournament was a 72-hole stroke play team event with 34 teams. These were the same teams that had competed in 1963 but with the addition of Hawaii. Each team consisted of two players from a country. The combined score of each team determined the team results. The American team of Jack Nicklaus and Arnold Palmer won by 11 strokes over the Argentine team of Roberto De Vicenzo and Leopoldo Ruiz. The individual competition was won by Jack Nicklaus, who finished two shots ahead of Arnold Palmer.

== Teams ==
Country	Players
Argentina	Roberto De Vicenzo and Leopoldo Ruiz
Australia	Bruce Crampton and Bruce Devlin
Austria	Alexander Maculan (a) and Klaus Nierlich (a)
Belgium	Donald Swaelens and Flory Van Donck
Brazil	José Maria Gonzalez and Mário Gonzalez
Canada	Al Balding and George Knudson
Chile	Enrique Orellana and Alberto Salas
Colombia	Rogelio González and Miguel Sala
Denmark	Jorgen Korfitzen and Carl Paulsen
Egypt	Cherif El-Sayed Cherif and Mohamed Said Moussa
England	Peter Alliss and Bernard Hunt
France	Jean Garaïalde and François Saubaber
Hawaii	Ted Makalena and Paul Scodeller
Ireland	Jimmy Martin and Christy O'Connor Snr
Italy	Alfonso Angelini and Ovidio Bolognesi
Japan	Tomoo Ishii and Tadashi Kitta
Mexico	Margarito Martinez and Juan Neri
Netherlands	Gerard de Wit and Martin Roesink
New Zealand	Frank Buckler and Bob Charles
Peru	Hugo Nari and Wilfredo Uculmana
Philippines	Ben Arda and Celestino Tugot
Portugal	Fernando Pina and Joaquim Rodriguez
Puerto Rico	David Jimenez and Chi-Chi Rodríguez
Scotland	John Panton and Bobby Walker
South Africa	Denis Hutchinson and Gary Player
Spain	Ángel Miguel and Ramón Sota
Sweden	Åke Bergquist and Harry Karlsson-Fakt
Switzerland	Otto Schoepfer and Ronald Tingley
Taiwan	Chen Ching-po and Hsieh Yung-yo
United States	Jack Nicklaus and Arnold Palmer
Uruguay	Juan Sereda and Pascual Viola
Venezuela	Francisco Gonzales and Teobaldo Perez
Wales	Brian Huggett and Dai Rees
West Germany	Heinz Fehring and Toni Kugelmüller

== Scores ==
Team

Place	Country	Score	To par
1	United States	138-136-132-148=554	−22
2	Argentina	140-139-142-144=565	−11
3	South Africa	138-136-141-153=568	−8
4	Spain	149-138-142-143=572	−4
5	England	144-144-146-144=578	+2
6	Hawaii	141-146-144-148=579	+3
7	Canada	146-148-143-147=584	+8
8	Japan	149-142-144-150=585	+9
9	Brazil	143-150-147-147=587	+11
10	Belgium	147-142-148-151=588	+12
11	Taiwan	144-148-146-152=590	+14
T12	Philippines	142-153-141-155=591	+15
T12	Wales	151-146-146-148=591	+15
14	Puerto Rico	148-144-148-155=595	+19
15	Australia	146-153-148-149=596	+20
T16	New Zealand	152-144-152-152=600	+24
T16	Scotland	154-141-149-156=600	+24
18	Ireland	153-147-150-151=601	+25
19	Colombia	155-151-148-149=603	+27
20	Netherlands	148-154-151-152=605	+29
21	Chile	151-151-153-152=607	+31
T22	France	152-156-147-157=612	+36
T22	West Germany	151-152-151-158=612	+36
24	Mexico	153-155-154-151=613	+37
25	Italy	152-153-158-154=617	+41
26	Egypt	159-157-152-152=620	+44
27	Denmark	156-159-153-159=627	+51
T28	Uruguay	161-160-158-152=631	+55
T28	Venezuela	158-160-158-155=631	+55
30	Peru	159-156-162-156=633	+57
31	Switzerland	165-165-151-162=643	+67
32	Austria	156-163-165-166=650	+74
33	Portugal	165-167-165-162=659	+83
34	Sweden	165-162-169-168=664	+88

International Trophy

Place	Player	Country	Score	To par
1	Jack Nicklaus	United States	72-69-65-70=276	−12
2	Arnold Palmer	United States	66-67-67-78=278	−10
T3	Ted Makalena	Hawaii	69-68-70-72=279	−9
T3	Gary Player	South Africa	69-66-68-76=279	−9
5	Roberto De Vicenzo	Argentina	71-69-68-73=281	−7
6	Leopoldo Ruiz	Argentina	69-70-74-71=284	−4
7	Ángel Miguel	Spain	74-70-72-69=285	−3
T8	Ramón Sota	Spain	75-68-70-74=287	−1
T8	Flory Van Donck	Belgium	70-71-73-73=287	−1
T10	Peter Alliss	England	70-72-73-74=289	+1
T10	Bernard Hunt	England	74-72-73-70=289	+1
T10	Denis Hutchinson	South Africa	69-70-73-77=289	+1
