= 1992 European Seniors Tour =

Golf tour season

1992 European Seniors Tour season
- Duration: 24 April 1992 – 5 December 1992
- Number of official events: 10
- Most wins: (South Africa) John Fourie (2) (Wales) Brian Huggett (2)
- Order of Merit: (South Africa) John Fourie

The 1992 European Seniors Tour was the inaugural season of the European Seniors Tour, the main professional golf tour in Europe for men aged 50 and over.

== Schedule ==
The following table lists official events during the 1992 season.

Date	Tournament	Host country	Purse (£)	Winner (Note: The number in brackets after each winner's name is the number of European Seniors Tour events they had won up to and including that tournament. This information is only shown for European Seniors Tour members.)	Notes
26 Apr	Gary Player Anvil Senior Classic	Wales	40,000	(Wales) Brian Huggett (1)	New tournament
4 Jul	La Bresse Seniors	France	25,000	(Spain) José Maria Roca (1)	New tournament
8 Jul	Turespaña Léman International Senior Trophy	Switzerland	35,000	(France) Jean Garaïalde (1)	
26 Jul	Senior British Open	England	200,000	(South Africa) John Fourie (1)	Senior major championship
31 Jul	Lawrence Batley Seniors	England	50,000	(South Africa) Bobby Verwey (1)	New tournament
9 Aug	Forte PGA Seniors Championship	Ireland	55,000	(England) Tommy Horton (1)	
23 Aug	Belfast Telegraph Irish Senior Masters	Northern Ireland	50,000	(South Africa) John Fourie (2)	New tournament
30 Aug	Northern Electric Seniors	England	50,000	(Wales) Brian Huggett (2)	New tournament
4 Oct	Collingtree Homes Seniors Classic	England	40,000	(England) Neil Coles (1)	New tournament
5 Dec	Tunisian Seniors	Tunisia	50,000	(Scotland) John Hamilton (1)	New tournament

== Order of Merit ==
The Order of Merit was based on prize money won during the season, calculated in Pound sterling.

Position	Player	Prize money (£)
1	(South Africa) John Fourie	47,856
2	(England) Tommy Horton	33,400
3	(England) Neil Coles	29,942
4	(England) Peter Butler	20,326
5	(Wales) Brian Huggett	19,886
