= Christy O'Connor Jnr =

Irish golfer (1948–2016)

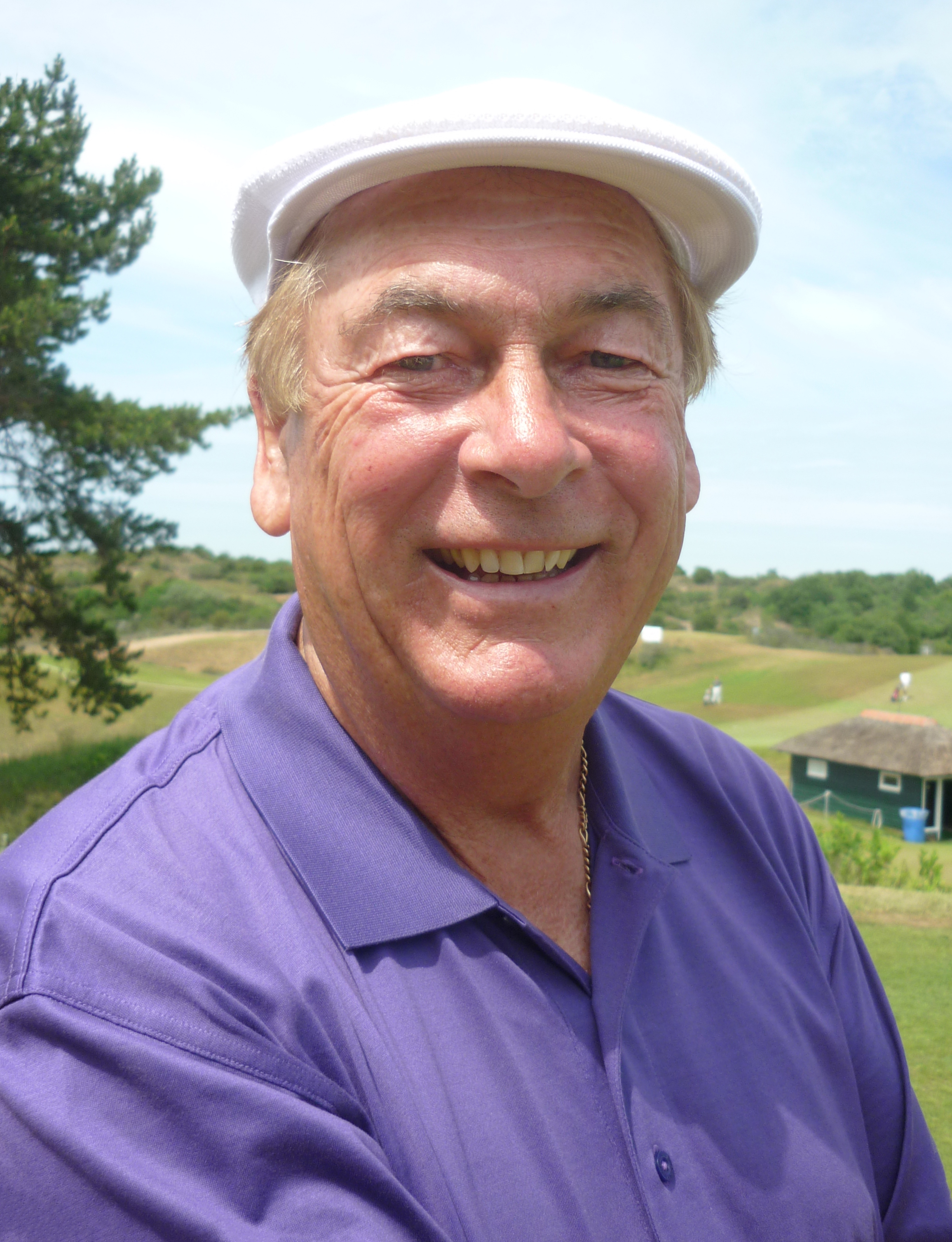
- O'Connor in 2010

Personal information
- Nickname: Junior
- Nationality: Ireland
- Born: 19 August 1948 County Galway, Ireland
- Died: 6 January 2016 (aged 67) Tenerife, Canary Islands, Spain
- Height: 1.80 m (5 ft 11 in)
- Weight: 86 kg (190 lb; 13.5 st)
- Spouse: Ann

Career
- Sport: Golf
- Turned professional: 1967
- Former tours: European Tour; European Seniors Tour; Champions Tour
- Professional wins: 16

Number of wins by tour
- European Tour: 4
- PGA Tour Champions: 4
- European Senior Tour: 2
- Other: 8

Best results in major championships
- Masters Tournament: CUT: 1977
- PGA Championship: DNP
- U.S. Open: DNP
- The Open Championship: T3: 1985

Christopher O'Connor (known as Christy O'Connor Junior; 19 August 1948 – 6 January 2016) was an Irish professional golfer. He is often known for defeating American Fred Couples at the 1989 Ryder Cup, helping Europe secure the trophy.

== Early life ==
O'Connor was born in 1948 in Knocknacarra, a village in Salthill in County Galway. He was the son of Elizabeth (née Noone) and John O'Connor. The family farmed cattle and pigs near a golf club.

O'Connor was not born with the "Junior" suffix. Rather, it was added to his name after he turned pro in the 1970s to distinguish him from his uncle Christy O'Connor, also a well-known professional golfer. (The suffix "Senior" was added to the elder O'Connor's name too.)

== Professional career ==
In 1967, O'Connor turned professional. He played on the European Tour. It took him a few years to find his footing but in 1975 he won two tournaments and finished 7th on the Order of Merit. His second victory of the year at the Carroll's Irish Open was particularly memorable. O'Connor became only the second Irishman to win his national open; the first since the 1940s. His good play earned him his first Ryder Cup appearance that year.

In 1976, O'Connor contended at the Open Championship for the first time. He opened with the co-lead with Seve Ballesteros, shooting a first-round 69 (−3), before falling out of contention with a 73 and 75. He closed, however, with a one-under-par 71 round to finish in the top 5. O'Connor would finish in the top 30 of the Order of Merit for the third straight year. This good play helped O'Connor earn an invitation to play in the Masters Tournament for the only time as well.

Despite all of this success in his late 20s, O'Connor did not immediately progress into one of the stars of the European golfing scene. While young pros like Ballesteros, Nick Faldo, and Bernhard Langer were taking the European Tour by storm O'Connor was in the background during these years. In a five-season span, between 1977 and 1981, he recorded only four tops-10s and never finished better than 49th on the Order of Merit.

The 1982 season was a return to form. Though he only recorded two top-10s, he finished 40th on the Order of Merit and had his lowest scoring average ever. The next two seasons were similarly solid, with a number of top-10s, similar Order of Merit ranking, and improved scoring average every year.

At the 1985 Open Championship O'Connor opened with a 64 (−6), taking a four-stroke lead after the first round. He came back to the field with a second-round 76 but was still in the mix until the last day. He played with champion Sandy Lyle in the fourth round and finished only two shots back, placing T-3. He would record an additional five top-10s that year and finish 12th on the Order of Merit, easily his best in a decade.

He built on this success, finishing in the top 30 of the Order of Merit every year, until winning the 1989 Jersey Open. He defeated Englishman Denis Durnian in a playoff. It was his first victory in 14 years, the longest gap between European Tour victories at the time. This victory helped him earn a place in Europe's 1989 Ryder Cup team.

Despite his recent good play, O'Connor's selection was criticised by many and he was called a "weak link" by elements of the British press. Not one of the nine automatic selections, O'Connor was one of captain Tony Jacklin's picks and had the lowest world ranking (#71) of anyone on either team. O'Connor lost his only team match on the second day of the event and faced Fred Couples in Sunday singles play. Couples was a rising star who, only a few years later, became ranked #1 in the world. O'Connor played evenly against Couples as the match went down to the last hole. On the 18th, the long-hitting Couples hit a fortunate drive, cutting the dogleg and requiring only a nine-iron into the green. O'Connor's solid drive down the middle of the fairway required much more distance to reach the green. Encouraged by words from Jacklin, O'Connor hit a perfect two-iron over a pond to within four feet. Jacklin called O'Connor's approach "the shot of his lifetime". Couples overshot the green and, after failing to get up and down, conceded the match. Europe retained the cup with a 14–14 tie, with Jacklin observing of O'Connor: "We couldn't have retained it without him, no doubt".

O'Connor played relatively well for a few years and finished in the top 75 of the Order of Merit between 1990 and 1992, culminating with his victory at the 1992 British Masters. He hit several recovery shots from behind trees during the last round and some unlikely birdies. The victory qualified him for the NEC World Series of Golf, a prestigious winners-only event in America.

O'Connor would no longer remain competitive on the regular tour shortly after his win. He would not finish in the top 100 of the Order of Merit again after the 1992 season. He would, however, play very well for his first two seasons as a senior. Despite rarely playing in the United States during the heart of his career he decided to join the Senior PGA Tour in 1999. He played full-time in 1999 and 2000, winning two events and earning over a million dollars. He would also play sporadically on the European Seniors Tour, winning the Senior British Open twice in back-to-back years, 1999 and 2000. For the 2001 Senior British Open, O'Connor was not able to play and defend his title due to an ankle injury sustained when his motorcycle fell on him.

== Personal life ==
O'Connor was married to Ann. He had three children, Nigel, Ann, and Darren. His son Darren died in a car accident when he was 17 years old.

O'Connor was a supporter of the Special Olympics. O'Connor was also active in golf course design, being involved in the design of at least 18 courses in Ireland, and many more abroad.

O'Connor died whilst on holiday with his wife Ann on 6 January 2016 in Tenerife, Canary Islands.

== Professional wins (16) ==
=== European Tour wins (4) ===
No.	Date	Tournament	Winning score	Margin of victory	Runner-up
1	14 Jun 1975	Martini International	−5 (71-68-70-70=279)	Shared title with (Australia) Ian Stanley	
2	31 Aug 1975	Carroll's Irish Open	−21 (66-70-69-70=275)	1 stroke	(Scotland) Harry Bannerman
3	9 Apr 1989	Jersey European Airways Open	−3 (73-70-66-72=281)	Playoff	(England) Denis Durnian
4	31 May 1992	Dunhill British Masters	−18 (71-67-66-66=270)	Playoff	(Zimbabwe) Tony Johnstone

European Tour playoff record (2–2)

No.	Year	Tournament	Opponent(s)	Result
1	1972	Penfold-Bournemouth Tournament	(England) Peter Oosterhuis	Lost to birdie on first extra hole
2	1986	Bell's Scottish Open	(Australia) Ian Baker-Finch, (Northern Ireland) David Feherty	Feherty won with birdie on second extra hole
3	1989	Jersey European Airways Open	(England) Denis Durnian	Won with par on first extra hole
4	1992	Dunhill British Masters	(Zimbabwe) Tony Johnstone	Won with birdie on first extra hole

=== Safari Circuit wins (2) ===
No.	Date	Tournament	Winning score	Margin of victory	Runner(s)-up
1	24 Mar 1974	Zambia Open	−10 (72-68-70-72=282)	Playoff	(England) Mike Ingham, (Northern Ireland) Eddie Polland
2	28 Jan 1990	555 Kenya Open	−13 (66-67-67-71=271)	2 strokes	(England) Chris Platts

=== Other wins (6) ===
- 1973 Carroll's Irish Match Play Championship
- 1974 Irish Dunlop Tournament
- 1975 Carroll's Irish Match Play Championship
- 1976 Sumrie-Bournemouth Better-Ball (with Eamonn Darcy)
- 1977 Carroll's Irish Match Play Championship
- 1978 Sumrie-Bournemouth Better-Ball (with Eamonn Darcy)

=== Senior PGA Tour wins (4) ===
Legend
Senior major championships (2)
Other Senior PGA Tour (2)

No.	Date	Tournament	Winning score	Margin of victory	Runner(s)-up
1	4 Jul 1999	State Farm Senior Classic	−18 (65-66-67=198)	1 stroke	(United States) Bruce Fleisher
2	25 Jul 1999	Senior British Open	−6 (76-69-68-69=282)	3 strokes	(South Africa) John Bland
3	15 Aug 1999	Foremost Insurance Championship	−11 (69-68-68=205)	4 strokes	(United States) George Archer, (United States) John Jacobs, (United States) Jim Thorpe
4	30 Jul 2000	Senior British Open (2)	−9 (69-68-70-68=275)	2 strokes	(South Africa) John Bland

=== European Seniors Tour wins (2) ===
Legend
Senior major championships (2)
Other European Seniors Tour (0)

No.	Date	Tournament	Winning score	Margin of victory	Runner-up
1	25 Jul 1999	Senior British Open	−6 (76-69-68-69=282)	3 strokes	(South Africa) John Bland
2	30 Jul 2000	Senior British Open (2)	−9 (69-68-70-68=275)	2 strokes	(South Africa) John Bland

== Results in major championships ==
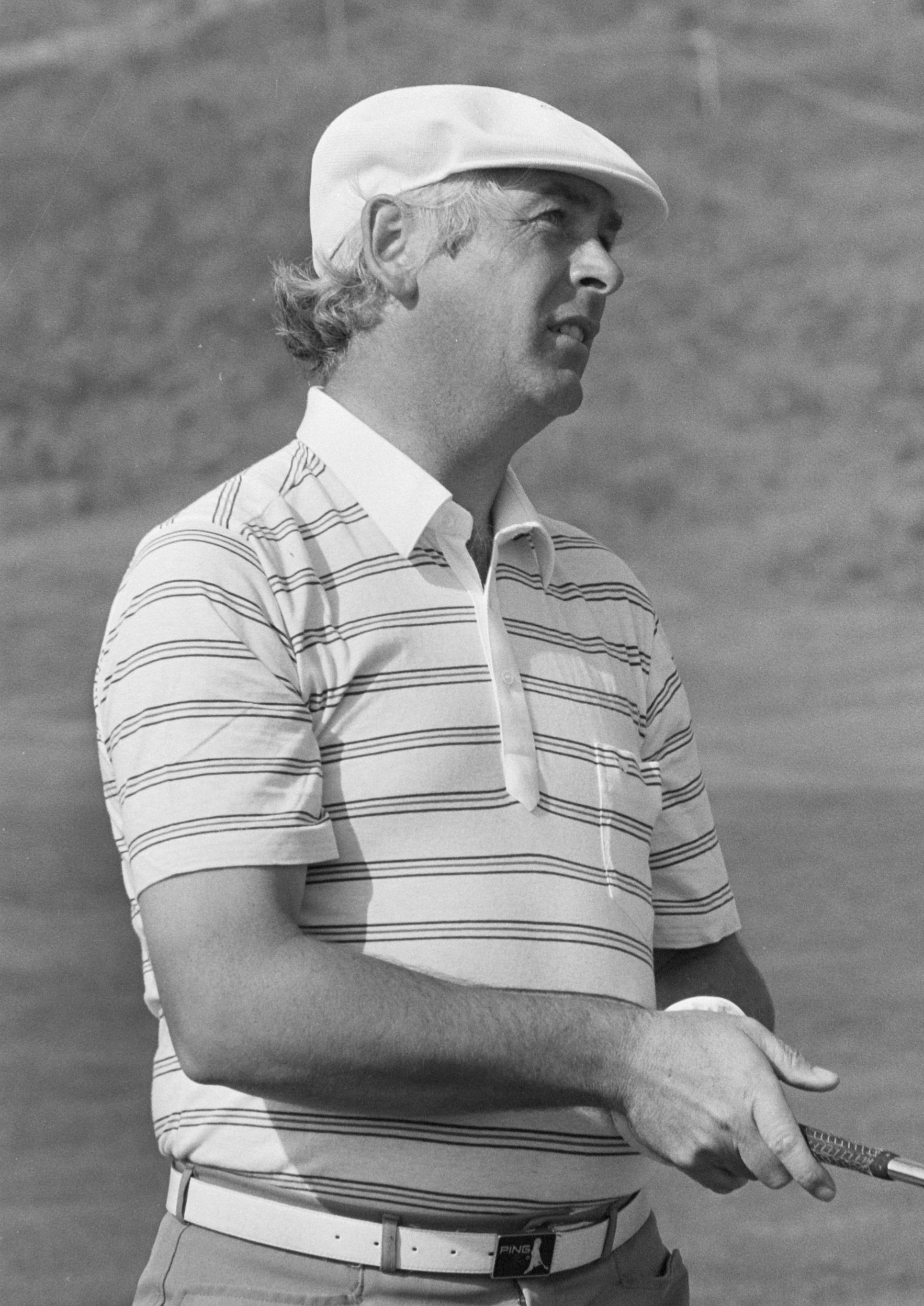
O'Connor in 1985

Tournament	1970	1971	1972	1973	1974	1975	1976	1977	1978	1979
Masters Tournament								CUT		
The Open Championship	CUT				T24	T47	T5	T52	CUT	

Tournament	1980	1981	1982	1983	1984	1985	1986	1987	1988	1989
The Open Championship	CUT		CUT	T8	CUT	T3	T11	CUT	CUT	T49

Tournament	1990	1991	1992	1993	1994	1995	1996	1997	1998	1999	2000
The Open Championship	T25	T32		T39	T60						T60

Top 10
Did not play

CUT = missed the half-way cut (3rd round cut in 1984 Open Championship)
"T" indicates a tie for a place
Note: O'Connor never played in the U.S. Open or the PGA Championship.

== Senior major championships ==
=== Wins (2) ===
Year	Championship	Winning score	Margin	Runner-up
1999	Senior British Open	−6 (76-69-68-69=282)	3 strokes	(South Africa) John Bland
2000	Senior British Open (2)	−9 (69-68-70-68=275)	2 strokes	(South Africa) John Bland

== Team appearances ==
- Double Diamond International (representing Ireland): 1972, 1974, 1975, 1976, 1977
- Sotogrande Match/Hennessy Cognac Cup (representing Great Britain and Ireland): 1974 (winners), (representing Ireland) 1984
- World Cup (representing Ireland): 1974, 1975, 1978, 1985, 1989, 1992
- Ryder Cup (representing Great Britain and Ireland/Europe): 1975, 1989 (tied – retained Cup)
- Datsun International (representing Great Britain and Ireland): 1976
- Philip Morris International (representing Ireland): 1975, 1976
- Dunhill Cup (representing Ireland): 1985, 1989, 1992
- Praia d'El Rey European Cup: 1998 (tie)
