= Brian Huggett =

Welsh professional golfer (1936–2024)

Brian Huggett MBE
Personal information
- Full name: Brian George Charles Huggett
- Nickname: Welsh bulldog
- Nationality: Wales
- Born: 18 November 1936 Porthcawl, Wales
- Died: 22 September 2024 (aged 87)
- Height: 5 ft 6 in (1.68 m)

Career
- Sport: Golf
- Turned professional: 1951
- Former tours: European Tour; European Seniors Tour
- Professional wins: 34

Number of wins by tour
- European Tour: 2
- PGA Tour Champions: 1
- European Senior Tour: 10 (4th all-time)
- Other: 22

Best results in major championships
- Masters Tournament: CUT: 1969
- PGA Championship: DNP
- U.S. Open: DNP
- The Open Championship: T2: 1965

Achievements and awards
- Officer of the Order of the British Empire: 1978
- Harry Vardon Trophy: 1968

Brian George Charles Huggett, MBE (18 November 1936 − 22 September 2024) was a Welsh professional golfer. He won 16 events on the European circuit between 1962 and 1978, including two after the formal start of the European Tour in 1972. In 1968 he won the Harry Vardon Trophy for leading the Order of Merit and he was in third place in 1969, 1970 and 1972. He won 10 times on the European Seniors Tour between 1992 and 2000, including the 1998 Senior British Open.

Huggett played six times for Great Britain and Ireland in the Ryder Cup between 1963 and 1975 and had a 9–10–6 win–loss–half record, despite never being on a winning team. He was also the Great Britain & Ireland's non-playing captain in 1977. He represented Wales nine times in the World Cup between 1963 and 1979. He played in the Open Championship 19 successive times between 1961 and 1979, finishing tied for third place in 1962 and joint runner-up in 1965.

== Early life ==
Huggett was born in Porthcawl, Wales, the son of George Huggett, who was an assistant professional at Royal Porthcawl Golf Club. After World War II, George was the professional at Neath Golf Club before moving to Redhill and Reigate Golf Club, in Surrey, in 1950. Huggett had a younger brother Geoff who was also a professional golfer.

== Professional career ==
In 1951, Huggett turned professional becoming an assistant to his father at Redhill and Reigate, later being the professional at Romford Golf Club from 1960 to 1966. In 1963 he was joined at Romford by his father.

=== British PGA ===
Huggett won his first important individual event in 1962, the Dutch Open. He had been runner-up the previous year. Earlier in 1962, he had finished tied for third in the Open Championship, albeit a full 13 shots behind runaway winner Arnold Palmer. Huggett had two more wins in 1963, the Cox Moore Tournament and the German Open, and finished the season third in the Order of Merit. He qualified for the 1963 Ryder Cup team in third place in the points list. Although the United States won the match 23 to 9, Huggett was the leading British scorer, with two wins and a half.

After his successes in 1962 and 1963, Huggett struggled for success from 1964 to 1966, a period that coincided with the introduction of the bigger ball in many tournaments. During this period he was, however, joint runner-up in the 1965 Open Championship at Royal Birkdale, an event played with the smaller ball. He finished two shots behind Australia's Peter Thomson.

Huggett returned to form in 1967, winning the PGA Close Championship and the Martini International in successive weeks, although he tied the Martini International with Malcolm Gregson. He qualified for the 1967 Ryder Cup team, finishing 7th in the points list. As in 1963, the British and Irish team was heavily defeated. Huggett beat Julius Boros in the morning singles matches but lost to Arnold Palmer in his afternoon match.

From 1968 to 1970 Huggett was a regular winner. In 1968, he won the Shell Winter Tournament, the Sumrie Tournament, the Martini International and the News of the World Match Play. He took Harry Vardon Trophy for leading the Order of Merit and played in the 1968 Piccadilly World Match Play Championship, losing to Arnold Palmer at the 36th hole. In 1969 Huggett won the Daks Tournament and was joint winner of the Bowmaker Tournament, finishing the season third in the 1969 Order of Merit. Huggett was in second place in the Ryder Cup standings to get an automatic place in the team. The Ryder Cup was tied at 16 points each. Playing the 18th hole in the last-but-one match, Huggett holed a putt to halve his match with Billy Casper. Just before making his putt he had heard a loud roar from the 17th green, where Tony Jacklin was playing Jack Nicklaus. Believing that Jacklin had beaten Nicklaus he thought that his putt had won the Ryder Cup. Only after leaving the green did he find out the Jacklin/Nicklaus match was still being played. In 1970 Huggett won the Algarve Open, the Carroll's International and the Dunlop Masters. He again finished 3rd in the Order of Merit. Huggett was ranked 10th in the world in McCormack's World Golf Rankings at the end of 1970, the rankings being based on performances from 1968 to 1970.

Huggett was joint winner of the 1971 Daks Tournament with Neil Coles, but dropped to 8th place in the Order of Merit. He was 7th in the points list for the 1971 Ryder Cup in St. Louis. Only the leading six got an automatic place but Huggett was one of the six others selected by the committee. The match was closer that the two previous matches Huggett had played in America, the United States winning by 5 points.

=== European Tour ===
Huggett played on the European Tour from its start in 1972. He won twice on the tour, the Portuguese Open in 1974 and the B.A./Avis Open in 1978. He was a runner-up six times, three of those in 1972 when he lost in a playoff for the Sunbeam Electric Scottish Open, and was solo second in the German Open and the Italian Open. He was the third in the Order of Merit in 1972 and 8th in 1974, his only two seasons in the top 10.

Huggett finished in 12th place in the points list for the 1973 Ryder Cup team for the match at Muirfield. Only the top 8 were guaranteed places, but the selection committee chose the players lying 9th to 12th in the list, giving Huggett a place in the team. Huggett's younger daughter, Sandra, was born on the morning of the opening day of the match. He was not selected for the opening foursomes but played with Maurice Bembridge in the afternoon fourballs, Huggett and Bembridge having an impressive 3&1 win over Jack Nicklaus and Arnold Palmer. The match was tied after two days but the United States dominated the two singles sessions. Huggett beat Homero Blancas in the singles and went through the contest undefeated. Huggett got a place in the 1975 Ryder Cup team by finishing in 8th place in the points list, with 8 being guaranteed places. He only played in two matches, winning a foursomes match with Tony Jacklin but losing to Gene Littler in the singles. 1975 was Huggett's last appearance in the Ryder Cup. In 6 contests he played 25 matches, winning 9, losing 10 and halving 6. In singles matches he had 3 wins, 3 defeats and 1 halved match. He was the non-playing captain in 1977, the last Ryder Cup before continental European players were included.

=== Senior career ===
Huggett played on the European Seniors Tour from its start in 1992, making his final appearances in 2007. He won 10 times on the tour between 1992 and 2000 including the 1993 PGA Seniors Championship and the 1998 Senior British Open. He won the PGA Seniors Championship at Sunningdale, by 3 strokes from Bobby Verwey. His biggest win was the 1998 Senior British Open at Royal Portrush, winning the first prize of £60,000. He had tied with Eddie Polland after the 72 holes, but won the playoff at the first extra hole after Polland had missed the green with his second shot and, after chipping onto the green, missed his putt from nine feet. Huggett had beaten Polland and Neil Coles in a playoff for the Schroder Senior Masters the previous week. His last win was in the 2000 Beko Classic at the age of 63 years and 171 days. Huggett finished in the top ten on the European Seniors Tour's Order of Merit every year from 1992 to 1996 and again in 1998, his best position being 2nd in 1993, 1994 and 1998.

Huggett was also a golf-course designer.

== Personal life and death ==
Huggett was married to Winnie and had two daughters. His daughter Sandra Huggett is an actress.

Huggett died on 22 September 2024, aged 87.

== Awards and honors ==
- Huggett was appointed a Member of the Order of the British Empire (MBE) in the 1978 Birthday Honours for his services to golf.
- In 2006, Huggett was inducted into the Welsh Sports Hall of Fame.

== Professional wins (34) ==
=== European Tour wins (2) ===
No.	Date	Tournament	Winning score	Margin of victory	Runner-up
1	13 Apr 1974	Portuguese Open	−4 (71-66-68-67=272)	4 strokes	(South Africa) John Fourie
2	4 Jun 1978	B.A./Avis Open	−13 (65-66-71-69=271)	3 strokes	(Republic of Ireland) Eamonn Darcy

European Tour playoff record (0–1)

No.	Year	Tournament	Opponent	Result
1	1972	Sunbeam Electric Scottish Open	(England) Neil Coles	Lost to birdie on second extra hole

=== Great Britain and Ireland wins (11) ===
Date	Tournament	Winning score	Margin of victory	Runner(s)-up	Ref.
27 Apr 1963	Cox Moore Tournament	72-68-70-66=276	1 stroke	(England) John Jacobs	
10 Jun 1967	PGA Close Championship	66-67-67-71=271	8 strokes	(England) Jimmy Hitchcock, (England) Bernard Hunt	
17 Jun 1967	Martini International	69-70-70-70=279	Tie	(England) Malcolm Gregson	
1 Jun 1968	Sumrie Tournament	69-75-70-68=282	4 strokes	(Spain) Ángel Gallardo	
15 Jun 1968	Martini International	72-69-66-71=278	2 strokes	(England) Tommy Horton	
8 Sep 1968	News of the World Match Play	1 up		(Scotland) John Panton	
31 May 1969	Daks Tournament	71-71-75-72=289	2 strokes	(Scotland) Bernard Gallacher	
1 Jul 1969	Bowmaker Tournament	68-67=135	Tie	(England) Tony Grubb	
21 Jun 1970	Carroll's International	68-68-69-74=279	7 strokes	(Republic of Ireland) Christy O'Connor Snr	
12 Sep 1970	Dunlop Masters	80-78-70-65=293	5 strokes	(Australia) David Graham	
5 Jun 1971	Daks Tournament	69-75-68-72=284	Tie	(England) Neil Coles	

=== Continental Europe wins (3) ===
Date	Tournament	Winning score	Margin of victory	Runner-up	Ref.
5 Aug 1962	Dutch Open	69-71-65-69=274	2 strokes	(Netherlands) Gerard de Wit	
11 Aug 1963	German Open	70-70-68-70=278	1 stroke	(England) Peter Alliss	
22 Mar 1970	Algarve Open	75-78-71-69=293	3 strokes	(Scotland) Andrew Brooks	

=== Other wins (8) ===
- 1957 Sunningdale Foursomes (with Ross Whitehead)
- 1961 Gleneagles Hotel Foursomes Tournament (with Martin Christmas)
- 1965 Smart Weston Tournament, Gleneagles Hotel Foursomes Tournament (with Michael Burgess)
- 1968 Shell Winter Tournament
- 1969 Turnberry-B.O.A.C. Foursomes Tournament (with Colin Cowdrey)
- 1972 Sumrie Better-Ball (with Malcolm Gregson)
- 1978 Rank-Xerox Welsh Professional Championship

=== Senior PGA Tour wins (1) ===
Legend
Senior major championships (1)
Other Senior PGA Tour (0)

No.	Date	Tournament	Winning score	Margin of victory	Runner-up
1	9 Aug 1998	Senior British Open	−5 (71-70-71-71=283)	Playoff	(Northern Ireland) Eddie Polland

Senior PGA Tour playoff record (1–0)

No.	Year	Tournament	Opponent	Result
1	1998	Senior British Open	(Northern Ireland) Eddie Polland	Won with par on first extra hole

=== European Seniors Tour wins (10) ===
Legend
Senior major championships (1)
Other European Seniors Tour (9)

No.	Date	Tournament	Winning score	Margin of victory	Runner(s)-up
1	26 Apr 1992	Gary Player Anvil Senior Classic	+5 (76-74-71=221)	Playoff	(England) Tommy Horton
2	30 Aug 1992	Northern Electric Seniors	+8 (75-74-75=224)	Playoff	(Puerto Rico) David Jimenez
3	13 Jun 1993	Northern Electric Seniors (2)	−1 (73-34=107) (Note: Shortened to 27 holes due to weather.)	1 stroke	(England) Tommy Horton, (England) Brian Waites
4	7 Aug 1993	Forte PGA Seniors Championship	−6 (69-65-70=204)	3 strokes	(South Africa) Bobby Verwey
5	22 May 1994	La Manga Spanish Seniors Open	−1 (72-74-69=215)	Playoff	(England) Malcolm Gregson, (England) David Snell
6	1 Apr 1995	Windsor Senior Masters	−7 (70-67-72=209)	1 stroke	(Spain) Antonio Garrido
7	3 Sep 1995	Shell Scottish Seniors Open	−10 (64-70-66=200)	2 strokes	(England) Neil Coles
8	2 Aug 1998	Schroder Senior Masters	−7 (72-71-66=209)	Playoff	(England) Neil Coles, (Northern Ireland) Eddie Polland
9	9 Aug 1998	Senior British Open	−5 (71-70-71-71=283)	Playoff	(Northern Ireland) Eddie Polland
10	7 May 2000	Beko Classic	−8 (69-68-71=208)	Playoff	(Australia) Bob Shearer

European Seniors Tour playoff record (6–1)

No.	Year	Tournament	Opponent(s)	Result
1	1992	Gary Player Anvil Senior Classic	(England) Tommy Horton	Won with par on fourth extra hole
2	1992	Northern Electric Seniors	(Puerto Rico) David Jimenez	Won with par on first extra hole
3	1994	La Manga Spanish Seniors Open	(England) Malcolm Gregson, (England) David Snell	Won with eagle on first extra hole
4	1996	Castle Royle European Seniors Classic	(England) Tommy Horton	Lost to birdie on first extra hole
5	1998	Schroder Senior Masters	(England) Neil Coles, (Northern Ireland) Eddie Polland	Won with birdie on first extra hole
6	1998	Senior British Open	(Northern Ireland) Eddie Polland	Won with par on first extra hole
7	2000	Beko Classic	(Australia) Bob Shearer	Won with par on first extra hole

== Playoff record ==
Far East Circuit playoff record (0–1)

No.	Year	Tournament	Opponent	Result
1	1967	Hong Kong Open	(Australia) Peter Thomson	Lost to par on second extra hole

== Results in major championships ==
Tournament	1961	1962	1963	1964	1965	1966	1967	1968	1969
Masters Tournament									CUT
The Open Championship	T25	T3	T14	CUT	T2	T43	T25	T13	T16

Tournament	1970	1971	1972	1973	1974	1975	1976	1977	1978	1979
Masters Tournament										
The Open Championship	T28	T25	T26	CUT	CUT	T40	CUT	T48	CUT	CUT

Top 10

CUT = missed the half-way cut (3rd round cut in 1973, 1974 and 1978 Open Championships)
"T" indicates a tie for a place
Note: Huggett never played in the U.S. Open or PGA Championship.

== Senior major championships ==
=== Wins (1) ===
Year	Championship	Winning score	Margin	Runner-up
1998	Senior British Open	−5 (71-70-71-71=283)	Playoff^{1}	(Northern Ireland) Eddie Polland

^{1}Defeated Polland with a par at the first hole of a sudden-death playoff.

== Team appearances ==
- Ryder Cup (representing Great Britain and Ireland): 1963, 1967, 1969 (tie), 1971, 1973, 1975, 1977 (non-playing captain)
- World Cup (representing Wales): 1963, 1964, 1965, 1968, 1969, 1970, 1971, 1976, 1979
- R.T.V. International Trophy (representing Wales): 1967
- Double Diamond International (representing Wales): 1971, 1972, 1973, 1974 (captain), 1975, 1976, 1977 (captain)
- Marlboro Nations' Cup (representing Wales): 1972, 1973
- Sotogrande Match/Hennessy Cognac Cup (representing Great Britain and Ireland): 1974 (winners, captain), 1978 (winners, captain)
- Praia d'El Rey European Cup (representing the European Seniors Tour): 1998 (tie)

== See also ==
- List of golfers with most European Senior Tour wins
