= John Fourie =

South African professional golfer

Personal information
- Full name: Jonathan Adriaan Fourie
- Nationality: South Africa
- Born: 23 August 1939 (age 87) Johannesburg, South Africa
- Height: 1.83 m (6 ft 0 in)

Career
- Sport: Golf
- Turned professional: 1970
- Former tours: European Tour; Southern Africa Tour; European Seniors Tour
- Professional wins: 13

Number of wins by tour
- European Tour: 1
- Sunshine Tour: 6
- PGA Tour Champions: 1
- European Senior Tour: 2
- Other: 4

Best results in major championships
- Masters Tournament: DNP
- PGA Championship: DNP
- U.S. Open: DNP
- The Open Championship: T15: 1976

Achievements and awards
- European Seniors Tour Order of Merit winner: 1992

Jonathan Adriaan Fourie (born 23 August 1939) is a South African professional golfer.

== Career ==
In 1939, Fourie was born in Johannesburg. In 1970, as an amateur, Fourie won the South African Masters.

In 1970, Fourie turned professional. He spent his career playing mainly on the Southern Africa Tour and the European Tour. He won ten times on the Southern Africa Tour, including one win as an amateur, and led the Order of Merit in 1973/74.

In Europe, he won the 1977 Callers of Newcastle tournament and twice finished in the top twenty on the Order of Merit. In 1992, he joined the European Seniors Tour during its 1992 debut season, and won the Senior British Open and the Belfast Telegraph Irish Senior Masters on his way to winning the tour's Order of Merit. He continued to play on the seniors tour into his mid-60s.

== Professional wins (13) ==
=== European Tour wins (1) ===
No.	Date	Tournament	Winning score	Margin of victory	Runners-up
1	31 Jul 1977	Callers of Newcastle	−6 (66-71-74-71=282)	Playoff	(England) Peter Butler, (Spain) Ángel Gallardo, (England) Tommy Horton

European Tour playoff record (1–0)

No.	Year	Tournament	Opponents	Result
1	1977	Callers of Newcastle	(England) Peter Butler, (Spain) Ángel Gallardo, (England) Tommy Horton	Won with par on second extra hole Butler and Horton eliminated by par on first hole

=== Southern Africa Tour wins (6) ===
No.	Date	Tournament	Winning score	Margin of victory	Runner(s)-up
1	1 Jan 1972	State Mines Open	−17 (70-65-67-69=271)	5 strokes	(South Africa) John Bland
2	20 Jan 1973	ICL Transvaal Open	−4 (69-73-69-69=280)	Playoff	(South Africa) Allan Henning
3	27 Jan 1973	Rothmans International Strokeplay	E (73-70-70=213)*	1 stroke	(South Africa) Tienie Britz
4	12 Jan 1974	NCR Western Province Open	−11 (71-69-68-69=277)	7 strokes	(South Africa) Cobie Legrange
5	11 Jan 1975	Vavasseur Natal Open	−7 (68-69-71-73=281)	1 stroke	(South Africa) Hugh Baiocchi, (South Africa) Dave Wren
6	25 Jan 1975	Dunlop South African Masters	−11 (69-65-65=199)*	1 stroke	(South Africa) Vin Baker, (South Africa) Allan Henning

*Note: Tournament shortened to 54 holes due to weather.

Southern Africa Tour playoff record (1–2)

No.	Year	Tournament	Opponent	Result
1	1973	ICL Transvaal Open	(South Africa) Allan Henning	Won with par on ninth extra hole
2	1975	Holiday Inns Open	(South Africa) Dale Hayes	Lost to par on fourth extra hole
3	1976	BP South African Open	(South Africa) Dale Hayes	Lost 18-hole playoff; Hayes: −3 (69), Fourie: E (72)

=== Rhodesian circuit wins (1) ===
- 1971 Solar Open (Rhodesia)

=== Other Southern African wins (3) ===
- 1970 South African Masters (as an amateur)
- 1977 Newcastle Open, Botswana Pro-Am Open

=== Senior PGA Tour wins (1) ===
Legend
Senior major championships (1)
Other Senior PGA Tour (0)

No.	Date	Tournament	Winning score	Margin of victory	Runners-up
1	26 Jul 1992	Senior British Open	−2 (75-67-71-69=282)	3 strokes	(New Zealand) Bob Charles, (England) Neil Coles

=== European Seniors Tour wins (2) ===
Legend
Senior major championships (1)
Other European Senior Tour (1)

No.	Date	Tournament	Winning score	Margin of victory	Runner(s)-up
1	26 Jul 1992	Senior British Open	−2 (75-67-71-69=282)	3 strokes	(New Zealand) Bob Charles, (England) Neil Coles
2	23 Aug 1992	Belfast Telegraph Irish Senior Masters	−3 (71-70-69=210)	4 strokes	(South Africa) Vincent Tshabalala

European Seniors Tour playoff record (0–2)

No.	Year	Tournament	Opponents	Result
1	1993	Senior Zurich Lexus Trophy	(England) Tommy Horton, (Puerto Rico) David Jimenez	Horton won with birdie on first extra hole
2	2000	Lawrence Batley Seniors	(England) Neil Coles, (Scotland) David Huish	Huish won with par on first extra hole

== Results in major championships ==
Tournament	1971	1972	1973	1974	1975	1976	1977	1978
The Open Championship	CUT		T49	T59		T15	T22	CUT

Note: Fourie only played in The Open Championship.

Did not play

CUT = missed the half-way cut
"T" = tied

== Senior major championships ==
=== Wins (1) ===
Year	Championship	Winning score	Margin	Runners-up
1992	Senior British Open	−2 (75-67-71-69=282)	3 strokes	(New Zealand) Bob Charles, (England) Neil Coles

== Team appearances ==
Amateur

- Eisenhower Trophy (representing South Africa): 1966, 1968, 1970
- Commonwealth Tournament (representing South Africa): 1967
- Professional
- Datsun International (representing South Africa): 1976 (winners)
