= 2024 Senior Open Championship =

Tournament information
- Dates: 25–28 July 2024
- Location: Carnoustie, Scotland, United Kingdom; 56.497°N 2.717°W
- Course: Carnoustie Golf Links (Championship Course)
- Organised by: The R&A
- Tours: European Senior Tour; PGA Tour Champions
- Format: 72 holes stroke play

Statistics
- Par: 72
- Length: 7,402 yd (6,768 m)
- Field: 154 players
- Cut: 151 (74 players)
- Prize fund: US$2,850,000
- Winner's share: US$447,800

Champion
- (South Korea) K. J. Choi
- 278 (−10)

Location map
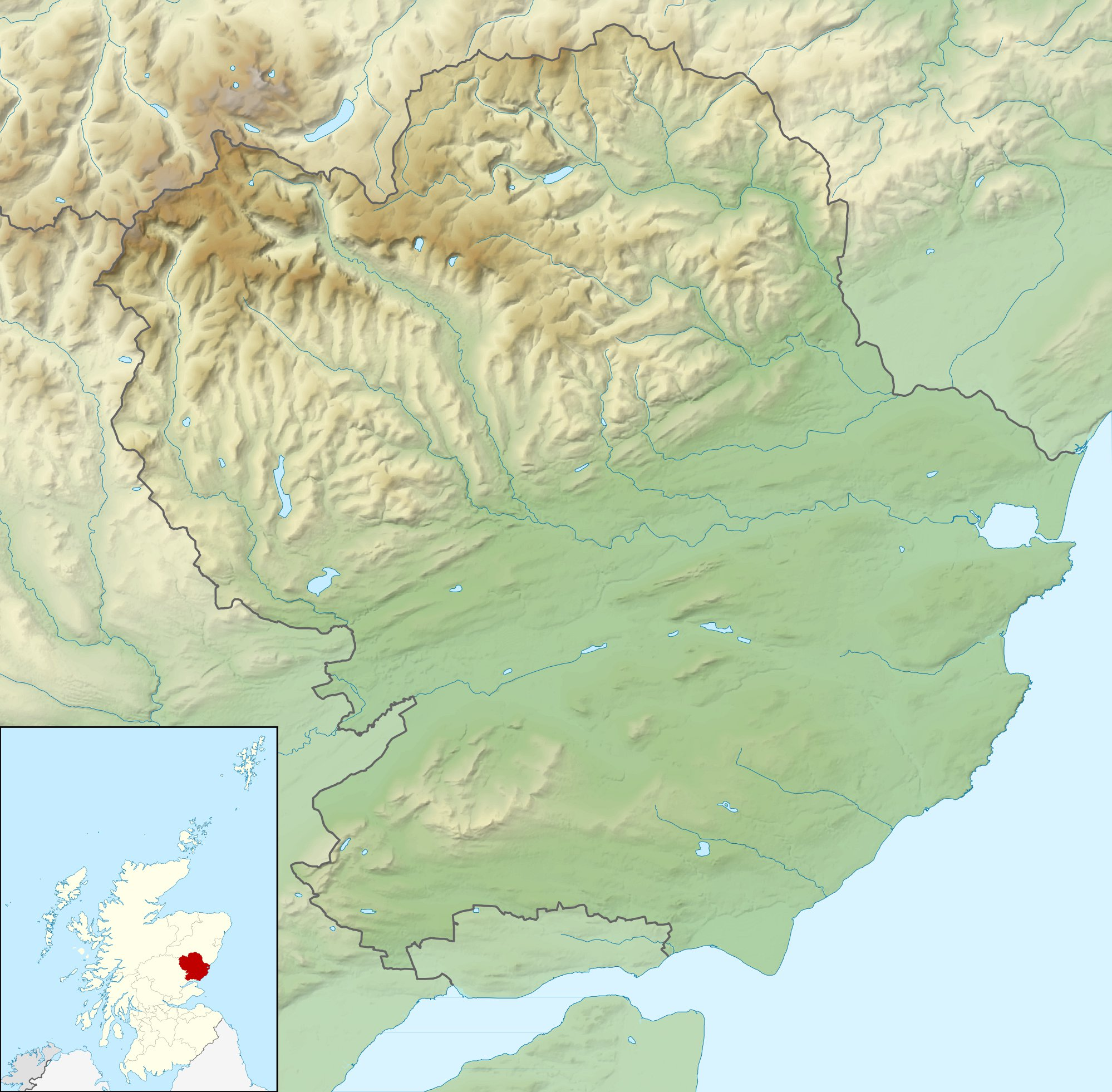
- Location in the United Kingdom Location in Scotland Location in Angus, Scotland

The 2024 Senior Open Championship, by sponsor reasons named The Senior Open presented by Rolex, was a senior major golf championship for players aged 50 and over. It was the 37th Senior Open Championship. It was held 25–28 July at Carnoustie Golf Links in Carnoustie, Angus, Scotland. It was the 21st Senior Open Championship played as a senior major championship.

== Venue ==
The 2024 event was the third Senior Open Championship played at the Carnoustie Golf Links. The previous event was in 2016, with Paul Broadhurst winning his first of two senior major championships.

=== Championship Course ===
Championship scorecard:

Hole	Name	Yards	Par	Hole	Name	Yards	Par
1	Cup	396	4	10	South America	465	4
2	Gulley	461	4	11	John Philp	382	4
3	Jockey's Burn	350	4	12	Southward Ho	503	5
4	Hillocks	415	4	13	Whins	175	3
5	Brae	412	4	14	Spectacles	513	5
6	Hogan's Alley	580	5	15	Lucky Slap	472	4
7	Plantation	410	4	16	Barry Burn	248	3
8	Short	187	3	17	Island	460	4
9	Railway	474	4	18	Home	499	4
Out		3,685	36	In		3,717	36
Source:				Total		7,402	72

Length of the course for previous Senior Open Championships at Carnoustie Championship Course:

- 2016: 7,345 yards (6,716 m), par 72
- 2010: 7,297 yards (6,672 m), par 71
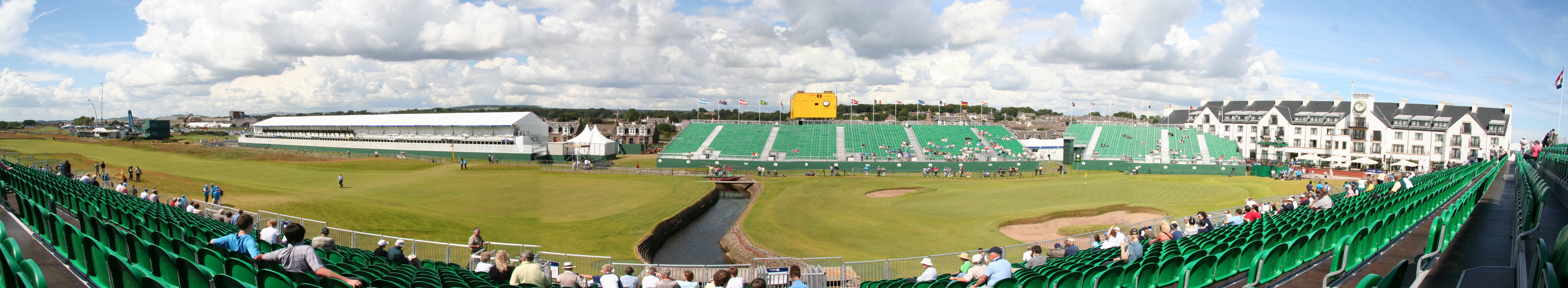
The 18th hole at Carnoustie and the Barry Burn.

== Field ==
The field of 154 competitors included 149 professionals and five amateurs, either exempt via different criteria or advancing from qualifying competitions. (Note: (a) – denotes amateur)

=== Exemptions ===
130 exempt players, 127 professionals and three amateurs, participated.

Former winners of The Senior Open aged 65 or under

- Russ Cochran, Paul Broadhurst, Miguel Ángel Jiménez, Stephen Dodd, Darren Clarke, Alex Čejka

Former winners of the Masters Tournament, PGA Championship, U.S. Open and The Open Championship aged 65 or under

- José María Olazábal, Vijay Singh, Pádraig Harrington, Ángel Cabrera, John Daly, (Note: Daly withdrew shortly before the start of the first round and was not replaced.) Rich Beem, Shaun Micheel, Y.E. Yang, Retief Goosen, Michael Campbell, Justin Leonard, Paul Lawrie

Top 60 players on the career money list (including the Legends Tour, the European Tour and the Challenge Tour)

- Colin Montgomerie, Thomas Bjørn, Robert Karlsson, Raphaël Jacquelin, Paul McGinley, Bernhard Langer, (Note: Due to being aged over 65, Bernhard Langer and Ian Woosnam were not exempt under category 1 or 2, but were still exempt under category 3.) Ian Woosnam, Niclas Fasth, Richard Green, Bradley Dredge, Philip Price, Thomas Levet, Jeev Milkha Singh, Peter O'Malley, Ricardo González, Simon Khan, Gary Orr, Peter Lawrie, James Kingston, Mark McNulty, Peter Fowler, Peter Baker, Jarmo Sandelin, Joakim Haeggman, Marcus Brier, Jean-François Remésy, Jean van de Velde, Alex Čejka, Miguel Ángel Martín

Top 60 players on the PGA Tour Champions all-time money list

- Jerry Kelly, K. J. Choi, Fred Funk, Stuart Appleby, Jeff Sluman, Stephen Ames, Jeff Maggert, Chad Campbell, Kirk Triplett, Bob Estes, Tom Pernice Jr., Joe Durant, Scott McCarron, John Senden, Paul Goydos, Tim Herron, Rod Pampling

The leading 20 players, not otherwise exempt on the closing date, on the Legends Tour Order of Merit for 2023

- Phillip Archer, Michael Jonzon, Greig Hutcheon, Keith Horne, Greg Owen, Emanuele Canonica, Michael Long, Robert Coles, Andrew Raitt, Thomas Gögele, Paul Streeter, Jason Norris, Paul Eales, Van Phillips, Lionel Alexander, Philip Golding, David Shacklady, Christian Cévaër, Andrew Marshall

The leading 20 players, not otherwise exempt on the closing date, on the Charles Schwab Cup points list for 2023

- Dicky Pride, Paul Stankowski, Mark Hensby, Rob Labritz, Tim Petrovic, Charlie Wi, Shane Bertsch, Tim O'Neil, Glen Day, Scott Parel, Matt Gogel, David Branshaw, David McKenzie, Wes Short Jr., Arjun Atwal, Jason Bohn

Players finishing in positions 1–15, and those tying for 15th place, in the 2023 Senior Open Championship

- Euan McIntosh, Steven Alker, Mario Tiziani, John Kemp (a), Tom Gillis

Winners of official tournaments on the Legends Tour or PGA Tour Champions since The 2023 Senior Open

- Patrik Sjöland, Brett Quigley, Scott Dunlap, Doug Barron, Clark Dennis, Adilson da Silva

Winners of official tournaments on the European Tour or PGA Tour, when aged 50 years on 24 July 2024

- Scott Drummond, Ted Purdy, Greg Chalmers, Jason Gore, Mikael Lundberg, Stephen Allan, Joe Ogilvie, Daniel Chopra, Chris Riley, Eric Axley, Heath Slocum

Past members of Ryder Cup or Presidents Cup teams aged 50 on 24 July 2024

- Boo Weekley, Brett Wetterich

Winners of the Senior PGA Championship 2019–2024

- Ken Tanigawa

The leading two players, not otherwise exempt, in the top 10 of the Japan PGA Senior Tour money list for 2023

- Prayad Marksaeng, Hiroyuki Fujita

The first four players, and those tying for 4th place, who are not otherwise exempt, in the top 30 of the current Legends Tour Order of Merit

- Jyoti Randhawa

The Senior Amateur champion for 2024

- Todd White (a)

The European Senior Men’s Amateur champion for 2023

- Rodrigo Lacerda Soares (a)

=== Qualifying ===
24 places were available to players not qualified under the exemption categories.

One 18-hole stroke play qualifying event took place on 8 July, at Firestone Country Club (Fazio Course), Akron, Ohio, United States, where 137 players competed for five places and three alternate spots. Six places came available, why the first alternate also qualified.

Four 18-hole stroke play qualifying events took place on Monday 22 July at four venues in Scotland; Downfield Golf Club in Dundee (five spots), Panmure Golf Club in Carnoustie (five spots), the Medal Course at Monifieth Golf Links (four spots) and 1562 course at Montrose Golf Links (four spots).

=== Qualifying competitions and qualifiers ===
8 July at Firestone Country Club (Fazio Course), Akron, Ohio, United States

- Jay Jurecic, Ryan Jansa, Jason Perry, Donald Carpenter III, Omar Uresti, Guy Boros (alternates: Anthony Rodriguez, Bob Sowards)

22 July at Downfield Golf Club, Dundee, Panmure Golf Club, Carnoustie, the Medal Course at Monifieth Golf Links and 1562 course at Montrose Golf Links

- Barry Austin, Notah Begay III, Barry Conser, Hidetomo Sato, Roderick Bastard

22 July at Panmure Golf Club, Carnoustie

- Andrew Oldcorn, Cameron Clark, Scott Henderson, Craig Shaw (a), Michael Wright

22 July at the Medal Course at Monifieth Golf Links

- José Manuel Carriles, Fran Quinn, Neil Rowlands (a), Peter Wilson

22 July at 1562 course at Montrose Golf Links

- Carlos Balmaseda, Garry Houston, Doug McGuigan, Chris Gane

== Round summaries ==
=== First round ===
Thursday, 25 July 2024

Place	Player	Score	To par
1	(Canada) Stephen Ames	68	−4
T2	(England) Peter Baker	69	−3
T2	(England) Paul Broadhurst	69	−3
T2	(South Korea) K. J. Choi	69	−3
T2	(Australia) Richard Green	69	−3
6	(Australia) Scott Hend	70	−2
T7	(New Zealand) Steven Alker	71	−1
T7	(Denmark) Thomas Bjørn	71	−1
T7	(Austria) Markus Brier	71	−1
T7	(Italy) Emanuele Canonica	71	−1
T7	(Spain) José Manuel Carriles	71	−1
T7	(Wales) Bradley Dredge	71	−1
T7	(South Africa) Retief Goosen	71	−1
T7	(United States) Jason Gore	71	−1
T7	(Republic of Ireland) Pádraig Harrington	71	−1
T7	(Republic of Ireland) Peter Lawrie	71	−1
T7	(Spain) Miguel Ángel Martín	71	−1
T7	(United States) Fran Quinn	71	−1

=== Second round ===
Friday, 26 July 2024

74 players, all professionals, made the 36-hole cut at +7. Among notable players making the cut was the 1999 Open winner at Carnoustie Paul Lawrie, while the two players losing the playoff in 1999, Justin Leonard and Jean van de Velde, both missed the cut. The only other participating Open Championship winner at Carnoustie, the 2007 winner Pádraig Harrington, also made the cut.

Place	Player	Score	To par
1	(South Korea) K. J. Choi	69-69=138	−6
2	(Canada) Stephen Ames	68-72=140	−4
T3	(Australia) Richard Green	69-72=141	−3
T3	(Republic of Ireland) Pádraig Harrington	71-70=141	−3
5	(Spain) Miguel Ángel Martín	71-71=142	−2
T6	(India) Arjun Atwal	75-68=143	−1
T6	(England) Peter Baker	69-74=143	−1
T6	(England) Paul Broadhurst	69-74=143	−1
T6	(Argentina) Ángel Cabrera	73-70=143	−1
T6	(Northern Ireland) Darren Clarke	74-69=143	−1

=== Third round ===
Saturday, 27 July 2024

K. J. Choi kept his solo lead after 54 holes, despite making two double bogeys in a row on holes 15 and 16. He finished the round with a birdie on the 18th hole. The best round of the day and of the best round of the tournament so far belonged to Arjun Atwal, who shot 67 and advanced to third place, two strokes behind the leader.

Place	Player	Score	To par
1	(South Korea) K. J. Choi	69-69-70=208	−8
2	(Australia) Richard Green	69-72–68=209	−7
3	(India) Arjun Atwal	75-68-67=210	−6
4	(England) Paul Broadhurst	69-74-69=212	−4
5	(Argentina) Ángel Cabrera	73-70-70=213	−3
T6	(Canada) Stephen Ames	68-72-74=214	−2
T6	(Republic of Ireland) Pádraig Harrington	71-70-73=214	−2
T8	(New Zealand) Steven Alker	71-73-71=215	−1
T8	(Spain) Miguel Ángel Martín	71-71-73=215	−1
T10	(Argentina) Ricardo González	75-70-71=216	E
T10	(Germany) Bernhard Langer	74-70-72=216	E
T10	(Scotland) Paul Lawrie	75-70-71=216	E

=== Final round ===
Sunday, 28 July 2024

54-year-old K. J. Choi kept the lead he held after both the second and third round and won the tournament, becoming the first South Korean player to win a senior major championship, men or women. After birdies on the 12th and 13th holes and an eagle on the 14th hole, Choi reached a four-shot-lead. He finally finished two shots ahead of runner-up Richard Green, who played the last three holes 2 under par. Defending champion Alex Čejka finished tied 15th, 12 strokes behind the winner.

Place	Player	Score	To par	Money ($)
1	(South Korea) K. J. Choi	69-69-70-70=278	−10	447,800
2	(Australia) Richard Green	69-72-68-71=280	−8	298,680
3	(England) Paul Broadhurst	69-74-69-70=282	−6	168,036
4	(Canada) Stephen Ames	68-72-74-71=285	−3	134,292
T5	(New Zealand) Steven Alker	71-73-71-71=286	−2	74,067
T5	(India) Arjun Atwal	75-68-67-76=286	−2	74,067
T5	(Denmark) Thomas Bjørn	71-73-73-69=286	−2	74,067
T5	(Argentina) Ángel Cabrera	73-70-70-73=286	−2	74,067
T5	(Republic of Ireland) Pádraig Harrington	71-70-73-72=286	−2	74,067
T5	(Germany) Bernhard Langer	74-70-72-70=286	−2	74,067
T5	(Spain) Miguel Ángel Martín	71-71-73-71=286	−2	74,067

== Notes ==
Preceded by 2024 U.S. Senior Open	Senior Major Championships	Succeeded by 2025
