= Carnoustie (disambiguation) =

Carnoustie may refer to:

- Carnoustie, a town and former royal burgh in Angus, Scotland
  - Carnoustie Golf Links, that town's golf links, which is one of the venues in the Open Championship rotation. It is officially known as Carnoustie Golf Links, but is more often referred to simply as "Carnoustie".
