= Barry Burn =

Minor river in Angus, Scotland

Barry Burn Pitairlie Burn
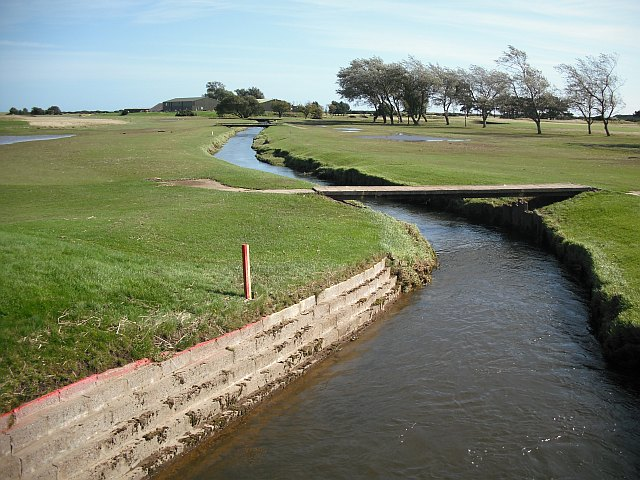
- Barry Burn at the Burnside Golf Course, Carnoustie

Location
- Country: Scotland

Physical characteristics
- Source: Dodd Hill
  - location: Sidlaw Hills, Angus, UK
  - coordinates: 56°32′36.6504″N 2°52′29.6724″W
  - elevation: 195 m (640 ft)
- Mouth: Carnoustie Golf Links, North Sea
  - location: Carnoustie, UK
  - coordinates: 56°29′39.1884″N 2°42′58.4166″W
  - elevation: 0 m (0 ft)

The Barry Burn, otherwise known as Pitairlie Burn is a minor river in Angus, Scotland. It rises in the eastern portion of the Sidlaw Hills and flows past Newbigging, through Barry and the western part of Carnoustie, before taking a meandering course through Carnoustie Golf Links.

The burn passes (and is the power source for) Barry Mill, one of only two remaining water-powered mills in Scotland, now owned by the National Trust for Scotland.
