= Barry Mill =

Category A listed watermill in Barry, Angus in eastern Scotland

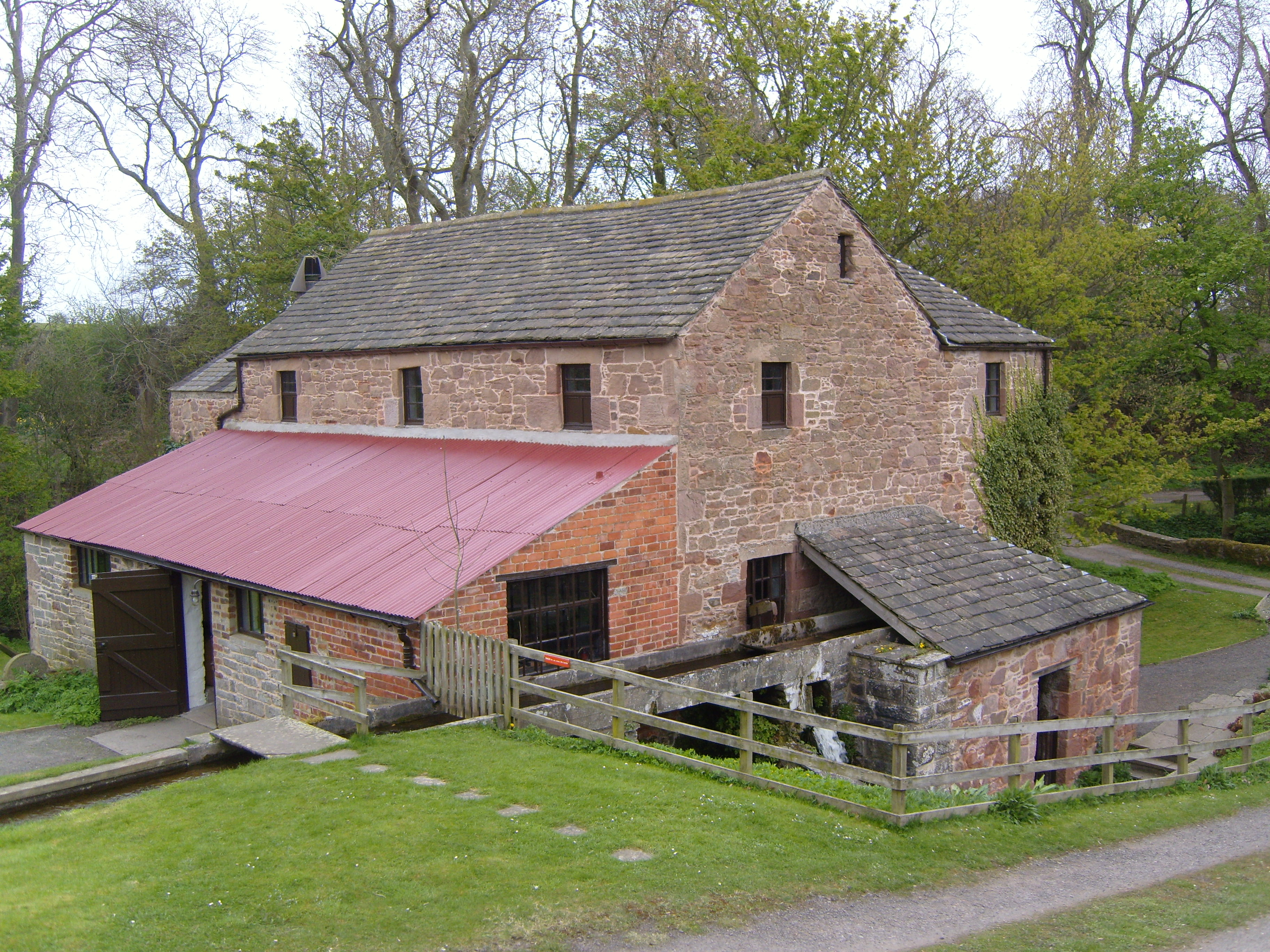

- Location within Scotland
- Former name: Owned by Balmerino Abbey in Fife
- Established: 1539
- Coordinates: 56°30′16″N 2°45′30″W
- Type: Watermill
- Website: Mill Website

Barry Mill is a working Category A listed watermill in Barry, Angus in eastern Scotland. It is owned and operated by the National Trust for Scotland as an educational tourist attraction. Situated in a secluded area beside the Barry Burn (the watercourse, which provides its power), the mill lies about half a mile north of the village of Barry, near the town of Carnoustie. It is a three floor building, containing a meal floor (basement), a milling floor and a top (or "bin floor"). A site for several mills since at least 1539, Barry Mill was commercially operational until 1984; it was then restored, and has been operated by the Trust since 1992. It was threatened with closure in March 2009, but has remained open due to local support, and the securing of external funding.

== Operation ==
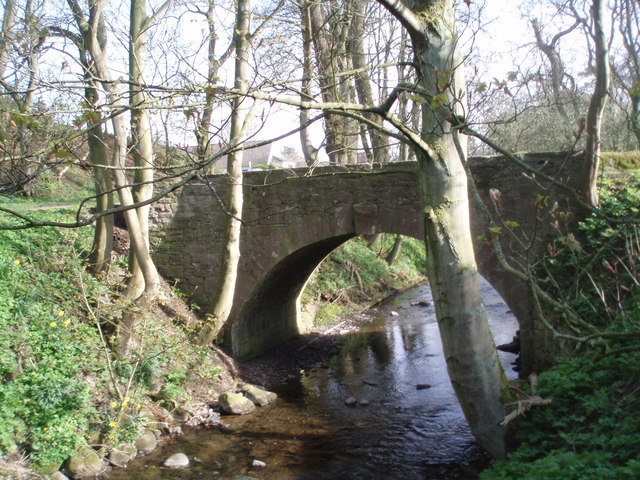
Barry Burn

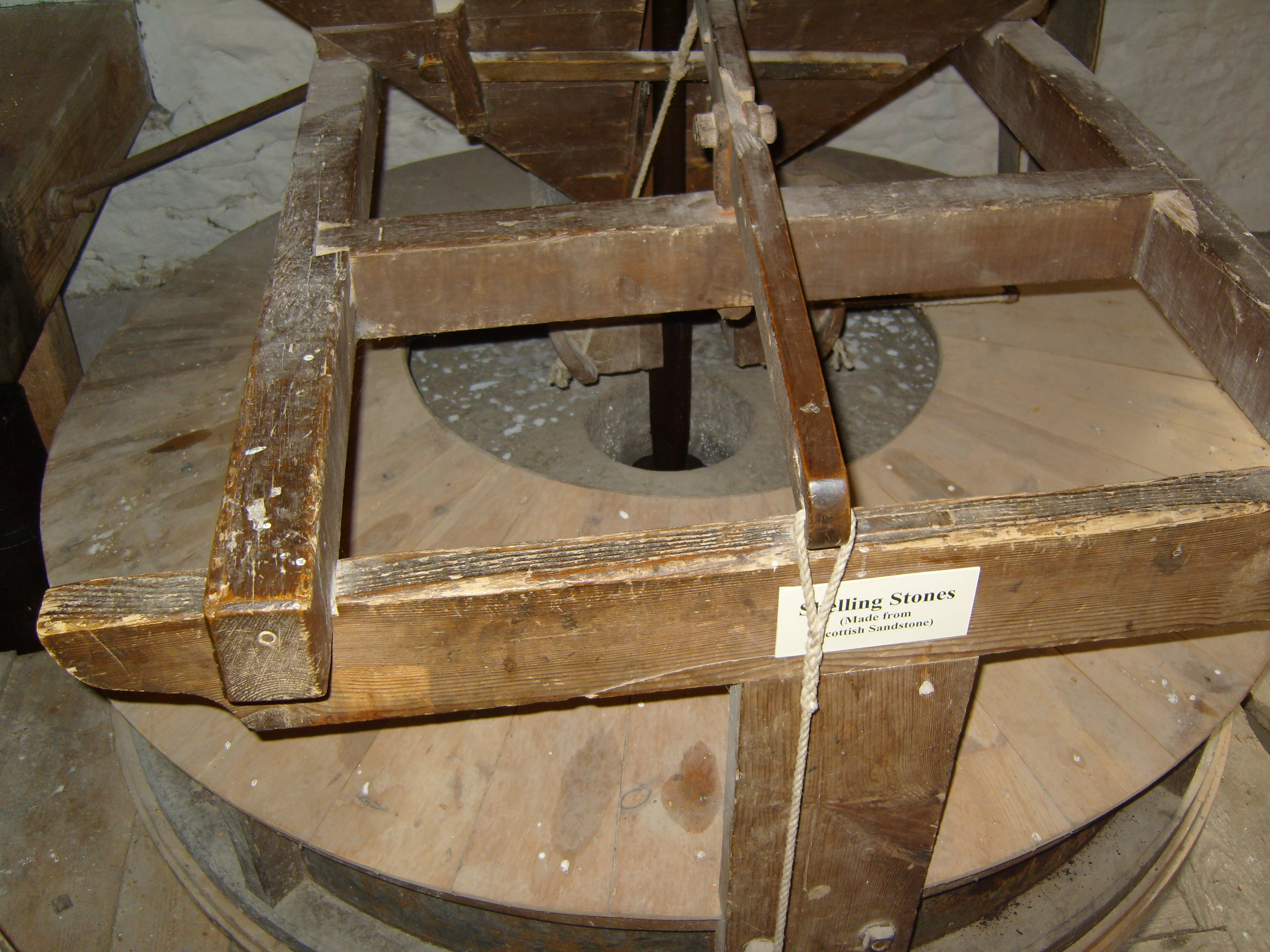
Sandstone millstones

When in operation, the mill processes oats into oatmeal. (Oatmeal being a staple foodstuff, that in the past commonly formed part of the basic diet in Scotland.) Originally, the oats arrived in sacks from the neighbouring farms and had already been threshed. (There is an example of traditional threshing machine on display at the mill.) The oats were then dried in the mill's peat-fired kiln and then sent down a chute to the meal floor to be collected in sacks again. Today the oats arrive already processed, but the rest of the milling continues in the traditional style.

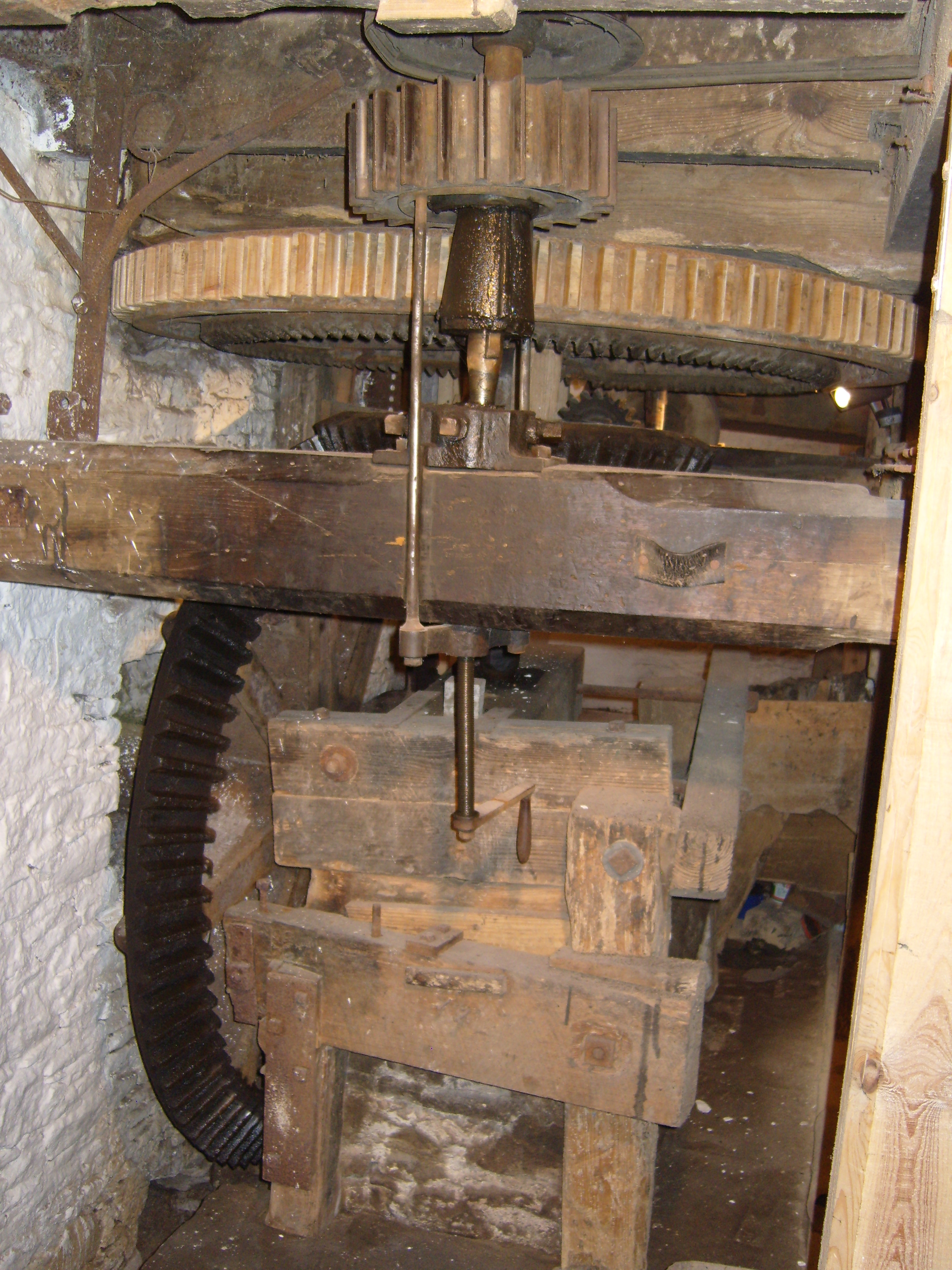
The cog pit, showing the pit wheel (left), great spur wheel and a stone nut.

The oats are hoisted to the bin floor at the top of the mill, from where they are emptied into a hopper that feeds one of the mill's two pairs of millstones situated on the mill floor. This pair of sandstone millstones shells the grain, and the output is then sent down a chute to the basement where the shelled oats ("groats") are separated from the husks using a fan. The groats are then hoisted back to the top floor and fed through the second pair of millstones (made of French burr stone). This produces the oatmeal, which descends to the basement for bagging.

The mill is powered by the Barry Burn: there is a working dam and lade half a mile upstream, which channel water to the mill wheel. The wheel is 15 feet 6 inches (4.72 m) diameter, and is powered by the water dropping down from the lade on downstream side of the overshot waterwheel . The mill's power is controlled by a series of levers, cogs and gears in the basement. These supply power to the millstones, to the hoists, and to a fan that is used to separate the groats from the chaff.

== History ==
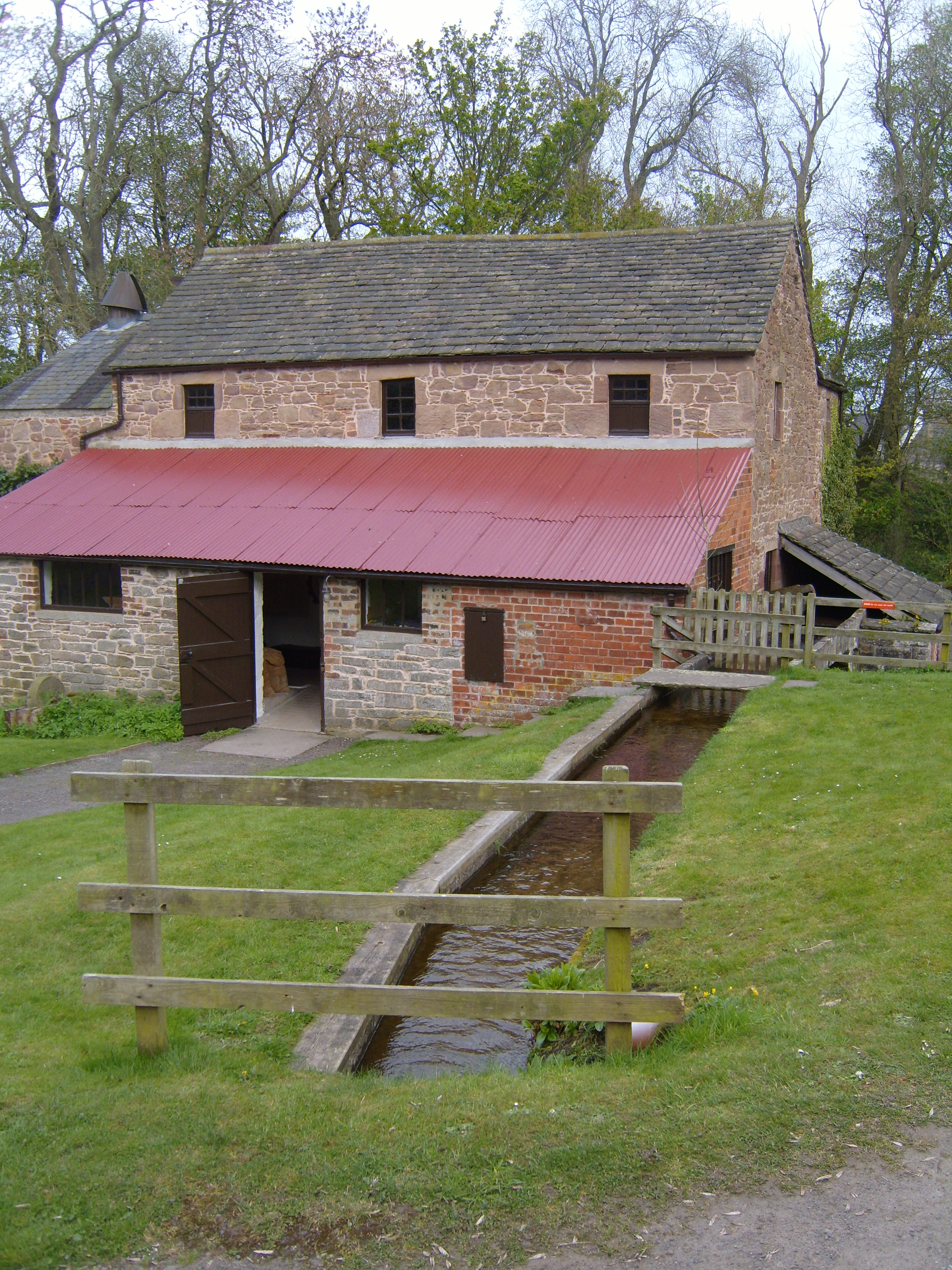
The mill and its lade

The earliest reference to a mill on this site dates from 1539. Indeed, there were originally two mills on the Barry Burn, both owned by Balmerino Abbey in Fife: a corn mill ("the Nether Mill") and an oat mill ("the Over Mill"). The properties of the abbey were annexed by the crown in 1587 as a result of the Scottish Reformation, and were granted to James Elphinstone, 1st Lord Balmerino in 1605. The mills were sold to a Robert Watson in the late 17th century and subsequently inherited by Watson's son-in-law, Robert Gardyne in the 1680s.

Milling at the Nether Mill was discontinued and the structure, dating to 1783, is now used as a store building. In 1814, the Over Mill (which became known simply as "Barry Mill") was destroyed by a fire and the today's structure dates from its rebuilding by the owner, Thomas Gardyne of Middleton and Barry. The mill was purchased by the Gunn family in 1926 before being further extended in the 1930s. Barry Mill continued to produce oatmeal until the late 1970s. After that time it was used only to produce animal feed, until flood damage to the mill lade finally ended commercial operations in 1984.

The derelict mill was acquired by the National Trust for Scotland in 1988, and was fully restored over the next four years, to the condition it had enjoyed in 1814). It was reopened by the Trust in 1992, and has since operated on a demonstration basis. Demonstrations are offered at weekends or for parties by prior arrangement, although the mill is also operational at other times. The mill's stables have been converted into a visitor centre, and the mill itself also contains displays about the life and work of both mill and millers.

The mill and the nearby bridge which was part of the old road from Barry Grange to Panbride were both granted Category B listed buildings status by Historic Scotland in 1971. The Nether Mill building was granted Category C listing in 1980.

Barry Mill was granted category A listing in December 2009.

=== Closure threat ===
In 2009, the mill was one of the least visited of the Trust's properties, attracting about 2,000 annual visitors. In March 2009, the Trust, facing financial difficulties, listed the loss-making Barry Mill as one of 11 of its properties threatened with immediate closure, unless external sponsorship could be found. The intention was to "moth-ball" the mill until financial circumstances were better. On 25 March, at a public meeting, "Friends of Barry Mill" was formed in an attempt to raise funds and to campaign to save the mill. In July 2009, the Trust announced that the property would continue to operate "for the foreseeable future" and that this was made possible due to support pledged by Angus Council and the Gibson Graham Charitable Trust.
