= 2010 Senior Open Championship =

Tournament information
- Dates: 22–25 July 2010
- Location: Carnoustie, Scotland; 56.497°N 2.717°W
- Course: Carnoustie Golf Links
- Organised by: The R&A
- Tours: European Senior Tour; Champions Tour
- Format: 72 holes stroke play

Statistics
- Par: 71
- Length: 7,297 yd (6,672 m)
- Field: 144 players, 73 after cut
- Cut: 149 (+7)
- Prize fund: $2,000,000 £1,250,000

Champion
- (Germany) Bernhard Langer
- 279 (−5)

Location map
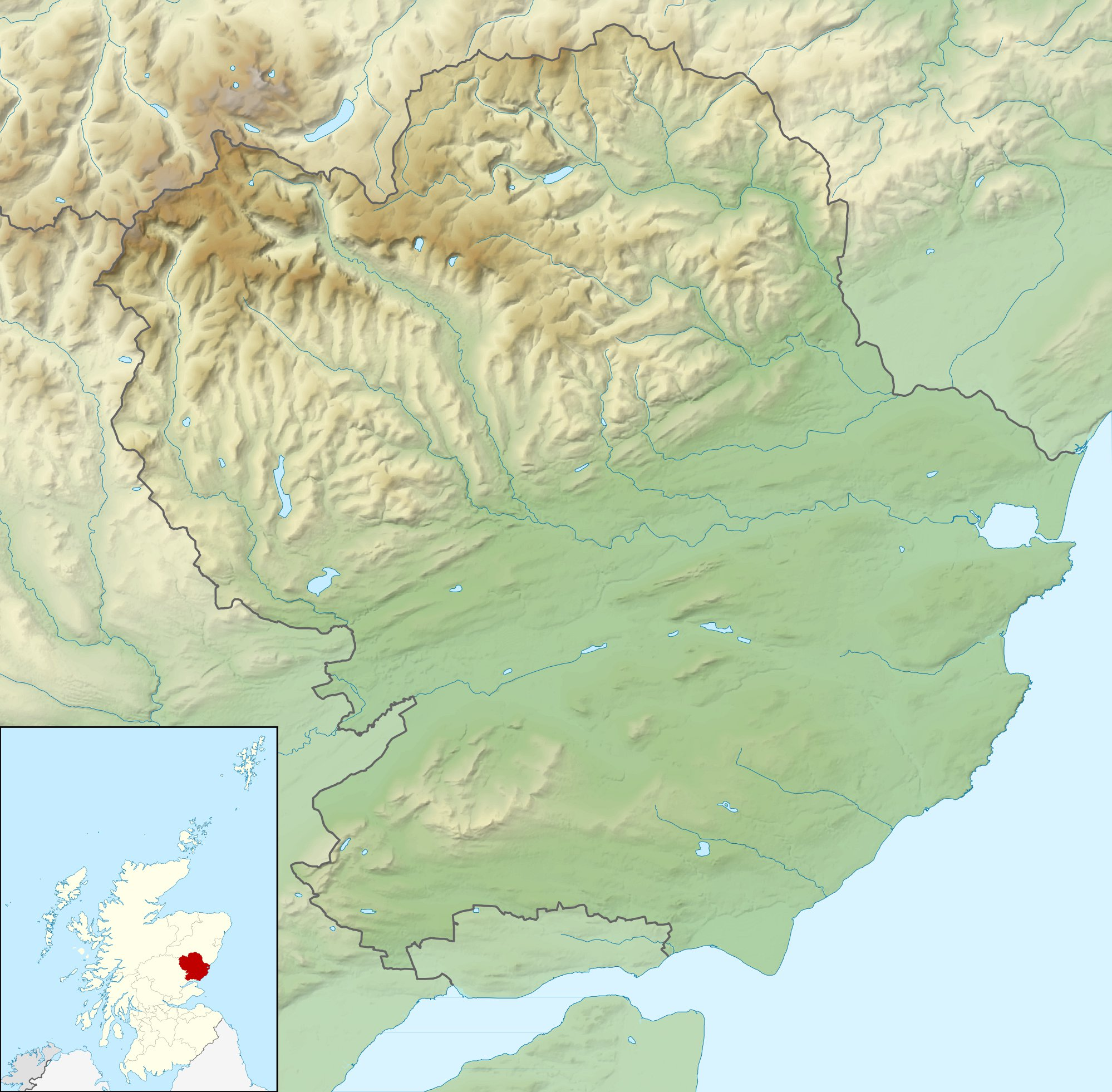
- Location in the United Kingdom Location in Scotland Location in Angus, Scotland

The 2010 Senior Open Championship was a senior major golf championship and the 24th Senior Open Championship, held from 22–25 July at Carnoustie Golf Links in Carnoustie, Scotland. It was the first Senior Open Championship played at the course and the eighth Senior Open Championship played as a senior major championship.

World Golf Hall of Fame member Bernhard Langer won by one stroke over 1995 U.S. Open champion Corey Pavin. The 2010 event was Langer's first senior major championship victory.

== Venue ==
The 2010 event was the first Senior Open Championship played at Carnoustie. The course would host the Senior Open Championship for a second time six years later, in 2016.

=== Course layout ===
Hole	Name	Yards	Par	Hole	Name	Yards	Par
1	Cup	400	4	10	South America	465	4
2	Gulley	459	4	11	John Philp	380	4
3	Jockie's Burn	355	4	12	Southward Ho	479	4
4	Hillocks	412	4	13	Whins	161	3
5	Brae	408	4	14	Spectacles	510	5
6	Hogan's Alley	565	5	15	Lucky Slap	471	4
7	Plantation	409	4	16	Barry Burn	232	3
8	Short	181	3	17	Island	459	4
9	Railway	464	4	18	Home	487	4
Out		3,653	36	In		3,644	35
				Total		7,297	71

== Field ==
The field of 144 competitors included 136 professionals and 8 amateurs. An 18-hole stroke play qualifying round was held on Monday, 19 July for players who were not already exempt.

=== Past champions in the field ===
==== Made the cut ====
Player	Country	Year(s) won	R1	R2	R3	R4	Total	To par	Finish
Loren Roberts	United States	2006, 2009	71	72	75	69	287	+3	T14
Bruce Vaughan	United States	2008	68	76	74	71	289	+5	T20
Tom Watson	United States	2003, 2005, 2007	74	71	71	74	290	+6	T24

==== Missed the cut ====
Player	Country	Year(s) won	R1	R2	Total	To par
Pete Oakley	United States	2004	76	77	153	+11
Bob Charles	New Zealand	1989, 1993	80	78	158	+16
Christy O'Connor, Jr.	Ireland	1999, 2000	80	-	80	WD

=== Past winners and runners-up at The Open Championship in the field ===
The field included five former winners of The Open Championship. Three of them made the cut; 1996 Open champion Tom Lehman (tied 11th),1989 Open champion Mark Calcavecchia (tied 14th), 1975, 1977, 1980, 1982 and 1983 Open champion Tom Watson (tied 24th).1985 Open champion Sandy Lyle and 1963 Open champion Bob Charles did not make the cut.

The field also included six former runners-up at The Open Championship; Bernhard Langer (won), John Cook (tied 11th), Gordon J. Brand (tied 50th), Wayne Grady (tied 50th), Costantino Rocca (missed cut) and Mike Harwood (missed cut).

== Round summaries ==
=== First round ===
Thursday, 22 July 2010

Bernhard Langer, Jay Don Blake, and Carl Mason posted four-under-par 67s on day one to share the lead by one stroke.

Place	Player	Score	To par
T1	(Germany) Bernhard Langer	67	−4
T1	(United States) Jay Don Blake	67	−4
T1	(England) Carl Mason	67	−4
T4	(United States) Dan Forsman	68	−3
T4	(United States) Bruce Vaughan	68	−3
T4	(United States) Mark Wiebe	68	−3
T7	(United States) John Cook	69	−2
T7	(United States) Mike Donald	69	−2
T7	(United States) Larry Mize	69	−2
T7	(United States) Corey Pavin	69	−2
T7	(United States) Jeff Sluman	69	−2
T7	(Scotland) Sam Torrance	69	−2

=== Second round ===
Friday 23 July 2010

Corey Pavin shot a second consecutive 69 (−2) to tie Bernhard Langer for the lead. Langer shot an even-par 71.

Place	Player	Score	To par
T1	(Germany) Bernhard Langer	67-71=138	−4
T1	(United States) Corey Pavin	69-69=138	−4
T3	(United States) Dan Forsman	68-71=139	−3
T3	(United States) Jay Haas	70-69=139	−3
T3	(United States) Larry Mize	69-70=139	−3
T3	(Wales) Ian Woosnam	72-67=139	−3
7	(United States) Mark Calcavecchia	70-70=140	−2
T8	(United States) Jay Don Blake	67-74=141	−1
T8	(England) Russ Cochran	70-71=141	−1
T8	(United States) John Cook	69-72=141	−1

Amateurs: Haag (+6), Simson (+8), Stubbs (+10), Vallis (+15), Gilchrist (+16), Mercier (+17), Lockwood (+25), Rogers (+25)

=== Third round ===
Saturday, 24 July 2010

Langer shot a third round 69 (−2) to take a three stroke lead into the final round. Corey Pavin shot a one-over-par 72, which included two birdies and three bogies. Nine players finished the third round within five strokes of Langer's lead.

Place	Player	Score	To par
1	(Germany) Bernhard Langer	67-71-69=207	−6
2	(United States) Corey Pavin	69-69-72=210	−3
T3	(United States) Jay Don Blake	67-74-70=211	−2
T3	(United States) Russ Cochran	70-71-70=211	−2
T3	(United States) Fred Funk	75-69-67=211	−2
T3	(United States) Jay Haas	70-69-72=211	−2
T3	(United States) Larry Mize	69-70-72=211	−2
T3	(Wales) Ian Woosnam	72-67-72=211	−2
T9	(United States) Gary Hallberg	70-74-68=212	−1
T9	(England) Carl Mason	67-76-69=212	−1

Amateurs: Haag (+8)

=== Final round ===
Sunday, 25 July 2010

After a birdie on the par-4 2nd hole, Corey Pavin cut Bernhard Langer's lead to two strokes with 16 holes to play. Langer birdied the par-4 5th hole to regain a three shot lead, and extended his lead to four strokes after a bogey by Pavin. After bogies on the 8th and 9th holes, Russ Cochran and Pavin were within two strokes of Langer's lead, and Pavin cut the lead to one after birdieing the 11th. After a late bogey by Pavin, Langer carried a two stroke lead into the 72nd hole. After Pavin made par on the 18th hole, Langer secured bogey to win his first senior major championship by one stroke.

Place	Player	Score	To par	Money (€)
1	(Germany) Bernhard Langer	67-71-69-72=279	−5	242,639
2	(United States) Corey Pavin	69-69-72-70=280	−4	161,836
T3	(United States) Jay Don Blake	67-74-70-72=283	−1	69,140
T3	(United States) Russ Cochran	70-71-70-72=283	−1	69,140
T3	(United States) Fred Funk	75-69-67-72=283	−1	69,140
T3	(Australia) Peter Senior	71-72-72-68=283	−1	69,140
7	(Namibia) Trevor Dodds	74-71-69-70=284	E	43,669
T8	(United States) Tommy Armour III	74-72-69-70=285	+1	32,690
T8	(United States) Jay Haas	70-69-72-74=285	+1	32,690
T8	(Wales) Ian Woosnam	72-67-72-74=285	+1	32,690

Amateurs: Haag (+11)

==== Scorecard ====
Hole	1	2	3	4	5	6	7	8	9	10	11	12	13	14	15	16	17	18
Par	4	4	4	4	4	5	4	3	4	4	4	4	3	5	4	3	4	4
(Germany) Langer	−6	−6	−6	−6	−7	−7	−7	−6	−5	−5	−5	−5	−5	−6	−6	−6	−6	−5
(United States) Pavin	−3	−4	−4	−4	−4	−4	−3	−3	−3	−3	−4	−4	−4	−5	−4	−4	−4	−4
(United States) Blake	−2	−3	−2	−2	−1	−1	−1	−1	−1	−1	−2	−2	−1	−2	−1	−1	−1	−2
(United States) Cochran	−2	−3	−3	−3	−3	−3	−3	−3	−3	−2	−2	−2	−1	−2	−1	E	E	−1
(United States) Funk	−2	−2	−3	−3	−3	−3	−2	−2	−1	−2	−2	−1	−1	−1	−1	−1	−1	−1
(Australia) Senior	+1	E	E	−1	−1	−1	−1	−1	−1	E	E	E	E	E	E	E	−1	−1
(Namibia) Dodds	+1	+1	+1	+1	+1	+2	+2	+2	+2	+1	+1	+1	E	−1	−1	E	E	E

Cumulative tournament scores, relative to par

Birdie	Bogey

Preceded by 2010 Senior PGA Championship	Senior Major Championships	Succeeded by 2010 U.S. Senior Open
