= 2016 Senior Open Championship =

Tournament information
- Dates: 21–24 July 2016
- Location: Angus, Scotland; 56.497°N 2.717°W
- Courses: Carnoustie Golf Links; Championship Course
- Organised by: The R&A
- Tours: European Senior Tour; PGA Tour Champions
- Format: 72 holes stroke play

Statistics
- Par: 72
- Length: 7,346 yards (6,717 m)
- Field: 144 players, 71 after cut
- Cut: 148 (+4)
- Prize fund: US$1,681,607
- Winner's share: US$279,144

Champion
- (England) Paul Broadhurst
- 277 (−11)

Location map
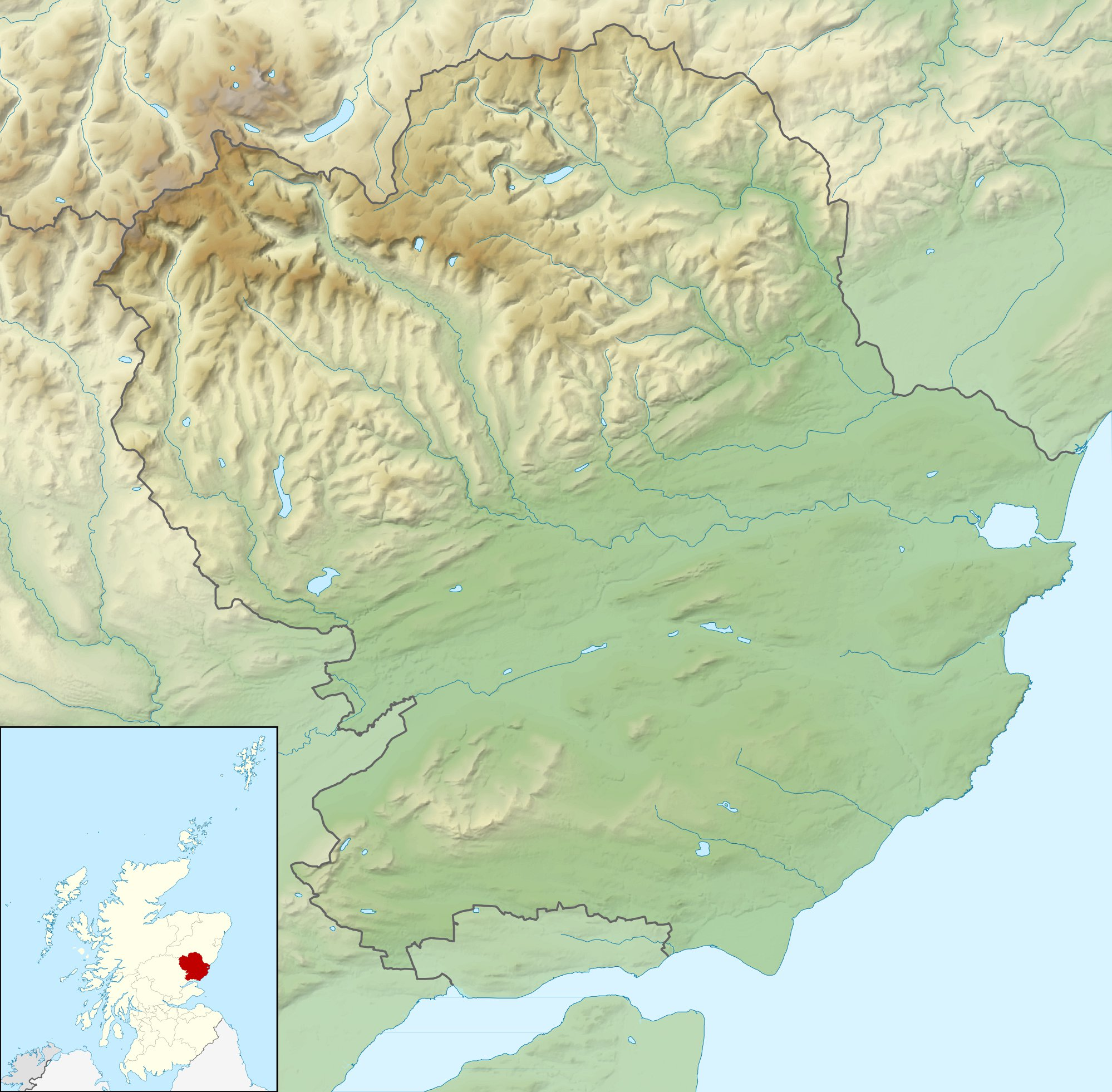
- Location in the United Kingdom Location in Scotland Location in Angus, Scotland

The 2016 Senior Open Championship was a senior major golf championship and the 30th Senior Open Championship, held on 21–24 July at Carnoustie Golf Links in Angus, Scotland. It was the second Senior Open Championship played at the course and the 14th Senior Open Championship played as a senior major championship.

Paul Broadhurst won by two strokes over Scott McCarron. It was Broadhurst's first senior major championship victory.

== Venue ==
The 2016 event was the second Senior Open Championship played at the Carnoustie Golf Links. The previous event was in 2010, with Bernhard Langer winning his first of four Senior Open Championships.

=== Championship Course ===
Hole	Name	Yards	Par	Hole	Name	Yards	Par
1	Cup	405	4	10	South America	464	4
2	Gulley	460	4	11	John Philip	379	4
3	Jockey's Burn	353	4	12	Southward Ho	502	5
4	Hillocks	409	4	13	Whins	172	3
5	Brae	412	4	14	Spectacles	509	5
6	Hogan's Alley	577	5	15	Lucky Slap	458	4
7	Plantation	407	4	16	Barry Burn	247	3
8	Short	186	3	17	Island	449	4
9	Railway	474	4	18	Home	483	4
Out		3,683	36	In		3,663	36
				Total		7,346	72

== Field ==
The field consisted of 144 professional and amateur competitors.

An 18-hole stroke play qualifying round was held on Monday, 18 July, for players who were not already exempt. Players from the qualifying competition joined the exempt players for the championship.

71 players, all of them professionals and no amateurs, made the 36-hole cut.

=== Past champions in the field ===
Five past Senior Open champions participated. Four of them made the 36-hole cut; 2010 and 2014 champion Bernhard Langer (9th), 2003, 2005 and 2007 champion Tom Watson (tied 27th), 2015 champion Marco Dawson (tied 60th) and 2011 champion Russ Cochran (tied 66th). 2002 champion Noboru Sugai did not make the cut.

=== Past winners of The Open Championship in the field ===
The field included seven former winners of The Open Championship. Five of them made the cut; 1996 Open champion Tom Lehman (tied 14th), 1998 Open champion Mark O'Meara (tied 18th), 1975, 1977, 1980, 1982 and 1983 Open champion Tom Watson (tied 27th), 1995 Open champion John Daly (tied 54th) and 1989 Open champion Mark Calcavecchia (70th). 2004 Open champion Todd Hamilton and 1985 Open champion Sandy Lyle missed the cut.

== Final results ==
Sunday, 24 July 2016

Place	Player	Score	To par	Money ($)
1	(England) Paul Broadhurst	75-66-68-68=277	−11	279,144
2	(United States) Scott McCarron	69-70-71-69=279	−9	186,141
T3	(Spain) Miguel Ángel Jiménez	70-70-65-75=280	−8	94,261
T3	(Sweden) Magnus Persson Atlevi	70-69-74-67=280	−8	94,261
T5	(United States) Tom Byrum	69-69-71-72=281	−7	64,802
T5	(United States) Brandt Jobe	73-67-75-66=281	−7	64,802
T7	(United States) Joe Durant	69-68-72-73=282	−6	46,025
T7	(United States) Wes Short Jr.	70-70-69-73=282	−6	46,025
T9	(United States) Billy Andrade	71-72-68-73=284	−4	33,931
T9	(Australia) Peter Fowler	69-69-75-71=284	−4	33,931
T9	(Germany) Bernhard Langer	71-71-71-71=284	−4	33,931

Preceded by 2016 U.S. Senior PGA Championship	Senior Major Championships	Succeeded by 2016 U.S. Senior Open
