= Carnoustie Golf Links =

Golf course in Angus, Scotland

Coordinates: 56.497°N 2.717°W

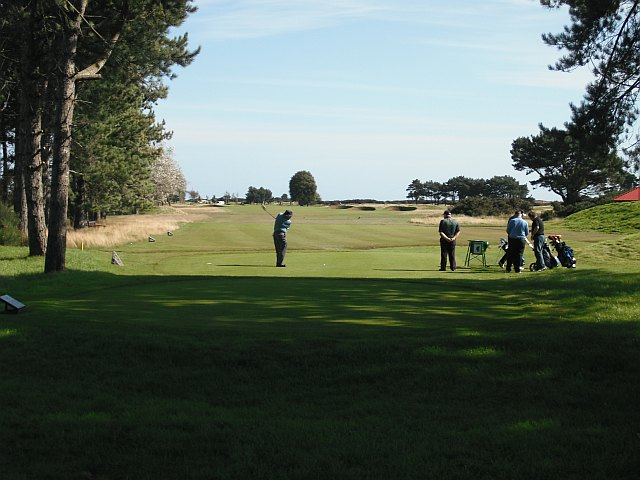

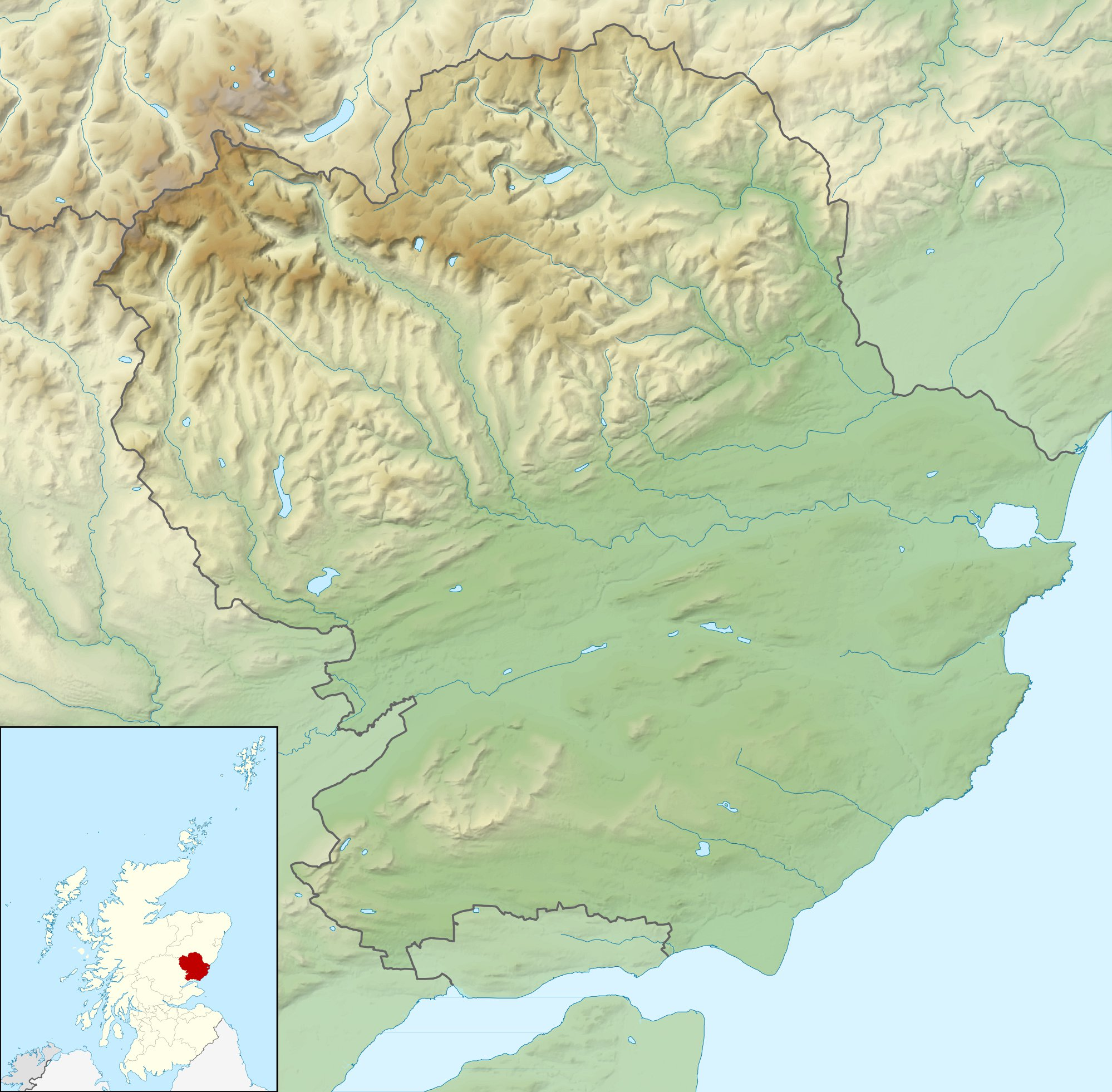
- Location in Scotland Location in Angus, Scotland

Club information
- Location: Carnoustie, Scotland
- Established: 1842; 184 years ago
- Type: Public
- Total holes: 54
- Website: carnoustiegolflinks

Championship
- Designed by: Allan Robertson and Old Tom Morris; James Braid (1926)
- Par: 72 (71 for The Open)
- Length: 6,941 yards (6,347 m) (7,402 yards (6,768 m) for the 2018 Open)
- Course record: 63 by Tommy Fleetwood (6 Oct 2017)

Burnside
- Designed by: James Braid
- Par: 68
- Length: 5,963 yards (5,453 m)

Buddon Links
- Designed by: Peter Alliss and Dave Thomas
- Par: 68
- Length: 5,921 yards (5,414 m)

Carnoustie Golf Links is in Carnoustie, Angus, Scotland. Carnoustie has four courses – the historic Championship Course, the Burnside Course, the Buddon Links Course and a free-to-play short, five-hole course called The Nestie. Carnoustie Golf Links is one of the venues in the Open Championship rotation and has hosted golf's oldest major on eight occasions (1931, 1937, 1953, 1968, 1975, 1999, 2007, 2018), as well as the Senior Open Championship in 2010 and 2016 and the Women's British Open in 2011 and 2021. The course will host the Open for a ninth time in 2029.

== History ==
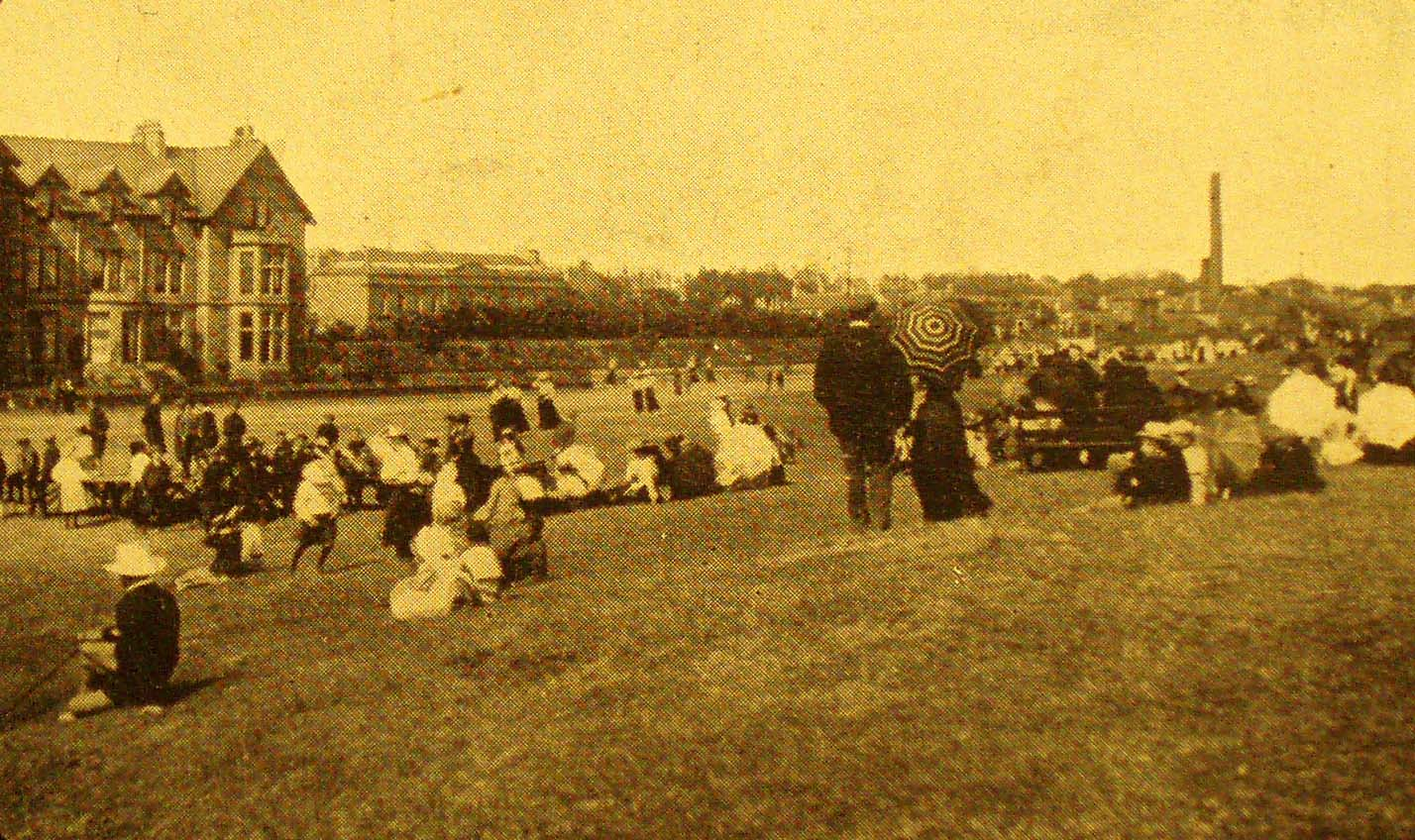
View of Carnoustie Links in the 1910s

Golf is recorded as having been played at Carnoustie in the early 16th century. In 1890, the 14th Earl of Dalhousie, who owned the land, sold the links to the local authority. It had no funds to acquire the property, and public fundraising was undertaken and donated to the council. The original course was of ten holes, crossing and recrossing the Barry Burn; it was designed by Allan Robertson, assisted by Old Tom Morris, and opened in 1842. The opening of the coastal railway from Dundee to Arbroath in 1838 brought an influx of golfers from as far afield as Edinburgh, anxious to tackle the ancient links. This led to a complete restructuring of the course, extended in 1867 by Old Tom Morris to the 18 holes which had meanwhile become standardized. Young Tom Morris won a major open event there that same year. Two additional courses have since been added: the Burnside Course and the shorter though equally testing Buddon Links.

Carnoustie first played host to The Open Championship in 1931, after modifications to the course by James Braid in 1926. The winner then was Tommy Armour, from Edinburgh.

Later Open winners at Carnoustie include Henry Cotton of England in 1937, Ben Hogan of the USA in 1953, Gary Player of South Africa in 1968, Tom Watson of the USA in 1975, Paul Lawrie of Scotland in 1999, Pádraig Harrington of Ireland in 2007 and Francesco Molinari of Italy in 2018. The 1975, 1999 and 2007 editions were all won in playoffs.

The Championship course was modified significantly (but kept its routing used since 1926) prior to the 1999 Open, with all bunkers being rebuilt, many bunkers both added and eliminated, many green complexes expanded and enhanced, and several new tees being built. A large hotel was also built behind the 18th green of the Championship course.

The Amateur Championship was first hosted by Carnoustie in 1947; the winner was Willie Turnesa. The world's oldest amateur event has returned three times since: 1966 (won by Bobby Cole), 1971 (won by Steve Melnyk), and 1992 (won by Stephen Dundas).

The British Ladies Amateur was first hosted by Carnoustie in 1973, and also in 2012.

The Senior Open Championship was held at Carnoustie for the first time in 2010, with Germany's Bernhard Langer winning. The Women's British Open was held here for the first time in 2011; the winner was Yani Tseng.

Carnoustie is one of the three courses hosting the Alfred Dunhill Links Championship, an autumn event on the European Tour; the others are the Old Course at St Andrews and Kingsbarns.

The Golf Channel's reality series The Big Break, in which aspiring golfers compete for exemptions on professional tours and other prizes, filmed its fourth season at Carnoustie in 2005. As that year also saw the Ryder Cup at The K Club in Ireland, that year's show was based around a US v Europe theme, with the two teams competing for European Tour exemptions.

In North America, the course is nicknamed "Car-nasty," due to its infamous difficulty, especially under adverse weather conditions. Carnoustie is considered to be the most difficult course in the Open rota, and one of the toughest courses in the world.

The 1999 Open Championship is best remembered for the collapse of French golfer Jean van de Velde, who needed only a double-bogey six on the 72nd hole to win the Open—and proceeded to score a triple-bogey seven, tying Paul Lawrie and 1997 champion Justin Leonard at 290 (+6). Lawrie won the four-hole aggregate playoff and the championship.

The Open Championship was once again contested at Carnoustie in July 2007. The eight-year absence was far shorter than the lengthy 24 years it took to return to Carnoustie, between 1975 and 1999. Padraig Harrington triumphed over Sergio García in a four-hole playoff. The 18th hole once again proved itself among the most dramatic and exciting in championship golf. Harrington had a one-shot lead over García as he approached the final hole in the fourth round, but proceeded to put not one but two shots into the Barry Burn, on his way to a double-bogey 6. García, playing in the final pairing of the day, reached the 18th with a one-shot lead over Harrington, but bogeyed the hole after missing a putt from just under ten feet away, setting up the playoff. In the four-hole playoff, which ended on the 18th, Harrington took no chances with a two-shot lead on the 18th; his bogey was enough to defeat García by one shot.

The Open Championship returned to Carnoustie in 2018, where Francesco Molinari became the first Italian major winner, and Europe's third consecutive Open champion at Carnoustie. Molinari's final round was a bogey-free 69, which saw off challenges from several players including past champions Tiger Woods and Rory McIlroy.

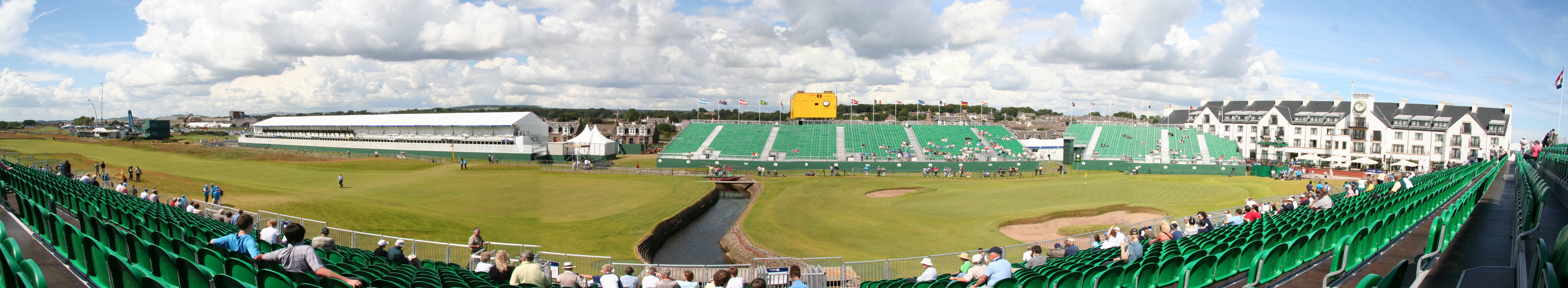
The 18th hole at Carnoustie and the Barry Burn.

On 17 January 2014, Carnoustie Golf Links appointed its first-ever female chairman, Pat Sawers.

Carnoustie Golf Links won the title of World's Best Golf Course 2019 at the World Golf Awards, Abu Dhabi.

Carnoustie Golf Links came under private ownership in March 2025 through a sale to Carnoustie Golf Heritage and Hospitality Group Limited (CGHH), a private investment group directed by Johann (Max) Herberstein and Paul Lisiak of Metropolitan Partners Group. The group had earlier acquired the Carnoustie Golf Hotel and Spa in September 2023. The acquisition was followed by substantial investment in local hospitality infrastructure, including upgrades to the hotel and surrounding facilities.

== The Open Championship ==
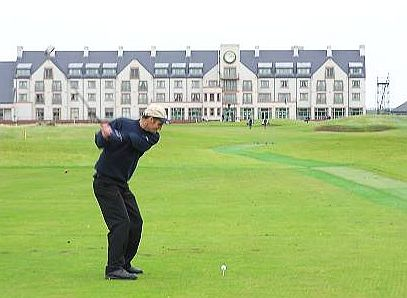
Carnoustie is known as 'Golf's Greatest Test'. It is one of the venues for The Open Championship.

This is a list of The Open Championship champions at Carnoustie Golf Links:

Year	Winner	Score					Winner's share (£)
Year	Winner	R1	R2	R3	R4	Total	Winner's share (£)
1931	(United States) Tommy Armour	73	75	77	71	296 (+8)	100
1937	(England) Henry Cotton ^{2nd}	74	72	73	71	290 (+6)	100
1953	(United States) Ben Hogan	73	71	70	68	282 (−6)	500
1968	(South Africa) Gary Player ^{2nd}	74	71	71	73	289 (+1)	3,000
1975	(United States) Tom Watson ^{1st}	71	67	69	72	279 (−9) ^{PO}	7,500
1999	(Scotland) Paul Lawrie	73	74	76	67	290 (+6) ^{PO}	350,000
2007	(Republic of Ireland) Pádraig Harrington ^{1st}	69	73	68	67	277 (−7) ^{PO}	750,000
2018	(Italy) Francesco Molinari	70	72	65	69	276 (−8)	1,625,387

- Note: For multiple winners of The Open Championship, superscript ordinal identifies which in their respective careers.

== The Women's British Open ==
Winners of the Women's British Open at Carnoustie Golf Links.

Year	Winner	Score				
Year	Winner	R1	R2	R3	R4	Total
2011	(Taiwan) Yani Tseng ^{2nd}	71	66	66	69	272 (−16)
2021	(Sweden) Anna Nordqvist	71	71	65	69	276 (−12)

== The Senior Open ==
Winner of The Senior Open Championship at Carnoustie Golf Links.

Year	Winner	Score				
Year	Winner	R1	R2	R3	R4	Total
2010	(Germany) Bernhard Langer	67	71	69	72	279 (−5)
2016	(England) Paul Broadhurst	75	66	68	68	277 (−11)
2024	(South Korea) K. J. Choi	69	69	70	70	278 (−10)

== Course ==
=== Championship Course ===
Tee	Rating/Slope	1	2	3	4	5	6	7	8	9	Out	10	11	12	13	14	15	16	17	18	In	Total
2018 Open 2024 Senior Open		396	461	350	415	412	580	410	187	474	3,685	465	382	503	175	513	472	248	460	499	3,717	7,402
Par	The Open The Senior Open	4 4	4 4	4 4	4 4	4 4	5 5	4 4	3 3	4 4	36 36	4 4	4 4	4 5	3 3	5 5	4 4	3 3	4 4	4 4	35 36	71 72
Championship		405	459	355	412	411	573	409	183	474	3,681	465	380	504	171	510	471	249	460	499	3,709	7,390
Par		4	4	4	4	4	5	4	3	4	36	4	4	4	3	5	4	3	4	4	35	71
White	M:75.2 / 139	401	435	345	375	387	520	394	167	416	3,440	446	362	479	161	476	459	245	433	444	3,505	6,945
Par		4	4	4	4	4	5	4	3	4	36	4	4	5	3	5	4	3	4	4	36	72
Yellow	M:73.6 / 135	389	407	325	364	369	500	373	157	416	3,300	417	351	407	141	459	437	235	421	421	3,289	6,589
Par		4	4	4	4	4	5	4	3	4	36	4	4	4	3	4	4	3	4	4	34	70
Green	M:71.5 / 130 L:77.3 / 140	364	382	310	358	350	485	350	133	402	3,134	332	330	395	121	440	418	212	374	383	3,005	6,139
Par	Men's Ladies'	4 4	4 4	4 4	4 4	4 4	5 5	4 4	3 3	4 5	36 37	4 4	4 4	4 4	3 3	4 5	4 5	3 4	4 4	4 4	34 37	70 74
Black	M:69.1 / 126 L:74.4 / 135	364	303	290	305	298	485	295	133	343	2,816	332	292	330	121	375	384	212	374	374	2,794	5,610
Par	Men's Ladies'	4 4	4 4	4 4	4 4	4 4	5 5	4 4	3 3	4 4	36 36	4 4	4 4	4 4	3 3	4 4	4 4	3 4	4 4	4 4	34 35	70 71

The name of each holes are below:

Hole	Name	Par	Hole	Name	Par
1	Cup	4	10	South America	4
2	Gulley	4	11	John Philip	4
3	Jockey's Burn	4	12	Southward Ho	4
4	Hillocks	4	13	Whins	3
5	Brae	4	14	Spectacles	5
6	Hogan's Alley	5	15	Lucky Slap	4
7	Plantation	4	16	Barry Burn	3
8	Short	3	17	Island	4
9	Railway	4	18	Home	4
Out		36	In		35
			Total		71

Lengths of the course for previous Opens (since 1930):

- 2018 : 7,402 yards (6,768 m) , par 71
- 2007 : 7,421 yards (6,786 m) , par 71
- 1999 : 7,361 yards (6,731 m) , par 71
- 1975 : 7,065 yards (6,460 m) , par 72
- 1968 : 7,252 yards (6,631 m) , par 72
- 1953 : 7,200 yards (6,600 m) , par 72
- 1937 : 7,200 yards (6,600 m) , par 72
- 1931 : 6,701 yards (6,127 m) , par 72

The 12th hole was played as a par-5 in 1975, and the 18th hole was played as a par-5 in previous Opens (1931−1968) .

Length of the course for Women's British Open

- 2021 : 6,840 yards (6,250 m), par 72
- 2011 : 6,490 yards (5,930 m), par 72

Length of the course for Senior Open Championship

- 2024 : 7,402 yards (6,768 m), par 72
- 2016 : 7,345 yards (6,716 m), par 72
- 2010 : 7,297 yards (6,672 m), par 71

In 2010, the 12th hole was played as a long par-4, but from 2016, it has been played as a short par-5.

=== Course record ===
Player	Country	Score	Tournament	Date
Tommy Fleetwood	England	63 (−9)	Alfred Dunhill Links Championship	6 Oct 2017

==== Scorecard ====
Hole	1	2	3	4	5	6	7	8	9	10	11	12	13	14	15	16	17	18
Par	4	4	4	4	4	5	4	3	4	4	4	5	3	5	4	3	4	4
(England) Fleetwood	E	−1	−1	−2	−2	−3	−3	−3	−3	−3	−4	−5	−6	−7	−8	−8	−8	−9

Birdie

- The course was par 72 at 7,394 yards (6,761 m), with the 12th hole as a par 5 at 504 yards (461 m).

=== Burnside Course ===
Hole	Name	Yards	Par	Hole	Name	Yards	Par
1	Peninsula	319	4	10	Kopje	330	4
2	Ravensby	456	4	11	Deil's Ha'	372	4
3	Fence	172	3	12	Heather	383	4
4	South America	457	4	13	Punchbowl	379	4
5	Burn	158	3	14	Scoup	228	3
6	Camp	335	4	15	Sou' Western	490	5
7	Shelter	362	4	16	Whins	171	3
8	Battery	424	4	17	Sinkies	461	4
9	Grog	163	3	18	Lismore	303	4
Out		2,846	33	In		3,117	35
				Total		5,963	68

=== Buddon Links Course ===
Hole	Name	Yards	Par	Hole	Name	Yards	Par
1	Alma	423	4	10	Somme	395	4
2	Corunna	171	3	11	The Hook	411	4
3	Wadi Akarit	364	4	12	St Valery	398	4
4	Ypres	164	3	13	Marne	170	3
5	Kohima	323	4	14	Waterloo	399	4
6	Vimy	401	4	15	Falaise	165	3
7	Mareth	193	3	16	Cassino	493	5
8	El Alamein	517	5	17	Tobruk	159	3
9	Caen	358	4	18	Rhine	417	4
Out		2,914	34	In		3,007	34
				Total		5,921	68

== See also ==
- Golf in Scotland
